= Elizabeth Stone =

Elizabeth Stone may refer to

- Anne-Elizabeth Stone (born 1990), American fencer
- Elizabeth Stone (19th-century writer) (1803–1881), English writer
- Elizabeth Stone (swimmer), American Paralympic swimmer
- Elizabeth Stone (photographer), American photographer
- Elizabeth Hickok Robbins Stone (1801–1895), American pioneer
- Elizabeth W. Stone (1918–2002), American librarian and educator
- Elizabeth Stone (educator), Australian and UK school head
