= West Maling =

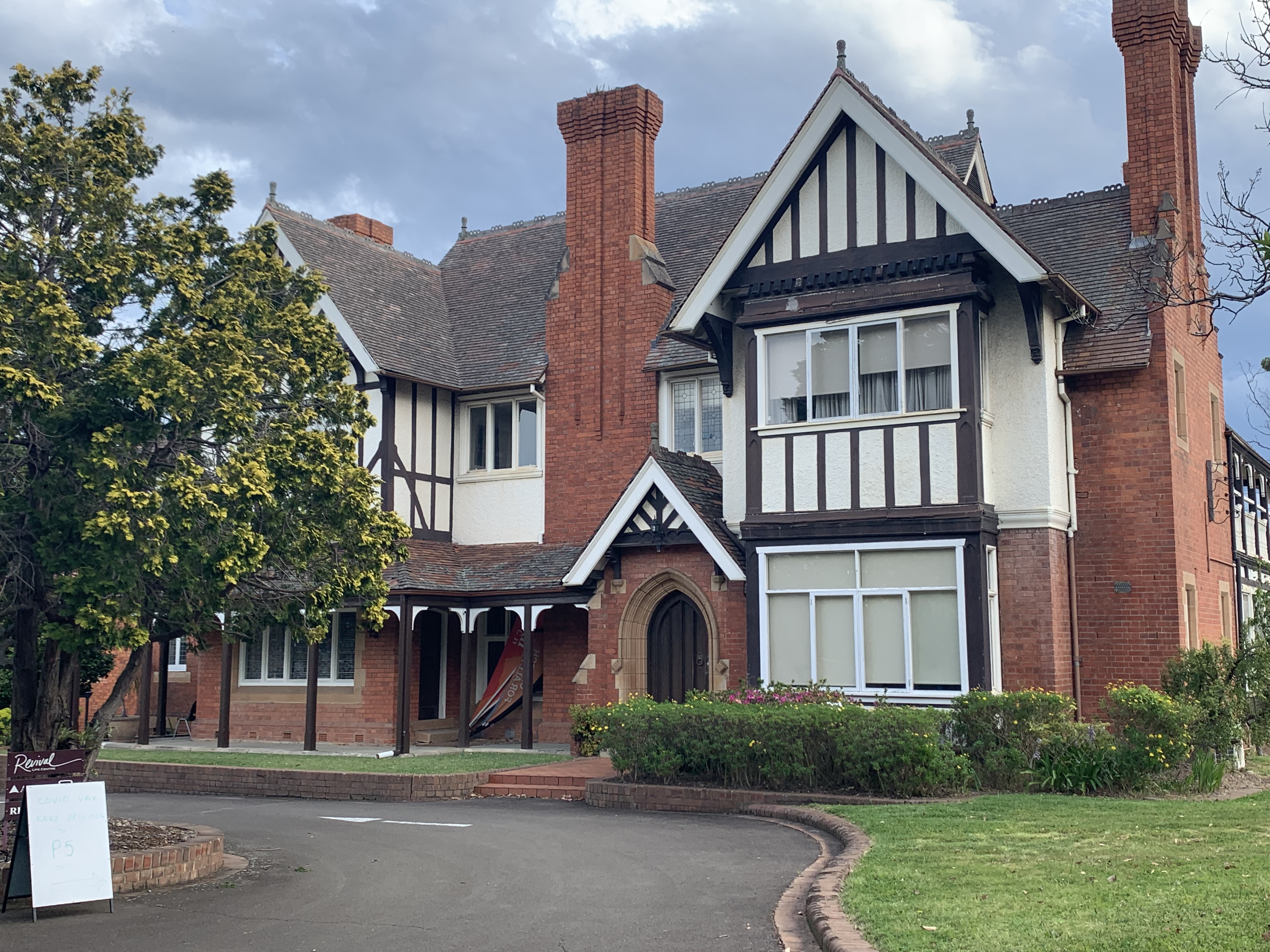
- West Mailing, pictured in October 2021.

- Location within Sydney Location within Australia
- 33°57′58″S 151°05′40″E
- Location: 663–665 King Georges Road, Penshurst, Georges River Council, New South Wales, Australia

History
- Built: 1889
- Built for: Albert Bythesea Weigall

Site notes
- Architect: Richard Norman Shaw (attributed)
- Architectural style: Federation Queen Anne
- Owner: Australian Evangelist Association

New South Wales Heritage Register
- Official name: West Maling (Revival Life Centre); Weigall House
- Type: State heritage (built)
- Designated: 2 April 1999
- Reference no.: 269
- Type: House
- Category: Residential buildings (private)
- Builders: Charles Halstead (supervising architect)

West Maling is a heritage-listed former residence and now ecclesiastical centre and administration building located at 663–665 King Georges Road, Penshurst, Georges River Council, New South Wales, Australia. Its design is attributed to Richard Norman Shaw who is likely to have influenced its design, and built by Charles Halstead the supervising architect. It is also known as West Maling (Revival Life Centre) and Weigall House. The property is owned by Australian Evangelist Association. It was added to the New South Wales State Heritage Register on 2 April 1999.

== History ==
=== Penshurst ===
Early botanist Dr Robert Townson (1763–1827) received one of the first land grants in this area. The 650 hectares (1,605 acres) he was granted in 1808, were west of the present King George's Road, extending to today's Boundary Road. In 1809 he received another 165 hectares (408 acres) north of his original grant. His property passed to John Connell in 1830, whose name was taken for a subdivision of the land in 1869. J. C. and E. P. Laycock acquired the land and carried out the subdivision, which they called 'Connell's Bush', the western part of which was bought by Thomas Sutcliffe Mort (who had large land holdings in the district before 1861 and bought the south-western section of Townson's 1808 grant). Located on the Illawarra railway line between Hurstville and Mortdale.

The early work in this area was timber-cutting and small farming. The railway came through in 1886 and opened up the suburb as a residential area: the platform was established in 1890. A former Governor-General of Australia, Lord de L'Isle, whose family seat in England is Penshurst Place, visited the suburb in 1961 during his term of office (1961–65). Penshurst in Kent has the same misty quality that Penshurst, Sydney had in earlier times, when southerly winds blew a sea mist across from Oatley Bay on the Georges River. Today the larger number of buildings in the area make this quality less evident.

=== West Maling ===
West Maling on King Georges Road (formerly Belmore Road) was built in 1889 for Albert Bythesea Weigall, a former Headmaster of Sydney Grammar School and was originally named Weigall House. Weigall lived there until 1912.

Weigall was born in Nantes, France in 1840 and later became possibly the most famous headmaster of Sydney Grammar School, a position he enjoyed and held with notable success from 1866–1912. He built West Mailing as his home on top of a hill in Penshurst where it still has a commanding view over Botany Bay.

This grand mansion in the Elizabethan Tudor style is thought to be a rare example of the work of the English architect, Richard Norman Shaw. Its construction was supervised by local architect, Charles Halstead, the final cost being A£3,561, 10 shillings and tuppence.

It is noted for its Federation Queen Anne style of its architecture and the quality of its detail. It is a rare example of that period from the mid-1860s onwards which was popularised by the English architects, William Eden Nesfield and Richard Norman Shaw and their followers. It appears to be the earliest Queen Anne design to appear in Sydney.

The original garden was set out during the Federation period and from the beautiful wrought iron carriage gates set between pillars a privet hedge extended along Penshurst Avenue. Some of this had to be removed in 1983 to allow builders access to build the underground chapel and avoid damaging these gates.

The Weigall family enjoyed an elegant lifestyle. A broad front garden once separated the house from King Georges Road, until part was resumed by Kogarah Council for road widening in December 1970.

The history of ownership is uncertain between 1912 and 1960.

The property had been lived in by a succession of families until 1953.

On 27 August 1953 the property was bought by the Oblate Fathers, a Roman Catholic Order of Priests devoted to religious education and counselling. From here they conducted what was virtually a Theological Correspondence School which, pre-computers, required the installation of a printing press. Their lifestyle was spartan. Each father slept on a stretcher bed alongside his massive oak desk where he worked during the day but in spite of their frugal lifestyle, high maintenance costs and rising rates forced the Oblate Fathers to relocate.

On 17 May 1972 the property was sold to Norman Lloyd Armstrong of Sylvania, Gordon Barnard Gibbs of Wentworthville, both Ministers of Religion, and Mrs Ruth Margaret Harvey of Caringbah, as Trustees for the Revival Life Assembly. This is an Assemblies of God Church, a non-denominational religious group worshipping in an evangelistic charismatic way. The ballroom in became a chapel but as church membership grew there was a need to increase in size the meeting area.

In 1981 Kogarah Council sought advice from the Heritage Council in relation to the proposed erection of a new chapel in the front garden of the property. Whilst the existing building was not to be physically affected by the proposed chapel, Kogarah Council considered that the design and location of it could significantly detract from the appearance of the building. At that time West Maling was the administrative and ecclesiastical centre of the Australian Evangelistic Association and is known as its Revival Life Centre.

The Heritage Council considered the matter and an Interim Heritage Order was placed over the property on 31 July 1981. Following liaison and consultation between the Australian Evangelistic Association and the Heritage Council and employment of an architect, a satisfactory chapel was designed and built.

In 1983 architects Noel Bell and Rose-Marie Willett of Noel Bell Ridley Smith & Partners were given a brief to design a chapel which would accommodate 350 people and at the same time preserve the house and protect the century-old trees that surrounded it. This was accomplished by building the chapel underground beneath a car park at the front of the building. Constructed of concrete and coloured deep brown to blend with the warm toned brickwork of West Maling, the new chapel has galleries which bring its capacity up to 400 people.

The project also sought to provide minister's offices, book and tape library and a mothers' room for infants. The problem of providing the required accommodation plus parking on the site for 31 cars and a one-way road system, seemed at first insoluble, as the garden formed an important part of the property's character. A separate low-key building with minimal impact on existing structures and landscape features was chosen. The natural fall of the land to the south and presence of a former tennis court at a lower level to the house suggested a design in which the bulk of the new building could be cut into the hillside so the roof of the building could act as a natural extension to the main garden front without visually obstructing West Maling. This roof was then designed to act as a car parking area with access to the original circular drive and entry gates. In general terms the existing landscaping was substantially retained and supplemented with new trees to restore the enclosure of West Maling along the Penshurst Avenue frontage.

In recognition of its historic and architectural significance a Permanent Conservation Order was placed over the property on 2 December 1983.

The new chapel was sited to allow for preservation of as many mature trees as possible. The roof serves as a car park, backed by a row of brush box (Lophostemon confertus), so does not detract from the stately old house. The colour of the new building matches the old in its rendered finish and the descending entry steps are partly concealed by a pergola festooned with potato vine (Solanum jasminoides). One of the trees removed for construction was a large jacaranda. A semi-mature golden false-cypress (Chamaecyparis lawsoniana 'Crippsii') in a circular bed opposite the front door also added to the gold and green theme. In consultation with the architects and clients Mary Davis designed the gardens which were to enhance the new building while relating to the Tudor (Revival) style residence and the clients' requirements relating to ongoing maintenance. A yellow, white and blue colour scheme was used, Kentia palms (Kentia spp.) in shady areas and blue and white Cape leadwort (Plumbago capensis) used extensively. The privet hedge was removed and replaced with plumbago. New trees include jacaranda, golden honey locust (Gleditsia triacanthos 'Sunburst') and evergreen magnolia (M.grandiflora). Low maintenance shrubs included Abelia x grandiflora and A.g.'Variegata', sweet box (Murraya paniculata), St.John's wort (Hypericum patulum), bird-of-paradise flowers (Strelitzia spp.) (already existing on site) and golden breath-of-heaven (Diosma). Below the brush box trees shrubs and ground covers of heavenly bamboo (Nandina domestica), box (Buxus microphylla), some existing tree ferns (Cyathea sp.), kaffir lilies (Clivia miniata), peacock iris (Dietes grandiflora), cast-iron plants (Aspidistra elatior), variegated spider plants (Chlorophytum comosum 'Variegatum') and periwinkle (Vinca major) have been planted in drifts.

In 1984 through the Heritage Assistance Program a dollar for dollar grant of $6,000 was provided to the Revival Life Centre Church to assist in the repainting of West Maling.

Today West Maling is a religious centre and, because of the purpose for which it was used over many years, it has survived undamaged and in excellent condition.

West Maling was transferred to the NSW State Heritage Register on 2 April 1999.

== Description ==
Grounds and garden

A broad front garden once separated the house from King Georges Road, until part of the frontage was resumed by Kogarah Council for road widening in 1970. Wrought iron gates between rendered pillars open onto an entry drive with bull nosed brick edging.

To the front and sides of the house, the original garden and driveways remain. Mature pines, Prunus sp., palms and an avenue of brush box (Lophostemon confertus) are the predominant planting.

The fine mature trees in the north-east corner of the site (i.e.: corner of King Georges Road and Penshurst Avenue) (black bean (Castanospermum australe), Himalayan cedar (Cedrus deodara), Moreton Bay fig (Ficus macrophylla), silky oak (Grevillea robusta), seven existing camphor laurels (Cinnamommum camphora), Norfolk Island pine (Araucaria heterophylla) and the mature Himalayan cedar and Norfolk Island pine immediately to the north-west of the new chapel (1982) are unaffected by the new work and are retained.

A 1/1983 landscape plan (Mary Davis Landscape Consultant) notes existing trees (all of the above ones plus) including on the north-east boundary (King Georges Road side) 2 existing Ochna serrulata, further south (adjoining the new chapel) existing palm seedlings, Cotoneaster pannosa, aged juniper (recommended to be replaced later with a black bean), existing oleander (near steps off King Georges Road to access the new chapel).

This plan notes on the south of the side lawn east of the house (near the new chapel) an existing juniper (Juniperus sp.), and another Himalayan cedar (closer to the house). On the southern boundary (by the new chapel) it notes 4 existing African olives (Olea europaea var. Africana), 1 heavenly bamboo (Nandina domestica), 2 existing tree ferns (Dicksonia antarctica), Philodendron selloum, and further west, a fruit salad plant (Monstera deliciosa).

In the south-western corner (car parking area) it notes 5 existing brush box (Lophostemon confertus), a red hibiscus, existing golden cypress (Cupressus brunniana 'Aurea'), climbing roses and picking garden running along the western boundary to the north. In the north-western corner still on the western boundary it notes existing red and white oleanders (Nerium oleander cv.s), and an existing Browallia sp. On the northern (Penshurst Road) boundary it notes an existing privet hedge (recommended for replacement with one of Plumbago auriculata). Flanking the original driveway entrance on this boundary it notes an existing Port wine magnolia (Michelia figo) on the west, and a Bougainvillea trailli on the eastern side. In the circular bed in the carriage loop is an existing golden dwarf cypress (Chamaecyparis lawsoniana cv., possibly C.l.'Crippsii'.

Lawns (presumably original are on the north of the house and to the east of the drive in the north-eastern corner.

Around the house, the Davis plan notes on the northern facade, a bed containing existing (and recommended new) roses, a "Cecile Brunner" rose existing on a pergola at the north-eastern corner of the house, a perennial picking garden featuring Shasta daisies, perennial phlox, gold and white tall bearded Iris, Canterbury bells etc. To the south-eastern corner of the house is an existing picking garden beside an area of lawn, 2 existing camellias, existing stone paved area with a well in it. South of the house is another paved area, with an existing African olive, pruned to shrub size. Azaleas must have existed then in the front perennial garden, as these were recommended for transplanting behind (west of) the house in expanded garden beds in front of blank walls and plumbing on wall surfaces).

The new chapel was sited to allow for preservation of as many mature trees as possible. The roof serves as a car park, backed by a row of brush box (Lophostemon confertus), so does not detract from the stately old house. The colour of the new building matches the old in its rendered finish and the descending entry steps are partly concealed by a pergola festooned with potato vine (Solanum jasminoides). One of the trees removed for construction was a large jacaranda. A semi-mature golden false-cypress (Chamaecyparis lawsoniana 'Crippsii') in a circular bed opposite the front door also added to the gold and green theme. In consultation with the architects and clients Mary Davis designed the gardens which were to enhance the new building while relating to the Tudor (Revival) style residence and the clients' requirements relating to ongoing maintenance. A yellow, white and blue colour scheme was used, Kentia palms (Kentia spp.) in shady areas and blue and white Cape leadwort (Plumbago capensis) used extensively. The privet hedge was removed and replaced with plumbago. New trees include jacaranda, golden honey locust (Gleditsia triacanthos 'Sunburst') and evergreen magnolia (M.grandiflora). Low maintenance shrubs included Abelia x grandiflora and A.g.'Variegata', sweet box (Murraya paniculata), St.John's wort (Hypericum patulum), bird-of-paradise flowers (Strelitzia spp.) (already existing on site) and golden breath-of-heaven (Diosma). Below the brush box trees shrubs and ground covers of heavenly bamboo (Nandina domestica), box (Buxus microphylla), some existing tree ferns (Cyathea sp.), kaffir lilies (Clivia miniata), peacock iris (Dietes grandiflora), cast-iron plants (Aspidistra elatior), variegated spider plants (Chlorophytum comosum 'Variegatum') and periwinkle (Vinca major) have been planted in drifts.

House: West Maling is one of the purest examples of the Queen Anne style evidenced. It is therefore likely to be a copy of an English residence. The work of British Architect Norman Shaw is likely to have influenced its design.

Constructed in a warm brick in English bond, it is a particularly attractive two storey residence featuring steeply pitched slate roofs, ornate brick chimneys, stained glass windows and Tudor influenced battening. The gable ends are of timber and stucco.

The verandah features timber posts with ornamental brackets and the chimneys rising high above the high gabled roof are a dominant feature. Admission to the house is through a massive cedar panelled front door set into a sandstone arch with Gothic flutings.

The entry porch is decorated with mosaic artistry. Interior doors are between three and four inches thick and have arched heads set into inverted arch architraves which are said to appear more Medieval than Elizabethan.

A pair of stained-glass Inglenook windows date the building to AD 1889.

The ballroom retains the original set of six stained-glass windows depicting English poets and essayists: Geoffrey Chaucer, William Shakspeare (sic), John Milton, John Bunyan, Edmund Spicer and Francis Bacon. Facing these windows is a low dais on which musicians once performed. This room in later years became a chapel. The joinery includes carved cedar mantelpieces, the one in the dining room having a carved panel bearing a crest and the motto "Semper Fidelis" (always faithful), and some rooms have pressed metal ceilings.

Internally and externally virtually all the original joinery remains. Of particular interest is the pointed arch shape to the top of the doors and the fireplaces and inglenook in the living room.

Chapel (1983): Underground structure with roof top car parking. Concrete construction coloured deep brown to tone in with house. Galleries bring its seating capacity to 400.

=== Condition ===
As at 8 February 2006, the setting modified significantly by 1982 underground chapel and above-roof parking, and additional car parking to the south-west (rear) of the house/property. Several trees removed.

Internally and externally virtually all the original joinery remains as do the original driveways and gardens.

=== Modifications and dates ===
1982 - approval to construct a 350 seat chapel below ground at the side (south-east) of the building near to King Georges Road, with off street parking above it on the rooftop. Removal of trees: a young jacaranda, a number of conifers bordering the old access lane near the S-E boundary, a spruce within the old tennis court area and 2 brush box trees to enlarge the driveway area and provide additional parking at the rear of the house.

== Heritage listing ==
As at 15 March 2006, West Maling has a high level of aesthetic significance at a state level as one of the purest examples of the Queen Anne style of architecture existing today and it is thought to be the first of its type of residence built in Australia. Its significance is enhanced by its retention internally and externally of virtually all the original joinery, its original driveways and part of its original gardens.

It has historical associations with Albert Bythesea Weigall, the first headmaster of Sydney Grammar School, having been built in 1889 for his residence.

The site has acquired social significance at a local level for its continued use by the Revival Life Centre as a church since the 1980s and prior to this time its use as a monastery.

West Maling was listed on the New South Wales State Heritage Register on 2 April 1999 having satisfied the following criteria.

The place is important in demonstrating the course, or pattern, of cultural or natural history in New South Wales.

It was built in 1889 for Albert Bythesea Weigall, the first headmaster of Sydney Grammar School.

The place is important in demonstrating aesthetic characteristics and/or a high degree of creative or technical achievement in New South Wales.

West Maling is one of the purest examples of the Queen Anne style of architecture existing today and is thought to be the first of its type of residence built in Australia.

== See also ==
- Australian residential architectural styles
