= John Vallance =

John Vallance may refer to:

- John Vallance (cricketer) (fl. 1790s), English cricketer
- John Vallance (politician) (1883–1963), Canadian politician
- John Taber Vallance (born 1958), Australian classical scholar and school and library administrator
- John Vallance (fl. early 19th century), American cartographer; colleague of Henry Schenck Tanner
