= Farideh Ghotbi =

Iranian public figure (1920–2000)

- فریده قطبی
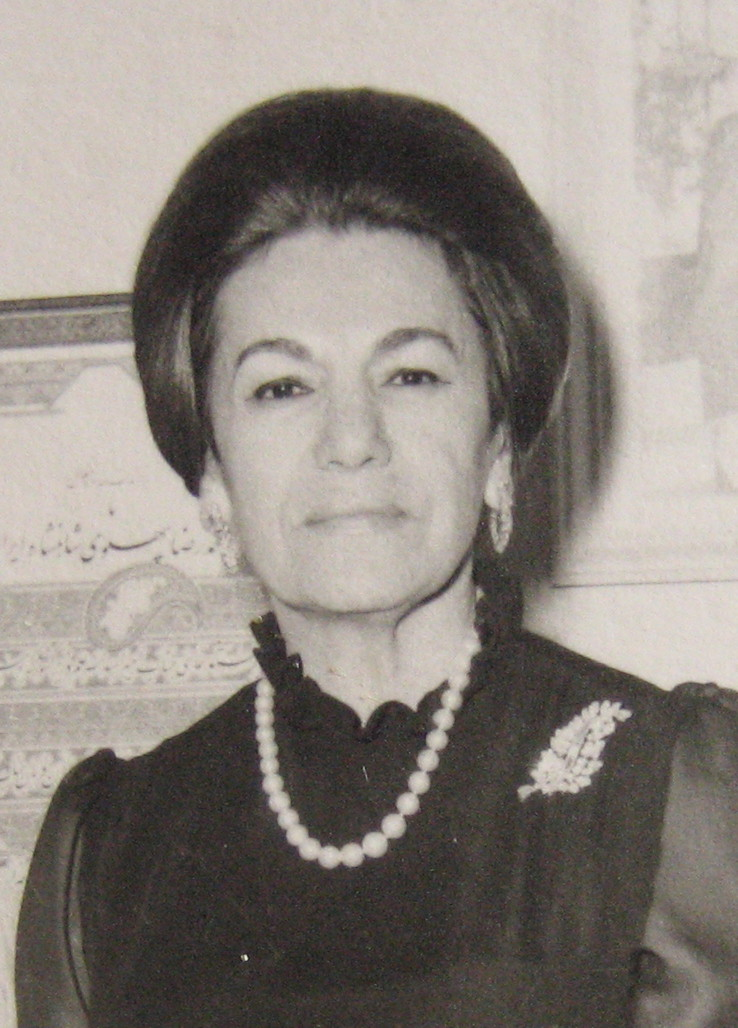
- Farideh Ghotbi in the 1970s
- Born: Tadji Ghotbi; 1 February 1920; Lahijan, Gilan province, Sublime State of Iran
- Died: 29 November 2000 (aged 80); Paris, France
- Burial place: Passy Cemetery
- Other names: Farideh Diba, Farideh Qotbi
- Spouse: Sohrab Diba (m. 1937; died 1948)
- Children: Empress Farah

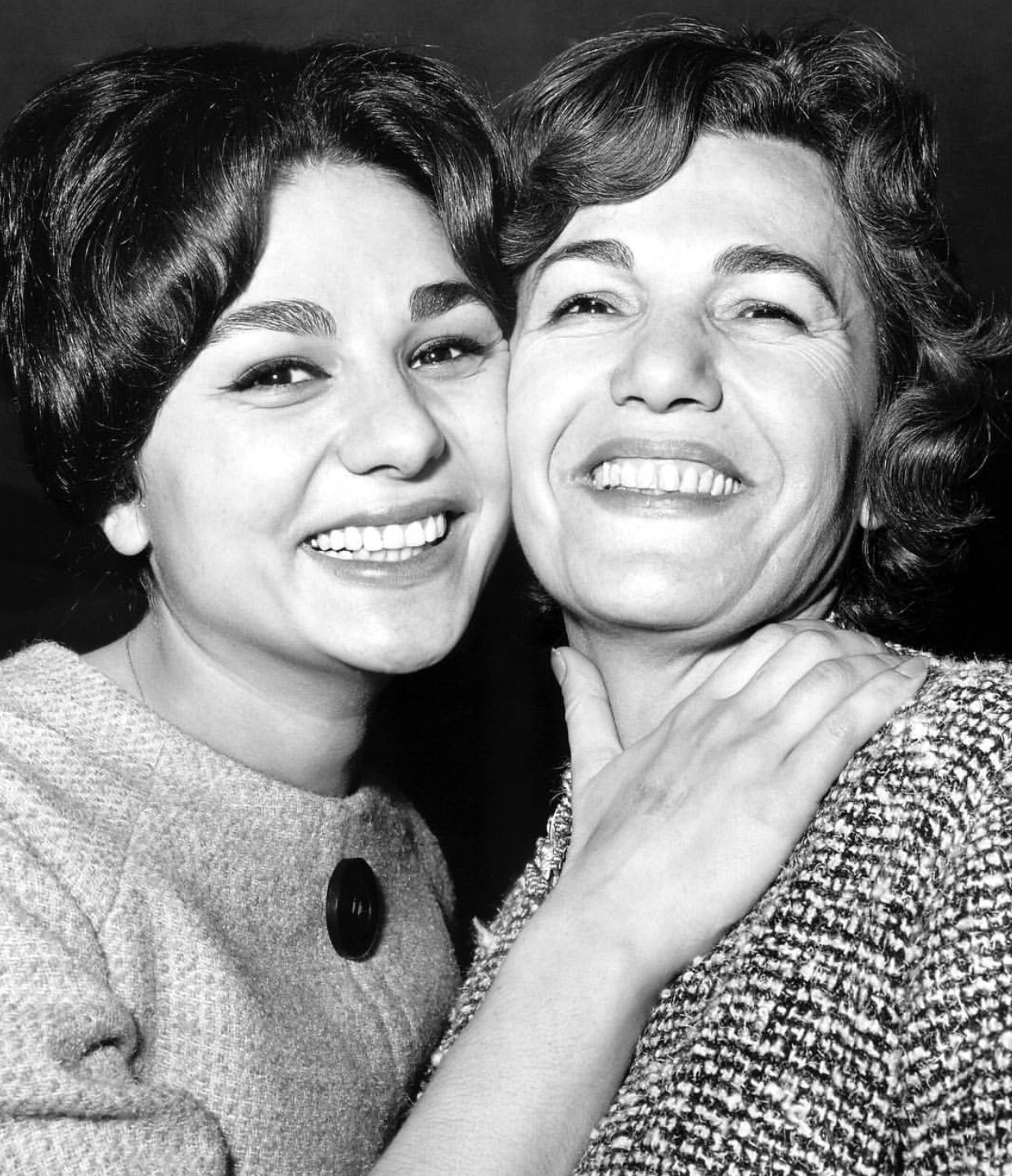
Farideh Ghotbi with her daughter Farah Pahlavi, 1961

Farideh Ghotbi (Persian: فریده قطبی; née Tadji Ghotbi; 1 February 1920 – 29 November 2000), also known as Farideh Diba (فریده دیبا), was an Iranian public figure. She was the mother of Farah Pahlavi (née Diba), the former Shahbanu (Empress) and third wife of Mohammad Reza Pahlavi, the last Shah of Iran. Ghotbi was known for her influence on both her daughter and within the Diba and Pahlavi families.

== Biography ==
Tadji Ghotbi was born on 1 February 1920 in Lahijan, Gilan province, Qajar-era Iran. She was a descendant of the Sufi scholar, Qutb al-Din al-Ashkawari (c. 1601–1664). Ghotbi attended Jeanne d'Arc School in Tehran.

In 1937, she married Sohrab Diba, a captain in the Imperial Iranian Army and a law student, and son of a Persian Ambassador to the Romanov Court in St. Petersburg, Russia (in the late 19th century). They had a daughter, Farah Diba, born on 14 October 1938. In the summers, the family lived in Shemiran to escape the heat. In 1947, her husband Sohrab Diba fell ill and died a year later of pancreatic cancer.

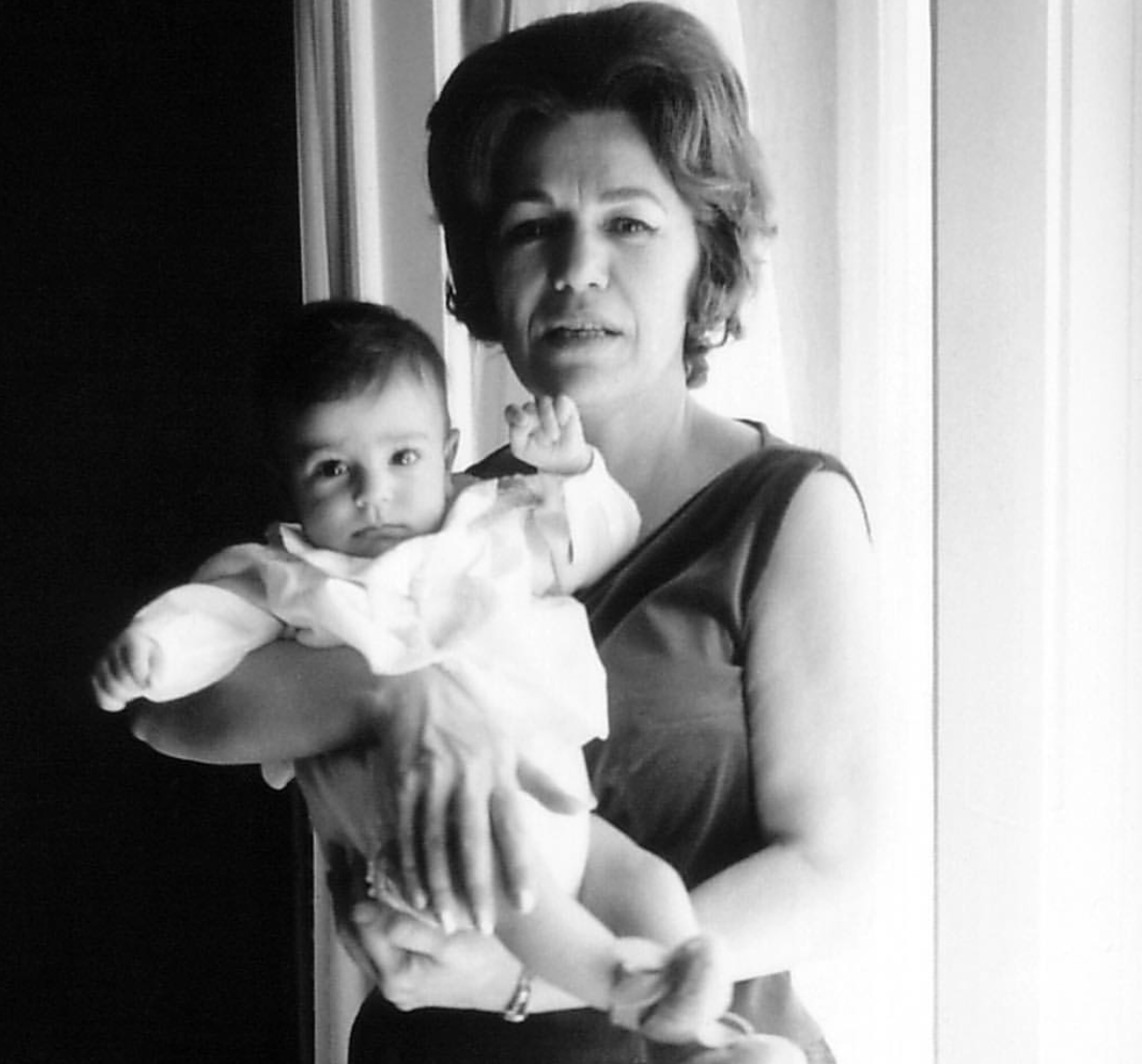
Farideh with her grandson, Crown Prince Reza, 1960

With the marriage of her daughter Farah to Mohammad Reza Pahlavi on 20 December 1959, she became a member of the Iranian Imperial family. She was very close to her younger granddaughter, Leila Pahlavi, and helped raise her. From the beginnings of the Iranian Revolution in 1978, Ghotbi lived in exile in Paris.

== Death and legacy ==
She died on 29 November 2000 in Paris and was buried in the Passy Cemetery. Her granddaughter Leila died seven months later on 10 June 2001 in London, and was buried next to her.

The posthumously published book, Dokhtaram Farah (English: My Daughter Farah) (2001, Behfarin Publications) was falsely attributed as a memoir written by Farideh Ghotbi.

The Sa'dabad Complex in Shemiran, Greater Tehran, houses the Museum of Artistic Creatures, which was once known as the Palace of Farideh Ghotbi.

The Iranian television historical drama The Enigma of the Shah (2014–2016), featured actress Afsaneh Naseri as Farideh.
