= Jeanne d'Arc School, Tehran =

Defunct girls school in Tehran

Jeanne d'Arc School Persian: مدرسه ژان دارک, romanized: Madrese-ye Žāndārk
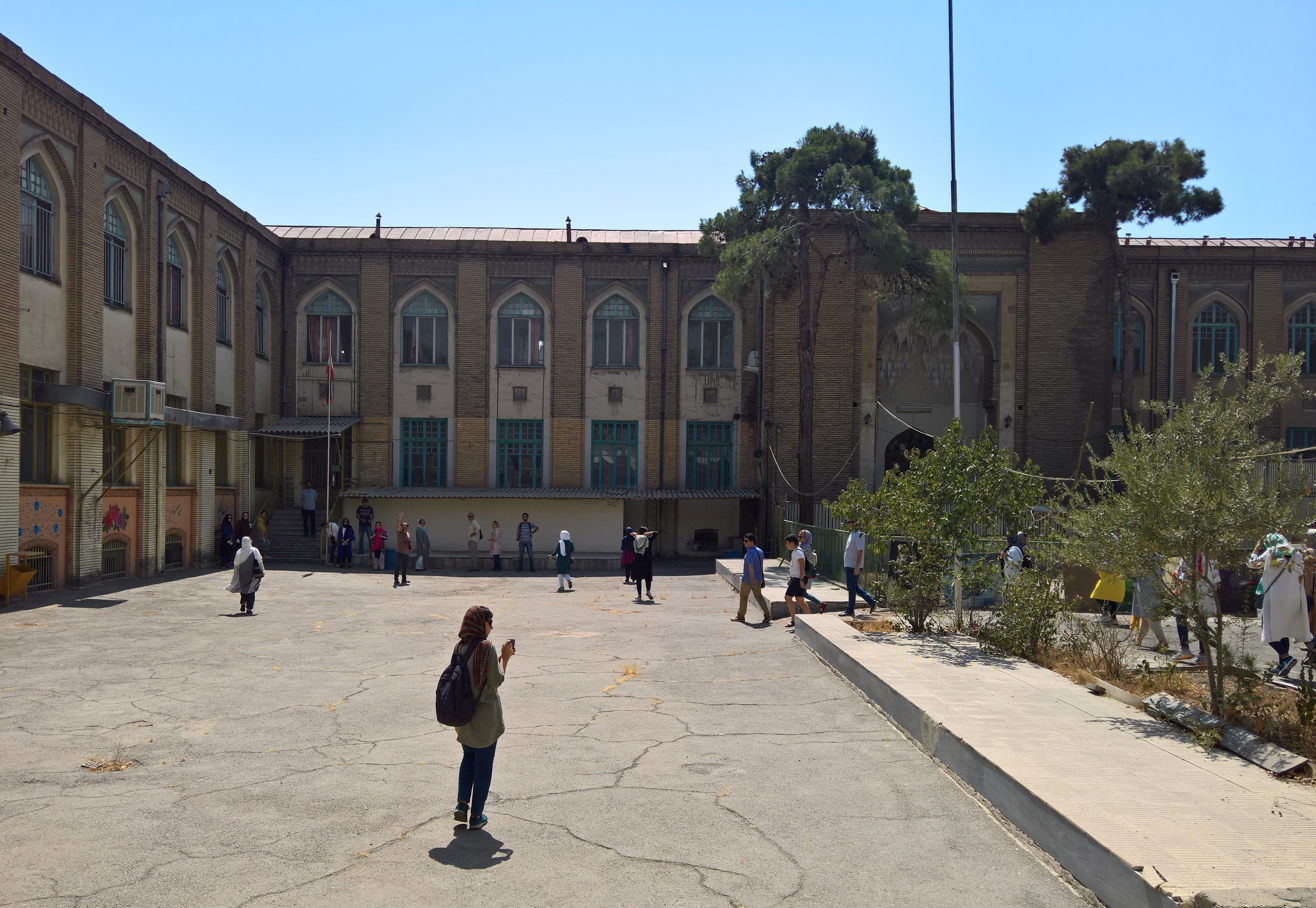
- Jeanne D'Arc School (2018) in Tehran

Location
- Tehran; Iran
- Coordinates: 35°41′45.77″N 51°25′18.91″E

Information
- Type: Girls' school
- Established: 1900
- Founder: Daughters of Charity of Saint Vincent de Paul
- Closed: 1979
- Grades: Primary and secondary
- Enrollment: c. 1,000 (early 1960s); 1,600 (1979)

Jeanne d'Arc School (Persian: مدرسه ژان دارک, romanized: Madrese-ye Žāndārk) was a prestigious French school for girls founded in 1900 in Tehran, Iran. It operated until the 1979 Islamic Revolution. Many members of Iran's upper classes sent their daughters to the Jeanne d'Arc School, and it offered both primary and secondary education. French and English were taught as foreign languages at the Jeanne d’Arc School.

== History ==
The school was founded by the French Catholic Daughters of Charity of Saint Vincent de Paul. Its origins are traced back to the St. Vincent de Paul School founded in 1865, and the St. Joseph School founded in 1880.

In the early 1960s, the Jeanne d'Arc School had c. 1,000 pupils. In the dawn of the Islamic Revolution of 1979, it had 1,600 pupils. As instruction ended at tenth grade, the more prosperous students of the Jeanne d'Arc School usually chose one of two options. They either completed high school (i.e. until twelfth grade) at the Lycée Razi in Tehran which offered mixed boys-girls classes, or they continued their studies abroad.

== Notable people ==
=== Alumni ===
- Farideh Ghotbi
- Shokufeh Kavani
- Minoo Moshiri
- Farah Diba Pahlavi

=== Faculty ===
- Farrokhroo Parsa

== Gallery ==
Images of Jeanne d'Arc School

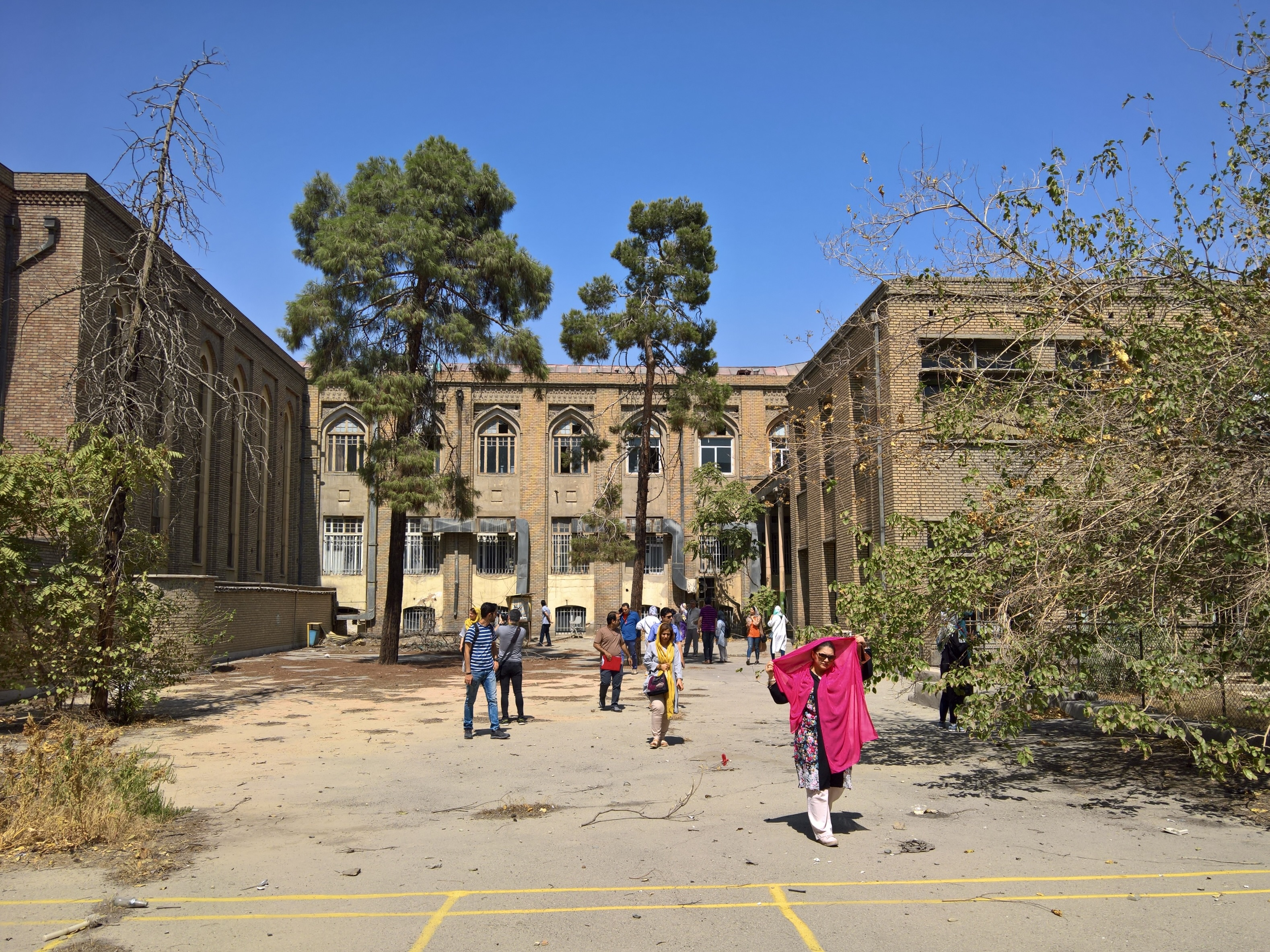
Backyard (2018)

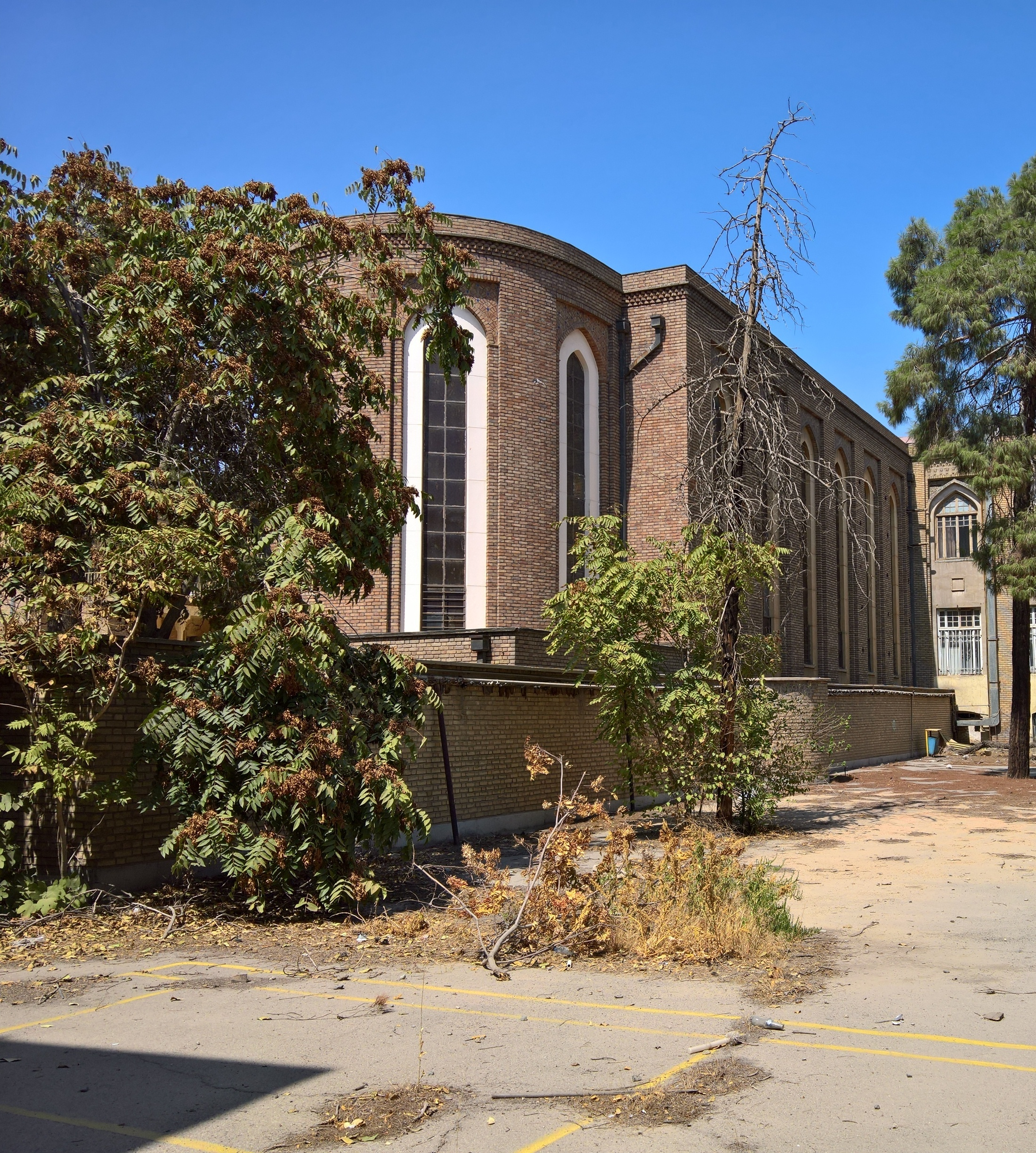
Monastery (2018)

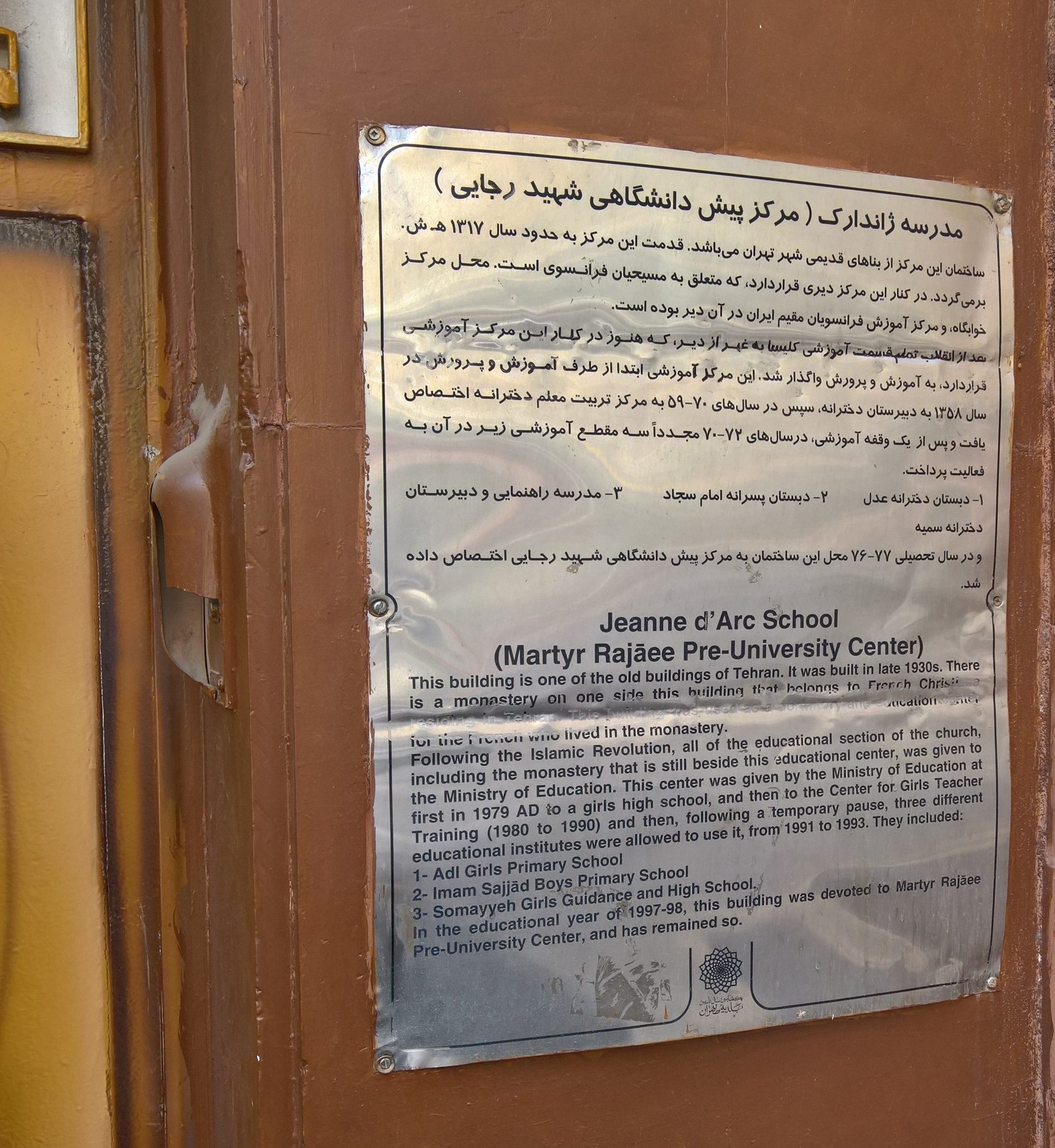
Plaque (2018)

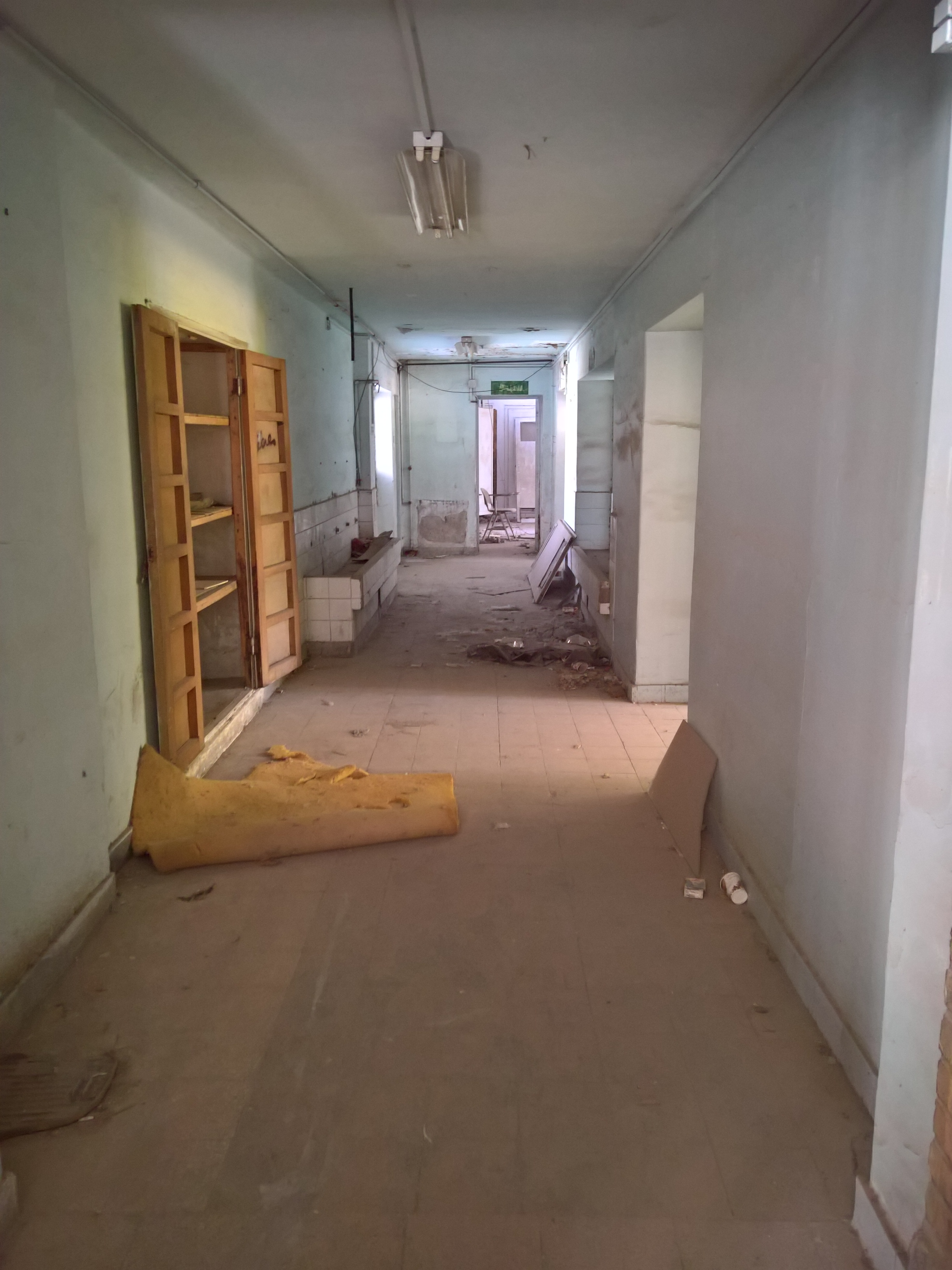
Hallway (2018)

== Sources ==
- van Gorder, A. Christian (2010). Christianity in Persia and the Status of Non-muslims in Iran. Lexington Books. ISBN 978-0739136096.
- Hadidi, Djavad (2000). "France xv. French schools in Persia". In Yarshater, Ehsan (ed.). Encyclopædia Iranica. Vol. X/2: Forūḡī–Fruit. London and New York: Routledge & Kegan Paul. pp. 178–181. ISBN 978-0-933273-41-2.
- Shahvar, Soli (2009). Forgotten Schools: The Baha'Is and Modern Education in Iran, 1899-1934. I.B.Tauris. ISBN 978-0857712714.
