= Shokufeh Kavani =

Australian artist (born 1970)

- doughter-in-law of Nasser Taghvai and Shahrnush Parsipur شکوفه کاوانی عروس ناصر تقوایی و شهرنوش پارسی پور
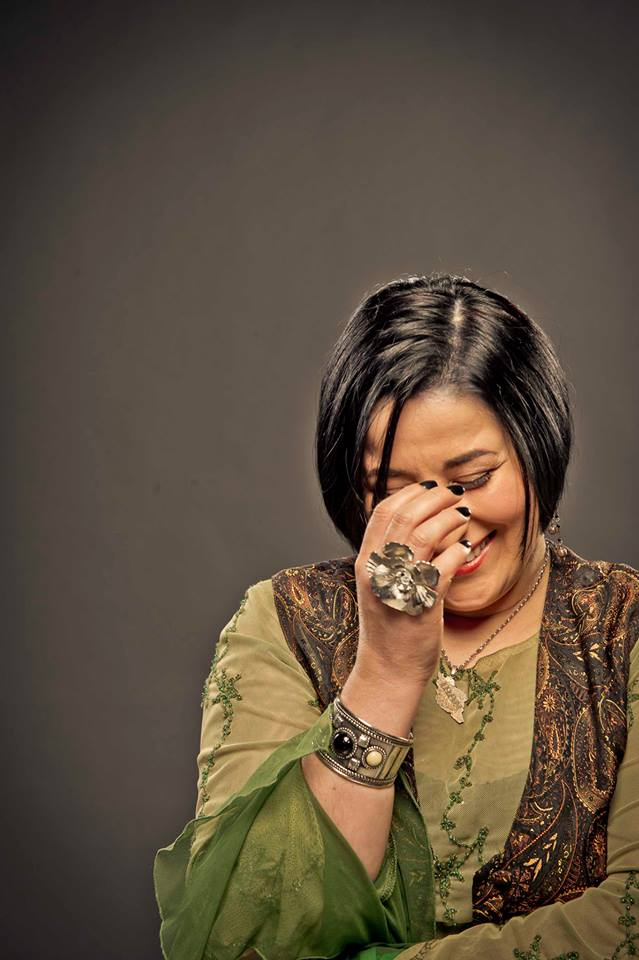
- Photo from Page 6 of the book "Our Story", Published by SBS, Australia
- Born: 1970 (age 55–56); Tehran, Iran
- Other name: Shokoufeh Kavani
- Known for: Painting, translation
- Movement: Abstract painting

Shokufeh Kavani (Persian: شکوفه کاوانی; born 1970) is an Iranian-born Australian contemporary artist, painter, nurse, translator. She is primarily known as a translator and as an abstract painter. She is fluent in Australian English, in addition to her native language Persian. She lives in Sydney.

== Early life and education ==
Shokufeh was born in 1970 in Tehran, Iran. She was only age eight when the Iranian Revolution (1978–1979) took place. She received her education first at the Saadi Primary and Secondary School, and followed by studies at Jeanne D'Arc High School.

She went on to the Bandar-Abbas medical university for a bachelor's degree in nursing, before migrating to Australia as a professional nurse.

== Life and career ==
At age 19, Kavani started painting in reaction to the events around her. The eight-year Iran–Iraq War had a deep impact on her. While in Iran, she carried on painting but never exhibited her work in Iran.

In 1994, Kavani earned a First Certificate in English from the Cambridge University center in Tehran. She started translating "The Whirling Dervishes" (Persian: مولانا و چرخ درویشان) by Ira (Shems) Friedlander, a Best Seller published in 2004 (1382) by Zaryab Publishers. The book is about the whirling dervishes and the ceremonies with which they are involved. The story of Mevlana Jallaledin-Balkhi, known as Rumi in the Western world, is embedded in the narrative. The book has black-and-white photos of the Sema, a Whirling Dervishes ceremony that opens a window to the mysterious and esoteric world of the Dervishes. Ira (Shems) Friedlander took the majority of the photographs. The rest are by Nazih Ozal. The new approach to the history of the Mevlevieh sect and their music over the last 100 years makes the book unique.

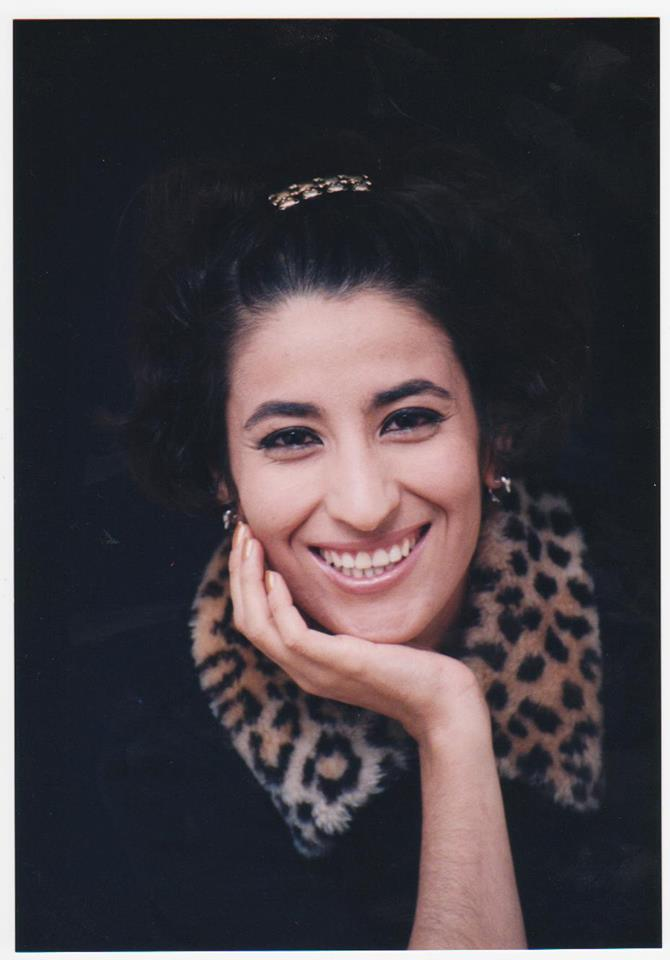
As "Edna Ryan" award winner – 2010 – Australia.

In 1997, Kavani migrated to Sydney, Australia and started working and studying again for her bachelor's degree in Nursing from Charles Sturt University. She also continued painting and in 2003 had her first solo exhibition, "Persian Graffiti", promoted by the Iranian writer, Shahrnush Parsipur. The exhibition gained a great deal of attention in the Australian media. After the 2005 Cronulla riots, she joined the art group " TAH, Art for Humanity " and participated in twelve group exhibitions all over Australia to raise awareness against racism. Some sale proceeds of the group went to an Afghan Charity, Mahboba's Promise, to support Afghan widows and orphans. These humanitarian efforts earned her nominations for the Australian of the Year Award in 2005, 2007, 2008 and also in 2013, and for the Pride of Australian Medal in 2005 and 2007 by The Daily Telegraph newspaper.

Kavani's translation of an article, Dog and the long winter, from a book by Shahrnush Parsipur (Persian: شهرنوش پارسی پور), was tabled in the Conference on Women and Depression in 2007 held in Sydney. In 2008, her painting, Dog and the long winter was chosen for a poster for the Women's Mental Health International Conference in Melbourne, Australia. The English version of the book Dog and the long winter was published in 2011 by Nur Publishing company in America and the author, Shahrnush Parsipur, dedicated the book to Shokufeh Kavani.

Kavani continues to exhibit her paintings regularly. Two of her paintings were featured among the official final selections in the My Favourite Movie Moments exhibition, the 2006 Sydney Film Festival and also her paper appeared in First International Symposium about Iranian Cinema. Two paintings have been selected for 100 years of imprisonment, an exhibition organized in the United States in support of political prisoners in Iran.

In 2006, Kavani was selected to present "Prince Claus Awards" to Dr. Michael Mel in Papua New Guinea – University of Goroka alongside the Dutch Ambassador H.E.Mr. Niek van Zutphen. She also attended the main "Prince Claus Awards" ceremony in 2008 and met the Dutch Royal family and the laureates of the awards. She has also participated in Fictive Days Sixten Kai Nielsen, a project organized by www.wooloo.org for the Berlin Festival in 2008, wherein she played the role of Queen Elizabeth I of England along with seven others playing famous characters in the history of cinema.

Kavani's work was the official selection for the Australian Day special exhibition at the gallery of "At the vanishing point" in Sydney. In 2009, her translation of Anita Heiss's "Who am I? The Diary of Mary Talence" was published in Tehran by Morvarid Publishers (Persian: انتشارات مروارید). This has been positively reviewed in the press by Shahrnush Parsipur (Persian: شهرنوش پارسی پور), Asadollah Amraee (Persian: اسدالله امرایی) and Elaheh Dehnavi (Persian: الهه دهنوی) and acclaimed by the public.

In 2010, Kavani became the first Iranian-born Australian recipient of the Edna Ryan Awards in the category of Art, bestowed by the New South Wales Women's Electoral Lobby to women who have been pioneers in different walks of life.

Kavani currently lives in Sydney, works as a nurse and also completed her post-graduate degree of " Genetic Counselling " from Charles Sturt University, paints and intends to take participate in more exhibitions and works on translating another book. Three of her paintings appeared in 2011 Florence Biennale, Italy.

In July 2015, she married Ali Taghvai, the only son of the Iranian filmmaker Nasser Taghvai and the Iranian writer, Shahrnush Parsipur. In 2019, they published a book of poetry called " on the boat of life " by Mehri Publication house, London, England, which contains Ali Taghvai's poems and Shokufeh Kavani's drawings for his poems. In 2023, they published an extended version of the book with additional poems called "Earthly Verses", via Quip Publishing House, Sydney.

Also in 2019, she took a very active part as the cultural adviser to the Australian author, Clare Atkins in the process of writing Clare's second book Between Us which became the book of the year 2019 and also nominated for so many awards including the prestigious Australian Prime Minister Literary awards.

in June 2022, her art works featured on page 33 of the book Introducing Iranian Artists 40/2021, 40/1400 by curator Mansour Azadkam published in Iran, in a Collaborative collaboration between Galerie Nicolas Flamel, Paris & Tarhe Faza Institute – Fara Group, Iran.

On February 28, 2026, Shokufeh won the Persian Awards bestowed by Radio Neshat, Melbourne for her achievements in Arts and Literature and services to the community, which; it was widely celebrated by the Iranian diaspora.
