= Queenwood School for Girls =

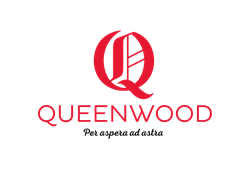

Location
- Mosman, Lower North Shore; Sydney; Australia; 33°49′26″S 151°14′55″E

Information
- Other name: Queenwood
- Type: Independent single-sex primary and secondary day school
- Motto: Per Aspera Ad Astra (Through Struggles to the Stars)
- Denomination: Non-denominational Christian
- Established: 1925; 101 years ago
- Founders: Grace Lawrance and Beatrice Rennie
- Educational authority: NSW Department of Education
- Chair: Dr Amanda Bell AM AO
- Principal: Marise McConaghy
- Employees: 160
- Years: K–12
- Gender: Girls
- Enrolment: c. 900 (2024)
- Campuses: Mosman: 47 Mandalong Road (7–12); 6 Queen Street (K–6); 44 Mandalong Road (Science and Sport Campus); Cnr Esther Road & The Esplanade (Art and Design Campus)
- Campus type: Suburban
- Colours: Red, grey and white
- Affiliations: Association of Heads of Independent Schools of Australia; Alliance of Girls' Schools Australasia; Association of Heads of Independent Girls' Schools
- Website: www.queenwood.nsw.edu.au

Queenwood School for Girls, often abbreviated as Queenwood, is a multi-campus independent non-denominational Christian primary and secondary day school for girls, located in the suburb of Mosman on the Lower North Shore of Sydney, Australia.

Queenwood was established in 1925 by Miss Grace Lawrance and named after Queenwood Ladies' College in Eastbourne, East Sussex, England. It has a non-selective enrolment policy and currently caters for approximately 900 students from Kindergarten to Year 12.

The school is affiliated with the Association of Heads of Independent Schools of Australia (AHISA), the Alliance of Girls' Schools Australasia, and is a member of the Association of Heads of Independent Girls' Schools (AHIGS).

== History ==
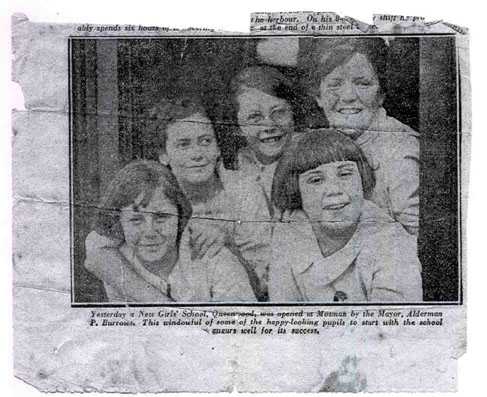
The first five students enrolled at Queenwood, 1925

Queenwood was established on 21 September 1925 by Grace Lawrance, assisted by Beatrice Rennie, as an independent, day and boarding school for girls.

The two women had met in 1918 at the Glennie Memorial School in Toowoomba, Queensland, where Lawrance was Principal, and Rennie first assistant-mistress. They travelled to England in 1921, where they visited many of the best girls' schools. Neither of them was without health issues but they resigned from the Glennie in 1925. They wanted to create a school in Sydney and they chose a large, old house in Mosman.

The school was named "Queenwood" after the now defunct Queenwood Ladies' College at Eastbourne, in East Sussex, on the south coast of England, which had been founded by Miss Lawrance's mother in 1871, and which was similarly located on a hill overlooking the sea. The site at Mandalong Road was chosen because of its view over Balmoral Beach and its northeasterly aspect. As Queenwood grew, the school expanded to a second site at Mandalong Road.

By 1926 Queenwood was a registered secondary school, and three years later Miss Rennie was teaching, running the school and caring for her ailing co-Principal. In 1932, a combination of the Depression, Lawrance's death in November, and Rennie's illnesses, meant that Violet Maude Medway often assisted in managing the school. The two women became co-Principals in 1942. Queenwood prospered despite the Depression and Second World War, and by 1950, Rennie was president of the New South Wales branch of the Headmistresses' Association of Australia. The school phased out its boarding program in the 1950s.

In 1962 Rennie retired as co-Principal but the school remained her home as she worked in the library and helped with the students, as far as her health permitted. In 1966, the school became a non-profit private company, named Queenwood School for Girls Ltd.

The Junior School moved to the Medway Centre at Queen Street, Mosman in 1990, and later the Visual Arts Department moved to a separate site on The Esplanade at Balmoral Beach.

== Principals ==
The following individuals have served as Principal of the Queenwood School for Girls:

| Ordinal | Officeholder | Term start | Term end | Time in office | Notes |
|---|---|---|---|---|---|
| 1 | Grace Lawrance | 1925 | 1931 | 5–6 years | Founder |
| 2 | Beatrice Rennie | 1931 | 1961 | 29–30 years | Co-Principal with Violet Medway, 1942–1961 |
| 3 | Violet Medway | 1942 | 1982 | 39–40 years | Co-Principal with Beatrice Rennie, 1942–1961 |
| 4 | Alison Stalley | 1982 | 1987 | 4–5 years |
| 5 | Judith Wheeldon | 1987 | 1996 | 8–9 years |
| 6 | Kem Bray | 1996 | 2008 | 11–12 years |
| 7 | James Harpur | 2008 | 2013 | 4–5 years |
| 8 | Elizabeth Stone | 2014 | 2023 | 8–9 years |
| 9 | Marise McConaghy | 2024 | incumbent | 1–2 years |

== Campus ==
Queenwood has four campuses, each located in suburban Mosman. The site at 47 Mandalong Road on which Queenwood was founded, was completely redeveloped in 2002/03 and became operational in Term 4 of 2003. This campus caters for the Senior School (Years 7 to 12), and houses most of the academic activities of the School, including classrooms, integrated technology, a 600-seat tiered Auditorium, an underground car park, library, and music and drama facilities. In 2009/10 the Lawrance Campus at 44 Mandalong Road was completely redeveloped and opened for use in Term 3, 2010. The building has a 25m pool, a learn to swim pool, a 110-seat lecture theatre and numerous class rooms and science labs.

== Curriculum ==
Queenwood is registered and accredited with the New South Wales Board of Studies, and therefore follows the mandated curriculum for all years. It offers the International Baccalaureate Diploma Program and the Higher School Certificate in Years 11 and 12.

== House system ==
As with most Australian schools, Queenwood uses a house system through which students may participate in intra-school competitions and activities. The school currently has three houses:

- Queen
- Wood
- School

== The motto ==
The motto is, Per Aspera ad Astra, or 'through struggles to the stars.' (Extended by Miss Rennie to be: 'it is only by struggling to overcome difficulties that we can hope ever to reach our highest ideals.') Miss Rennie said, "Per Aspera precedes Ad Astra and so it is that strength and courage are necessary, for the highest and best are not attained without struggle. Self-control, self-discipline are necessary with strength, to stand up for the right and courage to stick with one's convictions."

== Notable alumnae ==
Alumnae of Queenwood are known as Old Girls, some notable 'Old Girls' of Queenwood include:

Entertainment, media and the arts

- Adelaide Clemens – actress
- Shirley Hazzard – writer
- Dorothy Porter – writer
- Gemma Pranita (Xumsai) – actress
- Madeleine St John – writer
- Phoebe Tonkin – actress as seen in H_{2}O: Just Add Water and The Vampire Diaries spinoff The Originals
- Anna Volska – actress
- Anna McPhee – Director of the Office of Equal Opportunity for Women in the Workplace; first female Chief of Staff to a Liberal Premier in NSW
- Sue Vardon AO – Chief Executive of the Department for Families and Communities, South Australia; inaugural CEO of Centrelink (1997–2004), Chief Executive of the Department of Correctional Services (SA) (1994–1997); Telstra SA Businesswoman of the Year 2005; Recipient of the Centenary Medal 2003
- Anna Chrisp - Australian Ambassador to the Republic of Colombia
- Katherine Bennell-Pegg - Astronaut
- Chelsea White - Journalist
- Sammy Robinson - Social media personality, Founder and owner of One Mile The Label

Sport

- Nicola Barr – First draft pick for the Giants in the inaugural Women's AFL season
- Holly Lincoln-Smith – Water Polo player
- Zali Steggall – former Olympic skier and Member for Warringah
- Matilda Kearns - Australian Olympic Water Polo player

== See also ==
- List of non-government schools in New South Wales
