= Ralph Townsend (headmaster) =

Headmaster, educational consultant

Ralph Douglas Townsend
- Born: December 13, 1951 (age 74)
- Occupations: Headmaster, educational consultant
- Known for: Headmaster of Winchester College and Sydney Grammar School

Ralph Douglas Townsend (born 13 December 1951, in Nedlands, West Australia) is an educational consultant. He was Headmaster of Sydney Grammar School (1989–1999), Oundle School (1999–2005), and Winchester College (2005–2016).

== Early life and education ==
Ralph Douglas Townsend was born in Nedlands, West Australia, on 13 December 1951. He moved to England, where he held teaching appointments at Dover College and Abingdon School. He returned to study at Oxford University, with a dissertation in 1981 on "Hagiography in England in the nineteenth century". He was first Senior Scholar at Keble College, then a Junior Research Fellow, Tutor and Dean of Degrees at Lincoln College, where he was the Anglican chaplain. He resigned from this post in 1985 when he decided to join the Roman Catholic Church.

== Teacher ==
Townsend took up a teaching post at Eton College in 1985 which he left in 1989 to become Headmaster of Sydney Grammar School. While in Sydney, he was Patron of the Australian Musicians' Academy and President of the New South Wales Classical Association. After ten years in that post, he returned to England to become Headmaster of Oundle School. In 2005, he was appointed Headmaster of Winchester College, the first Roman Catholic to hold that post since the English Reformation. In 2011 he was invested a Knight of the Order of the Holy Sepulchre of Jerusalem.

== Educational consultant ==
Townsend is Director of Winton Consult Limited, Chair of Governors of LEAF Academy Bratislava, and Chair of the Advisory Board of Ebba Brahe Skolan Stockholm. He has been a Governor of Terra Nova School, Cheshire, 1999–2003, Old Buckenham Hall School, Suffolk, 1999–2006, Ardvreck School, Crieff, Scotland, 2000–2005, Ampleforth College, North Yorkshire, 2003–2006, Bramcote Lorne School, Nottinghamshire, 2003–2005, Mowden Hall School, Northumberland, 2000–2007, Worth School, West Sussex, 2004-2010 and 2016–2019, The Pilgrims' School, Winchester, 2005–2013, St Swithun's School, Winchester 2005–2013, St John's School, Beaumont, 2007-2016, and Charterhouse School, 2016–2019. From 2005 to 2011 he was a Trustee of the United Church Schools Trust and an adviser to the United Learning Trust. From 2008 to 2016 he was a Governor of Midhurst Rother College and from 2014 to 2019 a Trustee of St George's House Windsor Castle. He was a governor of UWC Dilijan College 2008–2018. He was Chairman of Prep Schools Trust (2017-2022) and Special Adviser to the President of Keio University and President of Keio Academy of New York (2017-2021). He served on the International Development Group of the Jesuit Refugee Service (2016-2023).

== Publications ==
Townsend has written book chapters, articles and reviews on church history, religious literature, and education, as follows:

=== Edited books ===
- (Editor) M.M. Clare, Encountering the Depths, DLT 1980
- (Editor) Faith, Prayer and Devotion, Blackwell 1983
- (Editor) Sanderson of Oundle, Culverwell 2006
- (General Editor) Australian Studies in History & Letters, 4 Vols, SGS Press 1996-2000

=== Articles, chapters, and reviews ===
- "Nicolas Zernov" in Fairacres Chronicle, November 1980
- "Mother Mary Clare and the Anglican Tradition" in Christian, 1981
- "J.H. Newman" and "The Caroline Divines" in A Dictionary of Christian Spirituality, SCM 1983
- "The Catholic Revival in the Church of England" in The Study of Spirituality, SCM 1986
- "E.B. Pusey", "Nathaniel Spinckes", "Peter Sterry", "Darwell Stone" and "Thomas Traherne" in Dictionnaire de Spiritualite, Brussels 1987-1991
- "The Place of Sport in Education" in Proceedings of the Teachers' Guild of New South Wales, 1990
- "The Education Industry" in The Sydney Papers, Vol.2 No. 2 1990
- "Education and Business Ethics" in Foundations No. 6 November 1991
- "Even a Good Education Gives Rise to Problems" in Proceedings of the Teachers' Guild of New South Wales 1991-1992, also in The Educational Forum Vol.58 No. 1 1993
- "The Sins of Success: the Authority to Change" in The Ethics of Teaching and Learning, IPA Education Policy Unit 1993 * "What's Going to Happen to the Tots?" in Independence (AHISA) Vol.19 No. 1, 1994
- "From Here to Downunder and Back Again" in The Isis Magazine 27 2000
- "What We Do Well" in Conference & Common Room 2004
- "The Cambridge Companion to J.H.Newman" in The Way, April 2010

Academic offices
Preceded by Thomas Richard Cookson	Headmaster of Winchester College; 2005–2016	Succeeded by Timothy Roderick Hands
