= Timothy Hands =

Former Headmaster of Winchester College

Tim Hands
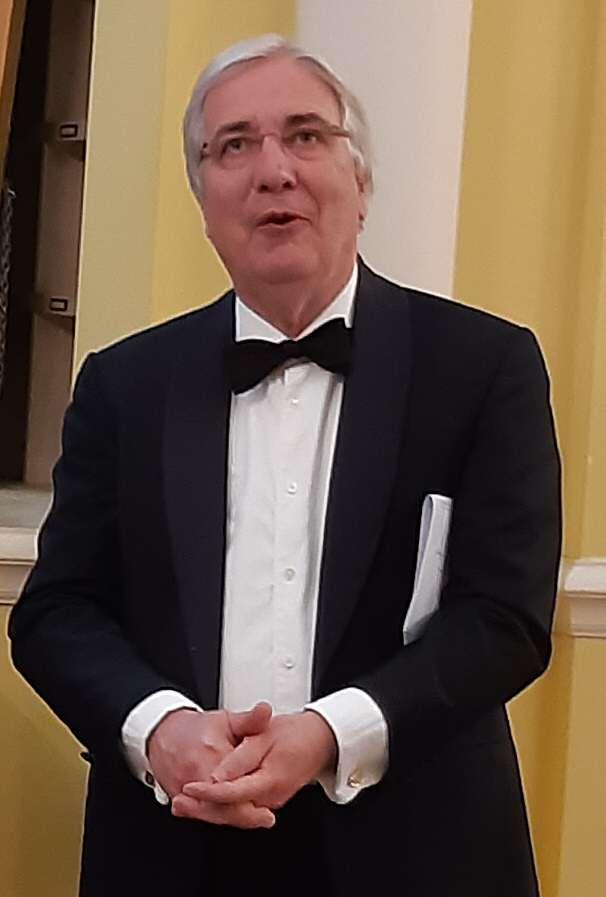
- Hands in 2022
- Born: March 30, 1956 (age 70); London, England
- Occupation: Schoolmaster
- Known for: Headmaster of Winchester College

Timothy Roderick Hands (born 30 March 1956) is an English schoolmaster and writer. Previously the Master of Magdalen College School, Oxford, he was the Headmaster of Winchester College until August 2023.

== Education and early life ==
Timothy Roderick Hands was born into a family of schoolteachers. His father, Rory K. Hands, founded Chiswick Comprehensive School in 1968.

Hands was educated in the state sector, at Emanuel School in London, and later studied the violin at the Guildhall School of Music and Drama, before reading English at King's College London, where he also gained a qualification in Theology. He then became a graduate student at Oxford, where he was senior scholar at St Catherine’s and then Oriel College.

== Career ==
Hands was a lecturer in English at Oriel College before becoming a housemaster at the King’s School, Canterbury, and then Second Master at Whitgift School. In 1997, he became Headmaster of The Portsmouth Grammar School, before moving in January 2008 to Magdalen College School as its 61st Master. Hands has appeared as a spokesman for the independent sector on educational matters, especially partnership between the sectors, and university admissions. He was elected to the Committee of the Headmasters’ and Headmistresses’ Conference in 2003, becoming chairman of its University Committee one year later, and serving in that capacity for seven years. In 2012, he was elected as Chairman of the Conference for 2013–14. He became Headmaster of Winchester College in September 2016. In March 2022, it was announced that he would retire in August 2023.

== Publications ==
Hands has written books on English literature, especially on Thomas Hardy. These include A Hardy Chronology, Thomas Hardy: Distracted Preacher?, and the Hardy volume in Macmillan's "Writers in their Time" series. He contributes to other books about Hardy including the Oxford Reader's Guide and the Ashgate Companion. In 2021, he wrote an illustrated guide to Winchester College's heritage, A Winchester A–Z.

Academic offices
Preceded by Ralph Douglas Townsend	Headmaster of Winchester College; 2016–2023	Succeeded by Elizabeth Stone
