= Beatrice Rennie =

Beatrice Lilias Rennie
- Born: 21 September 1893; Dubbo
- Died: 4 September 1971 (aged 77); Mosman
- Education: University of Sydney
- Known for: co-founder and the headmistress of Queenwood School for Girls
- Successor: Violet Medway
- Partner: Grace Lawrence

Beatrice Lilias Rennie (21 September 1893 – 4 September 1971) was an Australian co-founder and the headmistress of Queenwood School for Girls in Sydney.

== Life ==
Rennie was born in 1893 in Dubbo. Her parents were Lilias (born Millar) and a draughtsman named Charles Edward Rennie. They had both been born in Australia. She was their sixth child and they had two more. In time her family moved to Sydney ending up in the suburb of Mosman. She graduated from the University of Sydney in 1916.

In 1918, she first met Grace Lawrence who was the headmistress of the Glennie Memorial School in Queensland. Rennie was teaching P.E, and humanities as an assistant headmistress. They got on well and went on a trip together in 1921 to Europe. They went to see leading schools for girls together. Rennie continued to teach at the school, looking after the library and the school magazine.

In 1925, she and Grace Lawrence left the Glennie Memorial School and they bought a large house in Sydney. There they started a school for girls that they called Queenwood. The school was founded on 21 September which was Rennie's birthday and the school's roll listed the names of five girls. In 1928 the other significant figure in the schools history, Violet Medway, was employed.

Rennie shared her leadership role with Violet Medway in 1942. Rennie continued to live at the school after she retired in 1962.

Rennie died in Mosman in 1971. The Queenwood school continued noting Lawrence and Rennie as their founders. The school holds a tradition of "raising the flowers" on the school's and Rennie's birthday.
