= Queenwood Ladies' College =

Coordinates: 50.768°N 0.287°E

Information
- Funding type: Private school
- Established: 1871
- Gender: Girls

Queenwood Ladies' College was a private school for girls, opened on a hill overlooking the sea in Eastbourne, East Sussex, England. It was opened in 1871 by a Mrs Lawrance, the mother of Miss Grace Lawrance, founder of Queenwood School for Girls, Sydney. At this time the town was just beginning a period of growth and prosperity and seeing the arrival of many other private schools, thanks to its reputation for health, enhanced by bracing air and sea breezes. Dorothea Petrie Townshend Carew wrote a book about the school.

== Notable former pupils ==
- Bryher (novelist)
- Martita Hunt, actress
- Dorothea Petrie Townshend Carew, writer
- Nellie Kirkham, historian, artist and writer
- Minoo Moshiri, translator, writer
- Dorothy Pilley Richards, alpinist
