= Minoo Moshiri =

- مینو مشیری
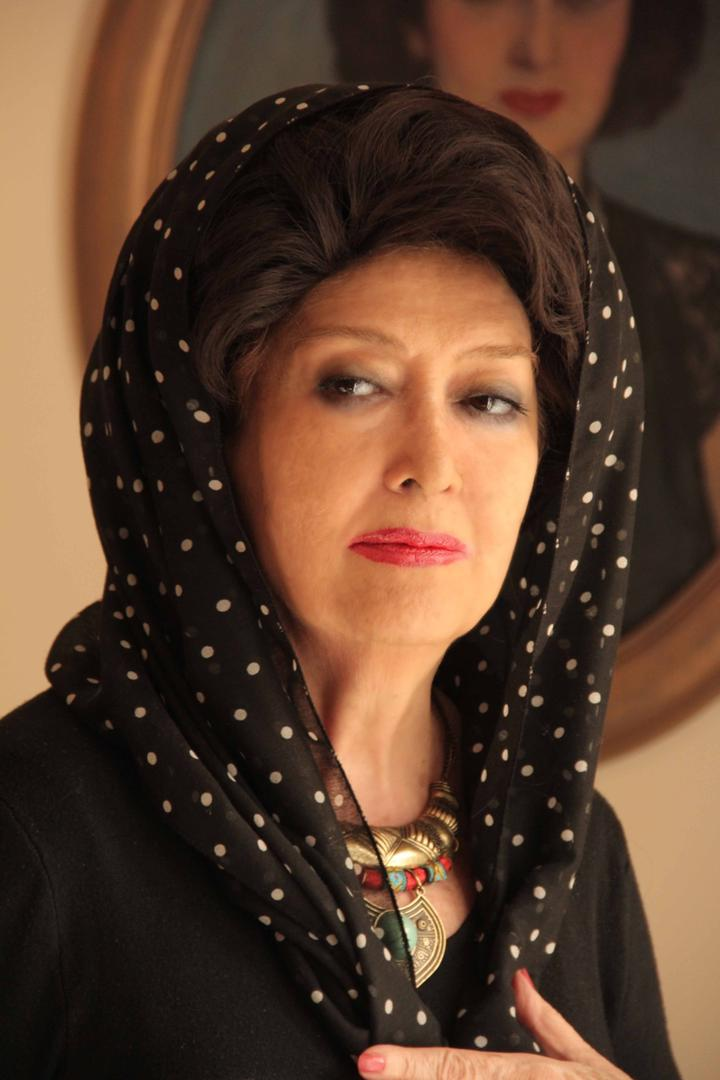
- Born: Tehran, Pahlavi Iran
- Education: University of Exeter
- Occupations: essayist, literary translator, film-critic and journalist
- Writing career
- Language: Persian

Minoo Moshiri (Persian: مینو مشیری) also known as Minou Moshiri, is an essayist, literary translator, film-critic and journalist.

== Early life and education ==
Minoo Moshiri was born in Tehran, Iran. She attended primary and secondary school in the French Ecole Jeanne d’Arc of Tehran. She then left for England to attend the well-known finishing school "Queenwood Ladies' College" in Eastbourne.

She attended the University of Exeter for six years to receive an M.A. Honours Degree in French and English Literature. For her M.A. thesis she chose Diderot and the 18th century and studied with the famous Diderotiste, the late Geneva-born Professor Emeritus Robert Niklaus.

== Career ==
Upon returning home to Tehran, she became an essayist, literary translator, film-critic and journalist and continues to be active as such. She contributes essays, literary-criticisms and other articles as well as film-reviews in Persian, English and French to some dozen literary journals and film-magazines and newspapers.

Her translation of Jose Saramago’s Blindness into Persian is in its 25th edition (2021).

== Awards ==
In 2006, she won Iran’s First Prize in Journalism for Social Satire.

She is a regular at Locarno, Rome, Thessaloniki and Nyon international film festivals. She was a member of the Jury at Locarno’s Critics’ Week in 2006, in Switzerland.

She was a FIPRESCI jury member at Thessaloniki International Film Festival in 2010 in Greece.

She was a FIPRESCI jury member at Thessaloniki International Documentary Festival in 2011.

She was a FIPRESCI jury member at Locarno's International Film Festival in 2013.

Chevalier des Arts et des Lettres de la Republique francaise.2017

== Translations ==
From English or French into Persian:

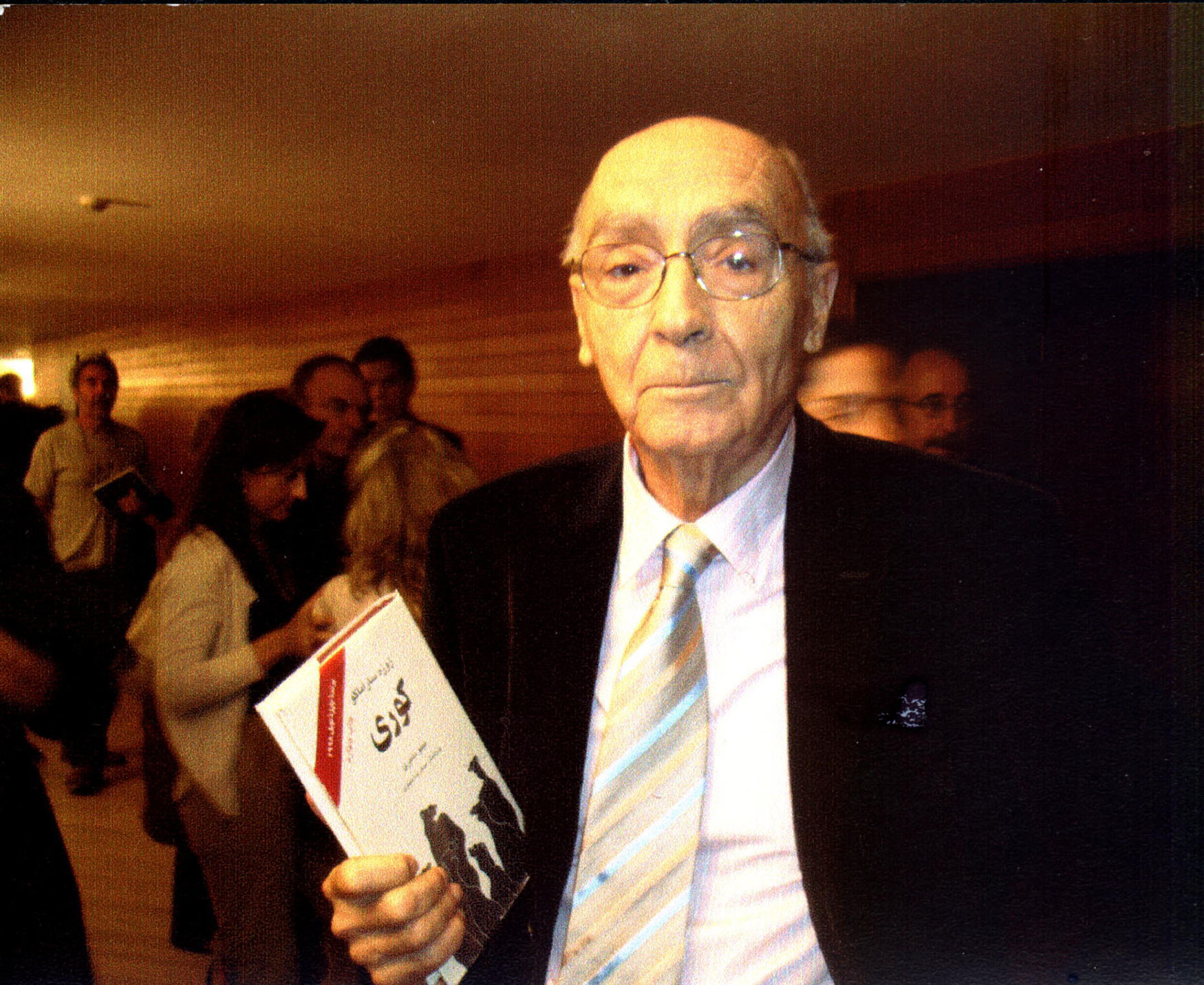
Jose Saramago with a copy of Minou Moshiri's translation of "Blindness" in San Sebastian International Film Festival in September 2006

- Le Neveu de Rameau, Denis Diderot
- Blindness, José Saramago (27th edition)
- The Notebook, José Saramago
- Embers, Sandor Marai (6th edition)
- La Nuit des Chandelles, adaptation théatrale du roman de, Sandor Marai LES BRAISES 2019
- Adolphe, Benjamin Constant (16th edition)
- Jacques the Fatalist, Denis Diderot (11th edition)
- Pierre et Luce, Romain Rolland
- The Life and Times of Michael K, J. M. Coetzee
- The Age of Innocence, Edith Wharton
- Eugénie Grandet and Le Père Goriot (critical studies)
- Gustave Flaubert, Leonard Davis
- Alexandre Solzhenitzin, Alexis Klimoff
- Gabriel García Márquez, R. MacMurray
- George Bernard Shaw, Margery Morgan
- Hedda Gabler, Ibsen (6th edition)
- Tale of Two Cities, Charles Dickens
- Eleni, Nicholas Gage
- Intruder and Interior, Maurice Maeterlinck
- L' Indifferent, Marcel Proust

From Persian into English or French

- The Crystal Garden, a novel by Mohsen Makhmalbaf
- Several short stories by Abbas Kiarostami
- "The Apple"
- "Salam Cinema" and several other Film Scripts by Makhmalbaf
- "Mother’s Guest", film script by Dariush Mehrjui
- "Bemani", film script by Dariush Mehrjui
- "The Willow Tree", film script by Majid Majidi
- "The Gentleman Actor", Houshang Golmakani
- Several short stories published in "Film International" written by Abolfazl Jalili, Kiomars Pourahmad, Sohrab Shahid-Saless, and many others.
- If I had my life again (collected essays) 2023
