= The Glennie School =

Girls' school in Queensland, Australia

Coordinates: 27.5633°S 151.9369°E

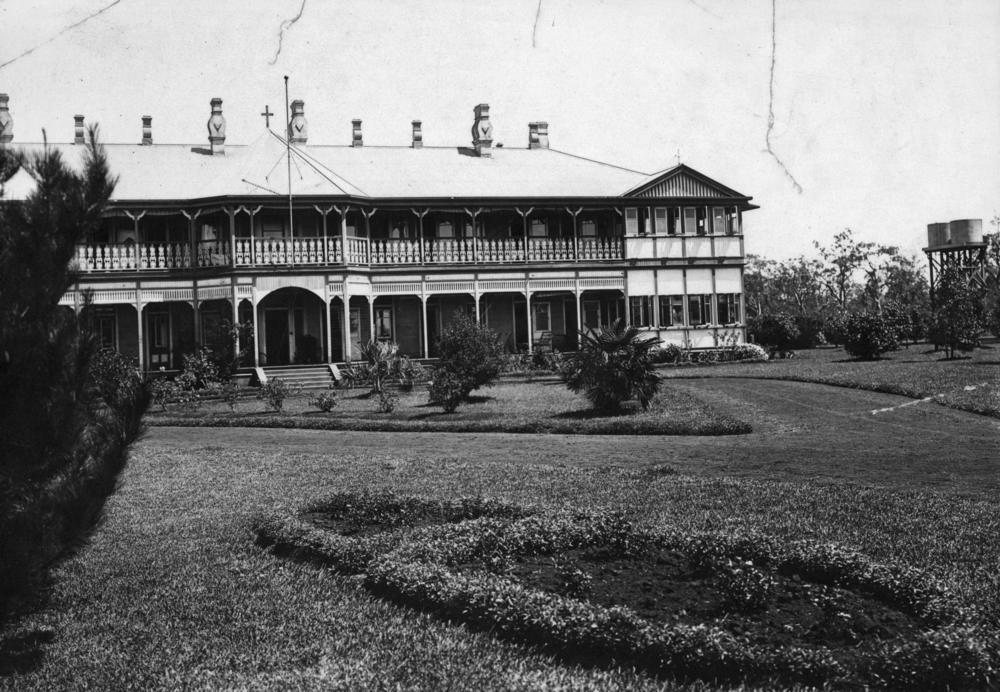
Circular drive in front of The Glennie School, circa. 1925

The Glennie School (formerly the Glennie Memorial School) is a girls' school in Newtown, Toowoomba, Queensland, Australia. It caters for primary and secondary schooling from K–12. It has boarding house facilities and is owned and operated by the Anglican Church.

== Information ==
In 2018, The Glennie School had a student body of 773 students, 3.6% of which were of Aboriginal descent. 160 students were boarders.

== History ==
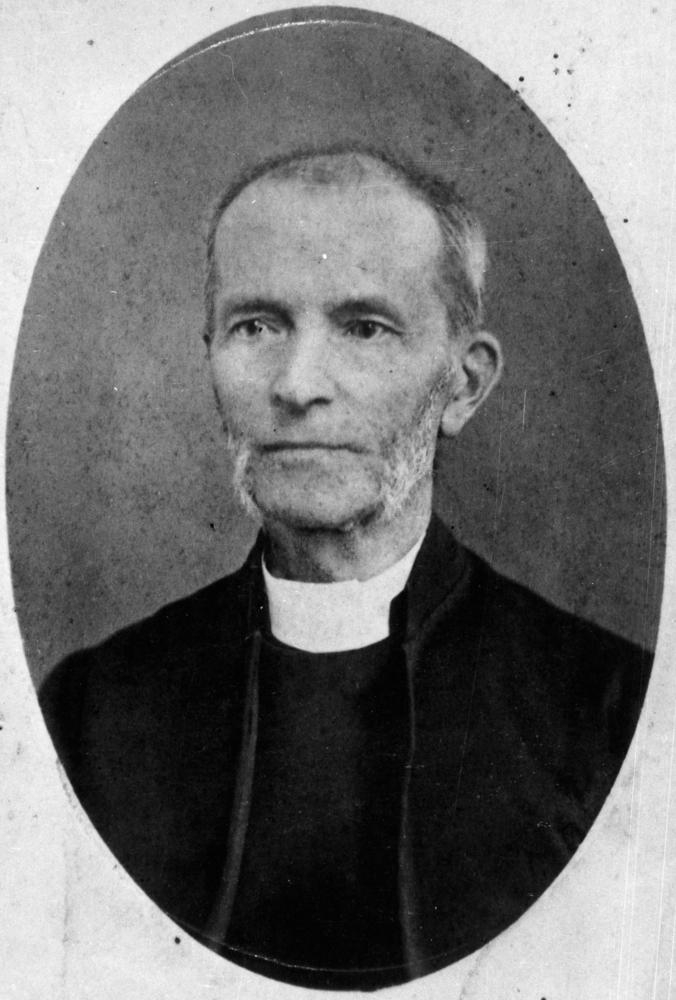
Benjamin Glennie

The first Anglican priest on the Darling Downs was Benjamin Glennie, who spent much of his life raising funds to establish churches and schools for the Darling Downs, including growing and selling vegetables in his garden. He accomplished the construction of four churches in his lifetime but did not establish the schools. However, at his death, he had purchased a block of land in Newtown, Toowoomba and accrued a sum of £1000 towards the construction of the schools. After Glennie's death in April 1900, the Anglican Synod in June 1900 decided to establish a number of Glennie Memorial Schools in memory of Glennie and his work, opening the Glennie Memorial Fund to attract public subscriptions.

Although the original plans were to establish both a school for boys and a school for girls, funds were harder to raise than expected due to the drought on the Darling Downs. In June 1907, the Anglican Church decided to proceed with the establishment of a girls' school because there was an £800 bequest which would lapse if construction did not commence by end of 1907. The choice of a school for girls was made because the church felt this was the area of greatest need as there were a number of secondary schools for boys already available. The initial plan was to hire a house to commence the school while the school building already designed by Toowoomba architect Harry Marks was constructed.

The school was founded in 1908 on its present site as the Glennie Memorial School. The first school building was dedicated on 10 August 1910.

In 1925 the school's principal Grace Lawrence and an assistant head Beatrice Rennie left the school and moved to Sydney where they founded Queenwood School for Girls.

== Notable alumni ==
- Susan Irvine, educator, author and rose authority
- Jean Kent, poet
- Elizabeth Nesta Marks, entomologist
- Annabelle Rankin, Australia's first female Commonwealth Minister
