= Dorothea Petrie Townshend Carew =

Anglo-Irish writer, poet and editor

- Born: Dorothea Petrie Townshend; 8 May 1895
- Died: 3 February 1968 (aged 72)

Dorothea Petrie Townshend Carew (8 May 1895 – 3 February 1968), was an Anglo-Irish writer and the editor of a literary magazine.

== Biography ==
Born on 8 May 1895, Dorothea Petrie Townshend was the daughter of Colonel George Robert Townshend and his wife Petrie Wisdom. She was educated in Queenwood Ladies' College, Eastbourne, East Sussex and went on to study in Oxford. It was in Queenswood she met the novelist Annie Winifred Ellerman also known as Bryher. Carew appears in Bryher's novel Development as Nancy's Downwood acquaintance Eleanor. In 1935 Carew prompted Bryher to purchase the literary magazine Life and Letters To-day. Carew had hoped to become the editor but was instead offered the business manager. However she held out and worked with Robert Herring as editor. Carew worked under the name Petrie Townshend, a name she began using in school. Carew worked on the Magazine until May 1937. Carew married Major Robert John Henry Carew on 25 July 1936 and their daughter was born in 1938. Carew lived in Ballinamona Park, County Waterford, Ireland. Carew also worked as editor for Mrs Alexander Kennedy's translation of works by Paolo Mantegazza. She wrote several other books including an autobiography and a study on the education of girls in France. She was considered a pioneer in the psychological treatment of children. She died in 1968.

== Bibliography ==
- French Education for English Girls. A guide for parents
- The cold table : a book of recipes cold food and drink, (1936)
- Life and letters to-day (editor)
- The legends of flowers (editor)
- Anything Once: An Autobiography, (1971)
- Many Years, Many Girls, (1967)
