= Elizabeth Stone (photographer) =

American photographer

Elizabeth Stone is an American photographer. Stone lives and works in Montana.

Stone's 2016 series 40 Moons was as a set of photographs representing the last 40 months of her mother's life. Her work is included in the collection of the Museum of Fine Arts, Houston.
