= Sydney Grammar School =

Grammar school in Sydney, Australia

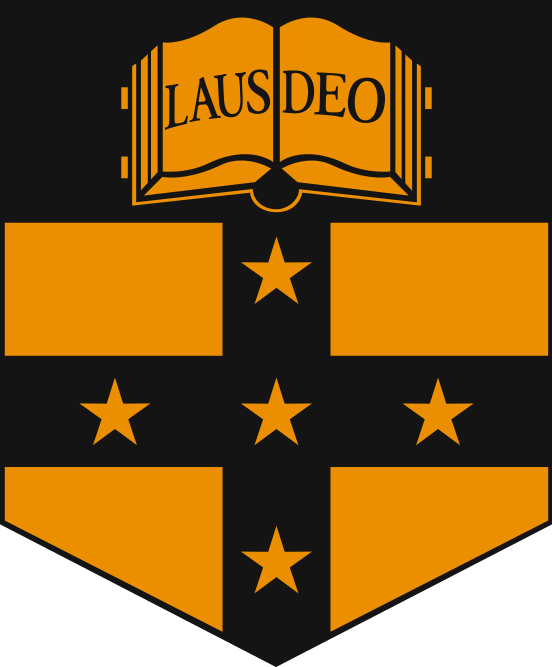

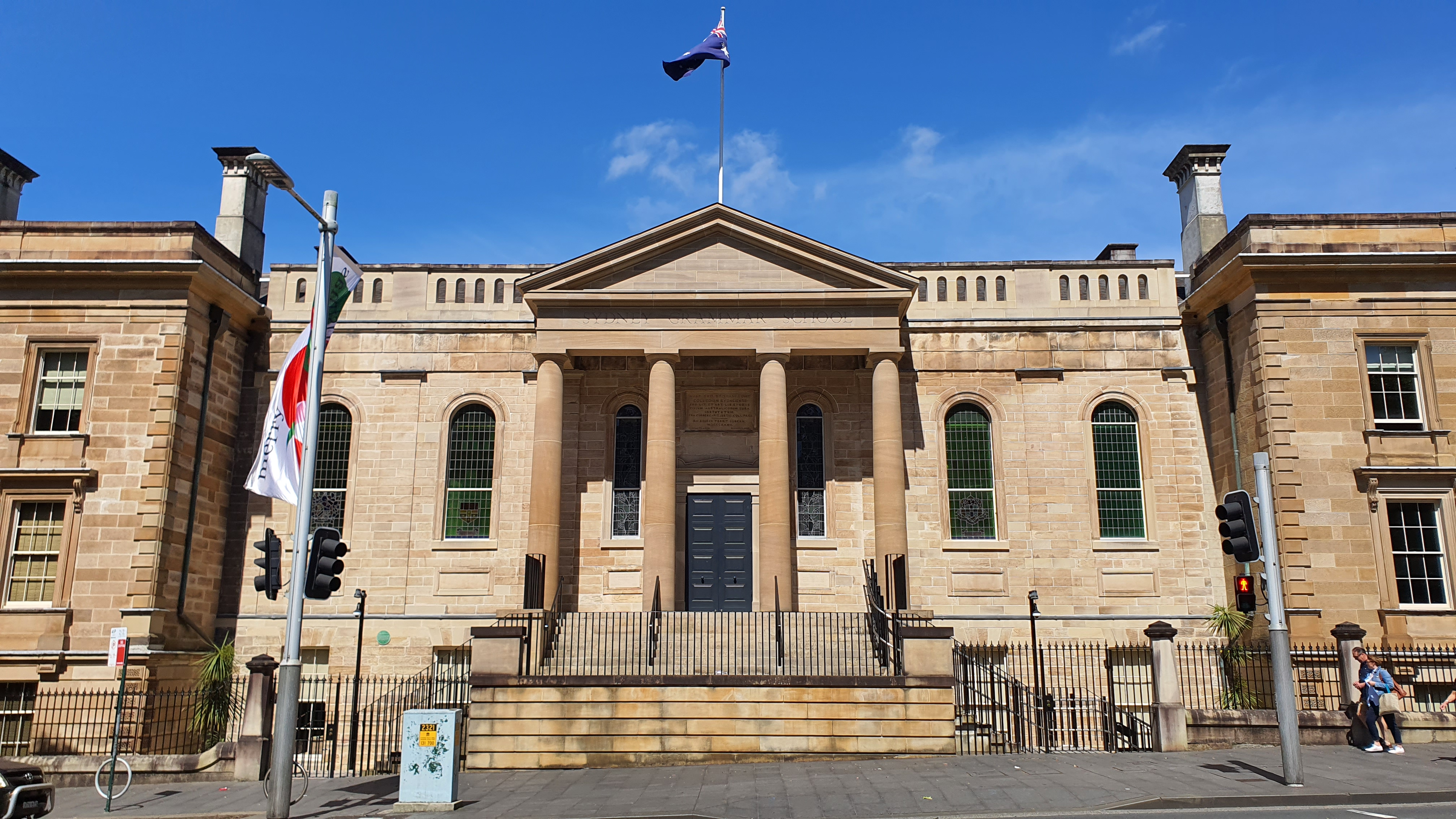
- Front of Sydney Grammar School

Location
- Darlinghurst, Edgecliff and St Ives, Sydney, New South Wales; Australia; 33°52′29″S 151°12′47″E

Information
- Type: Independent, day school
- Motto: Latin: Laus Deo (Praise be to God)
- Religious affiliation: None
- Established: 1857; 169 years ago
- Founder: Laurence Hynes Halloran
- Chairman: Professor Eric Knight
- Headmaster: Stuart M McPherson
- Staff: 63 (Darlinghurst), 15 (Edgecliff), 21 (St Ives)
- Teaching staff: 153 (Darlinghurst), 52 (Edgecliff), 47 (St Ives)
- Gender: Boys
- Enrolment: 1,152 (Darlinghurst), 306 (Edgecliff), 413 (St Ives) (2011)
- Colours: Black and gold
- Athletics: AAGPS
- Alumni: Old Sydneians
- School song: Carmen Sydneiense
- Website: www.sydgram.nsw.edu.au

Sydney Grammar School (SGS, colloquially known as Grammar) is an independent, non-denominational day school for boys, located in Sydney, Australia.

Incorporated in 1854 by an Act of Parliament and opened in 1857, the school claims to offer "classical" or "grammar" school education thought of as liberal, humane, pre-vocational pedagogy.

As of 2006, Sydney Grammar School had an enrolment of approximately 1,841 students from kindergarten to Year 12, over three campuses. The two preparatory schools (K-6), are located at Edgecliff in Sydney's Eastern Suburbs, and St Ives, on the Upper North Shore. The College Street campus caters for students from Forms I to VI (Years 7–12), and is located in Darlinghurst.

The school is affiliated with the Association of Heads of Independent Schools of Australia (AHISA), Junior School Heads Association of Australia (JSHAA), Headmasters' and Headmistresses' Conference, and is a founding member of the Athletic Association of the Great Public Schools of New South Wales (AAGPS).

As of 2026, Sydney Grammar School (College Street) had an average annual school fee of A$52,410 per student.

== History ==
=== Foundation ===
Collectible Cigarette card featuring the Grammar colours and crest, c. 1910s

The Sydney Public Free Grammar School was opened in 1825 by Laurence Hynes Halloran, born County Meath, Ireland (1765–1831). Previously, Halloran had operated a private school in Exeter, England, however fled in 1796 due to debts, after being accused of immorality. It subsequently emerged that his degrees (in divinity) were self-awarded. He eventually returned to Britain but was arrested for forgery and transported to the penal colony of New South Wales, arriving there in 1819. He was immediately granted a ticket-of-leave.

In 1854, Sydney Grammar School (SGS) was incorporated by an Act of Parliament and acquired the land and building in College Street which had been temporarily occupied by the newly founded University of Sydney in 1852. It was opened on 3 August 1857, specifically as a feeder school for the university.

The preamble of the Sydney Grammar School Act 1854 states:

It is deemed expedient for the better advancement of religion and morality and the promotion of useful knowledge to establish in Sydney a public school for conferring on all classes and denominations of Her Majesty’s subjects resident in the Colony of New South Wales without any distinction whatsoever the advantages of a regular and liberal course of education.

The act provides that the trustees of the school shall consist of twelve persons, of whom six shall be persons holding the following offices respectively:

- The Honourable the Attorney-General of New South Wales
- The Honourable the President of the New South Wales Legislative Council
- The Honourable the Speaker of the New South Wales Legislative Assembly
- The Chancellor of the University of Sydney
- The Principal Professor of Classics of the University of Sydney
- The Senior Professor of Mathematics of the University of Sydney

The act also provides that the Governor of New South Wales shall be the official visitor of the school.

=== Site history ===
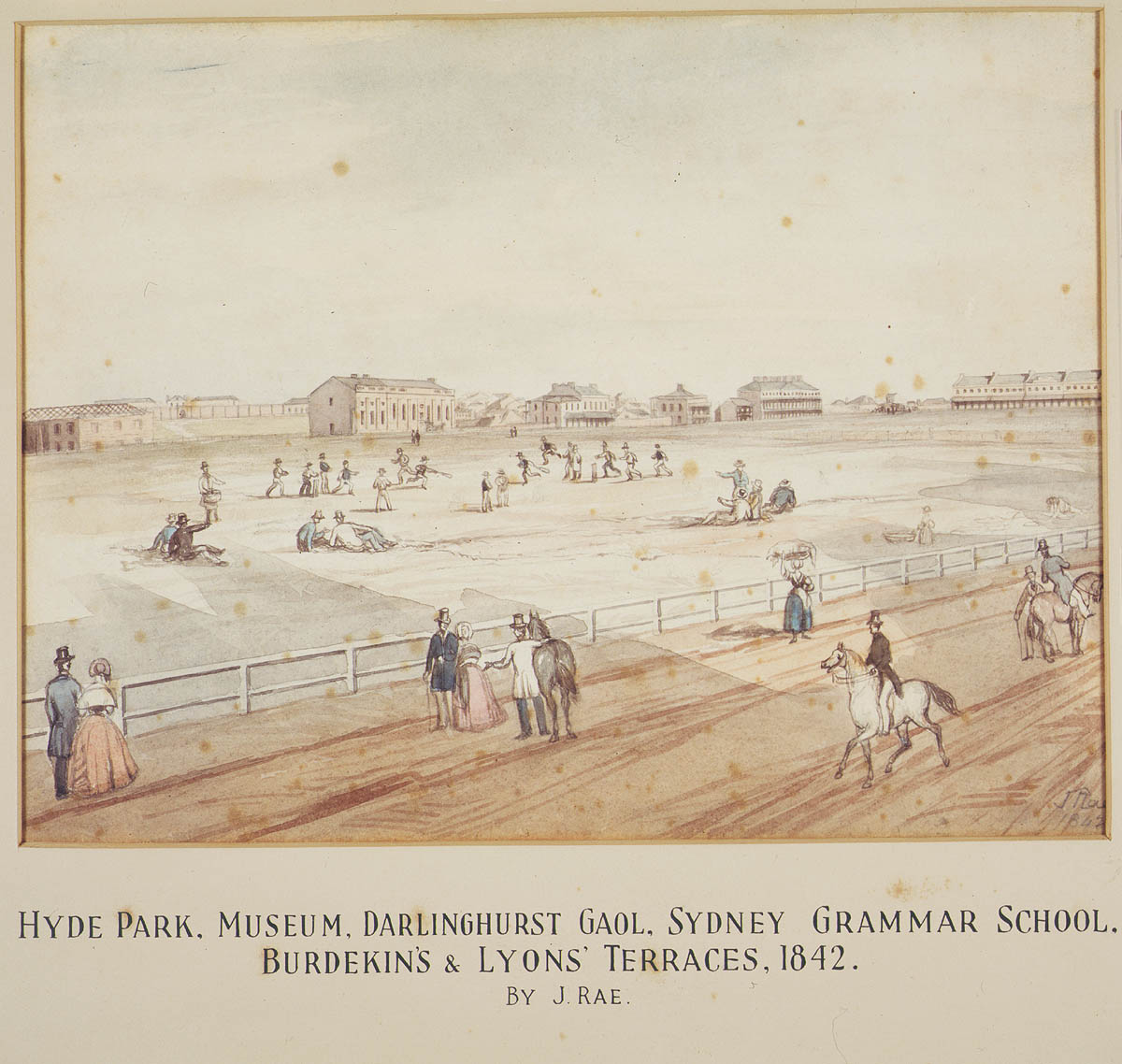
Hyde Park with Sydney Grammar School (at that time Sydney College) in the distance, 1842

Sydney Grammar School is the oldest school still in use in the City of Sydney, and is historically the site on which the University of Sydney began. The school buildings also contain examples of early building materials and techniques in pre-Federation Australia.

The site was founded as The Sydney College in 1830, and the following year began operations in a new building in Hyde Park designed by Edward Hallen. It consisted of a single large room (now known as "Big School") with basement rooms beneath. Sydney College continued despite financial difficulties until 1853, when it was taken over by the fledgling University of Sydney until such time as the present Grose Farm site was ready for occupation. The site was then sold in 1856 to the trustees of the newly incorporated Sydney Grammar School, which had been established and endowed with a building fund by Act of Parliament. Edmund Blacket was commissioned to design extensions to the south and north of the Hallen building (now the North and South Blacket rooms), which were completed in 1856 and 1857 respectively. The "Big School" building became central to the Colonial Architect, James Barnet's vision for the cultural focus of Sydney Town.

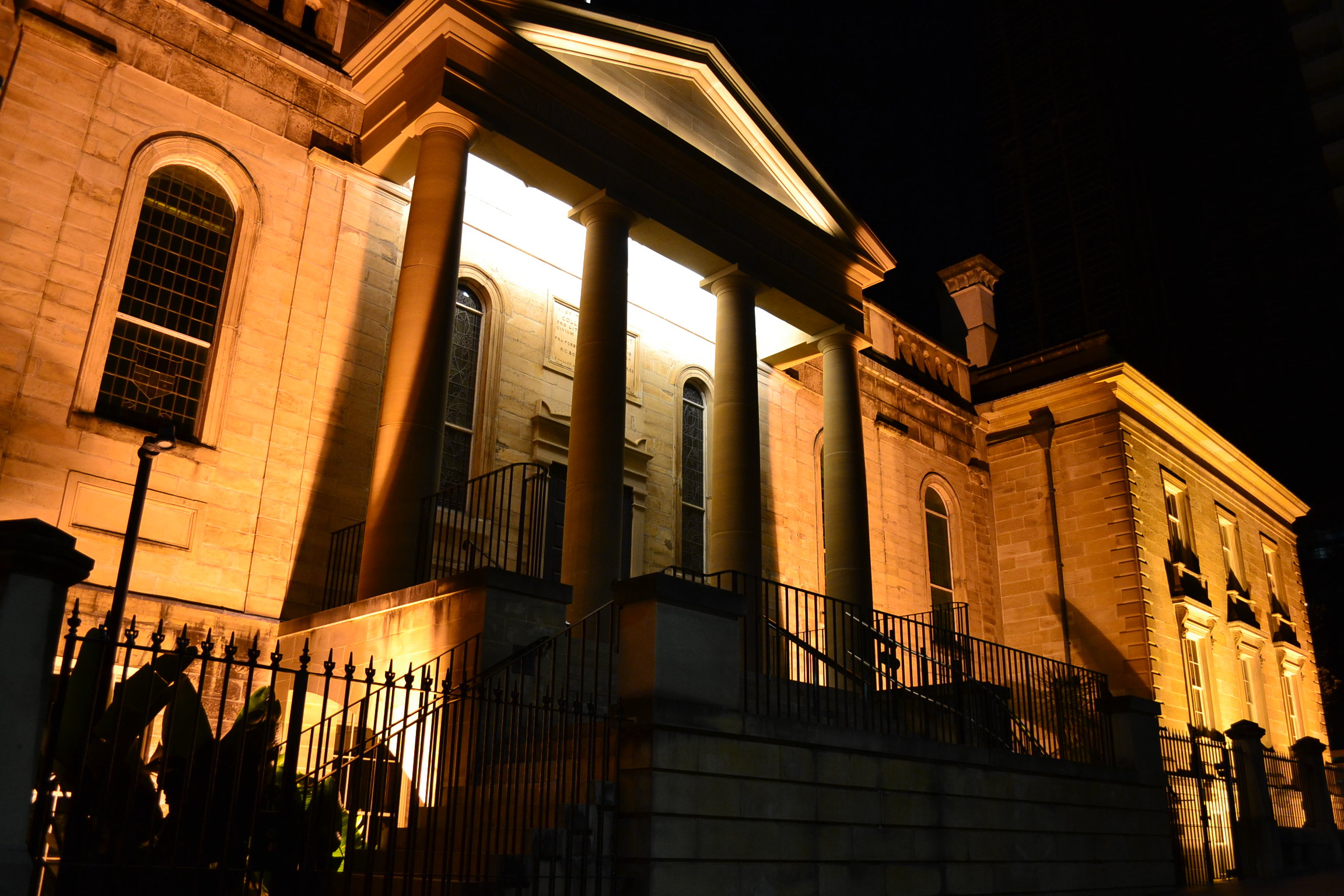
Sydney Grammar School at night

The War Memorial wing, named for its position behind Big School's monument to the Great War, was built at the northern end of Big School in 1953 by the Scott brothers, at the cost of its double staircase. In 1876, the main building was extended to the east by Mansfield Brothers, and this extension was itself extended to the north and south in 1899 by John W Manson. The Science classrooms on Stanley Street were built in 1889–90. Other early buildings on the site, now demolished, included the Sergeant's Lodge, an ablutions block (known as the "White House") on Stanley Street, and a former postal sorting office on Yurong Street (now the Palladium building).

=== Today ===
Sydney Grammar is a private school. Each year up to 26 full scholarships are offered to students who show academic promise and who perform well in the scholarship examination. It is also regarded for its academic results: for example, in national government testing ('NAPLAN' testing), it is the best performing private school nationwide, and a high performer in the New South Wales Higher School Certificate with over 50% of graduates receiving a 95 ATAR ('Australian Tertiary Admissions Ranking') or higher between 2009 and 2023.

Sydney Grammar is near the Sydney central business district. The campus consists of multi-storey buildings (of up to eight floors) in a concrete landscape setting. The school is on the eastern side of Hyde Park, Sydney, next to the Australian Museum, and extends from College Street to Yurong Street. The designs of the school's buildings illustrate many different architectural eras: "Big School" (dating from the early 19th century colonial era), the North and South Blacket buildings (annexed onto either side of "Big School" and completed in the 1850s), the original (old) Science building (1891), the Science laboratory block (1960s), the Palladium building (an example of 1970s Modernist architecture), the Stanley Street building and Alastair Mackerras Theatre (AMT) (1980s), and the A. B. 'Banjo' Paterson Library (1990s).

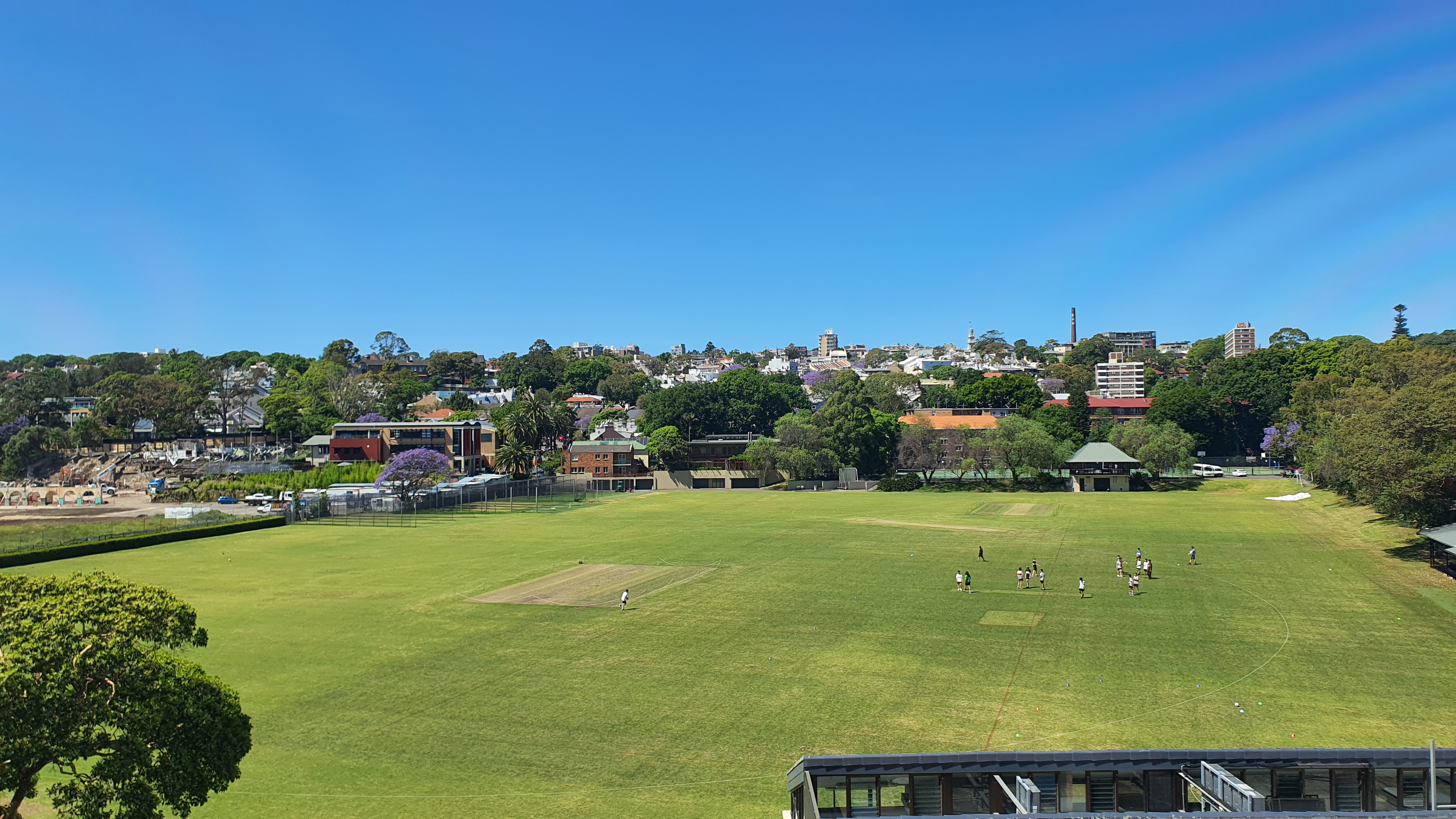
Weigall Sports Ground overlook

Weigall, the school's sportsground (named after former Headmaster Albert Bythesea Weigall), is located at Rushcutters Bay next to the Edgecliff Preparatory School and includes tennis courts, cricket nets and three fields for cricket, rugby and football. It is routinely used for Saturday sports matches, physical education and as a recreational area for Grammar's Edgecliff Preparatory School next door. There is also a gymnasium at College Street and rowing facilities at the school's boatshed at Gladesville.

In May 2005, Headmaster J. T. Vallance announced that the school would lead a consortium to purchase 30 Alma Street Paddington, known as White City, from Tennis New South Wales, thus extending the Weigall grounds substantially. In 2006, development applications to subdivide the White City tennis courts (numbered DA 20/2006 and DA 302/2006) were lodged with Woollahra Council to develop the site to accommodate more tennis and basketball courts; these were passed.

In 2009, the school began the construction of a new, underground multi-purpose hall featuring a seating capacity of over 1,500 seats, now called the John Vallance Hall (formerly The New Hall from its opening until 2017). The hall was officially opened by the headmaster on 18 August 2011 with a celebratory concert featuring performances from a large number of Grammar boys past and present.

== Headmasters ==
The current acting headmaster of Sydney Grammar School is Philip Barr, who was appointed after the departure of Richard Malpass in August 2025. He will be replaced by the thirteenth headmaster Stuart McPherson in January 2026.

Years	Sydney College
1825–1827	Laurence Hynes Halloran
1835–1841	William Timothy Cape
1841–1846	Thomas Henry Braim, MA
1847–1849	David Patterson
1850	Charles Woodward, LLB
Years	Sydney Grammar School
1857–1866	William John Stephens, MA
1867–1912	Albert Bythesea Weigall, CMG, MA
1913–1920	Henry Newman Penrose Sloman, MC, MA
1920–1923	Arthur Henry Shakespeare Lucas, MA, BSc
1923–1939	Herbert Stanley Dettmann, MA, BCL
1940–1950	Frederick George Phillips, MA
1951–1964	Colin Oswald Healey, OBE, TD, MA
1965–1968	Samuel Peter Truman Houldsworth, MA, DipEd
1969–1989	Alastair MacLaurin Mackerras, AO, MA
1989–1999	Ralph Douglas Townsend, MA, D.Phil.
1999–2017	John Taber Vallance, MA, PhD
2017– June 2025	Richard B Malpass, BA, DipEd, PhD
June 2025 – 2026	Philip G Barr, BA, DipEd (Acting)
2026 –	Stuart M McPherson, MA

== Co-curriculum ==
=== Music ===
SGS has won the AMEB Music Shield 23 times in the past 25 years. Two-thirds of pupils in the school play a musical instrument or are involved with music in some way. SGS has scores of musical groups in mostly classical, chamber and jazz styles. The School Orchestra engages in both national and international tours. In 2025, a combined schools orchestra will be performing in independent schools in Hong Kong. Grammar's choir program involves hundreds of students, old boys, and parents, participating in its many annual concerts. The school's senior a cappella group is known as The Grammarphones and is composed of the best tenors, basses and baritones in the senior years. The school's senior jazz orchestra, the Sydney Grammar School Jazz Orchestra, is a regular feature at the Manly Jazz Festival.

SGS embarked on a five-year program entitled "Bach: 2010", in which all the known choral cantatas of Johann Sebastian Bach were performed in a series of concerts between 2005 and 2010. Sydney Grammar is one of the few institutions in the world that has engaged in such an exercise and was aided by the Mander organ in the Big School. A performance has been held every year since by head of practical music studies, Robert Wagner, on the Bach's birthday.

Under the current Head Master, an organic rock-&-roll movement has emerged and is currently thriving. The end of 2004 saw the consummation of years of practice in the first Grammarpalooza rock concert, which included the musical style of Old Boy band, Dappled Cities Fly.

=== Sport ===
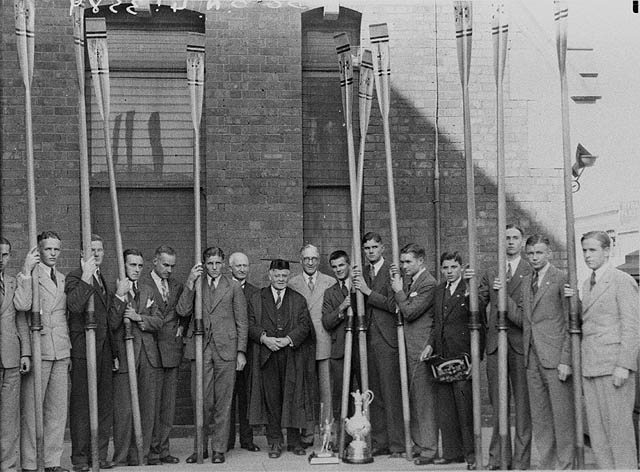
Head of the River crew, 1934

Sydney Grammar School is a member of the Athletic Association of the Great Public Schools of NSW (GPS), Australia's oldest school sporting association. GPS sporting events include rugby union, football, cricket, tennis, volleyball, cross country, basketball, rowing, swimming, athletics, rifle shooting, and debating. The school also competes in fencing and chess competitions.

Grammar participates in the annual Tri-Grammar competitions, a series of cricket competitions between the Firsts teams of Sydney Grammar School, Melbourne Grammar School and Brisbane Grammar School. Sydney and Melbourne Grammar School also compete for "The Bat" in the same competition. The Sydney–Melbourne match dates back to 1876, and in 1976, to mark the centenary of this rivalry, a "Bat" was struck, with the winner of the annual match taking possession. The bat was donated by John Crawford, the father of the captain of the 1976 premiership winning side Andrew Crawford.

The school launched its rowing program in 1878, and has maintained it since. Competition in rowing culminates in the Riverview Gold Cup for Junior Crews and the Head of the River for Senior Crews. Grammar's boatshed is on the Parramatta River at Gladesville.

On 2 April 2011, Sydney Grammar School first eight won the Major Rennie Trophy at the AAGPS Head of the River. This marked the first victory for the school since 1978. In its history, Grammar has won the race sixteen times, the most after the Shore School. Many rowers have gone on to row in Varsity Crews at a university level. In the 2014–2015 Harvard University rowing roster, Sydney Grammar had the most rowers out of any high school globally and two Sydney Grammar rowers were in Harvard's top crew (First Varsity Eight).

=== Academic extension ===
The school operates academic extension programmes in both sciences and humanities, which includes olympiad programmes and hosting visiting scholars who spend time teaching and giving a public lecture. Notable scholars have included metaethicist Simon Blackburn, science and medical historian Sir Geoffrey Lloyd, zoologist Andrew Parker, astronomer and 1999 Young Australian of the Year Bryan Gaensler, historian Sir Christopher Clark, professor of English Dame Marina Warner, professor of Greek Richard Hunter, and composer Robin Holloway.

Pyrimethamine structure

As part of an academic extension activity, a group of year 11 students attempted to prepare the medication pyrimethamine (sold as Daraprim) in 2016. Pyrimethamine is on the World Health Organization's List of Essential Medicines, the most important medications needed in a basic health system, for both adults and children. It is used to treat toxoplasmosis, cystoisosporiasis, and malaria (in combination with sulfadoxine). It received significant attention when its manufacturer in the United States was acquired by Turing Pharmaceuticals, and its CEO Martin Shkreli decided to increase the price from US$13.50 to US$750 a dose. Hence, a group of year 11 students from Grammar, supported by Matthew H. Todd from the University of Sydney and the Open Source Malaria consortium, have prepared pyrimethamine. The students started with 17 g of (4-chlorophenyl)acetonitrile (which is available from Sigma-Aldrich for $36.50 per 100 g) and prepared 3.7 g of pyrimethamine, which is about US$110,000 at Turing's prices.

Their work has attracted attention from around the world, being reported in The Independent, the Daily Telegraph, and BBC News in the United Kingdom, the Washington Post, New York Daily News, and U.S. News & World Report in the United States, among others. By replacing expensive chemicals with alternatives available in a high school laboratory, they demonstrated that the synthesis can be carried out fairly simply and safely, and at a cost of approximately A$2 per dose. Business magazine Forbes described the work as figuratively "punch[ing] Martin Shkreli in the face" and as raising questions about pharmaceutical companies which do not do substantial amounts of research. Unfortunately, as a consequence of the closed distribution model which Turing employs in the United States, any competing company seeking to market a generic alternative to Daraprim (including using the approach the boys developed with their teacher) would need to compare their product with a sample of Daraprim provided directly by Turing; if Turing refuses to provide that sample, the competitor would need to undertake a complete new clinical trial, which creates a prohibitive barrier to entering the market. The boys are quoted making comments highly critical of Shkreli's and Turing's behaviour, and have been applauded on social media with comments that their work highlights Shkreli's greed, though he has minimised their achievement.

Shkreli subsequently posted a video about the achievement, declaring his "delight" about students entering the STEM field, describing them as "proof that the 21st century economy will solve problems of human suffering through science and technology", and stating that "[w]e should congratulate these students for their interest in chemistry and all be excited about what is to come in the STEM-focused 21st century." The students presented their work at the Royal Australian Chemical Institute's NSW Organic Chemistry symposium alongside students at fourth-year undergraduate and postgraduate levels, as well as postdoctoral researchers.

=== Clubs and Societies ===
The school has numerous clubs and societies for students. Notable examples include:

- Australian Air Force Cadets (Established in 1942)
- Australian Army Cadets (Founded in 1871 by School Headmaster Albert Bythesea Weigall, the Corps is one of the oldest military units in the nation, even predating the Australian Army.)
- Chess Club
- Duke of Edinburgh Award Scheme
- Debating

A number of boys also assist in editing the school's yearly almanac, The Sydneian, over 400 editions of which have been produced since 1875.

== Notable alumni ==
Old Sydneians' Union Logo

Alumnus of Sydney Grammar School are commonly referred to as Old Boys or Old Sydneians, and may elect to join the schools alumni association, the Old Sydneians' Union (OSU).

Sydney Grammar School is notable for having educated the most Australian Prime Ministers (tied wth Melbourne Grammar School) and the most High Court judges (Australia's highest court) out of any school in Australia, along with over 30 Rhodes Scholars. Its alumni also include influential figures in science, business, international sport, and the arts, like Graeme Segal (mathematician and Chern Medal recipient 2026), David Gonski (leading Australian philanthropist) and Rowan Gillies (former international president of Médecins Sans Frontières).

Notable alumni also include Sir Edmund Barton, the first Prime Minister of Australia (1901–1903), Sir William McMahon, 20th Prime Minister of Australia (1971–1972), Malcolm Turnbull, 29th Prime Minister of Australia (2015–2018), Sir Anthony Mason, 9th Chief Justice of the High Court of Australia (1987–1995), Bruce Gyngell, first person to appear on Australian television, Andrew "Boy" Charlton, an Olympic gold medallist swimmer, and also Banjo Paterson – bush poet and balladist, and author of "The Man From Snowy River" and "Waltzing Matilda," and who now has the school library named after him.
