= Albert Bythesea Weigall =

Australian educator (1840–1912)

Albert Bythesea Weigall CMG, (16 February 1840 – 20 February 1912) was an English-born Australian schoolmaster, headmaster of Sydney Grammar School for 45 years.

== Early life ==
Weigall was the fourth son of the Rev. Edward Weigall by his wife, Cecelia Bythesea Brome and was educated at Macclesfield Grammar School and Brasenose College, Oxford. He received second class honours in Literae Humaniores in 1862, and the following year travelled to Australia after a sea voyage was recommended for him to recover from illness.

== Career ==
Weigall settled in Melbourne, teaching primarily classics at Scotch College, Melbourne under Alexander Morrison for three years.

At the beginning of the 1867 academic year there were only 53 boys at Sydney Grammar; this grew to 696 boys in Weigall's last year as headmaster. Indeed, when he arrived the school was in a particularly perilous situation, as the previous headmaster William Stephens departed after a conflict over corporal punishment with the school trustees. He had left to form a new school at Darlinghurst, taking fifty students with him.

Weigall sought to rebuild the school by instilling the value of academic achievement, as well as build character through sporting activities. He introduced the school magazine The Sydneian, and a prefect system in 1878. Weigall guided the school's teachers, some of whom had arrived from England after being educated at the great public schools there, to impart a similar atmosphere at Sydney Grammar School. For example, he and Henry Anderson formed the school cadet corps in 1870, and the following year Weigall became captain of the corps.

== Late life and legacy ==
Weigall's interest almost exclusively lay with his role as Headmaster of Sydney Grammar School. He finally took a year off in 1893, and although he later returned and would remain headmaster until his death, he was plagued by illness in the latter part of his life. He died on 20 February 1912. He was lauded by past students and the school trustees for his leadership. The land the school had purchased in 1907 at Rushcutters Bay was named the Weigall Playing Fields; Weigall had advocated for sporting grounds for the students of the school.

He was married to Ada Frances Raymond in 1868, and they had four sons and four daughters.
