= J. T. Vallance =

Australian scholar and library administrator (born 1958)

John Taber Vallance AM
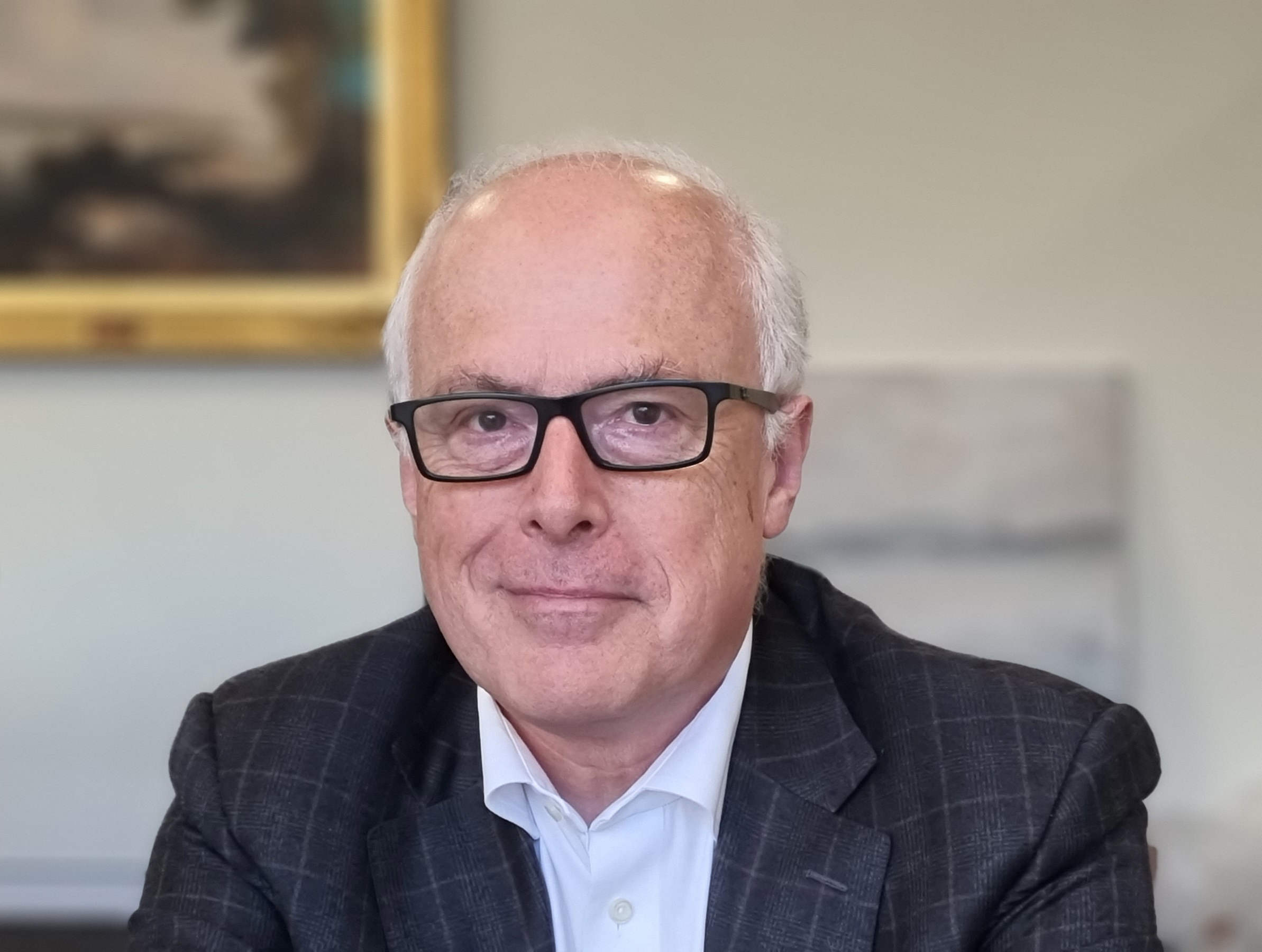
- John Vallance, 2022
- Born: 20 June 1958; Sydney, Australia
- Education: University of Sydney, St John's College, Cambridge
- Occupations: Scholar, artist, library and school administrator.
- Known for: Headmaster of Sydney Grammar School, State Librarian and Chief Executive State Library of New South Wales
- Notable work: The Lost Theory of Asclepiades of Bithynia
- Parent(s): Hilary Brinton Krone & Thomas George Vallance

John Taber Vallance AM (born 20 June 1958) is an Australian classical scholar and school and library administrator. He was appointed to the position of State Librarian and Chief Executive at the State Library of New South Wales in 2017. He was Headmaster of Sydney Grammar School from 1999 to 2017.

== Life ==
Vallance is the son of the Australian geologist Thomas George Vallance, and his mother was Hilary Brinton Krone. He was born and grew up in Sydney and from his early years was interested in chemistry and electronics. Music was an early passion, his first paid work was playing harpsichord for classical music groups in Sydney.

After graduating from the University of Sydney, Vallance studied at the University of Cambridge, England where he was awarded the Jebb Scholarship (1980), the Craven Scholarship and Studentship (1982). He also received the Brian Runnett Prize in Music from St John's College, Cambridge (1981). Vallance started studying life-drawing while living in Cambridge and on returning to Sydney produced his own sculptural pieces based on his life drawing work. The National Art School's annual Dr John Vallance Prize for Sculpture is named for him. In 1985 he married Catherine du Peloux Menage and they have two children. Vallance is a tractor collector.

== Teaching career ==
Vallance was made a Fellow at Gonville and Caius College, Cambridge in 1986, and taught at the Faculty of Classics, University of Cambridge. He authored works on ancient philosophy, science and medicine, and has contributed entries for the Oxford Classical Dictionary and the Enciclopedia Italiana. In 1990 he published The Lost Theory of Asclepiades of Bithynia and Marshall Clagett’s Greek Science in Antiquity - Thirty-Five Years Later.

From 1994 to 1999 he was Head of Classics at Sydney Grammar School. In 1999 he was appointed Headmaster of Sydney Grammar School, a position he held until 2017. On his retirement a collaborative portrait titled 'Goodbye, Sir!' was created by 301 boys from the school's Edgecliff Preparatory campus. The portrait consisting of 11,000 blocks was selected as a finalist work in the 2017 Archibald Prize.

== State Library of New South Wales ==
Vallance served as a member of the Library Council of NSW between 2008 and 2016 and as a Trustee of the State Library Foundation. He was a non-executive director of the National Art School between 2013 and 2017, and joined the board of the Sydney Symphony Orchestra in 2016. In 2017 he was appointed State Librarian and Chief Executive of the State Library of New South Wales.

Vallance was appointed a Member of the Order of Australia in the 2024 Australia Day Honours for his "significant service to education, to library services and programs, and to the arts".

== Works ==
- Vallance, J. T (1990), The Lost Theory of Asclepiades of Bithynia, Clarendon Press; New York : Oxford University Press
- Vallance, J. T (1990), "Marshall Clagett's Greek Science in Antiquity: Thirty-Five Years Later", Isis, 81 (4), Isis, vol. 81, no. 4: 713–721, doi:10.1086/355549, JSTOR 233815, S2CID 144273566
