= Elizabeth Stone (educator) =

Australian educator

- Occupation: Teacher
- Known for: Headmaster of Winchester College

Elizabeth Stone is an Australian teacher who is the current Headmaster of Winchester College, an English public school (a fee-charging private boarding school), and was formerly the head of Queenwood School for Girls, Sydney, Australia.

== Career ==
Stone was educated at Ascham School, and then trained in mathematics, German and law at the University of New South Wales. She moved to Oxford as a Rhodes scholar at University College, Oxford. She then worked at the Supreme Court of New South Wales and the University of New South Wales before returning to secondary education.

Stone taught maths at Barker College near Sydney, then held the senior position of "under master" at Winchester College from 2008 to 2011. From 2012 to 2014 she was vice-principal of Cheltenham Ladies College. Then, after 8 years as the principal of Queenwood School, she returned to Winchester College as Headmaster, succeeding Timothy Hands. She is the first woman to hold this position.

Stone sits on the board of the Ramsay Centre for Western Civilisation.

Academic offices
Preceded by Timothy Hands	Headmaster of Winchester College; 2023–present	Incumbent
