= Elizabeth Stone (19th-century writer) =

19th-century writer

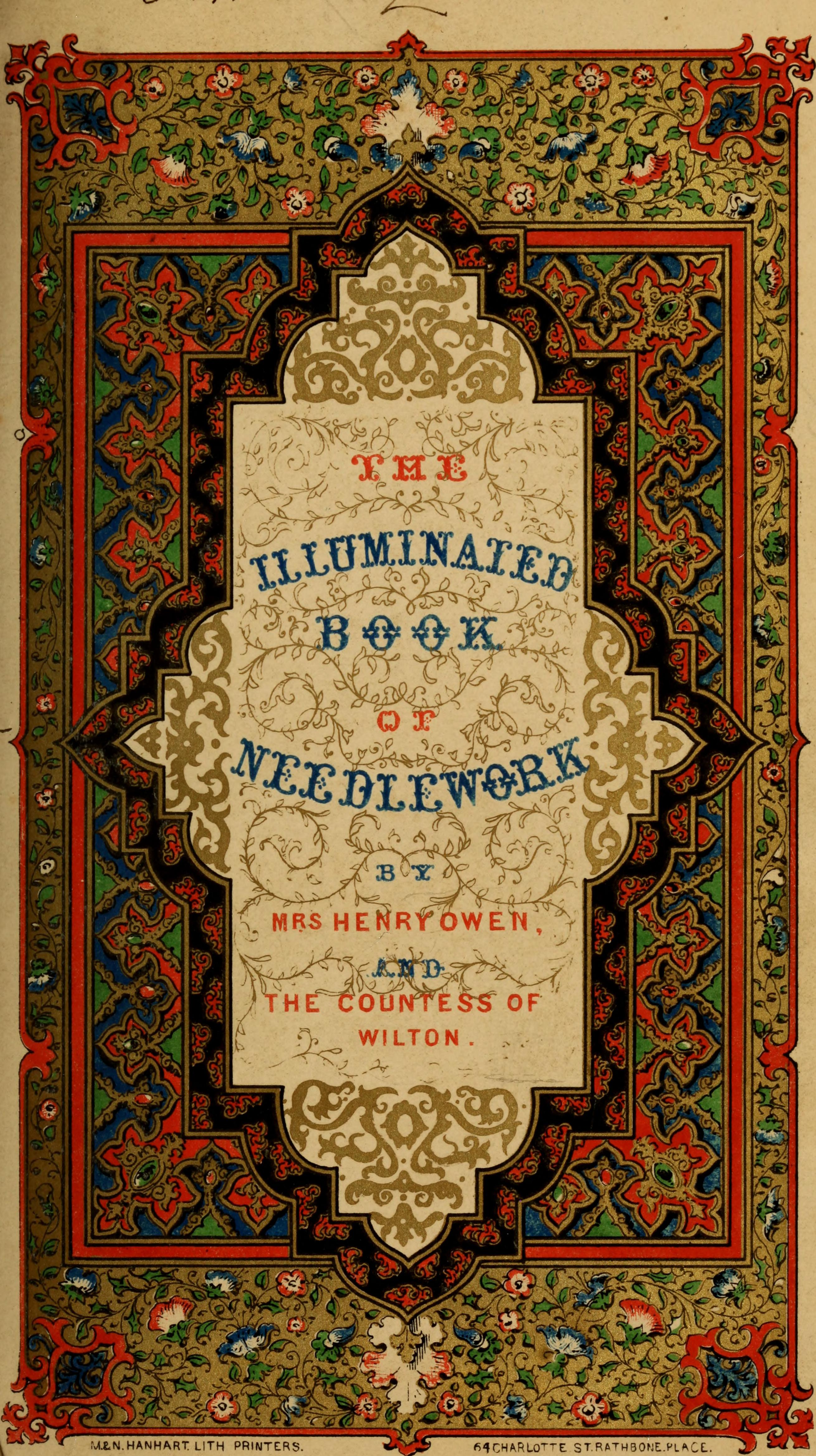
Stone's The Art of Needlework misattributed to Countess Wilton

Elizabeth Stone (April 1803 – August 1881) was an English writer of social history and social protest novels.

She was born Elizabeth Wheeler into a publishing family in Manchester in 1803. Her father John Wheeler and grandfather Charles Wheeler were publishers of the Manchester Chronicle since its inception in 1781. She had four brothers: Charles Henry, a printer and bookseller; John, founder of the Hampshire Independent newspaper; James, publisher of Manchester: Its Political, Social and Commercial History and of a Manchester poetry anthology; and Thomas, a lawyer and judge. Her mother was Mary Wheeler née Serjeant and she had two sisters.

In 1834, she married Revd Thomas Stone, who was a theological lecturer at St Bees College, Cumberland, and later curate of Felsted, Essex and Examiner in Hebrew at the University of London.

== Social history writing ==
In 1840, Stone strenuously researched and published The Art of Needlework, in which she criticised history that prioritised male achievements ("In all ages women may lament the ungallant silence of the historian"). She argued for a greater valuing of women’s cumulative contributions, saying:

It is not the independent intrinsic worth of each isolated action of woman which stamps its value — it is their bearing and effect on the mass. It is the daily and hourly accumulation of minute particles which form the vast amount.

Ledbetter and Wortley call it "the first book to record and validate women’s needlework as art," highlighting the synonymity of needlework with women’s work in the Victorian era. Stone followed it in 1845 with The Chronicles of Fashion, a work on historical fashion since the reign of Elizabeth I in two volumes.

The Art of Needlework was re-issued by Henry Colburn in 1847, who misattributed its authorship to Mary Egerton, Countess of Wilton.

== Social reform novels ==
Stone’s first novel was William Langshawe, the Cotton Lord (1842). This has been described as a "Condition of England" novel and critiques working conditions in the Manchester cotton industry. Bodenheimer calls the narrative "a symptom... of the social self-consciousness generated by the critique of industrialism".

Stone supported her fiction with references to parliamentary reports into working conditions, making first-person addresses to the reader to assure them of the accuracy of her work. She used similar first-person addresses in her second novel, The Young Milliner, which contributed to "establish[ing] the seamstress as a figure of hardship and suffering" in Victorian literature.

These social justice novels have received the most attention of Stone’s fictional work, and have been suggested as an influence on Elizabeth Gaskell. The similarity between the two writers was noted by contemporaries, and Gaskell was aware of it.

== Later life ==
Stone's husband died in 1850. In the preface to her book God’s Acre in 1858, Stone mentioned that she was going blind, but continued to write. In 1871, she was living with her sister Mary in lodgings in Worthing, Sussex. Both sisters died in 1881.

The British Museum library catalogue incorrectly attributed the works of Sutherland Menzies to Stone, and the assumption that this was her pen name persisted, despite work showing that it was a mistake in Studia Anglistica Upsaliensia (1963), by Michael Wheeler (1989), and Alexis Easley (2012).

== Works ==
=== Non-fiction ===
- The Art of Needlework (1840)
- Chronicles of Fashion (2 vols., 1845)
- God's Acre, or, Historical Notices Relating to Churchyards (1858)
- Angels (1859)
- A Handbook to the Christian Year, for Young People (1860)

=== Novels ===
- William Langshawe, the Cotton Lord (1842)
- The Young Milliner (1843)
- Miss Pen and her Niece, or, The Old Maid and the Young One (1843)
- Mr Dalton's Legatee (1850)
- Ellen Merton, or, The Pic-Nic (1856)

=== Poetry ===
- Three Incidents, Strictly True (1873)
