= Head of the River (New South Wales) =

Group of Australian rowing competitions

The Head of the River rowing regatta refers to two New South Wales school rowing competitions, one for boys and one for girls.

== AAGPS Head of the River Regatta ==
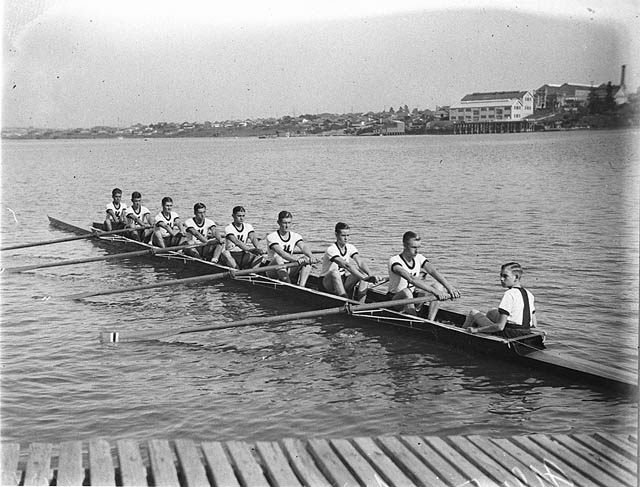
Newington's eight-oar crew, 1932

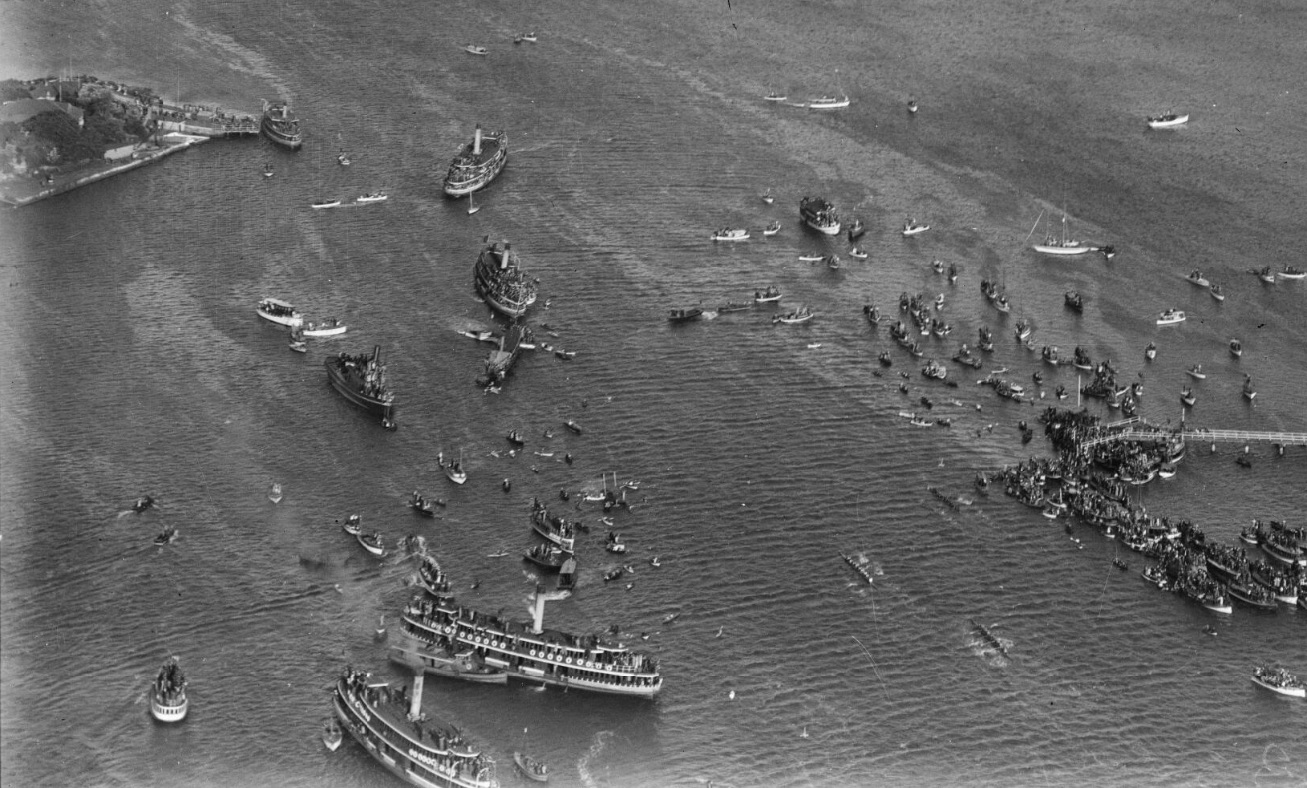
Aerial view of the Head of the River, circa 1930s

The AAGPS Head of the River Regatta takes place in Penrith, New South Wales, Australia every March at the Sydney International Regatta Centre (SIRC). It is the culmination of the GPS (Great Public Schools) rowing season for senior crews.

From 1893 until 1935, the Regatta was held on the Parramatta River in Port Jackson – in early years from Putney to Gladesville and in later years from the Yaralla Estate at Concord to Cabarita. From 1936 until 1996 it was raced on the Nepean River and finished near the Nepean Bridge. Since 1996 it's been held on the Sydney Olympic course at Penrith. From 1893 until 1909 the blue-riband race was contested by four-oared boats, and since then by eight-oared boats with coxed fours contesting the minor events. By the 1930s when the eight Sydney GPS schools were competing in the event on the Parramatta River, two heats of four lanes were raced and then a final was contested by the top four. Since 1996 the 1st and 2nd VIIIs race over 2000 metres. Previous events had the eights race over a mile and a half (except in 1946 and 1947 – a mile and a quarter) and fours racing over a mile. Up until the 1930s there was limited school participation in the regattas of the Sydney club rowing season and for many of the school squads the Head of the River was the sole and highlight race of their rowing season. In those days, the race was of great public interest. The regatta drew a huge flotilla of chartered ferries and vessels which would moor off Putney, Tennyson Point and Cabarita.

As of 2021, all nine of the GPS schools, Sydney Grammar School, The King's School, Newington College, Sydney Boys High School, The Scots College, St. Joseph's College, Saint Ignatius' College, The Armidale School and Shore School, send their eights to the Head of the River. Prior to 2021, The Armidale School did not send their eight to the regatta. In 2012 The Armidale School started sending fours, and the first IV race of 2013 was historic as the first time crews from all nine GPS schools competed. One of the most successful coaches of rowing among the schools was Robert Buntine at King's and Newington from 1966 until 1996.

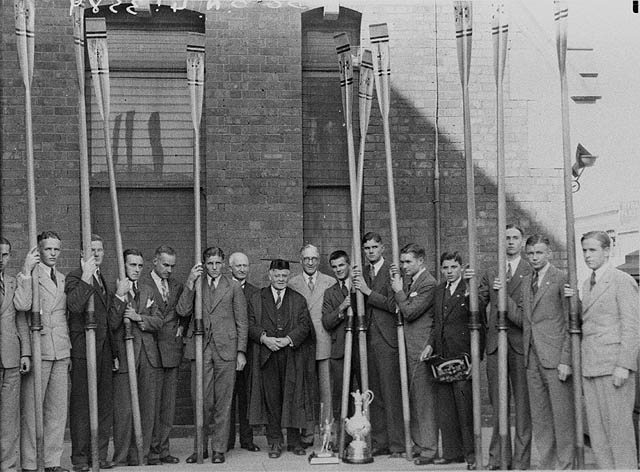
1934 victorious 1st VIII crew from Sydney Grammar

It is the last race of the official GPS rowing season, and usually follows the Riverview Gold Cup held on the Lane Cove River. The Head of the River is one week after other summer sports premierships – cricket and basketball – have finished. This enables over ten thousand school students and other supporters to attend. The 129th AAGPS Head of the River was held at SIRC on the 21st of March 2026.

The current (SIRC) record time (and former junior world record until 2001) for the 1st VIII is 5:42.6 set by Newington on 23 March 1996, in the first year that the race was held at SIRC. The most recent winner of the AAGPS Head of the River, and holder of the Major Rennie Trophy is The Shore School, winning the regatta in 2026 with a time of 5:53.36 ahead of Saint Ignatius' College, Riverview (5:53.40) and St Joseph's College (5:59.25).

== NSW Schoolgirls Head of The River ==
The NSW Schoolgirls Head of the River was first raced in 1991. The inaugural Schoolgirls Head of the River Regatta took place on Middle Harbour Creek at Davidson Park, Roseville. In following years the event was held at Iron Cove.

The NSW Schoolgirls' Head of the River was held at the Sydney International Regatta Centre (SIRC), in Penrith on the Sunday following the Schoolboys Head of the River. It is organised by the NSW Combined Independent Schools Sports Council (NSWCISSC), culminating of the Schoolgirls' rowing season.

The current (SIRC) record time for the 1st VIII in the Schoolgirl Head of the River is 6:38.08 set by St Catherine's School on 18 March 2023. The most recent winner of the NSW Schoolgirl Head of the River is Pymble Ladies' College.

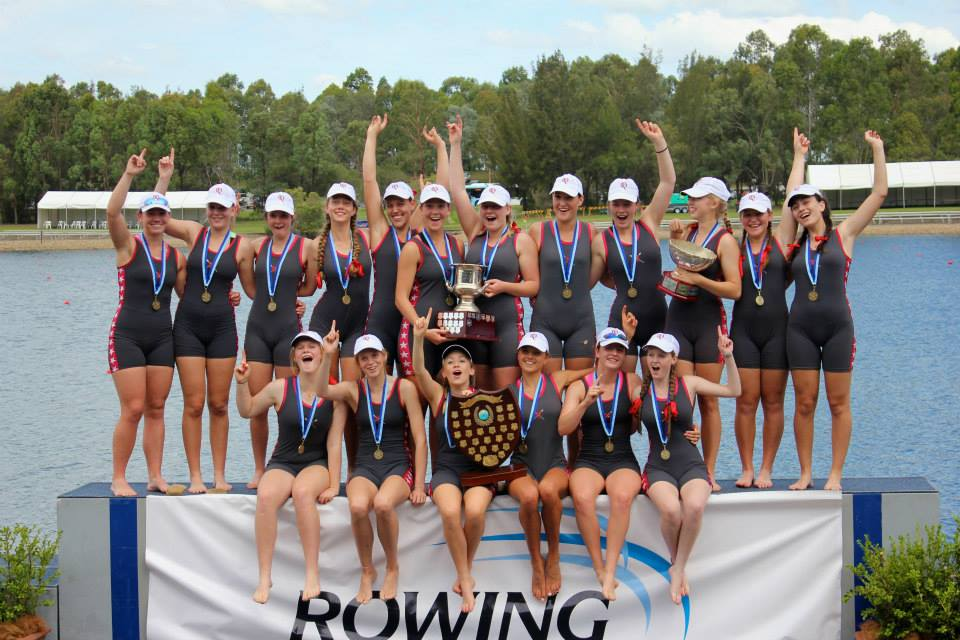
Queenwood's 1st VIII and 2nd VIII celebrate their wins on the podium, 2014

Unlike the boys' race, all affiliated schools of the NSWCISSC, NSW Combined High Schools Sports Association (NSWCHSSA), and the NSW Combined Catholic Colleges Sports Association (NSWCCCSA), are eligible to nominate their students to compete in the girls' regatta. As of 2008, ten of the thirty AHIGS schools, those being Ascham School, Canberra Girls' Grammar School, Loreto Kirribilli, Loreto Normanhurst, MLC School, Presbyterian Ladies College, Sydney, Pymble Ladies' College, Queenwood School for Girls, Roseville College, and Tara Anglican School for Girls, send their crews to the Head of the River, making up the bulk of entries. The regatta is becoming increasingly popular among girls crews from public and private non-AHIGS schools, most notably, St Paul's Grammar School, Kinross Wolaroi School, Sydney Girls High School, SCECGS Redlands, North Sydney Girls High School, Riverside Girls High School and Radford College.

The New South Wales Rowing Association (NSWRA) holds ten perpetual trophies in trust for competition at the Schoolgirls regatta:

1. the NSW Union of Ex-Oarswomen Rose Evans trophy for competition between schoolgirl first eights.
2. the University of Sydney Women's Sports Association trophy for competition between schoolgirl first coxed fours – now awarded to the schoolgirl second eight.
3. the Union of Boat Race Officials shield for competition between schoolgirl Senior coxed quadruple sculls.
4. the University of NSW Trophy for competition between schoolgirl open fours (not awarded in 2007 due to a change in program format).
5. the NSW Union of Oarswomen Golden Scull Trophy for competition between single scullers.
6. the Margaret Varady Trophy for competition between schoolgirl year 10 coxed quads.
7. the Betty Deer Rosebowl for the highest aggregate point score between competing schools.
8. the William McKeith Trophy for the Junior handicap point score.
9. the Carol Bowern Shield for the Senior handicap point score.
10. the Janet Freeman Trophy for the Year 8 Coxed Quad Scull.

== AAGPS Head of the River Regatta winners ==
Since 2009 the regatta consists of eleven races.

=== 1893 to 1999 ===
Results
Year	1st VIII	2nd VIII	1st IV	2nd IV
1893	Shore	–	Shore	–
1894	Grammar	–	Shore	–
1895	Shore	–	Shore	–
1896	Shore	–	Shore	–
1897	Shore	–	Shore	–
1898	Shore	–	Shore	–
1899	St Ignatius'	–	St Ignatius'	–
1900	Shore	–	Shore	–
1901	St Ignatius'	–	St Ignatius'	–
1902	Grammar	–	Grammar	–
1903	Grammar	–	Grammar	–
1904	Grammar	–	Grammar	–
1905	St Ignatius'	–	St Ignatius'	–
1906	Shore	–	Shore	St Ignatius'
1907	St Ignatius'	–	St Ignatius'	–
1908	Shore	–	Shore	St Ignatius'
1909	Grammar	–	Grammar	–
1910	Shore	–	Grammar	–
1911	St Joseph's	–	St Ignatius'	–
1912	Grammar	–	Grammar	–
1913	Shore	–	St Ignatius'	–
1914	Shore	–	Shore	–
1915	Shore	–	St Joseph's	–
1916	St Joseph's	–	Grammar	–
1917	Grammar	–	Grammar	–
1918	Grammar	–	St Joseph's	Grammar
1919	Grammar	–	St Ignatius'	Grammar
1920	King's	–	St Ignatius'	St Joseph's
1921	Newington	–	King's	St Joseph's
1922	Grammar	–	King's	Shore
1923	Grammar	–	Shore	St Joseph's
1924	Grammar	–	High	Shore
1925	High	–	Newington	High
1926	High	–	King's	King's
1927	High	–	Newington	Shore
1928	Shore	–	Shore	Shore
1929	High	–	High	St Ignatius'
1930	Declared No Race	–	St Joseph's	St Joseph's
1931	Shore	–	High	St Joseph's
1932	St Joseph's	–	St Joseph's	High
1933	St Joseph's	–	High	Scots
1934	Grammar	–	Grammar	Shore
1935	Shore	–	St Joseph's	St Joseph's
1936	St Joseph's	–	St Joseph's	Shore
1937	Shore	–	Shore	Shore
1938	Shore	–	High	St Joseph's
1939	Shore	–	High	High
1946	Scots	–	Scots	Shore
1947	Newington	–	King's	High
1948	High	–	High	High
1949	Shore	–	High	High
1950	Shore	–	Shore	High
1951	Shore	–	Newington	Shore
1952	Shore	–	Shore	Shore
1953	High	–	High	Shore
1954	Shore	–	Shore	St Joseph's
1955	Grammar	–	St Joseph's	St Joseph's
1956	St Joseph's	–	Shore	High
1957	High	–	Newington	High
1958	St Ignatius'	–	High	High
1959	High	–	Shore	Grammar
1960	Shore	–	High	St Joseph's
1961	Shore	–	King's	Scots
1962	Scots	–	King's	Grammar
1963	Newington	–	Grammar	High
1964	St Ignatius'	St Ignatius'	St Ignatius'	Newington
1965	Scots	–	St Ignatius'	Grammar
1966	Newington	–	St Joseph's	King's
1967	King's	–	Newington	Grammar
1968	King's	Newington	King's	Shore
1969	King's	Grammar	King's	Shore
1970	King's	Grammar	King's	Newington
1971	St Joseph's	King's	Scots	Shore
1972	King's	Newington	St Joseph's	King's
1973	St Joseph's	St Joseph's	King's	King's
1974	St Ignatius'	St Ignatius'	King's	King's
1975	St Ignatius'	King's	King's	King's
1976	Newington	St Ignatius'	High	King's
1977	Newington	Shore	Shore	Shore
1978	Grammar	Grammar	Scots	Scots
1979	Scots	Shore	Shore	Shore
1980	King's	St Ignatius'	Shore	Shore
1981	King's	Shore	King's	Shore
1982	King's	King's	Newington	Grammar
1983	King's	St Joseph's	King's	King's
1984	King's	Shore	Shore	Shore
1985	Shore	Shore	Shore	Shore
1986	Shore	King's	Shore	Scots
1987	Newington	Newington	Shore	Shore
1988	Shore	Newington	Shore	Shore
1989	Newington	Newington	Shore	Shore
1990	Newington	King's	St Joseph's	St Ignatius'
1991	Newington	St Joseph's	Shore	Shore
1992	Newington	Newington	St Joseph's	St Joseph's
1993	King's	Newington	Shore	Newington
1994	Newington	St Ignatius'	Shore	St Joseph's
1995	Shore	Shore	Shore	King's
1996	Shore	Newington	Shore	Shore
1997	Newington	Shore	St Joseph's	Shore
1998	Newington	Shore	Shore	Shore
1999	Shore	Shore	Shore	Shore

==== The 1st VIII – Major Rennie Trophy ====
Results of the 1st VIII
Year	Winner	2nd	3rd
1893	Shore	Grammar	
1894	Grammar	Shore	
1895	Shore	Grammar	
1896	Shore	Grammar	
1897	Shore	Grammar	
1898	Shore	Grammar	St Ignatius'
1899	St Ignatius'	Grammar	Shore
1900	Shore	Grammar	
1901	St Ignatius'	Grammar	Shore
1902	Grammar	St Ignatius'	Shore
1903	Grammar	Shore	St Ignatius'
1904	Grammar	St Ignatius'	Shore
1905	St Ignatius'	Grammar	Shore
1906	Shore	St Ignatius'	Grammar
1907	St Ignatius'	Grammar	Shore
1908	Shore	Grammar	St Ignatius'
1909	Grammar	Shore	St Joseph's
1910	Shore	St Joseph's	Grammar
1911	St Joseph's	Shore	Grammar
1912	Grammar	Shore	St Joseph's
1913	Shore	St Ignatius'	St Joseph's
1914	Shore	St Joseph's	St Ignatius'
1915	Shore	St Joseph's	Grammar
1916	St Joseph's	Grammar	Shore
1917	Grammar	St Ignatius'	St Joseph's
1918	Grammar	Shore	St Joseph's
1919	Grammar	St Ignatius'	Shore
1920	King's	Grammar	Shore
1921	Newington	King's	Grammar
1922	Grammar	Shore	St Joseph's
1923	Grammar	Shore	St Joseph's
1924	Grammar	Shore	St Joseph's
1925	High	Shore	Grammar
1926	High	St Joseph's	Shore
1927	High	Grammar	King's
1928	Shore	Grammar	High
1929	Shore	St Ignatius'	St Joseph's
1930	No Race	No Race	No Race
1931	Shore	High	St Joseph's
1932	St Joseph's	Shore	Grammar
1933	St Joseph's	Shore	Grammar
1934	Shore	Grammar	High
1935	Shore	Grammar	St Joseph's
1936	St Joseph's	Grammar	Shore
1937	Shore	Scots	Grammar
1938	Shore	High	Newington
1939	Shore	High	Scots
1946	Scots	King's	St Joseph's
1947	Newington	High	King's
1948	High	Newington	Shore
1949	Shore	High	Newington
1950	Shore	Scots	King's
1951	Shore	St Joseph's	King's
1952	Shore	Grammar	Newington
1953	High	Shore	St Joseph's
1954	Shore	Newington	King's
1955	Grammar	St Joseph's	Shore
1956	St Joseph's	King's	Shore
1957	High	Grammar	Shore
1958	St Ignatius'	Shore	High
1959	High	St Joseph's	Shore
1960	Shore	Scots	High
1961	Shore	St Ignatius'	King's
1962	Scots	Newington	Grammar
1963	Newington	St Joseph's	King's
1964	St Ignatius'	Newington	Shore
1965	Scots	St Ignatius'	Grammar
1966	Newington	Scots	Shore
1967	King's	Newington	Grammar
1968	King's	St Ignatius'	St Joseph's
1969	King's	Newington	Grammar
1970	King's	Shore	St Joseph's
1971	St Joseph's	Scots	King's
1972	King's	St Joseph's	St Ignatius'
1973	St Joseph's	Grammar	King's
1974	St Ignatius'	Grammar	Newington
1975	St Ignatius'	King's	St Joseph's
1976	Newington	St Ignatius'	King's
1977	Newington	Shore	Scots
1978	Grammar	Newington	St Joseph's
1979	Scots	Newington	Grammar
1980	King's	Newington	St Joseph's
1981	King's	Newington	Grammar
1982	King's	Grammar	Shore
1983	King's	Shore	St Joseph's
1984	King's	Shore	Newington
1985	Shore	Newington	King's
1986	Shore	Newington	St Joseph's
1987	Newington	St Joseph's	Shore
1988	Shore	Newington	St Joseph's
1989	Newington	King's	Shore
1990	Newington	St Ignatius'	Shore
1991	Newington	Scots	King's
1992	Newington	St Joseph's	King's
1993	King's	Newington	St Joseph's
1994	Newington	Grammar	King's
1995	Shore	Newington	King's
1996	Shore	Newington	Grammar
1997	Newington	King's	St Joseph's
1998	Newington	Shore	St Joseph's
1999	Shore	St Joseph's	Newington
2000	Shore	St Ignatius'	St Joseph's
2001	King's	Grammar	St Ignatius'
2002	King's	St Ignatius'	St Joseph's
2003	Shore	St Ignatius'	King's
2004	Shore	St Joseph's	King's
2005	Shore	St Joseph's	King's
2006	King's	St Joseph's	St Ignatius'
2007	King's	St Ignatius'	Grammar
2008	Shore	Newington	St Joseph's
2009	Shore	Scots	St Ignatius'
2010	Shore	Grammar	Newington
2011	Grammar	Shore	Newington
2012	Shore	Scots	Newington Grammar
2013	Shore	St Joseph's	King's
2014	Shore	St Joseph's	Scots
2015	St Joseph's	Scots	Shore
2016	Shore	St Ignatius'	St Joseph's
2017	Shore	St Ignatius'	Kings
2018	St Ignatius'	Shore	St Joseph's
2019	Shore	King's	St Joseph's
2020	Scots	King's	St Ignatius'
2021	King's	Shore	Scots
2022	King's	Shore	St Ignatius'
2023	St Ignatius'	King's	Scots
2024	St Joseph's	Shore	King's
2025	St Ignatius'	Shore	King's
2026	Shore	St Ignatius'	St Joseph's

The current (SIRC) record time for the 1st VIII is 5:42.06 set by the Shore School (Joe Marsh, Evan Sturrock, Nick White, Nick Smith, Michael Irvine, Alex Koch, Andrew Waite, Aaron Marshall-McCormack coxed by Carter Mullins) on 23 March 1996.
Below lists the most successful schools in the 1st VIII event (wins):

1. Shore School (45)
2. The King's School (18)
3. Sydney Grammar School (16)
4. Newington College (14)
5. Saint Ignatius' College (11)
6. St Joseph's College (10)
7. Sydney Boys High School (8)
8. The Scots College (5)
9. The Armidale School (0)

==== The 2nd VIII – L C Robson Memorial Trophy ====
Results of the 2nd VIII
Year	Winner	2nd	3rd
1968	Newington	King's	St Ignatius'
1969	Grammar	King's	Newington
1970	Grammar	Shore	Scots
1971	King's	Grammar	St Ignatius'
1972	Newington	Grammar	St Joseph's
1973	St Joseph's	Shore	St Ignatius'
1974	St Ignatius'	King's	Shore
1975	King's	St Joseph's	St Ignatius'
1976	St Ignatius'	St Joseph's	King's
1977	Shore	Scots	King's
1978	Grammar	St Ignatius'	St Joseph's
1979	Shore	Grammar	Scots
1980	St Ignatius'	St Joseph's	King's
1981	Shore	Newington	King's
1982	King's	Shore	Grammar
1984	St Joseph's	St Ignatius'	King's
1984	Shore	King's	High
1985	Shore	St Joseph's	Newington
1986	King's	Newington	St Ignatius
1987	Newington	Scots	King's
1988	Newington	Shore	King's
1989	Newington	King's	Shore
1990	King's	Newington	St Ignatius'
1991	St Joseph's	King's	Newington
1992	Newington	St Joseph's	King's
1993	Newington	King's	Grammar
1994	St Ignatius'	King's	Newington
1995	Shore	King's	St Ignatius'
1996	Newington	Shore	Scots
1997	Shore	King's	St Joseph's
1998	Shore	Newington	King's
1999	Shore	King's	Newington
2000	Shore	King's	St Joseph's
2001	King's	Shore	Newington
2002	St Joseph's	St Ignatius'	Shore
2003	Shore	St Joseph's	St Ignatius'
2004	Shore	St Joseph's	King's
2005	Shore	St Joseph's	King's
2006	King's	St Joseph's	Shore
2007	Shore	St Joseph's	King's
2008	Shore	St Ignatius'	King's
2009	Shore	King's	Newington
2010	Shore	St Ignatius'	Scots
2011	Newington	St Ignatius'	Scots
2012	Shore	St Joseph's	Scots
2013	St Joseph's	Shore	Scots
2014	Shore	St Joseph's	Scots St Ignatius'
2015	Scots	Shore	Newington
2016	Shore	St Joseph's	St Ignatius'
2017	Shore	Scots	St Joseph's
2018	Shore	Scots	Newington
2019	Shore	King's	Newington
2020	St Ignatius'	Shore	Newington
2021	St Ignatius'	Newington	Shore
2022	Shore	St Ignatius'	Kings
2023	St Ignatius'	Kings	Newington
2024	King's	St Ignatius'	Newington
2025	Shore	St Ignatius'	King's
2026	Shore	St Joseph's	St Ignatius'

The current (SIRC) record time for the 2nd VIII is 5:57.73 set by The King's School (George White, Matt Carter, Hugh Caldwell, Will Onus, Caleb Bush, Ed Yorston, Harry Horwitz-Rourke, Mack Wilcox coxed by Oscar Bell) on 30 March 2001.

Below Lists the most successful schools in the 2nd VIII event (wins):

1. Shore School (26)
2. Newington College (9)
3. The King’s School (8)
4. St Ignatius’ College (7)
5. St Joseph’s College (5)
6. Sydney Grammar School (3)
7. The Scots College (1)
8. Sydney Boys High School (0)
9. The Armidale School (0)

==== The 1st IV – Yaralla Cup ====
Results
Year	Winner	2nd	3rd
2000	Shore	King's	St Ignatius'
2001	King's	St Ignatius'	Grammar
2002	King's	St Joseph's	St Ignatius'
2003	Shore	St Ignatius'	King's
2004	Shore	St Joseph's	St Ignatius'
2005	King's	St Joseph's	St Ignatius'
2006	King's	St Joseph's	Shore
2007	Shore	Newington	St Ignatius'
2008	Shore	King's	St Ignatius'
2009	Shore	St Ignatius'	St Joseph's
2010	Grammar	King's	Scots
2011	King's	Shore	Scots
2012	Scots	King's	Shore
2013	Shore	King's	Newington
2014	Shore	King's	Grammar
2015	St Joseph's	Shore	Scots
2016	Shore	Newington	St Ignatius'
2017	Shore	St Joseph's	Armidale
2018	Shore	St Ignatius'	King's
2019	St Ignatius'	Shore	Newington
2020	Shore	St Ignatius'	St Joseph's
2021	Shore	Newington	Scots
2022	Shore	St Ignatius'	Kings
2023	St Ignatius'	Shore	Kings
2024	St Ignatius'	Shore	Kings
2025	Shore	Newington	St Ignatius'
2026	St Ignatius'	Shore	Kings

The current (SIRC) record time for the 1st IV is 6:36.75 set by the Shore School (Austin Hamilton, Henry Faddy, Samuel Bowman, Toby Crowther coxed by Oscar Miller) on the 22nd of March 2025.

Below Lists the most successful schools in the 1st IV event (wins):

1. Shore School (49)
2. The King’s School (19)
3. St Ignatius’ College (14)
4. St Joseph’s College (13)
5. Sydney Boys High School (12)
6. Sydney Grammar School (11)
7. Newington College (6)
8. The Scots College (4)
9. The Armidale School (0)

==== The 2nd IV – Allan Callaway Trophy ====
Results
Year	Winner	2nd	3rd
2000	St Ignatius'	Shore	King's
2001	St Ignatius'	Shore	Grammar
2002	St Ignatius'	King's	Grammar
2003	St Ignatius'	King's	Shore
2004	Shore	St Ignatius'	St Joseph's
2005	Shore	St Ignatius'	St Joseph's
2006	King's	Shore	St Joseph's
2007	Shore	St Ignatius'	King's
2008	Shore	King's	St Ignatius'
2009	Shore	Scots	St Ignatius'
2010	Shore	Scots	St Ignatius'
2011	King's	Shore	Grammar
2012	King's	St Ignatius'	Scots
2013	Shore	St Joseph's	King's
2014	Shore	St Joseph's	King's
2015	St Joseph's	Shore	Newington
2016	Shore	King's	St Joseph's
2017	Shore	King's	Scots
2018	St Ignatius'	St Joseph's	Scots
2019	St Ignatius'	Shore	King's
2020	St Ignatius'	Shore	Grammar
2021	Shore	Scots	St Ignatius'
2022	Shore	Kings	St Ignatius'
2023	Kings	St Ignatius'	Shore
2024	St Ignatius'	King's	St Joseph's
2025	St Ignatius'	King's	St Joseph's
2026	Shore	St Joseph's	King's

The current (SIRC) record time for the 2nd IV is 6:43.25 set by the Shore School (Angus Davidson, Andrew Keatinge, James Anderson, Christopher Allison coxed by Charlie Thompson) on 27 March 2004.

Below Lists the most successful schools in the 2nd IV event (wins):

1. Shore School (39)
2. The King’s School (13)
3. Sydney Boys High School (12)
4. St Ignatius’ College (11)
5. St Joseph’s College (9)
6. Sydney Grammar School (6)
7. The Scots College (5)
8. Newington College (2)
9. The Armidale School (0)

==== The 3rd IV – Father Gartlan Trophy ====
Results
Year	Winner	2nd	3rd
2000	Shore	St Ignatius'	King's
2001	Shore	St Ignatius'	St Joseph's
2002	St Ignatius'	Shore	Grammar
2003	Shore	St Ignatius'	King's
2004	Shore	St Joseph's	St Ignatius'
2005	St Joseph's	King's	Shore
2006	St Ignatius'	Shore	King's
2007	Shore	King's	St Ignatius'
2008	Shore	King's	St Ignatius'
2009	King's	St Ignatius'	Scots
2010	King's	Grammar	Shore
2011	Scots	St Joseph's	Shore
2012	King's	St Ignatius'	Armidale
2013	King's	Scots	Shore
2014	Scots	St Ignatius'	Shore
2015	Shore	St Joseph's	King's
2016	Shore	St Ignatius'	St Joseph's
2017	Shore	St Ignatius'	King's
2018	St Joseph's	Scots	Shore
2019	Shore	St Ignatius'	St Joseph's
2020	St Ignatius'	Shore	Scots
2021	St Ignatius'	Shore	Scots
2022	St Ignatius'	Kings	Shore
2023	St Ignatius'	Kings	St Joseph’s
2024	King's	St Ignatius'	Shore
2025	St Ignatius'	Shore	St Joseph's
2025	St Ignatius'	Kings	Shore

The current (SIRC) record time for the 3rd IV is 6:48.54 set by St Ignatius’ College (Noah Coble, Matthew Beaman, Ben Eisenhauer, Boston Kirkby coxed by Jimmy Kelly) on 22 March 2025.

Below Lists the most successful schools in the 3rd IV event (wins):

1. Shore School (34)
2. The King’s School (13)
3. St Ignatius’ College (11)
4. St Joseph’s College (6)
5. The Scots College (5)
6. Newington College (5)
7. Sydney Boys High School (4)
8. Sydney Grammar School (3)
9. The Armidale School (0)

==== The 4th IV – Penrith City Council Cup ====
Results
Year	Winner	2nd	3rd
2000	Shore	St Ignatius'	King's
2001	St Joseph's	Shore	St Ignatius'
2002	St Ignatius'	Shore	Grammar
2003	St Ignatius'	Shore	King's
2004	Shore	St Ignatius'	St Joseph's
2005	St Ignatius'	King's	Shore
2006	Shore	King's	St Ignatius'
2007	Shore	King's	St Ignatius'
2008	Shore	St Ignatius'	King's 2
2009	King's	St Ignatius'	Shore
2010	King's	Shore	St Ignatius'
2011	King's	Shore	Scots
2012	King's	St Ignatius'	Grammar
2013	King's	Newington	Scots
2014	St Joseph's	St Ignatius'	Scots
2015	Shore	St Joseph's	St Ignatius'
2016	Shore	St Joseph's	St Ignatius'
2017	King's	Newington	Shore
2018	St Ignatius'	St Joseph's	Scots
2019	Shore	St Ignatius'	St Joseph's
2020	Shore	St Ignatius'	Scots
2021	Shore	St Ignatius'	St Joseph's
2022	St Ignatius'	Kings	Shore
2023	St Ignatius'	Kings	St Joseph’s
2024	Shore	St Ignatius'	King's
2025	Shore	St Ignatius'	St Joseph’s
2026	St Ignatius'	Shore	St Joseph’s

The current (SIRC) record time for the 4th IV is 6:51.35 set by the Shore School (Will Bailey, Harry Faulkner, Alex Rogan, Liam Kennedy coxed by Alex Gulbin) on the 22nd of March 2025.

Below Lists the most successful schools in the 4th IV event (wins):

1. Shore School (32)
2. The King’s School (14)
3. St Joseph’s College (12)
4. St Ignatius’ College (11)
5. Sydney Grammar School (4)
6. The Scots College (3)
7. Sydney Boys High School (3)
8. Newington College (2)
9. The Armidale School (0)

==== The 3rd VIII ====
Results
Year	Winner	2nd	3rd
2001	Shore	St Ignatius'	St Joseph's
2002	St Joseph's	Shore	St Ignatius'
2003	St Ignatius'	Shore	St Joseph's
2004	Shore	St Ignatius'	St Joseph's
2005	St Joseph's	King's	St Ignatius'
2006	King's	St Joseph's 1	St Joseph's 2
2007	Shore	St Ignatius'	King's
2008	St Ignatius'	Shore	–
2009	King's	St Joseph's	Grammar
2010	King's	Scots	Grammar
2011	King's	Scots	St Ignatius'
2012	King's 1	St Ignatius'	King's 2
2013	King's 1	St Joseph's	Newington
2014	St Joseph's	Shore	Scots
2015	St Joseph's	Shore	King's
2016	Shore	St Joseph's	St Ignatius' 1
2017	Grammar	Newington	St Joseph's
2018	St Joseph's 1	St Ignatius'	St Joseph's 2
2019	Shore	St Ignatius' 1	St Joseph's
2020			
2021	St Joseph's	Shore	St Ignatius'
2022	King’s	St Ignatius'	Shore
2023	Grammar	St Ignatius' 1	St Ignatius’ 2
2024	St Ignatius' 1	Shore	St Joseph's
2025	Shore	St Ignatius' 1	St Joseph's
2026	St Ignatius' 1	Shore	St Ignatius’ 2

The current (SIRC) record time for the 3rd VIII is 6:17.97 set by the Shore School on 27 March 2004.

In 2001, the following four races were added to the regatta. These are held before the IVs and the 2nd and 1st VIII race.

==== The 1st Year 10 VIII ====
Results
Year	Winner	2nd	3rd
2001	Newington	Grammar	St Ignatius'
2002	Shore	St Joseph's	Scots
2003	Shore	King's	St Joseph's
2004	King's	Grammar	Shore
2005	King's	Shore	St Ignatius'
2006	Shore	King's	Newington
2007	St Joseph's	King's	Shore
2008	Shore	Grammar	St Ignatius'
2009	Grammar	Shore	King's
2010	Newington	St Joseph's	Scots
2011	King's	Newington	St Ignatius'
2012	Shore	Newington	St Joseph's
2013	Shore	Grammar	King's
2014	King's	Shore	St Ignatius'
2015	Shore	St Joseph's	King's
2016	Shore	King's	Scots
2017	King's	St Ignatius'	Scots
2018	King's	Shore	Scots
2019	Shore	Grammar	Scots
2020			
2021	St Ignatius'	King's	Shore
2022	King's	St Ignatius'	Shore
2023	King's	St Ignatius'	Newington
2024	King's	Shore	St Joseph's
2025	St Ignatius'	King's	St Joseph's
2026	St Ignatius'	Scots	St Joseph's

The current (SIRC) record time for the 1st Year 10 VIII is 6:08.67 set by St Ignatius College on 13 March 2021.

==== The 2nd Year 10 VIII ====
Results
Year	Winner	2nd	3rd
2001	Shore	Grammar	St Ignatius'
2002	Shore	St Ignatius'	St Joseph's
2003	Shore	High	King's
2004	Grammar	Shore	King's
2005	Shore	King's	St Joseph's
2006	Shore	King's	St Joseph's
2007	King's	Shore	St Ignatius'
2008	Grammar	Shore	King's
2009	King's	Scots	St Ignatius'
2010	Shore	Grammar	King's
2011	Sydney Boy's High	St Ignatius'	St Joseph's
2012	Sydney Boy's High	St Joseph's	St Ignatius'
2014	St Joseph's	King's	St Ignatius'
2015	St Joseph's	Shore	King's
2016	Shore	St Ignatius'	St Joseph's
2017	Shore	St Ignatius'	King's
2018	Shore	St Joseph's	Grammar
2019	Shore	St Joseph's	St Ignatius'
2020			
2021	King's	St Joseph's	St Ignatius'
2022	Shore	King's	St Ignatius
2023	St Ignatius'	Shore	Newington
2024	Shore	St Ignatius’	St Joseph's
2025	Shore	St Ignatius’	King's
2026	St Ignatius'	St Joseph's	King's

The current (SIRC) record time for the 2nd Year 10 VIII is 6:20.81 set by the Shore School on 12 March 2016.

==== The 3rd Year 10 VIII ====
Results
Year	Winner	2nd	3rd
2002	Shore 1	Shore 2	St Ignatius'
2003	Shore	St Joseph's	High
2004	Shore 1	Shore 2	St Ignatius'
2005	Shore 1	King's	Shore 2
2006	Shore	King's	St Joseph's
2007	Shore	St Ignatius'	King's
2008	St Ignatius' 1	King's 1	St Joseph's
2009	King's	St Ignatius'	Newington
2010	St Joseph's	St Ignatius'	Scots
2011	King's	St Ignatius'	St Joseph's
2012	Shore	St Joseph's	St Ignatius'
2013	Shore	King's	St Joseph's
2014	St Ignatius'	St Joseph's	Newington
2015	King's	Scots	St Joseph's
2016	St Joseph's	Shore	Scots
2017	St Ignatius'	St Joseph's	Newington
2018	Shore	St Joseph's	Grammar
2019	St Joseph's	Shore	St Ignatius'
2020			
2021	St Ignatius'	Shore	King's
2022	King's	St Ignatius'	Shore
2023	St Ignatius'	Shore	Newington
2024	St Ignatius'	Shore	St Joseph's
2025	Shore	St Ignatius'	St Joseph's
2026	St Ignatius'	Shore	St Joseph's

The current (SIRC) record time for the 3rd Year 10 VIII is 6:29.49 set by The King's School on 28 March 2009.

Due to an unprecedented depth in the number of junior rowers, the 4th Year 10 VIII race was added to the regatta in 2009.

==== The 4th Year 10 VIII ====
Results
Year	Winner	2nd	3rd
2009	St Ignatius' 1	King's 1	Shore
2010	St Joseph's	St Ignatius'	King's
2011	St Ignatius' 1	King's 1	St Ignatius' 2
2012	St Joseph's 1	Shore	St Joseph's 2
2013	Shore	St Joseph's	St Ignatius' 1
2014	St Joseph's	St Ignatius' 1	King's
2015	St Joseph's	Scots	King's
2016	Scots 1	St Joseph's 2	St Joseph's 1
2017	Shore	Newington	Scots
2018	Shore	St Joseph's	
2019	St Joseph's	Shore	
2020			
2021	St Ignatius'	King's	
2022	St Ignatius'	King's	St Joseph's
2023	Shore	St Ignatius'	
2024	St Ignatius’ 1	Shore	St Ignatius’ 2
2025	St Ignatius’ 1	Shore	St Joseph's 1
2025	St Ignatius’ 1	Shore	Scots

The current (SIRC) record time for the 4th Year 10 VIII is 6:34.87 set by St Joseph's College on 10 March 2012.

== NSW Schoolgirls Head of the River Regatta Results ==
=== Regatta winners ===
1st VIII (The Head of the River) – NSW Union of Ex-Oarswomen Rose Evans trophy
Year	Winner	2nd	3rd
1990	Loreto Normanhurst		
1991	Loreto Normanhurst		
1992	Sydney Girls		
1993	North Sydney		
1994	Sydney Girls		
1995	Wenona		
1996	SCEGGS	Sydney Girls High School	
1997	Loreto Normanhurst	Sydney Girls High School	
1998	Pymble		
1999	Pymble	Wenona	Ascham
2000	Pymble	Queenwood	PLC Sydney
2001	Pymble	Loreto Normanhurst	Loreto Kirribilli
2002	Pymble	PLC Sydney	Loreto Kirribilli
2003	Pymble	Loreto Kirribilli	Canberra Girls' Grammar
2004	Pymble	Loreto Kirribilli	PLC Sydney
2005	Pymble	Loreto Kirribilli	Canberra Girls' Grammar
2006	Pymble	Queenwood	Roseville
2007	Pymble	PLC Sydney	Loreto Kirribilli
2008	Pymble	PLC Sydney	Canberra Girls' Grammar
2009	Pymble	Queenwood	Loreto Kirribilli
2010	Queenwood	Loreto Kirribilli	Loreto Normanhurst
2011	Queenwood	Pymble	Loreto Kirribilli
2012	Pymble	Queenwood	Loreto Normanhurst
2013	Queenwood	Pymble	Canberra Girls' Grammar
2014	Queenwood	Pymble	Loreto Normanhurst
2015	Loreto Normanhurst	Pymble	Queenwood
2016	Queenwood	Kinross Wolaroi	Loreto Normanhurst
2017	Queenwood	Pymble	Kinross Wolaroi
2018	Pymble	Queenwood	Loreto Normanhurst
2019	Queenwood	Pymble	Loreto Normanhurst
2020	Cancelled due to COVID-19 Pandemic		
2021	Kinross Wolaroi	Queenwood	Pymble
2022	Kinross Wolaroi	Pymble	Queenwood
2023	St Catherine's	Queenwood	Pymble

The current (SIRC) record time for the go 1st VIII is 6:38.08 set by St Catherine's NSW on 18 March 2023.

Overall Pointscore – The Betty Deer Rosebowl
Year	Winner	2nd	3rd
1992	Sydney Girls		
1993	Sydney Girls		
1994	Sydney Girls		
1995	Wenona		
1996	SCEGGS		
1997	Loreto Normanhurst		
1998	Loreto Normanhurst		
1999	Pymble		
2000	Pymble		
2001	Pymble		
2002	Pymble		
2003	Pymble		
2004	Pymble		
2005	Pymble		
2006	Pymble		
2007	Pymble		
2008	Pymble	Canberra Girls' Grammar	
2009	Pymble		
2010	Canberra Girls' Grammar		
2011	Loreto Normanhurst	Canberra Girls' Grammar	Pymble
2012	Pymble	Loreto Normanhurst	Canberra Girls' Grammar
2013	Pymble		
2014	Pymble		
2015	Pymble		
2016	Loreto Normanhurst		
2017	Canberra Girls' Grammar		
2018	Pymble		
2019	Pymble		
2020	Cancelled due to COVID-19 Pandemic		
2021	Pymble		
2022	Pymble		
2023	Pymble	Queenwood	Loreto Kirribilli
2024	Loreto Kirribilli		

1st Coxed IV (2nd VIII from 2007) – Sydney University Women's Sports Union Trophy
Year	Winner	2nd	3rd
1996	Loreto Normanhurst		
1997	SCEGGS		
1998	Loreto Normanhurst		
1999	Loreto Normanhurst	Pymble	Loreto Kirribilli
2000	Pymble	Loreto Kirribilli	Queenwood
2001	Loreto Kirribilli	Pymble	Loreto Normanhurst
2002	Canberra Girls' Grammar	Sydney Girls	Loreto Kirribilli
2003	Pymble	SCEGGS	PLC Sydney
2004	Loreto Kirribilli	Pymble	SCEGGS
2005	Pymble	Loreto Kirribilli	Queenwood
2006	Pymble	Canberra Girls' Grammar	Queenwood
2007	Sydney Girls	MLC	Ascham
2008	Pymble	Canberra Girls' Grammar	Roseville
2009	Pymble	Queenwood	Canberra Girls' Grammar
2010			
2011			
2012			
2013			
2014	Queenwood	Canberra Girls' Grammar	Loreto Normanhurst

1st Quad – Union of Boat Race Officials shield
Year	Winner	2nd	3rd
1996	SCEGGS		
1997	Loreto Normanhurst		
1998	Canberra Girls' Grammar		
1999	Pymble	Loreto Normanhurst	SCEGGS
2000	Pymble	Queenwood	MLC
2001	Loreto Normanhurst	North Sydney	Pymble
2002	Pymble	Canberra Girls' Grammar	Roseville
2003	Pymble	Canberra Girls' Grammar	Loreto Kirribilli
2004	Pymble	Canberra Girls' Grammar	Loreto Kirribilli
2005	Canberra Girls' Grammar	Pymble	Loreto Kirribilli
2006	Pymble	Canberra Girls' Grammar	Loreto Normanhurst
2007	Queenwood	Riverside Girls	Ascham
2008	Queenwood	Kinross Wolaroi	Tara
2009	Tara	Radford	Ascham

Open Four – University of New South Wales Trophy
Year	Winner	2nd	3rd
1994	Wenona		
1995	Redlands		
1996	MLC		
1997	MLC		
1998	Ascham		
1999	Queenwood	Redlands	Roseville
2000	North Sydney		
2001	Not awarded		
2002	SCEGGS	South Grafton HS	–
2003	North Sydney	Redlands	Ascham
2004	Roseville	Loreto Normanhurst	Redlands
2005	Not awarded		
2006	Sydney Girls	Ascham	Radford
2007	Sydney Girls	MLC	Ascham
2008	Ascham	Newcastle	MLC
2009	"'Not awarded'"		

Open Single Scull – NSW Union of Oarswomen Golden Scull Trophy – Betty Spurling Memorial
Year	Winner	2nd	3rd
1993	Westfields		
1994	Loreto Kirribilli		
1995	Loreto Kirribilli		
1996	Roseville		
1997	PLC Sydney		
1998	Albion Park		
1999	Fort Street	Loreto Normanhurst	PLC Sydney
2000	Loreto Normanhurst	MLC	Barrenjoey HS
2001	Kotara HS	Conservatorium	Queenwood
2002	MLC	Warners Bay	Loreto Kirribilli
2003	Loreto Kirribilli	Ravenswood	St Paul's
2004	Maclean HS	Ascham	North Sydney
2005	Shoalhaven HS	Canberra Girls' Grammar	Hunter School
2006	South Grafton HS	Maclean HS	St Paul's
2007	Kingswood HS	South Grafton HS	St Paul's
2008	Kingswood HS	Pymble	South Grafton HS
2009	Canberra Girls' Grammar	Riverside Girls	Crestwood
2010	Fort Street High	St Paul's Grammar	St Marys High
2011	Stella Maris College	Mackellar Girls	Killara High
2012	Stella Maris College	Ascham	Mackellar Girls
2013	Mackellar Girls	Dickson College	St Paul's Grammar
2014	Tara	Sydney Girls	Canberra Girls' Grammar
2015	Ascham	Kinross Wolaroi	Sydney Girls High
2016	Sydney Girls High	St Scholastica	Marist Sisters Woolwich
2017	Sydney Girls High	St Scholastica	Marist Sisters Woolwich
2018	St Scholastica	John Paul College	Trinity Catholic College Lismore
2019	John Paul College	Barker College	Hunter Valley Grammar
2020	Cancelled due to COVID-19 Pandemic		
2021	Tara Anglican School for Girls	Cammeraygal High	Burwood Girls High
2022	Ascham	Ascham	Tara Anglican School for Girls
2023	Loreto Normanhurst	Model Farms HS	PLC Sydney

Year 10 Quad – Margaret Varady Trophy
Year	Winner	2nd	3rd
1998	Loreto Kirribilli		
1999	Loreto Kirribilli		
2000	Ascham	Loreto Kirribilli	South Grafton HS
2001	Roseville	Loreto Kirribilli	Pymble
2002	South Grafton HS	Loreto Normanhurst	North Sydney
2003	Roseville	Canberra Girls' Grammar	Pymble
2004	Pymble	Canberra Girls' Grammar	Roseville
2005	Canberra Girls' Grammar	Pymble	Roseville
2006	PLC Sydney	Queenwood	Canberra Girls' Grammar
2007	Pymble	Roseville	PLC Sydney
2008	Roseville	PLC Sydney	Loreto Kirribilli
2009	Ascham	Canberra Girls Grammar	Pymble
2010	Pymble	Loreto Kirribilli	PLC Sydney
2011	Loreto Normanhurst	Radford College	MLC School
2012	Loreto Normanhurst	Kinross Wolaroi	PLC Sydney
2013	Radford College	Pymble	Kinross Wolaroi
2014	Kinross Wolaroi	Loreto Normanhurst	Canberra Girls Grammar
2015	Pymble	Kinross Wolaroi	Loreto Normanhurst
2016	Kinross Wolaroi	Loreto Normanhurst	Pymble
2017	Canberra Girls Grammar	Kinross Wolaroi	Pymble
2018	Canberra Girls Grammar	Kinross Wolaroi	PLC Sydney
2019	Pymble	Redlands	Canberra Girls Grammar
2020	Cancelled due to COVID-19 Pandemic		
2021	Pymble	Canberra Girls Grammar	Redlands
2022	Pymble	Loreto Normanhurst	Redlands
2023	Canberra Girls Grammar	Redlands	Radford College

Year 9 Coxed Quad Scull – UTS Rowing Club Perpetual Trophy
Year	Winner	2nd	3rd
2004	Roseville	Pymble	Canberra Girls' Grammar
2005	Queenwood		
2006	Roseville	Loreto Normanhurst	Kinross Wolaroi
2007	Kinross Wolaroi	PLC Sydney	Roseville
2008	Ascham	Queenwood	Kinross Wolaroi
2009	Loreto Normanhurst	PLC Sydney	Tara
2010	Queenwood	Loreto Normanhurst	Radford
2011	Loreto Normanhurst	Queenwood	PLC Sydney
2012	Tara	Queenwood	Pymble
2013	Tara	Loreto Normanhurst	Pymble
2014	Pymble	Ascham	Loreto Normanhurst
2015	Kinross Wolaroi	Queenwood	Loreto Normanhurst
2016	Loreto Kirribilli	Queenwood	Canberra Girls Grammar
2017	Canberra Girls Grammar	Queenwood	Loreto Normanhurst
2018	Canberra Girls Grammar	Pymble	Hunter Valley Grammar
2019	Loreto Kirribilli	Pymble	Queenwood
2020	Cancelled due to COVID-19 Pandemic		
2021	Pymble	Loreto Kirribilli	St Catherine's
2022	Pymble	Queenwood	Loreto Kirribilli
2023	Kinross Wolaroi	Pymble	Loreto Kirribilli

== See also ==
- Head of the River (Australia)
- Athletic Association of the Great Public Schools of New South Wales
- Association of Heads of Independent Girls' Schools
