= Independent Girls' Schools Sport Association =

IGSSA typically is an acronym for Independent Girls' Schools Sports Association (or variations) and may refer to:

- Independent Girls' Schools Sporting Association (New South Wales)
- Independent Girls Schools Sports Association (Perth)
- Independent Girls' Schools Sports Association (South Australia)
