= Riverview Gold Cup =

Rowing regatta

The Riverview Gold Cup Regatta is a rowing regatta with limited club events and mainly school crew events, held annually by Saint Ignatius' College, Riverview, in Sydney, New South Wales, Australia. It is an official Rowing NSW event within the New South Wales club season. The Riverview Gold Cup is the trophy contested by the men's open senior eight - the blue riband event of the day.

Founded by Father Joseph Dalton, S.J., the founding Rector of Saint Ignatius' College, it is one of the oldest rowing events in Australia and the oldest New South Wales schoolboy regatta. It is held annually, typically in March and raced over 1,400 metres on Sydney's Lane Cove River. As of 2018 it comprises 24 school crew events, six senior open club events, two masters events and two invitational sculling events.

== History ==
The "Riverview Rowing Club" was founded late in 1882 under the guiding hand of Father Thomas Gartlan, S.J. The Rowing Club held its first regatta on Sunday 20 June 1885. It was recorded in many of the daily newspapers of the time and hailed as "the first College Regatta in the Colony"

In the 1890 Regatta, a race was instituted called "The Lane Cove Challenge Eights", which grew into the "Riverview Gold Cup Regatta", from which comes the name of the modern day Regatta. In 1892, the Regatta Committee invited the residents of Lane Cove, and others interested in rowing to subscribe to a fund to acquire a suitable Gold Cup, as a trophy for this race. The result is the Riverview Gold Cup, as we have it today. In 1893, the St. Ignatius' Regatta, featured its valuable Gold Cup for the first time. In this year, nine crews fought out the maiden fours, with North Shore winning by two lengths from Sydney, Glebe third, and East Sydney and Mercantile behind. The regatta itself was said to be a great success: "such cheering and enthusiasm has seldom, if ever before, been noticed at an amateur meeting." The winners were also each awarded gold medals and later gold oars, as individual trophies for this event. At the time of its inception, the Gold Cup was looked upon as an outstanding trophy for rowing.

A second regatta was held in November of that year to honour Catholic Bishops, assembled in Sydney for the first Plenary Council. The programme provided for six events, mainly of College crews and their supporters. From this modest beginning, the Annual Riverview Regatta has grown into thirty four events today with one thousand competitors and ten thousand spectators through the day.

== The Gold Cup ==
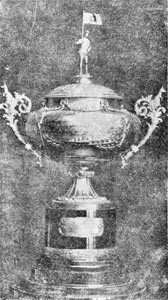
The Gold Cup, c.1893

The Gold Cup Trophy took about three months to complete and was put on show in April 1893. At the time it was said to be the only gold cup for rowing in the world. According to The Town & Country Journal (1 May 1893), apart from its intrinsic value (29 oz. of gold), it was one of the finest specimen of anything of its kind yet manufactured in Australia.

The Cup features the characteristic flora and fauna of Australia. The handles of the trophy come out of the upper portion of the body of the kangaroo, while the garlands and wreaths that ornament it are the leaves and flowers of the waratah. The front of the trophy is engraved with eight-oared boats, in full swing. The figure of an oarsman holding the College flag surmounts the lid.

== The Course ==
At 1400m the five lane course is much shorter than the 2000m raced by senior club crews and school eights. Otherwise the shortest schoolboy courses raced in the Sydney season are of 1500m length. Unusually, the regatta course includes a dog-leg to stroke side around a pylon at the 1100m mark. There is a second pylon at the finish line. Consequently the majority of the events of the day - excepting the four club sculling classes - are contested in coxed boats. Pylon incidents and oar clashes are common; steering a tight corner is a race strategy and many school coxswains come away from the Gold Cup course wiser for the experience.

== Regatta winners (since 1999) ==
=== Men's Open VIII for the Riverview Gold Cup ===
Year	1st	2nd	3rd
1999	Sydney RC	Drummoyne/Mosman	SUBC/Drummoyne
2000	Drummoyne	Sydney RC	SUBC
2001	King's	Grammar	Sydney RC
2002	UTS Haberfield	St Ignatius'	Drummoyne
2003	SUBC/Drummoyne	St Ignatius'	Shore
2004	Shore	SUBC	Drummoyne
2005	SUBC	King's	Sydney Boys High
2006	SUBC/Mosman/UTS	Shore	Grammar
2007	SUBC	King's	Shore
2008	Sydney RC	Shore	St Joseph's
2009	SUBC	Shore	St Joseph's
2010			
2011	SUBC	Sydney RC	King's
2012			
2013			
2014			
2015			
2016	Sydney RC	SUBC	UTS Haberfield
2017	Sydney Rowing Club	Sydney University Boat Club	UTS Rowing Club
2018	SUBC	Sydney RC	scratched

=== Schoolboy VIII ===
Year	1st	2nd	3rd
1999			
2000			
2001			
2002			
2003			
2004			
2005			
2006			
2007			
2008			
2009			
2010			
2011			
2012			
2013			
2014			
2015			
2016			
2017			
2018	Shore	St Joseph's	Scots

=== Schoolgirl VIII for the Centenary Cup ===
Year	1st	2nd	3rd
1999	Pymble	Loreto Normanhurst	Wenona
2000	Pymble	MLC	Redlands
2001	Pymble	Loreto Normanhurst	Ascham
2002	Pymble	Loreto Normanhurst	Sydney Girls
2003	Pymble	Loreto Kirribilli	Loreto Normanhurst
2004	Pymble	Loreto Kirribilli	MLC
2005	Pymble	Roseville	Ascham
2006	Pymble	Queenwood	Roseville
2007	Pymble	Roseville	Loreto Normanhurst
2008	Pymble	Queenwood	Loreto Kirribilli
2009	Pymble	Loreto Kirribilli	Loreto Normanhurst
2010			
2011	>	> Not Contested <	<
2012			
2013			
2014			
2015			
2016			
2017			
2018	>	> Not Contested <	<

=== Schoolboy 1st IV for the Sydney University Cup ===
Year	1st	2nd	3rd
1999	Redlands	Shore	Cranbrook
2000	King's	Shore	Grammar
2001	St Ignatius'	King's	Newington
2002	King's	Grammar	St Ignatius'
2003	King's	St Ignatius'	Redlands
2004	Shore	St Ignatius'	St Joseph's
2005	Shore	St Ignatius'	King's
2006	King's	St Joseph's	Redlands
2007	Shore	Redlands	Newington
2008	Shore	St Ignatius'	King's
2009	Shore	Redlands	St Ignatius'
2010	King's	Scots	St Ignatius'
2011	King's	St Ignatius'	St Augustine's
2012	King's	St Ignatius'	St Joseph's
2013	St Augustine's	Shore	St Ignatius'
2014	St Augustine's	St Joseph's	Newington
2015	St Augustine's	King's	St Ignatius
2016			
2017			
2018	King's	Shore	Newington

== Media attention ==
A video of the St Ignatius 1st VIII crashing into a wooden pole in the last stretch of the race circulated on the internet. It shows the umpire yelling for St Ignatius to "check your course" and "stop rowing", concluding with the boat hitting the pylon and six seat being thrown out.

== See also ==
- Head of the River (Australia)
- Athletic Association of the Great Public Schools of New South Wales
- Association of Heads of Independent Girls' Schools
