= Iona Presentation College =

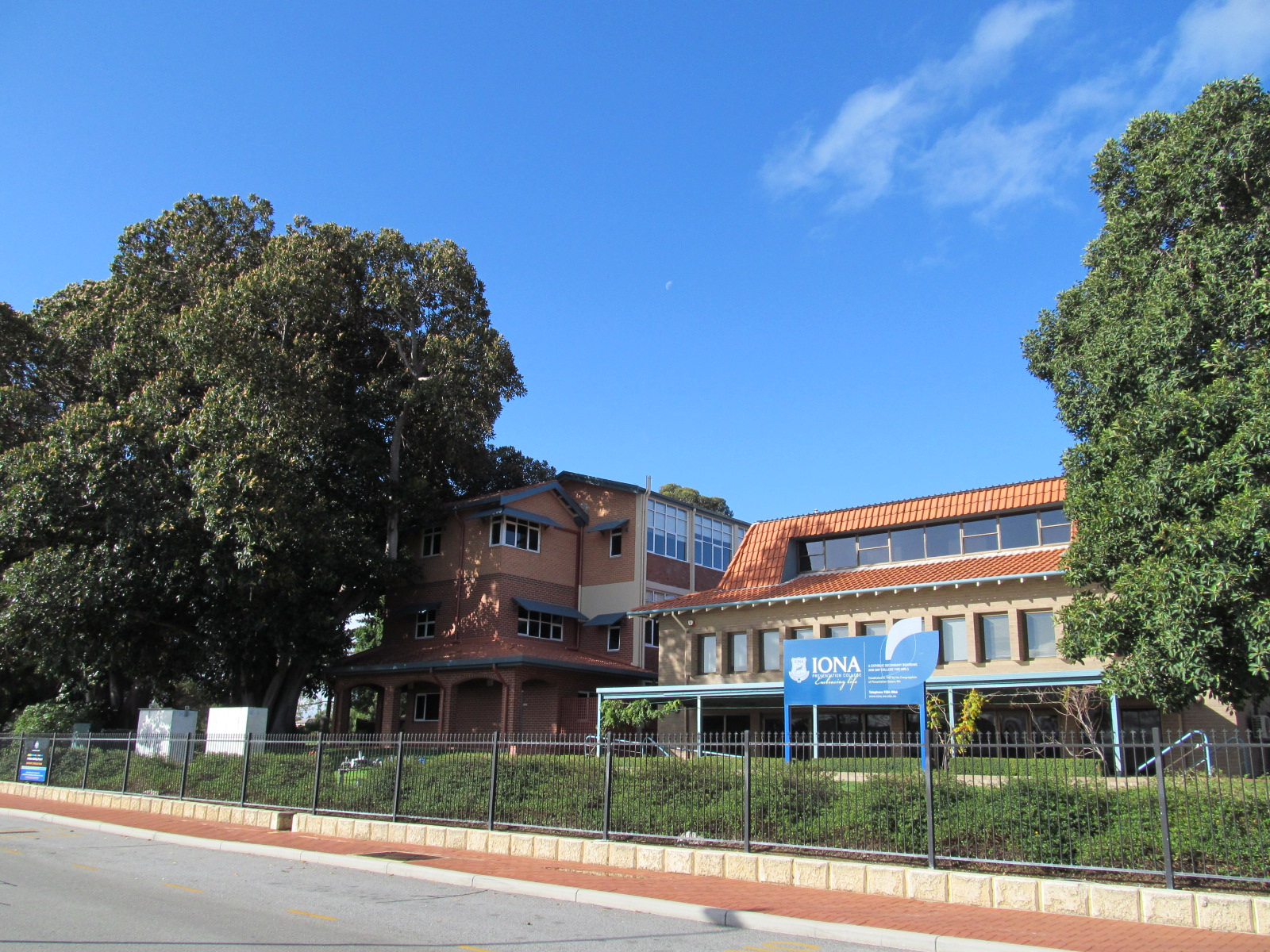
- Exterior of Iona Presentation College, pictured in 2012

Location
- Mosman Park, Perth, Western Australia; Australia
- Coordinates: 32°00′31″S 115°46′03″E

Information
- Former name: Iona Primary School
- Type: Independent early learning, primary and secondary day and boarding school
- Motto: Latin: Pro Deo et Patria (For God and Country)
- Religious affiliation: Presentation Sisters
- Denomination: Roman Catholic
- Established: 11 September 1907; 118 years ago
- Founder: Presentation Sisters
- Principal: Robyn Miller
- Teaching staff: 94.7 FTE (2018)
- Years: Early learning and K–12
- Gender: Co-educational (Early learning to Year 6); Girls only (Year 7 to Year 12)
- Enrolment: 1,089 (2018)
- Colours: Blue and gold
- Affiliation: Alliance of Girls' Schools Australasia; Independent Girls' Schools Sports Association; Association of Independent Schools of Western Australia; Catholic Education Western Australia
- Website: www.iona.wa.edu.au

Iona Presentation College is an independent Catholic early learning, primary and secondary school. It is located in Mosman Park, a suburb of Perth, Western Australia.

Founded in 1907 by the Presentation Sisters, Iona enrolled 1220 students in 2020, from early learning (3-year-old students) to Year 12, of whom one percent identified as Indigenous Australians and twelve percent were from a language background other than English. Iona is co-educational in the early learning and primary school years, and is an all-girls school from Year 7- through to Year 12.

The college is a member of Catholic Education Western Australia, the Independent Girls' Schools Sports Association (IGSSA), the Alliance of Girls' Schools Australia, and the Association of Independent Schools of Western Australia. The principal is Robyn Miller.

== History ==
Iona Presentation College was founded on 11 September 1907, by the Presentation Sisters who came to Australia from Kildare in Ireland.

The college is named after the Scottish island of Iona, on which the Irish Saint Columba founded a community in 563 AD. Iona became a centre of learning from which Saint Columba and his monks spread the Gospel into Scotland and the north of England. Bishop Gibney remarked that the school's location in Mosman Park, situated on a rise, with the Swan River on one side and the ocean on the other, reminded him of the island of Iona. Furthermore, one of the four founding sisters was Sister Columba and so it was decided that an appropriate name for the college would be Iona. In 2007, Iona celebrated its centenary, marking 100 years since the foundation of the college.

== Co-curricular activities ==
Students may join in any of the many cultural, or music groups listed below. In music, private lessons are available in a wide range of instruments and voice training.

Performing arts

College Production (performed at the Regal Theatre, Subiaco), IGSSA Dance, Interhouse Dance, Interhouse Drama, Junior Production, Performing Arts Festival.

Music

Symphony Orchestra, Concert Band, Flute Ensemble, Guitar Ensemble, Percussion Ensemble, Swing Out Sisters, Junior Choir, Senior Choir, Chorale, String Quartet, Rock Band, String Ensemble, Rock Band, and Blues Band.

Other

Apex Fashion Awards, Debating, Da Vinci Decathlon, Duke of Edinburgh, Mathematics Challenge, Media Club, Mock Law Trials, Public Speaking, Community Cook Up, Philosothon, and Robotics Club.

International opportunities

Opportunities are available for students to immerse themselves in different cultures through a range of exchange programs, including to Vietnam, Indonesia, France, and Italy.

Presentation annual event

Every year students are expected to attend "Presentation Night", which is held at the Perth Concert Hall. The event celebrates student achievement as well as music presentations from all year groups.

== Sports ==
The college is a member of the Independent Girls' Schools Sports Association (IGSSA) which gives girls the opportunity for competitive sport at the highest level. Iona has a solid sporting reputation and excellent programs, where students can be involved in a range of sports. The College has won the Athletics in 2020, Swimming in 2019 and is highly competitive in Cross Country in the IGSSA competition. Iona won the IGSSA Swimming Carnival in 2008, 2009, 2010 and 2011.

- Term 1: swimming, volleyball, tennis, cricket
- Term 2: netball, hockey and cross-country
- Term 3: basketball, athletics and soccer, AFL
- Term 4: water polo, softball, cricket

== House system ==
The College house system plays a significant role in the pastoral care of students. There are currently six houses: Moynihan (blue), O'Dowling (green), O'Halloran (yellow), Treacey (red), Columba (purple) and Kildare (orange). The house system consists of a house coordinator who works with staff house leaders and student captains to ensure that all students participate in the many varied house activities. Students are provided with opportunities in the performing arts, dance, sport, music, choral work and the creative arts.

There are six houses in the college:

- Columba House – named after Saint Columba, who spread the Gospel from his base on the island of Iona off Scotland;
- Kildare House – named after Kildare in Ireland, from where many of the founding Sisters originated;
- Moynihan House – named after Sister Columba Moynihan, one of the founding Sisters;
- Treacey House – named after Mother Angela Treacey, one of the founding Sisters;
- OʹHalloran House – named after Sister Paul OʹHalloran, one of the founding Sisters;
- OʹDowling House – named after Sister Joseph OʹDowling, one of the founding Sisters.

== Notable alumnae ==
- Susannah Carr – news anchor for Seven News Perth
- Michaelia Cash – politician
- Lauren Mitchell – Australian artistic gymnast
- Scarlett Stevens – member of Australian band San Cisco
- Larissa Strk – Supreme Court judge
- Pippa Grandison - Actor

== See also ==
- List of schools in the Perth metropolitan area
- Catholic education in Australia
- Education in Western Australia
