= Santa Maria College, Perth =

School in Attadale, Western Australia

Santa Maria College

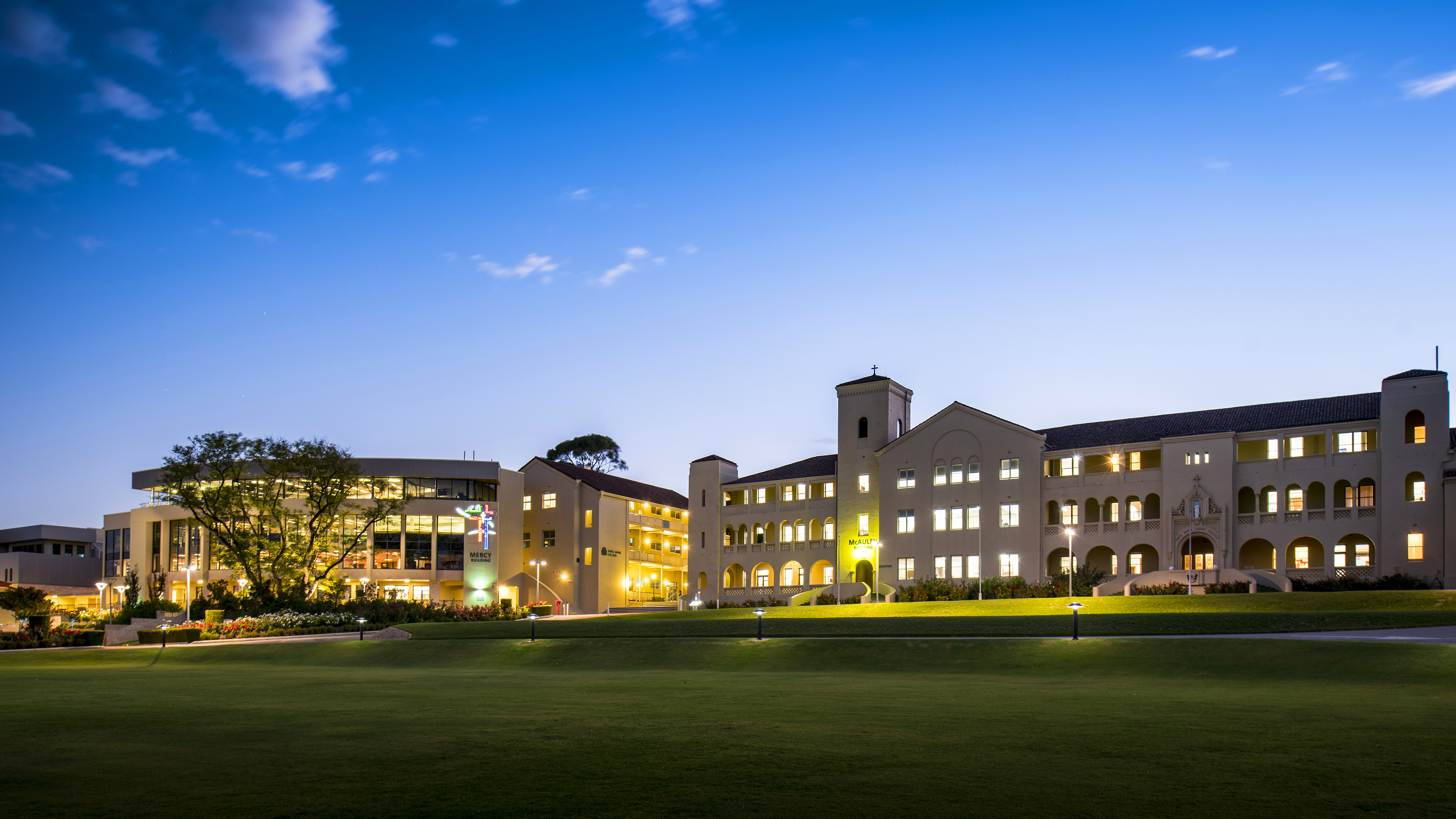
- Santa Maria College in 2024

Location
- Attadale, Perth, Western Australia; Australia; 32°01′08″S 115°47′49″E

Information
- Type: Independent single-sex girls primary and secondary day and boarding school
- Motto: Latin: Soli Deo Gloria (For the Glory of God)
- Religious affiliation: Sisters of Mercy
- Denomination: Roman Catholicism
- Established: 1938; 88 years ago
- Oversight: Mercy Education Limited; Catholic education Office, Diocese of Perth
- Principal: Jennifer Oaten
- Staff: ~182
- Grades: 5–12
- Gender: Girls
- Enrolment: 1300
- Colours: Green, red and white
- Athletics: Independent Girls Schools Sports Association
- Affiliation: Association of Heads of Independent Schools of Australia; Australian Boarding Schools' Association; Alliance of Girls' Schools Australasia
- Brother school: Aquinas College, Perth
- Website: santamaria.wa.edu.au

Santa Maria College is an independent Catholic single-sex primary and secondary day and boarding school for girls located in Attadale, a southern suburb of Perth, Western Australia.

Established by the Sisters of Mercy in 1938, in 2025 the school served 1,300 students from Year 5 to Year 12, including 150 boarders.

The college is affiliated with the Association of Heads of Independent Schools of Australia, the Australian Boarding Schools' Association, the Alliance of Girls' Schools Australasia, and the Independent Girls Schools Sports Association.

Santa Maria's brother school is Aquinas College located in Salter Point.

== History ==
Santa Maria College was established by the Sisters of Mercy and opened on 6 February 1938 in the riverside suburb of Attadale, Western Australia. The College initially enrolled approximately 60 boarders and 13 day students, staffed by seven Sisters of Mercy. The boarding students were transferred from Victoria Square Ladies’ College (now Mercedes College).

The opening ceremony was conducted by Archbishop Prendiville, and the site was chosen for its elevated location with views of the Swan River. The main building, designed in the Spanish Mission style, was the first structure constructed on the property. It was funded through land purchases costing £5,000 and an advance from the bank of £30,000.

The College was developed in response to the increasing demand for boarding places from regional families. During the Second World War it was reviewed for use as a military hospital and hosted Sunday Mass for soldiers stationed nearby. After the war, as Perth’s suburbs expanded, the College transitioned from a primarily boarding school to a growing population of day students.

The school’s origins are grounded in the work of Catherine McAuley, who founded the Sisters of Mercy in 1831 in Dublin, Ireland. The first Sisters arrived in Western Australia in 1846, led by Ursula Frayne, and opened their first school in Perth that same year.

== Governance ==
Santa Maria College operates under the governance of Mercy Education Limited, the delegated authority of the Institute of Sisters of Mercy of Australia and Papua New Guinea (ISMAPNG). Through its board of directors, Mercy Education oversees the governance and operation of eleven Mercy Sponsored Colleges owned by ISMAPNG, including Santa Maria College.

== Associations ==
Santa Maria College is an education provider affiliated with the Catholic Education Western Australia (CEWA), the governing body for Catholic schools in the state. The College is also a member of the Association of Independent Schools of Western Australia (AISWA), which supports the development and advocacy of independent education.

In addition, Santa Maria College is a member of the Independent Girls Schools Sporting Association, which provides access to a range of interschool sporting competitions.

== Principals ==
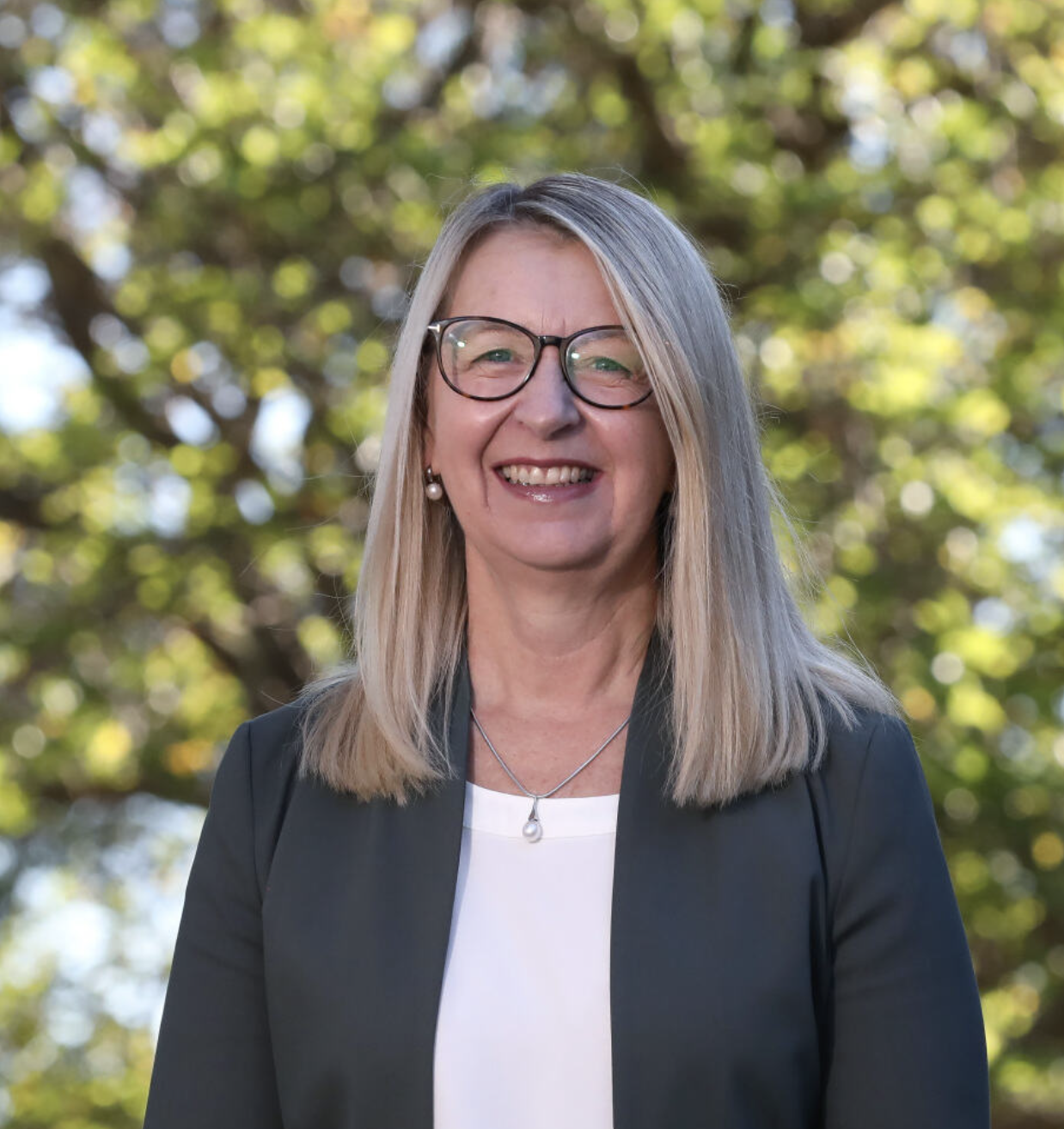
Jennifer Oaten, Principal of Santa Maria College

Jennifer Oaten, a former student of Santa Maria College and previously a Deputy Principal, has served as Principal since 2018.

Since its establishment in 1938, the College has had several Principals. Sister Mary Bertrand was the founding Principal, serving from 1938 to 1960.

== Facilities ==
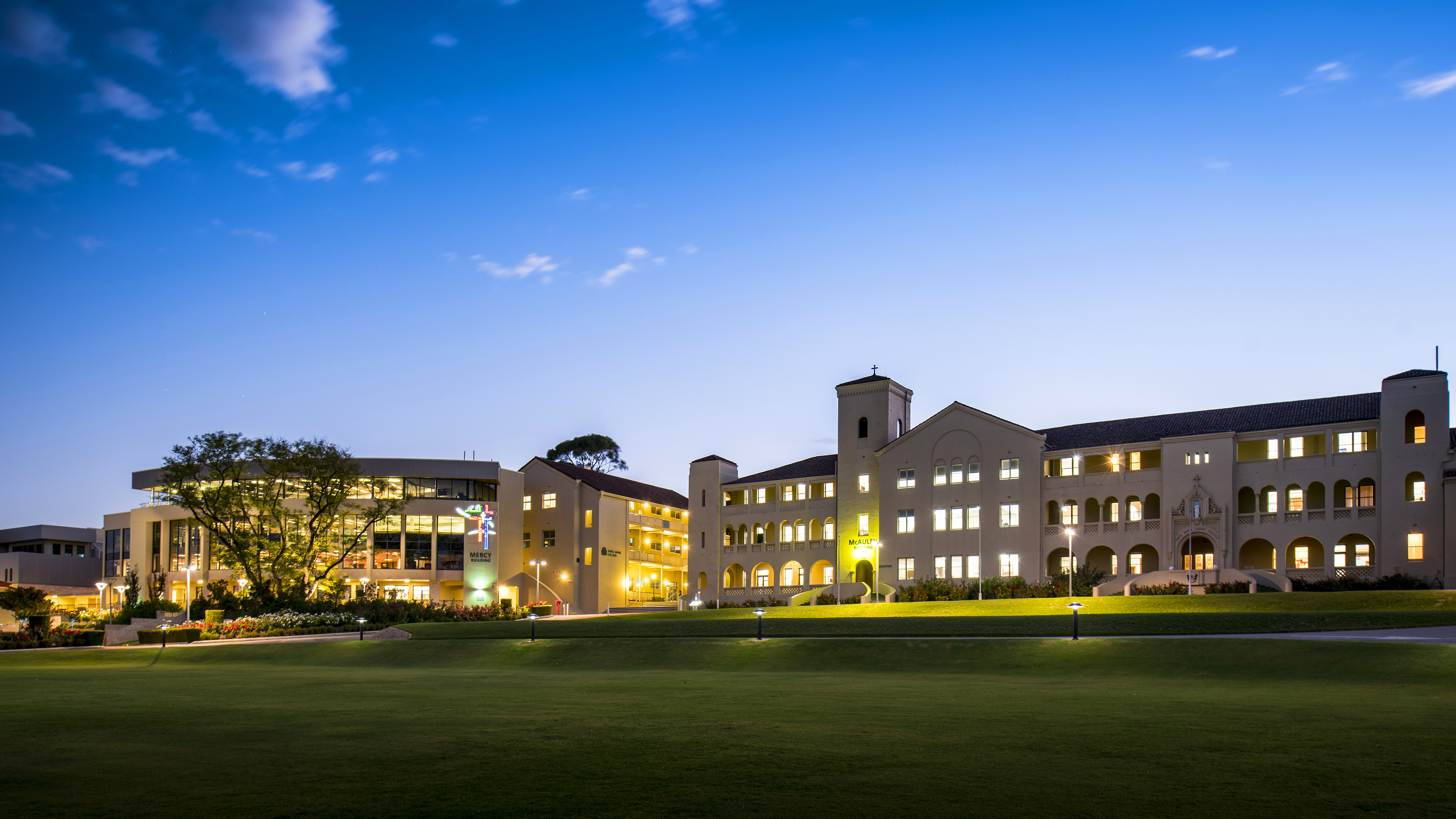
Santa Maria College Campus, Attadale

Santa Maria College is situated on a campus overlooking the Swan River in Attadale. Facilities include a performing arts centre, science laboratories, 25 metre swimming pool, sports fields, and four boarding houses.

Recent developments at the College include the construction of a Cultural Centre, which will feature a 642-seat auditorium, a black box theatre, a dance studio, general learning spaces, and backstage facilities.

The Centre is anticipated to open in early 2026. The College's existing theatre will also be converted into a dedicated orchestra space.

== Academics ==
Santa Maria College offers academic program for students from Years 5 to 12.

In senior secondary education, students can pursue the Australian Tertiary Admission Rank (ATAR) pathway, the ACCESS vocational education and training (VET) pathway, or the UniReady or UniPath university preparation programs. In 2024, 68% of Year 12 students undertook the ATAR pathway, 25% chose the ACCESS pathway, and 8% participated in UniReady or UniPath.

The College recorded a median ATAR of 87.8, with 40% of students attaining an ATAR above 90 and 21% above 95. The highest ATAR achieved was 98.95. Students received 65 academic awards, including 5 Certificates of Excellence, 21 Certificates of Distinction, and 39 Certificates of Merit.

NAPLAN results in 2024 were consistently above national averages. Participation across all tested year levels was 100%.

== Co-curricular activities ==
Santa Maria College offers a broad and inclusive co-curricular program that supports student development across service, sport, the arts, academics, and leadership. Activities are designed to foster teamwork, confidence, creativity, and a sense of belonging.

=== Service and leadership ===
"Mini Vinnies" enable younger students to engage in charitable work through fundraising and awareness campaigns, supporting the mission of the St Vincent de Paul Society. Older students can participate in leadership and service groups including Young Vinnies, Social Justice, and Student Council.

=== Academic and enrichment ===
Students can participate in clubs and competitions in public speaking, robotics, debating, Book Club, STEM, and Study Club. Programs like Mini Mad Scientists and Robotics exist for younger students.

=== Performing and visual arts ===
The College’s music program includes choirs, concert bands, string orchestras, guitar ensembles and percussion groups. Students also participate in dance, drama productions, and visual arts programs.

=== Sport and physical activity ===
Santa Maria College provides interschool sport, specialist training, and recreational activities across all year levels. Options include swimming, running club, cross country, volleyball, pickleball, AFL, and multi-sports programs. Students regularly compete in IGSSA and JIGSSA competitions.

== Strategic Plan and Innovation ==
Santa Maria College's Strategic Plan 2021–2025 outlines a plan created with consultation with students, staff, families, and alumni. The plan seeks to balance tradition with

The Strategic Plan is framed by five key pillars:

- Faith – Deepening the College’s Catholic identity and Mercy values
- Learning for Life – Empowering students with flexible, contemporary learning experiences
- Social Innovation – Encouraging action on local and global challenges through service and enterprise
- Community Activation – Strengthening connections with parents, alumni, and the wider community
- Financial Sustainability – Ensuring the long-term viability of the College through partnerships and effective stewardship of resources

Initiatives include the development of life skills and enterprise capabilities, flexible learning programs, digital transformation, environmental sustainability, and leadership pathways for students.

== House System ==
Santa Maria College operates a House System to promote student leadership, community spirit, and participation in sporting and cultural activities. Students are assigned to one of eight houses upon enrollment, participating in inter-house competitions and events throughout their time at the College.

== Boarding ==
Santa Maria College provides residential boarding for approximately 150 girls from Years 7 to 12, primarily from rural and regional areas of Western Australia.

The boarding community is structured across four houses. Year 7 and Year 12 students are grouped by year level, while students in Years 8 to 11 are accommodated in mixed-age houses to encourage cross-year relationships and peer mentoring. Each student has a private room, and boarding houses include common lounge and kitchen areas.

Boarding staff include a Director of Boarding, Boarding Supervisors, and Housemothers, who provide supervision and pastoral care. Students participate in a transition program called Embrace, designed to support adjustment to boarding.

Boarders engage in a range of co-curricular and recreational activities, both within the College and in the wider Perth area. These include sports, cultural events, and regular interactions with students from other schools.

== See also ==
- List of schools in the Perth metropolitan area
- Catholic education in Australia
