= Independent Girls Schools Association =

Australian organisation

Independent Girls' Schools Association (IGSA)
- Formation: 1922
- Headquarters: North Ryde, New South Wales, Australia
- Members: 32 member schools
- Official language: English
- General Secretary: Mrs Megan Krimmer (Abbotsleigh)
- Website: https://igsa.nsw.edu.au/

The Independent Girls’ Schools Association (formerly known as IGSSA) was established in Sydney, New South Wales, Australia, in 1922 with five founding members, all of them independent girls' schools.

Today, the thirty-two members' schools of AHIGS are eligible to participate and compete against each other in a number of sporting carnivals and interschool sports through IGSA (formerly known as IGSSA). Secondary school girls compete in team and individual sports at school level and can be selected to represent IGSA Sport as part of the NSWCIS and All Schools sporting pathways.

== History ==
The Independent Girls' Schools Sporting Association was established in 1922 as the Girls Secondary Schools Sports Union. Commencing with just five members, all of them independent, Protestant schools for girls, IGSSA grew rapidly in the 1980s and 90s following the introduction of graded competition for many sports, improving competitions and adding new sports.

Today IGSA (or the AHIGS Sporting Committee, formerly known as IGSSA) is a sub–committee of the Association of Heads of Independent Girls' Schools (AHIGS).

== Schools ==
=== Current member schools ===
School	Location	Enrolment	Founded	Denomination	Day/Boarding	School Colours
Abbotsleigh School for Girls	Wahroonga	~1,370	1885	Anglican	Day & Boarding	Black and gold
Ascham School	Edgecliff	~1,000	1886	Non-denominational	Day & Boarding	Navy, red and khaki
Brigidine College	St Ives	~900	1954	Roman Catholic	Day	Maroon, navy and light blue
Canberra Girls' Grammar School	Deakin	~1,450	1926	Anglican	Day & Boarding	Green, red & navy
Danebank Anglican School for Girls	Hurstville	~910	1933	Anglican	Day	Pink, green and teal
Frensham School	Mittagong	~300	1913	Non-denominational	Day & Boarding	Purple, green and white
Kambala	Rose Bay	~950	1887	Anglican	Day & Boarding	Royal blue, gold and dark gray
Kincoppal-Rose Bay	Rose Bay	~930	1882	Roman Catholic	Day & Boarding	Teal and red
Loreto Kirribilli	Kirribilli	~1,030	1901	Roman Catholic	Day	Royal blue, gold and white
Loreto Normanhurst	Normanhurst	~900	1897	Roman Catholic	Day & Boarding	Navy and gold
Meriden	Strathfield	~1700	1897	Anglican	Day	Navy, sky blue and white
MLC School	Burwood	~1,260	1886	Uniting Church	Day	Navy, sky blue and gold-brown
Monte Sant' Angelo Mercy College	North Sydney	~1,080	1875	Roman Catholic	Day	Navy, sky blue and white
Mount St Benedict College	Pennant Hills	~1028	1966	Roman Catholic	Day	Red, navy and white
New England Girls' School	Armidale	~380	1895	Anglican	Day & Boarding	Navy, scarlet and sky blue
Our Lady of Mercy College	Parramatta	~1,030	1889	Roman Catholic	Day	Navy and sky blue
Presbyterian Ladies' College, Armidale	Armidale	~400	1887	Presbyterian	Day & Boarding	Dark green, sky blue and red
Presbyterian Ladies' College, Sydney	Croydon	~1,350	1888	Presbyterian	Day & Boarding	Red, white and black
Pymble Ladies' College	Pymble	~2,135	1916	Uniting Church	Day & Boarding	Navy, red and white
Queenwood School for Girls	Mosman	~800	1925	Non-denominational	Day	Red, dark grey and white
Ravenswood School for Girls	Gordon	~1,140	1901	Uniting Church	Day & Boarding	Navy, gold and white
Roseville College	Roseville	~790	1908	Anglican	Day	Maroon, sky blue and gold
SCEGGS Darlinghurst	Darlinghurst	~890	1895	Anglican	Day	White and navy
St Catherine's School	Waverley	~910	1856	Anglican	Day & Boarding	Gold, red and navy
St Patrick's College	Campbelltown	~850	1840	Roman Catholic	Day	Navy, red and white
St Scholastica's College	Glebe	~1,043	1878	Roman Catholic	Day & Boarding	Navy, sky blue and white
St Vincent's College	Potts Point	~680	1858	Roman Catholic	Day & Boarding	Navy, old gold and white
Santa Sabina College	Strathfield	~1,500	1894	Roman Catholic	Day	Red, white and black
Stella Maris College	Manly	~1,000	1931	Roman Catholic	Day	Red, bottle green and white
Tangara School for Girls	Cherrybrook					Navy, red and white
Tara Anglican School for Girls	North Parramatta	~1,000	1897	Anglican	Day & Boarding	Navy, light blue and white
Wenona School	North Sydney	~815	1886	Non-denominational	Day & Boarding	Navy, red and white

=== Former member schools ===
School	Location	Denomination	Founded	Closed/Merged	Years Competed
Brighton College	Manly		1889	Closed 1960	1922–1960
Claremont College	Randwick	Anglican	1882	Secondary school closed 1966	1922–1966
Normanhurst School	Ashfield	Non-denominational	1882	Closed 1941	1922–1941
Presbyterian Ladies' College	Goulburn	Presbyterian	1921	Closed 1970	1956–1966
Presbyterian Ladies' College	Orange	Presbyterian	1928	Merged 1975 with Wolaroi College to form Kinross Wolaroi School	1928–1975
Sydney Church of England Girls' Grammar School, Redlands	Cremorne	Anglican	1884	Became SCECGS Redlands in 1976	1922–1975
SCEGGS Wollongong	Wollongong	Anglican	1955	Merged 1976 with The Illawarra Grammar School	1955–1976
SCEGGS Moss Vale	Moss Vale	Anglican	1906	Closed 1974	1922–1974
St Luke's Anglican School for Girls'	Dee Why	Anglican	1961	Amalgamated 1992 with Peninsula Anglican Boys School and Roseby Preparatory School to form St Lukes Grammar School	1961–?

== Sports ==
The IGSA Sport Committee (formerly IGSSA) organises competitions among 32 independent girls' schools in New South Wales. Secondary school girls compete in team and individual sports at school level and may be selected through IGSA Sport for higher representative pathways. IGSA Sport works with each member school's physical education and sport programme by providing interschool competition from beginners to elite level.

IGSA Sport graded competitions are held on Saturday mornings and involve between 5000 and 6300 participants each term. Students may choose each term:

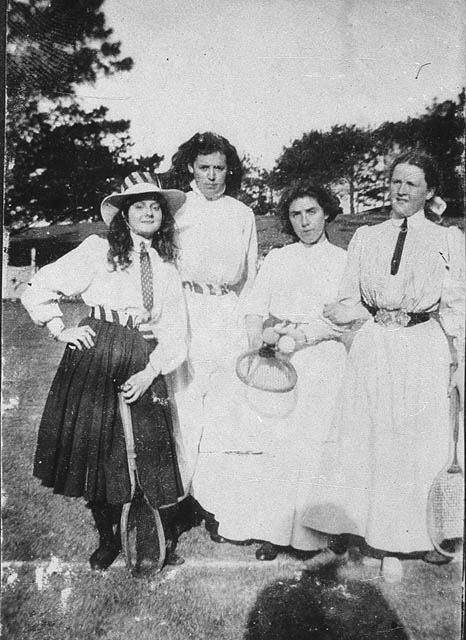
Kambala tennis players, c. 1890s

Term One

- Badminton
- Tennis
- Water Polo
- Touch

Term Two

- Basketball
- Football
- Hockey
- Netball

Term Three

- Netball
- Hockey
- Basketball
- Football

Term Four

- Water polo
- Tennis
- Touch
- Badminton

== Carnivals ==
In addition to IGSA Saturday graded competitions, the association holds six annual carnivals in seven sports:

- Rowing
- Swimming and Diving
- Tildesley Tennis
- Cross Country Running
- Athletics
- Gymnastics

=== Rowing ===
The IGSA Sport Rowing Regatta is typically held in March at the Sydney International Regatta Centre. The ten schools that offer a rowing programme, and therefore regularly compete in the regatta are: Ascham, Canberra Girls' Grammar School, Loreto Kirribilli, Loreto Normanhurst, MLC School, the Presbyterian Ladies' College, Sydney, Pymble Ladies' College, Queenwood School for Girls, Roseville College, and Tara Anglican School for Girls. These schools also make up the bulk of entries at the Schoolgirls Head of the River regatta.

Year	Overall Champion	1st VIII	1st IV	Year 10 Quad
2001	Pymble Ladies' College	Pymble Ladies' College	Pymble Ladies' College	Roseville
2002	Pymble Ladies' College	Pymble Ladies' College	Canberra Girls' Grammar School	Loreto Normanhurst
2003	Pymble Ladies' College	Pymble Ladies' College	Pymble Ladies' College	Roseville
2004	Pymble Ladies' College	Pymble Ladies' College	Canberra Girls' Grammar School	Canberra
2005	Pymble Ladies' College	Pymble Ladies' College	Canberra Girls' Grammar School	Canberra
2006	Pymble Ladies' College	Pymble Ladies' College	Pymble Ladies' College	PLC Sydney
2007	Pymble Ladies' College	Pymble Ladies' College	MLC	Pymble Ladies' College
2008	Pymble Ladies' College	PLC Sydney	Queenwood	PLC Sydney
2009	Canberra Girls Grammar	Pymble Ladies' College	Tara	Ascham
2010	Not held			
2011	Pymble Ladies' College	Queenwood	Ascham	Ascham
2012	Pymble Ladies' College	Pymble Ladies' College	Roseville	Loreto Normanhurst
2013	Pymble Ladies' College	Queenwood	Queenwood	Pymble Ladies' College
2014	Pymble Ladies' College	Queenwood	Pymble Ladies' College	Loreto Normanhurst
2015	Pymble Ladies' College	Loreto Normanhurst	St Catherine's School	Pymble Ladies' College
2016	Canberra Girls' Grammar School	Queenwood	Canberra Girls' Grammar School	Pymble Ladies' College
2017	Canberra Girls' Grammar School	Queenwood	Loreto Normanhurst	Canberra Girls' Grammar School
2018	Pymble Ladies' College	Queenwood	PLC Sydney	Canberra Girls' Grammar School
2019	Pymble Ladies' College	Queenwood	St Catherine's School	Pymble Ladies' College
2020	Pymble Ladies' College	Queenwood	MLC School	St Catherine's School
2021	Pymble Ladies' College	Queenwood	MLC School	Pymble Ladies' College
2022	Loreto Kirribilli	Queenwood	MLC School	Queenwood
2023	Loreto Kirribilli	St Catherine's School	Canberra Girls' Grammar School	Canberra Girls' Grammar School
2024	Loreto Kirribilli	St Catherine's School	Canberra Girls' Grammar School	Canberra Girls' Grammar School

=== Swimming and diving ===
The IGSA Sport Swimming and Diving carnival has been held annually since 1925. Today it is typically held in March at the Sydney Olympic Park Aquatic Centre.

In both sports, schools compete in divisions (three for swimming and two for diving) based on their results from the previous year. Both divisions have the same point score and the highest total point score within each division is deemed the Division Champion and presented with a shield. The winning school from each of the first divisions is awarded the carnival champion.

Year	Diving Champion	Swimming Champion
1999	PLC Sydney	
2000	PLC Sydney	
2001	PLC Sydney	
2002	PLC Sydney	Abbotsleigh
2003	PLC Sydney	Abbotsleigh
2004	PLC Sydney	Abbotsleigh
2005	PLC Sydney	Abbotsleigh
2006	PLC Sydney	Abbotsleigh
2007	PLC Sydney	PLC Sydney
2008	Abbotsleigh	PLC Sydney
2009	Abbotsleigh	PLC Sydney
2010	Abbotsleigh	Abbotsleigh
2011	Abbotsleigh and MLC School	PLC Sydney
2012	Pymble Ladies' College	PLC Sydney
2013	Pymble Ladies' College	PLC Sydney
2014	Pymble Ladies' College	PLC Sydney
2015	Pymble Ladies' College	Abbotsleigh
2016	Pymble Ladies' College	PLC Sydney
2017	Pymble Ladies' College	Abbotsleigh
2018	Pymble Ladies' College	Pymble Ladies' College
2019	Pymble Ladies' College	Pymble Ladies' College
2020	Pymble Ladies' College	Pymble Ladies' College
2021	Pymble Ladies' College	Pymble Ladies' College
2022	PLC Sydney	Pymble Ladies' College
2023	PLC Sydney	PLC Sydney
2024	PLC Sydney	PLC Sydney

=== Athletics ===
The IGSA Sport Track and Field carnival has been held annually since 1923. Today it is typically held in June at Sydney Olympic Park. Competing schools are divided into three divisions based on their results from the previous year. The Division Champions are presented with a shield, with the winning school of the first divisions awarded the carnival champion.

Year	Champion	Year	Champion
1990	Pymble	2010	Pymble
1991	Abbotsleigh	2011	Pymble
1992	Pymble	2012	Pymble
1993	Pymble	2013	Pymble
1994	Pymble	2014	Abbotsleigh
1995	Abbotsleigh	2015	Pymble
1996	Pymble	2016	Pymble
1997	Pymble	2017	Pymble
1998	Pymble	2018	Pymble
1999	Pymble	2019	Pymble
2000	Pymble	2020	Not held due to COVID
2001	Abbotsleigh	2021	Not held due to COVID
2002	Abbotsleigh; Pymble	2022	Pymble
2003	Pymble	2023	Pymble
2004	Abbotsleigh		
2005	Abbotsleigh		
2006	Abbotsleigh		
2007	Abbotsleigh		
2008	Abbotsleigh		
2009	PLC Sydney		

=== Gymnastics ===
The IGSA Sport annual Gymnastics Carnival was first held in 1969. Today the carnival is typically held in October, at the Sydney Olympic Park Sports Centre in Sydney Olympic Park. Students may compete in either Rhythmic (RG) or Artistic (WAG) gymnastics, and schools are placed in divisions (two for rhythmic and three for artistic) based on their results from the previous year. Through combined WAG and RG results, a Champion school is declared.

Year	Overall Champion	WAG	RG
1970	Pymble		
1971	Queenwood		
1972	Queenwood		
1973	Wenona; Canberra		
1974	Wenona; Pymble		
1975	Pymble		
1976	Pymble		
1977	Tara		
1978	SCEGGS		
1979	SCEGGS		
1980	SCEGGS		
1981	SCEGGS		
1982	Pymble		
1983	Pymble		
1984	Pymble		
1985	MLC		
1986	Pymble		
1987	Pymble		
1988	Pymble		
1989	Pymble		
1990	Pymble		
1991	Pymble		
1992	Pymble		
1993	Ravenswood	Pymble	Ravenswood
1994	Pymble	Pymble	Pymble
1995	Pymble	Pymble	Ravenswood
1996	Pymble	Pymble	Pymble
1997	Pymble	Pymble	PLC Sydney
1998	Pymble	Pymble	Pymble
1999	Pymble	Pymble	Pymble
2000	Pymble	Pymble	Pymble
2001	Pymble	Pymble	Pymble
2002	PLC Sydney; Pymble	PLC Sydney	Pymble
2003	Pymble	Pymble	Pymble
2004	PLC Sydney	PLC Sydney	PLC Sydney
2005	PLC Sydney; Pymble	Pymble	PLC Sydney
2006	Pymble	Pymble	Pymble
2007	PLC Sydney; Pymble	Pymble	PLC Sydney
2008	Pymble	Pymble	Pymble
2009	Pymble	Pymble	Pymble
2010	Pymble	Pymble	MLC School
2011	Pymble	PLC Sydney	Meriden
2012	PLC Sydney	PLC Sydney	Meriden
2013	Pymble	PLC Sydney	Meriden
2014	Pymble	Pymble	Meriden
2015	Pymble	Pymble	Meriden
2016	Pymble	Pymble	Ravenswood
2017	Pymble	MLC School	Ravenswood
2018	PLC Sydney	PLC Sydney	Ravenswood
2019	PLC Sydney	PLC Sydney	Ravenswood
2020	Not held due to COVID		
2021	Not held due to COVID		
2022	PLC Sydney	PLC Sydney	Ravenswood
2023	PLC Sydney	PLC Sydney	Ascham

== Tildesley Tennis ==
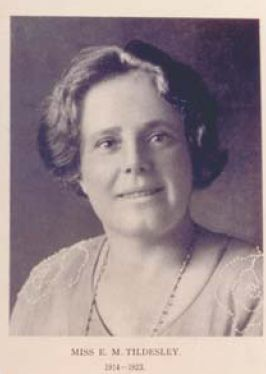
Evelyn Mary Tildesley (1882–1976), Founder of the Tildesley Shield Competition

The Tildesley Tennis Shield competition is IGSSA's longest running carnival. It was first held in 1918, with the now defunct Normanhurst School in Ashfield declared the champion school, and Daphne Akhurst (1903–1933) the winner of the singles competition. Akhurst was to become one of the best female tennis players Australia has ever produced. She was a pupil of Normanhurst School, which in 1918 had as its Headmistress, Miss Evelyn Mary Tildesley (1882–1976) from Staffordshire, England. Normanhurst School had a very successful tennis program, and by the 1920s had produced two of Australia's most famous female tennis players, with Rosie Payten in addition to Daphne Akhurst. It was Tildesley who donated "a beautiful oak and bronze shield" for a tennis competition which encouraged team spirit among Sydney's Protestant girls' schools.

The Shield was to be presented to the school which showed the best average score in tennis, with each school sending a tenth of its students over the age of twelve. The idea behind this was that each school would be able to give many of their pupils the chance of playing, rather than just a few very talented students, as was the case with the School Girls' Championships held by the New South Wales Lawn Tennis Association.

Tildesley was inspired by American tennis tournaments in determining how her competition would be scored. In such tournaments, a percentage of games won against games played is taken. This system of scoring has often been criticised over the years, particularly by the larger schools, and to this day it remains highly unusual for a large school to win the Tildesley Shield. It is however apparent that the reasoning that prompted Tildesley was that of encouraging more participation in tennis among the 12 Protestant schools operating in 1918, and to have a scoring system which rewarded the school with the best average.

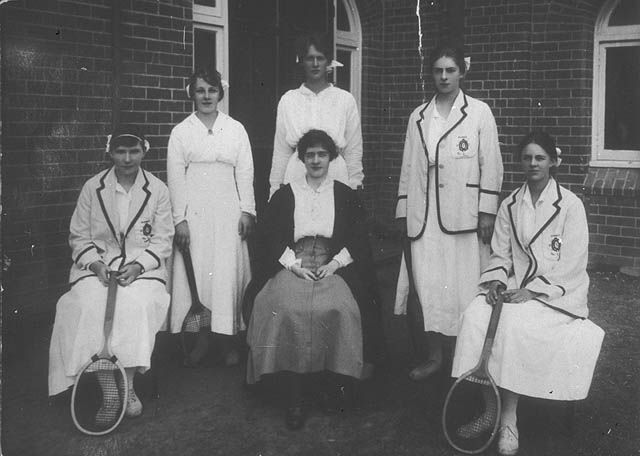
Pymble tennis team, 1917

Until 1922, the competition was managed by the Girls Secondary Schools Lawn Tennis Association, and after this time, the Girls Secondary Schools Sports Union (now IGSSA). From 1922 until 1944, the Tildesley Shield was held, where possible, on three consecutive Saturdays in October at White City Stadium. In 1918 it was held at the Double Bay Courts, as White City was then a fun parlour which was taken over for grass courts circa 1920–21. Matches were the best of eight games, with entries based on a 1:15 ratio for girls 12 years and over on 1 October, with a minimum of 12 (6 singles, 3 doubles) and a maximum of 32 (16 singles, 8 doubles).

From 1944 to 1946, the numbers were modified to 1:25, with a minimum of eight (4 singles, 2 doubles) and a maximum of 20 (10 singles, 5 doubles). In 1947 it reverted to the original scheme until 1971 when the entry scheme was redrafted. In 1980, it was again redrafted to a system of a 1:22 ratio, by Miss Patti Dyson, then Headmistress of PLC Sydney. All matches are now one set only, first to 9 games, no advantage. A tie-breaker is used at 7–all in quarter finals, semi-finals and finals only. Games won, games lost, games played in all singles and doubles matches are totalled for each school, with the final percentage for each school being the number of games won over the number of games played.

The continuous attempts to redraft the conditions of the Shield are largely due to the prestigious place the competition holds in Independent Girls' School Tennis. However, it has remained essential that the conditions stay true to the principles of the donor. If Miss Tildesley had wished the Shield to be reserved for the champions, which would have led to her school winning more often, then the conditions of play would have been much different. However, Tildesley, along with her sister Beatrice and Mr Henry Marsh, who had developed the concept with her, insisted that the school with the best average of games won the Shield. As Marsh explained in his article in the Normanhurst Jubilee Magazine:

It is the most coveted trophy in school tennis because it teaches the girls to play for their school rather than for themselves, its special value lying in the fact that at least 12 girls, with a maximum of 32, according to the number of pupils over 12 years of age, compete for the trophy, thereby giving a number of the younger girls an opportunity of representing their School which they would not otherwise get until much later.

In 1998, Mr Peter Spender donated a trophy for the Most Improved Tildesley Shield Tournament School, in memory of his wife Diane Greaves, an ex–SCEGGS Darlinghurst student. Any school who improves their position from the previous year automatically becomes eligible to win the Spender trophy.

Today the Tildesley Shield Competition is open to all IGSSA schools, with 24 of them typically choosing to compete, and takes place at Eastwood Thornleigh District Tennis Association courts at Pennant Hills, New South Wales over three consecutive days, usually in March / April. Entry is accepted according to a ratio of secondary enrolments to a maximum number of matches in singles and doubles, which may change slightly each year due to changes in enrolment numbers.

=== Tildesley Shield winners ===
Year	School	Year	School	Year	School
1918	Normanhurst School	1964	MLC	2010	Meriden
1919	Ravenswood	1965	Ascham	2011	Meriden
1920	Normanhurst School	1966	Not Held	2011	Meriden
1921	Ravenswood	1967	Abbotsleigh	2012	Meriden
1922	Ascham	1968	SCEGGS Wollongong	2013	Meriden
1923	Ravenswood	1969	SCEGGS Wollongong	2014	Meriden
1924	Claremont College	1970	Wenona	2015	Meriden
1925	Claremont College	1971	Wenona	2016	Meriden
1926	Ascham	1972	Abbotsleigh	2017	Meriden
1927	Ascham	1973	Abbotsleigh	2018	Meriden
1928	Ascham	1974	Not Completed	2019	Meriden
1929	Normanhurst School	1975	Abbotsleigh	2020	Meriden
1930	Ascham	1976	Abbotsleigh	2021	Meriden
1931	Normanhurst School	1977	Abbotsleigh	2022	Meriden
1932	Ascham	1978	Abbotsleigh	2023	Meriden
1933	Normanhurst School	1979	Queenwood	2024	Meriden
1934	Normanhurst School	1980	Abbotsleigh		
1935	Normanhurst School	1981	Queenwood		
1936	Normanhurst School	1982	Roseville		
1937	Ascham	1983	Roseville		
1938	Abbotsleigh	1984	Ravenswood		
1939	SCEGGS	1985	Ravenswood		
1940	MLC	1986	Ravenswood		
1941	MLC	1987	Ravenswood		
1942	Ascham	1988	Ravenswood		
1943	Not Held	1989	Ravenswood		
1944	Ascham	1990	Ravenswood		
1945	Ascham	1991	Ravenswood		
1946	Ascham	1992	Ascham		
1947	MLC	1993	Queenwood		
1948	Queenwood	1994	Queenwood		
1949	Queenwood	1995	Ravenswood		
1950	Kambala	1996	Roseville		
1951	Queenwood	1997	Pymble		
1952	Abbotsleigh	1998	Kincoppal		
1953	Abbotsleigh	1999	Kincoppal		
1954	Abbotsleigh	2000	Kincoppal		
1955	Wenona	2001	Abbotsleigh		
1956	Wenona	2002	Roseville		
1957	Abbotsleigh	2003	Roseville		
1958	Abbotsleigh	2004	SCEGGS		
1959	MLC	2005	Roseville		
1960	MLC	2006	NEGS		
1961	MLC	2007	Roseville		
1962	Ascham	2008	Roseville		
1963	Wenona	2009	NEGS		

== Notable IGSA sportswomen ==
Athletics

- Melinda Gainsford-Taylor (St Vincents)

Cricket

- Margaret Elizabeth Maynard Peden (Abbotsleigh)
- Ellyse Perry (Pymble)

Cycling

- Kate Bates (Tara and PLC Sydney)

Diving

- Vanessa Baker (MLC School)
- Bindi Mansfield (Meriden)
- Kathyrn Blackshaw (Meriden)
- Nicole Ng (PLC Sydney)

Gymnastics

- Danielle Le Ray – Olympic Rhythmic Gymnast (Meriden)
- Amelia McVeigh – Rhythmic Gymnast (PLC Sydney)

Netball

Rowing

- Jennifer Emerson (PLC Sydney)
- Elizabeth Kell (MLC School)
- Julia Veness-Collins (PLC Sydney)

Football

- Ellyse Perry (Pymble)

Skiing

- Cynthia Mitchell (Santa Sabina)
- Zali Steggall (Queenwood)

Swimming

- Natasha Bowron (PLC Sydney)
- Lorraine Crapp (MLC School)
- Margaret Elaine Dovey (SCEGGS)
- Nanette Duncan (PLC Sydney)
- Elizabeth Fraser (PLC Sydney)
- Felicity Galvez (MLC School)
- Emma Johnson (PLC Sydney)
- Melissa Mitchell (Pymble)
- Ming Xiu Ong (Pymble)
- Annabelle Williams (PLC Sydney)

Tennis

- Daphne Akhurst (Normanhurst School)
- Sophie Ferguson (Pymble)
- Nicole Kriz (PLC Sydney)

Waterpolo

- Matilda Kearns (Queenwood)

== See also ==
- List of non-government schools in New South Wales
