= Loreto Kirribilli =

Private girls' school on Sydney's Lower North Shore in New South Wales, Australia

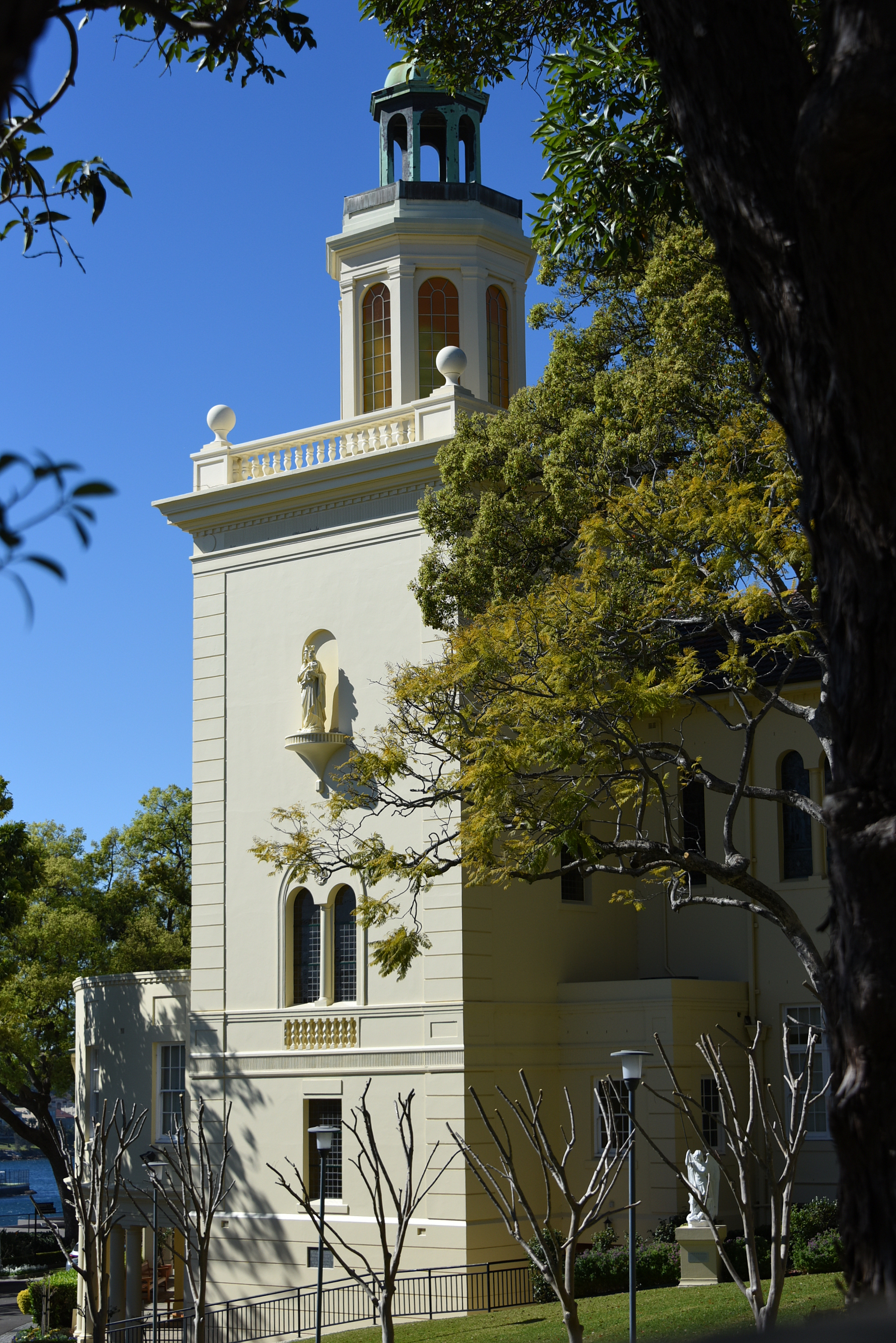
- Loreto Chapel Tower

Location
- 85 Carabella Street; Kirribilli, New South Wales, 2061; Australia; 33°50′49″S 151°12′59″E

Information
- Type: Independent comprehensive single-sex primary and secondary day school
- Motto: Mary, Queen of Angels, as I Live I Trust in the Cross
- Religious affiliations: Institute of the Blessed Virgin Mary, or Sisters of Loreto
- Denomination: Catholic
- Established: 1901; 125 years ago
- Principal: Nicole Archard
- Staff: ~99 (2011)
- Years: K–12
- Gender: Girls
- Enrolment: 1,142 (2021)
- Colours: Royal blue, gold and white
- Affiliations: Association of Heads of Independent Schools of Australia; Junior School Heads Association of Australia; Alliance of Girls' Schools Australasia; Association of Heads of Independent Girls' Schools
- Website: loreto.nsw.edu.au

Loreto Kirribilli is an independent Catholic comprehensive single-sex primary and secondary day school for girls, located in Kirribilli, a Lower North Shore suburb of Sydney, New South Wales, Australia.

Established at Milsons Point in 1901, Loreto has a selective enrolment policy and currently caters for approximately 1,142 girls from Kindergarten to Year 12.

The school is affiliated with the Association of Heads of Independent Schools of Australia (AHISA), the Junior School Heads Association of Australia (JSHAA), the Alliance of Girls' Schools Australasia (AGSA), and is a member of the Association of Heads of Independent Girls' Schools (AHIGS).

Loreto Kirribilli is one of many schools around the world established by the Institute of the Blessed Virgin Mary, or Sisters of Loreto, founded some 400 years ago by Mary Ward.

Its Sydney sister school is Loreto Normanhurst, and there are five other Loreto schools across Australia, in Melbourne, Ballarat, Victoria, Adelaide, Brisbane and Perth, as well as other international schools such as St Mary's Shaftesbury and Saint Mary's Ascot in the UK.

== History ==
Loreto Kirribilli was founded in 1901 following the move of the day school of Loreto Randwick (founded 1892) to Kunimbla, a house in Milsons Point. In 1907, increasing enrolments necessitated a move to Fern Hill, a house in Upper Pitt Street, and in 1907 to the current site in Carabella Street.

Elamang, a home owned by early settler James Milson, was purchased in 1907 with the financial assistance of Sarah Heaton, mother of, Philomena Heaton (Institute of the Blessed Virgin Mary (IBVM)), a founding member of the Kirribilli community. This purchase allowed for boarders and an increase in day students. Adjacent properties were purchased over the years, including Coreena (previously owned by Alfred Milson) in 1921, The Hermitage in 1924, Thoms in 1952, and Araluen in 1975. The Loreto Kirribilli Chapel Tower was the highest point on the Kirribilli Peninsula for many years and remains a landmark dominating the skyline when viewed from Neutral Bay. Once the junior school, The Hermitage, was demolished in 1936 to make way for a playing field and tennis courts, and Coreena was replaced in 1961 by the present junior school. Government funding in the 1960s allowed for the building of St Joseph's wing, including science rooms and a library. This was also an era of significant growth in student numbers.

The boarding school began its phasing out period in 1968, following an explosion which destroyed St Mary's (Thoms). Loreto's last boarding students left in 1972. In 1980, Araluen, which had previously been a music centre, was extended to provide accommodation for the Loreto Sisters, and the community areas in the Elamang building were converted for use as staff rooms, general school administration and music.

In 2010, Loreto acquired the neighbouring Tremayne Private Hotel, formerly a Y.W.C.A. and renamed it the Marian Centre.

== Principals ==
List of Loreto Kirribilli principals
Ordinal	Officeholder	Term start	Term end	Time in office	Notes
1	Eulalia Hyland	1920	1925	4–5 years	
2	Elizabeth Forbes	1925	1929	3–4 years	
3	Rita Nolan	1932	1937	4–5 years	
4	Canice Woods	1938	1942	3–4 years	
5	Mechitilde Farrell	1942	1948	5–6 years	
6	Emilian Cowden	1949	1954	4–5 years	
7	Miriam Nowotny	1955	1956	0–1 years	
8	Jude Lane	1957	1958	0–1 years	
9	Angela Quill	1959	1965	5–6 years	
10	Juliana Coughlin	1966	1969	2–3 years	
11	Noni Mitchell	1970	1970	0 years	
12	Anne Anderson	1971	1971	0 years	
13	Jeanne Cover	1972	1981	8–9 years	
14	Mary Wright	1981	1985	3–4 years	
15	Margaret Honner	1986	1992	5–6 years	
16	Anne Kelly	1993	1999	5–6 years	
17	Janet Freeman	1999	2013	13–14 years	
18	Anna Dickinson	2014	2023	8–9 years	
19	Nicole Archard	2024	Incumbent	1–2 years	

== Curriculum ==
=== Compulsory subjects ===
In the Loreto senior school the following subjects are compulsory:

- Religion – from year 7–12
- English – from year 7–12
- Maths – from year 7–12 or speak to principal in year 11
- PDHPE – from year 7–10
- Science – from year 7–10
- Technology and Applied Studies – year 7–8
- Music – year 7–8
- Visual Arts – year 7–8
- Languages – year 7–8
- Geography – year 7–8 and 10
- History – year 7–8 and 10

Elective subjects

==== Year 8 ====
In year 8 students choose a language from the following:

- French
- Italian
- Chinese

==== Year 9 ====
In year 9 students chose four electives, two subjects that run for two years (200 hrs) and two subjects that run for one year (100 hrs). They chose from the following subjects:

- Academic Enrichment (100 or 200 hrs)
- History Elective (100 hrs only)
- Geography Elective (100 hrs only)
- Visual Arts (100 or 200 hrs)
- Photography and Digital Media (100 or 200 hrs)
- Drama (100 or 200 hrs)
- Food Technology (100 or 200 hrs)
- Design Technology (100 or 200 hrs)
- French (200 hrs only)
- Italian (200 hrs only)
- Mandarin (200 hrs only)
- Music (200 hrs only)
- Commerce (200 hrs only)
- PASS (200 hrs only)
- Creative Communication (100 hrs only)
- STEM (200 hrs only)
- Thinking and Advocacy (100 hrs only)
- Philosophy (100 hrs only)

== Library ==
The newly renovated Loreto library was opened in July 2013. The library contains over 27 000 books and resources. The library is located at the top of the Saint Joseph's (J) Block. At the 2013 Spring Fair the library raised $3 000 for their sister school in Panighatta by selling handmade book related jewellery, in a stall named 'Read-Cycled'.

== Extra curricular activities ==
=== Debating ===
Loreto currently participates in three debating competitions:

- ISDA – Each year has 1 team in year 6+
- CSDA – Each year has 1 team in year 7+
- Archdale – 2 teams from both year 7&8, One team in year 9+

=== Music ===
Students are encouraged to join musical ensembles such as the orchestra, choir, flute ensemble, concert band, stage band or chamber strings group. Private instrumental or vocal tuition as electives, is also available.

=== Sport ===
Loreto 1st VIII receiving third place medals, Head of the River, 2007

Loreto sporting teams participate in competitions run by a number of associations, including the Junior School Heads Association of Australia (JSHAA) for primary students, and the Catholic Girls' Secondary School Sports Association (CGSSSA), and Independent Girls' Schools Sporting Association (IGSSA) for those in the secondary school.

Sports offered to junior students include: Athletics, Basketball, Cricket, Cross country, Water Polo, Hockey, Netball, Rowing, Skiing, Soccer, Swimming, Tae Kwon Do, Tennis, Tildesley Shield Tennis, Volleyball and Touch football. In 2015 Loreto won the Interschools competition for Tae Kwon Do.

=== Houses ===
As with most Australian schools, Loreto has a house system to facilitate school based competitions and activities. House activities include Inter-house debating, Inter-house theatresports, athletics and swimming carnivals, music and drama festivals and other house activities. The school currently has four houses:

- Barry – Gold
- Heaton – Green
- Millson – Red
- Ward – Blue

There are a number of inter-house events during the year. These include the athletics carnival, swimming carnival, drama festival, dance night and Music Festival which is held annually at the Sydney Town Hall in June.

== Notable alumnae ==
- Tamsin Carroll – actress
- Miranda Devine – conservative columnist
- Isabel Durant – dancer and actress in Dance Academy and Mako: Island of Secrets
- Amelia Farrugia – opera singer
- Joan Hartigan – tennis player, Wimbledon finalist
- Clover Moore – Lord Mayor of Sydney
- Phoebe Tonkin – model and actress in H_{2}O: Just Add Water
- Eliza Scanlen – actress in Sharp Objects and Little Women
- Hollie Hughes – politician
- Kathryn Greiner – politician
- Tara Rigney – Olympic rower
- Francesca Hung – model and Miss Universe Australia 2018

== See also ==
- List of Catholic schools in New South Wales
- Catholic education in Australia
- Head of the River (New South Wales)
