= Tara Anglican School for Girls =

Location
- North Parramatta, Sydney, New South Wales; Australia
- 33°47′22″S 151°0′57″E

Information
- Type: Independent single-sex early learning, primary, and secondary day and boarding school
- Denomination: Anglican
- Established: 1897; 129 years ago
- Founder: Joan Waugh
- Educational authority: New South Wales Education Standards Authority
- Oversight: Diocese of Sydney
- Principal: Adele Ramsay
- Chaplain: Fiona Isaacs
- Employees: 159
- Years: Early learning and K–12
- Gender: Girls
- Enrolment: 800
- Campus type: Suburban
- Colours: Tara navy, inspire blue and white
- Athletics: Independent Girls' Schools Sporting Association
- Affiliations: Association of Heads of Independent Schools of Australia; Association of Heads of Independent Girls' Schools; Association of Heads of Independent Schools of Australia; Australian Boarding Schools' Association; Independent Primary School Heads of Australia; Alliance of Girls' Schools Australasia
- Website: tara.nsw.edu.au

Tara Anglican School for Girls (commonly referred to as Tara) is an independent Anglican single-sex, early learning, primary, secondary, day, and boarding school for girls, located in North Parramatta, a western suburb of Sydney, New South Wales, Australia.

Established in 1897, Tara has a non-selective enrolment policy and currently caters for approximately 800 students from early learning, through Kindergarten to Year 12, including 60 boarders from Year 5 to Year 12.

The school is affiliated with the Association of Heads of Independent Schools of Australia (AHISA), the Association of Heads of Independent Girls' Schools (IGSSA), the Independent Primary School Heads of Australia (IPSHA), the Australian Boarding Schools' Association, the Alliance of Girls' Schools Australasia, and is a member of the Association of Heads of Independent Girls' Schools (AHIGS).

Tara's 2010 HSC results ranked the school the number one non-selective school in Sydney's west. In the 2007 NSW Higher School Certificate, the Sydney Morning Herald named Tara the best performing independent school in Sydney’s north-west.

== History ==
The school traces its origins back to 1897, where it is thought to have started with the opening of St. Ronan's School, a Christian, co-educational, primary day school in George Street, Parramatta, by Mary Elizabeth "Joan" Waugh. In 1898, Waugh moved St. Ronan's to an already existing school, The Cedars, in Western Road, Parramatta, in partnership with its incumbent principal, Mrs. Bond. From here, in keeping with Waugh's Anglican vision, the partnership with Bond was dissolved and the school moved to St. John's Parish Hall, Parramatta, in 1902.

When Waugh's father, Isaac Waugh, died in 1912, the school moved to the family home, "Tara", in George Street, Parramatta (demolished in 1963). The name of this property had been chosen years earlier by the Waugh family who, being of Irish background, named it after the Hill of Tara, in Ireland. When Joan Waugh's mother died in 1926, the Tara home was sold, and Tara opened in larger premises at Hassall Street, Parramatta. This was to be Tara's home for the next twenty years and the final move for Joan Waugh. When she died in 1946, the school came under the protection of the Church of England in Australia. All Saints' Church Hall was to be Tara's next home. It is here that it is said that without the help of Paddy Walker and the active participation of a group of parents, the school would not have survived.

On 6 February 1952, 142 junior school boys and girls moved from All Saints', and began school at "Ellangowan", at 153 George Street, Parramatta. In 1953, the school commenced classes for senior school pupils. At this site, Tara grew rapidly, and thus it was determined that another larger premises was required. In Term 3 of 1958, 103 senior school girls commenced at the school's current site at Masons Drive, with a new Headmistress, Helen Claridge. This site had previously been The Smith Family Hospital for Children with Rheumatic Fever. A new Science Block was added in 1959; a library in 1962, and the swimming pool in 1965. Construction of the Tara Junior School, and the first floor extension to the main block commenced in 1969. The girls from the Junior School moved to the Masons Drive buildings late in 1970. Ellangowan was sold in 1969 to fund the construction.

Major building construction has occurred almost every year; Science and Technology facilities, a Gymnasium and Music Block, Boarding facilities, Cafeteria and Function Area, Senior Learning Centre, a new Junior School Library and Technology Centre, and in 2023, a new Aquatic Centre and Sports Precinct. The school also runs a Telescope, given to Tara by Katherine Blundell, a professor at the University of Oxford. A team called the Space Odyssey Team is run in conjunction with the telescope, bringing girls and boys all over Sydney to join the team and participate in the program.

== Principals ==
Period	Details
1897–1946	Joan Waugh
1946–1950	Jessie "Joy" Hall Young
1950	Olga Phelps Wilson
1950–1959	Nancy "Katharine" Buck
1959–1971	Helen Claridge
1971–1973	Margaret Macdonald
1974–1979	Joy Parker
1980 – May 1999	Ruth Shatford
May – December 1999	Norma Boston (acting)
2000–2008	Carol Bowern
2009–2023	Susan Middlebrook
2024–present	Adele Ramsay

== House system ==
Tara currently has four houses and all students and staff take part in a variety of house activities including academic challenges, debating, drama, team sports, choir, service to others, outdoor education and leadership. The Houses are named after women and men who have made a significant contribution to the life of the school.

Crawford
The Reverend Doug Crawford, rector of All Saints' Parramatta, chaplain at Tara, former member of the school council, instrumental in relocating Tara to Mason's Drive. This house is traditionally symbolised by the colour purple.
Hake
Elizabeth Hake, wife of the headmaster at The King’s School, former member of the school council, instrumental in relocating Tara to Mason's Drive. This house is traditionally symbolised by the colour yellow.
Walker
The Reverend Paddy Walker, rector of All Saints' Parramatta, former member of the school council, welcomed Tara to use his church hall when no other accommodation was available. This house is traditionally symbolised by the colour green.
Waugh
Mary Elizabeth "Joan" Waugh, long regarded as Tara’s founder, who lived with her family at their home, "Tara", in Parramatta. The house is traditionally symbolized by the colour red.

== Notable alumnae ==
The alumnae of Tara are known as Old Girls and may elect to join the school's alumnae association, the Tara Old Girls' Association Inc. Some notable Tara Old Girls include:

Law

- the Hon. Jane Needham, Judge of the Federal Court of Australia President of the NSW Bar Association 2014–2015, Woman Barrister of the Year (Australia) 2015

Media, entertainment and the arts

- Jenna McDougall – lead singer of Sydney pop punk band Tonight Alive
- Rebel Wilson – actress, writer and stand-up comedian known for her roles in the television series Pizza and Bogan Pride and the films Bridesmaids, Bachelorette and Pitch Perfect

Sport

- Kate Bates – a track cyclist; world champion (also attended Presbyterian Ladies' College, Sydney)
- Simone Kennedy – a track and road cyclist; silver medalist in women's individual pursuit C1–3 2012 Paralympics

== See also ==
- List of non-government schools in New South Wales
- List of boarding schools in Australia
