= Nicole Ng =

Australian diver

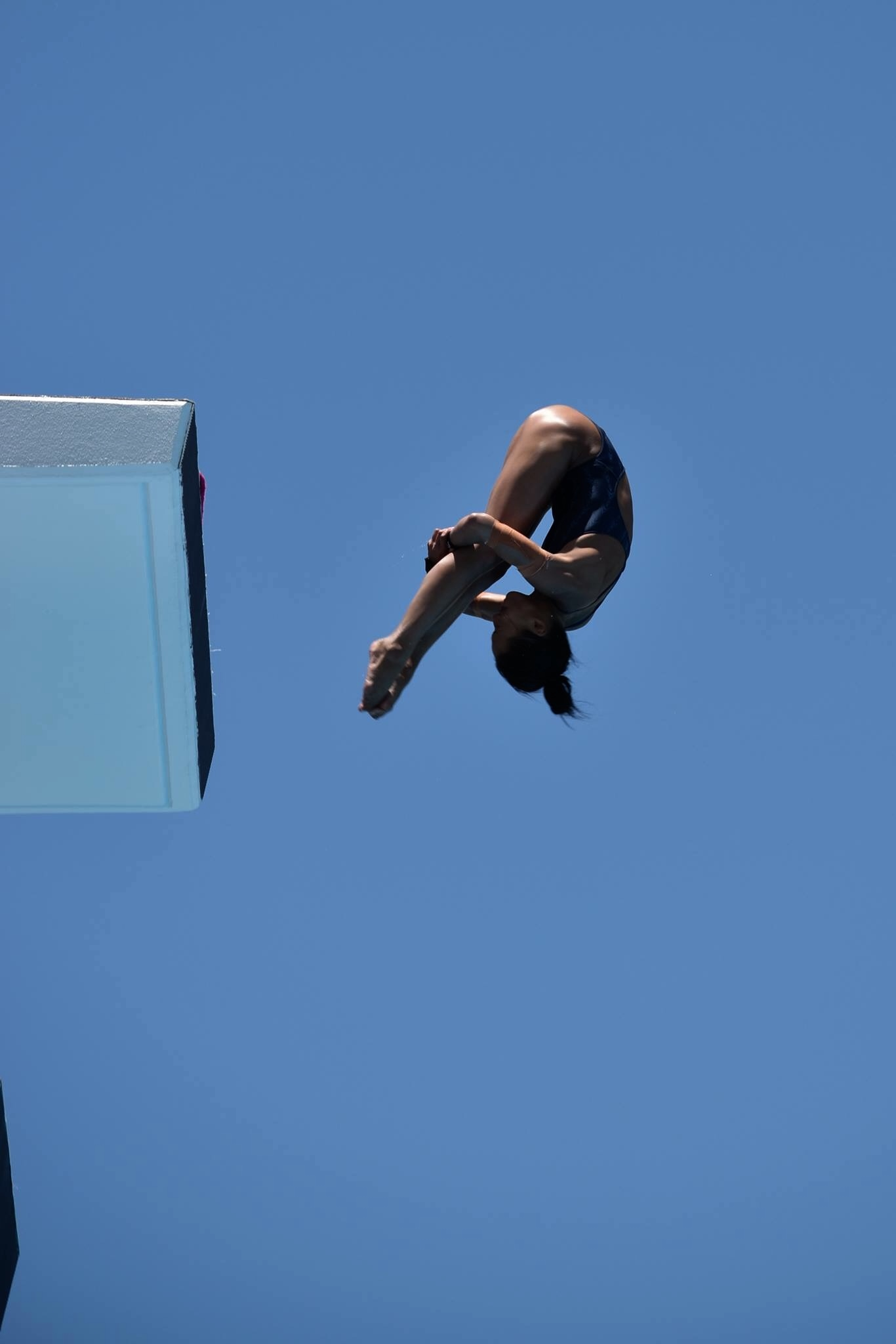

Personal information
- Nationality: Australian
- Born: 26 August Sydney
- Height: 161 cm (5 ft 3 in)

Sport
- Sport: Diving
- Events: 10 meter Platform Diving, 10 meter Synchronised Diving
- Coached by: Hui Tong, Chen Xiangning, Ming Gong
Medal record
Bronze China International, Chenzhou 2005

Nicole Monique Ng (born 26 August) is an Australian diver. Ng was also a former gymnast.

Nicole was selected to represent Australia at the 2004 World Cup, Athens. Nicole was the youngest diver on the Australian Diving team at the time. She was a 10-meter platform diver. At the 2004 Australian Olympic trials, Ng placed third to Loudy Wiggins and Chantelle Newbery.

Nicole earned her first international medal at the 2005 China international, Chenzhou. She represented Australia for eight years and was selected to compete at multiple FINA Diving Grand Prix competitions. Ng held a scholarship at the Australian institute of Sports and completed a Bachelor Science at Griffith University whilst training.

Nicole made a come back to sport at the 2018 Commonwealth Games trials, Gold Coast, Australia. Ng made the finals on the Womens’s 10 meter platform.

Nicole is a Medical Science Liaison, Neuroscience within the medical industry.

Personal life

Nicole’s, elder brother was also an Australian Representative for Men’s Gymnastics. Justin Ng, was also an Australian Institute of Sports scholarship holder and represented Australia for over 10 years. Justin is a Commonwealth Bronze Medalist.

Ng’s grandfather was a tennis player and competed in the Davis cup.
