= Roseville College =

Independent girls' school on Sydney's North Shore in New South Wales, Australia

Location
- Roseville, Sydney; Australia
- Coordinates: 33°47′4″S 151°10′57″E

Information
- Type: Independent, single-sex, day school
- Motto: Latin: Veritas omnia vincit (Truth Conquers All)
- Denomination: Anglican
- Established: 1908
- Principal: Deb Magill
- Teaching staff: 112.1 FTE (2025)
- Employees: 160.3 FTE (2025)
- Grades: K–12
- Gender: Girls
- Enrolment: 1060 (2025)
- Colours: maroon and sandstone
- Website: www.roseville.nsw.edu.au

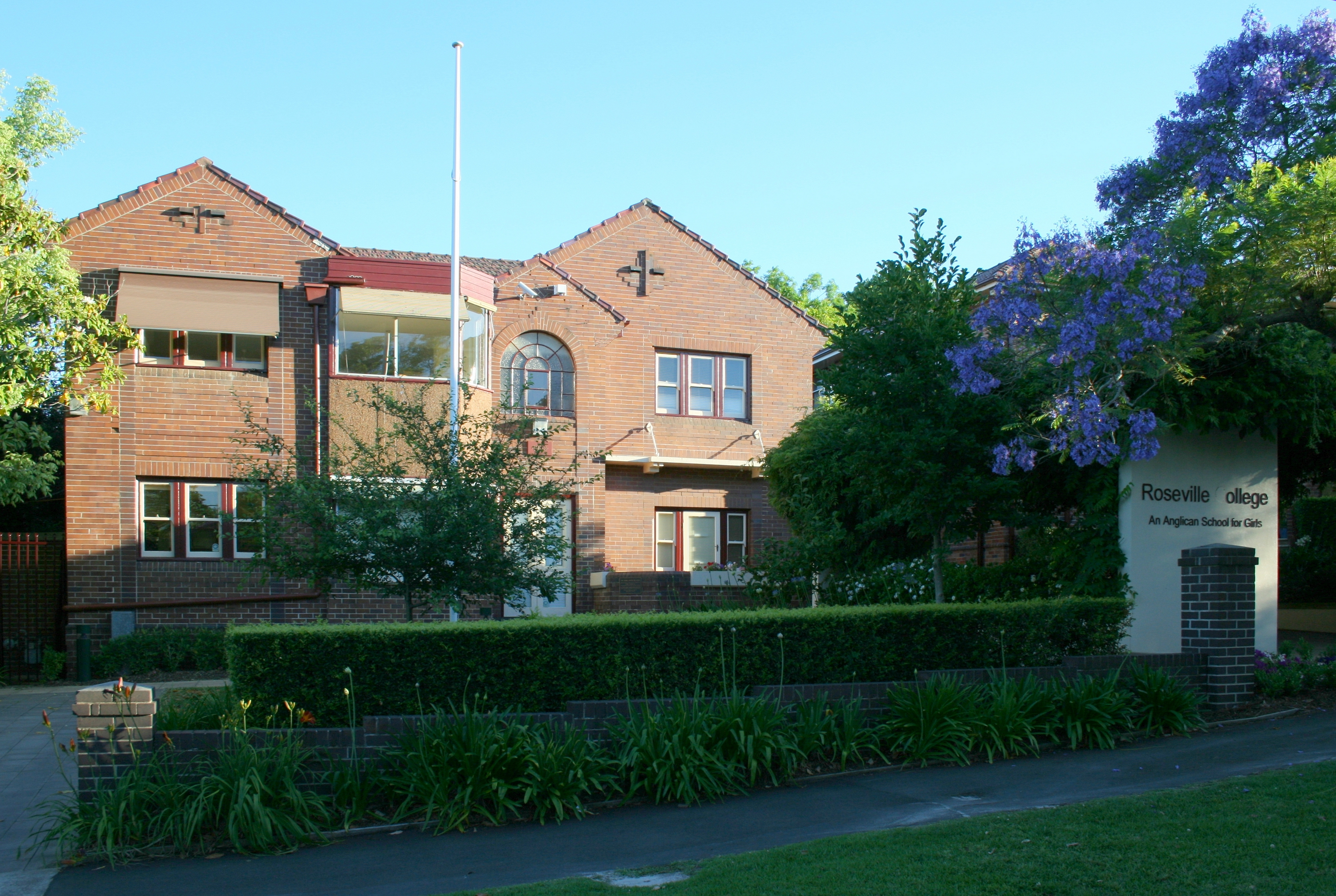
Roseville College entrance

Roseville College is a private Anglican day school for girls, located in the suburb of Roseville on Sydney's North Shore, in New South Wales, Australia.

The college was established in 1908 by Isobel Davies and has been a member school of The Anglican Schools Corporation since 1967. Roseville has a non-selective enrolment policy and as of 2025, it caters to 1060 students from kindergarten to grade 12.

The College is affiliated with the Association of Heads of Independent Schools of Australia (AHISA), the Junior School Heads Association of Australia (JSHAA), the Alliance of Girls' Schools Australasia (AGSA), and is a member of the Association of Heads of Independent Girls' Schools (AHIGS).

== History ==
Roseville College was founded in 1908 on its current site in Roseville by Isobel Davies, the daughter of a retired Welsh clergyman. The school started with just seven pupils in a cottage known as "Hinemoea", adjacent to a small playing field.

== Principals ==
Period	Details
1908–1947	Isobel Davies, Founder
1947–1952	Cynthia Rogers
1952–1958	Edna Horner
1959–1972	Mavis Honey
1973–1984	Mary Richardson
1985–1999	Joy Yeo
2000–2006	Elaine Collin
2006–2011	Briony Scott
2011–2016	Megan Krimmer
2016–2024	Deborah Magill
2025–2025	Susan Middlebrook (Interim Principal)
2026–	Michelle Walker

== Academic ==
The school's graduates are recipients of grading and certification under the Higher School Certificate (HSC). Girls in Kindergarten to Year 6 participate in the International Baccalaureate (IB) Primary Years Program. A range of scholarships are offered for Senior girls in the areas of academics, music and all-round achievement.

2021 | 57% of students achieved an Australian Tertiary Admission Rank (ATAR) of 90.00 or above, including first in state for food technology and three fourth in State in Japanese Continuers, Japanese Extension and English Advanced. Six Premier's Awards were awarded and, in ten courses, 100% of HSC candidates achieved Bands 5–6.

2020 | 63% of students achieved an ATAR of 90.00 or above, with a success rate of 95% for university early admission offers from five leading universities, including 61% in STEM-related fields. The Class of 2020 included first and second in State for Food Technology. In 17 courses, the Class achieved upwards of 30% more Bands 5–6 than the state average*.

2019 | 78% of the college's graduating class were offered a place at the university before completing the HSC, and 58% of students achieved an ATAR of 90.00 or above. Overall, 58% of the Class of 2019 achieved an ATAR or 90.00 or above, with more than a third scoring an ATAR of 95.00 and above, and five students awarded Premier's Awards*.

2018 | 56% of the Year 12 cohort achieved an ATAR of 90.00 or above, with five Premier's Award recipients and two First in State places. More than 80% of total applications to Early Entry university Leadership Programs were successful, with 97% offered – and accepting a place; more than half the cohort pursued STEAM-related disciplines*.

2017 | Roseville College was ranked 36th in the State in the merit list of top schools, 56% of students achieved an ATAR of 90 or above, 28% received an ATAR of 95 or above, and 68% of the cohort were offered a place at university prior to completing the HSC*.

Cambridge International Courses

Roseville College is the only school on Sydney's North Shore offering Cambridge International qualifications. The Cambridge International Courses in Physical Science, Global Perspectives and Sociology are offered to Years 9 and 10 students as part of Roseville College's Senior curriculum. Consistently, more than 50% of candidates achieved an A or A+ result in the final examinations.

== Associated schools ==
Roseville College is a member of The Anglican Schools Corporation.

The College is affiliated with the Association of Heads of Independent Schools of Australia (AHISA), the Junior School Heads Association of Australia (JSHAA), the Alliance of Girls' Schools Australasia (AGSA), and is a member of the Association of Heads of Independent Girls' Schools (AHIGS).

Japan: The college has enjoyed a 30+ year partnership with Bunka High School, where delegations of students and teachers collaborate to provide language enrichment and cultural exchange in a reciprocal travel experience.

United Kingdom: The college's international exchange partnerships with Gresham's School in Norfolk and Sutton Valence School in Kent, operate annually. Through reciprocal hosting, students live and learn in a different country alongside another girl, while both develop personally to gain an understanding and tolerance of another culture.

New Zealand: The college's international exchange partnership with Waikato Diocesan School for Girls in Hamilton operates annually. Through reciprocal hosting, student take turns to live and learn alongside another girl in her country of origin, while both develop personally to gain an understanding and tolerance of the other's culture.

Tanzania: The college has an ongoing relationship with Shalom (co-educational) Junior School and Bunda Girls Secondary School through fundraising and cultural engagement opportunities.

== Notable alumni ==
- Diane Purkiss, author, editor, fellow and tutor of English at Keble College, Oxford (also attended Our Lady of the Rosary Convent and Stuartholme School)
- Michelle Cox, Class of 2009. Cox first represented Australia in softball at 18-years of age, winning bronze at the 2012 World Championships. She became an Australian Olympian at the 2020 Tokyo games, scoring Australia's first run in the competition. She also has a degree in accounting from San Jose State University, California, earning Academic All-WAC and first-team All-WAC honours.
- Mollie Dive, Australian cricketer

== See also ==
- List of non-government schools in New South Wales
