= Independent Girls Schools Sports Association (Western Australia) =

- Headquarters: Brigadoon, Western Australia
- Members: 8 member schools
- Official language: English

The Independent Girls Schools Sports Association (Western Australia), or IGSSA (WA), is an interschool school sports organisation for private girls' schools in Western Australia. It was established in 1963 as the Independent Girls Schools Sports Association (Perth). IGSSA provides member schools with the opportunity to compete in a variety of sporting and cultural activities.

== History ==
The association was launched with the inaugural Athletics Carnival at Perry Lakes Stadium in 1963. This was followed by the first Interschool Swimming Meet in 1965 at Beatty Park Aquatics Centre. In 1967, IGSA drew up a constitution for the Independent Girls’ Schools Athletics Association. The aim was to organise interschool sporting fixtures, in which member schools of the Association of Principals of Independent Girls Schools Western Australia were participants, and to establish necessary financial arrangements. In the same year, the schools renamed themselves the Independent Girls Schools Sportsmistresses Association.

A review was held of IGSA sport in 1985. Subsequently the name was changed to the Independent Girls Schools Sports Association (Western Australia).

== Current member schools ==
Crest	School	Location	Enrolment	Founded	Denomination	Day/Boarding	School Colors
	Iona Presentation College	Mosman Park	850	1907	Roman Catholic	Day & Boarding	Pale blue, navy and gold
	Methodist Ladies' College	Claremont	1070	1907	Uniting Church	Day & Boarding	Lime and purple
	Penrhos College	Como	1180	1952	Uniting Church	Day & Boarding	Dark green and light gold
	Perth College	Mount Lawley	1000	1902	Anglican	Day & Boarding	Navy, violet and white
	Presbyterian Ladies' College	Peppermint Grove	1100	1915	Uniting Church	Day & Boarding	White, dark green and navy
	Santa Maria College	Attadale	812	1938	Roman Catholic	Day & Boarding	Red, dark green and white
	St Hilda's Anglican School for Girls	Mosman Park	1052	1896	Anglican	Day & Boarding	Light blue, gold and grey
	St Mary's Anglican Girls' School	Karrinyup	1000	1921	Anglican	Day & Boarding	Maroon, light blue and white

== Sports ==
- Rowing
- Basketball
- Hockey
- Netball
- Tennis
- Soccer
- Softball
- Volleyball
- Swimming
- Dance
- Waterpolo

== Carnivals ==
- Athletics
- Cross Country
- Swimming
