= Dunmore Lang College =

Residential college at Macquarie University

- Macquarie University
- Location: 130-134 Herring Road, North Ryde NSW, Sydney
- Coordinates: 33°46′41″S 151°06′59″E
- Motto: Enriching students’ lives; creating futures
- Established: 1972
- Named for: John Dunmore Lang
- Colours
- Principal: Alasdair Murrie-West
- Residents: 260
- Undergraduates: 230
- Postgraduates: 30
- Website: Dunmore Lang College

Dunmore Lang College is a residential college of Macquarie University in Sydney, Australia.

The college is a non-profit organisation, affiliated with the university. Established in 1972, it was named after John Dunmore Lang, the first Presbyterian clergyman in Sydney. He arrived in Australia in 1823.

An influential figure in the early history of the college was Dorothy Isabel Knox, Principal of the Presbyterian Ladies' College, Pymble, who guided community appeals for suitable accommodation for ladies. Since a site at the University of Sydney could not be found, attention turned to the then new Macquarie University.

Originally a ladies college, Dunmore Lang College soon became co-educational and in recent years a new wing was created expanding the college to accommodate about 260 students and new conference facilities. The college is fully catered and provides rooms with and without ensuites.

Dunmore Lang College is governed by a board of directors.

== Facilities ==
There are three common rooms in the college, one for general students with cable television, pool table, table tennis and couches, one common room is dedicated to senior students and one for postgraduate students. It is also utilized by the whole college when the main common room is being used by the colleges conference clients. The college also has its own library. There is also a room dedicated to Chiropractic study with a Chiropractic bed.

== Student association ==
The college's student association is known as the ADS (Association of Dunmore Lang College Students). They organise a variety of events throughout the year, including O-week and other student events in the College.

== Staff ==
Alasdair Murrie-West is the Principal of Dunmore Lang College. The college employs fourteen Resident Advisers to provide 24-hour student pastoral care. A variety of Resident Tutors are also employed to provide academic assistance.

== Sources ==
- D.W.A. Baker (1998). Preacher, Politician, Patriot: The Life of John Dunmore Lang. ISBN 0-522-84822-2. (240pp)
- B.A. Zuiddam (2006). Trouble in the Colonies, John Dunmore Lang: Troublemaker or Troubleshooter, Acta Theologica, Bloemfontein, South Africa.
