= Association of Heads of Independent Girls' Schools =

Australian organisation

Association of Heads of Independent Girls' Schools Trading as Independent Girls' Schools Association (IGSA)
- Formation: 1916
- Headquarters: North Ryde, New South Wales, Australia
- Coordinates: 33°47′S 151°8′E
- Members: 32 member schools (since 2020)
- Official language: English
- President: Mrs Megan Krimmer (Abbotsleigh)
- Subsidiaries: IGSA Sport (formerly Independent Girls' Schools Sporting Association)
- Website: www.igsa.nsw.edu.au
- Formerly called: Association of Head Mistresses of New South Wales

The Association of Heads of Independent Girls' Schools (AHIGS) is an Australian association for independent girls' schools, founded in New South Wales, Australia.

Established in 1916 as The Association of Head Mistresses of New South Wales, the Association decided to trade as Independent Girls' Schools Association (IGSA). The Association in 2022 comprised 32 member schools, enables inter-school aesthetic, cultural and sporting activities between New South Wales and the Australian Capital Territory's independent and Catholic girls' schools.

AHIGS also exists for the purpose of encouraging communication and a bond of co-operation and collegiality among independent girls' schools and their "heads", and working towards advancing the cause of the education of girls through policy development on major issues of concern. The association actively represents its members and the interests of their schools at a political level, through lobbying governments and politicians. Through AHIGS competitions, member schools and their students, are encouraged to value good sportsmanship, participation, team spirit and fairness above undue competitiveness and individualism.

Of New South Wales' fifteen female Rhodes Scholars (1904 to 2009), eight have attended an AHIGS School.

== Schools ==
=== Members ===
School	Location	Enrolment	Founded	Denomination	Day / Boarding	School colours
Abbotsleigh School for Girls	Wahroonga	1,370	1885	Anglican	Day & Boarding	
Ascham School	Edgecliff	1,000	1886	Non-denominational	Day & Boarding	
Brigidine College	St Ives	850	1954	Roman Catholic	Day	
Canberra Girls' Grammar School	Deakin	1,450	1926	Anglican	Day & Boarding	
Danebank Anglican School for Girls	Hurstville	910	1933	Anglican	Day	
Frensham School	Mittagong	300	1913	Non-denominational	Day & Boarding	
Kambala	Rose Bay	950	1887	Anglican	Day & Boarding	
Kincoppal-Rose Bay	Rose Bay	930	1882	Roman Catholic	Day & Boarding	
Loreto Kirribilli	Kirribilli	1,030	1901	Roman Catholic	Day	
Loreto Normanhurst	Normanhurst	900	1897	Roman Catholic	Day & Boarding	
Meriden	Strathfield	850	1897	Anglican	Day	
MLC School	Burwood	1,260	1886	Uniting Church	Day	
Monte Sant'Angelo Mercy College	North Sydney	1,080	1875	Roman Catholic	Day	
Mount St Benedict College	Pennant Hills	~1028	1966	Roman Catholic	Day	
New England Girls' School	Armidale	380	1895	Anglican	Day & Boarding	
Our Lady of Mercy College	Parramatta	1,030	1889	Roman Catholic	Day	
Presbyterian Ladies' College, Armidale	Armidale	400	1887	Presbyterian	Day & Boarding	
Presbyterian Ladies' College, Sydney	Croydon	1,350	1888	Presbyterian	Day & Boarding	
Pymble Ladies' College	Pymble	2,135	1916	Uniting Church	Day & Boarding	
Queenwood School for Girls	Mosman	800	1925	Non-denominational	Day	
Ravenswood School for Girls	Gordon	1,140	1901	Uniting Church	Day & Boarding	
Roseville College	Roseville	790	1908	Anglican	Day	
SCEGGS Darlinghurst	Darlinghurst	890	1895	Anglican	Day	
St Catherine's School	Waverley	910	1856	Anglican	Day & Boarding	
St Patrick's College	Campbelltown	850	1840	Roman Catholic	Day	
St Scholastica's College	Glebe					
St Vincent's College	Potts Point	680	1858	Roman Catholic	Day & Boarding	
Santa Sabina College	Strathfield	1,500	1894	Roman Catholic	Day	
Stella Maris College	Manly	900	1931	Roman Catholic	Day	
Tangara school for Girls	Cherrybrook	660	1982	Roman Catholic	Day	
Tara Anglican School for Girls	North Parramatta	1,000	1897	Anglican	Day & Boarding	
Wenona School	North Sydney	815	1886	Non-denominational	Day & Boarding	

=== Former members ===
School	Location	Denomination	Founded	Closed/Merged	Years Competed
Brighton College	Manly		1889	Closed 1960	?–1960
Calrossy Anglican School for Girls	Tamworth	Anglican	1919		
Claremont College	Randwick	Anglican	1882	Secondary school closed 1966	?–1966
Normanhurst School	Ashfield	Non-denominational	1882	Closed 1941	?–1941
Presbyterian Ladies' College	Goulburn	Presbyterian	1921	Closed 1970	1956–1966
Presbyterian Ladies' College	Orange	Presbyterian	1928	Merged 1975 with Wolaroi College to form Kinross Wolaroi School	1928–1975
Sydney Church of England Girls' Grammar School, Redlands	Cremorne	Anglican	1884	Became SCECGS Redlands in 1976	?–1975
SCEGGS Wollongong	Wollongong	Anglican	1955	Merged 1976 with The Illawarra Grammar School	1955–1976
SCEGGS Moss Vale	Moss Vale	Anglican	1906	Closed 1974	?–1974
St Clare's College	Waverley				
St Luke's Anglican School for Girls'	Dee Why	[Anglican	1961	Amalgamated 1992 with Peninsula Anglican Boys School and Roseby Preparatory School to form St Lukes Grammar School	1961–?

== History ==
At the Women's Club on 8 November 1916 a group of eight Headmistresses formed The Association of Head Mistresses of New South Wales, with Miss Edith Badham (SCEGGS Darlinghurst) elected as Foundation President.

The eight founding schools were:

- Abbotsleigh, Wahroonga
- Normanhurst School, Ashfield (no longer exists).
- Kambala, Rose Bay
- Meriden School, Strathfield
- Methodist Ladies' College, Burwood
- The Presbyterian Ladies' College, Croydon (now Presbyterian Ladies' College, Sydney)
- Ravenswood School for Girls, Gordon
- The Sydney Church of England Girls' Grammar School (now SCEGGS Darlinghurst)

Eligibility for membership was eventually offered to a further 24 girls' schools.

In 1945, a national association was formed, and AHIGS New South Wales heads served as Presidents of that organisation as follows:

- 1950–1952 Miss D. Knox (PLC Pymble)
- 1959–1962 Miss P. Bryant (Frensham)
- 1975–1978 Miss B. Chisholm (SCEGGS)
- 1985 Miss K. McCredie (Abbotsleigh).

The national organisation was disbanded on 26 August 1985 when the Association of Heads of Independent Schools of Australia was founded.

AHIGS first admitted male heads of girls' schools to membership from 1973 however, so far no male member has been elected to the position of President.

== Presidents of the New South Wales association ==
Term	President	School	Years as Principal	Notes
1950	Miss Beatrice L. Rennie	Queenwood	1931–1961	
1952	Miss Barbara Chisholm	SCEGGS Darlinghurst	1947–1977	
1955	Dorothy Whitehead	Ascham School	1949–1961	
1956	Fifi Hawthorne	Kambala	1933–1966	
1957	Kathleen Crago	Ravenswood	1932–1961	
1958–1959	Miss Ann Crocker	Brighton College, Manly	1943– 1960	
1960	Miss Faith Patterson	St Catherine's	1955–1987	
1961	Miss Edith M. Ralston	Wenona	1920–1963	
1962–1963	Miss Phyllis Bryant	Frensham	1938–1965	
1964	Mrs Isobel Humphery	SCEGGS Redlands	1946–1973	
1965	Miss Barbara Chisholm	SCEGGS Darlinghurst	1947–1977	
1966	Miss Freda L. Whitlam	PLC Croydon	1958–1976	
1967	Miss Dorothy Knox	Pymble	1936–1947	
1968	Miss Merrilee Roberts	Ascham	1961–1972	
1969	Miss Phyllis Evans	Ravenswood	1962–1985	
1970	Miss Sheila Morton	Meriden	1966–1984	
1971	Miss Faith Patterson	St Catherine's	1955–1987	
1972	Miss Joyce Gibbons	Kambala	1966–1984	
1973	Miss Violet Medway	Queenwood	1942–1982	
1974	Miss Barbara Jackson	Wenona	1967–1994	
1975	Miss Kathleen McCredie	Abbotsleigh	1970–1987	
1976	Miss Cynthia Parker	Frensham	1968–1993	
1977	Miss Barbara Chisholm	SCEGGS Darlinghurst	1947–1977	
1978	Miss Jeanette Buckham	Pymble	1967–1989	
1979	Mrs Joy Park	Tara	1974–1979	
1980	Miss Phyllis Evans	Ravenswood	1962–1985	
1981	Miss Faith Patterson	St Catherine's	1955–1987	
1982	Miss Sheila Morton	Meriden	1966–1984	
1983	Mrs Mary Richardson	Roseville College	1972–1984	
1984	Mrs Rowena Danziger	Ascham	1973–2003	
1985	Miss Kathleen McCredie	Abbotsleigh	1970–1987	
1986	Miss Cynthia Parker	Frensham	1968–1993	
1987	Miss Diana Bowman	SCEGGS Darlinghurst	1978–1996	
1988–1989	Dr Jan Milburn	NEGS	1973–1989	
1989–1991	Mrs Denise Thomas	Meriden	1985–2002	
1991–1993	Miss Diana Bowman	SCEGGS Darlinghurst	1978–1996	
1993–1995	Mrs Joy Yeo	Roseville College	1985–1999	
1995–1997	Mrs Judith Wheeldon	Abbotsleigh	1996–2004	
1997–1999	Mrs Gillian Moore	Pymble	1989–2007	
1999–2001	Miss Rosalyn Bird	Danebank	1988–2010	
2001–2003	Mrs Margaret Hadley	Wenona	1995–2007	
2003–2005	Mrs Kem Bray	Queenwood	1996–2008	
2006–2007	Mrs Margaret White	Kambala	2000–2014	
2008	Mrs Carol Bowern	Tara	2000–2008	
2009–2010	Ms Vicki Steer	Ravenswood	2005–2015	
2011–2012	Dr Briony Scott	Wenona	2011–2024	
2013–2014	Mrs Vicki Waters	Pymble	2007–2019	
2015–2016	Mrs Megan Krimmer	Roseville College	2012–2016	
2017–2020	Mrs Susan Middlebrook	Tara	2009-2023	
2020–2022	Dr Julie Greenhalgh	Meriden	2007–2022	
2022–2025	Ms Lisa Moloney	MLC School	2018–2025	
2026–present	Mrs Megan Krimmer	Abbotsleigh	2017-Present	

== Independent Girls' Schools Sporting Association ==
The thirty-two members' schools of AHIGS are eligible to participate and compete against each other in a number of sporting carnivals and interschool sports through IGSA Sport (formerly known as IGSSA). Secondary school girls compete in team and individual sports at school level and can be selected to represent IGSA Sport as part of the NSWCIS and All Schools sporting pathways.

== Archdale debating competition ==
The Archdale Debating Competition is a competition conducted by the Association of Heads of Independent Girls' Schools for the benefit of students from 24 of its members' schools.

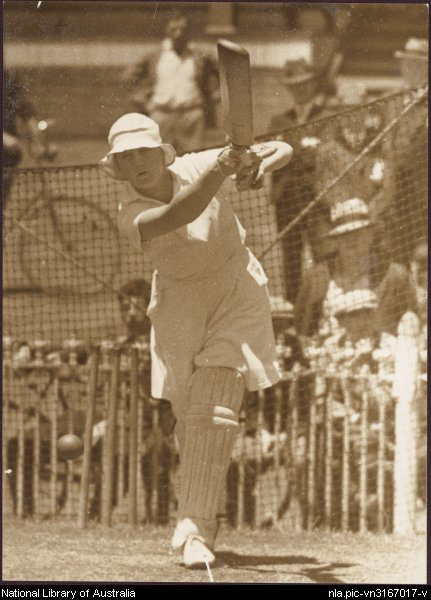
Betty Archdale (1907–2000)

Established in the early 1970s, it is an annual competition conducted over two terms (typically between March and August), with each member school entering a team into each of the divisions. The Archdale Shield is awarded to the school which performs best across the whole competition. The award is determined through an overall points score after the conclusion of the final round.

The competition is named in honour of Helen Elizabeth (Betty) Archdale (August 21, 1907–January 11, 2000), former principal of The Women's College at the University of Sydney (1946–1957), and former headmistress of Abbotsleigh (1958–1970). Betty Archdale was also a talented cricketer, captaining the English women's cricket team in 1934 and 1935. In 1944 Archdale was awarded an Order of the British Empire for her part in getting nurses out of Singapore during World War II. In 1999 she was one of the first ten women to be granted Honorary Life Membership of Marylebone Cricket Club in England. Archdale was listed as an Australian Living Treasure in 1997.

=== History ===
Although a number of AHIGS schools offered debating as an extracurricular activity from around the 1920s, it was not until the 1960s that inter-school debating became common among girls' schools.

In 1971, following a debate between Abbotsleigh and a combined high schools team, the decision was made to form a debating organisation for independent girls' schools. This organisation was called 'ISSGDA', and it was made up of sixteen independent schools (girls' and co-educational) divided into four geographic areas for competition purposes.

The first ISSGDA final was contested between Abbotsleigh and Moriah College (the only non-AHIGS school to compete) at Abbotsleigh. The trophy, which Miss Archdale had donated, was won by Abbotsleigh and presented by Miss Kathleen McCredie, the then headmistress of Abbotsleigh. From this point on, the competition became known as the 'Archdale Debating Competition'.

=== Archdale winners ===
Year	Archdale Shield	Most Improved	Seniors	Year 10	Junior	Year 9	Year 8A	Year 8B	Year 7A	Year 7B
1988	Kambala			MLC						
1989	Ravenswood			Moriah						
1990	MLC			Moriah						
1991	Kambala			Ravenswood		Pymble				
1992	Abbotsleigh			Abbotsleigh		St Catherine's				
1993	St Catherine's			Tara		Abbotsleigh				
1994	MLC			Abbotsleigh		SCEGGS			Pymble	
1995	Kambala			Kambala		Kambala			Moriah	
1996	Pymble			MLC		Tara			Tara	
1997	Pymble		Kambala	SCEGGS		Moriah			Tara	
1998	Pymble		Roseville	Pymble		SCEGGS	Pymble		Kambala	
1999	Pymble		Kambala	Kambala		Pymble	Pymble		SCEGGS	
2000	Pymble		Abbotsleigh	Pymble		PLC	Pymble		SCEGGS	
2001	SCEGGS		MLC	SCEGGS		MLC	MLC	Pymble	Tara	SCEGGS
2002	SCEGGS		Pymble	Danebank		SCEGGS	Tar]	MLC	St Catherine's	Pymble
2003	SCEGGS		MLC	Pymble		Tara	PLC	Pymble	MLC	Pymble
2004	SCEGGS		MLC	Tara		Tara	SCEGGS	Queenwood	Tara	SCEGGS
2005	Abbotsleigh		Meriden	Abbotsleigh		Abbotsleigh	SCEGGS	SCEGGS	Abbotsleigh	Loreto Kirribilli
2006	PLC Sydney		Pymble	SCEGGS		Roseville	MLC	SCEGGS	Santa	Danebank
2007	Abbotsleigh		Pymble	Tara		Pymble	Abbotsleigh	Meriden	Loreto Kirribilli	MLC
2008	Abbotsleigh		Roseville	SCEGGS		Tara	MLC	St Catherine's	Queenwood	Abbotsleigh
2009	Tara		Pymble	Tara		SCEGGS	Ascham	MLC	Roseville	Ascham
2010	SCEGGS		Tara	Tara		SCEGGS	SCEGGS	Ascham	SCEGGS	SCEGGS
2011	SCEGGS		Monte	Kambala		SCEGGS	Ascham	SCEGGS	Tara	SCEGGS
2012	Tara		MLC	Meriden		SCEGGS	Tara	Abbotsleigh	MLC	Ravenswood
2013	MLC		SCEGGS	Ascham		Meriden	St Catherine's	MLC	MLC	Kincoppal
2014	MLC		Ascham	Tara		Wenona	Meriden	MLC	Abbotsleigh	SCEGGS
2015	SCEGGS		MLC	SCEGGS		Pymble	Ravenswood	SCEGGS	Abbotsleigh	Danebank
2016	Abbotsleigh		Abbotsleigh	MLC		MLC	Abbotsleigh	SCEGGS	Kambala	Kambala
2017	MLC		MLC	SCEGGS		Wenona	Kincoppal	SCEGGS	Abbotsleigh	MLC
2018	Abbotsleigh		SCEGGS Darlinghurst	SCEGGS Darlinghurst		Abbotsleigh	Kambala	Monte Sant' Angelo	Kambala	MLC
2019	Abbotsleigh	Tara	Monte Sant’ Angelo	Kambala		Abbotsleigh	Abbotsleigh	Monte Sant' Angelo	Tara	Abbotsleigh
2020	Abbotsleigh	Queenwood School	Abbotsleigh	MLC School	Queenwood School	Abbotsleigh	Ascham	SCEGGS Darlinghurst	Pymble Ladies’ College	SCEGGS Darlinghurst
2021	SCEGGS Darlinghurst	Santa Sabina	Kambala	Queenwood School	Queenwood School	Ascham	PLC Sydney	SCEGGS Darlinghurst	MLC School	Pymble Ladies’ College
2022	MLC School	Ravenswood	Abbotsleigh	Ravenswood	SCEGGS Darlinghurst	MLC School	Kambala	MLC School	Queenwood	Meriden
2023	Abbotsleigh	Abbotsleigh, St Vincent's College & Tara	SCEGGS Darlinghurst	Abbotsleigh	Wenona	Abbotsleigh	Kambala	Meriden	Roseville	Abbotsleigh
2024	MLC School	Monte Sant' Angelo	SCEGGS Darlinghurst	Abbotsleigh	SCEGGS Darlinghurst	Monte San' Angelo	Meriden	Meriden	Kambala	Queenwood

== Festival of Speech ==
The concept of a 'Festival of Speech' for the Association of Heads of Independent Girls' Schools was first suggested in the early 1990s by Mr. Chris Faisandier, then Principal of Kincoppal-Rose Bay and a member of AHIGS.

Formerly a Principal of Sacred Heart College in New Zealand, Faisandier was involved with the O'Shea Shield Competition in which about twenty schools from the lower North Island of New Zealand participated.

The purpose of the O'Shea Shield Competition was to encourage students to develop skills in the areas of public speaking, debating, analysis and rhetoric. So popular was the competition and so high was the standard of presentation, that the winners of the O'Shea Shield were often featured on New Zealand television.

With the support of the AHIGS membership, Mr Faisandier established the Festival of Speech (then known as the Independent Girls Schools Speaking Competition) in NSW in 1996. The inaugural Festival, spanning Friday evening and all day Saturday, was hosted by Kincoppal-Rose Bay, won by Roseville College, and attended by fifteen schools.

Today the Festival continues to be hosted annually by an AHIGS member school, and some thirty-two schools now participate. Students have the opportunity to perform in the areas of drama, debating, poetry, prose readings, current affairs and religious and ethical questions. The Festival is open to girls from AHIGS schools in years seven to eleven.

=== Winning schools ===
Year	Overall Champion
1996	Roseville
1997	PLC Sydney
1998	PLC Sydney
1999	PLC Sydney
2000	PLC Sydney
2001	PLC Sydney
2002	PLC Sydney
2003	PLC Sydney
2004	PLC Sydney
2005	PLC Sydney
2006	PLC Sydney
2007	Kambala
2008	PLC Sydney
2009	SCEGGS Darlinghurst
2010	SCEGGS
2011	PLC Sydney
2012	SCEGGS
2013	SCEGGS
2014	SCEGGS
2015	PLC Sydney
2016	Ravenswood
2017	PLC Sydney
2018	Pymble
2019	SCEGGS
2020	PLC Sydney
2021	PLC Sydney
2022	PLC Sydney
2023	PLC Sydney
2024	PLC Sydney
2025	PLC Sydney

== See also ==
- List of non-government schools in New South Wales
