= Dorothy Knox =

Australian headmistress (1902–1983)

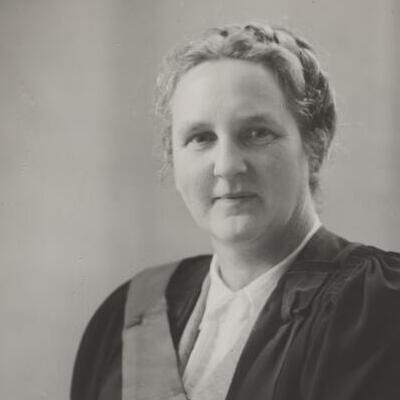
- in about 1940
- Born: Dorothy Isabel Knox; 27 August 1902; Benalla
- Died: 7 November 1983 (aged 81); Terrey Hills
- Education: Janet Clarke Hall at Melbourne University
- Employer: Presbyterian Ladies' College at Pymble
- Predecessor: Nancy Jobson to 1933
- Successor: Jeanette Buckham

Dorothy Isabel Knox OBE AM (27 August 1902 – 7 November 1983) was an Australian headmistress. She led what became Pymble Ladies College and she inspired the creation of Dunmore Lang College at Macquarie University.

== Life ==
Knox was born in 1902 in Benalla. Her parents were Robina Dewar (born Brodie) and Edward Knox. Her father managed a factory and she was the last of their three children. She was a natural student and she was educated at several schools before she matriculated from Melbourne High School. She went on to stay at Janet Clarke Hall and attend under-grad and post-graduate studies at Melbourne University. In 1925 she was awarded a master's degree.

She became the head of the Presbyterian Ladies’ College, Orange in 1932.

In July 1936 Knox became the Principal of Presbyterian Ladies' College at Pymble. The previous head was Grace Mackintosh who had been the unsuccessful replacement for Nancy Jobson who had expanded the college.

Knox was appointed an Officer of the Order of the British Empire (OBE) in 1958. Knox was at the college until she retired in 1967 having overseen the expansion of the school during her leadership. During Knox's final year the Wyndham scheme was introduced that restructured secondary education and encouraged comprehensive education in New South Wales. Knox approved of the changes.

Know guided community appeals for suitable accommodation for ladies attending university. Her first choice was a new women's college at the University of Sydney but grounds could not be found. The attention of her committee turned to the new Macquarie University. The new college was established in 1972 and named after John Dunmore Lang, the first Presbyterian clergyman in Sydney.

== Death and legacy ==
Knox was made an AM in 1980. She publisher her auto-biography Time Flies in 1982. She died in Terrey Hills in New South Wales in 1983. Margaret Coleman later wrote her biography.
