= Margaret Peden =

Australian cricketer

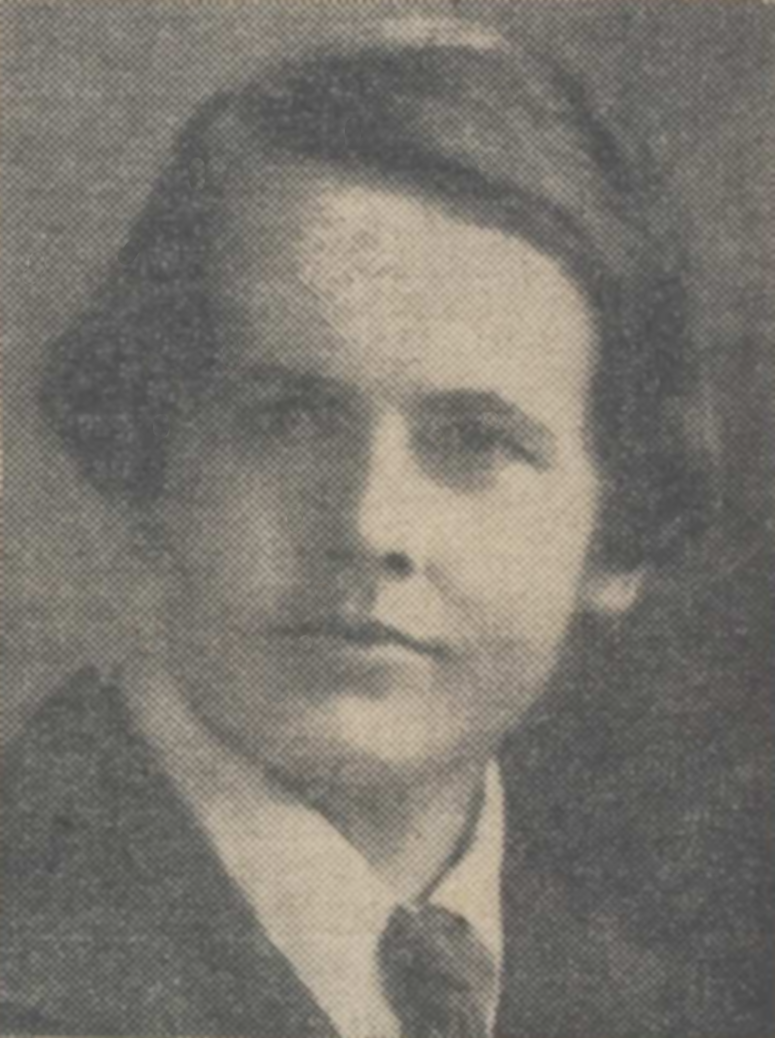

Personal information
- Born: 18 October 1905; Chatswood, New South Wales
- Died: 18 March 1981 (aged 75); Sydney, New South Wales
- Batting: Right-handed

International information
- National side: Australia
- Test debut (cap 1): 28 December 1934 v England
- Last Test: 10 July 1937 v England

Career statistics
Competition	Test
Matches	6
Runs scored	87
Batting average	8.70
100s/50s	0/0
Top score	34
Catches/stumpings	0/–
- Source: Cricinfo, 22 February 2015

Margaret Elizabeth Maynard Peden (18 October 1905 – 18 March 1981) was an Australian international cricketer. She played six women's test matches for the Australia women's cricket team in the 1930s, and was the first Australian women's Test captain. Her sister Barbara Peden also played for Australia.

== Early life ==
Peden was born on 18 October 1905 in Chatswood, New South Wales. She was the daughter of Margaret Ethel (née Maynard) and John Beverley Peden; her father was a professor of law.

Peden played backyard cricket as a child and achieved recognition in sports while attending school at Abbotsleigh, being noted as one of the school's best tennis players in 1921. She also captained her school's cricket team and at her direction the girls side began bowling overarm rather than underarm. After school she studied a Bachelor of Arts at Sydney University and represented the university in hockey, and established a women's cricket team, and as of 1930 she had graduated and had begun working as sports mistress of Redlands School.

== Developing women's cricket ==
In 1928 Peden helped found a Women's Cricket Association for New South Wales and was named the inaugural honorary secretary of the body. In April 1930 she was selected as Captain of a New South Wales side which was to play a Victorian women's side in what were the first women's games played between the states in a decade. She was described as bowling a "deadly ball" ahead of the series, and in addition to captaining her State she was also responsible for managing the organization of the matches themselves which she found took up the majority of her time. In July 1930 Peden stated that interest in participating in women's cricket in Australia was rapidly increasing, reporting that there were 250 women's cricketers in New South Wales, 200 in Queensland, 50 in Victoria, and an Association forming in South Australia, and she said in an interview

"Matches will soon be played between these four States and also with teams from N.Z.. We share the English women cricketers' viewpoint that our cricket should be kept entirely apart from men, but we hope that before long Australia will send a women's test team to bring back the ashes from England."

In March 1931 the All Australia Council for women's cricket was formed and the first women's interstate Cricket Carnival, modelled on the Sheffield Shield, was organized and Peden was credited with the formation of the body as she had encouraged the Queensland and Victorian women's Associations to support the initiative. In October 1931 the NSW Women's Cricket Association voted to allow women's cricketers to wear trousers rather than having to wear skirts when playing, however Peden had opposed the change due to the reasoning that many women's grounds did not have changerooms to allow the cricketers to change from a skirt to trousers for the games.

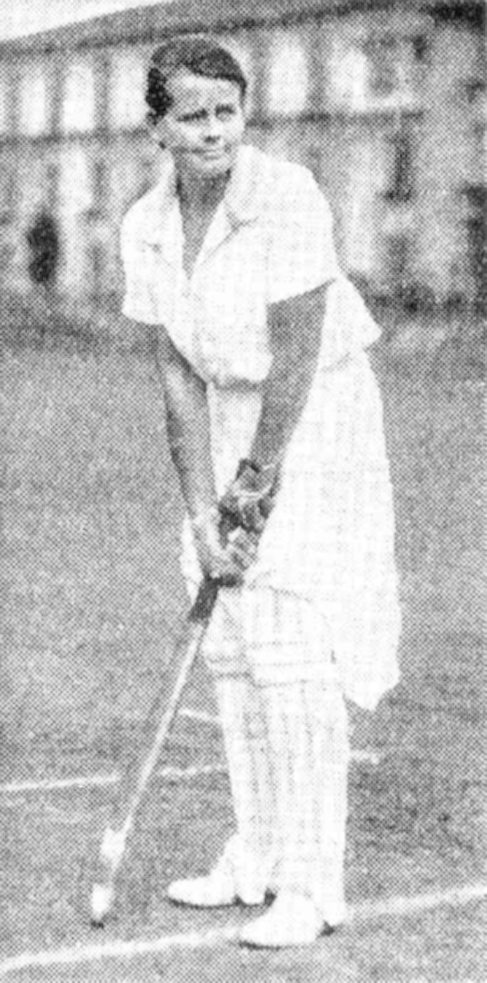
Peden batting, 1934.

In February 1932 Peden, still serving as secretary of the NSW Association and captain of the NSW women's team, invited a Doctor to deliver a lecture to the side on the importance of a healthy diet, and she captained the side to its second interstate Premiership that year. She was elected honorary secretary of the national Australian Women's Cricket Association for 1932. She became involved in a minor controversy that year because as of March 1932 skirts were again required in women's cricket accompanied with white stockings fully covering legs, and that month the South Sydney women's side was disqualified by the NSW Association after winning the state second grade competition for breaching this protocol, with Peden defending the decision claiming that the side had been properly warned before being disqualified, but the captain of the side claimed that they had only played with bare legs once and desisted after being warned.

== Working towards international women's cricket ==
In July 1932 she announced that the Australia women's cricket Council had received a letter from the All-England Women's Cricket Council expressing hopes for international matches to commence in 1934, and she also reported that there were 70 clubs in New South Wales with 1000 active women's cricketers. As of November 1932 she was also serving as a New South Wales state selector, in addition to All-Australia Council and NSW Association secretary and NSW captain, and in 1932 she also helped cofound the NSW Women's Amateur Sports Council which was a body which aimed to centrally administrate all women's sport in the state.

In February 1933 Peden began efforts to organize for a New Zealand women's team to participate in the 1934 Australian women's interstate tournament, a move which was seen as aiming to help the states prepare for a tour by an English side. She captained NSW for the third time at the interstate tournament in 1933 and they won the Premiership for the third time running. In May 1933 she expressed doubts that the All-Australia Council could afford to fund an English tour on the prospect of England visiting in 1934, and expressed that it would be better to focus on hosting New Zealand first. In September 1933 she reported that New Zealand was going to participate in the 1934 women's interstate Carnival in February, and that she felt that an England tour could not take place until the 1934/35 season. She expressed that she felt it was likely there would be some Maori women in the New Zealand side as she felt they would be "cricketers of quality", and in November she proposed that games against club sides be organized for the New Zealand side so they could get into form in order to play an Australian XI. In December she became engaged to Ranald Emanuel, a noteworthy tennis player. She attempted to organize a year book for women's cricket for 1933 but was unable to find support.

Peden was again selected as New South Wales captain for the 1934 interstate carnival, and was described as an all-rounder. In March 1934 the Australian women's cricket Association felt they were ready and invited the English Association to send a team to visit Australia proposing that the side play each Australian state team and then one 'Test' match against a combined Australian XI, however a reply was received which said that calling an Australian/English match a 'Test' would be an "absurdity". Commenting on the reply Peden said:

"There are many people in England who criticise women for playing cricket . . . I think the Australian girls are of a high enough standard to give the English girls a good go for it, and I can see no reason why the match should not be called a test . . . The cable from England describing the Test as an 'absurdity,' is probably actuated by spite by a certain section of the English people. However, English girls have received a lot of help from the international, A. E. R. Gilligan, and during their winter net practice Strudwick and Sandham help the girls all they can."

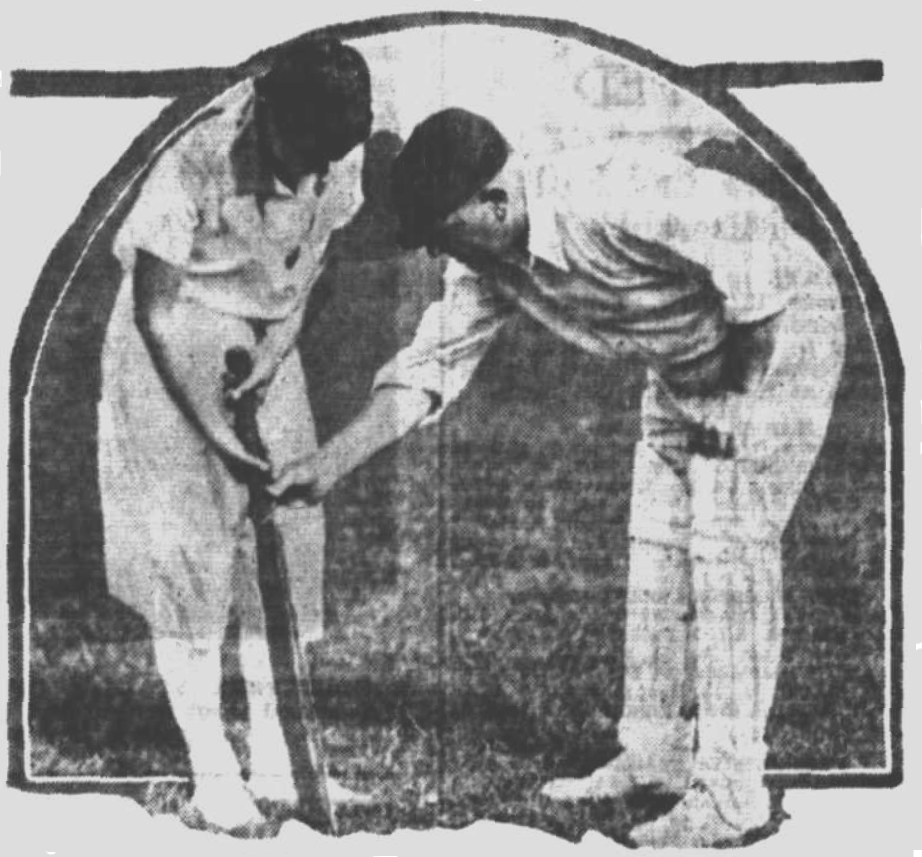
Charlie Macartney showing Margaret Peden a batting grip, 1934.

Nonetheless, the English women's Association accepted the invitation and the tour was scheduled for December 1934, and Peden organized meetings with local clubs across New South Wales to canvas suggestions for the upcoming tour. She achieved commendation for her play on the field in late March 1934 when she scored 59 for Kuring-gai in women's club cricket in an innings which included four fours. In April several matches between New South Wales and combined club sides were organized to raise funds for the England tour with the first being a match between New South Wales and a combined XI from the Kuring-gai, university, and Oldfields clubs, with Peden playing against New South Wales for the combined side, but she returned to the New South Wales captaincy for matches against other combined club teams. She organized a cricket revue in June 1934 also for the purpose of raising funds for the tour. In July a cable was received from London ordering that women must wear white stockings in matches during the tour, and Peden commented that this was unnecessary since it was already the policy of the New South Wales Association. In August she represented NSW at a meeting of the Australian Women's Cricket Council in Brisbane held to determine how the Australian side to play England would be selected, helped women's cricketers from the Sydney North Shore to organize a concert to raise funds for the England tour, and was officially appointed to a committee to arrange the programme of the English side in New South Wales. Also in August she attended the opening of the first women's cricket coaching school and was credited as being personally responsible for New South Wales being the first state to be able to open a women's school.

In September 1934 the women's cricket season opened with a special match to raise funds for the England tour with the Kuring-gai women's club, captained by Peden, playing a men's "Father's and Friends" team captained by Charlie Macartney, with Peden's side winning. The same month she represented New South Wales at the All-Australia Women's Cricket Council meeting in Brisbane at which it was announced that there were to be three 'Tests' in the England series. In late September she began writing a series of cricket coaching articles for The Daily Telegraph. In October she captained a women students team in a match against the male staff of the University of Sydney held to raise funds for the England tour, and a report in October noted she was in excellent form with the bat and would likely captain New South Wales in the states game against England. In November she captained a combined Sydney Metropolitan side which visited Wollongong to play a match against a Wollongong XI. Also in November it was proposed that numbers be worn on uniforms for the England tour, however Peden rejected the idea arguing that the scoreboard would enable players to be identified and also reasoning that cricket was a team sport with a focus on individuals being best avoided.

== First women's Test series ==
In November 1934 the English women's team arrived in Australia in Fremantle, Western Australia and Peden greeted the side when they arrived in Melbourne representing New South Wales alongside representatives of the Queensland and Victorian women's cricket Associations, and she was selected as Captain of the New South Wales side to play England in late November with a report noting she had improved remarkably over the 1934/35 season and merited selection on her play as well as her cricket knowledge. In early December she visited Leeton and presented the New South Wales women's state uniforms and offered some coaching to the Leeton women's cricket team, and joined the England touring party in Deniliquin to take up her role as liaison officer to the side. It was suggested in December that she was likely to be selected to captain Australia in the Tests due to her knowledge of the sport and her proven leadership. After returning to Sydney Peden remarked that the English players were much better stroke makers than the Australians, although she felt their timing was poor due to Australian wickets being faster than English ones, but that they would not be at their best until later in the tour.

The English XI arrived in Sydney in December and Peden met with the side when they arrived and escorted them to the Women's College at Sydney College where they stayed during their visit, and she assisted with receiving guests at the official reception held at the Hotel Australia. The English played New South Wales in a two-day game on the 14 and 15 December. Peden captained NSW and she was in a position to secure a draw, but decided instead to declare NSW innings leaving the English half an hour to score 57 runs which they did successfully. She received praise for her sporting declaration. After the match she helped host a beach picnic for the English side.

== Personal life ==
Peden was raised by her mother as an adherent of Christian Science. Her England counterpart Betty Archdale was also a Christian Scientist and their mothers had previously corresponded. The 1934–35 English tour of Australia originated when Peden asked her sister Barbara – then working in England as an architect – to contact Archdale and invite her to lead the tour. Peden and Archdale remained friends long after their playing careers.

In 1935, Peden married Maurice Ranald Emanuel, who changed his surname to "Peden" by deed poll shortly before their wedding. They had one son together and adopted a daughter. She died on 18 March 1981 in Roseville, New South Wales, aged 75.
