= EWF =

EWF may refer to:

- Earth, Wind & Fire, an American funk band
- Education World Forum, an international education seminar
- Empire Wrestling Federation, an American wrestling promotion
- Engineers Without Frontiers
- Enhanced Write Filter, a component of some of Microsoft's embedded operating systems
- Ethiopian World Federation
- European Weightlifting Federation
- European Federation for Welding, Joining and Cutting, a trade organization
- Every Woman Foundation
- Expert Witness Compression Format, an open file format to store disk images
