= Barbara Peden =

Australian cricketer

Cricket information
- Batting: Right-handed
- Bowling: Right arm medium pace

International information
- National side: Australia
- Test debut: 4 January 1935 v England
- Last Test: 26 June 1937 v England

Career statistics
Competition	WTests
Matches	4
Runs scored	94
Batting average	13.42
100s/50s	0/0
Top score	33
Balls bowled	120
Wickets	1
Bowling average	50.00
5 wickets in innings	0
10 wickets in match	0
Best bowling	1/9
Catches/stumpings	2/–
- Source: CricInfo, 6 December 2014

Barbara Peden (born 2 August 1907 in Chatswood, New South Wales – died 31 July 1984 in Sydney, New South Wales) was an Australian cricket player. Peden played four test matches for the Australia national women's cricket team alongside her sister Margaret Peden, who captained the team.

Peden was an architect outside of her cricket career. She and her sister Margaret were adherents of Christian Science, as was inaugural England captain Betty Archdale; their mothers had previously corresponded. The inaugural English tour of Australia was initiated by Margaret, who asked Barbara – then working in England – to contact Archdale and suggest that she organise an England team.
