= Gladys Gordon Everett =

New Zealand born headmistress

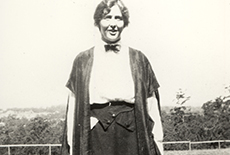
- Born: 6 May 1888; Nelson
- Died: 18 June 1971 (aged 83); Soviet Union
- Education: Nelson College for Girls; Victoria University College
- Known for: head of Abbotsleigh private school for over twenty years
- Predecessor: Dorothea Poole
- Successor: Ruth Hirst

Gladys Gordon Everett MBE known as Miss Gordon Everett (6 May 1888 – 18 June 1971) was a New Zealand born headmistress. She led the Abbotsleigh private school for over twenty years during a time of expansion and rising attainments.

== Life ==
Gordon Everett was born in Nelson in New Zealand in 1888. Her parents were Ada (born Gordon) and her husband Albert Everett. Her New Zealand father sold cloth and her mother was born in Australia. Her state education began at Nelson College for Girls before she went to Wellington to attend Victoria University College. She left that college with a master's degree in 1916.

in 1920 Gordon Everett replaced Dr John Marden as the head of the Presbyterian Pymble Ladies' College. near Sydney. She resigned in 1921 and Nancy Jobson replaced her as principal.

She left to study in France. She taught in France and England before she led the Katanning Church of England Girls' School.

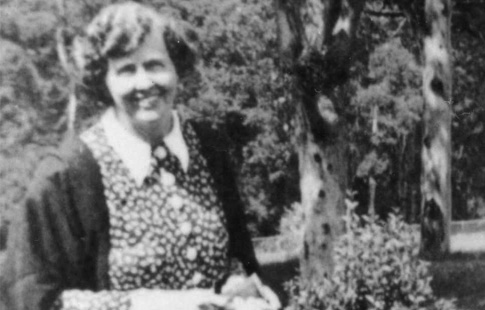
Miss Gordon Everett at Abbotsleigh

In 1930 a new headmistress was required at Abbotsleigh private school for girls in Sydney. Gordon Everett was chosen from a list of thirty candidates. She was known as "Miss Gordon Everett" and she taught lessons in Divinity and in French. In the following year, Gordon Everett began arranging the students into houses. In 1933 the school's tradition of celebrating founder's day began and the school bought land and nearby houses including Read House for the headmistress. The school's expansion plans involved more land purchases in 1937. The plans succeeded and by 1938 there was a waiting list for family's who wanted to enrol their daughters.

In 1939 the school opened new classrooms to teach science and other subjects, but the waiting list continued. Some schools closed during the second world war, but Abbotsleigh continued. The school gained an improving reputation as students results improved and more students went on to university. At the same time, culture was not ignored, Gordon Everett owned post-impressionist paintings that were hung in the school.

By the time Gordon Everett retired in 1954, there was 660 students; a separate junior school building had opened and the waiting list was still extant. Her portrait was made by the painter William Joshua Smith.

In January 1960 she became a Member of the Most Excellent Order of the British Empire.

Everett died in Russia while travelling in 1971. In 2000 a scholarship was established in her name by a grateful ex-pupil.
