= Anita Jacoby =

Australian film and television producer

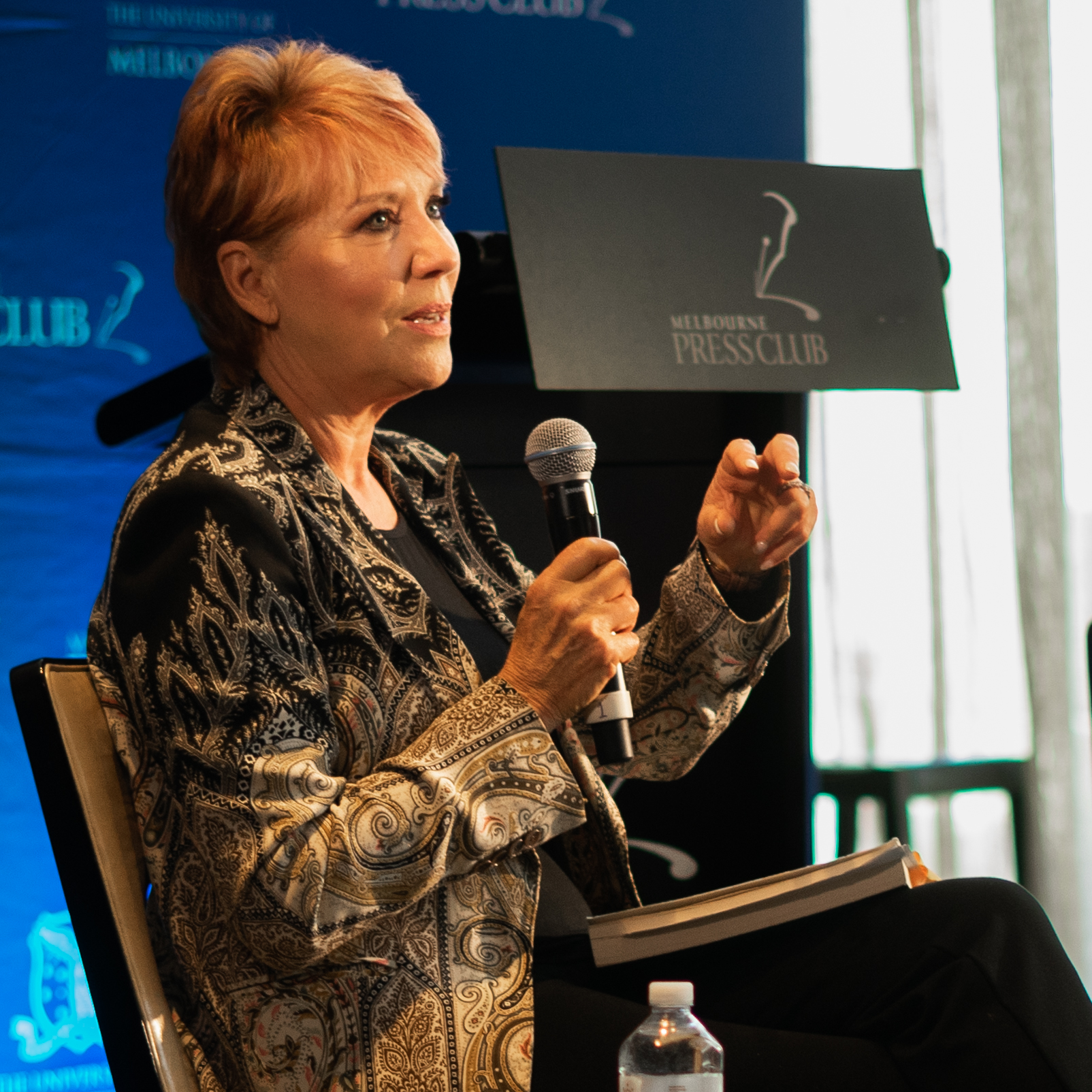
- Jacoby speaks at a Melbourne Press Club event, August 2022.

Anita Jacoby, AM is an Australian television producer and journalist.

== Life ==
Jacoby was born in Sydney, Australia, the daughter of political refugees displaced through the Second World War. Her father was born in Heinrichswalde, Germany, and her mother, a White Russian, was born in Harbin, Manchuria. Growing up, Jacoby aspired to a career in the creative industries, although she was expelled from Pymble Ladies' College at the beginning of Year 10 “for being a pretty adventurous and difficult 15-year-old determined to push the boundaries”. Before entering the television industry, she had a number of jobs in book publishing and the print industry. Her first job after leaving school was as a marketing trainee at Paul Hamlyn Publishing Company before becoming a trainee book editor working on Australia’s Heritage. She then studied economics at Sydney University before returning to Paul Hamlyn's as a book editor. After Hamlyn's Jacoby joined Australian Consolidated Press as a journalist working on the Australian Women’s Weekly.

== Career ==
Jacoby's first job in television was as a researcher on Makin’ Trax, a children's show hosted by singer, Robin Jolley and produced at the studios of BTV6 Ballarat (1980). She then joined leading children's TV program, Simon Townsend's Wonder World! (Network Ten) as a researcher/writer (1981).

In 1982, Jacoby joined the newsroom at NBN3 Newcastle as a reporter/journalist before forming G & J Productions with producer, Helen Grasswill creating and producing an original TV series for ATN7, Weekend Sydney (1983). She then worked as a reporter/director on Magazine, a current affairs series on SBS (1984). In 1985 she moved to breakfast television as an on-air producer at Good Morning Australia (Network Ten) hosted by Kerri-Anne Kennerley and Gordon Elliott. The following year (1986) Jacoby joined rival breakfast show, today with George Negus and Liz Hayes (Nine Network), rising through the ranks to supervising producer. She was never promoted to executive producer, with a man being promoted ahead of her on each occasion when the position became vacant.

Jacoby was appointed an associate producer, then producer at 60 Minutes (Nine Network) where she worked from 1989 to 1995. She left the Nine Network to join the Seven Network as a producer on various specials including The Backpacker Murders, Towards Sydney 2000, Andrew Denton meets Kevin Costner and as Series Producer on Missing Pieces and Who Dares Wins. In 1997 she joined current affairs program Witness (Seven Network) as a producer. Towards the end of 1997 Jacoby was approached to set up an interview program with broadcaster, John Laws for Foxtel. The LAWS program secured a world exclusive final interview with fugitive businessman, Christopher Skase at his home, La Noria in Majorca, Spain. LAWS was broadcast five nights a week from 1998 to 2000 and guests included Earl Spencer, brother of Princess Diana, Helen Mirren, Viscount Linley, Jerry Lewis, and the Irish actor Richard Harris.

In 2001, Jacoby returned to the Nine Network as a producer on the Sunday program where she produced an award-winning story on the theft of body parts at Glebe Morgue alongside reporter, Helen Dalley. She then rejoined 60 Minutes as a senior producer. Jacoby was appointed Executive Producer of the Canadian format, Surprise Surprise (Nine Network) and an original program idea, Only Human, hosted by Liz Hayes. Towards the end of 2002 she was approached by Andrew Denton to become executive producer on Enough Rope for an initial 13-week series on the ABC.

From 2003 to 2012, Jacoby worked as the head of production and development as well as executive producer, alongside Andrew Denton at independent production company, Zapruder's Other Films. Zapruder's became one of Australia's leading producers of original programs including: Enough Rope with Andrew Denton, 2003-2008 (ABC); Brothers in Arms, 2005 (ABC); The Gruen Transfer/Gruen Nation/Gruen Sport, 2008- (ABC); Elders, 2006-2008 (ABC); God on My Side, 2006 (Feature Documentary/ABC); David Tench Tonight, 2006 (Network Ten); Angels & Demons, 2008 (ABC) Hungry Beast 2010-2011 (ABC); Can of Worms 2011-2012 (Network Ten); AFP 2011-2012 (Nine Network); Country Town Rescue 2012 (ABC).

In 2013, Jacoby was appointed managing director of ITV Studios Australia. She was responsible for the commission of I’m A Celebrity by Network Ten and The Chase by the Seven Network. In 2015, Jacoby left ITV Studios Australia to pursue new opportunities.

=== Other media ===
In 2013, Jacoby was appointed to the Australian Communications and Media Authority (ACMA) for a five-year term by the Minister of Communications. In the same year she established the annual Jacoby Walkley Scholarship for young broadcast journalists through the Walkley Foundation. The program was still active as of 2019.

She was a board director of Arts Law Centre of Australia from 2013 to 2016. Jacoby has been a supporter of Documentary Australia Foundation since 2013 and a member of the Screen Producer's Association since 2015. In 2016 Jacoby joined the National Advisory Board of Women in Media Australia, becoming a director in 2018.

Since 2017, Jacoby has been a board director with the Australian Film Institute (AFI) and Australian Academy of Cinema and Television Arts (AACTA).

In 2018, Jacoby was appointed to a second five-year term at the ACMA.

She has also been a member of the Chair's Circle at Belvoir St. Theatre since 2013.

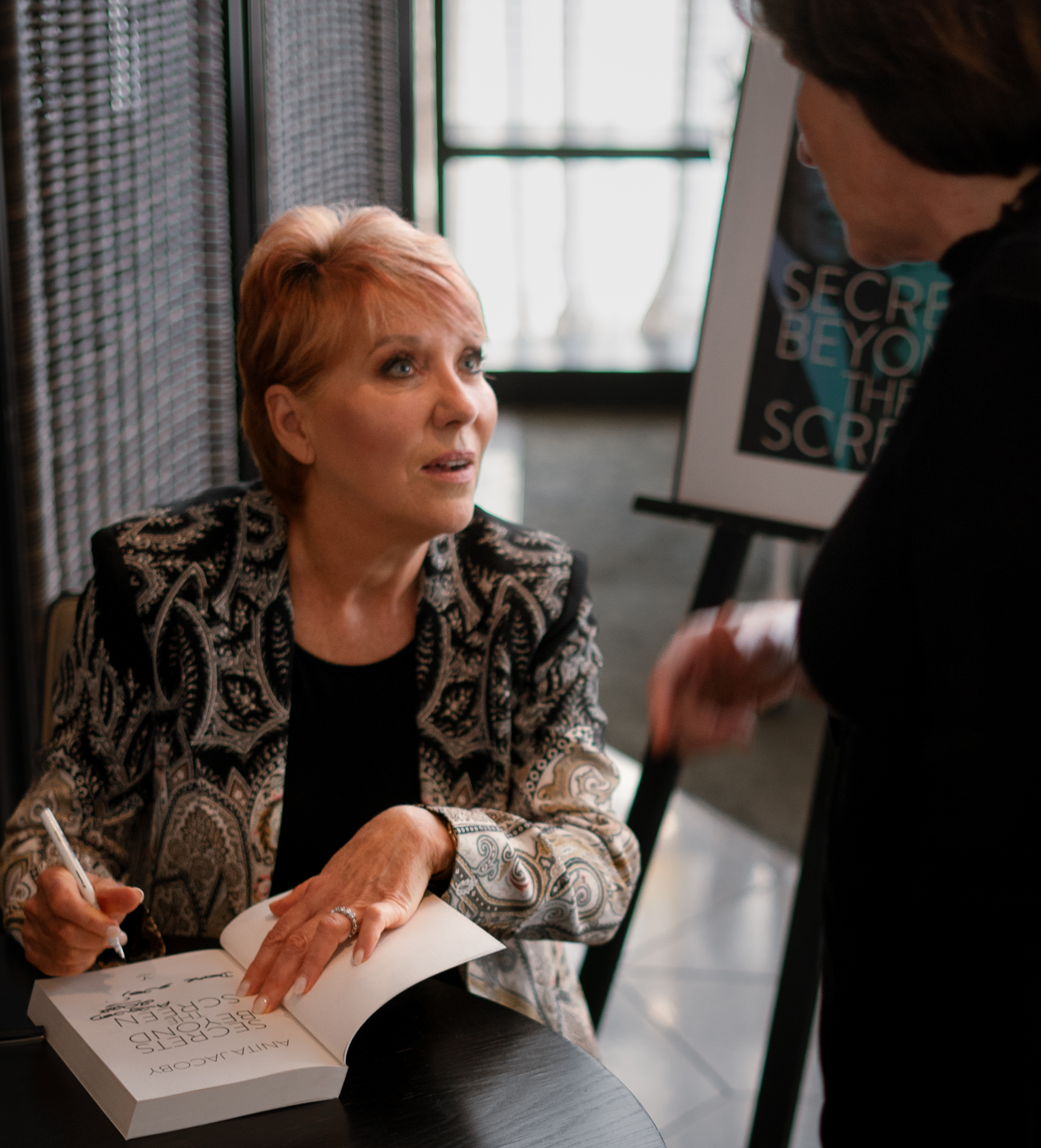
Jacoby signs a copy of Secrets Beyond the Screen at an MPC Book Club lunch.

In 2022 her memoir, Secrets Beyond the Screen, was published by Ventura Press.

== Community roles ==
Jacoby is an ambassador for The Duke of Edinburgh's International Award – Australia and was chair of the 60th Anniversary Committee (2019). and chair of the Brand, Media & Marketing Committee as of 2020.

Alzheimer's Australia/Dementia Australia:

- Member, New South Wales Advisory Committee, 2012-2017
- Involved in the establishment of the Phillip Jacoby Scholarship, Genetic Research of Alzheimer's, Faculty of Medicine, Sydney University, 2007–2012.

Headspace:

- Non-Executive Board Director, 2013-2016
- Member, Headspace Finance, Audit and Risk Committee, 2013-2016

The Duke of Edinburgh International Award - Australia:

- Chair, 60th Anniversary (2019) Committee, since 2017
- National Board's Communications and Media Advisor, since 2016
- Award Ambassador, since 2013

The Funding Network:

- Non-Executive Board Director, since 2016

1 Million Women:

- Advisory Board Member, since 2012
- Ambassador, since 2009

Merry Makers Australia:

- Supporter, since 1992

== Honours and awards ==
Anita Jacoby was appointed a member of the Order of Australia (AM) on Australia Day 2019 for her significant service to broadcasting and print media, and to community mental health groups.

- Australian Academy of Cinema & Television Arts (AACTA) Award, Best Light Entertainment: The Gruen Transfer, 2012
- Australian Academy of Cinema & Television Arts (AACTA) Nomination, Best Light Entertainment: Hungry Beast, 2011
- TV Tonight Awards – Best Light Entertainment Program: The Gruen Transfer/Gruen Planet, 2011
- Australian Film Institute (AFI) Award, Best Light Entertainment: Enough Rope with Andrew Denton, 2008
- Australian Film Institute (AFI) Award Nomination, Best Light Entertainment: The Gruen Transfer, 2008
- OPSO (Older People Speak Out) Award: Elders Series, 2008
- Human Rights Award (Highly Commended): Angels & Demons (Mental Health Documentary), 2008
- Australian & NZ Mental Health Service Achievement Award: Angels & Demons, 2008
- QLD Mental Health Week Achievement Awards: Angels & Demons, 2008
- Mental Illness Fellowship of Australia – Commendation: Angels & Demons, 2008
- LIFE Award: Angels & Demons, 2008
- WA Mental Health Good Outcomes Award: Angels & Demons, 2008
- Australian Film Institute (AFI) Award, Best Light Entertainment: Enough Rope, 2006
- OPSO Award, National TV News and Current Affairs: Enough Rope, 2005
- Australian Film Institute (AFI) Award, Best Light Entertainment: Enough Rope, 2004
- OPSO Award – Electronic Media: Enough Rope, 2004
- Australian Film Institute (AFI) Award, Best Light Entertainment: Enough Rope, 2003
- OPSO Award: Enough Rope, 2003
- Mental Health Matters Award: Enough Rope, 2003
- Alzheimer's Association Award: Witness, 1997
- Asia-Pacific Broadcast Union Award: 60 Minutes, 1996
- Order of Australia Media Award: 60 Minutes, 1995
- Australian Ski Award, Best Electronic Media: 60 Minutes, 1995
- Logie Award: 60 Minutes – Chelmsford Hospital Documentary, 1991
- Gold Distinguished Service Medal, The Duke of Edinburgh's International Award – Australia (2021)
