= Abbotsleigh =

Independent girls' school in Wahroonga, New South Wales, Australia

Location
- Wahroonga, New South Wales; Australia; 33°43′13″S 151°6′47″E

Information
- Type: Independent early learning, primary and secondary day and boarding school
- Motto: Latin: Tempus Celerius Radio Fugit (Time Flies Faster than a Weaver's Shuttle)
- Denomination: Anglican
- Established: 20 July 1885; 141 years ago
- Headmistress: Megan Krimmer
- Employees: ~265
- Years: Early learning and K–12
- Gender: Girls
- Enrolment: ~1,400 (2017)
- Colours: Black and gold
- Affiliation: Alliance of Girls' Schools Australasia; Junior School Heads Association of Australia; Association of Heads of Independent Schools of Australia; Australian Boarding Schools' Association; Association of Heads of Independent Girls' Schools
- Website: www.abbotsleigh.nsw.edu.au

Abbotsleigh is an independent Anglican early learning, primary, secondary day, and boarding school for girls located in Wahroonga, on the Upper North Shore of Sydney, New South Wales, Australia. The school currently educates approximately 1630 students from Transition (pre-school) to Year 12, including 170 boarders from Year 7 to 12.

Abbotsleigh is affiliated with various educational organizations, including the Alliance of Girls' Schools Australasia (AGSA), the Junior School Heads Association of Australia (JSHAA), the Association of Heads of Independent Schools of Australia (AHISA), the Australian Boarding Schools' Association (ABSA), and a founding member of the Association of Heads of Independent Girls' Schools (AHIGS).

The school ranked first based on academic performance among independent schools in New South Wales from 2013 to 2015. In 2023, the school ranked tenth in the High School Certificate (HSC).

== History ==
Abbotsleigh was founded by Marian Clarke in 1885 in a small terrace house in North Sydney. The school then moved to Parramatta; first to Honiton House, then to more spacious premises at the corner of Church and Marsden streets, a site now covered by a car park. The school proved successful in Parramatta, but in 1895 Clarke left 80 pupils behind to set out for a year in England to visit her family. The school declined during her absence, and on her return only a small number of boarders remained.

In 1930 a new headmistress, Gladys Gordon Everett, was chosen from a long list of candidates. Everett had been head of Pymble Ladies' College before she left to study in France. She had taught in France and England before she led Katanning Church of England Girls' School. In 1931 Gordon Everett arranged the students into houses and in 1933 the school celebrated founder's day. In the same year the school began buying land and nearby houses. The school's expansion plans involved more land purchases in 1937. The plans succeeded and by 1938 there was a waiting list for families who wanted to enrol their daughters. Gordon Everett taught lessons in Divinity and in French.

In 1939 new classrooms opened, but the waiting list continued to grow. Some schools closed during the Second World War, but Abbotsleigh continued.

By the time Gordon Everett retired in 1954, there were 660 students, a separate junior school had started, and there was still a waiting list.

Buildings that developed over the years include the Marian Clarke building facing the Pacific Highway, Vindin House, Lynton House, and Poole House on the junior campus. The last three are listed on the local government heritage register.

== Headmistresses ==
The following individuals have served as the Headmistress:

Ordinal	Officeholder	Term start	Term end	Time in office	Notes
1	Marian Clarke	1885	1913	27–28 years	
2	Margaret Murray	1913	1924	10–11 years	
3	Dorothea Poole	1924	1930	5–6 years	
4	G. Gordon Everett	1931	1954	22–23 years	
5	Ruth Hirst	1954	1957	2–3 years	
6	H. E. (Betty) Archdale	1958	1970	11–12 years	
7	Kathleen McCredie AM	1970	1987	16–17 years	
8	Diane C. Nicholls OAM	1988	1996	7–8 years	
9	Judith Wheeldon AM	1996	2004	7–8 years	
10	Judith Poole	2005	2016	10–11 years	
11	Megan Krimmer	2017	present	8–9 years	

== Structure ==
Abbotsleigh has a total enrolment of approximately 1,400 girls across Years K–12. In 2016, the Senior School campus had an enrolment of approximately 900 girls in Years 7–12. The main high school is divided into the Middle School (Year Seven and Eight), Senior College Archdale (Year Nine and Ten), and Senior College (Year Eleven and Twelve).

Each house group within a year has a tutor, and every year is managed by a year coordinator, and overseen by the Dean of Middle School or Deans of Senior College.

There is also a nearby Junior School, also located in Wahroonga, which houses the Early Learning Centre, Transition and Kindergarten to Year Six. Each year, approximately two-thirds of the incoming Year Seven class at Senior School are from the Junior School, while the rest are drawn from schools in Sydney, from interstate and overseas, having passed selective entry examinations and/or interviews to gain an enrolment place.

The school council is responsible for the school's governance. Kanishka Raffel, Archbishop of Sydney, serves as its chair.

== Campus ==
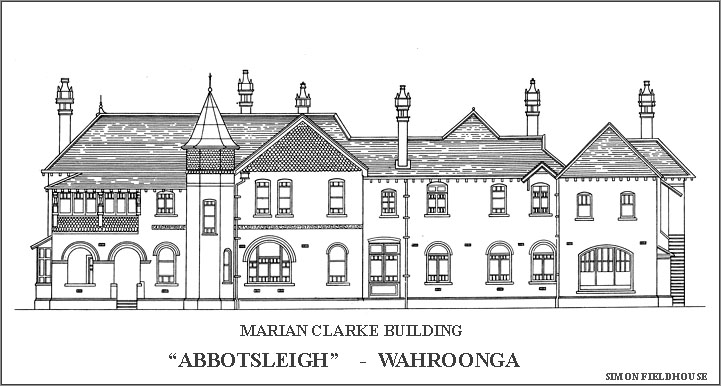
Marian Clarke Building, Abbotsleigh (Elevation)

The senior and junior campuses cater for 1400 students in total from Transition to Year 12 (Higher School Certificate).

=== Junior Campus ===
The Junior Campus is located on Woonona Avenue in Wahroonga. Poole House, the oldest building on the campus, serves as an after-school care and music center with music rooms for lessons. The campus includes a library, school hall, and administration center alongside junior classrooms.In 2002, a center for Years 4–6 was built around a grassy courtyard that features an arts facility and canteen. Sporting facilities include a large oval, outdoor pool, three tennis courts, and various play areas. An underground parking facility was completed in 2007, with kindergarten classrooms above it.

The new Early Learning Center was completed in January 2010. It includes a new Infants precinct and an Early Learning Centre for the youngest learners from birth to five years old. It is a seventy-place, coeducational center providing long day care. Girls of the age of 5 are now able to enter the school in the Transition class (preschool age), where they are able to make the smooth transition from preschool to kindergarten. The ELC is run according to the Reggio Emilia principles.

=== Senior Campus ===
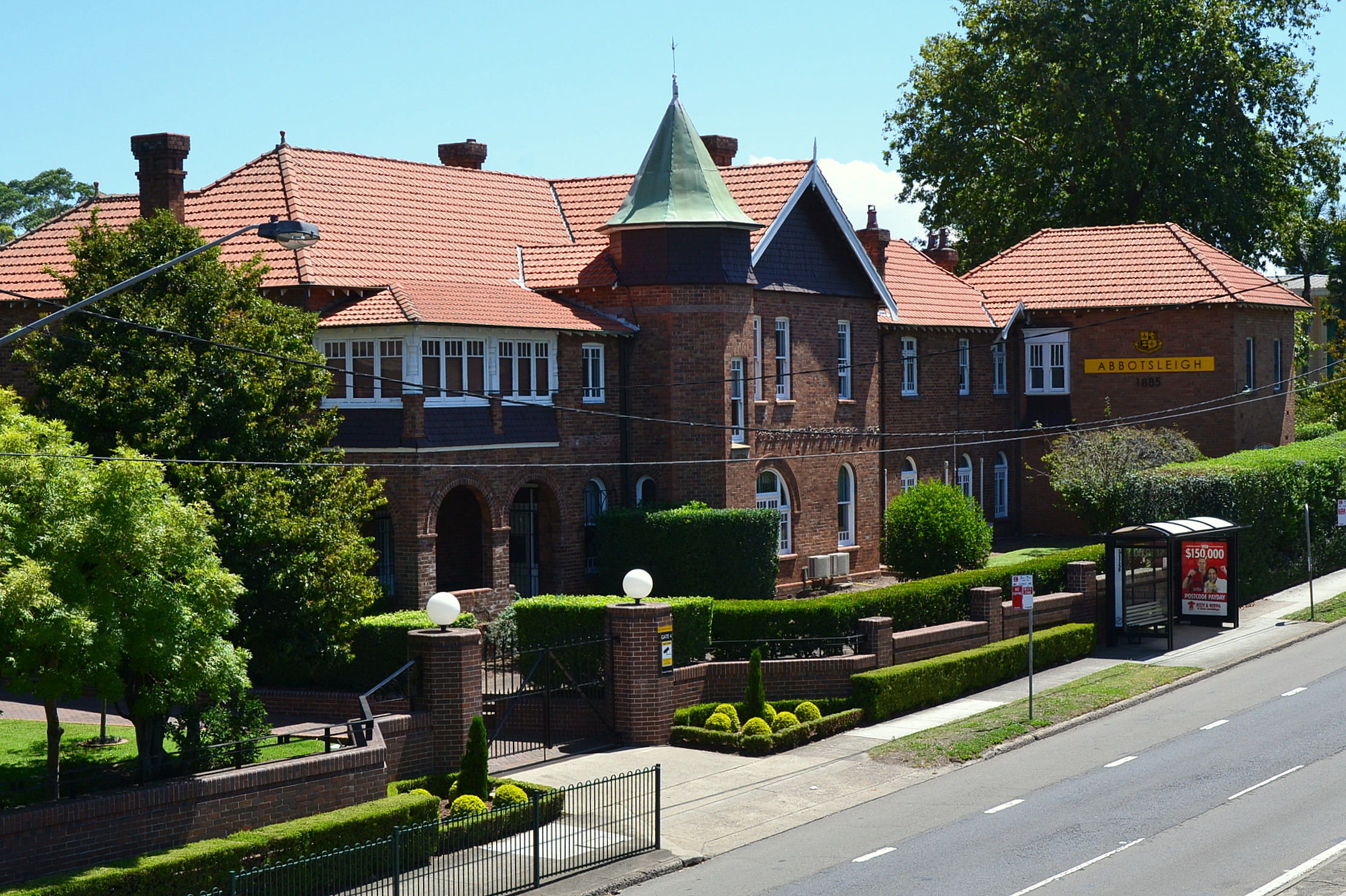

The Senior Campus is located on the Pacific Highway and includes an auditorium, assembly hall, Senior Studies Centre, Aquatic Centre, and two gymnasiums. Sporting facilities feature 11 tennis courts, three indoor gyms, two weights gyms, two cricket nets, a 25-metre indoor pool, and two large ovals for hockey, touch football, and soccer, including a multi-purpose synthetic turf oval with spectator stands. A new library named the Abbotsleigh Research Centre (ARC) was built and officially opened on 2 April 2006. The ARC has won awards for its unique interior design. Vindin House was converted into the Grace Cossington Smith Gallery (named after Old Girl Grace Cossington Smith),

In addition to this, a new canteen was built in 2008 to join with the Saturday morning sports canteen, featuring new outdoor café-style eating areas overlooking the oval. The Judith Poole Sports Hall was built in 2015 an award-winning design at the 2018 World Architecture Awards.

== Motto and crest ==
The Abbotsleigh motto, Tempus celerius radio fugit, may be translated from Latin as "Time flies faster than the weaver's shuttle". As the shuttle flies a pattern is woven; the shuttle of time also weaves a pattern of which the threads are people, buildings and events. The motto was given to the school by Marian Clarke, whose family crest was a weaver's shuttle surrounded by the motto, Tempus fugit radio celerit. The school used this form until 1924, when it decided that the ungrammatical Latin should be changed to the present word order, which has been used ever since.

The reference to the weaver's shuttle is also believed by many to be a reference to the "proper" place of women in terms of domestic duties/servitude to men. Some members of the school community have called for the motto to be changed to keep pace with modern views on feminine rights.

The 1934 edition of The Weaver explains the symbolism of the school crest: "the lion for the strength in God, lillies for purity and fish as the symbol of Christianity through baptism."

== Associated schools ==
Abbotsleigh has a number of international sister schools and exchange agreements with other institutes, including the École Alsacienne in Paris, France, Ohtani High School, Japan, Beijing Yucai School, China, Annette-von-Droste-Hülshoff-Gymnasium in Münster, Germany, Miami's Palmer Trinity School, Moreton Hall in Oswestry, England, Queenswood School in Hertfordshire, England, and Ridley College in Ontario, Canada. Girls have the opportunity to host an incoming exchange student or, in Years 9 and 10, to attend one or more of these schools on exchange for a period of one or two terms.

Abbotsleigh is also unofficially associated as the sister school to The King's School, an independent Anglican day and boarding school for boys in North Parramatta, St Joseph’s College and Sydney Church of England Grammar School, an independent Anglican day and boarding school for boys in North Sydney.

== Curriculum ==
Abbotsleigh offers a range of subjects. The academic departments are:

- Christian studies
- Drama
- English
- History (Australian, Ancient and Modern)
- Languages
- Mathematics
- Music
- PDHPE
- Science
- Social sciences (Economics, Geography, Business Studies)
- Technology and applied sciences (also known as Design and Technology)
- Visual Arts

Abbotsleigh provides an academic education, with Maths, Science and English being graded by class from years 7–10. Other subjects, such as languages and music, also place students in streamed classes. In Year 8, students choose elective subjects to study for Years 9 and 10. Students must study Maths, English, Science, PDHPE, Australian History/Geography, and Christian Studies. They may then choose three elective subjects from: Commerce, Elective History, Elective Geography, Design and Technology, Information Software Technology, Music, Drama, Visual Arts, Photography and Digital Media, Chinese Mandarin, French, German, and Latin.

In the Upper School, students have an wider range of subjects to choose from, which follow the Board of Studies HSC syllabus. Subjects offered include English (Advanced, Extension 1 and Extension 2), Mathematics (Standard 2, Advanced, Extension 1 and Extension 2), the sciences (Biology, Chemistry, Physics, Earth and Environmental Science), History (Modern, Ancient and Extension History), the social sciences (Business Studies, Geography, Economics), Music (1, 2, Extension), Theology and Studies of Religion (1 and 2 unit), a wide range of languages including French, German, and Latin, Art, PDHPE, Software Design and Development, Drama, and Design and Technology.

== Co-curriculum ==
Students can participate in a number of extracurricular activities. Most girls participate in at least one activity, but can participate in many. Abbotsleigh has a number of students achieve the Gold Duke of Edinburgh Award each year, which is presented at the school's Speech Day in December. Additionally students may participate in chess teams, debating, mock trial, public speaking, ski team, jewellery making, ceramics, sewing classes, film club, SRC, Environment Club, and over seven different charity and service groups such as World Vision and Amnesty International clubs. Students from Year 10 are selected to form the charity and service group boards with students taking the positions of president, secretary, treasurer and committee member. The school also has an Agricultural group (Ag Club) where chickens are raised every year for a number of competitions including the Sydney Royal Easter Show.

There is also a dance program of considerable size at the school, with over 500 girls from Kindergarten to Year 11 participating in several types of dance such as street, tap and contemporary.

=== Sport ===
The school participates in Independent Girls' Schools Sporting Association (IGSSA) sports including softball, tennis, swimming, diving, basketball, soccer, athletics, cross country, hockey, netball, water polo, touch football, and cricket. Other offered sports include equestrian, golf, sailing, snow sports and rhythmic and artistic gymnastics. Abbotsleigh employs a sports staff department and provides sports coaches and much of the sport equipment including hockey kits, golf sets etc. It is compulsory for Abbotsleigh girls to take part in PE once a week until Year 11.

=== Music ===
Abbotsleigh has a co‑curricular music program. Its varied instrumental ensembles include Orchestra, Symphonic Winds, Jazz Ensemble, Senior Strings, String Ensemble and Concert Band. Chamber groups such as String Quartets, Flute Ensemble, Brass Ensemble, Guitar Ensemble and Clarinet and Saxophone Ensemble are also available to girls without an audition. Girls are invited to participate in Choir, and may audition for smaller vocal groups such as Vocal Ensemble and Chamber Choir. Girls can also be involved in the Gospel Choir, which performs at various Chapel services throughout the year. These ensembles participate in multiple school-based events throughout the year, as well as eisteddfods and music festivals. There are also opportunities to participate in interstate and international music tours, musicals and gala concerts.

Abbotsleigh also offers an Extended Tuition music program from Kindergarten to Year 12, where girls have the opportunity to learn an instrument (piano, singing, woodwind, brass, strings or percussion instruments) from one of their Peripatetic instrumental teachers. Girls who are involved in this program are also encouraged to participate in their co‑curricular ensembles.

Additionally, Abbotsleigh's Junior School offers a Year 2 String Program, where girls are required to learn either violin or cello. Girls in Year 3 participate in the Year 3 Instrumental Program, where they are introduced to a band instrument, such as flute, clarinet or trumpet. Girls then have the option of continuing these studies in the Extended Tuition music program and Junior School co‑curricular ensembles.

=== Performing arts ===
Abbotsleigh caters for a range of creative talents and provides an performing arts program. In addition to drama classes (compulsory in Middle School), it is offered as a subject in Senior College years and the HSC. Student-directed productions, Middle and Senior School plays, an annual "Shakespeare festival", theatre sports and school musicals are included in the school calendar. Musicals and plays are often produced and performed in collaboration with Knox Grammar, a neighbouring boys' college.

=== Debating and public speaking ===
Abbotsleigh has a tradition of debating and public speaking. The school participates in several major competitions, including the Independent Schools Debating Association (ISDA), consisting of 32 private schools, the Archdale Debating Competition established in honour of former headmistress Miss Betty Archdale, also involving over 20 schools and the Sydney Debating Network (SDN). Abbotsleigh has consistently achieved championship results in these competitions, fostered due to extensive coaching and development squad programs. Girls also often debate at representative level in AHIGS and NSW state squads.

Abbotsleigh also participates in several public speaking competitions including Rostrum Voice of Youth, Legacy Public Speaking, SMH Plain English Speaking Award and AHIGS Festival of Speech.

=== Service programs ===
Abbotsleigh has a Service-Learning program. A number of student-run charity clubs exist within the school, with elected positions such as president, treasurer and secretary. These include Amnesty International, Fairtrade, Interact Club (in collaboration with Rotary), Oaktree, World Vision and Zonta Club (supporting the Hornsby Ku-ring-gai branch of Zonta International).

All Year Nine girls undertake the Duke of Edinburgh International Award, with many achieving the Gold Level in senior years. In Year Ten, all girls are required to participate in a week of service learning, ALE (Abbotsleigh Learning Experience).

== Gallery ==
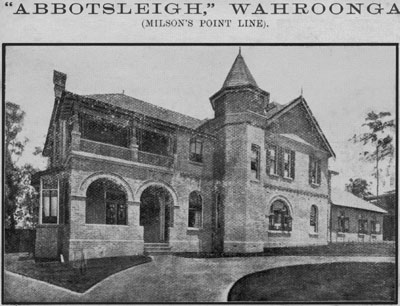
Marian Clarke Building in 1899 advertisement

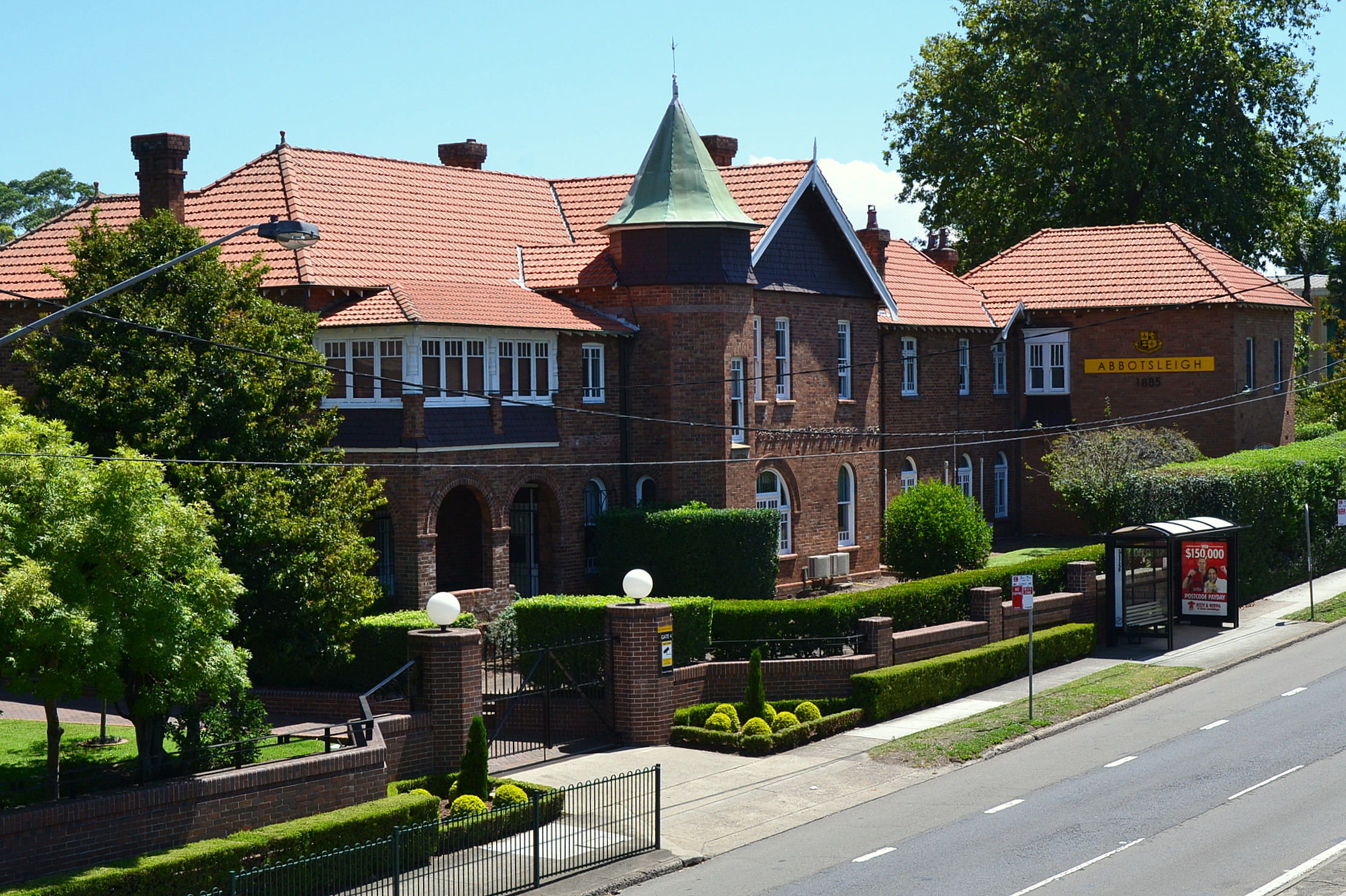
Marian Clarke Building today

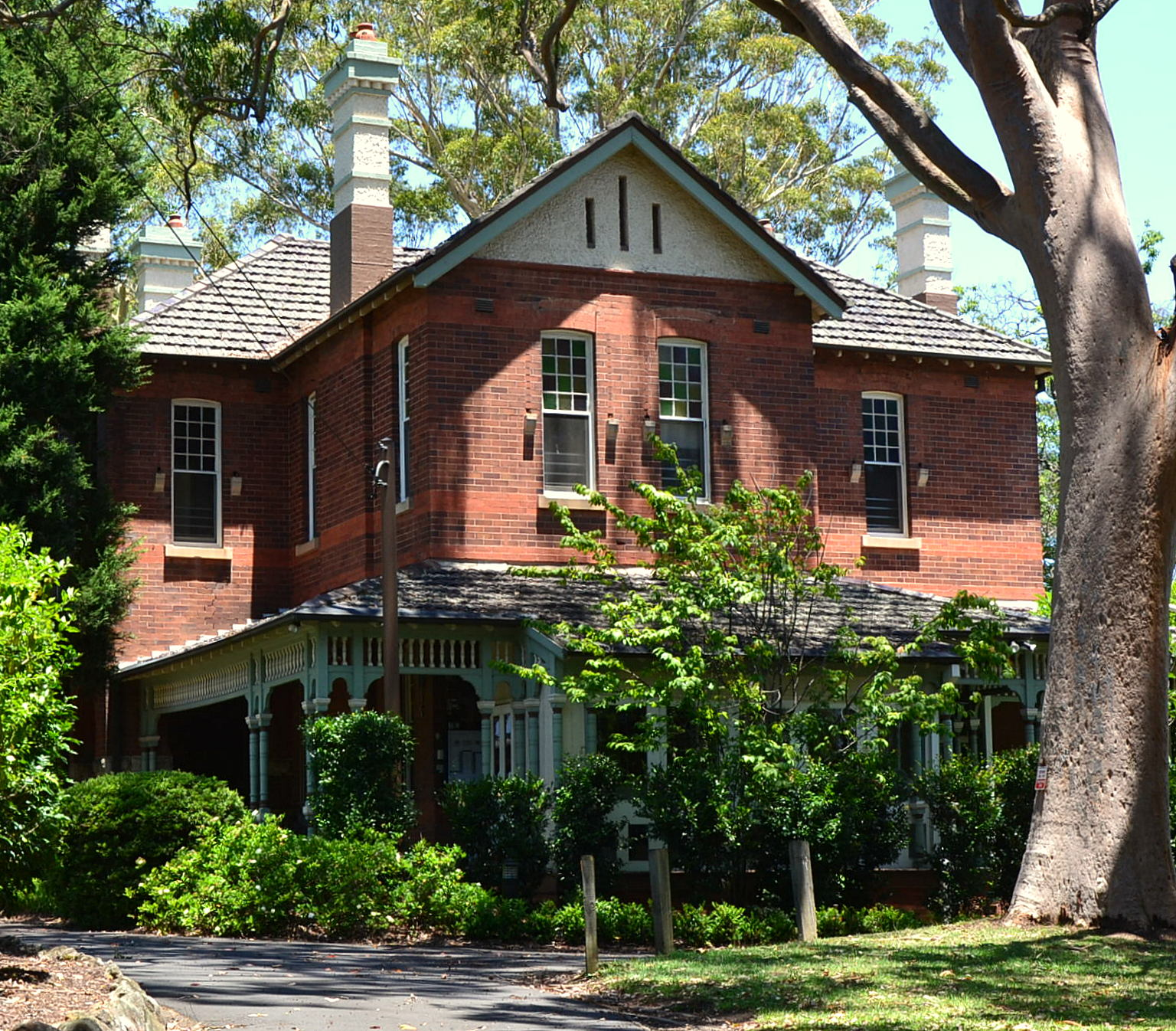
Lynton House

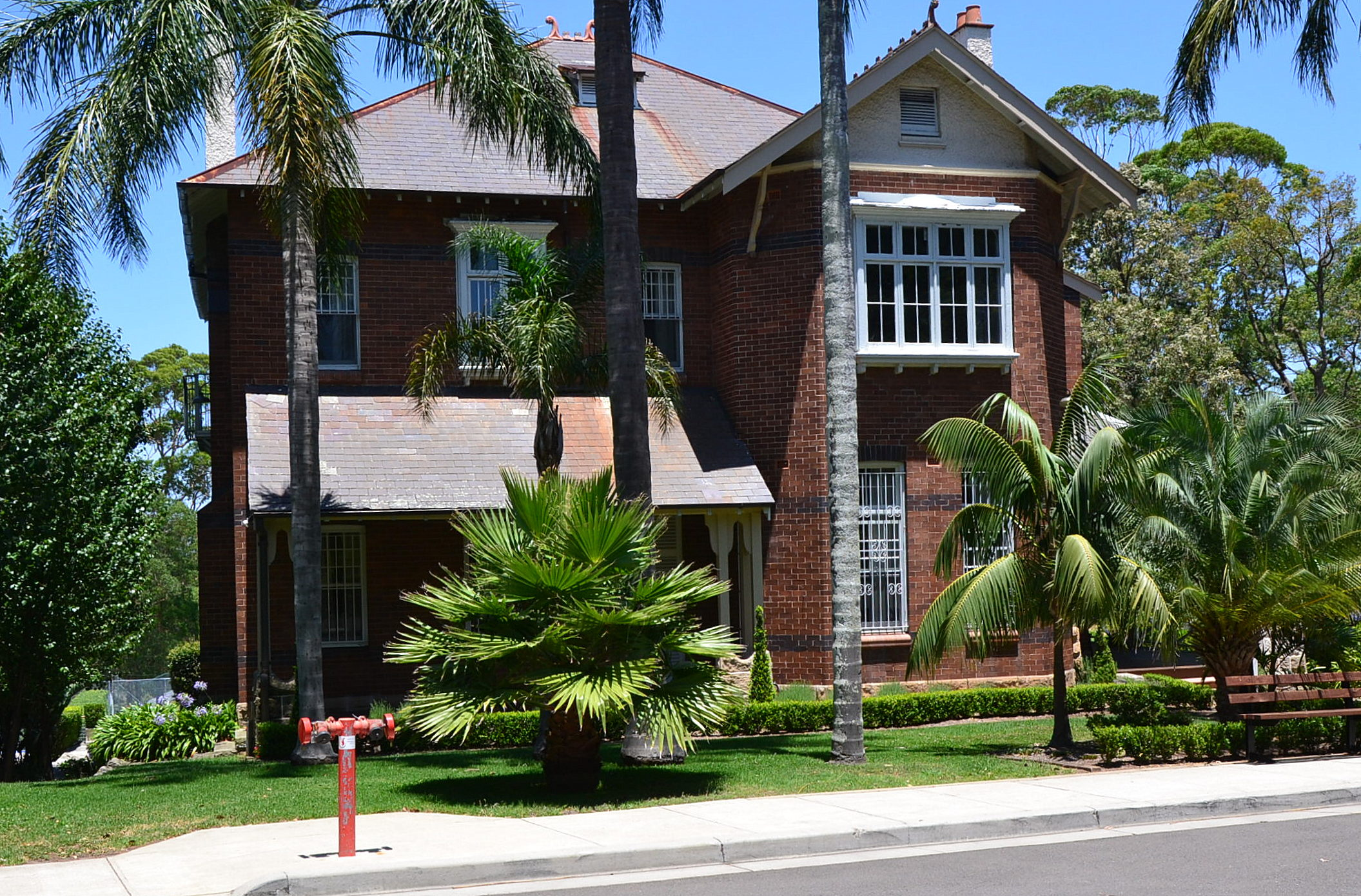
Vindin House

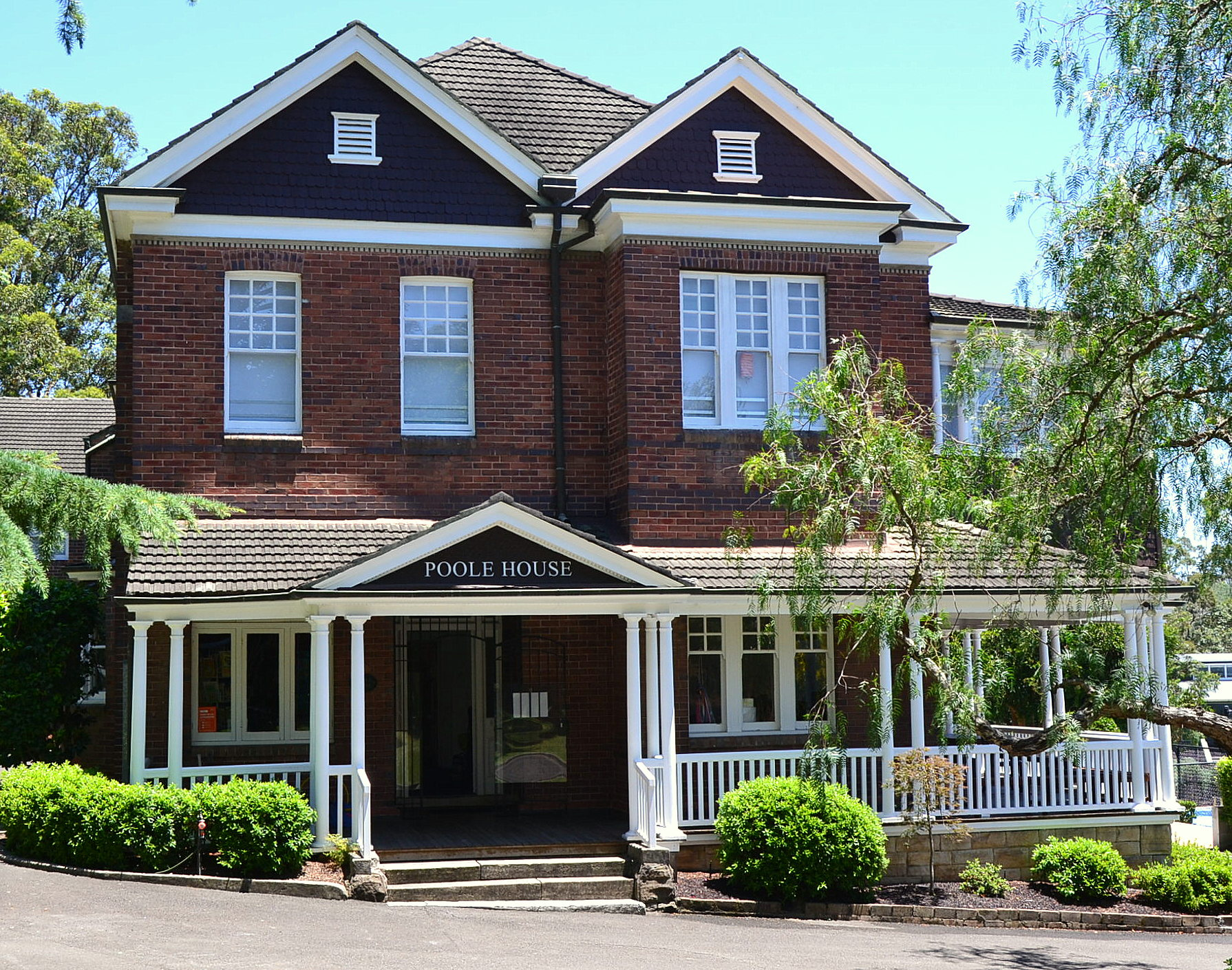
Poole house

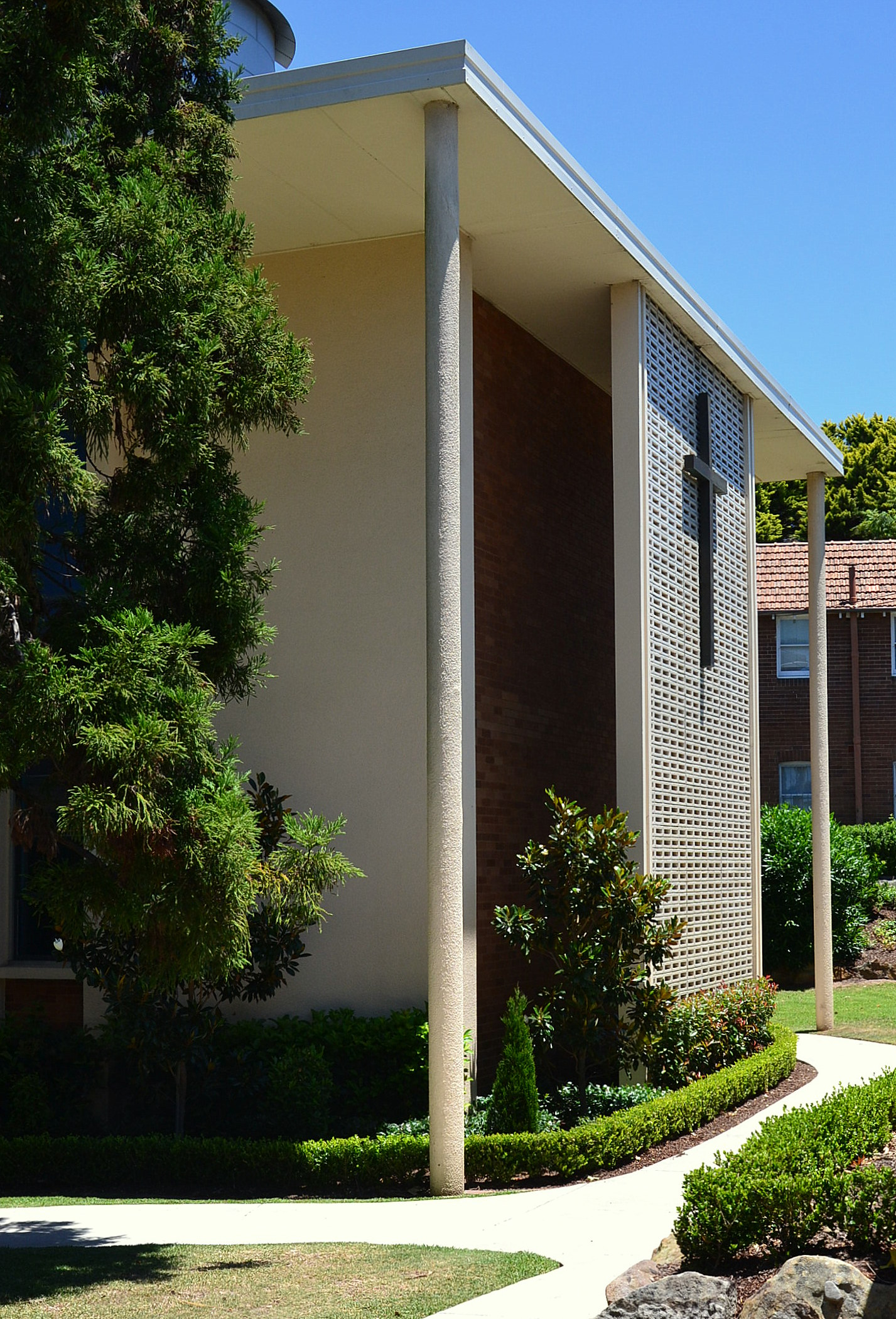
School Chapel

== House system ==
The house system was introduced by Miss Everett, and is similarly based upon that of Dr Arnold's house system at Rugby School. The Weaver for May 1931 explains: "Points are awarded for work, conduct and sport and a shield will be presented annually to the winning House". The "Malloch Shield", given the following year by A Malloch, was won for the first time by Sturt.

In the junior school there are five houses:

House	Colour	Name Origin
Blaxland	Blue	Named after Gregory Blaxland (1778–1853), an Australian explorer and pioneer farmer.
Lawson	Green	Named after William Lawson (1774–1850), an Australian explorer.
Macquarie	Red	Named after Lachlan Macquarie (1771–1824), the Governor of New South Wales from 1810 to 1821.
Sturt	Yellow	Named after Charles Sturt (1795–1869), an Australian explorer.
Wentworth	Purple	Named after William Wentworth (1790–1872), an Australian explorer, statesman and lawyer.

In the senior school there are eight houses:

House	Colour	Name Origin
Chisholm	Dark Blue	Named after Caroline Chisholm (1808–1877), an Australian pioneer.
Franklin	Green	Named after Miles Franklin, an acclaimed Australian author.
Gilmore	Pink	Named after Mary Gilmore (1865–1962), an Australian poet and writer. The House was originally brown until 1982.
Melba	Light Blue	Named after Dame Nellie Melba (1861–1931), an Australian opera singer.
Prichard	Purple	Named after Katharine Susannah Prichard (1884–1969), an Australian writer. The house was originally black until 1990.
Richardson	Orange	Named after Ethel Florence Lindesay Richardson (1870–1946), an Australian novelist.
Tennant	Yellow	Named after Kylie Tennant (1912–1988), an Australian World War II and Great Depression novelist.
Wright	Red	Named after Judith Wright (1915–2000), an Australian poet.

The house system has been modified over time to reflect the changing needs of the school, and its increased enrolment. One of the most significant changes occurred in the late 1960s under then Headmistress Betty Archdale. Senior school houses had previously been named after well-known male Australian poets, and Archdale introduced new house names recognising accomplished Australian women. This was the basis for the senior school houses in use today. Houses now compete for the House Choir banner and the Spirit Cup, as well as the Sports Cup. Since 2008 girls have organised get-to-know-each-other events and House Days where students of the same house assemble at lunch time and have a large "house picnic".

== Boarding ==
Abbotsleigh has offered boarding since its establishment, and currently caters for boarding students from the greater metropolitan area, rural New South Wales and overseas. The school has five boarding houses at the moment.

- Hirst, opened in 1980 and 1985. Catering for Year 12 boarders. Now replaced by the newly opened Wheeldon House.
- Lynton, opened in 1969. Catering for Year 7 boarders.
- McCredie, opened in 1990. Catering for Year 9 to 10 boarders.
- Read, opened in 1931. Catering for Year 8 to 9 boarders.
- Wheeldon, opened in 2008. Catering for Year 11 to 12 boarders

There are currently approximately 150 boarders at Abbotsleigh from Years 7 to 12. Boarders make up about one-sixth of the senior school population.

== See also ==
- List of non-government schools in New South Wales
- List of boarding schools in Australia
- List of Anglican schools in New South Wales
