= Mount St Benedict College =

Location
- Pennant Hills, New South Wales; Australia; 33°44′27″S 151°3′33″E

Information
- Type: Independent day school
- Motto: Latin: Pax (Peace)
- Religious affiliation: Sisters of the Good Samaritan
- Denomination: Roman Catholicism
- Established: 1 February 1966; 60 years ago
- Educational authority: New South Wales Department of Education
- Oversight: Diocese of Broken Bay
- Principal: Michael Hanratty
- Staff: 113
- Years: 7–12
- Gender: Girls
- Enrolment: 1320 (2008)
- Colours: Grey and maroon
- Nickname: Bennies
- Affiliations: Alliance of Girls' Schools Australasia; Association of Heads of Independent Girls' Schools; Association of Independent Schools, NSW
- Website: www.msb.nsw.edu.au

Mount St Benedict College is an independent Catholic secondary day school for girls, located in Pennant Hills, a suburb on the Upper North Shore of Sydney, New South Wales, Australia. The college provides a religious and comprehensive education in the Good Samaritan tradition to approximately 1,000 girls from Year 7 to Year 12.

Mount St Benedict College commenced on 1 February 1966 with 65 students under the guidance of Sisters Christopher Burrows and Hyacinth Roche. The college is now an incorporated body which operates as an independent Catholic Congregational school with a board of directors. In 2008 there were approximately 835 girls from Year 7 to Year 12. Mount St Benedict is affiliated with the Alliance of Girls' Schools Australasia (AGSA) and the Association of Heads of Independent Girls' Schools (AHIGS).

== History ==
Established by the Sisters of the Good Samaritan of the Order of St Benedict in 1966, the college is located in the Roman Catholic Diocese of Broken Bay and run under the auspices of the Sisters through its board of directors and the school Principal.

The Catholic view of life and the mission of Christ underpins and influences all the policies and practices of the school community. The students receive formal religious education and are also encouraged to participate in a wide range of activities which seek to broaden their understanding of, and commitment to, the faith life of the Church and its service to the broader community.

In 1987, in line with other Good Samaritan Schools, Mount St Benedict College was incorporated as a Company with a board of directors. The first lay Principal was appointed in 1994. The current principal is Michael Hanratty.

== Curriculum ==
The Mount St Benedict Laptop Program began in 2010, providing girls in Years 9 and 11 with their own laptop. This was extended to Years 9–12 in 2011 and further extended to the whole school in 2012.

== Activities ==
=== Co-curricular activities ===
- Future Problem Solving
- Da Vinci Decathlon
- Tournament of Minds
- Debating & Public Speaking
- Mock Trial
- Dance Ensemble
- College Choir
- Chamber Ensemble
- Concert Band

=== Sports ===
Mount St Benedict College offers students the opportunity to participate in sport at a representative level as well as in co-curricular teams. In addition all students in Years 7–10 participate in a fortnightly Physical Activity program.

== Community ==
Mount St Benedict College has many community avenues. Besides the Parents' and Friends', the Ex-students' Association and the partners with the Good Samaritan causes (Mater Dei School in Narellan, Kiribati, Bacalod Kinder School in the Philippines, and Railaco High School in East Timor), students are involved in many community activities:

- Caritas Australia through work with Project Compassion during Lent
- Vinnes CEO Winter Sleepout
- Social Justice
- Reconciliation Week
- Refugee and Asylum Seekers Week
- Make a Difference – group of students who discuss current issues, raise awareness and take action

Students at Mount St Benedict College have established a partnership with a high school in East Timor as a way to learn about social justice in a meaningful way. Four students and two teachers took stationery, musical instruments and school supplies to help establish a high school in East Timor. This support has continued for three years.

== Notable alumnae ==
- Jordana Beatty, actress
- Joanne Carter, ice-skating
- Catherine Cox, netball
- Laura Dundovic, model and former Miss Universe Australia
- Jackie Fairweather (née Gallagher), triathlon and long-distance running
- Jaclyn Moriarty, author
- Liane Moriarty, author
- Christina Parie, X Factor 2011 top six contestant
- Jana Pittman, athlete
- Larissa Takchi, Masterchef winner

== See also ==
- List of Catholic schools in New South Wales
- Catholic education in Australia
