= Sophie Serafino =

Australian violinist and composer

Sophie Armstrong
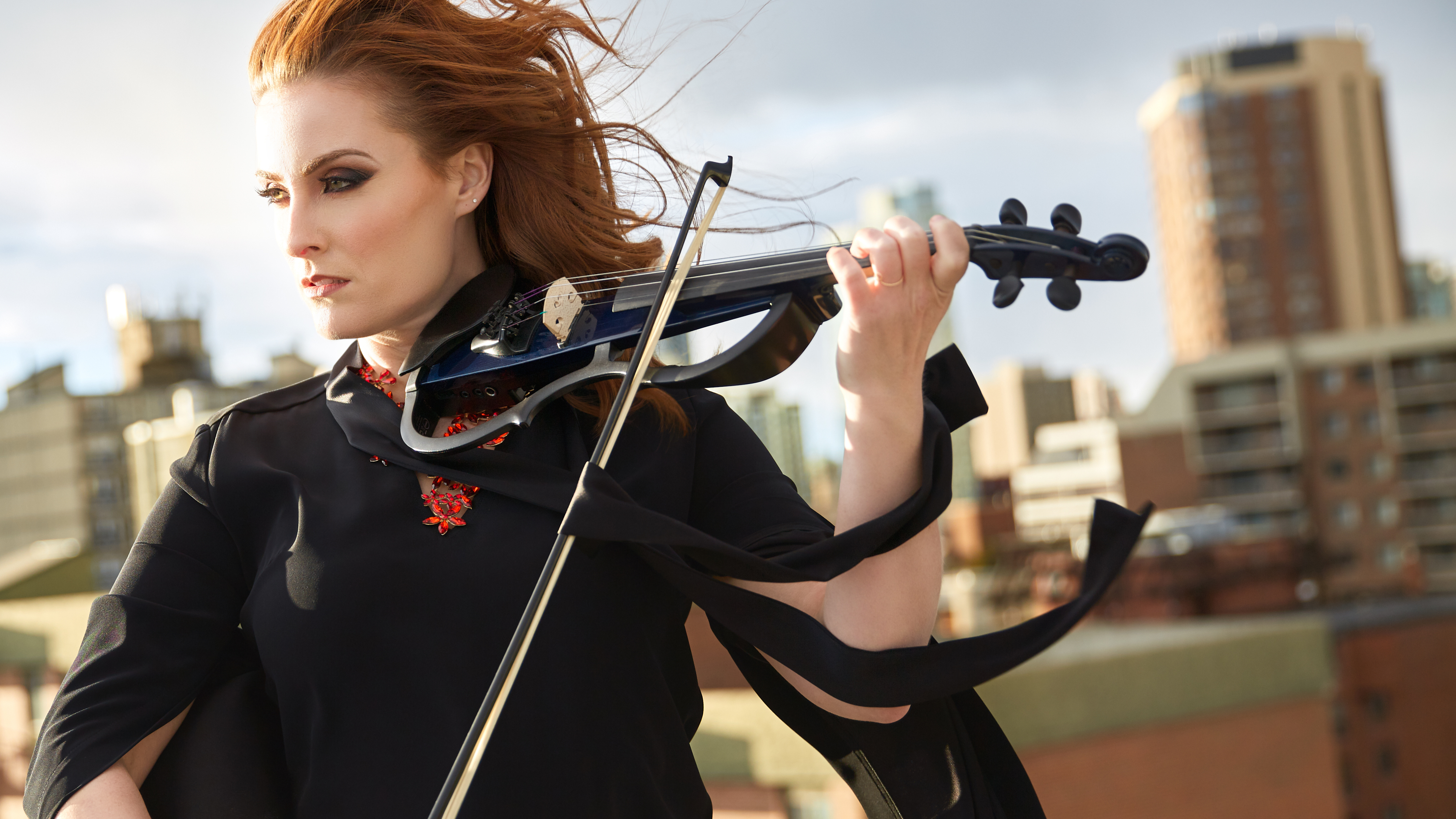
- Born: 19 October 1980 (age 46); United Kingdom
- Education: Pymble Ladies College; Sydney Conservatorium of Music
- Occupations: Violinist, musician
- Title: Founder of Every Woman Foundation
- Spouses: John Serafino (m. 2001; div. 2010) Quincy Neufeld (m. 2010; div. 2011) Dionysius David (m. 2014)
- Children: 3
- Musical career
- Genres: Classical crossover; world music; new age instrumental music; pop
- Instrument: Violin
- Website: sophiearmstrong.ca

Sophie Armstrong (born 19 October 1980) formerly known as Sophie Serafino, is a Canada-based Australian violinist and composer. She is the founder of the Every Woman Foundation.

== Early life and education ==
Sophie was born in the United Kingdom and raised in Sydney, Australia, Sophie attended Pymble Ladies College prior to studying music at Sydney Conservatorium.

== Career ==
Sophie has a Bachelor of Music Performance (Violin Major) from Sydney Conservatorium of Music in 2009, a Licentiate of Music Performance in Violin Performance (2009) from Australian Music Examinations Board.

Sophie became known for her signature style of performance, noted for her movement, connection with the audience, passionate style of playing the violin and her long red hair. Sophie has toured and performed all over the world, in locations including Sydney, Melbourne, Brisbane, London, Amsterdam, Paris, Rome, Sardinia, Hamburg, Istanbul, Casablanca, Bahrain, Dubai, Delhi, Tokyo, Pennsylvania and Los Angeles. She has performed for royalty including HRH Prince Frederick and Princess Mary of Denmark.

2002-2004, Sophie released her first album, Sophie Serafino, which she performed at venues in Sydney, Australia. Following that, she quickly followed up with the EP Carmen in 2003, which was launched nationally with a television campaign. In 2004, Sophie took the role of ‘Velma’ in Chicago, which was shown at the Zenith Theatre in Sydney, Australia. In the same year, Sophie released the EP Give it to Me independently at a sold out launch show at the Metro Theatre in Sydney Australia.

Her musical style is self-described as a fusion of exotic rhythms and melodies, and many of the audio samples on her site are a composite of world music, electronic pop and classical music. Sophie has become known for mixing styles, singing and playing her own music, described by the Daily Telegraph Australia as "inimitable." During this time Sophie performed for other artists, appearing on Australian television with Josh Groban, at Sydney Opera House with Goldfrapp and recording for artists including the Hoodoo Gurus Purity of Essence (Hoodoo Gurus album).

In 2011, Sophie released the singles Liquid Crystal, Varna, and I Still Call Australia Home.

2010-2013, Sophie released her CD The Gold Violin at a performance at Sydney Opera House in May 2010, and in 2011 moved to Calgary, Canada. In Canada, Sophie collaborated with artists and producers including Dan Hill, Amy Sky, Dan Davidson of Tupelo Honey, and Rob Wells and Pavlo. Sophie recorded the albums Touch and Temptress in 2013. Temptress was released in December 2014, and Touch was released in January 2015. In October 2015, a Lullaby album entitled Kissed by the Moon was released, followed by The Journey in 2016.

In 2021, Sophie was involved in a major car accident that caused significant injuries to her right shoulder. After an attempt to return to the stage in 2022, she subsequently underwent three surgeries and returned to work in 2024. During her time off stage, Sophie completed a children's book, The Music Thief in collaboration with British artist Pearl Bates. The book was released in October 2024 in partnership with Autism Okanagan.

=== Collaborations ===
Sophie performed on the Hoodoo Gurus album Purity of Essence (released 2010)

Sophie has performed live with Chantal Kreviazuk, Jarvis Church, Clifton Murray and Fraser Walters (The Canadian Tenors), Dan Hill, Keshia Chanté, the Mississauga Youth Theatre.

== Awards ==
- Global Television Canada Women of Vision Edmonton Award (2014)
- Women of Inspiration Awards- Cultural Ambassador 2017

== Philanthropy ==
=== The Every Woman Foundation ===
Sophie founded the Every Woman Foundation (2008–2018). She served as President of the Foundation in both Canada and the United States. Sophie actively worked within the Foundation’s outreach programs, particularly in music, writing, and teen mentorship. She also partially funded the 2011, 2012, and 2013 Festivals and remained an active board member throughout the Foundation’s operation, which ceased in 2018.

=== Ovarian Cancer Canada ===
Sophie is a spokesperson for Ovarian Cancer Canada, which is the only registered Canadian charity solely dedicated to overcoming ovarian cancer. Sophie has spoken and performed at numerous events on behalf of the charity including The Calgary Women’s Show in 2012, The Ovarian Cancer Walk of Hope Edmonton 2013 which Sophie co-emceed with Global Television presenter Nicola Crosbie, and Sophie also appeared in the 2014 Public Service Awareness Announcement on Global Television.

=== Other Charitable Contributions ===
Sophie joined other celebrities on the catwalk at the Heart Truth Fashion Show Calgary in support of the Heart & Stroke Foundation of Alberta in 2012, and 2014, and regularly donates her time, and services as a speaker and performer to charities she supports, including the Canadian Foundation for Women’s Health Gala in 2013, and the Purple Heart Gala for Discovery House Calgary.

== Personal life ==
Sophie was married to Australian fashion designer John Serafino from 2001 to 2010 (divorced). In 2014, Sophie married Canadian Dionysius David, and they have three children together: a son, Alexander, and two daughters, Victoria and Olivia.

== Discography ==
- Colliding Worlds (Album) released 2004
- Varna (single) released 2011
- The Gold Violin (EP) released 2011
- Liquid Crystal (single) released 2011
- Who and What She Wants (single) released 2014
- Temptress (Album) released 2014
- Touch (Album) released 2015
- Kissed By the Moon (Album) released 2015
- Casablanca (single) released 2016
- The Journey (formerly named Temptress) re-released 2016
- Unvanquished (single) released 2019
- Christmas Classics (Album) released 2019
- Army of Me (Single) released 2020
- Trapeze (2022)
- Via Dolorosa (2024)
