= Betty Archdale =

English-Australian educator and cricketer (1907–2000)

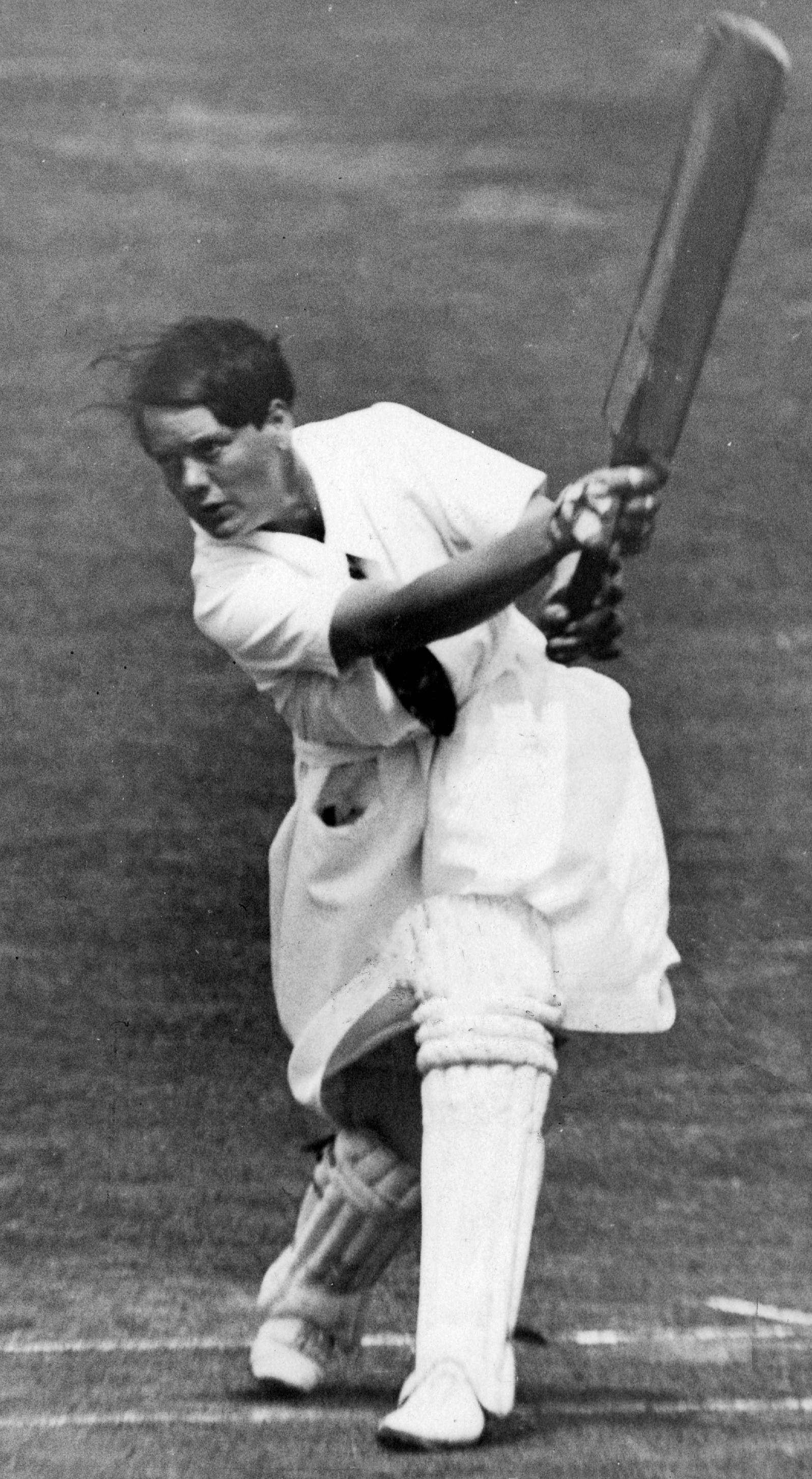

Personal information
- Full name: Helen Elizabeth Archdale
- Born: 21 August 1907; Paddington, London, England
- Died: 1 January 2000 (aged 92); Killara, New South Wales, Australia
- Nickname: Betty
- Batting: Right-handed
- Role: Batter
- Relatives: Helen Archdale (mother); Alexander Archdale (brother)

International information
- National side: England (1934–1937)
- Test debut (cap 1): 28 December 1934 v Australia
- Last Test: 13 July 1937 v Australia

Domestic team information
- Years: Team
- 1937: Kent

Career statistics
Competition	WTest	WFC
Matches	5	13
Runs scored	133	266
Batting average	26.60	15.64
100s/50s	0/0	0/0
Top score	32*	32*
Catches/stumpings	1/–	2/–
- Source: CricketArchive, 12 March 2021

Helen Elizabeth Archdale (21 August 1907 – 11 January 2000) was an English-Australian sportswoman and educator. She was the inaugural Test captain of the England women's cricket team in 1934. A qualified barrister and Women's Royal Naval Service veteran, she moved to Australia in 1946 to become principal of The Women's College at the University of Sydney. She later served as headmistress of Abbotsleigh, a private girls' school in Sydney, and was an inaugural member of the Australian Council for the Arts.

== Early life ==
Archdale was born in London, the daughter of Helen Archdale (née Russel), a suffragette who was at one time jailed for smashing windows at Whitehall and was later renowned as a leading British feminist. Her father was an Irish professional soldier in the British Army, who died in World War I when Archdale was eleven. Her godmother was Emmeline Pankhurst. Archdale attended Bedales School in Hampshire where she learned to play cricket and, thence, to St Leonards School in St Andrews, Fife.

=== Cricket ===
Archdale played as a right-handed batter and appeared in five Test matches for England between 1934 and 1937. She was the first captain of England, leading the team on their first tour of Australia and New Zealand in 1934/35. The tour was initiated by Australian captain Margaret Peden, who like Archdale was a Christian Scientist; their mothers had previously corresponded. Peden contacted Archdale via her sister Barbara Peden, then working in England as an architect, and asked her to organise the England team for the tour.

Archdale also played domestic cricket for various regional teams, as well as Kent.

== Career ==
After school, Archdale attended McGill University in Montreal, graduating in 1929 with a BA in economics and political science. She studied law in London. Specialising in international law, she conducted part of her studies in the Soviet Union. In 1938, she was called to the Bar at Gray's Inn.

During World War II, she served in the WRNS as a wireless operator in Singapore, arriving in July 1941 at the head of a group of forty Wrens trained in wireless telegraphy. She was awarded an Order of the British Empire for helping nurses escape from the conflict.

Having moved to Australia, in 1946 she was appointed principal of Sydney University's "Women's College", a post she held for 10 years. Archdale was a member of the University Senate for 25 years, and a television and radio personality throughout the 1960s.

Archdale was headmistress of the private girls school Abbotsleigh in Wahroonga, Sydney for 12 years from 1958. She was credited with breaking down the rigid system of discipline at the school, introducing sex education, and abandoning gloves and hats as part of the school uniform. She also reformed the curriculum, introducing physics and cutting back on British, in favour of Australian, history. The Assembly Hall (1963) and Chapel (1965) both date from that time. She lived on an estate in Galston, Sydney, with her brother Alexander Archdale, an actor.

In June 1968, Archdale was named as an inaugural member of the Australian Council for the Arts.

== Personal life ==
Archdale was raised as an adherent of Christian Science, which her mother had credited with fixing her own health issues. She converted to Anglicanism in the 1950s under the influence of her friend Felix Arnott. She was also influenced by an incident where a Christian Science hospice refused to care for her mother, on the grounds she had visited a hospital following a heart attack in violation of the denomination's restrictions on medical treatment.

== Honours and legacy ==
In 1997, she was listed as a National Living Treasure. In March 1999, Archdale was one of the first ten women to be granted Honorary Life Membership of Marylebone Cricket Club in England. She died on 1 January 2000 at the age of 92, in Sydney.

The Association of Heads of Independent Girls' Schools "Archdale Debating" competition, involving Sydney's private and Catholic girls' schools, is named in her honour.
