= Jenny Coupland =

Jenny Coupland (born 1961) was awarded the title Miss Australia in 1982. She was also Miss New South Wales the same year. She was married to Angus Martin in 1987.

Her father was a surgeon, Professor Graham Coupland. She spent her early years in Lindfield, New South Wales and attended Pymble Ladies College.
