= Gillian Moore (headteacher) =

Australian educator

Gillian Margaret Moore AO is a retired Australian school principal.

Moore began her career in Perth, Western Australia. Her first teaching position was at Tuart Hill, where she taught in a high school from 1967 to 1971. She then took up a lecturing position at Mount Lawley College of Advanced Education, from 1972 to 1982, followed by the role of deputy principal of Methodist Ladies' College, Claremont from 1983 to 1988.

From 1989 to 2007, Moore was the principal of Pymble Ladies' College in Sydney. Moore also served the Association of Heads of Independent Girls' Schools at both national and state level in a number of roles during her career.

In 2007, she was appointed an officer of the Order of Australia for service to education and her contribution to the independent schools' sector.
