= Nancy Jobson =

Australian teacher and headmistress (1880–1964)

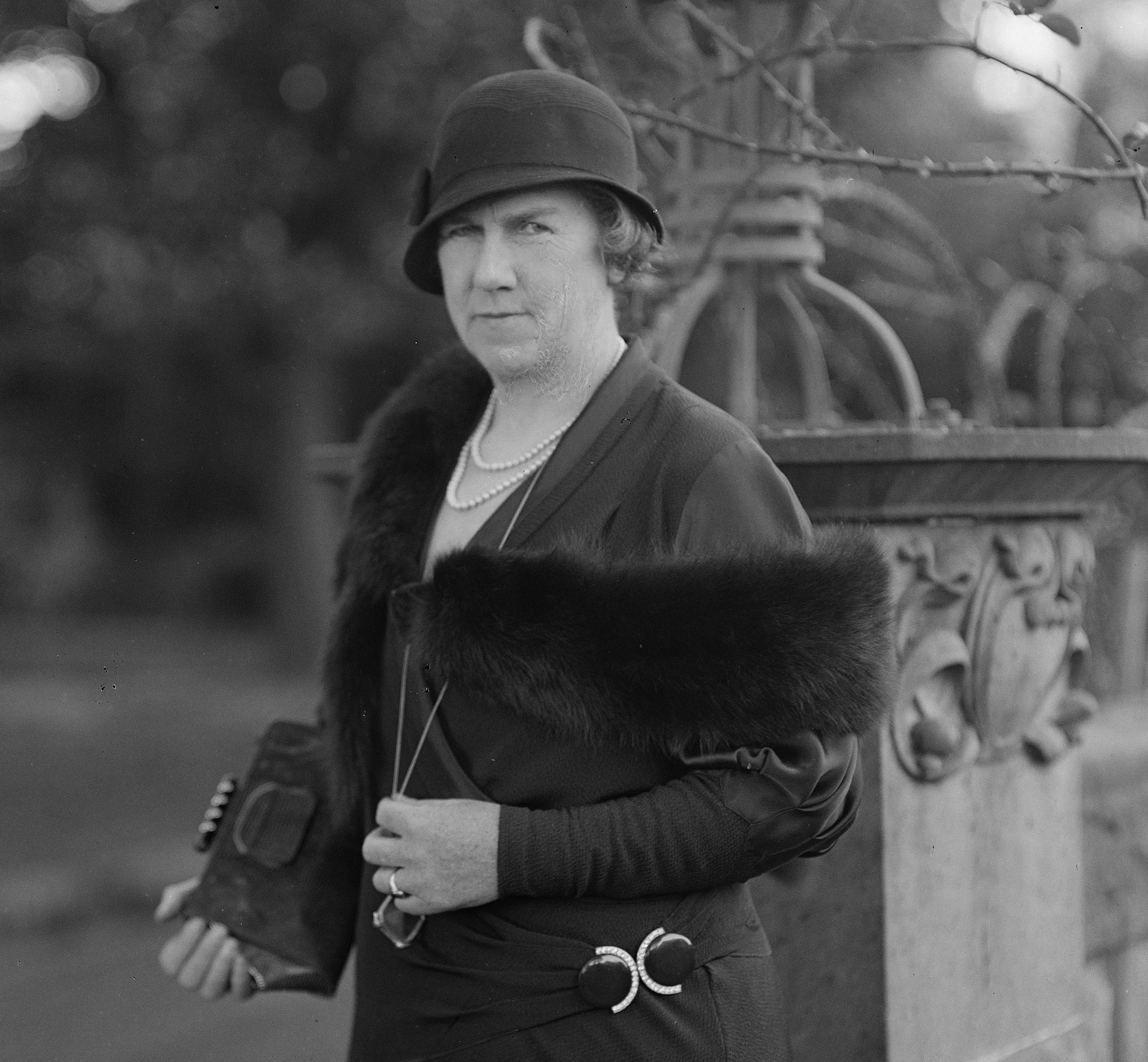
- Nancy Jobson 1933
- Born: 17 April 1880; Sydney
- Died: 22 June 1964 (aged 84)
- Occupations: teacher and headmistress
- Known for: advocate for domestic education for girls

Nancy Jobson MBE (17 April 1880 – 22 June 1964) was an Australian teacher and headmistress. She attended the Presbyterian Ladies' College, Melbourne and in time became the head of Pymble Ladies' College.

== Biography ==
Jobson was born at Clunes, Victoria in 1880 to Christopher Jobson, a merchant from Northumberland, England, and his second wife Elizabeth Cameron, née McColl, from Scotland. Jobson attended Presbyterian Ladies' College, Melbourne and in 1897 she began university studies at the University of Melbourne. She completed a bachelor of arts degree in 1900, with honours in classics and philology, and a master of arts degree in 1902.

Following her graduation, she returned to Presbyterian Ladies' College as sports mistress, and in 1920 moved to Invercargill, New Zealand, to take up the position of headmistress of Southland Girls' High School. She held the position until 1919, when she moved to Wellington, becoming the first principal of Queen Margaret College. Two years later she moved to Queensland to become headmistress of Fairholme Presbyterian Girls' College in Toowoomba.

In 1921, she moved again, to Sydney, and became principal of the Presbyterian Ladies' College in Pymble after the resignation of Gladys Gordon Everett.

During Jobson's tenure the school experienced significant change; enrolments increased from 256 in 1921 to 414 in 1929 and the number of boarders from 95 to 161, however the Great Depression later caused a slump in enrolments to only 208 by 1932. Jobson left the school in mid-1933 with a negotiated redundancy settlement following a disagreement with the school council over proposed downsizing measures prompted by the economic downturn. She was succeeded by the Scottish born Grace Mackintosh who had been a head in New Zealand.

In 1934, Jobson founded Hopewood House, a finishing school for girls which taught homecraft and secretarial studies. The school closed in 1943 and Jobson went to teach for the International Correspondence Schools.

Throughout her years in headmistress positions, Jobson advocated for domestic education for girls and focused on encouraging girls towards excellence in home management, the cultivation of manners and artistic sense. She introduced courses in domestic science and music. She also wanted girls to have an ethic of community service and the schools she ran were involved with welfare work in hospitals and Christian organisations.

Jobson was appointed a Member of the Order of the British Empire in 1955, for services to education in Australia. She died on 22 June 1964.

Jobson Place, in the Canberra suburb of Chisholm, is named in her honour.
