= Every Woman Foundation =

- Nickname: Every Woman Festival, Every Woman Organization
- Formation: 2011
- Founder: Sophie Armstrong (Serafino)
- Founded at: Australia
- Region served: Sydney, Calgary, Edmonton

The Every Woman Foundation (EWF) is a non-profit women’s organization that works to provide outreach programs and community events to women of all ages, circumstances and backgrounds. EWF also celebrates International Women’s Day annually with their signature event, Every Woman Festival. Every Woman Foundation was founded in Australia in 2011 and was launched in Canada in 2012, operating under the name Every Woman Festival and Every Woman Organization, a Division of Sophie Serafino Entertainment until achieving status as a non profit society in Canada in 2014.

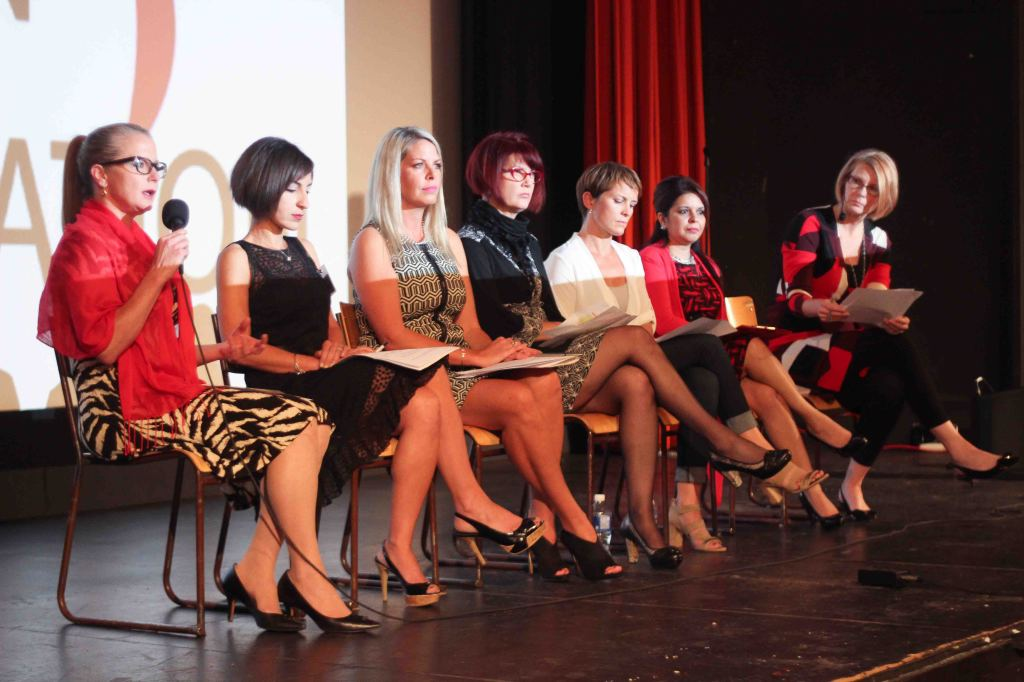
Every Woman Foundation Miss Representation Screening Calgary

EWF was founded by British-Australian violinist Sophie Armstrong (formerly Sophie Serafino), and has presences in Sydney, Calgary, and Edmonton.

Every Woman Foundation released an all female compilation CD through Peter Malick’s, US Label Luxury Wafers in 2014, which includes tracks by performers Tara Slone, Amy Sky and Sophie Armstrong.
