= Pymble Ladies' College =

School in Pymble, New South Wales, Australia

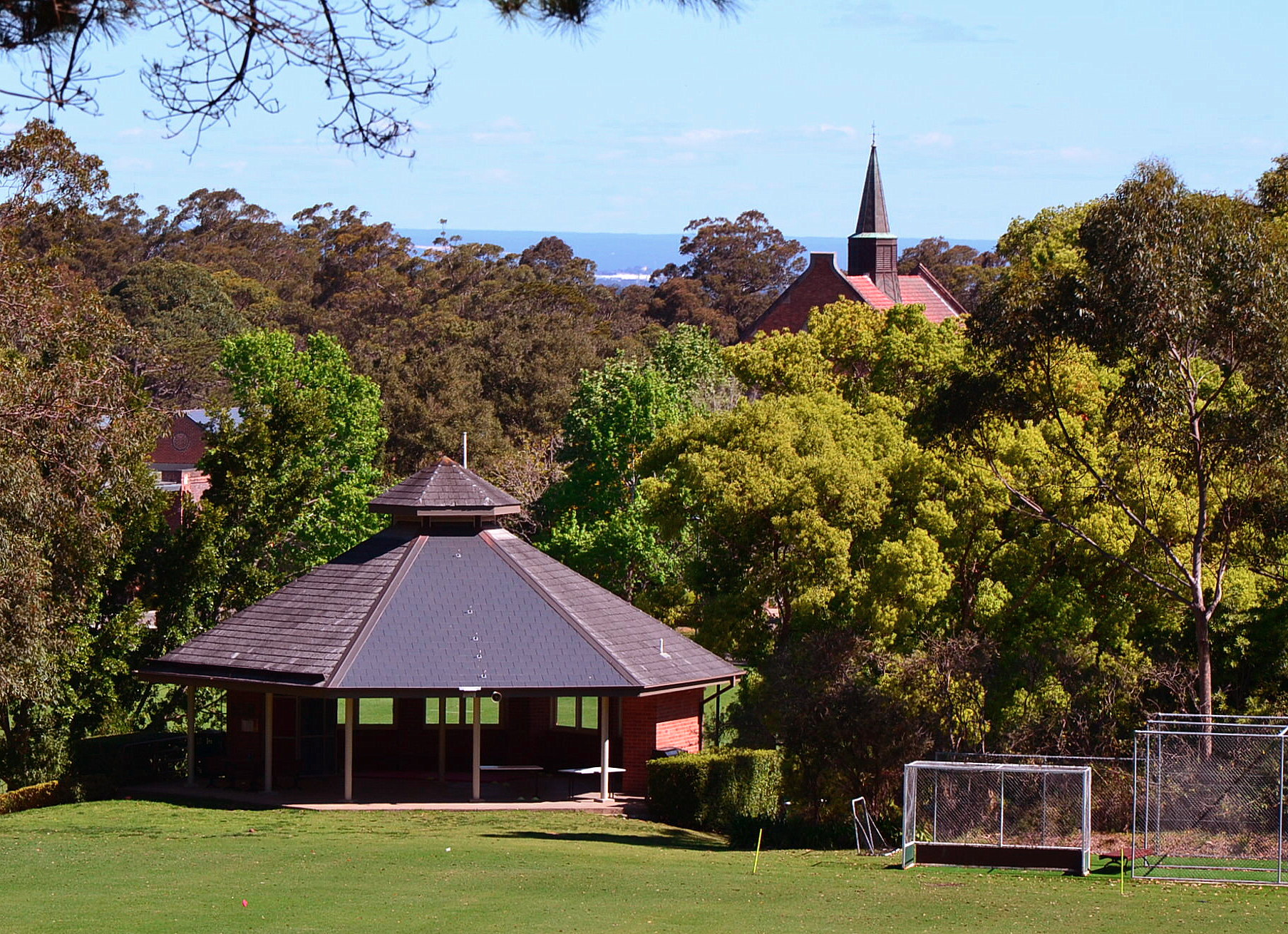

Location
- Pymble, New South Wales; Australia; 33°44′50″S 151°08′09″E

Information
- Type: Independent, day and boarding
- Motto: All' Ultimo Lavoro (Strive for the highest —Dante)
- Denomination: Uniting Church
- Established: 1916
- Chairman: Chris Fydler
- Principal: Kate Hadwen
- Chaplain: Cass Blake, Danielle Hemsworth-Smith
- Employees: ~210
- Gender: Girls
- Enrolment: ~2,100 (K–12)
- Colours: Scarlet, navy blue and white
- Affiliations: AHIGS; JSHAA
- Website: www.pymblelc.nsw.edu.au

Pymble Ladies' College is an independent, non-selective, day and boarding school for girls, located in Pymble, a suburb on the Upper North Shore of Sydney, New South Wales, Australia.

== History and description ==
Pymble Ladies' College was founded in 1916 by John Marden, due to the increasing enrolments at the Presbyterian Ladies' College, Sydney, another school established by the General Assembly of the Presbyterian Church of NSW.

In 1921 Nancy Jobson became principal of the college. after the resignation of Gladys Gordon Everett.

During Jobson's tenure, enrolments increased from 256 in 1921 to 414 in 1929 and the number of boarders from 95 to 161, however the Great Depression later caused a slump in enrolments to only 208 by 1932. Jobson left the school following a disagreement with the school council over proposed downsizing measures prompted by the economic downturn. She was succeeded by the Scottish born Grace Mackintosh who had been a head in New Zealand.

Mackintosh had not been successful in New Zealand where she had suffered with the climate, her arthritis and routine decisions, Now at Pymble College she failed to impress. Younger students found her accent difficult and as the depression hit then the number of students began to fall. Mackintosh decided to introduce new ideas including her ideas about Presbyterianism. She lost her faith in 1936 and decided to resign. In July 1936 Dorothy Isabel Knox OBE AM became the school's replacement Principal. She had been the head of the Presbyterian Ladies’ College, Orange. Knox was at the college until she retired in 1967 having overseen the expansion of the school during her leadership. During Knox's final year the Wyndham scheme was introduced that restructured secondary education encouraging comprehensive education in New South Wales. Knox approved of the changes.

In 2008, five students from years 8 to 9 were expelled for "sniffing aerosol fumes" on school grounds. In 2017, a student at PLC was reported to have been allegedly groomed by a convicted criminal through social media platform Snapchat, who bought her a plane ticket to the United States. The student was "[found] safe" in the United States through a collaboration between Australian and US law enforcement, and returned to Sydney, prompting conversations surrounding cyber safety for children on social media. In 2022, the school faced controversy following the leak of an unsanctioned explicit and extreme "Year 12 muck-up day" plans made by students at the school. In 2024, PLC received negative media coverage following reports of extreme bullying towards a year 6/7 student, with the school alleged to have been "dismissive" in addressing it.

The school has historically maintained an end of year graduation tradition where year 12 students release white birds to signify "freedom" and "letting go", releasing 30 birds since 2017. In 2024, animal welfare concerns were raised regarding this tradition, with animal rights activists claiming the move increases their "risk of death from starvation, dehydration or predation". The provider of the birds stated that they are white racing pigeons with a "99 per cent" return rate.

== Description ==
The college, formerly a school of the Presbyterian Church of Australia, is now administered by the Uniting Church in Australia. Girls of any faith may attend the school, although they are expected to also attend a weekly chapel service. The school caters for all classes from Kindergarten to Year 12.

Twenty hectares in size, the grounds of the college feature a 50m swimming pool, gymnasium, several fields, tennis courts, an agriculture plot, library, buildings dedicated to specific subjects: an art building, a technology and applied studies building, a languages building, and a science block. There is also a music building, a chapel, healthcare centre, three boarding houses (Lang, Goodlet and Marden) and the most recent additions – the Gillian Moore Centre for Performing Arts in 2005, the Senior School Centre – Kate Mason Building in 2011, and the Centenary Sports Precinct in 2016.

There are eight houses in the secondary school, including the original three, Lang, Goodlet and Marden, and five more added in 2009, Wylie, Bennett, Ingleholme, Hammond and Thomas. There are three houses in the Preparatory and Junior Schools named after famous Australian authors, Gibbs (after May Gibbs), Mackellar (after Dorothea Mackellar) and Turner (after Ethel Turner). Recently, the preparatory and junior schools have transitioned into the eight houses of Marden, Lang, Goodlet, Wylie, Bennett, Ingleholme, Hammond and Thomas – Gibbs, Mackellar and Turner houses no longer exist after only 8 years in existence.

== Activities ==
Pymble Ladies' College is a founding member of the Association of Heads of Independent Girls' Schools (AHIGS).

== Principals ==
No.	Portrait	Principal	Term	Details	Ref.
1		John Marden	1916–1920	Principal of Croydon 1887–1920, Principal of both Colleges from 1916, founder of the college	
2		G. Gordon Everett	1920–1921		
3		Nancy Jobson	1922–1933		
4		Grace Mackintosh	1933–1936		
5		Dorothy Knox	1936–1967		
6		Jeanette Buckham	1967–1989		
7		Gillian Moore	1989–2007		
8		Vicki Waters	2008–2019		
9		Kate Hadwen	2019–present		

== School Performance ==
The Sydney Morning Herald ranked Pymble Ladies' College the 20th highest performing school in NSW in 2022 based on their HSC Success Rate, up from 25th in 2021.

Additionally, Pymble Ladies' College was included in The Schools Index list of the world's 150 best private schools, and among the top 5 Australasian schools for 2025-26.

== Notable alumnae ==
=== Academics, educators, teachers ===
- Margaret Gillett (1930–2019), founder of the women's studies courses at McGill University in Canada

=== Business ===
- Vanessa Hudson – Qantas CEO

=== Entertainment, media and the arts ===
- Jenny Coupland – Miss Australia 1982
- Jacqueline McKenzie – actress, singer, artist
- Melissa Doyle – journalist
- Dame Joan Hammond – soprano, singing coach and golfer
- Amber Higlett – finance presenter/reporter and newsreader
- Kerrie Lester – artist
- Amy Lyons – internet personality active in China
- Caroline Pemberton – Miss Australia 2007
- Sarah Song – television host in Hong Kong.
- Anita Jacoby – TV and film producer (expelled)
- Alex the Astronaut – artist
- Sophie Serafino - Canada-based Australian violinist and composer.

=== Politics, public service and the law ===
- Marie Byles – first female solicitor in New South Wales, mountaineer, explorer, author and feminist (also attended the Presbyterian Ladies' College, Sydney)
- Elizabeth Evatt – judge of an Australian federal court

=== Sport ===
- Sophie Ferguson – professional tennis player
- Ellyse Perry – member of Australian women's national football team and cricket team
- Edwina Tops-Alexander – equestrian athlete representative to 2012 London Olympics
- Brittany O'Brien – Australian Olympic Diving Team 2016
- Chloe Dalton OAM – Australian Women's Rugby Sevens Team (2014–present), Olympic gold medallists
- Mackenzie Little – Olympic javelin thrower
- Sarah Hunter – Professional soccer player (2022–present)
- Zara Pasfield – figure skater
- Katie Pasfield – figure skater
- Grace Whyte – member of the NSW swifts
- Rudi Ellis - netballer

== See also ==
- List of non-government schools in New South Wales
- List of boarding schools

== Notes ==
- P.L.C council had acquired further land between 1916 and 1924. The reason for the sale is unknown.
