= List of Australian Presbyterians =

The following are notable Australian Presbyterians:

- Arthur Aspinall – co-founder and first principal of The Scots College, Bellevue Hill, Sydney; Congregational and Presbyterian minister; Joint founder of the Historical Society of New South Wales
- Jessie Aspinall – first female junior medical resident at the Royal Prince Alfred Hospital
- Peter Cameron – principal of St Andrew's College; Minister convicted by the Presbyterian Church of Australia of heresy
- Arthur Dean (judge)
- John Ferguson – Presbyterian minister; acting principal of St Andrew's Theological College; senior chaplain and chairman of the Presbyterian Ladies' College, Sydney Council
- John Flynn – founder of the Royal Flying Doctor Service and the Australian Inland Mission
- James Forbes – minister of the Free Presbyterian Church of Victoria and founder of the Melbourne Academy, a college for boys (later Scotch College).
- Friedrich Hagenauer – Presbyterian minister; founder of Ramahyuck Mission to house the members of the Ganai tribe who survived attacks in west and central Gippsland
- Allan Harman – principal of the Presbyterian Theological College
- Rev. Dr Andrew Harper – Biblical scholar and teacher
- Nora Hood (c. 1836–1871), Aboriginal Australian religious figure
- Matthew Guy – Victorian Leader of the Opposition
- Adrian Kebbe – former weightlifter
- John Dunmore Lang (1799–1878) – Presbyterian minister, writer, politician and activist
- Dr. John Marden – first Headmaster of the Presbyterian Ladies' College, Sydney; Pioneer of women's education; Presbyterian elder
- John McGarvie – Presbyterian minister and writer
- William McIntyre – first Gaelic-speaking minister in Australia; educator
- Dr Ewen Neil McQueen – second headmaster of the Presbyterian Ladies' College, Sydney; Prominent educational innovator; Scientist; Psychologist; General Practitioner
- Sir Robert Menzies – Australian prime minister
- Reverend William Miller – minister of the Free Presbyterian Church of Victoria
- David Charles Mitchell - lawyer, minister and solicitor-general of Lesotho.
- Sibyl Enid Vera Munro Morrison – first female barrister in New South Wales
- Robert Bruce Plowman - the first patrol padre for the Australian Inland Mission
- William Ridley – English Presbyterian missionary who studied Australian Aboriginal languages
- Robert Steel – 19th-century Scottish/Australian minister and religious author
- Joan Sutherland – operatic soprano (Australian by birth; parents were of Scottish Presbyterian descent)
- Reverend F. R. M. Wilson – early pioneer lichenologist and minister
- Bruce W. Winter – principal of Queensland Theological College

== See also ==
- Presbyterian Church of Australia
