= Dorsch =

Dorsch may refer to:

Surname

- Niklas Dorsch, German footballer
- Käthe Dorsch (1890–1957), German actress
- Franz Xaver Dorsch (1899–1986), German civil engineer
- Susan Dorsch (born 1935), Australian physician and educator
- Travis Dorsch, American football player

Other

- Dorsch's White Cross Bakery, listed on the National Register of Historic Places in Washington, D.C.
