= List of Old Girls of PLC Sydney =

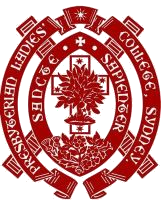

This is a List of Old Girls of PLC Sydney, they being notable alumni – known as "P.L.C Old Girls" of the Presbyterian Church school, The Presbyterian Ladies' College, Sydney (P.L.C Sydney) in Croydon, New South Wales, Australia.

In 2001, The Sun-Herald ranked the Presbyterian Ladies' College, Sydney fourth in Australia's top ten girls' schools, based on the number of its alumni mentioned in the Who's Who in Australia (a listing of notable Australians).

== Academic ==
- Silma Ihram (née Frances Anne Beaumont; Class of 1971) – Pioneer of Islamic education; Founder of Noor Al Houda Islamic College and Al Noori Primary School; Democrats candidate for Auburn; Author; Secretary–General of the Australian Council for Islamic Education (also attended Meriden School)
- Eunice Macindoe (Winner of the Ex–students prize 1921; Class of 1921) – Educator; Former Principal of P.L.C Sydney and the Women's College at the University of Queensland
- Professor Elizabeth Webby AM (née Loder; Class of 1953) – Author; Chair of Australian Literature, School of English at the University of Sydney; Recipient Centenary Medal 2001, AA Phillips Award for the Study of Australian literature 2003

== Community and philanthropy ==
- Millicent Baxter (née Brown) – New Zealand pacifist and peace activist.
- Mary, Lady Fairfax AC, AM, OBE, FAICD – Mother of Warwick Fairfax; Philanthropist; Chairman, Founder and President of Friends of the Australian Ballet

== Entertainment, media and the arts ==
- Rachel Corbett (Class of 1998) – contestant on Big Brother Australia series one, former radio presenter for Triple M Melbourne
- Olive Crane (Class of 1900) – sketcher and illustrator
- Gladys Harding Froggatt – author of the World of little lives (1916) and More about the world of little lives (1929); Daughter of Walter Wilson Froggatt
- Fenella Kernebone (Class of 1993) – radio presenter for Triple J
- Johanna Pigott (Class of 1972) – musician, song and television writer, co-writer of the Australian children's television series, Mortified, co-writer of the John Farnham song Age of Reason
- Margaret Pomeranz AM (née Owen; Class of 1961) – film critic, former host of SBS's The Movie Show, host of ABC TV's At the Movies
- Sue Smith – model, television and radio journalist, first female reporter on the Nine Network's A Current Affair, and Logie Award winner
- Leilah Waddell – violinist and music teacher.
- Angela Webber (School Captain and PLC Gold Medallion winner 1972; Class of 1972) – broadcaster, author, comedian and television writer, creator/co-writer of the Australian television series, Mortified and Blue Water High

== Journalism ==
- Geraldine Walsh 1940–2023 – Wife of Max Walsh AM and chair of the Sydney Morning Herald letters pages from 1990 until 1999

== Medicine and science ==
- Jessie Strahorn Aspinall (Class of 1891) – first female junior resident medical officer at Royal Prince Alfred Hospital (also attended Kambala School)
- Sue Denison OAM (née Brown) – one of the first two Nurse Practitioners in Australia; Awarded an OAM for services to Nursing and the Nundle district
- Professor Susan Dorsch (School Captain, Dux, and winner of the Ex-students prize 1951; Class of 1951) – Emeritus professor; pioneer of transplantation immunology. First woman appointed to a Professorship in the faculty of Medicine (USYD). Pro-Vice Chancellor and Deputy Vice-Chancellor at the University of Sydney
- Marie Montgomerie Hamilton (Dux and winner of the Ex-students prize 1908; Class of 1908) – pioneering pathologist; Hockey player

== Politics, public service and the law ==
- Helen Bauer – Director General of Industrial Relations and Director General of Community Services
- Marie Byles – first practicing female solicitor in NSW, Mountaineer, explorer, Author and Feminist (also attended Pymble Ladies' College)
- Louise McBride (Class of 1975) – barrister, Ground Floor Wentworth Chambers; Former Director of Grant Samuel and Partner at Deloitte Touche Tohmatsu and Clayton Utz; Daughter of Dr. William McBride
- Sibyl Enid Vera Munro Morrison (née Gibbs) – admitted to the NSW bar in 1924, first female practising Barrister in NSW; Wife of architect, Carlyle Greenwell
- Kerry Nettle (School Captain 1991; Class of 1991) – former Australian Greens Senator for New South Wales
- Hon. Justice Carolyn Chalmers Simpson – Judge of the Supreme Court of New South Wales
- Rosemary Edna Sinclair AO (née Fenton) – Australian Government appointed Delegate to the United Nations Special Session on Children (New York City) 2002; Miss Australia 1960

== Sport ==
- Kate Bates – Commonwealth Games Gold Medallist (Melbourne 2006– Cycling) and current Cycling World Points Race Champion (also attended Tara Anglican School for Girls)
- Nanette Duncan (Harper House Captain 1965; Class of 1965) – Olympic swimmer (Tokyo 1964)
- Jennifer Emerson – rowing world championship gold medallist
- Elizabeth Fraser – Olympic medallist (Melbourne 1956 – Swimming)
- Emma Johnson (School Vice-Captain 1996; Class of 1997) – Olympic medallist (Atlanta 1996 – Swimming)
- Nicole Kriz (Class of 2001) – professional tennis player
- Nicole Ng (Class of 2000) – Australian diver
- Julia Veness-Collins – national and world championship rower
- Meg Wade – equestrian endurance champion and the first person to win the 100-mile Tom Quilty Gold Cup four times.
- Annabelle Williams (School Vice-Captain 2006; Class of 2006) – Commonwealth Games Medallist (Melbourne 2006 – Swimming); Current world-record holder of the EAD 100m freestyle (S9 classification)
- Karen Brancourt (Anderson Vice-Captain 1979; Class of 1979) – Australian rower, Olympic Games Bronze medallist 1984
- Kaitlin Nobbs (Class of 2015) – Australian hockey player, current captain of the Hockeyroos
