= Peter Blayney =

Peter Blayney may refer to:

- Peter W. M. Blayney (born 1944), British independent scholar
- Peter Michael Blayney (1920–2014), Australian artist
