= Jessie Aspinall =

Australian doctor (1880–1953)

Jessie Strahorn Aspinall
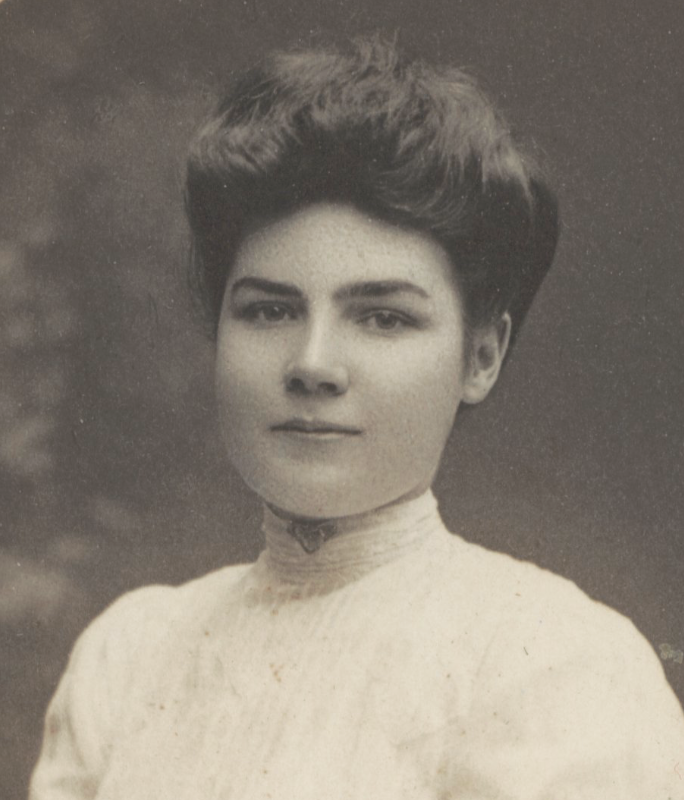
- Born: 10 December 1880; Forbes, New South Wales, Australia
- Died: 25 August 1953 (aged 71); Haberfield, New South Wales
- Education: Presbyterian Ladies' College, Sydney; Riviere College; Kambala; University of Sydney
- Years active: 1906-?
- Known for: First female junior medical resident at Royal Prince Alfred Hospital
- Relatives: Arthur Aspinall
- Medical career
- Profession: General Practitioner
- Institutions: Royal Prince Alfred Hospital; General Hospital, Hobart; Crown Street Women's Hospital; The Scots College

Jessie Strahorn Aspinall (10 December 1880 – 25 August 1953) was the first female junior medical resident at the Royal Prince Alfred Hospital, Camperdown, Sydney.

== Early life and education ==
Jessie Aspinall was born in Forbes, New South Wales, the only daughter of the Rev. Arthur Aspinall and his wife Helen. Upon moving to Sydney she studied at the Presbyterian Ladies' College, Sydney, Riviere College and Kambala before earning her Bachelor of Medicine and Master of Surgery from the University of Sydney. Her four brothers were also medical doctors.

== Professional career ==
In 1906 Aspinall applied for residency at the Royal Prince Alfred Hospital (RPA), but her application was initially rejected by the board. Her father took up her cause and had a long letter published in the Sydney Morning Herald early in February. This drew the attention of the public and of many different groups to the rejection of Jessie's application by the hospital, with one commentator concluding that:

Miss Aspinall will pass into history as a noble martyr, while the men who threw her out will be bracketed with Bloody Jeffreys, Torquemada and Judas Iscariot.

Amid protests from Women's Rights Groups and intense media scrutiny, the board reversed its decision on 2 May. She practiced at RPA until June 1907, when she was appointed the junior house surgeon at the General Hospital, Hobart. In 1908 Jessie was appointed Resident Medical Officer of the Crown Street Women's Hospital, Sydney, and would progress to become Medical Superintendent of the institution. Eventually Jessie moved into private practice, and had consulting rooms at Lyon's Terrace and Macquarie Street, both in central Sydney. Aspinall also served as the school doctor for The Scots College.

== Family and later life ==
On 22 June 1915, Aspinall married mining engineer Ambrose William Freeman, to whom she bore 4 children: two sons and two daughters, one of whom married the Australian artist, Peter Michael Blayney. The family spent two periods living in Malaya; she was widowed in 1930.

Aspinall was actively involved with the Sydney executive of the Victoria League, the National Council of Women and the appeals committee of the Young Women's Christian Association.

== Death ==
Aspinall died of arteriosclerosis. Her ashes were interred in the family grave at the South Head Cemetery. Obituaries to her appeared in the Sydney Morning Herald and in The Medical Journal of Australia.

Jessie Aspinall is cited as one of the first female doctors in general hospitals in Australia and her achievements challenged ingrain cultural beliefs about the position of women within society.

== See also ==
- List of Australian Presbyterians
- List of Old Girls of PLC Sydney
