= Sibyl Morrison =

Australian barrister

Sibyl Enid Vera Munro Morrison
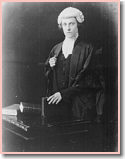
- Born: Sibyl Enid Vera Munro Gibbs; 18 August 1895; Petersham, New South Wales, Australia
- Died: 29 December 1961 (aged 66); Collaroy, New South Wales, Australia
- Education: Shirley College, Edgecliff; Presbyterian Ladies' College, Sydney; The Women's College; University of Sydney
- Known for: First female barrister in New South Wales
- Spouses: Charles Carlisle Morrison (m. 1923–1928) Carlyle Greenwell (m. 1937–1961)

Sibyl Enid Vera Munro Morrison (18 August 1895 – 29 December 1961) was the first female barrister in New South Wales, Australia. She graduated LL.B from the University of Sydney's law school in 1924.

== Early life ==
Born at Petersham, a suburb of Sydney, New South Wales, Morrison was the daughter of Charles Henry Victor Emanuel Gibbs, a Victorian-born pastoralist, and his second wife Alexandrina Caroline Elizabeth, née Munro, from Parramatta.

Morrison received her education at Shirley College, Edgecliff, and the Presbyterian Ladies' College, Sydney (P.L.C), at Croydon. She was then a resident in The Women's College while studying law at the University of Sydney, where she graduated in 1924. During her classes at Sydney's law school, she witnessed first-hand the prejudice against women in the legal profession, experiencing cat-calling and foot-stomping from her male peers.

In 1923, she took a break from her studies to visit Britain, and subsequently married a ranch owner, Charles Carlisle Morrison in London on 1 October of that year. Returning to Sydney, she completed her law course and on 2 June 1924 was admitted to the New South Wales Bar, where she became the first woman to practise.

== Career ==
In Morrison's first appearance as a barrister, she was to act for a plaintiff widow claiming under the Testator's Family Maintenance and Guardianship of Infants Act. She successfully established herself at the Bar and was on occasions briefed by fellow pioneering female lawyers, Christian Jollie Smith and Marie Byles (also a school friend from her P.L.C days), both of whom had been admitted as solicitors in 1924.

With her solid legal knowledge, Morrison was welcomed as a member of the National Council of Women of New South Wales, and was convener of their laws committee. In November 1926, she presented a paper on divorce in Australia when the National Council of Women was advocating uniform Federal marriage and divorce laws. She divorced her husband in 1928.

Returning to London in 1930, Morrison was called to the Bar of the Middle Temple in May. Back in Sydney, she remarried, this time to architect Carlyle Greenwell on 16 March 1937, at St Stephen's Presbyterian Church. She was no longer listed as a practising barrister after this marriage. In 1940 she became the first president of the Law School Comforts Fund, becoming a life vice-president in 1942. She was also involved with what became the Business and Professional Women's Club of Sydney.

Although Sibyl Morrison had been in competition with male colleagues throughout her career, it is said that she never lost her femininity, with a magazine noting that she was "an exceedingly smart up-to-date frocker".

== Death ==
Morrison died of cancer at Collaroy in Sydney on 29 December 1961, and was cremated with Anglican rites. She never had children.

From an estate valued at £72,011, she made two bequests of £1000 for annual prizes or scholarships in the faculty of law to be named after her mother and herself. After several other bequests, she left the residue to the University of Sydney, to be known as the 'Sibyl Greenwell Bequest' to support the small animal section of the Rural Veterinary Centre at Camden.

== See also ==
- List of Australian Presbyterians
- List of Old Girls of PLC Sydney
