= Vietnam-Australia School, Hanoi =

Location
- Mỹ Đình 1 Residential Area; Hanoi; Vietnam

Information
- Type: Private, semi-international, coeducational, primary, secondary and high school
- Established: 2007
- Grades: 1–12
- Website: www.vashanoi.edu.vn

Vietnam-Australia School, Hanoi (VAS Hanoi) is a semi-international school established in pursuant to decision No 1452/QD-UBND dated 13 April 2007 of the People’s Committee of Hanoi.

VAS Hanoi follows the Vietnamese Curriculum in preschool, primary, secondary and high school. All sections of the school are located together on the one campus, in My Dinh 1 residential area.

With 12 years of development, VAS Hanoi is one of the leading semi-international schools in Vietnam with nearly 1200 students.

In 2013, VAS Hanoi was one of the first two schools in Hanoi to be recognized as Cambridge International School registered number VN235 by Cambridge Assessment International Education. The school has been qualified to teach three international Cambridge programs: Cambridge Primary, Cambridge Lower Secondary and Cambridge Upper Secondary – IGCSE.

In 2019, VAS Hanoi becomes the first school in Vietnam to be accredited as "Cambridge Assessment English Partnership School" by Cambridge Assessment English.

Experienced native English teachers from a variety of English-speaking nations are selected by Australian strategic partner Presbyterian Ladies' College, Sydney – PLC Sydney school, trained annually both at home and abroad, and committed to long-term, full-time employment at VAS Hanoi.

== Education model ==
=== Vietnamese curriculum (MOET) ===
VAS Hanoi follows the Vietnamese curriculum in preschool, primary, secondary and high school.

=== Cambridge curriculum ===
VAS Hanoi was one of the first two schools in Hanoi to be recognized as a Cambridge International School, registered number VN235 in 2013. To be accredited, VAS Hanoi underwent a strict process of evaluation of its teachers, curriculum and facilities. The school has been qualified to teach three international Cambridge programs:

- Cambridge Primary
- Cambridge Lower Secondary
- Cambridge Upper Secondary - IGCSE

At VAS Hanoi Preschool, children study with native-speaking teachers from 15–17 periods per week.

=== Co-curriculum ===
- After school, students participate in sports, arts, social activities, economy and language. These clubs are managed by Vietnamese and foreign teachers and some invited coaches.
- Sporting competitions, language nights, art exhibitions and performances are organized within the school.
- Each year, VAS Hanoi hosts visits of students from Australian schools. The school also sends groups of students to Australia and creates opportunities for its students to work with charity projects, sporting and music events.
- Communication in English is encouraged within the school campus.

== Partner school ==
PLC Sydney is an Australian private school established in the late 1880s on the UK model. In recent years, they both have continuously been in the top group in the New South Wales HSC School ranking.
