= John Marden =

Australian headmaster (1855–1924)

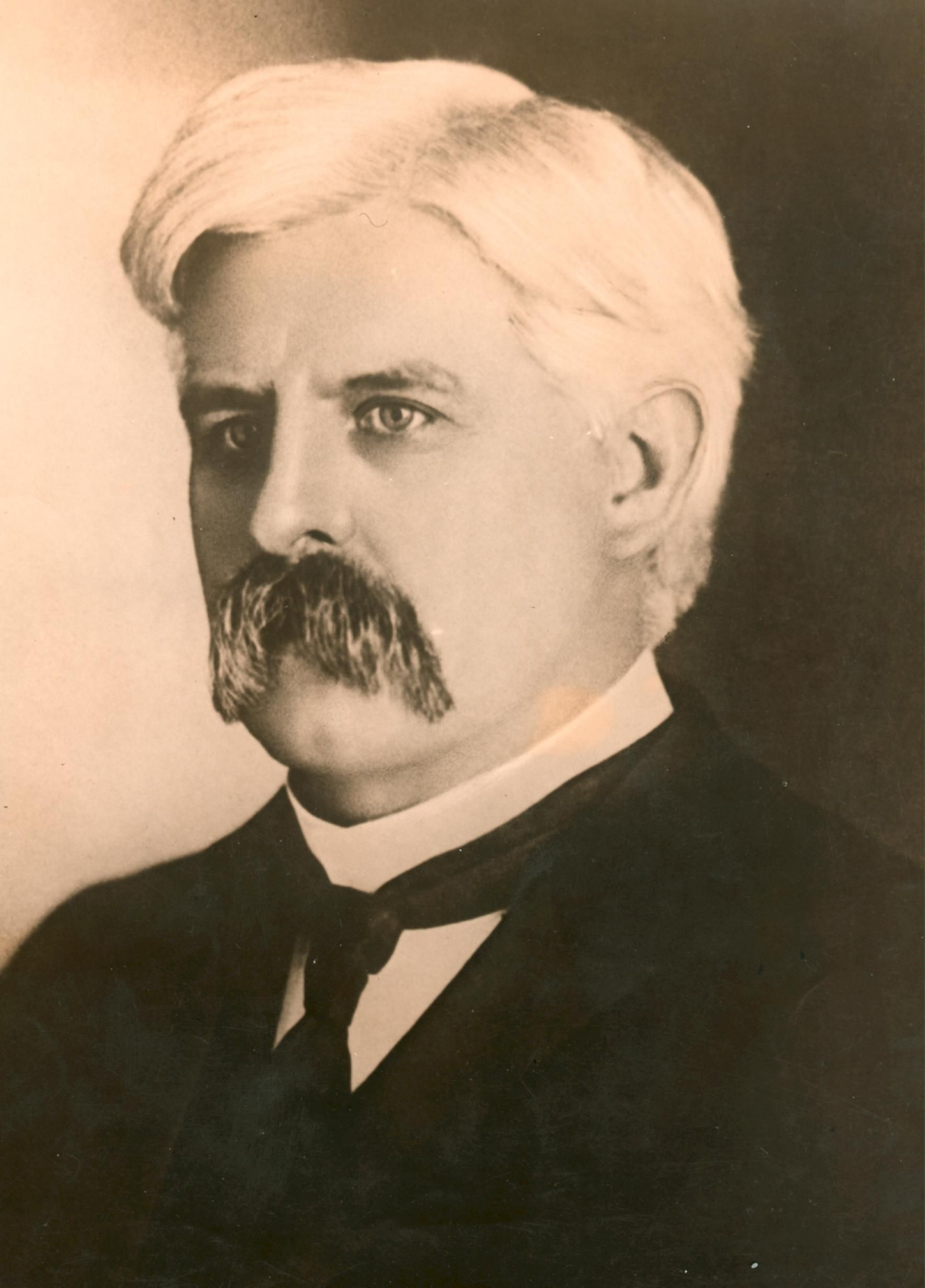
- Born: 9 April 1855; Prahran, Vic, Australia
- Died: 29 October 1924 (aged 69); Randwick, NSW, Australia
- Resting place: South Head Cemetery
- Education: The Geelong College, University of Melbourne
- Occupation: Headmaster
- Employer: Presbyterian Ladies' College, Sydney
- Known for: Headmaster, Presbyterian elder
- Term: 1887–1919
- Successor: Dr E. Neil McQueen
- Spouse: Jane Armstrong (m. 1883–1924)
- Children: 4

John Marden (9 April 1855 – 29 October 1924) was an Australian headmaster, pioneer of women's education, and Presbyterian elder.

== Early life and training ==
Born in Prahran, a suburb of Melbourne, Victoria, Marden was the fifth child of English parents, John Marden, a butcher, and his wife Catherine, née Murphy. He was educated at The Geelong College and the University of Melbourne, where he graduated as a Master of Arts in Mathematics and Physics.

While completing his law degree, Marden married a schoolteacher, Jane Armstrong at Cape Clear, on 20 December 1883. He also returned to his old school, The Geelong College, this time as a teacher under notable educator George Morrison, moving to the Methodist Ladies' College, Melbourne (M.L.C Melbourne) as a Science master three years later.

== Career ==
In July 1887, the committee of the General Assembly of the Presbyterian Church of New South Wales advertised for an appropriate Principal for its new school, The Presbyterian Ladies' College in Sydney. Marden applied for the position and was unanimously selected "because of his high academic standing, his experience and success in teaching and his high Christian character." He opened the school with 39 students on 30 January 1888, at Fernlea, a fourteen-roomed gentleman's residence in Ashfield (the current site of the Sydney Private Hospital), with Miss M. McCormick as lady superintendent. Together with the Committee set up by the Presbyterian Church in N.S.W for establishing P.L.C, he was responsible for organising the curriculum and hiring the appropriate staff.

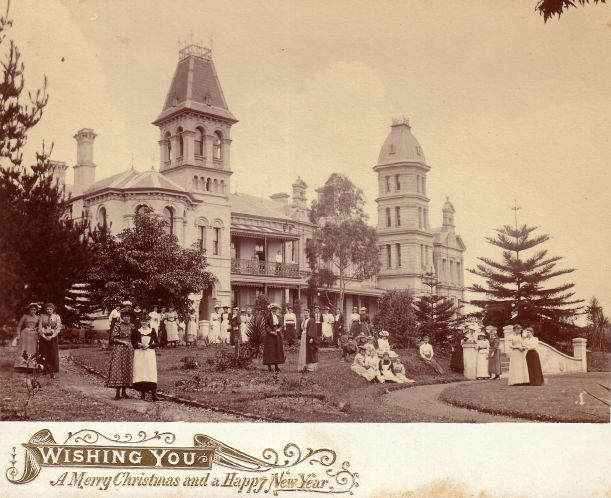
Shubra Hall and PLC students, 1892

In 1890, after his examination in jurisprudence, the University of Sydney conferred on him the degree of LL.D. That year the College had outgrown the Ashfield site, and so the Presbyterian Church in New South Wales purchased Shubra Hall, the home of Anthony Hordern, at Croydon. Marden worked closely with Albert Bond, the architect of the new school, and was responsible for most of the ideas for the new buildings, based on what he had seen at M.L.C Melbourne. Keenly interested in horticulture, he also laid out impressive gardens and playing fields.

In 1916, due to the overwhelming popularity of the Presbyterian Ladies' College, and under Marden's guidance, the school bought 50 acres (20 ha) at Pymble for £15,000, and established a second campus, The Presbyterian Ladies' College, Pymble (now Pymble Ladies' College). Both campuses were administered by a single council until 1929. Marden was Headmaster of the two schools until ill health forced his resignation in 1919.

Marden administered both of his schools with firm discipline, kindness, understanding and generosity, and winning the respect and affection of his pupils, strongly influenced them. He was a strong believer in equal opportunity in education, and has been described as an "early feminist" and "truly a man before his time." He scorned the idea that P.L.C Croydon was some kind of finishing school for daughters of the wealthy, and was quoted as saying:

I am ... out of sympathy with the cry that education is unnecessary for girls, and that all they require is a few accomplishments. Women have also to live their life – in most cases a harder one than men have. This notion of accomplishments being sufficient for girls is surely a remnant of those barbarous days when women were looked on as the plaything of men.

He believed that women should share in opportunities for secondary and tertiary education, and also hold high Christian ideals. Although trained as a lawyer, he gave physics, chemistry and biology a prominent place at a time when few schools included much science in the curriculum. He also instituted a house system in both schools. In his later years he was assisted by a prominent educational innovator, Dr E. Neil McQueen, a scientist and an ardent advocate of the Dalton plan for education, who later succeeded him at the Croydon College.

== Retirement and death ==
Upon his retirement in 1919, Marden purchased a residence at Wentworth Falls where he spent his leisure time and holidays, and exercised his horticultural skills. It was here that he also he became friendly with Peter Board, then director of education.

Marden was active in the Presbyterian Church, serving as an elder at Ashfield for 28 years, and for his last six years at Wentworth Falls. He died at Randwick on 29 October 1924 at 69 years of age, and was buried in South Head Cemetery. His wife, son and three daughters survived him.

== Legacy ==
The Marden Memorial Library at the Presbyterian Ladies' College, Sydney, Marden Boarding House at Pymble Ladies' College and Marden house are named after him.

== See also ==
- List of Australian Presbyterians
