= Andrew Harper =

Scottish–Australian biblical scholar, teacher and college principal

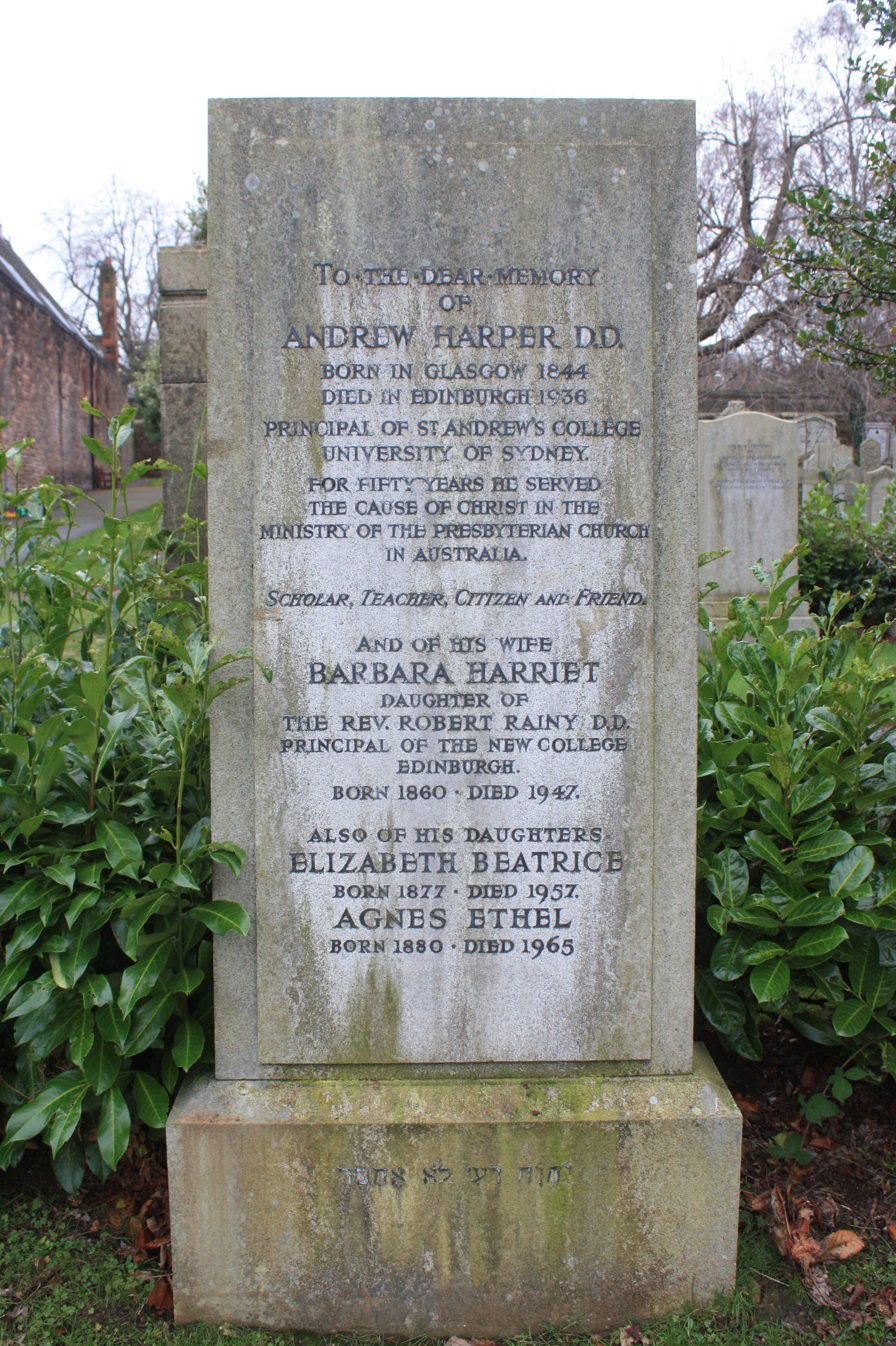
- The grave of Andrew Harper, Dean Cemetery
- Born: 13 November 1844; The Gorbals, Glasgow, Scotland
- Died: 25 November 1936 (aged 92); Edinburgh, Scotland
- Resting place: Dean Cemetery
- Education: Scotch College, Melbourne
- Alma mater: University of Melbourne; University of Edinburgh
- Occupations: Biblical scholar, teacher, and school and university college principal
- Employers: Presbyterian Ladies' College, Melbourne; Ormond College; St Andrew's College
- Spouses: Agnes Marion Craig (m. 1875; died 1885): Barbara Harriet Rainy
- Children: 7 (2 m., 5 fem.)
- Relatives: Robert Harper (brother)

Andrew Harper (13 November 1844 – 25 November 1936) was a Scottish–Australian biblical scholar, teacher, and school and university college principal.

== Early life ==
Harper was born at 167 Main Street, in the Gorbals in Glasgow, Scotland, son of Robert Harper, a grocer, and his wife Elizabeth, née Calderwood. His older brother Robert Harper was a businessman and member of parliament. After some preliminary education at The Glasgow Academy, he moved to Australia and enrolled at the Scotch College, Melbourne.

Harper joined the civil service, and in 1864 passed the matriculation examination of the University of Melbourne and graduated BA in 1868. Harper then studied at the University of Edinburgh, where he graduated BD in 1872 and gained the Cunningham fellowship.

== Career ==
On Harper's return to Australia from Edinburgh, he was assistant at Chalmers' Church, East Melbourne from September 1873 – 1875. He did not pursue the ministry at this point as his doctrinal views were liberal evangelical and were not openly accepted at that time. He was appointed English master at the Presbyterian Ladies' College, Melbourne, in 1875, becoming headmaster in 1877, and in 1879, principal. Harper resigned at the end of 1888.

Also in 1888, Harper was appointed lecturer of Hebrew and Old Testament Exegesis at Ormond College within the University of Melbourne. He was ordained and appointed Professor in 1893. He was editor of The Messenger of the Presbyterian Church of Victoria in 1895–1902. In 1902 he took up the appointment as Hunter-Baillie professor of Hebrew and Principal of St Andrew's College at the University of Sydney, and was Chairman of the Presbyterian Ladies' College, Sydney Council from 1907 until 1913.

== Retirement and death ==
He is buried in the 20th century extension to Dean Cemetery accessed off Queensferry Road in western Edinburgh. His wife Barbara lies with him along with two daughters: Elizabeth Beatrice Harper (1877–1957) and Agnes Ethel Harper (1880–1965).

== Family ==
Harper married twice: firstly to Agnes Marion Craig (died 1885) on 23 October 1875 and secondly to Barbara Harriet Rainy (1860–1947), daughter of Dr Robert Rainy, Principal of New College, Edinburgh. His and Barbara's daughter Margaret Hilda Harper became a noted physician.

== Legacy ==
Portraits of Harper are held at the Presbyterian Ladies' College, Melbourne and the Presbyterian Ladies' College, Sydney. His contribution to Presbyterian Ladies' College Sydney is also recognised in the schools house system, with Harper House. St Andrew's College at the University of Sydney features the Harper building named in his honour.

== See also ==
- List of Australian Presbyterians
- Notable Aberdonians
