= Margaret Hilda Harper =

Australian paediatrician (1879 – 1964)

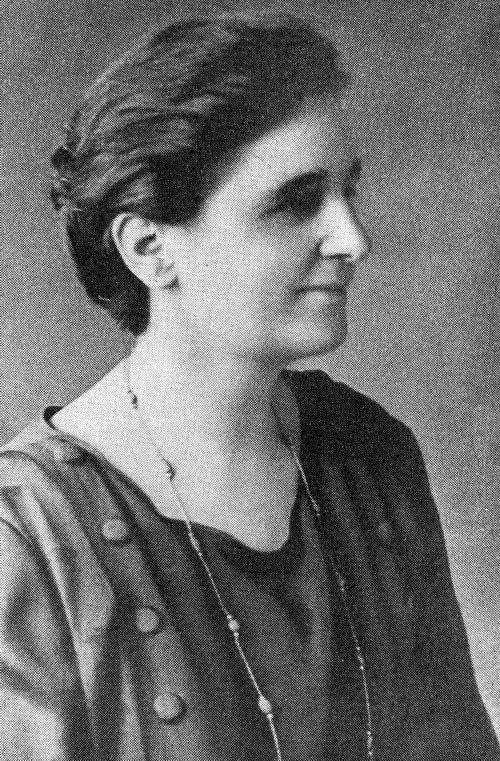
- Margaret Hilda Harper
- Born: 4 April 1879; Melbourne, Victoria, Australia
- Died: 2 January 1964 (aged 84); Chatswood Sydney, New South Wales, Australia
- Education: MB ChM, University of Sydney
- Occupations: Pediatrician, Medical Writer, Radio Commentator
- Parents: Andrew Harper (father); Agnes Marion Craig (mother)
- Relatives: Robert Rainy Harper (half-brother); Robert Harper (uncle)

Margaret Hilda Harper (4 April 1879 – 2 January 1964) was an Australian pediatrician, medical writer, and radio commentator. Harper was one of the two physicians who described that coeliac disease in the pancreas and cystic fibrosis were "distinct entities" in the 1930s.

== Early life and education ==
Margaret Hilda Harper was born in Melbourne, Victoria, in 1879, the daughter of Rev. Andrew Harper and Agnes Marion Craig. Her mother died in 1885 when Margaret was only six years old. Through most of her life, she was raised by her aunts and housekeepers until her father had another child, Robert Rainy Harper, with his second wife, whom he married in 1892. Her uncle was Robert Harper, a prominent Melbourne businessman and member of parliament.

Harper attended the Presbyterian Ladies' College, Melbourne, where her father was the principal. She then enrolled in the University of Melbourne where she began to study medicine in 1901. Harper was one of the recipients of the W. T. Mollison Scholarship, granted to matriculated students between the ages of seventeen and twenty one who are interested in studying foreign languages. She received the scholarship for studying Italian. Her father was then appointed to St. Andrew's College, a co-residential college within the University of Sydney. Margaret Harper transferred over to continue her study. She graduated in 1906 with two degrees, Bachelor of Medicine (M.B) and Master of Surgery (Ch.M).

== Career ==
Harper contributed in the medical field through many career positions in her life. After Harper graduated, she began her career as a resident medical officer at the Royal Hospital for Women in Paddington, New South Wales. She was also a medical officer at the first baby clinic that was built in the Royal Alexandra Hospital for Children, located in Camperdown, New South Wales. In 1922, Margaret became a cofounder and an Honorary Medical Officer at Rachel Forster Hospital for Women. In 1938, she was one of the four Founding Fellows for the Royal Australasian College of Physicians. In 1949, she was appointed as a member of the Child Welfare Advisory Council of New South Wales, improving the healthcare and safety of the children.

Harper also had an interest in diseases in children and their mothers. She wanted to find a better way for children to be fed, so she rejected Dr. Truby King's "Plunkett System." The "Plunkett System" was a very strict system for mothers to feed and care for their babies in a certain way. Dr. Truby King advised mothers to breastfeed their newborns every three to four hours a day, except at night. This system was to help the baby get used to a routine so that they were not spoiled by their parents. However, not every baby can be breastfed, so Harper experimented with infant diets and nutrition to find simpler formulas for newborn babies. Her research and experimentation led to her discovery of differentiating between coeliac disease and cystic fibrosis.

In 1926, Harper wrote The Parent's Book, which taught parents how to care for their children. The book eventually went to its twentieth edition. After her research in 1930, Harper lectured to medical students at a couple of universities about mothercraft and diseases in newborns. She presented a daily fifteen minute program called The Lady Doctor on ABC Radio.

Harper died 2 January 1964.

== Selected works ==
- 1926, The Parent's Book
