= Meg Wade =

Australian equestrian

Margaret "Meg" Wade (born 15 September 1961 in Sydney) is an Australian equestrian and endurance champion, the youngest daughter of electrical engineering manufacturer William Glenn Wade and nursing sister Betty Alice Mitchell. Her maternal grandfather, Walter Steadford Mitchell served in the 11th Light Horse regiment during World War I.

== Equestrian career ==
Meg Wade was the first person to win, four times, the Southern Hemisphere’s premier 100 mile (160 km) endurance race, the Tom Quilty Gold Gup. Meg Wade grew up on her parents farm at Wallacia, New South Wales and began riding at an early age, competing at local pony clubs and shows. She was educated at Presbyterian Ladies' College, Sydney, and at Hawkesbury Agricultural College and later qualified as a helicopter pilot. She began competing in endurance equestrian events in 1988 on ‘Quillionaire’ a thoroughbred she had bred and raised herself, but then began to ride Arabians. She subsequently completed in sixty-three one-day 160 km competitions and won twenty-four of them. Wade has been ‘Australian Endurance Rider of the Year’ ten times and has thrice won team bronze medals at World Championships and an individual 4th placing at the 2002 World Championships. On numerous occasions she has competed on behalf of Sheikh Mohammed bin Rashid Al Maktoum Prime Minister and Vice-President of the United Arab Emirates.

She and her husband, Chris Gates, raise Angus beef cattle on a property near Albury. She also established the Castlebar Arabian Stud with a foundation breeding stock of 20 competition horses.

Her brother-in-law is the Australian historian Edward Duyker.

== Riding Accident and Recovery ==
On Easter Sunday, 2009, while competing in a 100 kilometre ride at Tumbarumba she was thrown from her horse and was critically injured with a fractured skull. She was subsequently airlifted to Canberra Hospital in a coma. Although she eventually regained consciousness, she spent nine months in Epworth Hospital in Melbourne recovering from Acquired Brain Injury. Her medical expenses were paid by Sheikh Mohammed bin Rashid Al Maktoum. Wade’s courageous struggle to walk and ride again was chronicled by Pip Courtney in a Landline feature broadcast on ABC Television on 1 August 2010. The program also featured her first post-accident helicopter flight with the late Gary Ticehurst.
