= Presbyterian Ladies' College, Armidale =

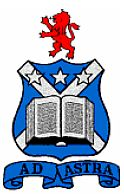

Location
- Armidale, New South Wales; Australia; 30°29′53″S 151°40′3″E

Information
- Type: Independent, single-sex, day and boarding
- Motto: Latin: Ad Astra (To The Stars)
- Denomination: Presbyterian
- Established: 1887
- Chairman: David Lim
- Principal: Nicola Taylor
- Employees: ~37
- Enrolment: ~400 (K–12)
- Colours: Green, blue and red
- Slogan: Educating successful women of tomorrow in a Christian environment
- Website: www.plcarmidale.nsw.edu.au
- Head of Senior School is Anna Caldwell

The Presbyterian Ladies' College, Armidale (PLC Armidale) is an independent, Presbyterian, day and boarding school for girls. The school is located in Armidale, a large rural town with a population of 24,000 in the New England region of New South Wales, Australia.

PLC Armidale currently caters for approximately 400 students from Kindergarten to Year 12, including 80 boarders in Years 5 to 12. Enrolment at PLC Armidale is non-selective, and students from all races and religious affiliations are welcome. The college is affiliated with the Association of independent schools of New South Wales (AIS NSW), the Junior School Heads Association of Australia (JSHAA) the Association of Heads of independent schools of Australia (AHISA), the Australian Boarding Schools' Association (ABSA), and is an affiliate member of the Association of Heads of Independent Girls' Schools (AHIGS).

In 2006, PLC was named the top performing Higher School Certificate school in the New England region of New South Wales. Overall PLC Armidale ranked 114th in the State.

== History ==
The Presbyterian Ladies' College dates from the foundation of the New England Ladies College at "Smith House" in 1887, offering a secondary education for girls under its Principal, Elizabeth Higgs. In 1910, the New England Ladies' College was bought by Alethea Tendall, who went on to be proprietor and Principal for 28 years, and who renamed it The Hilton School. When Tendall purchased it, the school was operating out of two houses. A group of Presbyterian businessmen purchased the school in 1938, and the following year it came under the financial support of the Trustees of the Presbyterian Church of Australia. Subsequently, the school's name was changed to its current form, The Presbyterian Ladies' College, Armidale. In 1945, 70 acres (28 ha) of land on North Hill were purchased, and following a fund raising campaign, the foundation stone of the new school buildings was laid in 1960. Since then, several building programmes have extended the facilities to their present form.

In late August 2005, due to financial troubles at the College, it was announced that PLC Armidale and the Presbyterian Ladies' College, Sydney (PLC Sydney), would join to form an alliance, with both schools coming under the executive leadership of William McKeith, the Principal of PLC Sydney. Members of the PLC Armidale Council formed part of the new joint school Council, essentially making the two PLC's true sister schools.

The aim of this alliance is to strengthen PLC Armidale through cooperative marketing, a change in management and a stronger financial base. It is also to be of benefit to both schools through student exchanges, accommodation for sporting events or excursions, and a 'country or city' option for prospective students. Both schools will maintain their separate identities in order to preserve the unique histories and traditions that both have developed over many years.

== Principals ==
Period	Details
1910–1938	Anthea Collis Tendall
1938–1941	Helen Isabella Wilkie, M.A., PhD (Edinburgh) Principal of PLC Sydney 1942–1945
1942–1951	Clarice Ashworth
1952–1953	Kathleen Buchan
1954–1958	E. Jean McColl
1959–1962	D Joan Humby
1963–1968	Catherine McLean
1969–1971	Acting Principal – Dorothy Knox
1971–1978	Faye Morris-Yates
1979–1989	Francis Parsons
1989–1997	Rosalyn Lindsay
1997–1999	Carole Tisdell
2000–2002	Ness Goodwin
2002	Acting Principal – Roderick West
2003–2005	Judith White
2005–2010	William T. McKeith AM, B.A., Dip. Ed. (Macquarie), M.A. (Sydney), M.B.A. (Leicester), Ed. D. (Leicester), F.A.C.E., F.A.I.M. Principal of PLC Sydney since 1986, Principal of both schools from 2005.
2011–2014	Paul Burgis, PhD (UNSW), MEd, Dip Tchg, Dip Div & Miss Principal of both PLC Armidale and PLC Sydney
2015–present	Nicola Taylor

== Co-curriculum ==
A variety of sports and co-curricular activities are offered each semester, and students may choose from these according to their interests and needs.

=== Music ===
The school offers a range of musical instruments and musicianship classes, including bagpipes, cello, clarinet, double bass, drums, electronic keyboard, flute, french horn, guitar, oboe, percussion, piano, piccolo, recorder, saxophone, singing, violin, viola, trombone, trumpet. Students may also be enrolled in Australian Music Examinations Board (AMEB) and Trinity College music examinations.

Students may also participate in ensemble music, with choirs, orchestra, bands, string, saxophone, recorder and flute ensembles available. During the school year there are a number opportunities for public performances.

=== Sport ===
PLC Armidale encourages students to participate in a range of team and individual sports, with teams for all ages and all levels of ability. The school enters teams in the Independent Girls' Schools Sporting Association (IGSSA) competitions and other competitions as appropriate. Sports available include: Tennis, Softball, Touch Football, Swimming, Athletics, Basketball, Hockey, Netball, Soccer, Equestrian, and Cattle Management.

== Notable alumni ==
- Kate Bell – Actress on Blue Water High
- Patricia Lovell – Producer of Gallipoli

== Associated schools ==
Neighbouring Schools

Nearby schools include:

- The Armidale School
- New England Girls' School
- O'Connor Catholic College
- Armidale Secondary College

Presbyterian Schools

There are three other Presbyterian schools in New South Wales:

- PLC's 'sister school', The Presbyterian Ladies' College, Sydney. Sydney and Armidale "PLC's" are both overseen by Paul Burgis (Executive principal of Armidale, Principal of Sydney), and a joint College Council.
- The Scots College, Bellevue Hill
- The Scots School, Bathurst

== See also ==
- List of non-government schools in New South Wales
- List of boarding schools in Australia
