= Ewen Neil McQueen =

Australian headmaster and psychologist (1889–1967)

Dr. Ewen Neil McQueen
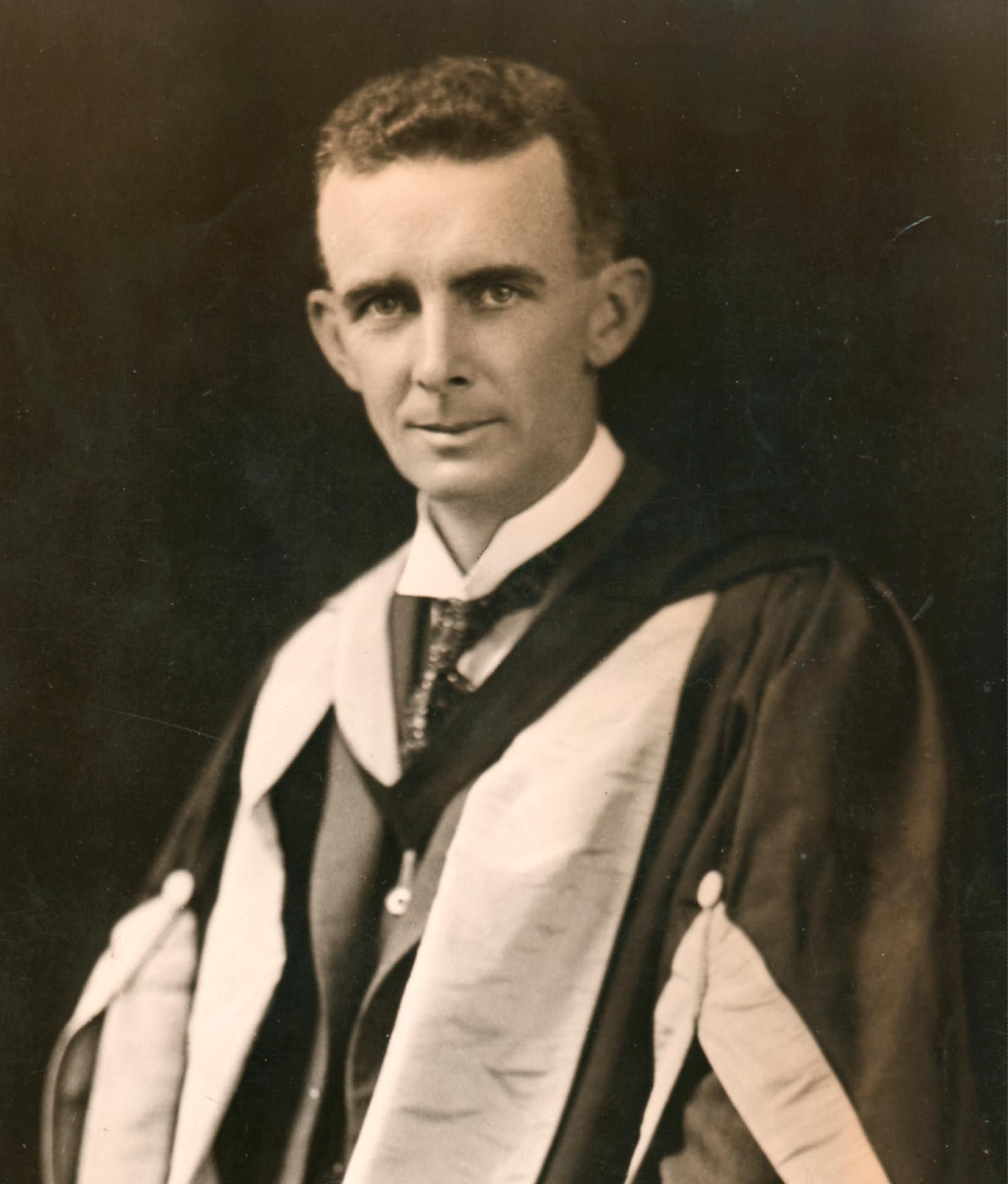
- Born: April 1889; Carlton North, Victoria, Australia
- Died: 1967
- Other name: Neil McQueen
- Education: Scotch College, Melbourne; Melbourne University
- Occupation: Headmaster
- Employer: Presbyterian Ladies' College, Sydney
- Known for: Headmaster, scientist, psychologist, general practitioner
- Term: 1920–1929
- Predecessor: Dr. John Marden
- Successor: Miss Anna Drennan
- Spouse: Florence Isabel Dunn (m. 1913–1967)
- Children: 4

Ewen Neil McQueen (April 1889 – 1967) was an Australian headmaster, prominent educational innovator, scientist, psychologist and General Practitioner. He was most often known as Neil McQueen or E. Neil McQueen.

== Early life and training ==
Born at Carlton North, Victoria, McQueen was the fourth son of Rev. Finlay McQueen, a minister at Skipton, near Ballarat, and his wife Emma Selina Bruton. McQueen's parents had earlier emigrated from the Scottish Highlands.

McQueen was educated at his local primary school, performing so well that he received an open scholarship to the Scotch College, Melbourne. At Scotch, McQueen proved himself as a scholar, becoming dux in classics in 1906 and winning a scholarship to Ormond College at Melbourne University in classics and mathematics. He was also a talented tennis player and track and field athlete.

McQueen had originally wanted to study medicine at university, but was persuaded by his father to take up arts. He was awarded a number of exhibitions and graduated first place in his final honours exam. In 1910 he won the Wyselaskie Scholarship, which enabled him to take his M.A. degree.

On 13 April 1913 he married Florence Isabel Dunn of Northcote, with whom he had four children, Ewen Garth (born 1916), Patricia^{[d]} (born 1925), Sheila and Barry (born 1931).

After graduating from university, McQueen went to the University of London where he studied both general and experimental psychology, taking out a first class honours degree in science. He continued his research in psychology at the Psychological Laboratory of University College London, specialising in testing and measurement, where he was supervised by Professor Charles Spearman, one of the early psychometricians. McQueen focused his work on the "Distribution of Attention" in individuals, rejecting earlier claims that there were certain individuals types who possessed general powers of an extensive attention span capable of taking on a number of tasks at the same time. The result of this study was published in the British Journal of Psychology as a monograph supplement in 1917. The time spent in London was important for McQueen as it allowed him to come into contact with the latest British educational thinking. It was at this time that were sown the seeds of his later "radical" approach to education.

== Career ==
On his arrival back in Melbourne, McQueen intended on enlisting but was asked to assist at a state school in Gippsland. Three months later, in 1916, he returned to teach in Melbourne, and shortly after was appointed Vice-principal of two Sydney 'sister' schools: the Presbyterian Ladies' College, Croydon^{[a]} and the Presbyterian Ladies' College, Pymble.^{[b]}

In 1920, the principal of these two schools, Dr. John Marden resigned due to ill health, and McQueen was subsequently made Principal of the Presbyterian Ladies' College, Croydon (P.L.C).^{[c]} It was here that McQueen gained his reputation as a "radical" and innovative educator.

During McQueen's first three years at P.L.C, he made only minor changes to existing policies and routines, preferring to do as Marden had before him. It is said that at this time he may have even been more conservative than Marden, for example, in 1921, he recommended to College Council that no Roman Catholic should be appointed to the staff, whereas Marden had appointed Roman Catholics. McQueen did however campaign for playing fields and a swimming pool at the school, believing that sport should play an important role in the education of young ladies, a somewhat unorthodox idea at the time. His other change in these early years was to allow the pupils a greater say in the election of the School Captain and Prefects.

By 1922, McQueen seemed to be established as the principal, and the school was prospering with its highest enrolments ever seen, and he obviously thought it time to introduce changes in line with his own philosophy. The first tangible product of this philosophy was the institution of the school's own Intermediate Leaving Certificate which more accurately represented what his school stood for. He did not think that the State's Intermediate Certificate did so, concentrating as it did on exams only. As McQueen said:

The object of awarding the Certificate is to give a sort of hallmark of the school to those who are of a high grade of intelligence with backbone and grit and character. Those who hold the certificate we know will always be able to fill usefully their place in the community.

The school's certificate was awarded not purely on exam results but on the record of a girl throughout her whole course. It was only awarded after a girl had reached the required standard in scholarship, sport and school life. The girls had to demonstrate "on the playing fields and in the school life that they possess those qualities of womanhood for which the school stands," These certificates were sought after and prized by the girls of the college.

McQueen's next change occurred in that same year, when Lindley Evans was appointed as music teacher. McQueen believed that the teachers appointed to his school should not only have great ability in their chosen field, but also have imagination and be prepared to be innovators. McQueen saw this in Evans and felt that he could lift the standard of music at the school. This did indeed happen. For many years, P.L.C won the coveted 'Dempster Shield' for choral singing. The school won it so many times in fact, that the shield became the permanent property of the school.

In 1923 McQueen became more innovative still. He reorganised the school along the lines of the Dalton Plan, an educational concept created by Helen Parkhurst. This scheme originated in Massachusetts, and was based on the importance of experience and of allowing the pupil to be "free to continue his work upon any subject in which he is absorbed." It also encouraged the "interaction of group life." McQueen's arrangement was a modified version of the original Dalton Plan. At least one formal class lesson was given in each subject each week. During the rest of the week, about half the periods, students spent their time in practical work, reading texts and other references under the direction of a teacher who was available for individual and/or group consultation. All work was divided into monthly portions and set out in "Monthly Assignments". Charts in each subject room indicated pupils' progress in that subject and pupils kept their own progress charts as well. Girls who fell behind were required to make up their work on Thursday and Friday afternoons. The reaction of the girls was, on the whole, favourable with the senior girls "almost unanimously" in favour of it. Younger girls however found it harder to adapt as they "had got into the habit of depending on teachers for everything". Two surveys of the scheme among the girls and staff twelve months apart indicated that most were in favour, especially as time went on.

The Dalton Plan was McQueen's major reform and by it he attempted to transform the whole school. He was however also greatly influenced by at least two other teaching procedures. The first of these was the project methods which was based on the ideas of W. H. Kilpatrick who in turn was influenced by John Dewey. The project method set out to "allow children to follow their own ways in purpose, planning and execution and judgement." Many other schools at the time were also introducing similar methods based on Kilpatrick's work. The other influence on McQueen was "The Play Way" of H. Caldwell Cook which stressed the importance of "original thought and fancy" in children's activities. The outcome of these two philosophies on the school was the use of drama (often in the form of pageant's) to aid self-expression and the introduction of lectures and self-government.

In 1926 McQueen introduced some peer assessment, whereby girls' estimates of each other's work and worth was taken into consideration in the allocation of prizes. As McQueen said:

To my mind the impression made by a girl on her schoolmates is very important, as affording an index of the future value of that girl as a citizen of the world. The school should be, as much as possible, a microcosm of the world.

McQueen also introduced a house system, school camps to Mittagong, and a course in infant care that same year.

== Resignation ==
A number of school pageants and open days to show the Dalton Plan at work enabled McQueen to give practical demonstration of his theories. Overall, they were enthusiastically received. However, the conservative P.L.C Council remained unimpressed.

In August 1923, the Chairman of Council, Rev. John Ferguson, retired due to ill health. Up until this stage it appeared that Council was quite happy with McQueen's new ideas and organisation, however, as soon as Ferguson had retired, relations began to deteriorate between McQueen and Council.

On 15 November 1923, the new Chairman of Council, Mr R. W. Gillespie, chaired his first council at Croydon. At this meeting the matter of the college's own Intermediate Certificate was raised. It was moved that:

It be an instruction to the Principal at Croydon to resume the former practice of preparing and presenting the students for the D.P.I (Department of Public Instruction) or University public examinations, and that he announce this in a speech at breaking-up on 10 December.

This motion was later withdrawn due to McQueen's powers of persuasion. However, McQueen's problems were not over. Council moved to reduce his authority by insisting that he produce a Principal's report for each Council meeting. This also highlighted Gillespie's lack of confidence in him as this had never before been the practice at Croydon, nor was it the case at Gillespie's other school, Knox Grammar School. This clash of personalities continued for another six years with the authority of the Principal being eaten away year by year.

Despite this tension, McQueen remained undaunted. He continued to advocate and suggest ideas and plans which he wanted implemented for the good of the school and the girls.

In 1926 P.L.C Croydon began to show a financial loss and enrolments began to fall. Council's concern at the "deteriorating" situation was manifest by further attacks on McQueen over the manner in which he was managing the school. As the situation worsened, so did Council's relations with McQueen. As a result, a committee was formed to investigate the management of the school.

In May 1929, McQueen was given leave to travel overseas and present his paper in person about his work at P.L.C. The leave was to be for two terms. In his absence, the committee investigation laid all the school's problems at McQueen's feet. It recommended sweeping changes to the curriculum, the abandoning of the Dalton Plan, because of the unhelpful effects on discipline, and finally:

that a change in Principalship is necessary in the best interests of the College. The committee is satisfied that the Principal has the welfare of the College at heart and is enthusiastic and of very high ideals but because of the very high losses over a number of years and showing little improvement in the number of pupils the committee is of the opinion that a lady is better suited as a principal of a Ladies' College and the positioning to which the College has come cannot be overcome by the present management at the College.

McQueen was informed of this decision and cut his leave short, returning from overseas. At a meeting on 11 December 1929, Council unanimously resolved that Dr McQueen's appointment be terminated. Rev. A. M. Ogilvie, Minister at Beecroft, apologised for his absence and by letter indicated that he opposed the motion. He was McQueen's sole supporter. Subsequently, Messrs R. Vicars and F. Thompson interviewed McQueen to "invite his resignation". McQueen, gentleman to the end, advised Council to take any action that it deemed necessary. McQueen's "resignation" agreement was that he would be paid £1,209 in lieu of notice and that his two daughters would be accepted at the college at the pleasure of Council, as day scholars free of ordinary school fees. When news of McQueen's "resignation" became known, a number of parents were said to be outraged by the council's action and withdrew their daughters immediately, thereby, incidentally, worsening the enrolment situation. A number of staff resigned in protest, Lindley Evans among them.

The P.L.C. Speech Day of 1929 clearly illustrated the degree of support for McQueen among parents and students. It is said that when the official party came on stage, there was no applause until McQueen appeared. Vicars, the chairman for the occasion, referred to McQueen once towards the end of the ceremony but was drowned out by cheering and clapping "during which Council were a peculiar greenish hue about the face, especially Gillespie and Vicars." Further, after the national anthem was sung and the officials were about to leave the stage, Rev. William Duffy, Minister at Wollongong and a parent of a P.L.C student, stood up and asked the chairman to be seated. He said that McQueen had been wronged and what was more, he was not even allowed to say good-bye. Council subsequently rushed out quickly and locked themselves in the dining room. In the Assembly Hall all was confusion with everyone cheering, stamping their feet and shouting. The stamping continued for so long that the Hall became full of dust, making it hard to see. Eventually, Mr. Duffy was able to quieten the gathering and McQueen was able to speak. He thanked those who had helped him and added:

that as the Council's only aim in education was to make money and as he had not made money for them they were quite right in dismissing him.

Parent and ex-student protest meetings followed, and the matter was taken up in the press, however all efforts failed. McQueen is often remembered by ex-students as a great man who made learning interesting and relevant.

== Later years ==
After leaving P.L.C., McQueen returned to his first love, medicine, at the University of Sydney. After graduating, he practised successfully as a general practitioner in the Ashfield district of Sydney for many years.

McQueen died in 1967. He was survived by his wife and four children.

== Legacy ==
The "E. Neil McQueen Block" and the "McQueen Seminar Room" at the Presbyterian Ladies' College, Sydney are named after him.

== Notes ==
- Established 1888; Now called the Presbyterian Ladies' College, Sydney
- Established 1916; Now called Pymble Ladies' College
- Miss G. Gordon Everett was made Principal of the Presbyterian Ladies' College, Pymble.
- Was to become Lady Patricia Mason, wife of NSW Chief Justice Sir Anthony Mason

== See also ==
- GTXC
