= Dorsch's White Cross Bakery =

- U.S. National Register of Historic Places
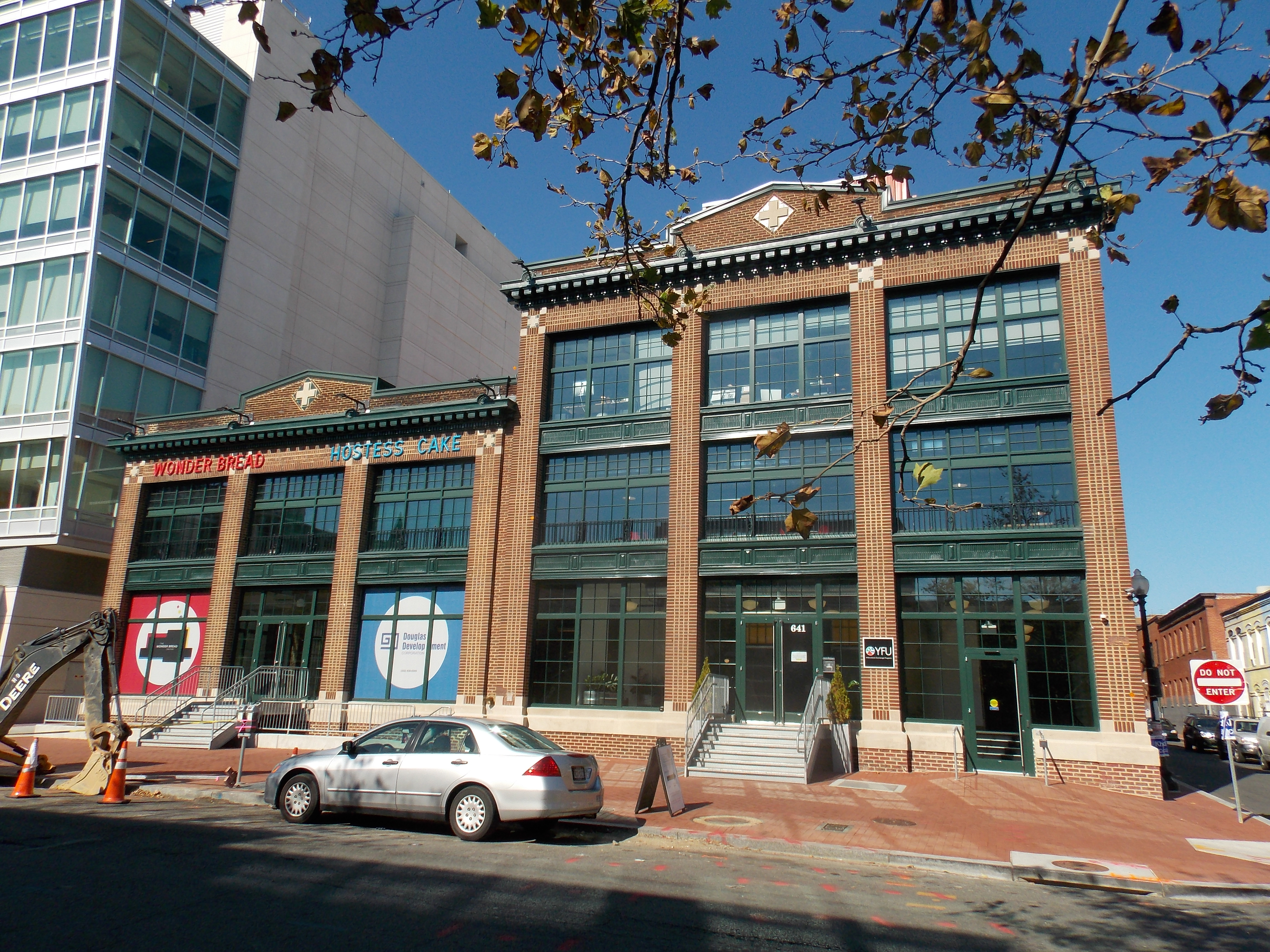
- October, 2014

- Location within Washington, D.C.
- Location: 641 S St., NW; Washington, D.C.
- Coordinates: 38°54′52″N 77°01′16″W
- Built: 1913, 1936
- NRHP reference No.: 11001076
- Added to NRHP: February 3, 2012

Dorsch's White Cross Bakery, also known as the Wonder Bread Factory, is a complex of historic structures located in the Shaw neighborhood of Washington, D.C. It was entered in the District of Columbia Inventory of Historic Sites in 2011 and listed on the National Register of Historic Places in 2012.

== History ==
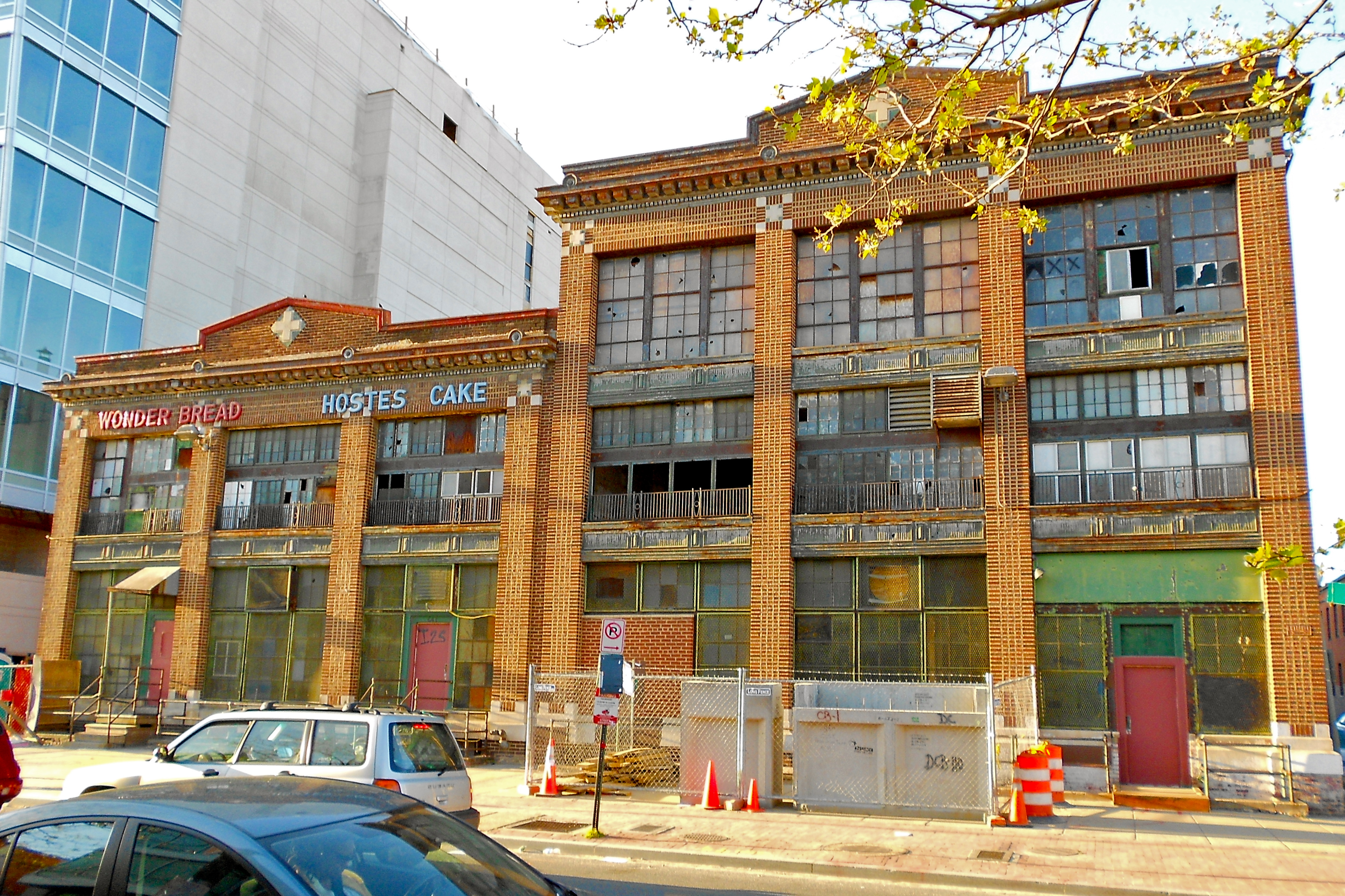
Building prior to renovation in 2012

Peter Michael Dorsch (1878-1959), who was a Washington, DC native, established the business in 1904 on Seventh Street and moved to the present location in 1913. The buildings that front S Street, NW were built in 1915 and 1922. They were designed by different architects, but they are composed of similar materials, treatment and details. They features elements of the American Craftsman style. White terra cotta tile crosses in the center pediments identify the building with White Cross Bakery. The building has been redeveloped into a mix of office and retail uses.

On the 2018 reboot of Murphy Brown, the building served as the Cable News Channel studios from which the title character's show Murphy in the Morning was broadcast.
