= Robert Steel (minister) =

Robert Steel (15 May 1827 – 9 October 1893) was a Presbyterian minister in colonial Australia.

Steel was of Scotch extraction, but was born at Pontypool, Monmouthshire, Wales, the son of James Steel and Anne Gillespie his wife. He was educated at the Ayr Academy and at the Aberdeen and Edinburgh Universities, being licensed to preach by the Free Presbytery of Irvine in 1851. He subsequently held various charges, being transferred to Halford in 1855 and to Cheltenham in 1859. He meanwhile contributed to the religious press, and was the originator and for four years one of the editors, of Meliora, a quarterly periodical of social science. In 1861 he was created Ph.D. of the University of Göttingen.

In 1861 Steel was appointed to the pastorate of the Macquarie Street church, Sydney, where he arrived in June 1862. Subsequently, he took a leading part in promoting the union of the Presbyterian churches of New South Wales, and was elected Moderator of the third General Assembly in 1867. He was actively interested in the establishment of St Andrew's College, University of Sydney, and he has been one of the General Assembly's tutors in theology. For five years he edited the Presbyterian, a weekly paper in Sydney. In 1869 he was adjudged guilty of contempt of court for having published a letter from a missionary exposing the evils of the Polynesian labour traffic, and which it turned out had reference to the proceedings of a captain who was awaiting trial for the murder of kidnapped South Sea Islanders. The Chief Justice, Sir Alfred Stephen, dissented from the decision, and Steel was the object of much popular sympathy, evidenced by addresses and presentations.

Along with William Ridley, Steel was granted government aid for the Maloga mission. Steel was created D.D. by Lafayette College in Pennsylvania, and in 1874 was transferred to the pastorate of St. Stephen's Church, Phillip Street, Sydney. In the same year Steel visited the New Hebrides, in the Dayspring, in order to see the working of the missions, in which he had always taken a deep interest, and published a book on the subject in 1880. Amongst other works, Steel is author of the following: Doing Good, or the Christian in Walks of Usefulness (1858); Samuel the Prophet, and the Lessons of his Life and Times (1860); Lives made Sublime by Faith and Work (1861); Burning and Shining Lights, or Memoirs of Good Ministers of Jesus Christ (1864); The Christian Teacher in Sunday Schools (1867); The Shorter Catechism with Analyses, Illustrations, and Anecdotes (1885); and The Achievements of Youth (1891). All the above were published by Messrs. Nelson & Sons, of Edinburgh.

Steel married at Huntly, Scotland, on 23 November 1853, Miss Mary Allardyce; he died at North Sydney on 9 October 1893 and was buried in the Presbyterian section of Rookwood Cemetery, survived by three married daughters and three sons.
