= Arthur Aspinall =

Australian minister and school principal in Sydney

The Reverend Arthur "Ashworth" Aspinall (23 June 1846, Southeram, England – 9 June 1929, Turramurra, Australia) was a co-founder and the first Principal of The Scots College, Bellevue Hill, Sydney, Australia. He was a Congregational and Presbyterian minister, and a joint founder of the Historical Society of New South Wales. A portrait of Arthur Aspinall is found in Cameron's Centenary History, p. 320, Plate 99.

== Educational qualifications ==
Arthur's initial occupation is unknown. He was trained by private tutors, particularly Primitive Methodist minister Miles Moss, and Barzillai Quaife who, like Arthur and his family, was a close friend of the Reverend John Dunmore Lang. It is also known that serious illness (possibly typhoid (or scarlet fever: ADB)) interrupted his studies. Camden College rejected Arthur's initial application to train as a minister because he was softly-spoken, a difficulty he overcame with training. Eventually Arthur trained at the University of Sydney and at Camden Theological College (1868–1871), to become a Minister of Religion in the Congregational Church. He earned a B.A. with distinction. Before he had completed his training, Arthur decided to move to the Presbyterian Church. This change of allegiance was undoubtedly influenced, even encouraged, by John Dunmore Lang. This change also meant that Arthur was required to repay his tuition fees for his earlier training by the Congregational Church. He was ordained and inducted at Forbes (which had just become a new parish) in 1873. Just before his retirement from the position of Principal of the Scots College, Sydney, Arthur obtained a master's degree in history from the University of Sydney.

== Early ministry ==
As a student, Aspinall preached to the Congregational gathering in Marrickvile at the home of Thomas Holt MLC (1871–1872). When their church was built (now the Roseby Memorial Church) Arthur, though still a student, was appointed as the first minister. He did not complete his training when he decided to switch his allegiance to the Presbyterian Church.

Aspinall's first appointment to a Presbyterian ministry in 1874 was based at Forbes. His parish covered a vast area between the Lachlan and Bogan Rivers. At least twice a year Aspinall would make a month-long journey on horseback to visit the many squatters in the district. During these visits services were held, children were baptised, couples were married and prayers were finally said for the dead who had been buried since his last visit. He left this parish in 1887 to return to Sydney.

== The Scots College ==
The well-educated minister saw a need to provide an education in Sydney for the children of these pastoralists at a price which they could afford. Arthur returned to a ministry in Sydney in 1887 and took up an appointment at the St Lukes, Redfern church (1887–1893). Initially the family lived near the church. From 1890 to 1892 they lived in a large house on a large block of land that they had purchased at Unwin's Bridge Road Marrickville (now Tempe). It is thought that the original intention was to start the school in this building. Then Thomas Saywell offered the Church the use of the de-licensed Brighton-le-Sands hotel for the proposed boarding school. Necessary changes were made to the hotel by Arthur's brother, Albert Aspinall, a builder. When The Scots College was officially opened on 28 January 1893 with the sons of his friends from the Forbes circuit as boarders Arthur's dream had been fulfilled. Much of the money to establish the school had come from his wife's family. They and another family then purchased the house in Tempe from the Rev. Aspinall. Arthur remained as the Principal of the school until he retired in 1913. Ashworth, as Arthur preferred to be called, was a tough, unpopular disciplinarian. Small transgressions by his children and students resulted in harsh punishments. (This aspect of Ashworth's personality is expanded elsewhere: see references.) Behind his back, even after retirement, Ashworth, was called "The Old Tosh" by friends and family as well as by his students. As a tribute to Arthur, one of Scots's boarding houses (Aspinall) is named after him.

== Background and family ==
Arthur was born in Southowram, West Riding of Yorkshire, England and died in Turramurra, a suburb of Sydney, NSW, Australia. His ashes are interred in the family grave at the South Head Cemetery, Waverley. His family left Southowram in 1851 and settled in Aston-under-Lynne, Lancashire (about 20 km east of Manchester). He came to Australia in 1857 with his parents, John Aspinall and Sarah (née Ingham) and siblings (including Albert), aboard the Mary Ann. The Mary Ann left Southampton, England on 27 November 1856 and arrived in Sydney, Australia on 19 March 1857 [SMH]. The family lived at 9 Arundel Terrace, Parramatta Road, Bishopthorpe, opposite Sydney University. In 1877 he married Helen Strahorn (daughter of pastoralist John Strahorn of Wandoo Wandong station, Obley, NSW). They had seven children the first two of whom, possibly twins, were never registered and died very young. The other five children became doctors, with his daughter Jessie Aspinall becoming the first female junior medical resident at the Royal Prince Alfred Hospital.

After his retirement Arthur and his family still living at home moved to St Killians, 6 Challis Avenue, Potts Point (named after the original building of The Scots College in Bellevue Hill). His wife died during a trip to England in 1915. About 1919 Arthur moved to Eastwood for a short period, leaving his daughter, Jessie, and family to continue to live in the house for many years. In the early 1920s Arthur bought a house and 5 acres (20,000 m^{2}) of land at Trentino Avenue, Turramurra, a property which remained in the family for many years. Arthur named the property "Morita" after his Japanese live-in servant. Eventually Arthur developed senility from which he died. In his confused state of mind he destroyed many of his personal papers and documents of archival value to both the Church and to the Historical Society of New South Wales of which he was a founding member.

When Arthur entered Camden College he was a member of the congregation of the Pitt Street Congregational Church, Sydney.
