= Susan Dorsch =

Australian physician and educator

- Born: 25 March 1935 (age 91); Sydney, New South Wales, Australia

Academic background
- Education: University of Sydney
- Thesis: The cellular mechanisms in alloimmune responses in vivo (1974)

Susan Evelyn Dorsch (born 25 March 1935) is an Australian physician and educator. She became the first female appointed to Professorship in the Faculty of Medicine at the University of Sydney. She is Emeritus Professor at the University of Sydney.

== Life and career ==
Susan Dorsch was born on 25 March 1935 in Sydney, New South Wales, Australia. In 1958, she graduated from medicine at the University of Sydney. In 1958–1959, Dorsch was a Resident Medical Officer at the Royal Prince Alfred Hospital in Sydney. Between 1959 and 1969, Dorsch worked as General Practitioner at Harden, New South Wales. In 1970, she was appointed Teaching Fellow in the University of Sydney's Department of Pathology. The same year Dorsch started her postgraduate research study at the University of Sydney that continued until 1974. In 1974 she worked as a Senior Research Officer for the National Health and Medical Research Council (NHMRC) in the Department of Pathology becoming Senior Lecturer in 1975, Associate Professor in 1981 and Professor in 1983.

Dorsch was the first female appointed to Professorship in the Faculty of Medicine at the University of Sydney. Between 1978 and 1987 Dorsch supervised Bachelor and PhD students in the Faculty of Medicine as well as Master and PhD students in the Faculty of Science.

From 1983 to 1986, she was a member of the Rhodes Scholarship Selection Committee, from 1984 to 1987 – a member of the Harkness Fellowship Selection Committee.

In 1985, Dorsch chaired the committee on the Centenary of the First Women Graduates. In 1986 she was appointed Pro-Vice-Chancellor of the University of Sydney and in 1989 Deputy Vice-Chancellor, remaining on the position until 1995. Between 1989 and 1996, Dorsch was a Director of the Northern Area Health Service Board. From 1991 to 1993 Dorsch was a Member of the National Health and Medical Research Council (NHMRC). In 1991–1994, she was also a Chairman of the Australian American Education Foundation.

Since 1995, Dorsch is Emeritus Professor of the Faculty of Medicine at the University of Sydney. In 1996, she received the honorary degree of Doctor of the University of Sydney.
