= Peter Michael Blayney =

Australian artist (1920–2014)

- Born: October 26, 1920; Wellington, New Zealand
- Died: April 9, 2014 (aged 93); Sydney, Australia
- Education: National Art School

Peter Michael Blayney (26 October 1920 – 9 April 2014) was an Australian artist.

== Early life ==
Blayney was born on 26 October 1920 in Wellington, New Zealand. He moved to Australia at the age of nine, and would later study at the National Art School in Sydney.

== Career ==
Blayney's work focused on contemporary portrayals of Greek and Roman mythology, and he had numerous solo exhibitions of his artworks. The first of these came in London in 1962, five years before he would return to Sydney. He has also taught art in numerous art schools in London and in Sydney.

Art critic Elwyn Lynn described Blayney as "the overlooked artist".

== Death ==
Blayney died in Sydney on 9 April 2014. In his death notice, Blayney was described as a "fine artist, educator and intellectual".
