= Presbyterian Ladies' College, Sydney =

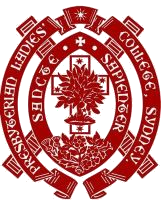

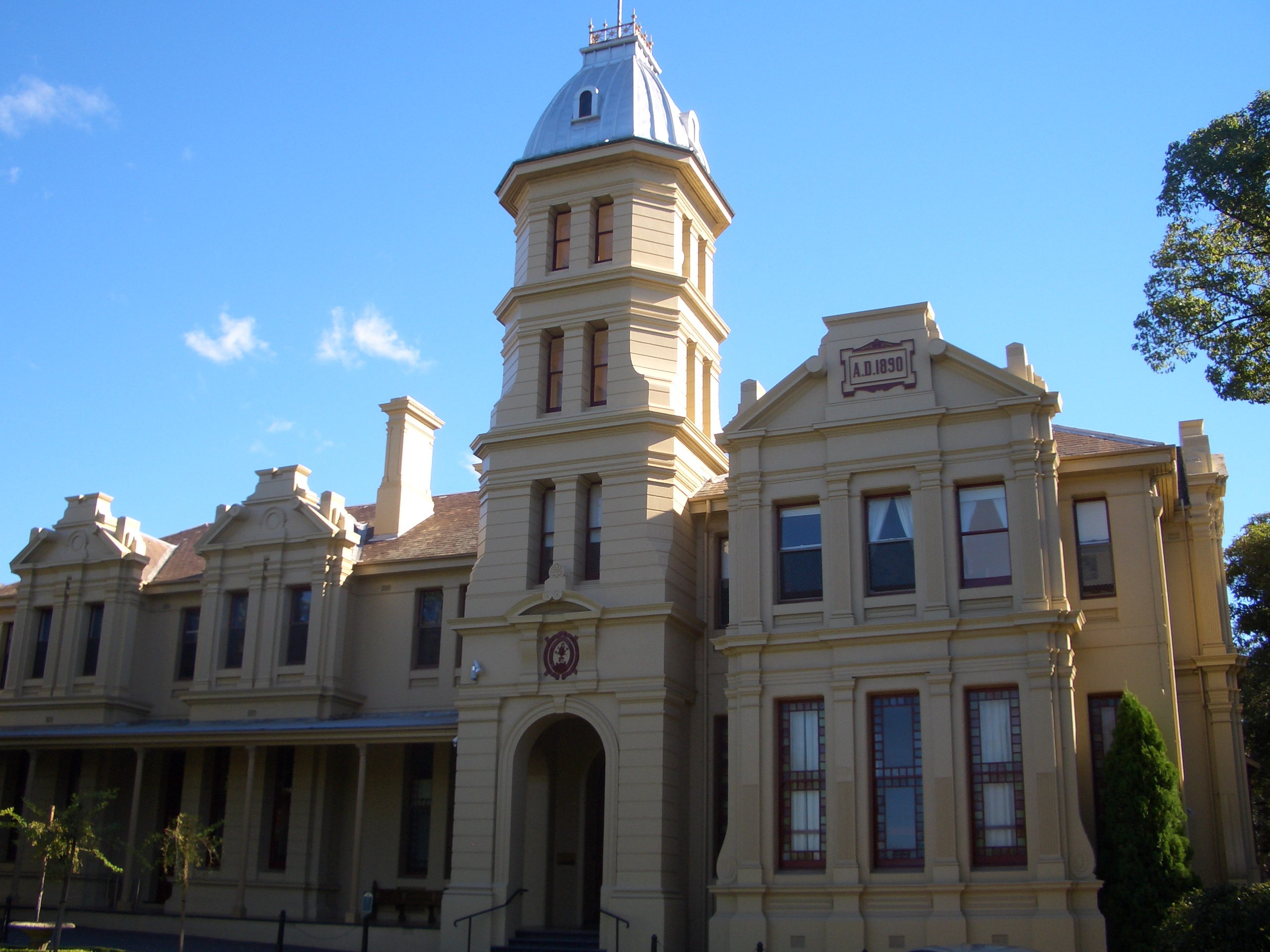
- Shubra Hall at Croydon, PLC main school, built 1890

Location
- Croydon, Sydney, New South Wales; Australia; 33°52′54″S 151°6′57″E

Information
- Type: Independent day and boarding school
- Motto: Latin: Sancte Sapienter (Be holy wisely)
- Denomination: Presbyterianism
- Established: 1888; 138 years ago
- Educational authority: New South Wales Department of Education
- Oversight: Presbyterian Church of Australia
- Chairman: David Lim
- Principal: Dr Paul Burgis
- Chaplain: Edwina Soh
- Teaching staff: 158.6 FTE (2025)
- Employees: 284 FTE (2025)
- Years: Early learning and K–12
- Gender: Girls
- Enrolment: 1495 (2025)
- Colours: Black, red and white
- Slogan: Young Women of Integrity and Purpose
- Affiliations: Association of Heads of Independent Girls' Schools; Association of Heads of Independent Schools of Australia; Junior School Heads Association of Australia; Australian Boarding Schools' Association; Round Square
- Website: www.plc.nsw.edu.au

The Presbyterian Ladies' College, Sydney (PLC Sydney) is an independent early learning, primary and secondary school for girls, located in Croydon, an Inner West suburb of Sydney, New South Wales, Australia. The school has a non-selective enrolment policy, and caters for approximately 1,500 girls from age 4 to 18, including day students and 65 boarders. Established in 1888 by the General Assembly of the Presbyterian Church of NSW, PLC Sydney is the oldest continuously running Presbyterian Church school in its state.

PLC Sydney offers the option of Cambridge Assessment International Education (CAIE) in Years 9 and 10 to supplement learning, in addition to the NSW Education Standards Authority courses (the HSC), as it enables students to sit examinations in globally recognised courses. From 2025, Cambridge A-Levels was offered as an alternative to the HSC in Years 11 and 12. Students attend PLC Sydney from all regions of the greater metropolitan area, New South Wales, and overseas. The college is a founding member of the Association of Heads of Independent Girls' Schools and is affiliated with the Association of Heads of Independent Schools of Australia, the Junior School Heads Association of Australia, and the Australian Boarding Schools' Association. PLC Sydney is one of two Sydney schools in the Round Square organisation. Notable alumnae include the first qualified female architect in Australia and other pioneering women in education, law, and medicine.

== History ==
=== Foundation ===
In 1883 the General Assembly of the Presbyterian Church of NSW formed a special committee to investigate a proposal to establish boarding schools for girls and for boys, to provide Presbyterian alternatives to the proliferating number of Roman Catholic secondary schools in the colony. The Minister at Richmond, Rev James Cameron stated: "Presbyterians should take prompt action because the Popish party, seeing the want that was felt throughout the colony in regard to higher education, has stepped in to supply that want, and if Protestants did not look to the matter, the Roman Catholics would take advantage of them." The General Assembly was also inspired to establish a school, particularly a Ladies' College, by less worthy motives. Other Protestant denominations in NSW had recently established their own Ladies' Colleges, and the neighbouring colony of Victoria had maintained a Presbyterian Ladies' College since 1875, and so it was felt that NSW Presbyterians should also have one. At the 1884 Assembly the Committee announced that while a boys' school was not needed, the secondary education options available to girls were not satisfactory, and they recommended that a Ladies' College, similar to the Presbyterian Ladies' College, Melbourne, be established as soon as possible.

A Ladies' College Committee was formed and by July 1887 they had leased a property in Ashfield. For principal, they unanimously selected Dr. John Marden, a science master from the Methodist Ladies' College (MLC) in Melbourne, "because of his high academic standing, his experience and success in teaching and his high Christian character". Marden was a strong believer in equal opportunity in education, and has been described as an "early feminist". He rejected the idea that PLC was to be merely a finishing school for the daughters of the wealthy, and was once quoted as saying:

I am ... out of sympathy with the cry that education is unnecessary for girls, and that all they require is a few accomplishments. Women have also to live their life - in most cases a harder one than men have. This notion of accomplishments being sufficient for girls is surely a remnant of those barbarous days when women were looked on as the plaything of men.

The Presbyterian Ladies' College was finally opened by Marden and lady superintendent, M. McCormick, on 30 January 1888, with 39 girls. It was modelled on the great English Public Schools, and was the first school to be established by the Presbyterian Church of New South Wales. Together with the Committee, Marden was responsible for organising the curriculum and hiring the appropriate staff. During the opening ceremony the Governor invited his wife, the Countess of Jersey, Margaret Child-Villiers, to speak. She made what the Sydney Morning Herald described as a "capital impromptu speech". The Countess' speech was widely reported throughout Australia and elsewhere around the world, as at the time it was quite unusual for a woman to speak in public. PLC's Jersey Day, an annual event in which ex-students return to the College on the Sunday closest to 10 March, is named in honour of the Countess.

=== Growth ===
In the early years at Croydon, girls tended to be enrolled at an older age, typically over fourteen. It was apparent that despite Marden's insistence, many parents viewed the college as a finishing school. As today, it was not a requirement for students to be Presbyterians, and early school records indicate there were a number of Roman Catholic and Jewish students. By 1900, the reputation of the school had spread, and pupils were starting to come from a wider geographic area, including New Caledonia, Fiji, New Zealand, the Northern Territory, Western Australia, Queensland and South Australia.

The increase in enrolments also convinced the Council of the need to set up a branch school on another site, preferably on the North Shore. In 1913, Marden reported that many applications were being refused because of "shortness of space." The Assembly approved the establishment of a branch at Pymble and gave the Council of PLC Croydon £5,000 to erect new buildings and lay out the grounds. The Presbyterian Ladies' College, Pymble was opened on 8 February 1916 with 48 day girls and 86 boarders. Marden became the principal of both schools. The opening of the Pymble campus necessitated a change of name for the Croydon College, from The Presbyterian Ladies' College, Sydney to The Presbyterian Ladies' College, Croydon.

Marden retired at the end of 1919 and a principal was appointed to each branch. Dr E. Neil McQueen, a prominent educational innovator who had previously been the Vice-Principal of the two schools, became the second Principal of PLC Croydon.

In 1918, the school magazine Aurora Australis was first published. On the cover, it bore a quotation from Thomas Carlyle: '. . . here hath been dawning another blue day. Think wilt thou let it slip useless away.'

=== Second World War ===
In 1941, both the Principal Mary Hamilton, and the Senior Mistress (novelist, critic and historian) Flora Eldershaw, left the school to fill wartime positions in the bureaucracy. In 1942, the new principal, Dr Helen Wilkie, arrived to find falling enrolments, staffing problems and food shortages due to the effects of the Second World War. Word was soon received that Australian military authorities wished to inspect the school with a view to taking it over. On 24 March 1942, it was requested that PLC be occupied by the Royal Australian Air Force (RAAF) for the purpose of establishing a top secret Radar Unit and military barracks known as No.1 RIMU (Radio Installation and Maintenance Unit). In order to accommodate PLC's students and classes, the Council approached Meriden School in Strathfield. Meriden agreed to house the boarders and the singing, domestic science, and physical education classes. PLC also purchased Lingwood, a property in Strathfield, as a centre for the school's remaining activities.

At the end of 1942, the Meriden authorities indicated that they could no longer house the PLC boarders, so Lauriston, Strathfield, on The Boulevarde, and Welbeck, at 18 Margaret Street, were rented for them. In July 1944 the Council agreed to purchase Lingwood, at 16 Margaret Street, to house a Kindergarten feeder school for the college, or as a site for a permanent move. A few months later the Council decided that the future of PLC lay in Strathfield. The Croydon campus was offered to the military for £36,500 and plans were made to purchase Welbeck and Lauriston to form the new PLC.

The Council's preference for Strathfield as a permanent location for the school was not shared by most of the school community, and after an intervention by the Education Trust of the NSW General Assembly it was decided that PLC would reopen once again at Croydon in first term 1946. The military agreed to pay for the extensive renovations that were required, with the final cheque handed over by the government on 21 March 1949. Lauriston and Welbeck were disposed of in 1946, but the Lingwood property was retained as a preparatory school. The Council negotiated with Margaret Thompson, the owner and principal of Branxton, a private school in Strathfield, about moving her school to the Lingwood property, where it would retain the name Branxton and come under the control of the PLC Council.^{[b]}

Evidence of PLC's wartime occupation remain, with tunnels and bomb shelters accessible from below the stage of College Hall. A plaque presented to the school by the RAAF, in commemoration of PLC's wartime involvement, can be found on the school verandah at the entrance to the Main School.

=== Postwar ===
Freda Whitlam, sister of Prime Minister Gough Whitlam was principal between 1958 and 1976. It was a period of great social transition. In 1968 Miss Whitlam wrote: 'Ours is a world where each year we become more conscious of how quickly and radically our environment is changing. Technology is taking the drudgery out of our lives and opening up exciting opportunities for those who have a good general education and are willing to think positively and creatively. Here we help the girls with this aim in view.' In 1970, after Bill McLeod spoke to some of the seniors and advised those intending to become a nurse or a teacher to learn Greek or Italian (to aid communication with immigrants), Miss Whitlam took up the suggestion: 'We have people with time to do something after the exams at the end of each year – let's organise Greek classes for them'. In March 1972 the school also produced a newsletter ΕΛΛΗΝΙΚΑ ΝΕΑ providing background on Greek culture and language and a bibliography of relevant books in the school library.

In 1977, a Union of the Congregational, Methodist and Presbyterian Churches took place, forming the Uniting Church in Australia. Approximately one third of the Presbyterian Church decided to remain Presbyterian, and consequently the property of the Church had to be divided. In May of that year it was announced that PLC Croydon was to remain Presbyterian and PLC Pymble would be transferred, with its name changed to Pymble Ladies' College. Then in 1978 it was decided that PLC Croydon should return to its original name: The Presbyterian Ladies' College, Sydney. Freda Whitlam took part in the movement to form the Uniting Church and thus ended her principalship of the school. She was moderator of the New South Wales Synod of the Uniting Church in Australia (1985–1986).

In late August 2005, due to financial troubles at the Presbyterian Ladies' College, Armidale, it was announced that PLC Armidale and PLC Sydney would join to form an alliance, with both schools coming under the executive leadership of Dr William McKeith, the Principal of PLC Sydney. Members of the PLC Armidale Council formed part of the new joint school Council, essentially making the two PLC's true sister schools.

The aim of this alliance is to strengthen PLC Armidale through cooperative marketing, a change in management, and a stronger financial base. It is also meant to benefit both schools by providing student exchanges, accommodations for sporting events or excursions, and an additional "country or city" option to prospective students. Both schools will maintain their separate identities in order to preserve the unique histories and traditions that both have developed over many years. PLC celebrated their 120th anniversary in 2008 and to mark the occasion the college commissioned a limited edition commemorative coffee table book, PLC Sydney 1888–2008: A Photographic Essay.

== Principals ==
The following individuals have served as Principal of PLC Sydney:

Ordinal	Headmaster	Qualifications	Other key positions held	Term start	Term end	Time in office	Notes
1	Dr John Marden	BA, LLD (Melbourne)	Principal of both Croydon and Pymble Colleges from 1916	1887	1919	31–32 years	
2	Dr Ewen Neil McQueen	MA (Melbourne), DSc (London)	Vice-Principal of both Colleges until 1920	1920	1929	8–9 years	
3	Anna Drennan	MA (Edinburgh)	Acting Principal at Pymble 1928	1929	1931	1–2 years	Acting Principal
4	Mary Hamilton	BA, DipEd (Melbourne)		1933	1941	7–8 years	
5	Dr Helen Isabella Wilkie	MA, PhD (Edinburgh)	Principal of PLC Armidale 1938–1941	1942	1945	2–3 years	
6	Eunice Macindoe	BSc (Sydney)		1946	1956	9–10 years	Alumnae of PLC Sydney (Class of 1921)
7	Jean Tassie	BA		1957	1957	0 years	Acting Principal
8	Freda L. Whitlam	BA, Dip Ed (Melbourne) MA (Yale)		1958	1976	17–18 years	
9	Norma Brown	BA, DipEd		1977	1977	0 years	Acting Principal
10	Patricia Dyson	MA, DipEd (Sydney)		1978	1985	6–7 years	
11	Dr William T. McKeith AM	BA, Dip Ed (Macquarie), MA (Sydney), MBA (Leicester), EdD (Leicester), FACE, FAIM	Principal of both PLC Armidale and PLC Sydney from 2005	1986	2010	23–24 years	
12	Dr Paul Burgis	PhD (UNSW), MEd, DipTchg, DipDiv	Executive Principal of both PLC Armidale and PLC Sydney	2011	incumbent	14–15 years	

== Campus ==
The Presbyterian Ladies' College, Sydney, initially opened on 30 January 1888, at Fernlea, a 14-room gentleman's residence set on 1.21 hectares (3 acres) in Ashfield. But by August they had already outgrown this location, so they purchased Shubra Hall, the home of department store owner Anthony Hordern III at Croydon, for £7,500. Plans were drawn up for the additional buildings required, and Marden worked closely with the architect, Albert Bond. Marden was responsible for most of the ideas for the new buildings, based on those he had seen at MLC Melbourne. Keenly interested in horticulture, he also laid out gardens and playing fields. By the beginning of the 1891 school year, the new site was complete and ready for furnishing as the permanent home of PLC.

The Presbyterian reported the opening of the College on 10 March 1891, by the Governor of NSW, the Rt Hon Victor Albert George, 7th Earl of Jersey at its new site:

Standing in 2.43 hectares (6 acres) of ground, laid out in lawn tennis courts, gardens, etc., in an elevated position, it forms, with its tower 84 ft (26 m) [26 m] high, a very conspicuous feature in the landscape. The central feature of the building is the tower, and the architectural design of the facade is classic. Altogether the effect is very imposing ... The main staircase window is a work of art well worth seeing. The central window is beautifully designed, and contains two female figures representing Literature and Music.

By 1902 PLC was running out of space again and Marden urged that new classrooms be built. The Council reluctantly agreed and an extension was made to the Main School, with six classrooms downstairs and 18 rooms upstairs. The addition was completed on 6 October 1904, at a cost of £2,000.

On 24 March 1942, it was requested that PLC be occupied by the Royal Australian Air Force (RAAF) for the purpose of establishing a top secret Radar Unit and military barracks known as No.1 RIMU (Radio Installation and Maintenance Unit). PLC's displaced boarders, and some of the classrooms, found a temporary home at Meriden School in Strathfield. The school purchased Lingwood, also in Strathfield, as a centre for the school's remaining activities.

At the end of 1942, the Meriden authorities indicated that they could no longer house the PLC boarders, so Lauriston (now the primary school of Santa Sabina College) and Welbeck, on The Boulevarde at Strathfield, were rented for them. The PLC Council nearly kept the school at Strathfield permanently, but ultimately it was decided that PLC would reopen once again at Croydon in first term 1946. The military agreed to pay for the extensive renovations that were required, Lauriston and Welbeck were disposed of in 1946, and the Lingwood property was retained as a preparatory school. Evidence of PLC's wartime occupation remain, with tunnels and bomb shelters accessible from below the stage of College Hall. A plaque presented to the school by the RAAF, in commemoration of PLC's wartime involvement, can be found on the school verandah at the entrance to the Main School.

The Presbyterian Ladies' College, Sydney still sits on a 5 hectares (12 acres) campus, now adjacent to Croydon Railway Station and within 15 minutes of the Sydney central business district, Sydney University, and the University of Technology. Having grown significantly since its foundation, particularly since the 1980s, the school today features a mix of 19th-century and modern buildings, historic landscaped gardens and playing fields.

== Curriculum ==
The Presbyterian Ladies' College is a comprehensive school with a traditional academic approach designed to prepare students for attending a university. The school is registered and accredited with the New South Wales Education Standards Authority, and therefore follows the mandated curriculum for all years.

=== Primary ===
Students in stages 1 to 3 (Kindergarten to Year 6) study the six Key Learning Areas: English, Mathematics, History/Geography, Science and Technology, Creative Arts, Personal Development, Health and Physical Education (PD/H/PE). The youngest students also follow the Reggio Emilia approach to education. Specialist extension courses are offered to select students from Year 2 to 6 with gifts and talents in special areas (SPEC).

=== Secondary ===
Subjects offered to stage 4 students (Years 7 and 8) include: English, Mathematics, Science, Geography, History, French, Mandarin, Latin, Japanese, Italian, Design and Technology, Visual Arts, Music, PDHPE, Computing and Religious Education. The "Excelsior class" is an enrichment programme offered to gifted students in this stage and includes additional classes such as Philosophy and Olympiad activities.

In stage 5 (Years 9 and 10), students are prepared for the School Certificate and study a programme that comprises two elective classes and Religious Education, as well as the courses mandated by the Board of Studies. The compulsory core subjects are: English, Mathematics, Science, Australian History and Geography, and PDHPE. Electives are chosen from: Elective History, Elective Geography, French, Mandarin, Latin, Japanese, Italian, Commerce, Drama, Design and Technology, Textiles and Design, Music, Visual Arts, and Physical Activity and Sports Science. In Year 10, the Excelsior class begins its study of the 1–Unit Higher School Certificate (HSC) course in Studies of Religion.

In the final school stage (Years 11 and 12) students are prepared for the New South Wales HSC. The curriculum at this stage has a clear university orientation. The Board of Studies requires stage 6 students to study a minimum of 12 units in the Preliminary Year and 10 units in their HSC Year (most subjects being worth 2 units). HSC English is compulsory; Standard and Advanced Extension courses, as well as 2-unit English as a Second Language are also offered. Students may then choose from all levels of Mathematics, Senior Science, Biology, Chemistry, Physics, Modern History, Ancient History, Business Studies, Economics, Geography, Legal studies, French, German, Latin, Japanese, Italian, Indonesian (Beginners), Mandarin, Design and Technology, Textiles and Design, Food Technology, Visual Arts, Music (Course 1 and 2), Drama and PDHPE.

University entry levels are high following the completion of stage 6. Each year approximately 50% of graduating PLC students receive a Universities Admission Index (UAI) higher than 90. In the 2006 Higher School Certificate, a PLC student received a perfect UAI score of 100, and in 2007 The Daily Telegraph named PLC the best-performing independent school in Sydney's inner–west.

=== Special education ===
PLC also offers a unique special education unit catering to students with mild to moderate intellectual disabilities. The transition programme was developed in 1992 in response to a decision by academic staff to provide a special-needs stream. Through this unit, up to 20 girls between the ages of 11 and 18 are provided with an individual curriculum incorporating mainstream classes where possible.

Senior students focus on the NESA Life Skills programme. Girls spend time as residential students in the on-campus Transition House, learning to manage their lives independently. Transition students also run an outdoor café to gain small business skills.

== Co-curriculum ==
=== Sport ===
PLC Sydney is arguably one of Australia's best girls' sporting schools. The college has been a member of the Independent Girls' Schools Sporting Association (IGSSA) since its foundation in 1922, and through this association senior students compete against 27 other girls' schools in graded weekend sports and carnivals. Sports available to students through IGSSA include swimming, diving, rowing, cross country, athletics, gymnastics, softball, tennis, basketball, soccer, Field hockey, netball, cricket and water polo. The college also offers sports such as skiing, snowboarding, equestrian and badminton through other competitions. In 2007 PLC won three IGSSA carnival premierships: in diving (for the ninth consecutive year), swimming, and gymnastics.

Primary school girls have the opportunity to participate in interschool sports through PLC's membership in the New South Wales branch of the Junior School Heads Association of Australia (JSHAA). Students with special sporting talent are provided a pathway to compete at the highest level available at PLC, IGSSA/JSHAA, Combined Independent Schools, state representation at School Sport Australia, and Commonwealth and Olympic level.

In September 2007, the college broke the under-19 female Australian record for 24-hour non-stop rowing, with a distance of 337 kilometres (209 mi). Also in 2007, PLC was named the New South Wales School Snowsports Club of the Year by the NSW Snowsports Association, later winning the national award at the 2007 Ski and Snowboard Australia Awards.

The 2008 rowing season has been one of the school's best to date. In March, the PLC 1st Eight crew won the Schoolgirl Eight race at the IGSSA regatta for the first time in the school's history. This crew was also successful at the 2008 Australian Rowing Championships, winning the A Final of the Schoolgirls Eight race (the Sydney Cup), ahead of St Catherine's School, Toorak and Pymble Ladies' College, thus ranking them as the best schoolgirl eight in Australia.

=== Ensembles ===
Junior and Senior School students can participate in musical ensembles, both selective and non-selective, including several bands, string orchestras, a full school orchestra, chamber music ensembles, choral groups and several smaller instrumental and vocal groups.

=== Debating and public speaking ===
PLC Sydney has a history of achievement in debating and public speaking. The college has competed in the Independent Schools Debating Association (ISDA) for the past five years and has had a long-standing commitment to the Archdale Debating Competition. PLC students have had success at the semi-final level, and they won the competition in 2006 and 2017.

PLC Sydney enters teams in the Junior and Senior sections of the Association of Heads of Independent Girls' Schools (AHIGS) Festival of Speech, producing the best results of any AHIGS school over the history of the competition, with 10 consecutive wins in the competition's 12-year history.

Students may also participate in the Macquarie Cup and the Commonwealth Bank Senior Debating, vying with students from a range of public, Catholic and independent schools. There are also Social Debates with surrounding schools as well as a regular competition with Trinity Grammar School called the PLC/Trinity Challenge.

=== Aid projects ===
The PLC Overseas Aid Fund has been established to enhance the college's work with aid projects in developing countries, and is an important part of the school's Round Square membership. Current projects undertaken by the school include the establishment and on-going management of two Kindergartens in East Timor, the management and support of Birla Children's Orphanage in Vietnam, and the establishment of the "Adopt a School" programme. This programme was developed and is directed by the principal, Dr McKeith, and matches schools in Australia with schools in Sri Lanka requiring rebuilding following the 2004 Tsunami. PLC's school, allocated through this programme, is the Senehasa Counselling, Training and Rehabilitation Centre for Girls.

== Motto and crest ==
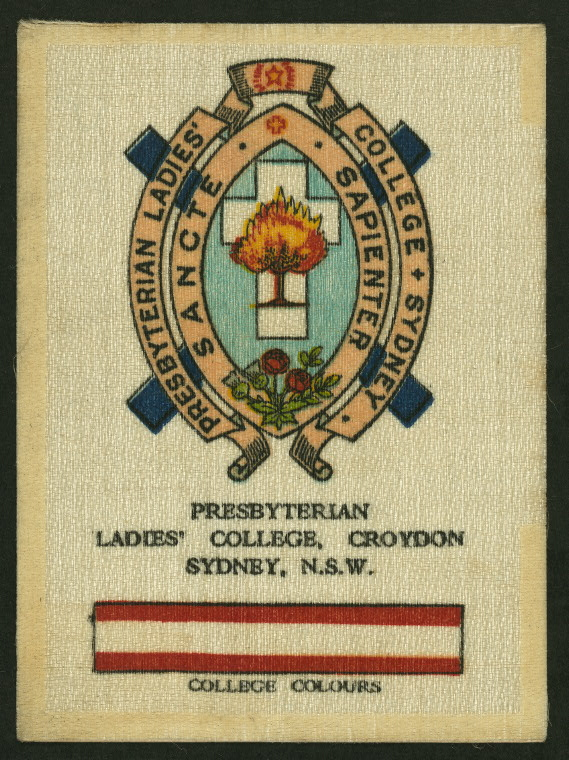
Collectable cigarette card featuring the PLC colours and crest, 'c. 1910s

The school crest was adopted at a College Council meeting on 23 August 1888. The College Council decided to use the same crest as that used by the Presbyterian Church of New South Wales, with minor modifications.

The Church's crest consisted of a shield with the words Nec Tamen Consumebatur (translated from Latin as "And yet it was not consumed") surrounding it. On the shield were the stars of the Southern Cross, a burning bush, and a Latin cross in outline. At the base were the floral emblems of Scotland, England and Ireland. Surrounding the shield was a border with the words "Presbyterian Church of New South Wales", with a Star of David placed on top. Behind both shield and borders was the cross of St. Andrew in blue.

The school modified this crest by changing the words "Presbyterian Church of New South Wales" to "Presbyterian Ladies' College, Sydney", placing a Maltese cross at the top of the shield and inserting the School motto Sancte Sapienter. The motto had been adopted by the school on 23 August 1888, and although no translation was given of the Latin, it may be loosely translated to "be holy wisely" or "holy, wisely."

== School badge ==
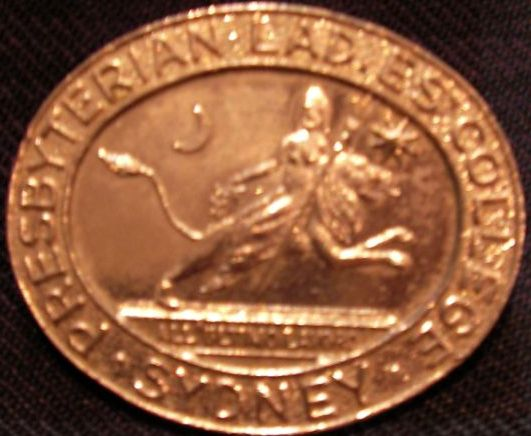
PLC Sydney school badge

The school's symbolic badge was inspired by the first principal, Dr. Marden, and designed in 1888 by the first art teacher, J.A. Bennett. The maiden on the lion represents Knowledge, which is crowned by a tower representing the home, and holding a trident representing Sovereignty. A laurel wreath represents the victory of true womanhood, while the sun symbolises light and energy, and the crescent moon stands for youth. The words "Presbyterian Ladies' College, Sydney" surround the badge.

The motto All'ultimo lavoro is Italian and comes from Dante's Commedia (Paradiso I, 13). It has variously been translated as "for the crowning task", "strive for the highest", "the utmost for the highest", or "I work for the highest", with the first of these being the most direct translation.

The badge is reproduced in the leadlight over the front door of Shubra Hall, and may also be found on the recently opened Ex-Students' pathway. It was traditionally worn as part of the uniform on the Tam o' Shanter, until it was phased out in 1995. The badge is currently not worn on the academic uniform, partially due to its adoption by Pymble Ladies' College as their school crest in 1977. It was, however, reintroduced in 2003 as an addition to the Beret of the PLC Pipes and Drums uniform, and is also used by the college's Ex-students' Union, as it has been since 1905, with the addition of the words "Ex-students' Union" below.

== Uniform ==
When the college first opened in 1888 there was no uniform, instead the girls wore long cotton dresses, gloves and hat. A straw boater was introduced in the early 20th century, worn with a red and white hat band featuring the college crest with its burning bush woven into it in red. During this time Prefects wore red silk arm-bands embroidered with a gold crest.

The distinctive Black Watch Tartan of the college was introduced in 1908. Senior girls wore heavy box-pleated skirts and white blouses; junior girls wore pinafore dresses. All girls wore a navy blazer and heavy woollen stockings. Prefects also wore a special hat badge with a ring of bright blue enamel. A black felt Breton was introduced for winter use, and no change was made until the introduction of the green beret in 1952.

The current uniform for Year 11 and 12 was introduced in 1966. It was designed by the senior students of 1965 and consists of a Black Watch kilt, white blouse, green blazer, green jumper or vest, black stockings for winter and bottle green knee-high socks for summer, and black leather lace-up shoes. Girls of Scottish origin are permitted wear the kilt pin representing their family or clan name, rather than the standard school pin. A green and Black Watch Tam o' Shanter (known as 'the Beret') was also introduced for all grades a few years earlier.

The girls found the school's distinctive Beret difficult to wear, so it was phased out in 1995. It was replaced by the current Panama hat, but the Beret was reintroduced in 2003 as an addition to the Pipes and Drums uniform.

The current junior (R–10) uniform was introduced in 1997. In summer, girls wear a Black Watch tunic, short-sleeve white blouse, green blazer with tartan piping, short green socks and black leather shoes. The winter uniform consists of the tunic, long-sleeve white blouse, the blazer, green jumper or vest, Black Watch Tartan tie, Black Watch Tartan scarf and either green knee-high socks or black stockings. School pockets are awarded for student achievements, and are embroidered in red on the pockets of junior blazers (R–10 girls), and white on the left breast of senior blazers (11–12 girls).

=== College tartan ===
The school has adopted the Black Watch tartan of the Royal Highland Regiment as its school and Pipes and Drums uniform. PLC was granted permission to wear the tartan after its brother school, The Scots College, was issued a royal decree allowing them to use Black Watch as their Pipes & Drums and Cadets uniform. The Black Watch is the oldest of the highland regiments. The 1958 Aurora Australis (the school yearbook) explained the tartan's origin: "This tartan was specially designed for the regiment to prevent the jealousy which would have been aroused, if any existing clan tartan had been used."

== House system ==
The house system was established by Dr. John Marden, shortly after the opening of the school, with three houses: East, West and Boarders. In 1924 the senior houses were reorganised and renamed Kinross, Harper and Ferguson (with Anderson added in 1968), followed in 1926 by the introduction of junior houses, named Vicars and McQueen (with Thompson added in 1937). The school moved to four houses in 1979, from primary to secondary, and thus the junior houses disappeared. Finally, two new houses named Pickard and Wilkie were introduced in 1995. The Houses are named after women and men who have made a significant contribution to the life of the college.

Anderson Mrs E.O. Anderson attended PLC from 1898 to 1902. She was an original member of the Committee of the Ex-Students' Union in 1906, then President (1927–1932), and Patroness from 1936. In 1932 she petitioned the Assembly for the appointment of women to the PLC Council. Anderson was a member of the Council (1932–1958), and a benefactor to the college all her life.

Ferguson Rev John Ferguson was a minister of St Stephen's Church, Sydney, and in 1917, Acting Principal of St Andrew's College at the University of Sydney. He was appointed Senior Chaplain and Chairman of the PLC Council in 1913, serving until 1923.

Harper Andrew Harper was the third Principal of PLC Melbourne (1879–1888). He then lectured at Ormond Theological College, Melbourne before coming to Sydney, where he was Principal of St Andrew's College (1902–1923). He was Chairman of the PLC Council from 1907 until 1913.

Kinross John Kinross was a Presbyterian minister at Kiama (1858–1875). He then became Principal of St Andrew's College from 1875 until 1901, and Chairman of the PLC Council from 1888 until 1906.

Pickard Marion Pickard was appointed to the college as a teaching governess in June 1888. She was Lady Superintendent from 1894 until her resignation in 1907. In 1905 Pickard was elected the first President of the Ex-Students' Union.

Wilkie Dr Helen Wilkie was the second Headmistress at PLC Armidale (1938–1941), and then the fourth Principal of PLC Sydney (1942–1946). On her appointment to Croydon she was immediately confronted with the takeover by the RAAF, and organised the move of the College to Strathfield.

== Ex-Students' Union ==
The Ex-Students' Union is the school's alumnae association, inaugurated on 9 December 1905. At the invitation of Dr. Marden several former students discussed the proposal, elected Marion Pickard (who was at that time Lady Superintendent) as their President, and formed a committee to produce a constitution. These actions were confirmed at a General Meeting on Jersey Day 1906, and the committee took office until 1907. In the beginning, the main objectives of the Union were "the accumulation of a special fund to be devoted to the erection of a chapel and library at the College, and an Ex-Students' prize to be awarded annually to the girl most proficient in work and sport."^{[d]}

The Union achieved much in its first few years: renting a building in the CBD to serve as a club and committee meeting place, making garments for hospitals, visiting kindergartens, the YWCA, Home of Peace, Infants' Home and the Royal Institute for Deaf and Blind Children. An Ex-Students' Orchestra and Dramatic Club were formed, and tennis and croquet matches were held between current and former pupils.

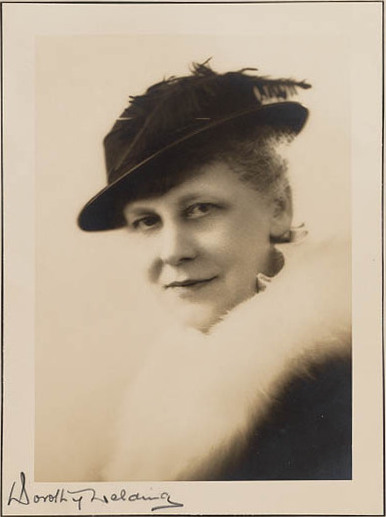
Florence Taylor, Class of 1896

In 1916 the Pymble College was opened and its first Ex-Students' Union expressed an interest in joining that of PLC. Subsequently, a combined Union was formed, known as the PLC Croydon and Pymble Ex-Students' Union, and an Ex-Students' prize was established at Pymble on the same conditions as at Croydon.

One of the Union's most significant contributions to the school was planned following the death of Dr. Marden in 1924. With the desire to provide Marden with a "fitting and lasting memorial", it was decided that a library, to be called the John Marden Memorial Library, should be built at the Croydon College. This building was opened by Mrs. Marden in 1927 and although no longer suitable as a library due its size, it remains a treasured part of the school.

In 1929, it was proposed that "Pymble students should form a separate Union" and that an equitable division of Union funds should be undertaken. This explains the two separate groups that exist today, however, it is still not uncommon for Pymble students to attend Croydon reunions and events, particularly regional or interstate activities.

=== Notable alumnae ===
Alumnae of the Presbyterian Ladies' College, Sydney are commonly referred to as PLC Old Girls, and may elect to join the schools alumnae association, the PLC Ex-Students' Union.

Notable among these women are Sibyl Morrison, the first female barrister in New South Wales, Marie Byles, the first practicing female solicitor in New South Wales, Jessie Aspinall, the first female junior resident medical officer at Royal Prince Alfred Hospital, Florence Mary Taylor, the first qualified female architect and first woman to train as an engineer in Australia, and the first woman in Australia to fly in a heavier-than-air craft, and Annabelle Williams, Commonwealth Games Medallist and current world-record holder of the EAD 100m freestyle (S9 classification).

== Gallery ==
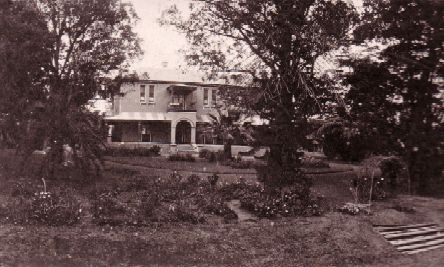
Fernlea, PLC's first home in Ashfield, c. 1888

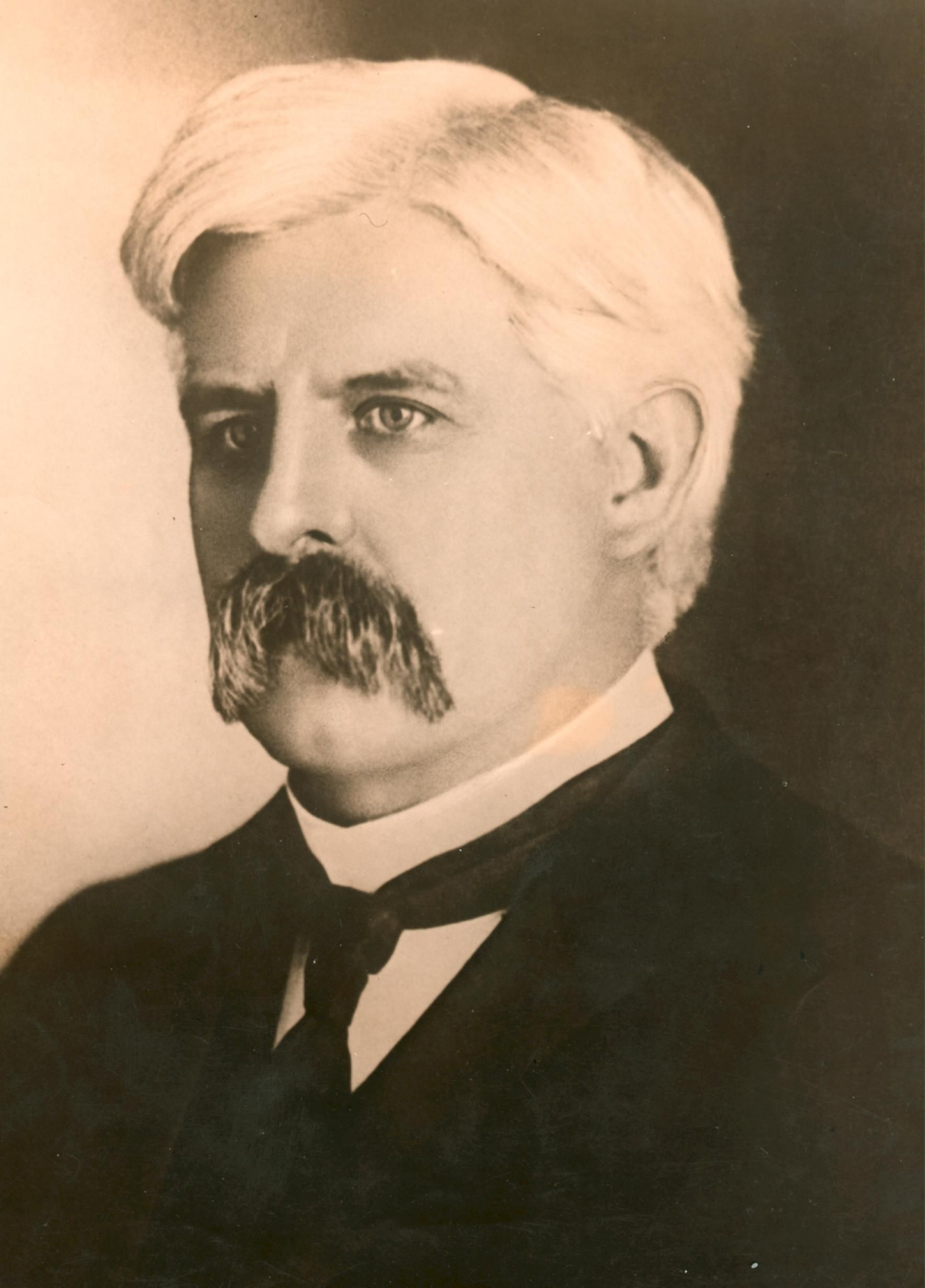
PLC's first principal, Dr John Marden

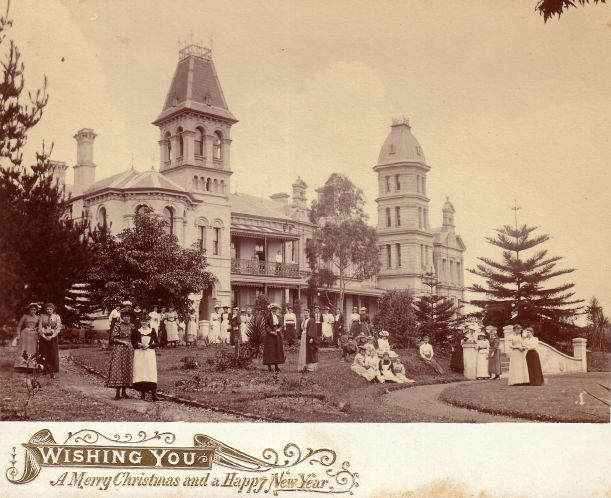
Shubra Hall and PLC students, 1892

Sketch of PLC, featuring gardens and the Shubra Hall and Main School towers, c. 1935

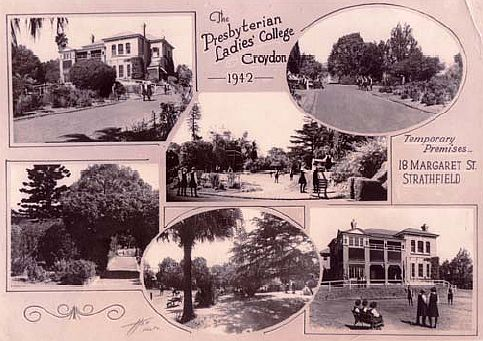
Advertisement for PLC at its temporary residence in Strathfield, 1942

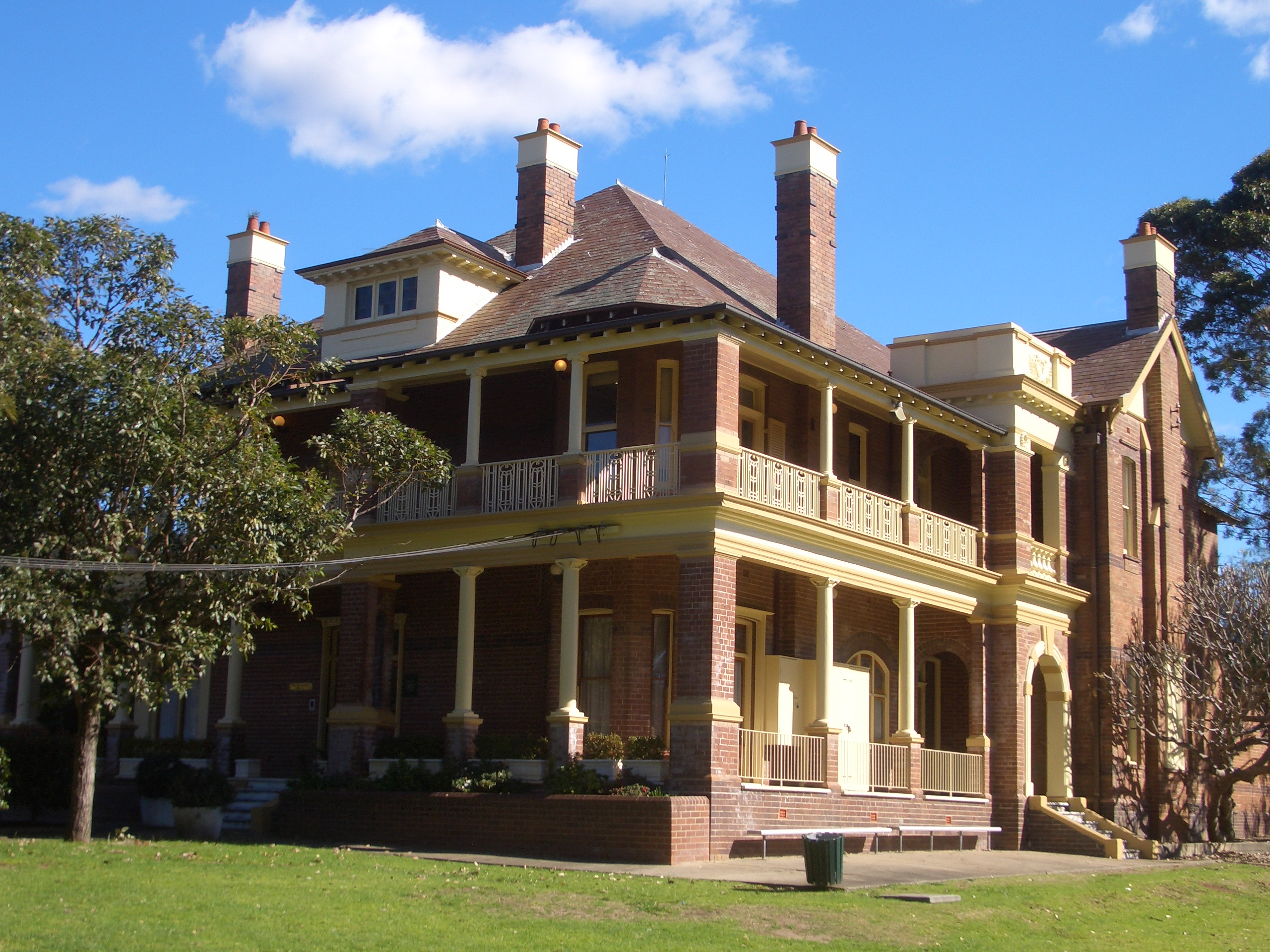
Lauriston, Part of PLC's wartime Strathfield campus

PLC Sydney 120 year anniversary logo

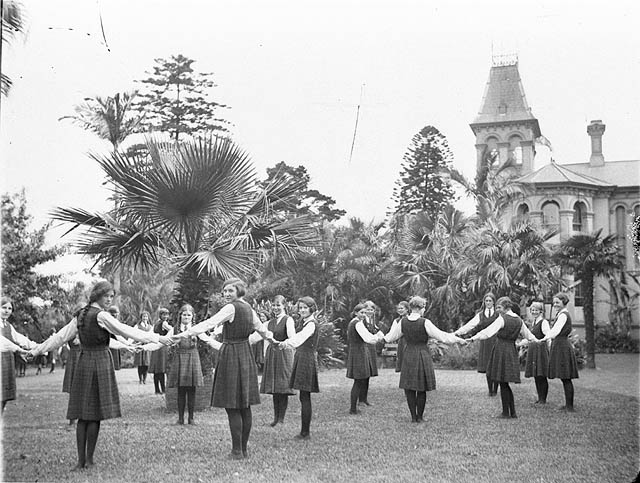
PLC pupils doing eurythmics, c. 1930s

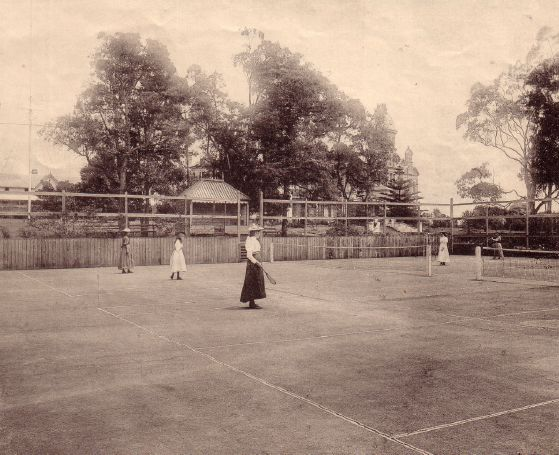
Tennis courts at Croydon, 1894

== See also ==
- List of non-government schools in New South Wales
- List of boarding schools in Australia
- Head of the River (New South Wales)
- Vietnam-Australia School, Hanoi
- Shubra Hall

== Notes ==
- Branxton served as a co-educational prep school for the college until 1996, when it was sold to Meriden School and its name reverted to "Lingwood".
- The proposal to build a Chapel was abandoned in 1907, and subsequently no Chapel has ever been erected at PLC.
