= List of girls' schools in Australia =

This is a list of girls' schools in Australia.

== Australian Capital Territory ==
- Canberra Girls Grammar School, Deakin
- Merici College, Braddon
- St Clare's College, Griffith

== New South Wales ==
- Abbotsleigh, Wahroonga
- Ascham School, Edgecliff
- Asquith Girls High School, Asquith
- Bankstown Girls High School, Bankstown
- Beverly Hills Girls High School, Beverly Hills
- Birrong Girls High School, Birrong
- Blacktown Girls High School, Blacktown
- Brigidine College, Randwick
- Brigidine College, St Ives
- Caroline Chisholm College, Glenmore Park
- Catherine McAuley Westmead, Westmead
- Cerdon College, Merrylands
- Cheltenham Girls High School, Cheltenham
- Domremy College, Five Dock
- East Hills Girls High School, Panania
- Frensham School, Mittagong
- Hornsby Girls' High School, Hornsby
- Liverpool Girls High School, Liverpool
- Loreto Kirribilli, Kirribilli
- Loreto Normanhurst, Normanhurst
- Mackellar Girls Campus, Manly Vale
- MacKillop College, Bathurst
- Marist Sisters' College, Woolwich
- Mary MacKillop Catholic College, Wakeley
- MLC School, Burwood
- Montgrove College, Orchard Hills
- Mount St Benedict College, Pennant Hills
- Mount Saint Joseph, Milperra
- Muslim Girls Grammar School, Granville
- Nagle College, Blacktown
- North Sydney Girls High School, Crows Nest
- Our Lady of Mercy College, Burraneer
- Our Lady of the Sacred Heart College, Kensington
- Pymble Ladies' College, Pymble
- Queenwood School for Girls, Mosman
- Ravenswood School for Girls, Gordon
- Riverside Girls High School, Huntleys Point
- Roseville College, Roseville
- St George Girls High School, Kogarah
- St Joseph's College, Gosford
- St Mary Star of the Sea College, Wollongong
- St Patrick's College, Campbelltown
- St Scholastica's College, Glebe Point
- Saint Ursula's College, Kingsgrove
- St Vincent's College, Potts Point
- SCEGGS Darlinghurst, Darlinghurst
- Stella Maris College, Manly
- Sydney Girls High School, Moore Park
- Tangara School for Girls, Cherrybrook
- Tara Anglican School for Girls, North Parramatta
- Wiley Park Girls High School, Wiley Park
- Willoughby Girls High School, Willoughby

Armidale

- New England Girls' School
- Presbyterian Ladies' College

Croydon

- Burwood Girls High School
- Presbyterian Ladies' College

Hurstville

- Bethany College
- Danebank

North Sydney

- Monte Sant'Angelo Mercy College
- Wenona School

Parramatta

- Macarthur Girls High School
- Our Lady of Mercy College

Rose Bay

- Kambala School
- Kincoppal School

Strathfield

- Meriden School
- Santa Sabina College
- Strathfield Girls High School

Waverley

- St Catherine's School
- St Clare's College

== Queensland ==
- All Hallows' School, Fortitude Valley
- Brigidine College, Indooroopilly
- Brisbane Girls Grammar School, Spring Hill
- Loreto College, Coorparoo
- Lourdes Hill College, Hawthorne
- Mary MacKillop College, Nundah
- Moreton Bay College, Manly West
- Mount Alvernia College, Kedron
- Mt St Michael's College, Ashgrove
- Our Lady's College, Annerley
- Rockhampton Girls Grammar School, The Range
- St Aidan's Anglican Girls' School, Corinda
- St Hilda's School, Southport
- St John Fisher College, Bracken Ridge
- St Margaret Mary's College, Hyde Park
- St Margaret's Anglican Girls' School, Ascot
- St Patrick's College, Townsville
- St Rita's College, Clayfield
- St Saviour's College, South Toowoomba
- St Ursula's College, Yeppoon
- San Sisto College, Carina
- Somerville House, South Brisbane
- Stuartholme School, Toowong

Ipswich

- Ipswich Girls' Grammar School
- St Mary's College

Toowoomba

- Fairholme College
- The Glennie School
- St Ursula's College

== South Australia ==
- Kildare College, Holden Hill
- Loreto College, Marryatville
- Mary MacKillop College, Kensington
- Mitcham Girls High School, Kingswood
- Our Lady of the Sacred Heart College, Enfield
- St Dominic's Priory College, North Adelaide
- St Peter's Girls' School, Stonyfell
- Seymour College, Glen Osmond
- Walford Anglican School for Girls, Hyde Park
- Wilderness School, Medindie

Adelaide

- Roma Mitchell Secondary College (Girls' Education Campus)
- St Aloysius College
- St Mary's College

== Tasmania ==
Hobart

- St Mary's College
- St Michael's Collegiate School

Sandy Bay

- Fahan School
- Mount Carmel College

== Victoria ==
- Academy of Mary Immaculate, Fitzroy
- Ave Maria College, Aberfeldie
- Avila College, Mount Waverley
- Beth Rivkah Ladies College, East St Kilda
- Catholic Ladies College, Eltham
- Clonard College, Herne Hill
- Fintona Girls' School, Balwyn
- Harkaway Hills College, Narre Warren
- Ivanhoe Girls' Grammar School, Ivanhoe
- Killester College, Springvale
- Lauriston Girls' School, Armadale
- Loreto College, Ballarat
- Mac.Robertson Girls' High School, Albert Park
- Marian College, Sunshine West
- Mater Christi College, Belgrave
- Matthew Flinders Girls Secondary College, Geelong
- Melbourne Girls Grammar School, South Yarra
- Melbourne Girls' College, Richmond
- Mercy College, Coburg
- Mount St Joseph Girls' College, Altona
- Our Lady of Mercy College, Heidelberg
- Our Lady of Sion College, Box Hill
- Our Lady of the Sacred Heart College, Bentleigh
- Pascoe Vale Girls College, Pascoe Vale
- Presbyterian Ladies' College, Burwood
- Sacred Heart College, Newtown
- Sacred Heart Girls' College, Oakleigh
- St Margaret's Berwick Grammar School, Berwick (coed K-6/11–12)
- Santa Maria College, Northcote
- Siena College, Camberwell
- Toorak College, Mount Eliza
- Worawa Aboriginal College, Healesville

Brighton

- Firbank Grammar School (coed ELC-6)
- Star of the Sea College

Canterbury

- Camberwell Girls Grammar School
- Canterbury Girls' Secondary College
- Strathcona Baptist Girls Grammar School

Essendon

- Lowther Hall Anglican Grammar School
- St Columba's College

Glen Iris

- Korowa Anglican Girls' School
- Sacré Cœur School

Kew

- Genazzano FCJ College
- Methodist Ladies' College
- Ruyton Girls' School

Mentone

- Kilbreda College
- Mentone Girls' Grammar School
- Mentone Girls' Secondary College

Toorak

- Loreto Mandeville Hall
- St Catherine's School

== Western Australia ==
- Mercedes College, Perth
- Methodist Ladies' College, Claremont
- Penrhos College, Como
- Perth College, Mount Lawley
- Presbyterian Ladies' College, Peppermint Grove
- St Brigid's College, Lesmurdie
- St Mary's Anglican Girls' School, Karrinyup
- Santa Maria College, Attadale

Mosman Park

- Iona Presentation College
- St Hilda's Anglican School for Girls

== Former girls' schools ==
New South Wales

- Annesley Methodist Girls College, Bowral (closed)
- Bethlehem College, Ashfield merged with De La Salle College Ashfield to become St. Vincent's College in 2023.
- Biloela Industrial School for Girls, Cockatoo Island (1871–1887)
- Calrossy Anglican School, East Tamworth became coed in 2006.
- Claremont College, Randwick became a coeducational junior school.
- Cootamundra Domestic Training Home for Aboriginal Girls, Cootamundra (1911–1968)
- Cremorne Girls High School, Cremorne (1927–1987)
- Hunter Girls' High School/Newcastle Girls' High School, Newcastle became the coeducational Newcastle High School.
- Marsden School, Bathurst merged into Scots All Saints' College in 1977.
- Newcastle Girls' Grammar School, Newcastle merged with Newcastle Boys' Grammar School to become the coeducational Newcastle Grammar School in 1978.
- Newcastle Industrial School for Girls, Newcastle (1867–1887)
- Normanhurst School, Ashfield (1882–1941)
- Osborne Ladies' College, Blackheath (1923–1958)
- Pallister, Greenwich (closed)
- Parramatta Girls Home, Parramatta (1887–1974)
- Petersham Girls High School, Petersham merged with Newtown Boys High School to become Newtown High School of the Performing Arts in 1990.
- Presbyterian Ladies’ College, Goulburn (closed)
- Presbyterian Ladies’ College/Kinross School, Orange merged with Wolaroi Methodist Boys' College to become Kinross Wolaroi School in 1973.
- Randwick Girls' High School, Randwick merged with Randwick Boys' High School to become Randwick High School in 2025.
- Redlands, Cremorne became coeducational in 1978.
- Rosebank College, Five Dock became coeducational in 2009.
- St Gabriel's School, Waverley (closed)
- St Luke's Church of England Girls School, Northern Beaches merged with Roseby Preparatory School to become St Luke's Grammar School in 1993.
- Stratford School for Girls, Lawson (closed)
- Woodcourt College, Marrickville (1905–1935)
- Woodstock Presbyterian Girls School, Albury merged with Albury Grammar School to become Scots School Albury in 1972.

Queensland

- Blackheath College, Charters Towers merged with Thornburgh College to become Blackheath and Thornburgh College in 1982.
- Brisbane South Girls and Infants School, South Brisbane (1864–1928)
- The Cathedral School of St Anne and St James, Mundingburra became coeducational in 1979.
- Clayfield College, Clayfield became coeducational in 2021.
- Maryborough Girls' High School, Maryborough merged with Maryborough Boys' Grammar School to become Maryborough State High School in 1974.
- Presbyterian Girls’ College, Warwick merged with Scots College to become Scots PGC College in 1970.
- St Catherine’s School, Warwick (closed)
- St Faith’s School, Yeppoon (closed)
- St Gabriel’s School, Charters Towers merged with All Souls School to become All Saints St Gabriel's School.
- St Mary’s School, Herberton (closed)

South Australia

- Advanced School for Girls, Adelaide merged into Adelaide High School in 1907.
- Annesley College/Methodist Ladies' College, Wayville became the coeducational Annesley Junior School in 2011.
- Cabra Dominican College, Cumberland Park became coeducational in 1978.
- Girton House Girls’ School, Kensington Park merged with King's College to become the Pembroke School in 1974.
- Knightsbridge School, Lebrook (1886–1921)
- Marymount College, Mitchell Park merged into Sacred Heart College Middle School in 2019.
- Mercedes College, Springfield became coeducational in 1976.
- Stawell School, Mount Lofty (1927–1940)
- Tormore House School, North Adelaide (1876–1920)
- Woodlands CEGGS, Glenelg merged with St Peter's Glenelg to become St Peter's Woodlands Grammar School in 1999.

Tasmania

- Ogilvie High School, Hobart merged with New Town High School (Tasmania) to become Hobart City High School in 2022.

Victoria

- Alexandra College, Hamilton merged with the Hamilton and Western District Boys' College to become The Hamilton and Alexandra College in 1962.
- Cato College, Elsternwick merged into Wesley College, Melbourne in 1989.
- Clarendon Presbyterian Girls’ College, Ballarat merged with Clarendon College to become the coeducational Ballarat Clarendon College.
- Clyde School, St Kilda merged with Geelong Church of England Girls Grammar School, Geelong and Geelong Church of England Grammar School to become Geelong Grammar School in 1976.
- Kilvington Girls' Grammar School, Ormond became the coeducational Kilvington Grammar School.
- Morongo Girls' College, Bell Post Hill (1920–1994)
- Mount Lilydale Mercy College, Lilydale became coeducational in 1975.
- Penleigh Presbyterian Ladies' College, Moonee Ponds merged with Essendon Grammar School to become Penleigh and Essendon Grammar School in 1977.
- Presentation College, Windsor (1873–2020)
- Queen’s College/Ballarat Girls Grammar School, Wendouree merged into Ballarat Grammar School in 1973.
- St Aloysius' College, North Melbourne became coeducational in 2023.
- St Ambrose's School, Brunswick (1885–2008)
- St Anne’s School, Sale became the Junior campus of Gippsland Grammar School.
- St Leonard's Presbyterian Girls' College, Brighton East became the coeducational St Leonard's College in 1972.
- St Mary's Primary School, West Melbourne (1855–1996)
- Stratherne Presbyterian Girls Grammar School, Hawthorn (closed)
- Tintern Grammar, Ringwood East became coeducational in 1999.

Western Australia

- Kobeelya Girls Grammar, Katanning (closed)
- Loreto Convent, Claremont merged with St. Louis School, Claremont, Western Australia to become John XXIII College, Perth in 1977.
- Sacred Heart College, Sorrento became coeducational in 1977.

== See also ==
- Association of Heads of Independent Girls' Schools
- Queensland Girls' Secondary Schools Sports Association
- List of boys' schools in Australia
