= Alliance of Girls' Schools Australasia =

Non-profit organization

- Abbreviation: AGSA
- Predecessor: Education of Girls in Girls’ Schools Focus Group
- Formation: 18 August 1997; 29 years ago
- Legal status: Non-profit organisation
- Purpose: Promotion of single-sex education for girls
- Region served: Australia; Hong Kong; Japan; New Zealand; Philippines; Singapore; South Africa; Zimbabwe
- Members: 184 (2019)
- Executive Officer: Loren Bridge
- Affiliations: Association of Heads of Independent Girls Schools; Girl Guides Australia; Australian Gender Equity Council; Women Donors; Girls' Schools Association; Girls Sports Victoria; National Coalition of Girls' Schools; The Women's College, University of Sydney
- Website: girlsschools.org

The Alliance of Girls' Schools Australasia (abbreviated as AGSA) is a non-profit organisation that promotes the education of girls in single-sex girls' schools, and promotes the image of, and support the development of, girls' schools in Australasia.

The Alliance's first annual general meeting was held in May 1996, where membership of the Alliance was extended to all girls' schools in Australia and New Zealand whether independent, government or Catholic. The Alliance was incorporated 18 August 1997.

The alliance currently accepts membership from any school in Australia, Hong Kong, Japan, New Zealand, the Philippines, Singapore, South Africa and Zimbabwe which educates girls only.

It is affiliated with the Girls' Schools Association (GSA, UK) and the International Coalition of Girls' Schools (ICGS, US).

In 2022, AGSA agreed to merge with the International Coalition of Girls' Schools. The combined organization will include over 500 schools in 18 countries that enroll over 300,000 students. AGSA plans to fully adopt the International Coalition of Girls' Schools name in November 2023.

== Membership ==
As of May 2019, the Alliance comprised 184 schools:

1. Abbotsleigh
2. All Hallows' School
3. Ascham School
4. Ave Maria College
5. Avila College
6. Baradene College
7. Bethlehem College, Ashfield
8. Brigidine College, Indooroopilly
9. Brigidine College, St Ives
10. Brisbane Girls Grammar School
11. Camberwell Girls Grammar School
12. Canberra Girls' Grammar School
13. Canterbury Girls' Secondary College
14. Carmel College
15. Caroline Chisholm College
16. Catherine McAuley Westmead
17. Catholic Ladies College
18. Chilton Saint James School
19. Chisipite Senior School
20. Christchurch Girls' High School
21. Clayfield College
22. Clonard College
23. Columba College
24. Craighead Diocesan School
25. Danebank
26. Diocesan School for Girls (Auckland)
27. Domremy College
28. Fahan School
29. Fairholme College
30. Fintona Girls' School
31. Firbank Grammar School
32. Frensham School
33. Genazzano FCJ College
34. Georges River College (Penshurst Girls Campus)
35. Good Hope School
36. Hamilton Girls' High School
37. International School of the Sacred Heart
38. Iona College
39. Iona Presentation College
40. Ipswich Girls' Grammar School
41. Ivanhoe Girls' Grammar School
42. Kambala School
43. Kilbreda College
44. Kildare College
45. Kincoppal School
46. Knox Grammar School
47. Korowa Anglican Girls' School
48. Lauriston Girls' School
49. Loreto College Coorparoo
50. Loreto Kirribilli
51. Loreto Mandeville Hall
52. Loreto College, Marryatville
53. Loreto Normanhurst
54. Loreto College Ballarat
55. Lourdes Hill College
56. Lowther Hall Anglican Grammar School
57. MacKillop College, Bathurst
58. Mac.Robertson Girls' High School
59. Marist Sisters' College, Woolwich
60. Marlborough Girls' College
61. Mary MacKillop College, Kensington
62. Mary MacKillop College, Brisbane
63. Mater Christi College
64. Melbourne Girls' College
65. Melbourne Girls Grammar
66. Mentone Girls' Grammar
67. Mentone Girls' Secondary College
68. Mercedes College, Perth
69. Mercy College, Coburg
70. Merici College
71. Meriden School
72. Methodist Ladies' College, Melbourne
73. Methodist Ladies' College, Perth
74. Miriam College
75. Mitcham Girls High School
76. MLC School
77. Monte Sant'Angelo Mercy College
78. Moreton Bay College
79. Mount Carmel College, Hobart
80. Mount St Benedict College
81. Mount St Joseph Girls' College
82. Mount St Michael’s College, Ashgrove
83. Mount Alvernia College
84. Nagle College, Blacktown
85. Napier Girls' High School
86. New England Girls' School
87. Nga Tawa Diocesan School
88. Ogilvie High School
89. Ohtani Junior and Senior High School
90. Otago Girls' High School
91. Our Lady of Mercy College, Parramatta
92. Our Lady of Mercy College, Victoria
93. Our Lady of Sion College
94. Our Lady of the Sacred Heart College, Adelaide
95. Our Lady of the Sacred Heart College, Bentleigh
96. Our Lady of the Sacred Heart College, Sydney
97. Palmerston North Girls' High School
98. Penrhos College, Perth
99. Perth College (Western Australia)
100. Presbyterian Ladies' College, Armidale
101. Presbyterian Ladies' College, Melbourne
102. Presbyterian Ladies' College, Perth
103. Presbyterian Ladies' College, Sydney
104. Pymble Ladies' College
105. Queen Margaret College (Wellington)
106. Queenwood School for Girls
107. Randwick Girls' High School
108. Rangi Ruru Girls' School
109. Ravenswood School for Girls
110. Rockhampton Girls Grammar School
111. Roma Mitchell Secondary College (Girls' Education Campus)
112. Roseville College
113. Rotorua Girls' High School
114. Ruyton Girls' School
115. Sacré Cœur School
116. Sacred Heart College, Geelong
117. Sacred Heart Girls' College
118. St Aidan's Anglican Girls' School
119. St Aloysius College, Adelaide
120. St Aloysius' College (Melbourne)
121. St Brigid's College
122. St Catherine's School, Toorak
123. St Catherine's School, Waverley
124. St Clare's College, Canberra
125. St Clare's College, Waverley
126. St Columba's College, Melbourne
127. St Cuthbert's College, Auckland
128. St Hilda's Anglican School for Girls
129. St Hilda's Collegiate
130. St Hilda's School
131. St John Fisher College, Bracken Ridge
132. Saint Kentigern School for Girls
133. St Margaret Mary's College
134. St Margaret's Anglican Girls' School
135. St Margaret's College, Christchurch
136. St Margaret's School, Melbourne
137. St Mary's Anglican Girls' School
138. St Mary's College, Adelaide
139. St Mary's College, Hobart
140. St Mary's College, Ipswich
141. St Mary Star of the Sea College, Wollongong
142. St Matthew's Collegiate School
143. St Michael's Collegiate School
144. St Monica's College
145. St Rita's College
146. St Oran's College
147. St Patrick's College, Townsville
148. St Patrick's College, Campbelltown
149. St Peter's Girls' School
150. St Scholastica's College
151. St Stithian's Girls' College
152. St Ursula's College, Kingsgrove
153. St Ursula's College, Toowoomba
154. St Ursula's College, Yeppoon
155. St Vincent's College, Potts Point
156. Samuel Marsden Collegiate School
157. Santa Maria College, Melbourne
158. Santa Maria College, Perth
159. Santa Sabina College
160. SCEGGS Darlinghurst
161. Selwyn House
162. Seymour College
163. Shelford Girls' Grammar
164. Siena College
165. Somerville House
166. Star of the Sea College
167. Stella Maris College
168. Strathcona Baptist Girls' Grammar School
169. Stuartholme School
170. Tangara School for Girls
171. Tara Anglican School for Girls
172. Taranaki Diocesan School for Girls
173. The Glennie School
174. Timaru Girls' High School
175. Toorak College
176. Waikato Diocesan School for Girls
177. Waitaki Girls' High School
178. Walford Anglican School for Girls
179. Wellington Girls' College
180. Wenona School
181. Westlake Girls High School
182. Wilderness School
183. Woodford House
184. Worawa Aboriginal College

Former members

- Raffles Girls' School (Secondary) (Singapore)
