= Girls Sport Victoria =

School sporting association in Australia

Girls' Sport Victoria
- Abbreviation: GSV
- Formation: 2001; 25 years ago
- Headquarters: Sports House; Albert Park, Victoria, Australia
- Location: Melbourne, Victoria
- Members: 23 member schools (~21,000 students collectively)
- Official language: English
- President: Linda Douglas (Ruyton Girls' School)
- Executive Officer: Michelle Barry
- Website: gsv.vic.edu.au

Girls' Sport Victoria (GSV) was established in 2001, and is one of the largest independent school sporting associations in Victoria, Australia, with 23 member schools from around Melbourne.

GSV provides approximately 16,500 girls, from years seven to twelve, with the opportunity to be involved in over 20 sports through weekly competitions, carnivals, tournaments and skill development programs.

== Schools ==
=== Current member schools ===
Member School	Location	Enrolment	Founded	Denomination	Principal	Day/ Boarding	Year Entered Competition	School Colours
Camberwell Girls Grammar School	Canterbury	777	1920	Anglican	Debbie Dunwoody	Day	2000	Navy and white
Fintona Girls' School	Balwyn	533	1896	Non-Denominational	Rachael Falloon	Day	2000	Navy and gold
Firbank Grammar School	Brighton	1,046	1909	Anglican	Jenny Williams	Day & Boarding	2000	Gold, green and white
Genazzano FCJ College	Kew	680	1889	Roman Catholic	Loretta Wholley	Day & Boarding	2000	Maroon, navy and silver
Ivanhoe Girls' Grammar School	Ivanhoe	850	1903	Anglican	Narelle Umbers	Day	2000	Royal blue, chocolate and white
Korowa Anglican Girls' School	Glen Iris	774	1890	Anglican	Frances Booth	Day	2000	Cherry and dark grey
Lauriston Girls' School	Armadale	935	1901	Non-Denominational	Sabine Partington	Day	2000	Navy and white
Loreto Mandeville Hall	Toorak	1,220	1924	Roman Catholic	Angela O'Dwyer	Day	2000	Royal blue and gold
Lowther Hall Anglican Grammar School	Essendon	859	1920	Anglican	Elisabeth Rhodes	Day	2000	Navy, sky blue and gold
Melbourne Girls Grammar School	South Yarra	1,046	1893	Anglican	Toni Meath	Day & Boarding	2000	Navy and white
Mentone Girls' Grammar School	Mentone	560	1899	Anglican	Lauren Perfect	Day	2000	Red, navy and gold
Methodist Ladies' College	Kew	2,169	1882	Uniting Church	Julia Shea	Day & Boarding	2000	Dark green and silver
Our Lady of Mercy College	Heidelberg	1,175	1910	Roman Catholic	Judith Weir	Day	2000	Navy, maroon and white
Our Lady of Sion College	Box Hill	930	1928	Roman Catholic	Rebecca Cetrola	Day	2015	Cherry, black and white
Presbyterian Ladies' College	Burwood	1,530	1875	Presbyterian	Emma Burgess	Day & Boarding	2000	Blue, gold and black
Ruyton Girls' School	Kew	854	1878	Non-denominational	Kim Bence	Day	2000	Navy and yellow
Sacré Cœur	Glen Iris	659	1888	Roman Catholic	Adelina Melia-Douvos	Day	2000	Turquoise, navy and white
St Catherine's School	Toorak	685	1896	Non-Denominational	Natalie Charles	Day & Boarding	2000	Navy, light blue and gold
St Margaret's Berwick Grammar School	Berwick	980 (593 Girls)	1926	Non-Denominational	Annette Rome	Day	2000	Red, navy and old gold
Siena College	Camberwell	691	1940	Roman Catholic	Sarah Tymensen	Day	2010	Sienna, black and white
Star of the Sea College	Brighton	1,240	1883	Roman Catholic	Mary O'Connor	Day	2000	Navy and red
Strathcona Girls' Grammar School	Canterbury	814	1924	Baptist	Lorna Beegan	Day	2000	Navy and gold
Toorak College	Mount Eliza	901	1874	Anglican	Kristy Kendall	Day & Boarding	2000	Navy, red and gold

=== Former member schools ===
School	Location	Founded	Years Competed	Denomination	Day/ Boarding	School Colours
Kilvington Grammar	Ormond	1923	2000–2011	Baptist	Day	Navy, light blue, gold and magenta
Shelford Girls' Grammar	Caulfield	1898	2000–2024	Anglican	Day	Navy, light blue and gold
Tintern Grammar	Ringwood	1877	2000–2009	Anglican	Day & Boarding	Navy, green maroon and white

== History ==
In 1999, the principal of Melbourne Girls Grammar School, Christine Briggs, held a meeting of principals of girls' schools at the Lyceum Club. She felt the need to organise the meeting after receiving a letter of invitation from the Associated Public Schools of Victoria (APS) inviting her school to join their association. The other schools invited included Firbank Grammar School, Genazzano FCJ College, Loreto Mandeville Hall, Presbyterian Ladies' College and Toorak College.

Many APS boys' schools had introduced co-education and were finding it difficult to provide adequate inter-school sports experiences for their female students. As the oldest schools association, APS felt it was in a strong position to convince independent girls' schools to become members. Briggs was concerned that the APS saw girls' schools as the solution to their problem, and was aware that girls' schools were fragmented into so many sporting associations, that the approach might be successful for the APS, but harming girls' schools.

Briggs put the issue of girls' sport to the principals at the meeting, and it was agreed that it was time to consider the idea of a new sports organisation catering for the needs of all-female schools. It was stressed by many that the heritage of girls' sport built over more than a century by the involved schools could not be abandoned or seriously affected.

Following this meeting, a forum was led by Diana Bowman, the former principal of SCEGGS Darlinghurst in New South Wales, who had much experience with the successful and foremost girls' sporting association in her State, the Independent Girls' Schools Sporting Association (the sporting arm of the Association of Heads of Independent Girls' Schools). It was at this forum that the decision was made to create a new sports organisation to which the 24 girls' schools could belong, and that existing Associations would then cease to exist. In the same year, the name "Girls Sport Victoria" was selected for the new organisation. Further, it was acknowledged that creating "Girls Sport Victoria" would take time, and therefore a Project Officer was needed to undertake the task. Fiona Preston was the person selected, and began work immediately in order to complete preparations for the commencement of the sports program in 2001. She was supported by a Committee of Principals, a Committee of Heads of Sport, and working committees for each sport.

Preston, along with the first executive officer, Meredith Prime, and a small group of staff, created a program of sports and three major carnivals, track and field, swimming and diving, and cross country in three Divisions. Zoned groups of schools were established for weekly interschool competitions in netball, basketball, softball, tennis, indoor cricket, hockey, water polo, soccer, volleyball, and badminton. In addition, Saturday morning sport, which was especially attractive to boarding schools, offered golf, Australian rules football, taekwondo, and triathlon. Also organised were seasonal competitions in cricket and Surf League, and 'fun days' for students in Years 7 and 8.

Many challenges were met by the organisers, such as the vast geographic spread of the schools; the varying size of schools, ranging from 300 to almost 2000 students; the differences in quality and number of sports facilities within and outside schools; the difference in strength between schools and within sports; the cost to schools to meet their responsibilities; concern about potential loss of academic time through travel to venues; the determination of GSV rules and regulations; talent identification; promotion of leadership opportunities; and the availability of quality umpiring.

== Previous associations ==
Prior to the establishment of Girls' Sport Victoria, there were seven girls' schools sporting associations catering to the sporting needs of the 24 GSV schools, and a small number of other schools. These associations were subsequently disbanded in 2001.

=== Associated Anglican Girls’ Grammar Schools (1920–2000) ===
Church Secondary Schools Sports Association, later the Associated Anglican Girls’ Grammar Schools (AAGGS), was created in 1920 and conducted the first combined girls’ schools sports day in Victoria on 30 April 1920, at Toorak Park, Armadale. The first cultural event held by the Associated Church of England Girls’ Grammar Schools was a Combined Choir Festival at the St Kilda Town Hall on Thursday 9 October 1941, in aid of Red Cross Funds with the guest of honour being Miss Una Bourne.

School	Years Competed
Camberwell Girls Grammar School	1944–2000
Firbank Girls' Grammar School	1920–2000
Ivanhoe Girls' Grammar School	1925–2000
Korowa Anglican Girls' School	1920–2000
Lowther Hall Anglican Grammar School	1921–2000
Melbourne Girls Grammar	1960–2000
Mentone Girls' Grammar School	1964–2000
Shelford Girls' Grammar	1944–2000
St Michael's Grammar School	1920–1980s
Tintern Girls Grammar School	1920–1951

=== Girls' Schools Association (1920–2000) ===
The Girls' Secondary Schools Sports Association (GSSSA), later the Girls' Schools Sports Association (GSSA) was formed in 1920. In the early 1990s, it changed its name to the Girls Schools Association (GSA).

School	Years Competed
Fintona Girls' School	1920–2000
Korowa Girls' School	1963–2000
Lauriston Girls' School	1920–2000
Ruyton Girls' School	1920–2000
St Catherine's School	1920–2000
Tintern Girls Grammar^	1967–2000

^Tintern participated in the Swimming Carnivals from at least 1949 – 1953 and the Athletics Carnivals from 1956 – 1958

=== Zone Sports Association (1968–2000) ===
School	Years Competed
Firbank Girls' Grammar School	1968–2000
Loreto Mandeville Hall	1980–2000
Mentone Girls' Grammar School	1968–2000
Sacré Cœur	1991–2000
Shelford Girls' Grammar	1968–2000
St Michael's Grammar School	1968–1994
Cato College (later Wesley College – Cato Campus)	1968–1989
Wesley College, Prahran Campus	1988–1989

=== Girls’ Schools Sports Association (1975–2000) ===
The "Girls’ Schools Sports Association", formerly the Eastern Suburbs Association and later the Eastern Sports Association (ESA), was formed in 1975. In 1984, Loreto Toorak was invited to participate as a non-voting member and in 1988, the girls at Wesley College were also invited to participate as a non-voting member. In 1993, Carey Grammar was asked to re-consider its membership of the new GSSA, as it was the only co-educational school in the ESA. Genazzano was invited to participate as a non-voting member in 1993 before becoming a full member the following year following the departure of Carey Grammar. Athletics and swimming carnivals were conducted and students competed in baseball, basketball, cricket, hockey, netball and tennis competitions throughout the year.

School	Years Competed
Camberwell Girls Grammar	1975–2000
Carey Grammar	1984–1993
Genazzano	1994–2000
Ivanhoe Girls Grammar	1975–2000
Melbourne Girls Grammar	1975–2000
MLC	1975–2000
PLC	1975–2000
Strathcona Girls Grammar	1975–2000

=== Public Schools Sports Association (1904–2000) ===
The Public Schools Association, later known as the Girls’ Private Schools Victorian Sports Association, was created in 1904 and conducted their first tennis competition soon thereafter.

School	Years Competed
Geelong Girls' Grammar School	1916–1975
Loreto Mandeville Hall	1991–2000
Melbourne Girls Grammar	1904–2000
Methodist Ladies' College	1904–2000
Presbyterian Ladies' College	1904–2000
Tintern Girls Grammar School	1991–2000
Toorak College	1991–2000

=== Catholic Girls Sports Association of Victoria (established 1980) ===
The Catholic Girls Sports Association of Victoria (CGSAV), formerly the Secondary Catholic Sports Association (SCSA) is a sporting body that promotes and provides sporting carnivals for a group of Catholic girls schools in Melbourne, Victoria, Australia established in 1980. Membership of the SCSA is restricted to metropolitan and country Catholic Secondary Schools, upon payment of the annual affiliation fee. Membership is open either to girls’ schools or coeducational Catholic Colleges, however events cater only for girls.

- Academy of Mary Immaculate, Fitzroy
- Ave Maria College, Aberfeldie
- Avila College, Mount Waverley
- Catholic Ladies' College, Eltham
- Clonard College, Geelong
- Harkaway Hills College, Narre Warren North
- Kilbreda College, Mentone
- Killester College, Springvale
- Marian College, Sunshine West
- Mater Christi College, Belgrave
- Mercy Diocesan College, Coburg
- Mount St Joseph Girls' College, Altona
- Our Lady of Mercy College, Heidelberg
- Our Lady of Sion College, Box Hill
- Our Lady of the Sacred Heart College, Bentleigh
- Sacred Heart College, Geelong
- Sacred Heart Girls' College, Oakleigh
- Santa Maria College, Northcote
- St Aloysius College, North Melbourne
- St Columbas College, Essendon
- St Mary's College, St Kilda

==== Former member schools ====
- Genazzano FCJ College, Kew
- Kildara College, Malvern
- Kilbride College, Albert Park
- Kilmaire College, Hawthorn
- Loreto College, Ballarat
- Loreto Mandeville Hall, Toorak
- Mount Lilydale Mercy College, Lilydale
- Presentation College, Windsor
- Sacré Cœur, Glen Iris
- Siena College, Camberwell
- Star of the Sea College, Gardenvale

=== Southern District Sports Association (? – 2000) ===
School	Years Competed
Assumption College	?–2000
Kilvington Girls' Grammar	?–2000
Lowther Hall Anglican Grammar School	?–2000
Mentone Girls' Grammar School	?–2000
Penleigh and Essendon Grammar School	?–2000
St Leonard's College	?–2000
St Margaret's School	?–2000
Toorak College	?–2000

NB: For a brief period, two Associations existed with the name "Girls' Schools Sports Association".

== Presidents of the Association ==
Term	President	School
1999–2001	Christine Briggs	Melbourne Girls Grammar
2001–2002	Anne Hunt	Loreto Mandeville Hall Toorak
2002	Rosa Storelli	Methodist Ladies' College
2002–2003	Jane Munro	Firbank Grammar School
2003–2007	Margaret Webb	Toorak College
2007–2012	Susan Stevens	Loreto Mandeville Hall Toorak
2013–2015	Christine Jenkins	Korowa Anglican Girls' School
2015 - 2020	Linda Douglas	Ruyton Girls' School
2020 - 2023	Kristy Kendall	Toorak College
2023 – 2025	Elisabeth Rhodes	Lowther Hall Anglican Grammar School
2025 - present	Loretta Wholley	Genazzano FCJ College

== Sports ==
Students from Girls Sport Victoria member schools participate in a wide range of sporting activities including:

Weekly Sports

- Australian Football
- Badminton
- Basketball
- Cricket
- Indoor Cricket
- Hockey
- Netball
- Soccer
- Softball
- Tennis
- Volleyball
- Waterpolo

Carnivals

- Cross Country
- Diving
- Swimming
- Track and Field (2023 the GSV conducted its first Years 5 & 6 Track & Field event over two days in August)

Sport Skills Program

- Cycle sport
- Diving
- Fencing

Other Events

- Basketball Tournament
- Five a side Soccer Tournament
- Golf Tournament
- Triathlon
- Year 7 Sports Expo

Representative Sport

- Cross Country
- Netball
- Soccer
- Swimming
- Volleyball
- Water Polo

Head of the Schoolgirls Regatta

== See also ==
- List of schools in Victoria
- List of high schools in Victoria
