= Mentone =

Mentone may refer to:

== Places ==
- Mentone, Victoria, Australia
- Mentone Beach, Port Phillip Bay, Victoria, Australia
- Electoral district of Mentone, Victoria, Australia
- Menton, France; sometimes known by its Italian name Mentone

=== United States ===
- Mentone, Alabama
- Mentone, California
- Mentone, Indiana
- Mentone, Texas

== Schools ==
- Mentone Grammar School, Mentone, Melbourne, Victoria, Australia
- Mentone Girls' Grammar School, Mentone, Melbourne, Victoria, Australia
- Mentone Girls' Secondary College, Mentone, Melbourne, Victoria, Australia

== Other uses ==
- Mentone Productions, U.S. film company
- Mentone railway station, Mentone, Melbourne, Victoria, Australia
