= Lists of schools in Australia =

Below is a list of lists of schools in Australia:

== New South Wales ==
- List of schools in Greater Western Sydney
- List of schools in the Hunter and Central Coast
- List of schools in Illawarra and the South East
- List of schools in the Northern Rivers and Mid North Coast
- List of schools in the Riverina
- List of schools in Tamworth
- List of government schools in New South Wales
  - List of selective high schools in New South Wales
- List of non-government schools in New South Wales
  - List of Catholic schools in New South Wales
  - List of Anglican schools in New South Wales
  - List of Islamic schools in New South Wales

== Queensland ==
- List of schools in Greater Brisbane
- List of schools in Gold Coast, Queensland
- List of schools in Sunshine Coast, Queensland
- List of schools in West Moreton
- List of schools in Darling Downs
- List of schools in Wide Bay–Burnett
- List of schools in Central Queensland
- List of schools in North Queensland
- List of schools in Far North Queensland

== Other states and territories ==
- List of schools in the Australian Capital Territory
- List of schools in Australia's External Territories
- List of schools in the Northern Territory
- List of schools in South Australia
- List of schools in Tasmania
- List of schools in Victoria, Australia
  - List of government schools in Victoria
  - List of non-government schools in Victoria
- List of schools in rural Western Australia
  - List of schools in the Perth metropolitan area

== By type ==
- List of government schools in Australia
- List of non-government schools in Australia
  - List of religious schools in Australia
    - List of Christian schools in Australia
      - List of Adventist schools in Australia
      - List of Anglican schools in Australia
      - List of Baptist schools in Australia
      - List of Catholic schools in Australia
      - List of Eastern Orthodox schools in Australia
      - List of Lutheran schools in Australia
      - List of Methodist schools in Australia
      - List of non-denominational Christian schools in Australia
      - List of Presbyterian schools in Australia
      - List of Uniting Church schools in Australia
    - List of Islamic schools in Australia
    - List of Jewish schools in Australia
  - List of non-religious non-government schools in Australia
    - List of Montessori schools in Australia
    - List of Steiner schools in Australia
- List of boarding schools in Australia
- List of girls' schools in Australia
- List of boys' schools in Australia

== See also ==
- Education in Australia
- List of universities in Australia
- List of boarding schools in Australia
