= St Ursula's College =

St Ursula's College or Saint Ursula's College may refer to the following schools in Australia:

- Saint Ursula's College, Kingsgrove, Sydney, New South Wales
- St Ursula's College, Toowoomba, Queensland
- St Ursula's College, Yeppoon, Queensland
