= Bronwyn Kidd =

Australian woman fashion, portrait and fine art photographer

Bronwyn Kidd (born 1969) is an Australian photographer known for fashion and portraiture.

== Early life ==
Bronwyn Kidd was born in Melbourne in 1969 to Robert Kidd, a butcher, and Barbara Kidd (née Wilson). She undertook her upper-secondary education at Ivanhoe Girls' Grammar School 1983–1986, where, using her father's Pentax ME II Super, her interest in photography began. Moving up to a Canon F1 at RMIT University she undertook a Bachelor of Arts 1987–1989. There, lecturer Alex Syndikas introduced her to the work of Sarah Moon and she discovered Cecil Beaton, Norman Parkinson and Athol Shmith, all of whose works were an influence on her.

== Career ==
=== Fashion ===
Eager to begin a career, Kidd left art school early, and she took work as an assistant to local fashion photographers. She soon moved to the United Kingdom, in 1992, where she worked with fellow Australian Polly Borland and fashion photographer Clive Arrowsmith. At barely 23 years of age she was taken on by the Queen's couturier Sir Hardy Amies to shoot exclusively for his Savile Row seasonal collections and advertising. For these, she started to use a medium-format Rollei and hired famed British model Paula Hamilton. Kidd has expressed her angle on fashion as an admiration of beauty rather than mere 'sexiness'. The magazines in which her fashion photography was published include Harper's Bazaar, Queen, Tatler, Marie Claire UK, Sainsbury's Magazine, Day Four, Wedding and Home Magazine, The London Magazine, and The Saturday Times.

=== Portraitist ===
Since 1988 a number of her portraits of fashion designers, including Bella Freud, Bruce Oldfield (OBE), Caroline Charles and shoe designer Jimmy Choo have been on exhibition at, and are held in, the National Portrait Gallery, London. Her portrait of John Cleese appeared on the cover of the BBC publication The Human Face. Of portraiture, Kidd has said;

"I have had wondrous conversations with people that I may never have met in my lifetime, let alone had dialogue with if I did not have a camera in my hand. The camera serves in many ways as a rite of passage, a privilege, an invitation."

=== Return to Australia ===
In 2004, Kidd moved back to Australia where she concentrated on advertising and fashion, but also continued her portraiture, depicting important Australian icons; actress Teresa Palmer, and photographer Bill Henson. Her portraits began to feature prominently in the national press, and subjects include Judge Betty King, Vicki Roach, Philip Lynch, Kate Ceberano, Rob Story, Fiona Smith, Kon Karapanagiotidis, Maxine Morand, Daniel Andrews, Helen Silver, Rod Eddington, Lindsay Tanner, Greg Hunt, Bernie Finn, Gideon Obarzanek, Carole Francis, and artists Bill Henson, Sam Leach and Gareth Samson.

In 2016 she co-created, with long-time collaborator the creative director Virginia Dowzer, the image used to promote the National Gallery of Victoria’s 200 Years of Australian Fashion exhibition. For the Bendigo Art Gallery in 2020 Kidd expanded on her fashion-art crossover by co-creating with Dowzer the primary campaign image for the Gallery’s landmark traveling exhibition, Piinpi: Contemporary Indigenous Fashion.

Andy Dinan, director of MARS Gallery, described her portraits as contemporary but with "a wistfulness for the golden age of fashion photography" and in a statement quoted by Emma Pham in Art Collector said: “Bronwyn‘s photographs convey a sense of fluidity, beauty and timelessness. They testify to a contemporary vision which resonates today, making her one of Australia’s most exciting contemporary photographers.”

Kidd refined her aesthetics and techniques and extended her collaborative approach with her sitters in portraits produced in the 2020s. Such portraits of Maudie Palmer (2022) were prominently referenced in obituaries and tributes to the Australian curator/director. Subjects also include Australian artists Yvette Coppersmith (2022 and 2026), Rosslynd Piggott and Polly Borland. The latter work, for which she blended digital and analogue darkroom techniques, won Kidd the 2025 Martin Kantor Portrait Prize in the Ballarat International Foto Biennale, judged by Natasha Bullock, Senior Curator, National Gallery of Victoria; Alexander Robinson, Director, Photoaccess and Stephen Payne, BIFB Creative Activation Producer.

=== Fine artist ===
In the 2020s Kidd turned from the commercial world and devoted her attention to collaborative fine art projects from which, every year, she has produced solo exhibitions, contributed to group exhibitions, and participated successfully in major awards. She was represented by MARS Gallery, Melbourne, and Flinders Lane Gallery, has exhibited at the Ballarat International Foto Biennale and at Frankston and Montsalvat arts centres. The journal Art Collector describes how her series Through Her Breath "celebrates ancestral breath, placing women, whose bodies are the source of our first breaths, as the inscribers of embodied legacies of past and present."

Kidd works with artists from other disciplines, drawing them into a democratic and feminist collaboration on elaborate projects. Of Sea Lion Sisters from which a selection was exhibited alongside her series Ice Queens (2023) at Satellite Projects, Collingwood, curator Jenny Port wrote: "Kidd’s series Sea Lion Sisters (2024)...explores intimacy, resilience, and kinship between women. Drawing on the protective movements of sea lion mothers, the project unfolds within a luminous set evoking mother-of-pearl, a symbolic feminine space of shelter and creation." Andrea Louise Thomas of Frankston Arts Centre notes the collaboration between Kidd, the choreographer Carol Brown, costume designer Virginia Dowser, paper artist Amanda May for the set, and with the dancers:

The dancers explored how they could move in the costumes. Bronwyn then thought of putting the dancers on a revolving set inside the cove like an animated diorama. The dancers moved fluidly like two sea lions in rippling sea kelp. Blending digital and analogue photography techniques, Bronwyn came up with a series of twelve dynamic, striking images celebrating the female spirit through dance.

== Selected awards ==
- 2009: AIPP Celebrating Women in Photography
- 2009: Mobius Advertising Awards
- 2021: Finalist, Olive Cotton Award, Tweed Regional Gallery, NSW
- 2024: Finalist, Fisher's Ghost Art Award, Campbelltown Arts Centre, Sydney
- 2024: Finalist, Exploration 24, Flinders Lane Gallery, Melbourne
- 2025: Winner, Martin Kantor Portrait Prize, Ballarat International Foto Biennale

== Exhibitions ==
=== Solo ===
- 2008: Strip Jack Naked, B.Kidd & V.Dowzer, Format Furniture, Melbourne
- 2009: 59.5 (A.K.A. 100 Great Outfits), B.Kidd & V.Dowzer, Cose Impanema, Melbourne
- 2020, to 20 September: #STYLE, Frankston Arts Centre
- 2023: Through Her Breath, MARS Gallery, Melbourne
- 2023: Through Her Breath, Open Program Ballarat International Foto Biennale
- 2024: Through Her Breath, Montsalvat Arts Centre, Melbourne
- 2025: Sea Lion Sisters, Frankston Arts Centre

=== Group ===
- 1998: National Portrait Gallery, London.
- 2006: National Portrait Gallery, London. Chinese Connections
- 2008: Strip Jack Naked, Bronwyn Kidd & Virginia Dowzer, Format Furniture, Flinders Lane, Melbourne
- 2008: William and Winifred Bowness Prize, Monash Gallery of Art, Melbourne.
- 2009: 59.5 (Aka 100 Great Outfits), Melbourne, Cose Impanema - Collins Street, Melbourne
- 2011, 25 May–10 June: Celebrating Woman in Photography. HeadOn Photo Festival, Art Est. Gallery Studio 4, Leichhardt
- 2016, 5 March–31 July: 200 Years of Australian Fashion, National Gallery of Victoria
- 2019, 22 September–30 November: Homage to Style, Living Arts Space, Bendigo
- 2020, August: Frankston Art Space
- 2021, 16 July - 19 September: 2019 Olive Cotton Award for Photographic Portraiture. Tweed Regional Gallery
- 2023/24, 10 December–11 February: 33rd Linden Postcard Show. Linden New Art, St Kilda
- 2024, 22 June–5 July: Fifty Squared Art Prize Exhibition. Brunswick Street Gallery, Fitzroy
- 2024: Exploration 24, Flinders Lane Gallery, Melbourne
- 2025, 6–28 September: Current Lander-Se, Red Hill, Victoria
- 2025, 1–23 November: Ember. Lander-Se, Red Hill, Victoria
- 2025: Identity: Quiet Acts. Satellite Projects
- 2026, 6–28 September: Current. Amy Leeworthy, Astrid Salomon, Britt Neech, Bronwyn Kidd, Kate Sartori and Leyla Bulmer. Lander-Se, Red Hill, Victoria

== Collections ==
- Hardy Amies
- National Portrait Gallery, London

== Works ==
=== Publications about Bronwyn Kidd ===
- Di Trocchio, Paola; Buick, Nadia; Maynard, Margaret; Whitfield, Danielle; National Gallery of Victoria (2016), 200 years of Australian fashion (Limited ed.), Council of Trustees, National Gallery of Victoria, ISBN 978-1-925432-06-0
- Professional Photographer, Collectors Edition 2010, ‘300 Secrets to success’ page 59.
- British Journal of Photography, 18.11.98, ‘Printers present’ page 17.

=== Publications of photographs ===
- Atwood, Margaret (1993), Good bones, Virago, ISBN 978-1-85381-615-4
- Margaret Atwood (1993), The robber bride, New York Nan A. Talese/Doubleday, ISBN 978-0-385-47216-6
- Bates, Brian; Cleese, John; British Broadcasting Corporation (2001), The human face, BBC, ISBN 978-0-563-55188-1
- National Safety Council (2001), Pediatric first aid (4th ed.), Jones and Bartlett Publishers, ISBN 978-0-7637-1336-2
- Unger, John M; Hendricks, Kathleen; Schoen, Kathy (2002), Between you and your child : Catholic values of human sexuality for your family, Sadlier, ISBN 978-0-8215-5770-9
- Cox, Harold (July 2003), Aging (16th ed.), McGraw-Hill/Dushkin (published 2004), ISBN 978-0-07-284557-0
- Bunting, Susan J (2005), Human sexuality 05/06 (29th ed.), McGraw-Hill/Dushkin, ISBN 978-0-07-291733-8
- Pascarl, Jacqueline (2007), Since I was a princess, HarperCollinsPublishers Australia, ISBN 978-0-7322-8322-3
- Westlake, Lisa; Kidd, Bronwyn (2012), Mums shape up, Hachette Australia, ISBN 978-0-7336-2835-1
- National Portrait Gallery (Great Britain); Keaney, Magdalene, (writer of introduction.); National Portrait Gallery (Great Britain), (issuing body.) (5 September 2019), 100 fashion icons, National Portrait Gallery (published 2019), ISBN 978-1-85514-737-9

=== Selected editorial ===
- Fashion Trend Magazine Australia. Issue 31.
- ‘Dynasty’ Cover, pages, Fashion Trend Magazine Australia. Issue 23.
- ‘Queen’ Cover, pages 66–77 Inclusive. Fashion Trend Magazine Australia. Issue 15, ISSN 1832-6811.
- ‘Envy’ Cover, pages 102–111. Who Magazine, Dec.9, 2013. ISSN 1832-6811
- Dave Hughes and Kate Langbroek, pages 48–49. Who Magazine, 26 June 2006.

=== Advertising campaigns ===
- Victorian Racing Club 2015, Playground of Racing Royalty, with Grey Advertising.
- Melbourne Writers Festival: Where Stories Meet. Agency: J.Walter Thompson Melbourne.
- L’Oréal
- Olay
