= CGGS =

CGGS can refer to:

- Calday Grange Grammar School
- Canberra Girls' Grammar School
- Camberwell Girls Grammar School
