= Santa Maria College =

Santa Maria College may refer to:

- Santa Maria College, Melbourne
- Santa Maria College, Perth
