= Susan Alberti =

Australian businesswoman (born 1947)

Susan "Sue" Alberti AC
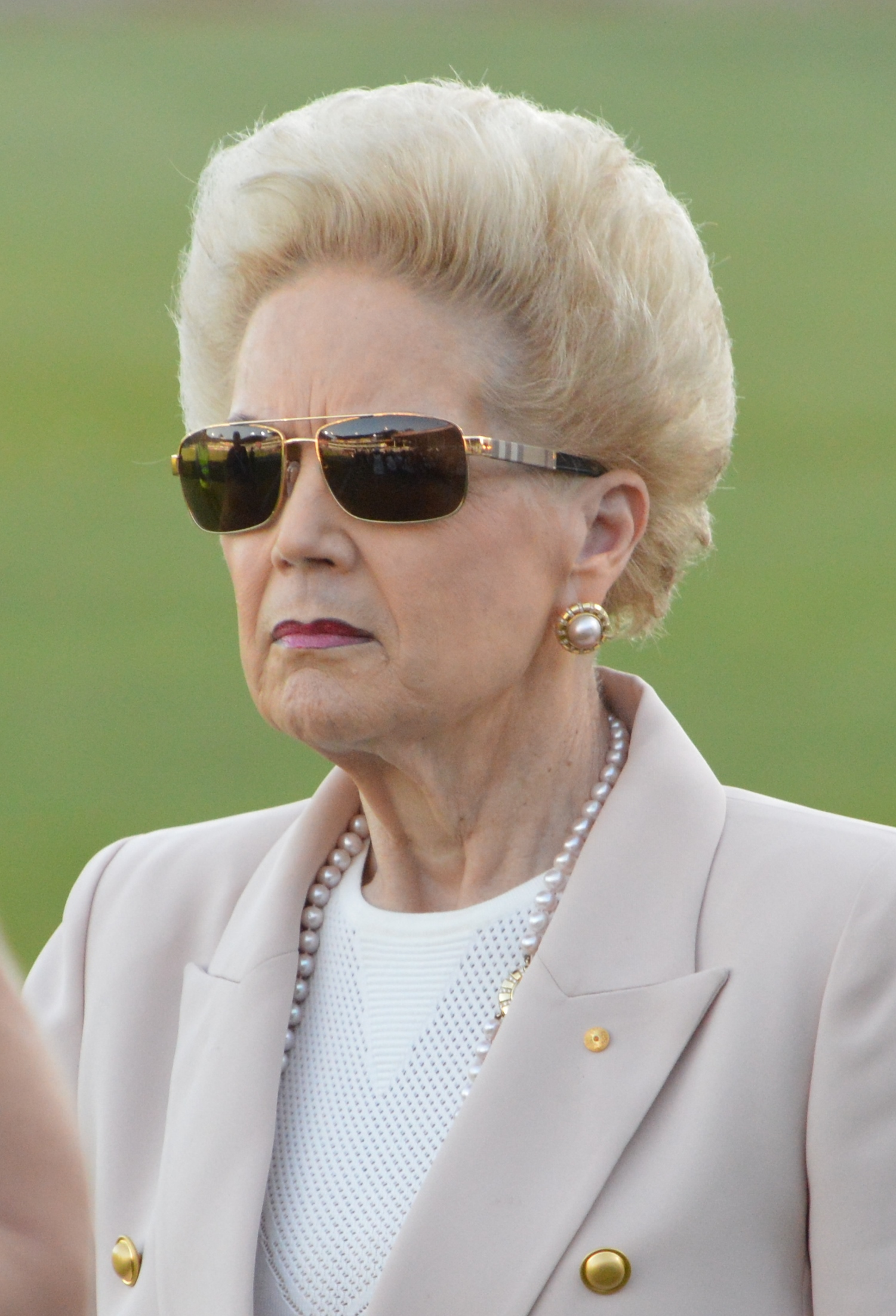
- Born: Susan Jenkings; 18 May 1947 (age 79); Bairnsdale, Victoria, Australia
- Occupation: Businesswoman
- Known for: Vice President of the Western Bulldogs Football Club; Leadership of the Juvenile Diabetes Research Foundation
- Spouses: Angelo Alberti (dec'd); Colin North (dec'd)

Susan Marie "Sue" Alberti AC (born 18 May 1947) is an Australian businesswoman, philanthropist and former Vice President of the Western Bulldogs Football Club.

== Life and career ==
Alberti was born in 1947 in Bairnsdale, Victoria, Australia. Her family moved to Ashwood in Melbourne, and she attended Siena College in nearby Camberwell for high school. She is the co-founder and managing director of the DANSU Group based in Wheelers Hill in Melbourne's east. Approximately forty years ago, Alberti and her late husband Angelo established the company as an industrial and commercial builder and developer of industrial estates and business parks.

Alberti has supplemented her successful business career with a major contribution and commitment to fundraising and promotion of juvenile diabetes research. She was National President of the Juvenile Diabetes Research Foundation Australia. In 1994 she founded the Melbourne and Sydney annual "Walk for the Cure" around Albert Park Lake, a significant annual fundraiser which to date has raised more than $30 million toward the search for a cure for diabetes. It is now held in every state and in regional areas around Australia. In 1995 Alberti was invited to join the International Board of the Juvenile Diabetes Research Foundation International (JDFI) and in 2008 accepted an invitation to become JDRFI's International Patron. In November 2013, she retired from all positions associated with JDRF Australia and JDRI stating that "it has become apparent that the organisation I joined 30 years ago and have championed ever since is heading in a direction that I cannot support".

In 2004 Alberti became a board member of the Western Bulldogs Football Club. Since 2003 Alberti has been the Patron of the Western Bulldogs football club and was the founding Co-chair of the Western Bulldogs Forever Foundation. In December 2012 she became Vice President of the Club and was re-elected to the Board in December 2013. Following the Western Bulldogs Football Club's 2016 premiership Susan Alberti announced she would be stepping down as vice president of the club. She was appointed the inaugural ambassador for the Australian Football League's national women's competition in 2017.

After her first husband Angelo died in 1996, she married Colin North in 2006. After a short battle with cancer, North died in 2022.

Alberti's leadership and support for women in sport, in particular Australian rules football, was one of the key reasons behind the establishment of an elite AFL Women's competition in 2017.

She is Patron of the Prime Ministers' Sporting Oration (PMSO) – a leadership initiative highlighted by a speech delivered by a former occupant of Australia's highest office. The inaugural PMSO was delivered by Julia Gillard, Australia's 27th Prime Minister, at the Melbourne Convention and Exhibition Centre on 21 November.

In June 2019 Alberti became a Victoria Day Council Trustee. She was re-appointed to the Australian Charities and Not-for-profits Commission Advisory Board for a further three years in July 2020.

In March 2020 Alberti was named by the Herald Sun as one of the top 20 most influential women in sport for 2020. In October 2020 she was named as one of the 30 most influential Victorians from the last 30 years.

Alberti is Chair of the Susan Alberti Medical Research Foundation and the Victoria University Foundation and is a Director at the Western Health and Western Bulldogs Forever Foundations.

She continues to support Victoria University where the inaugural Susan Alberti Women in Sport Chair was established in 2018 with VU's Professor Clare Hanlon taking the inaugural position.

In May 2022, Alberti became the inaugural Chair of the Australian Centre for Accelerating Diabetes Innovations Council.

== Honours and awards ==
Alberti was a state finalist in the senior division of the Australian of the Year Award in 2009. In 1997 she was appointed a Member of the Order of Australia for her contribution towards the cause of diabetes research; and in 2007 was appointed an Officer of the Order of Australia in recognition of her long and outstanding contribution to major medical research institutions, particularly as a philanthropist, fundraiser and advocate for juvenile diabetes care and research.

Alberti was appointed a Companion of the Order of Australia on 26 January 2016 for 'eminent service to the community, particularly through philanthropic and fundraising support for a range of medical research, education and sporting organisations, as an advocate for improved health care services for the disadvantaged, and to young women as a role model and mentor'.

In 2012, Alberti won the Humanitarian Award at the 5th Annual Gold Harold Awards which are designed to honour achievements made by leading Australian individuals and organisations that have contributed to the health and wellbeing of Australia's children and young people.

Alberti is also an outstanding supporter of the Victorian Women's Football League and the VWFL Premier Division Cup is named the Susan Alberti Cup in her honour. She was awarded life membership of the Western Bulldogs Football Club in 2015 and is also the President of the Footscray Football Club VFL team.

In 2013, Alberti was a recipient of Research Australia's Great Australian Philanthropy Award. The following year she was elected as Chair of Victoria University's Foundation.

In 2014, she was also inducted into the Victorian Honour Roll of Women.

In August 2015, Alberti was appointed a Director of the Australia Day Council by the Prime Minister, Tony Abbott.

Alberti was awarded Melburnian of the Year in November 2017.

In December 2017, Alberti was presented the Award for Leadership at the Australian Institute of Sport Awards.

She was named Victorian of the Year in 2018 and was also listed as one of the Australian Financial Review's top 100 women of influence.
