= Kilvington Grammar School =

Baptist coeducational school in Melbourne, Australia

Location
- Ormond, Victoria; Australia; 37°53′57″S 145°2′29″E

Information
- Type: private, co-educational, Christian day school
- Motto: Latin: Non Nobis Sed Omnibus (Not for our own but others' good)
- Denomination: Baptist
- Established: 1923; 103 years ago
- Founder: Caroline & Constance Barrett
- Chairperson: Richard Moore
- Principal: Rob French
- Chaplain: Rev. Janet Woodlock
- Gender: Co-educational
- Enrolment: 830 (ELC–12)
- Houses: Barrett; Burman; Fysh; Fethers
- Colours: Navy-blue; Magenta; White; Gold
- Affiliation: Eastern Independent Schools of Melbourne
- Website: kilvington.vic.edu.au

Kilvington Grammar School (previously named Ormond Girls' School, Kilvington Baptist Girls' Grammar School and Kilvington Girls Grammar) is a private, Baptist, co-educational day school, located in Ormond, a suburb in the Glen Eira region of Melbourne, Victoria, Australia.

Established in 1923 by Caroline and Constance Barrett, Kilvington has a non-selective enrolment policy and currently caters for approximately 800 students from the Early Learning Centre to Year 12.

The school is affiliated with the Junior School Heads Association of Australia, the Association of Independent Schools of Victoria, the Association of Heads of Independent Schools of Australia, and was a founding member of Girls Sport Victoria.

== Principals ==
Kilvington Grammar School has had ten principals or formerly headmistresses since the school was established in 1923.

Years served	Name
1923–1933	Caroline Barrett
1934–1943	Florence Muriel Fysh
1944–1948	Mabel Ross
1949–1973	Roberta McKie
1974–1993	Warren Stone
1993–2001	Di Fleming AM
2002–2005	Judith Potter
2006–2007	Dan McNeill
2008–2021	Jon Charlton
2022–present	Rob French

== Curriculum ==
Kilvington Grammar School offers their Year 11 and 12 students the Victorian Certificate of Education.

== Controversy ==
=== Death of Lachlan Cook ===
Kilvington Grammar School has been deeply criticized following the death of 16-year-old student Lachlan Cook, who died due to complications from Type 1 diabetes during a school trip to Vietnam in 2019. Despite being aware of Lachlan's medical condition, the school and World Challenge Expeditions, the company organizing the trip, failed to provide adequate care and support, leading to his tragic and preventable death. During the trip, Lachlan consumed street food in Vietnam, which led to severe diabetic ketoacidosis. Despite exhibiting serious symptoms, including persistent vomiting and high blood glucose levels, Lachlan was not taken to a hospital for over 24 hours. His condition rapidly deteriorated, and after suffering a cardiac arrest, he was declared brain-dead upon his return to Melbourne.

The coroner's inquest found significant failures in how the situation was managed. The supervising staff, including two Kilvington teachers, were not trained to handle diabetes-related emergencies, nor were they provided with Lachlan's diabetes management plan. This lack of preparedness was a critical factor in the coroner's determination that Lachlan's death was preventable. WorkSafe Victoria subsequently charged Kilvington Grammar School under the Occupational Health and Safety Act for failing to ensure the safety of students, particularly those with known medical conditions.

In July 2024, Kilvington Grammar School pleaded guilty to charges of failing to ensure the safety of Lachlan Cook during a 2019 school trip to Vietnam. This legal admission followed significant public scrutiny and legal pressure over the years. The school acknowledged its failure to protect Lachlan, who died as a result of complications from Type 1 diabetes during the trip. In a statement, Kilvington Grammar School principal Rob French confirmed that the school had pleaded guilty to a breach of the Occupational Health and Safety Act. He stated, "As the matter is still before the courts, I am unable to comment further at this stage, other than to say my thoughts and prayers remain with Lachie's family and friends, who continue to mourn his tragic loss." Kilvington Grammar School is scheduled to appear in the County Court for a presentence hearing on December 11, 2024.

The company that organized the trip, World Challenge Expeditions Pty Ltd, faces three similar charges. In court, they requested additional time to review the case and are due to return on September 20, 2024.

== Notable alumni ==
- Julia Banks – Federal Member of Parliament for Chisholm, elected 2016
- Christine Forster AM – Director of VicSuper Pty Ltd; Deputy chairman of the Victorian Water Trust Advisory Council; Named on the Victorian Honour Roll of Women 2004; Recipient of the Centenary Medal 2003
- Linda Hanel – Champion Butterfly Swimmer, two time world record holder (1978 Commonwealth Games and 1976 Summer Olympics)
- Jayashri Kulkarni AM – Monash University Professor & Head of Department, President of International Association for Women's Mental Health 2017–2019.

== See also ==
- List of schools in Victoria
- Victorian Certificate of Education
