= Academy of Mary Immaculate =

Location
- Fitzroy, Victoria; Australia; 37°48′14.27″S 144°58′25.85″E

Information
- Type: Independent, single-sex, day school
- Motto: Latin: Speculum Sine Macula (Mirror without Blemish); Live The Truth
- Denomination: Roman Catholic, Sisters of Mercy
- Established: 1857
- Principal: Mary Moloney RSM
- Enrolment: ~650 (7–12)
- Colours: Navy blue, yellow and white
- Slogan: It's our time (2018)
- Website: www.academy.vic.edu.au

The Academy of Mary Immaculate is a Catholic girls' secondary school, situated in Fitzroy, Victoria, Australia. It was founded by the Sisters of Mercy in 1857.

== Description ==
The Academy is the oldest secondary girls' school in Victoria. The Academy has achieved success in sport, speech, choir, concert band, debating and many other extra-curricular activities. It is located in the inner suburbs of Melbourne and is notable for the Sisters of Mercy convent located within the school grounds. The high school's four sport houses are Sherlock, McAuley, Goold and Frayne.

== Notable alumnae ==
- Anne Henderson – writer, deputy director of the Sydney Institute
- Alice Ross-King (1891–1968) – awarded the Florence Nightingale medal in 1949 by the International Red Cross for service in both World War I and World War II
- Mary Maguire – actress
- Abbey Lee Kershaw – supermodel
- Ged Kearney – Federal Member of Parliament for Cooper, former President ACTU

== See also ==
- List of schools in Victoria
- Victorian Certificate of Education
