= Siena College (Camberwell) =

Location
- Camberwell, Victoria; Australia; 37.8333°S 145.0826°E

Information
- Type: Catholic, day school
- Motto: Latin: Veritas (Truth)
- Denomination: Roman Catholic (Dominicans)
- Established: 1940; 86 years ago
- Principal: Elizabeth Hanney
- Years: 1-1
- Gender: Girls
- Enrollment: ~710
- Colour
- Athletics: Girls Sport Victoria
- Website: www.siena.vic.edu.au

Siena College is a Roman Catholic secondary school for girls in Camberwell, a suburb of Melbourne, Australia. It was founded by the Dominican Sisters in 1940. It is a member of Girls Sport Victoria and the Alliance of Girls' Schools Australasia.

== Sport ==
Siena is a member of Girls Sport Victoria (GSV).

=== GSV premierships ===
Siena has won the following GSV premierships.

- Basketball (5) – 2011, 2012, 2013, 2014, 2016
- Indoor Cricket (3) – 2012, 2018, 2019
- Soccer – 2013

== Notable alumnae ==
- Susan Alberti AO, philanthropist and businesswoman
- Sonya Hartnett, author/novelist
- Angela Savage, author
- Magda Szubanski, (born 1961), actress and comedian
- Michele Timms (born 1965), athlete and basketball coach
- Emelia Jackson (born 1989), pastrycook and reality television contestant

== See also ==
- Santa Sabina College

== External ==
- School Website
- Profile at The Good Schools Guide
