= St Margaret's Berwick Grammar School =

Location
- Berwick, Victoria; Australia
- 38°2′6″S 145°20′54″E

Information
- Type: Independent, day school
- Motto: Latin: Virtute Et Labore (By Valour and Exertion)
- Denomination: Non-denominational
- Established: 1926
- Chairman: Fiona Templar
- Principal: Annette Rome
- Years offered: K–12
- Gender: Co-educational (K–6 and 11–12); Girls (7–10); Boys (7–10)
- Enrolment: ~824 (K–12)
- Colours: Navy, red, and gold
- School fees: A$16,075 (Pre-Prep) – $29,405 (Yr 12)
- Affiliation: Girls Sport Victoria
- Website: www.stmargarets.vic.edu.au

St Margaret's Berwick Grammar School is an independent, non-denominational day school with a co-educational primary school and senior secondary school, an all girls and an all boys junior secondary school. The school is located in Berwick, a suburb of Melbourne, Victoria, Australia.

== History ==
St Margaret's School was established in 1926 with 18 pupils, as an affiliate of the Presbyterian church, in the manse of the Toorak Presbyterian Church. In 1927 St Margaret's School moved to Mayfield Avenue, Malvern, and in 1931 leased the former Governor's residence, Stonington. By the 1930s St Margaret's School had grown to 330 pupils. In 1929 the Berwick Presbyterian Girls’ School was purchased. This branch of the main School was established in 1930, with a purpose-built boarding house, Campbell House.

The school was originally owned by its principal, Dora Gipson, until 1947 when she sold it to the parents and Old Girls as she needed to retire due to illness.

St Margaret's School was incorporated in 1948 and the first Council established.

It operated as a "rural boarding school" and was run as such until 1978.

In 2006, St Margaret's School Council announced its decision to establish a brother school for St Margaret's. This school opened in 2009 named Berwick Grammar School, catered for boys in Years 7 to 12.

In 2021 the two schools were formally brought together under the new name St Margaret's Berwick Grammar.

== Description ==
The St Margaret's School campus is in Berwick and the boys' campus is in Officer.

The school has a non-selective enrollment policy. As of December 2024 there were 876 students from Pre-Prep to Year 12, 535 girls and 341 boys. Around 69 per cent of the student cohort has a home language other than English.

Fees are A$16,075 (Pre-Prep) – $29,405 (Yr 12)

== Sport ==
St Margaret's Berwick Grammar is a member of Girls Sport Victoria (GSV) and Southern Independent Schools (SIS).

=== GSV premierships ===
St Margaret's Berwick Grammar has won the following GSV premierships.

- Cricket – 2013
- Netball – 2001
- Softball (3) – 2014, 2018, 2019
- Tennis – 2014
- Volleyball – 2018

=== SIS premierships ===
St Margaret's Berwick Grammar has won the following SIS senior premierships.

- Basketball (4) – 2014, 2015, 2017, 2019
- Soccer – 2016

== Staff ==
Staff	Name
President, School Council	Fiona Templar
Principal	Annette Rome
Performing Arts Administration	Kim Sanders

== Notable alumnae ==
- Jennifer Byrne – journalist, broadcaster, TV presenter (both ABC and commercial), former book publisher
- Rosalie Ham – novelist; author of The Dressmaker (2000)
- Alison Lester – author and illustrator of children's books and young adult novels
- Sue Maslin – film producer; produced the film The Dressmaker (2015)
- Breann Moody – AFLW footballer for Carlton Football Club
- Celine Moody – AFLW footballer for Carlton Football Club
- Janette Robyn Heather McMaster – former Executive Director of the Committee for Economic Development of Australia
- Laetisha Scanlan – Australian athlete, sport shooting and gold medallist at the 2014 and 2018 Commonwealth Games

== See also ==
- List of schools in Victoria
- List of high schools in Victoria
- Victorian Certificate of Education
