= Rosslynd Piggott =

Australian artist (born 1958)

- Born: 1958 (age 67–68)
- Education: University of Melbourne
- Known for: painting, installation
- Style: symbolist, surrealist

Rosslynd Piggott (born 1958) is a contemporary Australian installation artist and painter. Piggott's foundations for art making are in painting but have evolved to include drawing, photography, textiles, video, installation and sculpture throughout her career. Piggott's art includes symbolist and surrealist themes where "she explores a dream-like state, where the process is open-ended – part of a continuum – and the notion of the uncanny is a constant companion."

== Early life ==
Rosslynd Piggott was born in Frankston, Victoria, and educated at the University of Melbourne from 1977 to 1980. Piggott completed a year of teaching in Werrimull in regional Victoria in 1981 and in the following year, returned to St. Kilda to begin her career as an artist.

== Career ==
Piggott has exhibited in over 60 important solo exhibitions and numerous curated events both nationally and internationally, including a retrospective titled Rosslynd Piggott: Suspended Breath at the National Gallery of Victoria, Melbourne (1998), the Kitamoto Cultural Centre, Saitama, Japan (1997), the Mori Gallery, Sydney (1997), ARCO O2 in Madrid, the 1999 Liverpool Biennial, and most recently at the National Gallery of Victoria again in 2019 for her second retrospective exhibition titled I Sense You But I Cannot See You, which included many of Piggott's artworks retrieved from the NGV collection.

She received the St. Kilda Council acquisitive price in 1986, the Sara Weis Nude award in 1992 and grants from Visual Arts/Craft Board of Australia Council in 1990 and 1997.

Piggott is represented by Sutton Gallery, Melbourne and Milani Gallery, Brisbane in Australia, and Gallery 360 Degrees, Tokyo in Japan.
