= Korowa Anglican Girls' School =

Location
- Glen Iris, Victoria; Australia; 37°51′41″S 145°3′16″E

Information
- Type: Private, single-sex day school
- Motto: Latin: Non Sine Palma Pulvere (No Reward Without Effort)
- Denomination: Anglican
- Established: 1890
- Founder: Henrietta Akehurst
- Chair of Council: Jane Murray
- Principal: Frances Booth
- Chaplain: Rev. Kirsten Winkett
- Staff: 149
- Grades: Co-ed ELC 3 and 4 Year old. Girls: Prep - 12.
- Gender: Co-ed ELC. Girls Junior and Senior School.
- Enrolment: ~803 (2024)
- Houses: Akehurst, Clarke, Jamieson, Wilkinson
- Colours: Cherry
- Slogan: Girls who are authentic, confident and strong.
- Affiliation: Girls Sport Victoria
- Alumni name: Korovians
- Website: www.korowa.vic.edu.au

Korowa Anglican Girls' School is a private, Anglican, day school, located in Glen Iris, Melbourne, Australia.

Established in Malvern in 1890, Korowa is a non-selective school and currently caters for approximately 800 students, offering a co-educational Early Learning Centre (three- and four-year-olds) and girls-only from Prep to Year 12. The school prepares students for the Victorian Certificate of Education (VCE).

The school is a member of the Association of Heads of Independent Schools of Australia (AHISA), the Independent Primary School Heads of Australia (IPHSA), the Association of Independent Schools of Victoria (AISV), the Alliance of Girls' Schools Australasia (AGSA), and a founding member of Girls Sport Victoria (GSV).

== History ==
Korowa Anglican Girls' School was established in 1890, first in two houses in Valetta Street, Malvern and then in an old house in Pine Grove. In 1900, the school moved again, this time to a two-storey house in Wattletree Road. The school was registered as "School No.5" in 1906.

Korowa relocated to its current site in Glen Iris in 1914. The residence was the former property of the Hon. William Knox, MHR, who named the home "Ranfurlie", which is now reflected in the name of the crescent in which the school is located. The school was officially named "Corowa" in 1899, but later changed to Korowa to avoid confusion with the township of Corowa in 1890.

From 1910 to 1918, Korowa was a Presbyterian school for girls', then in 1919 was incorporated by the diocesan authorities as a Church of England grammar school. When the Diocese of Melbourne adopted the title "Anglican" instead of Church of England in 1982, it was decided that the church connection should be retained in the name, and the school has since been known as "Korowa Anglican Girls' School".

== Principals ==
An old Korowa emblem

Period	Principal
1899–1905	Henrietta Akehurst
1906–1926	Ethel Akehurst
1927–1929	Enid Eastman
1930–1949	Margaret Dickson
1950–1969	Beatrice Guyett MBE (c)
1970–1990	Margaret McPherson
1991–2003	Roslyn Otzen
2003–2015	Christine Jenkins
2016–2021	Helen Carmody
2022	Narelle Umbers (interim)
2022–present	Frances Booth

== House system ==
House	Year established	Named for	Colour
Akehurst	1933	Miss Ethel Akehurst (former principal and daughter of founder)	Grey
Clarke	1924	Dr Lowther Clarke (former Archbishop of Melbourne, responsible for the inauguration of Korowa as a Church of England Grammar School)	Pink
Jamieson	1924	Miss Jean Jamieson MA (former Senior Mistress of staff)	Blue
Wilkinson	1924	Miss Wanda Wilkinson (former Head Prefect and former member of staff)	Cherry

== Notable alumnae ==
All Korowa alumnae are members of the school's alumni association, the 'Korovian Club'. Korowa alumni number over 12000 members and every past student is automatically a lifetime member of the Korovian Club. The Korovian Club was founded in 1917 with the purpose of maintaining friendships and a connection with the school.

Some notable 'Korovians' include:

- Eva Duldig, Tennis Player; played in Wimbledon, the Maccabiah Games, and in Fed Cup for Australia
- Kerrie Engel, Paralympic Swimmer
- Dorothy Gibson, Teacher, Communist, and Peace Activist
- Bella Heathcote, Actress
- Ann Liang, Author
- Hannah MacDougall, Paralympic swimming medalist
- Mary Owen, Activist
- Sally Peers, Wimbledon junior doubles champion 2009
- Marina Prior, Opera Singer
- Pauline Neura Reilly, Author and ornithologist
- Jenna Strauch, Swimmer and Olympian
- Rowena Webster, Water Polo Player
- Caroline Pitcher, CEO VicScreen
- Naomi Simson, Entrepreneur
- Pam Barnes, Television Producer
- Louise Siversen, Actress
- Eli Giannini, Architecture and Director
- Jaq Grantford, Artist and Writer
- Jessica Au, Author
- Caroline Brothers, Author

== Notable faculty ==
- Margaret Blackwood, botanist and geneticist
- Slawa Duldig (1901–1975), Austrian-Australian inventor, artist, interior designer, and teacher
- Norma Redpath, sculptor
- Jane Robinson, World Champion and Triple Olympian Rower
- Shelley O'Donnell, Australian Netball Hall of Fame

== See also ==
- Anglican Church of Australia
- Victorian Certificate of Education
- List of schools in Victoria
