= Ivanhoe Girls' Grammar School =

Location
- Ivanhoe, Victoria; Australia; 37°45′58″S 145°2′49″E

Information
- Type: private, single-sex, day school
- Motto: Latin: Lux Mea Christus (Christ my light)
- Denomination: Anglican
- Established: 1903
- Principal: Narelle Umbers
- Years offered: ELC–12
- Gender: Girls
- Enrolment: ~1,025 (ELC–12)
- Colours: Royal blue, chocolate brown and white
- Affiliation: Girls Sport Victoria
- Website: www.ivanhoegirls.vic.edu.au

Ivanhoe Girls' Grammar School, is a private, Anglican, day school for girls, located in Ivanhoe, an eastern suburb of Melbourne, Victoria, Australia. Established in 1903, the school has a non-selective enrolment policy and currently caters for over 850 students from the Early Learning Centre (ELC) to Year 12.

Ivanhoe Girls' Grammar School is affiliated with the Association of Heads of Independent Schools of Australia (AHISA), the Junior School Heads Association of Australia (JSHAA), the Alliance of Girls' Schools Australasia (AGSA), the Association of Independent Schools of Victoria (AISV), and is a founding member of Girls Sport Victoria (GSV).

== Campus ==
Classes are held in a number of different buildings. There is a senior and junior library, and café, Arts and Hospitality Centre and many other facilities. The Performing Arts Centre, visible from Upper Heidelberg Road, is used frequently both for school performances and external performances (including the local Heidelberg Symphony Orchestra).

=== Student-driven philanthropy ===
Since 1998, the senior class has raised funds for a humanitarian organisation of their choice via a charity concert held each year. The year level are given four weeks to prepare this much anticipated event in the School's calendar. The Class of 2012 holds the current record of $67,500 AUD for BeyondWater. The class of 2011 raised $47,675 AUD for a small humanitarian organisation based in Melbourne- Front Yard Youth Services. The Class of 2008 raised $47,000.00 AUD for the Australian charity organisation Kids Under Cover. The Class of 2010 raised over $43,000 for The Alannah and Madeline Foundation.

== House system ==
As with most Australian schools, Ivanhoe Girls' Grammar School uses a house system. Students are divided into six houses, named after characters and places in Sir Walter Scott's Ivanhoe.

- Rotherwood (Blue)
- Locksley (White)
- Rowena (Yellow)
- Ashby (Red)
- Oswald (Green)
- York (Purple)

The school awards points to each house, based on house-wide achievements in a number of fields including sports and debating. Individuals can also earn points for their house for their own individual achievements. These points are cumulated at the end of the year, and the winning house is announced at the School's "Celebration Night".

== Notable alumni ==
- Cate Blanchett, actress/director
- Rovina Cai, illustrator
- Bronwyn Kidd, photographer
- Jenny Mikakos, Former Minister for Health; Member of the Legislative Council (ALP) for Northern Metropolitan Region; Former Victorian Parliamentary Secretary for Justice, and MLC (ALP) for Jika Jika Province (also attended Thornbury High School)
- Ilma Grace Stone, botanist
- Bridie Carter, actress
- Alicia Loxley, journalist

== Notable staff ==
- Matthew Bach
- Julian McGauran

== See also ==
- List of schools in Victoria
