= Beverly Hills Girls High School =

Location
- Broadarrow & King Georges Rds, New South Wales, Beverly Hills; 33°56′54″S 151°04′43″E

Information
- Former name: Hurstville Girls Secondary Classes (1958–1960)
- Type: Government-funded Comprehensive single-sex secondary day school
- Motto: Women Can Do Anything
- Established: 1958
- Authority: NSW Department of Education
- Oversight: NSW Education Standards Authority
- School code: 8255
- Principal: Maria Iemma
- Staff: c. 104 (2024)
- Teaching staff: c. 81 (2024)
- Years: 7–12
- Gender: Girls
- Enrolment: c. 1019 (2025)
- Website: beverlyhg-h.schools.nsw.gov.au

Beverly Hills Girls High School (abbreviated as BHGHS) is a comprehensive all-girls secondary school located at Beverly Hills, in Sydney, Australia.

Established in 1958, the school caters for approximately 1019 students from Year 7 to Year 12 and is operated by the New South Wales Department of Education. Beverly Hills Girls High School also hosts an English intensive centre.
