= List of schools in Australia's External Territories =

Australian Schools

This is a list of schools in Australia's External Territories, which consist of Norfolk Island, Christmas Island, the Cocos (Keeling) Islands, the Australian Antarctic Territory, the Coral Sea Islands, the Ashmore and Cartier Islands and Heard Island and McDonald Islands. The latter four have no permanent inhabitants, thus have no entries in this list.

== Schools ==
Name	External Territory	Educational Authority	Years	School type	Opened	Notes
Norfolk Island Central School	Norfolk Island	New South Wales	P-12	Government	1856	
Christmas Island District High School	Christmas Island	Western Australia	P-12	Government	1975	
Cocos Islands District High School	Cocos (Keeling) Islands	Western Australia	P-10	Government	1984	

== See also ==
- Education in Australia
- List of universities in Australia
- List of boarding schools in Australia
