= Mitcham Girls High School =

Coordinates: 34°58′12″S 138°36′35″E

- Kingswood, South Australia; Australia

Information
- Type: Public
- Established: 1964
- Principal: Rosie Heinicke
- Enrolment: 800
- Website: mitchagirlshs.sa.edu.au

Mitcham Girls High School, located in Kingswood, is the only unzoned, single-sex government high school in the state of South Australia. It has approximately 850 students in grades 7 to 13. As the school is unzoned, it attracts students from all across the Adelaide metropolitan area as well as some regional locations.

== History ==
Mitcham Girls High School was founded in 1964. The site was previously Kingswood High School from 1914 to 1917, and then from 1918 to 1963, it was a co-educational site incorporating nearby Unley High School before becoming a girls-only technical high school in 1964.

In 2015, 18% of students were from non-English-speaking backgrounds, as well as students from overseas studying under an international education program.

The school is a member of the Alliance of Girls' Schools Australasia. Since 1993, the school has regularly had teams participate in the World Solar Challenge.

== Facilities ==
The school has a 25m swimming pool and a performing arts centre.

== Notable alumni ==
- Nat Cook, Australian politician

== Notable staff ==
- Bianca Reddy, Australian netball player
- Mike Elliot, former politician
- Chloe Fox, former politician
