= Our Lady of Mercy College, Heidelberg =

Our Lady of Mercy College

Location
- Heidelberg, Victoria; Australia
- 37°45′32″S 145°4′1″E

Information
- Type: Independent, day school
- Motto: Duce Maria (With Mary as our Leader)
- Religious affiliation: Roman Catholic (Sisters of Mercy)
- Established: 1910
- Principal: Judith Weir
- Years offered: 7–12
- Gender: Girls
- Enrolment: ~1,090 (7–12)
- Colours: Blue & maroon
- School fees: $11,500 per year
- Affiliation: Girls Sport Victoria
- Website: www.olmcheidelberg.catholic.edu.au

Our Lady of Mercy College (OLMC), is a Roman Catholic, secondary day school for girls, situated in Heidelberg, a north-eastern suburb of Melbourne, Victoria, Australia.

The college is conducted by the Sisters of Mercy, a congregation of religious Sisters founded in Dublin, Ireland, by Catherine McAuley.

OLMC is a member of Girls Sport Victoria (GSV) and the Catholic All Schools Sports Association (CAS).

OLMC is split into four houses, Loreto, Carmel, Mercy and McAuley. These four houses compete in swimming, athletics, debating arts and maths competitions.

== Sport ==
OLMC is a member of Girls Sport Victoria (GSV).

=== GSV premierships ===
OLMC has won the following GSV premierships.

- Basketball (9) – 2004, 2006, 2008, 2010, 2013, 2014, 2016, 2017, 2018
- Netball (2) – 2003, 2004
- Soccer (3) – 2011, 2012, 2016
- Softball – 2016, 2024
- Tennis (2) – 2001, 2016
- Volleyball – 2005

== Notable alumnae ==
- Sarah Abo – journalist
- Susan Crennan – former justice of the High Court of Australia
- Alannah MacTiernan – former politician
- Emma Alberici – European correspondent for The 7.30 Report
- Denise Scott – comedian
- Alexandra Sharp – athlete
- Hanni (singer) - member of the South Korean girl group NewJeans

== See also ==
- List of schools in Victoria
- Victorian Certificate of Education
