= Toorak College, Mount Eliza =

Location
- Mount Eliza, Victoria; Australia; 38°10′20″S 145°5′35″E

Information
- Type: Independent, day and boarding
- Motto: Latin: In Labore Quies (In work lies rest)
- Denomination: Non-denominational
- Established: 1874
- Chairman: Dr Hugh Williams
- Principal: Kristy Kendall
- Employees: ~350
- Years offered: ELC–12
- Gender: Girls (ELC–Year 12)
- Enrolment: ~1,000 (P–12)
- Colours: Red, gold and blue
- Affiliation: Girls Sport Victoria
- Website: www.toorakcollege.vic.edu.au

Toorak College is an independent, inter-denominational, boarding and day school for girls from early learning-Year 12. The school is located on the Mornington Peninsula, above Port Phillip Bay in Mount Eliza, a town approximately forty kilometres south of Melbourne, Victoria, Australia.

In 2005, the school enrolled approximately 925 students from Kindergarten through the 12th grade, including 70 boarders for grades 7 through 12. Toorak's co-educational Early Learning Centre and junior school (years K–6) is an IB World School, and offers the IB Primary Years Programme.

Toorak College is affiliated with the Association of Heads of Independent Schools of Australia, the Junior School Heads Association of Australia (JSHAA), the Alliance of Girls' Schools Australasia, the Association of Independent Schools of Victoria (AISV), the Australian Boarding Schools Association, and is a founding member of Girls Sport Victoria.

== History ==
Toorak College takes its name from the township of Toorak, where it opened as a boys' school on Wednesday, 21 January 1874. At first, classes were held in the brick hall of St John's Presbyterian Church on Jackson Street, Toorak, but the school soon moved into specially erected buildings on nearby Douglas Street. The founding principal in 1854 was John Stevens Miller, a Scot who had been involved in several schools since his arrival in Victoria.

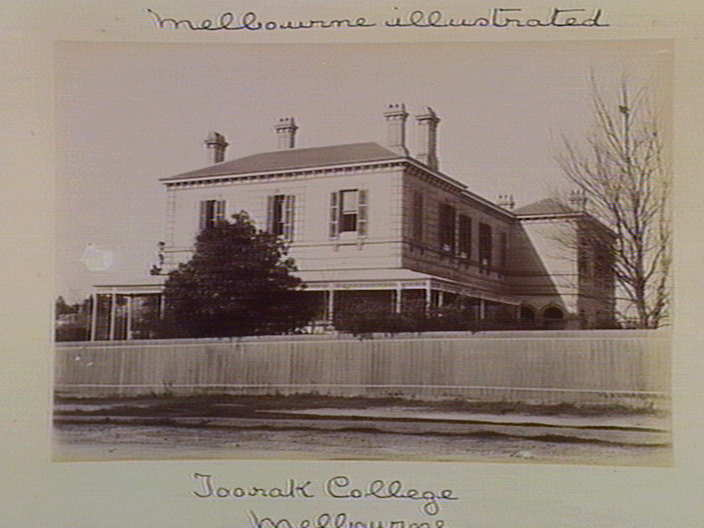
The College at Toorak, 1889

His successor, John Thomas Craig, was also a Scot and consequently the school maintained a nominal association with the Presbyterian church for some years. During his years at Toorak College (1877–1895), Craig built the school into one of the largest privately owned schools in Melbourne. After the prosperity of the 1880s, the economic difficulties of the next decade reduced enrolments dramatically. Craig, whose health had never been strong, leased his school to Margaret Oliver Tripp.

Tripp had many educational interests and considerable teaching experience. Assisted by two of her sisters, she took over Toorak College on 4 February 1895. In 1897, she changed Toorak College from a boys' school to a school for girls.

Toorak College was a very small school when its next principal, Ellen Blundell Pye, arrived late in 1899. She encouraged the playing of a range of sports such as tennis, basketball, athletics, cricket and rowing. Slowly, the number of pupils increased and a school spirit developed, expressed in the "Games Song" written during this period. The original building and the Red House, built by Pye to house junior boarders, still stand on Douglas Street as part of Glamorgan School, now the Toorak campus of Geelong Grammar School.

Ill health forced Ellen Pye to retire at the end of 1907, and the three Hamilton sisters came from Alexandra College, Hamilton, to take her place. They remained for nearly thirty years. Isabella and Robina ("Beanie") were co-principals and Barbara was in charge of the boarding house. Although new buildings were erected, the site at Douglas Street was no longer adequate. In 1919, the school moved to Mayfield Avenue off Glenferrie Road, DOIST Malvern. A severe influenza epidemic delayed the opening of classes that year until 10 March.

The parents and "old girls" of the school came to its rescue late in 1926, as it was proposed to close Toorak College. Many felt that the loss of the college and the influence of the Hamiltons would be detrimental to the education of girls. After speech night, in 1926, a committee of parents was established for the purpose of continuing Toorak College as a private company. The school was moved into temporary premises known as "The Towers", on Lansell Road, Toorak, while a new home was found for it.

Late in 1928, the school moved for the third time, this time to its present site in Mount Eliza. For the next fifteen years, during which the Hamiltons retired and the country suffered another economic depression and then a war, enrolments were very low and the school continued only because of the support of its pupils, past and present. One sign of a recovery in Toorak College's fortunes was when Mrs Wardle (headmistress 1943–1958) established junior classes. These were held in places as far apart as the "Long Walk" (new year nine block), the "Elephant", and the "Dolls House", until 1957 when, due to the gifts of Sir Reginald Ansett and Sir Norman Carson, two benefactors of the school, a separate junior school was built on Charles Street, and named Wardle House.

By the time Wardle retired in 1958, the composition of the pupils at the school had begun to change dramatically from the country boarding school as visualised by the Hamiltons. The growth of the Mornington Peninsula as a residential zone created a demand for education for day girls, and the years Lillian Bush spent as headmistress (1961–1966) saw great developments in facilities at the school. Wardle House gained a hall and an extra classroom; the Norman Carson Library was in full use; the Mary Herring Hall was built and the science block planned.

Dorothea Cerutty led the school during the decade 1967–1976. Under her leadership, Toorak College experienced a period of considerable growth. It gained audio-visual facilities, and a swimming pool, new boarding house and the chapel were opened. In 1981, the school council undertook to have a history of the school written and in November 1987, The Echoes Fade Not: a history of Toorak College, was launched. Cerutty house, the most successful house in the school, was named after her.

A new years seven and eight classroom block was completed in 1983 on the site formerly occupied by the memorial block, and the new year 10 block and the refurbishing of the "Long Walk" classrooms as homes for year nine students were completed in 1984.

In 2005, the college was serving the needs of approximately 925 students from Kindergarten through the 12th grade, including 70 boarders for grades 7 through 12.

== Leadership ==
The school operates a student prefect system, along with a deputy and head girl position. Students may also become 'house captains' for each of the six school houses. Students play a role in fundraising, formal events, and student democracy.

== House system ==
Toorak College's house system began in 1928, when the school moved to Mount Eliza. Pupils were allotted to Douglas, Mayfield or Hamilton: the first two named after earlier addresses of the school and Hamilton after the then principal. In 1948, a further house, Tripp, for day girls was founded, but as day student numbers grew, a second house, Pye, was introduced for them in 1955. The original three houses remained for boarders until 1962 when boarders and day girls were integrated in each of the houses. In 1984, another house was added, Cerutty, to honour Dorothea Cerutty, who led the school during the decade 1967–1976.

Wardle House (years prep-six) offers three houses: Gold; Blue and Red. Students represent their house in sports including athletics, swimming and cross country.

Upon entering year seven, students become a member of one of the six houses, Cerutty, Douglas, Hamilton, Mayfield, Pye or Tripp. The house system incorporates every student from years 7 to 12, with year level captains voted in by fellow house members at the beginning of each school year.

The six houses compete in extra-curricular activities. Whole house competitions include house singing and house cross country, while members can also compete in diving, athletics, swimming, drama, variety, debating, football (Australian rules), soccer, small group singing (madrigals) and instrumental groups.

The house system has an awards and merits system to reward both individual and collective efforts. Girls who are involved with all aspects of house life during their first three years at Toorak College are awarded "half house colours". A limited number of students are awarded the Whole House Colours Award at a ceremony in their final year. The Aggregate Cup is awarded to the house with the most accumulated points at the end of the school year. Cups are also awarded at Speech Night for all individual events mentioned above.

== Sport ==
Toorak College is a member of Girls Sport Victoria (GSV).

=== GSV premierships ===
Toorak College has won the following GSV premierships.

- Badminton (4) – 2010, 2012, 2013, 2014
- Cricket – 2001
- Soccer – 2009
- Softball – 2002
- Triathlon, Mini – 2015
- Volleyball (6) – 2001, 2002, 2003, 2004, 2007, 2009

== School grounds ==
Toorak College's grounds cover 11.5 hectares, sloping down towards Port Philip Bay. School buildings provide students with multi-purpose recreational buildings as well as curricular-specific centres.

There is a senior student centre (Bardon House) for girls completing their VCE in years 11 and 12. This facility provides girls with an interactive lecture theatre, equipped with computer networking and desks for 134 students; three adjoining "breakout rooms" for year 11 and 12 classes of 6–12 students; a silent study room, equipped with individual computer networked alcoves for exam preparation and general senior study, accessible print and copy facilities and also a large student common room. The common room includes a student lounge, a kitchen, breakfast bar, stereo system and television, as well as multiple computer network banks to support the school's extensive notebook computer program. Bardon House houses all year 11 and 12 lockers, as well as the head of VCE and deputy head of VCE staff offices.

Adjoining Bardon House is the "TC Cafe" which operates as a canteen used by the whole school community.

The college also provides arts students with a purpose built visual arts centre, including specialist resources for graphics, photography, painting and drawing, multimedia, catering, textiles and ceramics.

All school buildings include:

- School chapel
- Senior school hall (Formerly Mary Herring Hall, new hall currently under construction in 2023)
- Junior school hall (MacLean Hall)
- Boarding house (Joan Ansett Hall) for 90 students, international and local
- Dining room
- Printing department
- Six bed health centre
- School psychology and counselling department (Connected to health centre)
- College store (Uniform Shop)
- Hamilton Building (Teachers offices, year 10 common room and consecutive classrooms)
- Bardon House (Lecture theatres, study/breakout rooms and year 11–12 common rooms)
- Swift Science and Technology Centre
- Visual Arts Centre
- Marjorie Williams Centre (Sports building)
- Junior school consecutive classrooms (ELC–6th grade)
- Junior and Senior school reception
- Memorial Block (Year 7–8s consecutive classrooms)
- Norman Carson Library (Senior School)
- Denise Hargreaves Library (Junior School)
- Music and Drama Department
- Diving and Swimming Pools
- Jean Robinson Oval
- TC Cafe

The majority of administrative and teaching staff offices are in the original school building (The Hamilton Building, established 1928). The college has two libraries. The senior school library (the Norman Carson Library) contains an audio visual centre capable of transmitting audio and video images throughout the school. The junior school library (the Denise Hargreaves Library) was extended in 1994.

The library is also home to the Toorak College Old Girls' Association Archives Centre which houses the Elizabeth Beischer memorabilia collection.

The junior school has three outside play areas as well as purpose-built foundation years areas.

There is a sport and performing arts complex (the Marjorie Williams Centre) which includes a gymnasium (basketball court), dance studio, drama rooms including a theatre for performance, two squash courts and two weight-training rooms.

The school features an aquatic centre complete with a 25-metre swimming pool and competition standard diving pool (including one- and three- metre towers). College grounds also include three large playing fields (including the Jean Robinson Oval), five tennis courts and a netball/basketball court.

== Alumni ==
Alumnae of Toorak College are commonly referred to as "Old Girls", and may elect to join the schools alumni association, the Toorak College Old Girls Association (TCOGA). The TCOGA was founded on 15 June 1908, as a way of keeping past students in touch with one another. In 1918, its name was changed to "The Old Girls Association of Toorak College", and featured a membership of 389. Today there are approximately 3,000 members, and the association aims to support the college by providing such things as funds for the archives centre, scholarships, student prizes, the year 12 leavers' cocktail party and year seven luncheon. The TCOGA also supports a golf and tennis team which compete against other old collegian associations.

Some notable former students of Toorak College:

Architecture

- Arthur Anderson – architect

Aviation

- Freda Thompson – aviator, fifth woman in Australia to attain a commercial pilot's licence

Clergy

- Sir Francis William Rolland – clergyman and educator

Entertainment, media and the arts

- Dame Zara Bate DBE – fashion designer and wife of former prime minister, Harold Holt (also attended Ruyton Girls' School)
- Jean Kittson – Australian performer, writer and comedian best known for her role as the news commentator on the ABC TV comedy program The Big Gig in the early 1990s
- Brooke Satchwell – Australian actress from the TV show Neighbours
- Lara Jean Marshall – actress and recording artist best known for her co-star role on The Saddle Club
- Marion Sinclair – wrote the popular nursery rhyme "Kookaburra (sits on the old gum tree)"
- Joanna Murray-Smith – novelist, screenwriter and playwright

Medicine and science

- Vera Scantlebury Brown – medical practitioner
- Gwynneth Buchanan – zoologist
- Thomas Stephen Hart – scientist
- Dame Mary Ranken Lyle Herring – physician and community worker

Athletes

- Jane Robinson
- Jess Hosking
- Sarah Hosking

== See also ==
- List of schools in Victoria, Australia
