= Fintona Girls' School =

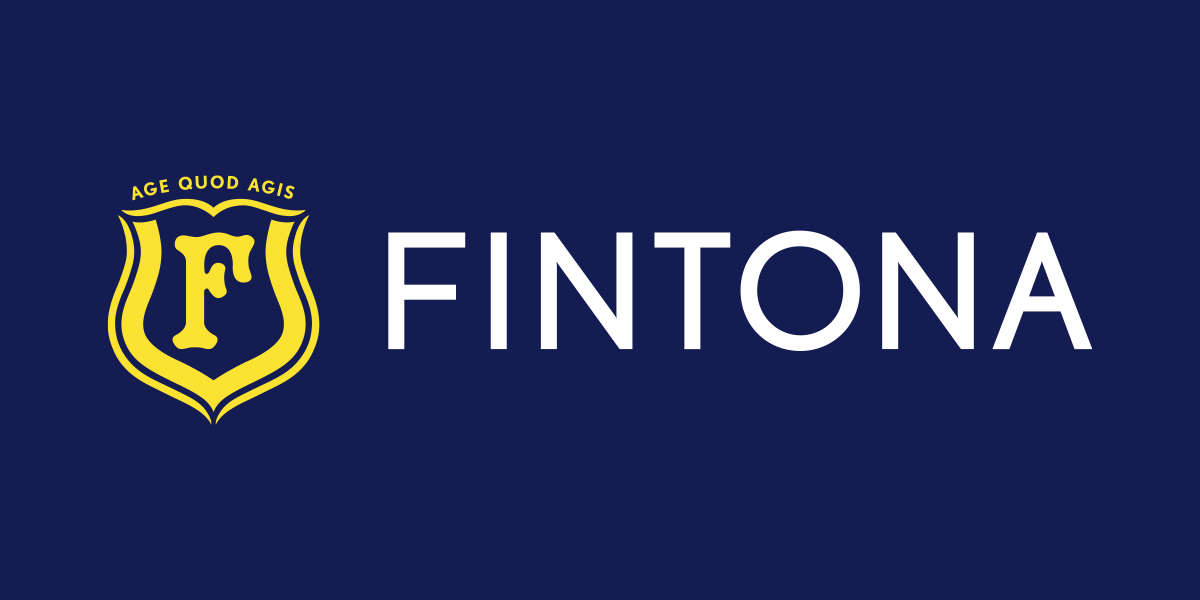

Location
- Balwyn, Victoria; Australia
- Coordinates: 37°48′51″S 145°4′48″E

Information
- Type: Independent, girls' school, Christian, day school
- Motto: Age Quod Agis (Latin) (Do what you are doing)
- Denomination: Non-denominational
- Established: 1896
- Chairman: Jackie Besley
- Principal: Rachael Falloon
- Staff: ~120
- Years offered: ELC–12
- Gender: Girls
- Enrolment: ~600 (K–12)
- Colours: Navy blue and gold
- Slogan: Do what you do well
- Affiliation: Girls Sport Victoria
- Website: www.fintona.vic.edu.au

Fintona Girls' School is a small, independent, non-denominational, day school for girls, located in Balwyn, Melbourne, Victoria, Australia.

Established in 1896, Fintona is a non-selective school and currently caters for approximately 600 students from the Early Learning Centre (ELC) to Year 12.

Fintona is a member of Girls Sport Victoria (GSV), the Alliance of Girls Schools Australia (AGSA), the Junior School Heads Association of Australia (JSHAA), and the Association of Heads of Independent Schools of Australia (AHISA).

== History ==
Fintona was established as a Presbyterian, day and boarding school for girls, in 1896. The school was founded by Annie Hughston and was originally located in the Melbourne suburb of Camberwell.

The school occupies 'Balwyn', the historic home and vineyard built by early settler Andrew Murray, from which the suburb of Balwyn takes its name.

== Principals ==
Period	Details	Notes
1896–1921	Annie Hughston	
1922–1926	Isobel Macdonald	
1927–1929	Majory Black	
1930–1934	Jeanie McCowan	
1935–1962	Margaret Cunningham	
1963–1991	Elizabeth Butt	
1992–2000	Deborah Seifert	
2001–2005	Karen Starr	
2006–2017	Suzy Chandler	
2018–present	Rachael Falloon	

== Curriculum ==
Fintona Girls' School is divided into 4 teaching sections:

- The Early Learning Centre (ELC)
- Junior School, catering for Prep to Year 4
- Middle School, catering for Years 5 to Year 8
- Senior School, catering for Years 9 to 12

The school's ELC curriculum is based on the Reggio Emilia approach to education. From Prep to Year 6, students are involved in the International Baccalaureate Primary Years Program which covers the subject areas of language, social studies, mathematics, science and technology, arts, and personal, social and physical education.

Fintona offers three languages, Latin, French and Japanese.

== Houses ==
The three Junior School (P–4) houses of Fintona are Bedggood, Menzies and Reid. The six Middle and Senior School (years 5–12) houses of Fintona are Boyne (after school benefactors), Clarke (after first Fintona boarder and matriculant), Hughston (after first headmistress), Murdoch (after Patrick John Murdoch of Trinity Church, Camberwell, where many boarders attended), Maxwell (after father of one of Fintona's first prefects), Ower (after member of staff 1900–1930).

== Sport ==
Fintona is a member of Girls Sport Victoria (GSV).

=== GSV premierships ===
Fintona has won the following GSV premiership.

- Basketball – 2001

== Notable alumnae ==
Old Fintonians Association logo

Ex-students of Fintona Girls' School are known as 'Old Fintonians' and may elect to join the 'Old Fintonians Association'. Some notable 'Old Fintonians' include:

Media, entertainment and the arts

- Norma Bull – Australian painter

Medicine and science

- Dora Mary Lush – pioneer bacteriologist
- Dame Beryl Beaurepaire AC, DBE (née Bedggood) – feminist, former chairwoman of the Federal Women's Committee of the Liberal Party of Australia, wife of Ian Beaurepaire (of Beaurepaire tyre's fame)
- Helen Caldicott – environmentalist and anti-nuclear campaigner
- Andrea Coote – politician
- Pattie Maie Menzies (née Leckie) – wife of former prime minister Robert Menzies, appointed Dame Grand Cross of the Order of the British Empire (Civil) for public duty in hospital work

Sport

- Louise Bawden – Olympic volleyball player
- Georgia Griffith – Tokyo 2020 Olympics middle-distance athlete

== See also ==
- List of schools in Victoria
- Victorian Certificate of Education
