= Mount St. Joseph Girls' College =

Location
- 133 Maidstone Street; Altona, Victoria, 3018; Australia; 37°51′51″S 144°48′42″E

Information
- Type: Secondary, Single sex identifier school, day school
- Denomination: Roman Catholic, Josephites
- Established: 1964
- Principal: Kate Dishon
- Employees: approximately $5,000 per year
- Enrolment: approximately 1153 students
- Colours: Navy blue and white
- School fees: $5,200 to 5,900 per year
- Website: www.msj.vic.edu.au

Mount St. Joseph Girls' College is a Catholic Girls College located in Maidstone Street, Altona, Victoria, Australia. Mount St. Joseph Girls’ College is one of few schools in Australia that is a Josephite college, founded by the Josephite Order in 1964.

== History ==
=== Beginnings ===
In the early 1960s, the Sisters of St Joseph of the Sacred Heart made plans for a school for young women in the western suburbs of Melbourne. The school was built in Altona West and opened in February 1964.

Their logo is a white lily, and the college motto is 'Virtue Courage'.

=== Previous principals ===
The college has seen 10 principals since its foundation, 7 of which were Sisters of St Joseph of the Sacred Heart:

- Mary John Forster RSJ (Founding Principal): 1964–1967
- Romuald Pierce RSJ: 1967–1970
- Anne O'Brien RSJ: 1971
- Nora Finucane RSJ: 1971–1973
- Giovanni Farquer RSJ: 1974–981
- Margaret Blampied RSJ: 1982–1985
- Helen T Reed RSJ: 1986–2002
- Regina Byrne: 2002–2008
- Catherine Dillon: 2008–2015
- Kate Dishon: 2016–present

=== Sport ===
There are 6 house colours for sport days and college events, which are:

==== Penola (yellow) ====
Named after the town in South Australia where Mary MacKillop and Julian Tenison Woods established the order of the Sisters of St Joseph and the first Josephite school.

==== Kincumber (blue) ====
Named after the town north of Sydney, where the Sisters of St Joseph opened an orphanage for street children in 1887.

==== McCormack (green) ====
Named after Irene McCormack who worked in the village of Huasihuasi, Peru and was fatally shot by members of a guerilla rebel group on 21 May 1991.

==== Solomon (red) ====
Named after Emmanuel Solomon, a wealthy Jewish philanthropist who generously supported the poor and disadvantaged.

==== Cameron (orange) ====
Named after Mary MacKillop's relatives, the Cameron's, whom she was governess for when she moved to Penola at the age of 18.

==== Providence (purple) ====
During the early years of the Sisters of St Joseph of the Sacred Heart's work across Australia, the Sisters established a number of Houses of Providence. These houses served as a refuge for young women and children who did not have access to a safe home or food.

== See also ==
- List of schools in Victoria
