= St Patrick's College, Townsville =

Catholic secondary school in Australia

Coordinates: 19°15′05″S 146°48′57.2″E

Information
- Motto: Dare to imagine
- Established: 1878
- Principal: Kath Little
- Website: https://www.stpatscollege.qld.edu.au/

St Patrick's College is an independent, Catholic, Girls', high school and Boarding School located in the city of Townsville, in North Queensland, Australia. It is administered by the Queensland Catholic Education Commission, with an enrolment of 627 students and a teaching staff of 62, as of 2023. The school serves students from Year 7 to Year 12.

== History ==
St Patrick's College was founded around the same time as the Townsville Grammar School, possibly in 1878, by a group of Irish nuns from the Sisters of Mercy order. The Sisters were pioneers of education in North Queensland, and the college stands as a monument to their contributions.

The schools official opening is dated as 1 January 1904.

With onset of World War II in the Pacific, St Patrick's vacated the College buildings located on The Strand for use by the allied war effort, namely the W.R.A.A.F units. The Wartime College and boarding students were moved to different locations, West End and Ravenswood respectively.

During the 1960s and 1970s the college adapted to educational requirements of exam criteria developed by governmental Educational Departments. Later government grants brought new infrastructure providing a library, new science laboratories, social science and language facilities and later computer technology.

In 2008, the then current students could participate in the UN youth summit.

== Notable alumni ==
- Madge Ryan, Australian actress,
- Valma Weetman, R.A.A.F Corporal in the 1950s.
