= Marian College (Sunshine West) =

Location
- Sunshine West, Melbourne, Victoria; Australia; 37°47′15″S 144°48′22″E

Information
- Type: Independent secondary day school
- Motto: Latin: Fortiter et Suaviter (Strength and Kindness)
- Religious affiliation: Brigidine Sisters
- Denomination: Roman Catholic
- Established: 1957; 69 years ago
- Principal: Angela Romano
- Gender: Girls
- Enrolment: c. 800
- Campus type: Suburban
- Colours: Navy blue, cherry red and white
- Website: www.mariansw.catholic.edu.au

Marian College is an independent Roman Catholic secondary day school for girls, located in the outer Melbourne suburb of Sunshine West, Victoria, Australia.

The school was established in 1957 by the Brigidine Sisters and since 2014 now works under the governance of the Kildare Ministries. Marian College is one of seven Kildare Ministries secondary schools in Victoria and South Australia and continues to hold the Brigidine Tradition as a valuable and significant part of its heritage.

Marian College seeks to provide young women with the opportunity to be educated within a school environment that allows and encourages each person to develop fully as an individual, and as a community member. In 2023 there were 832 girls enrolled at the school.

== See also ==
- List of non-government schools in Victoria
- Victorian Certificate of Education
- Vocational Education and Training
- Victorian Certificate of Applied Learning
