= Camberwell Girls Grammar School =

Location
- Canterbury, Melbourne, Victoria; Australia; 37°49′5″S 145°3′35″E

Information
- Type: private, single sex, early learning, primary and secondary, Christian day school
- Motto: Utilis in Ministerium (Useful in Service)
- Denomination: Anglican
- Established: February 1920; 106 years ago
- Chairman: Nikita Weickhardt
- Principal: Debbie Dunwoody
- Chaplain: Rev. Helen Creed
- Years: Early Learning to Year 12
- Gender: Girls
- Enrolment: 820
- Colours: Navy & light blue
- Slogan: Create Your Tomorrow
- Affiliation: Association of Heads of Independent Schools of Australia; Junior School Heads Association of Australia; Alliance of Girls' Schools Australasia; Association of Independent Schools of Victoria; Girls Sport Victoria
- Website: cggs.vic.edu.au

Camberwell Girls Grammar School is a private Anglican early learning, primary and secondary day school for girls located in Canterbury, an eastern suburb of Melbourne, Victoria, Australia. Founded in 1920 in the hall of St Mark's Church in Camberwell, the school welcomes students of all cultures and currently caters for 820 students from Early learning to Year 12.

The school is a member of the Association of Heads of Independent Schools of Australia, the Junior School Heads Association of Australia, the Alliance of Girls' Schools Australasia, the Association of Independent Schools of Victoria, and is a founding member of Girls Sport Victoria.

== History ==
Camberwell Girls Grammar School was founded in February 1920. Charged by the Archbishop of Melbourne, Henry Lowther Clarke, the parishioners of St Mark's Church in Camberwell embarked on a significant project. Led by their vicar, Hubert Brooksbank, they established St Mark's Parish School.

With just $1,000, Brooksbank built a brick hall for the school to operate from. Opening with eight pupils, both boys and girls, the school flourished and by 1925 there were 70 students and by 1926 the school had outgrown its home.

In late 1926, the school council purchased "Torrington", a nearby home, for $7,500. With frontage to both Torrington and Woodstock streets, the property was in an ideal position. The grounds and the main building had potential to be a school.

Over the 1926 Christmas holidays, the council members and families worked on the "Torrington" property and in February 1927 the school moved to its new home.

In November 1964, Ormiston Girls' School, the oldest girls' school on the Australian mainland and the oldest in Victoria, accepted the offer to merge with Camberwell Girls Grammar School. The following year, the two schools came together as one.

== Ormiston ==
The school's junior school, Ormiston, was established in 1849 and is the oldest girls' school on Australian mainland and the oldest in Victoria. The history of Ormiston is one of private enterprise by pioneer women, mostly young women, who spent years of their lives in service of the infant state educating girls of the time. They enjoyed no financial assistance from church or public funds.

At 166 years of age, Ormiston has only had a few sites. For 52 years it operated out of buildings in East Melbourne before moving to Mont Albert in 1901. In 1964, Ormiston accepted the offer to merge with Camberwell Girls Grammar School. The following year, the two schools officially become one with the junior students working from the St John’s Avenue Campus (Ormiston) and the senior students at the Torrington Street campus. In 2007, the two schools were formally united as one with the opening of the junior school on Mont Albert Road.

== House system ==
The school population is divided into four houses. The school house system builds spirit and maintains tradition. Being part of a house ensures that girls are connected across year levels.

- Lawrence House (Red) – Received its name from George D. Lawrence, a lawyer who was a member of the founding council of the school and remained very active in the council for 20 years.
- Schofield House (Yellow) – Received its name from James Schofield, chairman of the school council from 1921. His daughters were among the first students at the school.
- Taylor House (Green) – Received its name from Louisa Taylor, the first headmistress of the school. She was headmistress from 1928 to 1959.
- Singleton House (Blue) – Was established in 1965 when Ormiston became part of Camberwell Girls Grammar School. Received its name from the Singleton sisters former, headmistresses of Ormiston.

The girls participate in many house competitions such as House athletics, swimming, cross country, diving, drama, dance, theatre sports, debating and music.

== Principals ==
Period	Officeholders	Notes
1920–1927	Elizabeth Lockley	
1928–1959	Louisa S. Taylor	
1959–1973	Dorothy E. Hall	
1973–1988	Barbara Sutton	Old Grammarian
1989–2000	Barbara Fary OAM	
2001–2014	Anne Feehan	
2014–present	Debbie Dunwoody	

== Sport ==
Camberwell Girls Grammar is a member of Girls Sport Victoria (GSV).

=== GSV premierships ===
Camberwell Girls Grammar has won the following GSV premierships.

- Basketball (3) – 2009, 2011, 2012
- Indoor Cricket (2) – 2011, 2013

== Notable alumnae ==
Alumnae of Camberwell Girls Grammar School are known as "Old Grammarians" or "Old Girls" and may elect to join the school's alumni association, the Old Grammarians' Association (OGA). Some notable old grammarians include:

- Joan Child AO – first female Speaker of the Australian House of Representatives
- Vika and Linda Bull – Award winning Australian vocal duo.
- Chyka Keebaugh – media and television personality
- Cecilia Cheung – Hong Kong actress and singer

== See also ==
- List of schools in Victoria
- List of high schools in Melbourne
- List of Anglican schools in Australia
