= Mentone Girls' Grammar School =

Location
- Mentone, Victoria, Australia; 37°59′22″S 145°3′48″E

Information
- Type: Independent, single-sex, day school
- Motto: Latin: Vero Nihil Verius (Nothing truer than Truth)
- Denomination: Anglican
- Established: 1899
- Chairman: James Stewart
- Principal: Lauren Perfect
- Staff: ≈100
- Years offered: ELC–12
- Gender: Girls
- Enrolment: ≈800 (ELC–12)
- Colours: Murrey, blue and gold
- Slogan: Known, Seen and Heard.
- Affiliation: Girls Sport Victoria
- Website: mentonegirls.vic.edu.au

Mentone Girls' Grammar School is an independent, Anglican day school for girls, located in Mentone, a bayside suburb of Melbourne, Victoria, Australia.

Established in 1899 as the Mentone High School for Girls', the school has a non-selective enrolment policy and currently caters for over 700 students, with girls enrolled in the Early Learning Centre (3 and 4 years of age), Kindergarten to Year 12.

Mentone Girls' Grammar is a member of Girls Sport Victoria (GSV), the Junior School Heads Association of Australia (JSHAA), the Association of Heads of Independent Schools of Australia (AHISA), the National Coalition of Girls' Schools (NCGS), the Association of Independent Schools of Victoria (AISV), and the Alliance of Girls' Schools Australasia. The School is an Australian Securities & Investments Commission MoneySmart School and an eSmart School.

In 2014 Mentone Girls' Grammar School became the first school in the world to receive the Certificate of International Education with the Council of International Schools (CIS).

== History ==
Mentone Girls' Grammar School was established in 1899 as the Mentone High School for Girls, by the four Simpson sisters at "Cobbalanna", in Como Parade, Mentone. "Cobbalanna" is now the name given to the new VCE Centre. In 1924, the school was re-opened as the Mentone Girls' Grammar School (St. Margaret's) under the leadership of the then headmistress, Evaline Mary Pearson.

Mentone Girls' Grammar became affiliated with the Church of England in 1962, and subsequently the bishop's mitre was added to the school crest. Parts of the campus are named after recent headmistresses and headmaster. For example, the Prudence Lewty hall was named after former headmistress Prudence Lewty.

== Campus ==
Mentone Girls' Grammar School is located on single campus in suburban Mentone, directly adjacent to Mentone Beach. Features of the campus include: a pre–tertiary learning centre for students in Years 11 and 12 known as the "Cobbalanna Senior College", the Junior School with specialised facilities, the Simpson Art Centre with facilities for photography and ceramics, "The Bay Cafe" is a cafeteria style lunch space, the David Hunt centre (named after the former Head Master) utilized for performing arts, the Annette Kellerman science wing and pool, named for the underwater ballerina of the same name, whose mother was a member of staff at the school during the 1920s, library, multi-media laboratories, and performing arts spaces. Sporting facilities include tennis courts, a gymnasium, a 25-metre outdoor heated swimming pool and a smaller indoor heated pool used by the ELC and Prep students.

The school also makes use of outside facilities such as Mentone Beach.

In 2019, Mentone Girls' Grammar opened their Wellbeing Precinct, transforming one third of the entire campus to make way for facilities such as an indoor pool with diving boards, multi-purpose courts for netball and basketball, and a synthetic multi-use pitch for soccer, hockey and tennis.

== School crest ==
The Mentone Girls' Grammar School crest was designed in 1924, by headmistress, Mary Pearson. To complement the school crest, Pearson developed the school motto of Vero Nihil Verius, which may be translated from Latin as "Nothing truer than Truth".

The crest is based on the design of St George's shield, and is made up of four components:

- The three stars represent the Holy Trinity: God the Father; God the Son and God the Holy Spirit.
- The three wavy gold lines symbolise the school's location by a bay.
- The bishop's mitre was added in 1963 to signify the School's association with the Anglican Church of Australia.
- The colours of murrey, blue and gold, also add significance. Murrey, a traditional heraldic colour, represents the blood of Christ. Blue represents both the sky and the water and indicates the height and depth of learning. Gold represents the sands of the shore.

Former headmistress, Prudence Lewty and bursar Mary Coxall added a laurel wreath around the crest in 1963. In heraldic terms, the laurel wreath identifies heroes returning from battle and technically should only be displayed on crests which have been carried into battle. For this reason the laurel wreath was removed in 1999.

== Houses ==
There are 4 Houses at Mentone Girls Grammar School.

- Grammar House (Red)
- St Margaret's (Saints) House (Gold)
- McCowan House (Green)
- Kent House (Blue)

Annual house competitions include house athletics, house cross country, house swimming, house enterprise, house music, house dance and house aerobics.

== Co-curriculum ==
=== Sport ===
Mentone Girls' Grammar School has been a member of Girls Sport Victoria since its foundation in 2001. Through this association, students from Year 7 to 12 are given the opportunity to compete against 24 other girls' schools, in up to twelve different sports. Students from Year 4 to 6 participate in the local CDPSSA inter-school sports program.

==== GSV premierships ====
Mentone Girls' Grammar has won the following GSV premiership.

- Hockey – 2002
- Division 1 Diving - 2024

== Notable alumnae ==
Alumnae of Mentone Girls' Grammar School are known as Old Girls and may elect to join the schools alumni association, the Old Girls Club (OGC). Some notable Old Girls' include:

- Zoë Badwi – Australian singer-songwriter, model, and actress
- Dulcie Boling – Magazine editor and company director
- Nicole Bradtke – Professional tennis player
- Lucy Christopher – Professional writer of young adult novels
- Annette Kellermann – Swimmer, aquatic performer and film actress
- Jenny Kinder – Choreographer; Founding director of TasDance; Head of School of Dance at the Victorian College of the Arts
- Vera Mackie – Australian Research Council Professorial Fellow, History, The University of Melbourne
- Alison Downie – athlete

== See also ==
- List of schools in Victoria
- List of high schools in Victoria
- Victorian Certificate of Education
- International Baccalaureate
