= Kildare College =

Location
- Holden Hill, Adelaide, South Australia; Australia; 34°51′23″S 138°40′17″E

Information
- Type: Independent secondary day school
- Motto: Latin: Fortiter et Suaviter (Strength and Gentleness)
- Religious affiliation: Kildare Ministries
- Denomination: Roman Catholic
- Established: 1966; 60 years ago
- Principal: Tina Neate
- Gender: Girls
- Enrolment: 620
- Campus type: Suburban
- Colours: Burgundy, green and yellow
- Website: www.kildare.catholic.edu.au

Kildare College is a Catholic secondary day college for girls in Years 7–12, located in the Adelaide suburb of Holden Hill, South Australia. The school works under the governance of Kildare Education Ministries and was established, based on an invitation by the Archbishop of Adelaide, in 1966.

== Houses ==
Kildare has five houses

- Brigid (yellow): Named for Brigid, a fifth-century Irish saint, renowned for her hospitality and compassion whose first monastery was established at Kildare.
- Delany (red): Named for the bishop of the diocese of Kildare and Leighlin who founded the Brigidine Sisters in Tullow in 1807.
- Kildare (blue): The diocese in Ireland whose patron saint is St Brigid and in which the Brigidine head house is situated.
- Chanel (white): Sister Chanel Gough was the first Australian Brigidine sister to become Superior General of the Brigidine Sisters, who held this position when Kildare College was established in 1966.
- Nagle (purple): Named for Honora "Nano" Nagle founded the "Sisters of the Presentation of the Blessed Virgin Mary" in Ireland and was a pioneer of Catholic education in Ireland. Nagle House was established in 2018
