= Our Lady of Sion College =

Coordinates: 37°49′05″S 145°07′48″E

- Box Hill, Victoria; Australia

Information
- Type: Catholic, single-sex, day
- Motto: Latin: Veritas in Caritate (Truth in Love)
- Denomination: Catholic
- Established: 1928
- Principal: Rebecca Cetrola
- Years offered: 7–12
- Gender: Girls
- Colours: Black, cherry, white
- Slogan: Truth in Love
- Affiliation: Girls Sport Victoria
- Website: http://web.sion.catholic.edu.au/

Our Lady of Sion College is a Catholic school for girls located in Box Hill, Melbourne, Australia.

The current principal is Rebecca Cetrola.

== Sport ==
Sion is a member of Girls Sport Victoria (GSV).

== Notable alumni ==
- Deborah Lawrie – Australia's first female commercial airline pilot
- Rosie Dillon – AFLW Footballer (St Kilda)
- Rachael Haynes – Australian Women's Cricket Captain (Ashes 2017) and Women's Big Bash League player (Sydney Thunder)
