= Worawa Aboriginal College =

Location
- Victoria; Australia; 37.6846°S 145.5080°E

Information
- Established: 1983
- Website: http://www.worawa.vic.edu.au

Worawa Aboriginal College is a private boarding school for Aboriginal girls in Healesville, Victoria, Australia.

== History ==
The school was established by Hyllus Maris in 1983. It was shut down in December 2007 for failing to meet minimum registration requirements, but was re-opened in May 2008.

== Description ==
Worawa is an all-girls boarding school catering for young Aboriginal women in Years 7 to 12.

== Ambassadors ==
As of 2021, ambassadors for the college include Angela Bates, Executive Producer of NITV Current Affairs; actor Deborah Mailman; lawyer Abigail Burchill; and AFL umpire Glenn James. In 2015 Anita Heiss became an ambassador for the school, but she is not listed on the Ambassadors' web page.
