= Killester College =

Location
- Springvale, Melbourne, Victoria; Australia; 37°57′32″S 145°9′6″E

Information
- Type: Independent secondary day school
- Motto: Latin: Fortiter et Suaviter (Strength and Kindliness)
- Religious affiliation: Brigidine Sisters Kildare Ministries
- Denomination: Roman Catholic
- Established: 1955
- Sister school: Kilbreda College, Mentone Presentation College, Windsor
- Principal: Antonella Rosati
- Years: 7–12
- Enrollment: c. >900
- Campus type: Suburban
- Colours: Navy blue, light blue, yellow
- Website: www.killester.vic.edu.au

Killester College is an independent Roman Catholic secondary day school for girls, located in the Melbourne suburb of Springvale, Victoria, Australia. Killester was founded by the Brigidine Sisters. Today, Killester College works under the governance of the Kildare Ministries following Brigidine tradition. The school was established in 1955 and in 2020 had a staff of 139 made up of 99 teachers and 40 support staff.

== Notable alumni ==
- Anne Ferguson

== See also ==
- List of non-government schools in Victoria
- Victorian Certificate of Education
- Vocational Education and Training
- Victorian Certificate of Applied Learning
