= St Clare's College, Waverley =

St Clare's College

Location
- Waverley, Eastern Suburbs, Sydney; Australia; 33°54′3″S 151°15′13″E

Information
- Type: Independent single-sex, secondary day school
- Motto: Latin: Deus Meus Et Omnia (My God in All Things)
- Denomination: Roman Catholicism
- Established: 1885; 141 years ago
- Founders: Poor Clare Sisters
- Educational authority: New South Wales Department of Education
- Oversight: Archdiocese of Sydney
- Principal: Ann Freeman
- Staff: ~43
- Years: 7–12
- Gender: Girls
- Enrolment: ~500 (2005)
- Colours: Maroon, blue and white
- Affiliations: Catholic Girls Secondary Schools Sporting Association; Association of Heads of Independent Girls' Schools
- Website: stclares.syd.catholic.edu.au

St Clare's College is an independent Roman Catholic single-sex secondary day school for girls, located in Waverley, in the Eastern Suburbs of Sydney, New South Wales, Australia.

Established in 1884 by the Poor Clare Sisters, St Clare's has a non-selective enrolment policy and currently caters for approximately 500 girls from Year 7 to Year 12.

The college is located within the Archdiocese of Sydney, and is affiliated with the Catholic Girls Secondary Schools Sporting Association (CGSSSA) and is a member of the Association of Heads of Independent Girls' Schools (AHIGS).

== History ==
Original building purchased by the school in 1885

St Clare's College is unique in that it remains established on its original site and continues under the governance of Sydney Catholic schools.

== Principals ==
| Period | Details |
|---|---|
| 1884–1888 | Sr M. Teresa Lawless |
| 1889 | Mother Anthony Watters |
| 1889–1920 | Sr Francis Maloney |
| 1921–1935 | Sr M. Leontia Reid |
| 1936–1963 | Mother Gabriel Claverie |
| 1964–1982 | Sr Carmel O'Sullivan |
| 1983–1985 | Geoffrey Newcombe |
| 1986–1987 | Elizabeth Brogan |
| 1988–1997 | Sr Janet Heath |
| 1999–2003 | Kitty Guerin |
| 2004–2006 | Catherine Rae |
| 2007 | Acting Principal – Sr Louise Hume (osc) |
| 2008–2014 | Marie Therese Hirschhorn |
| 2015–2020 | Antoinette McGahan |
| 2021–2022 | Kerrie McDiarmid |
| 2023–present | Ann Freeman |

== House system ==
As with most Australian schools, St Clare's uses a house system. The school has four houses, through which students compete in a range of sporting and non-sporting activities. They are:

- Reid (Brown and gold)
- Claverie (Black and red)
- Deakin (Dark blue and light blue)
- Keady (Green and gold)
- Hume (Mauve)

The students earn points for their house through participation in these activities, and the house with the most points at the end of the school year is awarded the 'Babicci Shield'. The Babicci is named after Sister Pauline Babicci, former Mother Abbess of the Poor Clares. The colours of the Houses were decided in consultation with the students at the time the House system was devised. The school also features a tutorial program, whereby each student is assigned to a tutorial in their House, in an attempt to win the annual House Babicci Shield.

== Notable alumnae ==
- Anita Heiss – Author
- Imelda Roche AO – Co-chairman of the Roche Group; a former Chancellor of Bond University; Founder of Nutrimetics

== See also ==
- List of Catholic schools in New South Wales
- Catholic education in Australia
