= St Aloysius' College (Melbourne) =

St Aloysius College
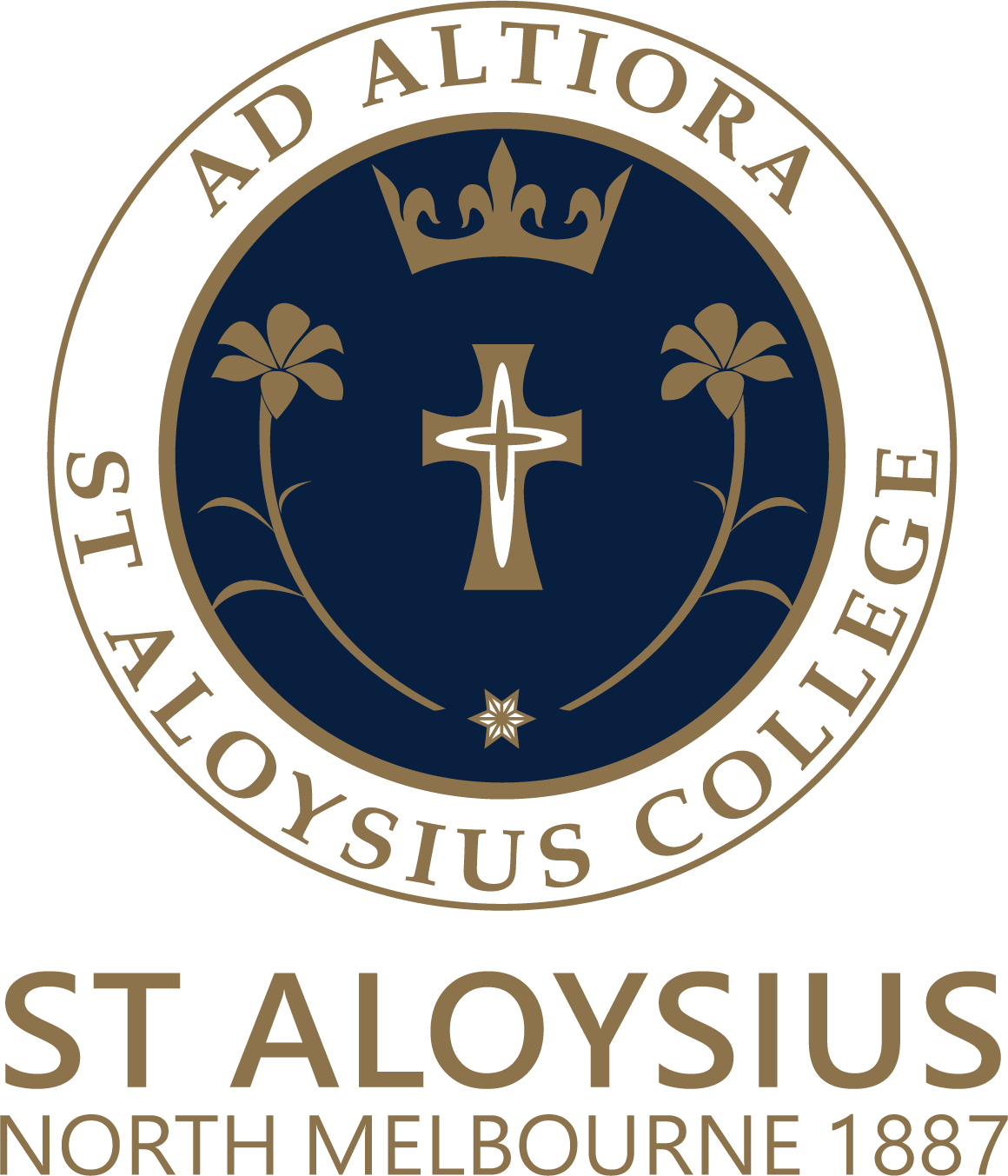

Location
- 31 Curran Street; North Melbourne, Victoria, 3051; Australia; 37°47′34″S 144°56′33″E

Information
- Type: Independent co-educational secondary day school
- Motto: Latin: Ad Altiora (Strive for things that are higher)
- Religious affiliation: Sisters of Mercy
- Denomination: Roman Catholic
- Patron saint: Saint Aloysius Gonzaga
- Established: 1887; 139 years ago
- Founder: Catherine McAuley
- Principal: Mary Farah
- Staff: 68
- Enrollment: 1200 (Approximately)
- Colours: Navy and gold
- Website: www.aloysius.vic.edu.au

St Aloysius College is a Roman Catholic, co-educational secondary day school in North Melbourne, Victoria, Australia. It was established by the Sisters of Mercy in 1887. The college was named after its patron saint – Aloysius Gonzaga.
The four houses of the college are McAuley (blue), Fallon (gold), Verdon (green) and Scully (red).

== Transition to Co-Education ==
In 2020 the School announced that it would become co-educational in 2023, with the first classes of boys to commence from the Year 7 cohort in 2023. Co-educational intakes will continue at Year 7 until transition to co-education is completed in 2028. The Year 7 2022 and earlier cohorts will remain all-girls.

== Curriculum ==
St Aloysius College offers its senior students the Victorian Certificate of Education (VCE). The College is recognised for its academic excellence, with a renowned STEM program and the application of Stanford University's Design thinking program. Students at St Aloysius have the opportunity to study French, Japanese and Italian, and the College has sister schools in Geneva, Tokyo and Milan.

In 2021, St Aloysius College received The Age's Schools That Excel Award for the west.

Beyond the core curriculum, students have the option to take part in Creative and Performing Arts opportunities and initiatives, chess clubs and compete against students from other schools in the Debaters Association of Victoria (DAV) Competition.

== Sport ==
St Aloysius College is a member of the Association of Coeducational Schools (ACS), a weekly competition against other Catholic and Independent Coeducational schools in Melbourne. The College is a partner of the North Melbourne Football Club.

== Notable alumnae ==
- Lily D'Ambrosio, politician
- Moira Kelly, Humanitarian
- Debbie Lee, Athlete
