= Mentone Girls' Secondary College =

Mentone Girls' Secondary Colleges
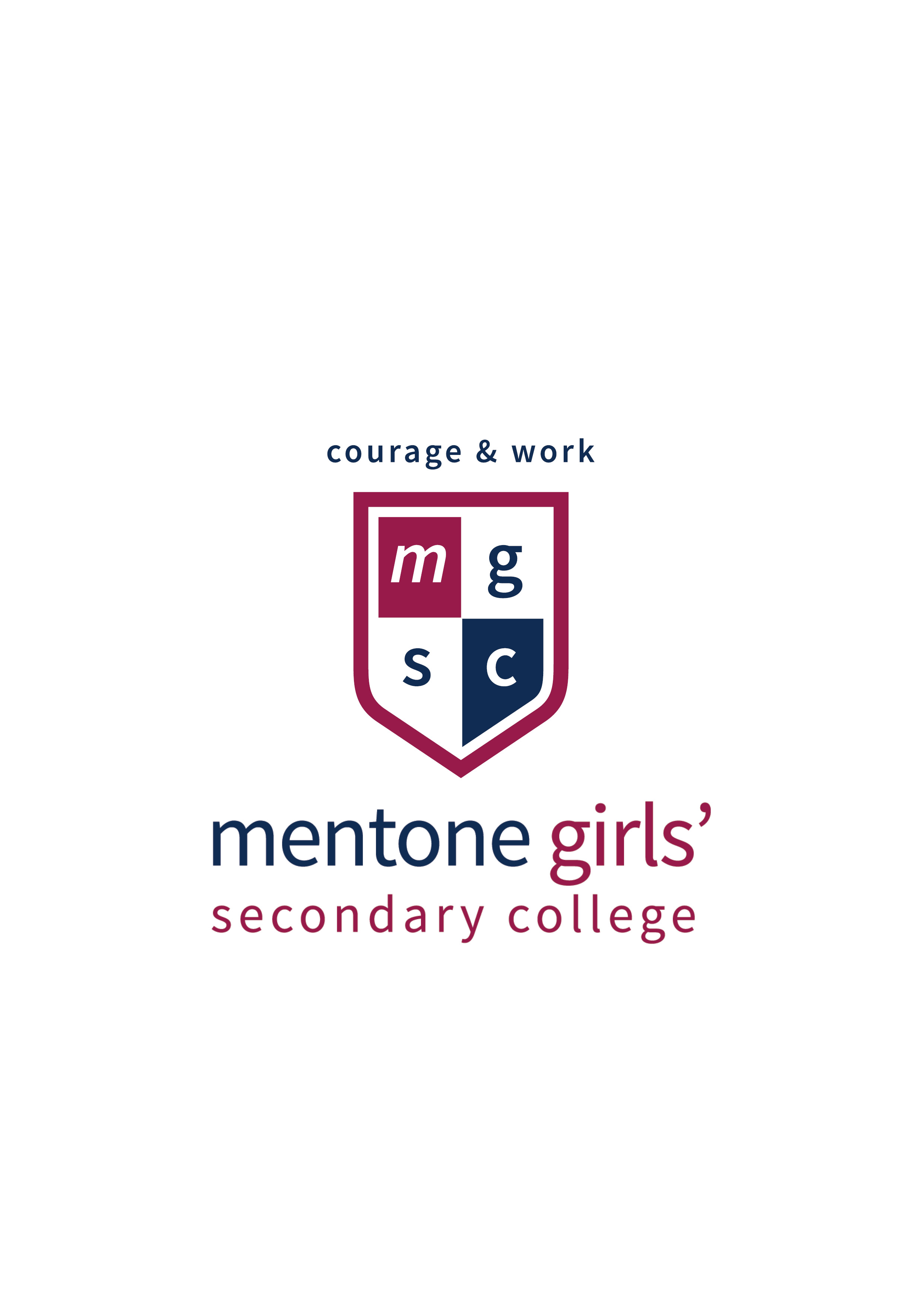

Location
- Mentone, Victoria, 3194; Australia; 37°58′51″S 145°3′14″E

Information
- Type: Public
- Motto: Virtute Et Labore (Courage and Work)
- Established: 1955
- Status: Open
- Principal: Linda Brown
- Staff: 94
- Years offered: Years 7 to 12
- Gender: Female
- Enrolment: 1100
- Houses: Jackson, Kenny, Mackellar, Melba
- Song: Virtute Et Labore
- Website: www.mgsc.vic.edu.au

Mentone Girls' Secondary College is a day, secondary school for girls located in Melbourne's southeast beachside suburb of Mentone, Victoria. Over 1100 students are enrolled throughout Years 7 to 12, with students transitioning to the college in Year 7 from over 50 primary schools throughout Victoria.

== Overview ==
Mentone Girls' Secondary College (often shortened to MGSC or Mentone Girls') is the only government girls school in the south-eastern suburbs of Melbourne, Victoria. It is located in the bayside suburb of Mentone, a short distance from the beaches of Port Phillip Bay. More than 1100 students are enrolled over six different year levels, beginning at Year 7 and finishing with Year 12. The College is known for its prominent Band Instrumental Music Program, as well as STEAM studies. The Victorian Certificate of Education (VCE) program is made available to all students in Years 11 and 12, with students in Year 10 also having the opportunity to study a VCE subject. In 2019, the Enhancement Program was introduced to encourage students wanting a greater challenge with their learning to push themselves. The grounds of the college are used by the Victorian School of Languages (VSL) for regular classes on Saturday mornings.

== History ==
Mentone Girls' High School was established in early 1955 as a way to encourage female students to continue with their schooling and eventually go on to tertiary studies. When the school was opened, it is estimated that around 60 Year 8 students were enrolled. Until the school's official opening on the 11th of October 1955, classes were held in local halls. The inaugural principal Nina Carr spent a decade establishing the school's infrastructure and educational foundations and forging her reputation as a pioneer in girls' secondary education. Living in a flat at the school, she tended the front garden and coordinated volunteer parents' working parties to improve the grounds. Carr left the school in 1965 after she was offered the role of principal of Mac.Robertson Girls' High School, then seen to be the most senior position available to a woman in the teaching service. The Nina Carr Centre, located on the grounds of Mentone Girls' Secondary College is named in her honour. The school was renamed in 1988, from Mentone Girls' High School to the now well known Mentone Girls' Secondary College.

== Principals ==
- 1955–1965: Nina Carr
- 1966–1969: Annie McLennan
- 1970–1972: Ruth Nicholds
- 1973–1974: Joan Addinsall (acting)
- 1975–1977: Gwen Northey
- 1978–1981: Noela Eury
- 1982: Peter Richardson (acting)
- 1983–1988: Michael Constable
- 1989–1996: Lesley Boston
- 1997–2016: Deborah Lehner
- 2016–present: Linda Brown

== Curriculum ==
The college is divided into three sub-schools: Junior (Years 7 and 8), Middle (Years 9 and 10), and Senior (Years 11 and 12). Year 11 and 12 students study subjects offered for the Victorian Certificate of Education (VCE), as well as Vocational Education & Training (VET) courses. During Year 10, students are allowed to undertake either a VCE or VET subject as part of their individualised curriculum. In both years 7 and 8, students are required to undertake one LOTE (Languages other than English) subject of either Japanese or French.

Due to the college's large population size, it enables a large offering of subjects. For the 2022 school year, the college will offer more than 25 different VCE subjects, including a wide range of humanities and science subjects.

From Years 7 to 9, a select-entry Enhancement Program is available as an option for students who wish to seek a greater challenge.

== Facilities ==
Located on the corner of Charman Road and Balcombe Road, the facilities of the college's sole campus include the following:

- Nina Carr Performing Arts Centre, containing a 500-seat theatre as well as music and drama rehearsal and practice rooms
- Junior Learning Centre
- VCE Centre
- Science Laboratories
- Library Resource Centre
- Multi-station Food Technology spaces
- Viewing Room
- Gymnasium, including two multi-use sports courts and a grandstand, as well as a Circuit Built Gym Room
- Tennis Courts
- Grass Oval with both AFL and Soccer Goals
- Synthetic Running Track
- STEAM Connect Centre, combining art and technology learning spaces with specialist rooms for visual arts, media studies, wood and metal technologies, and pottery kilns

== College Houses ==
Mentone Girls' Secondary College boasts four houses: Jackson House (Green), Kenny House (Blue), Melba House (Yellow), and Mackellar House (Purple). When enrolled at the college, students are assigned a House, which they will remain at for the entirety of their time at the college.

Houses regularly compete against one another at annual Performance, Athletics, Cross Country, and Swimming carnivals.

All four College Houses were named after prominent Australian women of history. Jackson House was named in celebration of Marjorie Jackson; Elizabeth Kenny is the namesake of Kenny House, Melba House is named after Dame Nellie Melba, and Dorothea Mackellar was the inspiration for Mackellar House.
