= Saint Ursula's College, Kingsgrove =

St Ursula's College Kingsgrove and Mary
- The College crest

Location
- Kingsgrove, southern Sydney, New South Wales; Australia; 33°56′28″S 151°06′12″E

Information
- Type: Independent single-sex secondary day school
- Motto: Latin: Serviam (I will Serve)
- Religious affiliation: Ursuline Order
- Denomination: Roman Catholic
- Patron saints: Saint Angela Merici and Saint Ursula
- Established: 1 February 1957; 69 years ago
- Educational authority: New South Wales Department of Education
- Oversight: Catholic Education Office, Archdiocese of Sydney
- Principal: Ms Vivienne Awad
- Teaching staff: 82.1 FTE
- Gender: Girls
- Enrolment: 1110 (2025)
- Campus type: Suburban
- Colours: Green, navy blue and white
- Website: stursulakingsgrove.syd.catholic.edu.au

St Ursula's College, Kingsgrove, founded in 1957, is an independent Roman Catholic single-sex secondary day school for girls, located in Kingsgrove, a southern suburb of Sydney, New South Wales, Australia. The College is a member of the Alliance of Girls' Schools Australasia.

Academically, St Ursula's College is consistently one of the best performing schools in the Archdiocese of Sydney. The College was ranked 103rd in the state in the 2025 NSW Higher School Certificate (HSC).

Vivienne Awad is the current Principal of St Ursula's College. She was appointed to the role in 2024.

== History ==
The Ursuline Order was founded by Saint Angela de Merici in Brescia, Italy in 1535. Saint Angela Merici named the order after Saint Ursula, patron saint of the Sorbonne in Paris and also the patron saint of education. The Ursuline Sisters came to the Kingsgrove Parish in 1949 when they were invited to take over St Bernadette's School at Bexley South from the Sisters of Mercy. The sisters lived at the convent at Ashbury and travelled to Bexley North each day.

Within a few years, they had established a convent at Caroline Street, Kingsgrove (the present St Ursula's College administration building), and in 1953 they opened a new school, Our Lady of Fatima Primary School.

St Ursula's College was opened in 1957 with an enrolment of 56 girls in first form. The following year, 52 new students came to the College and, by 1959, there were 200 students enrolled. The College has continued to grow, with a current enrolment of over 1,000 students, more than 80 teachers and 20 ancillary staff.

In 2018, and again in 2020, St Ursula's was ranked in the top 50 schools in New South Wales by HSC results.

In 2023, St Ursula's introduced the International Baccalaureate as a study path making it the first systemic Catholic school in Australia to give students the opportunity to study through the International Baccalaureate.

In December 2023, the school ended its ban on same-sex partners for LGBT+ students attending the school formal after a Change.org petition launched by a student against its “discriminatory policy” had reached 4,900 signatures. Federal education minister Jason Clare had urged the school to rethink the ban, saying students “should be able to take whoever they wanted” to the Year 12 farewell.

== See also ==
- List of Catholic schools in New South Wales
- Catholic education in Australia
