= Santa Maria College, Melbourne =

Santa Maria College

Location
- Northcote, Victoria; Northcote, Victoria, 3070; Australia
- Coordinates: 37°46′14″S 145°0′9″E

Information
- Type: Independent secondary school
- Motto: Latin: Quantum Potes Tantum Aude (Dare to do as much as you are able)
- Denomination: Roman Catholic; Sisters of the Good Samaritan
- Established: 1904
- Status: Open
- Principal: Joanne Rock
- Chaplain: Sr. Glenys
- Staff: around 100
- Grades: 7–12
- Gender: Girls
- Enrolment: Over 950
- Classrooms: About 84
- Houses: Conway; Carmel; Rosaria; Lourdes; Neville; Clare
- Colours: French navy and gold
- Song: Strong and Tall
- Website: santamaria.vic.edu.au

Santa Maria College is a Roman Catholic all-girls high school located in the inner-northern Melbourne suburb of Northcote, Victoria, Australia. Santa Maria was established in 1904 by the Sisters of the Good Samaritan of the Order of St Benedict, originally titled the Good Samaritan High School. As of 2017, the school caters for over 950 students.

In 2020 Santa Maria College announced the appointment of its new principal Joanne Rock, who has come from FCJ College Benalla, where she has been the principal for the last 5 years.

== Overview ==
The College is an IB (International Baccalaureate) School, offering the Middle Years Program to students in year 7–10, culminating in the completion of the MYP Personal Project. Italian and Japanese are both taught at the College as a part of the LOTE (Languages Other Than English) program.

Extra-curricular activities are a prominent aspect of school life at Santa Maria. The school's debating teams compete in both inter-house and DAV competitions representing the college in their respective divisions.

More than 15 different sports are offered to students throughout the year, including basketball, cross country (running), soccer, football, hockey, volleyball, netball, softball, swimming, diving, indoor cricket and super 8's. In addition to these activities, the College hosts an annual inter-house athletics and swimming carnival in which students compete to earn 'house points'.

School productions are also held annually, with musicals and plays on alternate years. The music program covers a variety of instruments and abilities, and includes vocal lessons.
