= List of schools in Victoria, Australia =

Below are lists of schools in Victoria, Australia:

- List of government schools in Victoria, Australia
- List of non-government schools in Victoria, Australia

== Largest Victorian schools ==
Based on enrolment size, this is a list of 39 of the largest schools in Victoria, Australia.

No.	School	Student enrolment	No. of campuses	Campus locations	School type	Founded
1.	Virtual School Victoria	6,600	1	Thornbury	Government	1909
2.	Haileybury College	4,880	4	Keysborough, Brighton, Berwick and Melbourne	Independent	1892
3.	Bacchus Marsh Grammar School	3,826	3	Bacchus Marsh, Aintree (Woodlea), Staughton Vale	Independent	1988
4.	Caulfield Grammar School	3,555	4	Wheelers Hill, Malvern, Caulfield and Yarra Junction	Independent	1881
5.	Alamanda K–9 College	3,335	1	Point Cook	Government	2013
6.	Sirius College	3,282	6	Keysborough, Sunshine, Dallas, Shepparton, Broadmeadows, Meadow Fair	Independent	1997
7.	Wesley College, Melbourne	3,181	3	Elsternwick, Glen Waverley and Melbourne	Independent	1866
8.	McKinnon Secondary College	3,052	2	McKinnon, Bentleigh East	Government	1955
9.	Hume Anglican Grammar	2,948	3	Mickleham, Donnybrook, Kalkallo	Independent	2008
10.	Minaret College	2,929	3	Springvale, Doveton, Officer	Independent	1992
11.	Ilim College	2,868	5	Dallas, Kiewa, Glenroy, Doveton	Independent	1995
12.	St. Francis Xavier College	3,600	3	Berwick, Officer and Beaconsfield	Catholic	1978
13.	Carey Baptist Grammar School	2,564	5	Kew, Donvale, Bulleen and Banksia Peninsula	Independent	1923
14.	Padua College	2,534	3	Mornington, Rosebud and Tyabb	Catholic	1898
15.	Emmanuel College	2,533	2	Altona North and Point Cook	Catholic	1965
16.	Ivanhoe Grammar School	2,500	3	Ivanhoe and Mernda	Independent	1915
17.	Glen Waverley Secondary College	2,417	1	Glen Waverley	Government	1960
18.	Kambrya College	2,369	1	Berwick	Government	2002
19.	East Doncaster Secondary College	2,211	1	Doncaster East	Government	1974
20.	Keysborough Secondary College	2,194	2	Keysborough and Springvale South	Government	2008
21.	St Monica's College	2,185	2	Epping	Catholic	1964
22.	Overnewton Anglican Community College	2,146	2	Keilor and Taylors Lakes	Independent	1987
23.	Hazel Glen College	2,141	1	Doreen	Government	
24.	St Kevin's College	2,087	5	Toorak (Heyington), Toorak (Glendalough), Toorak (St. Peter's ELC), Richmond and Tooronga.	Catholic	1918
25.	Alkira Secondary College	2,011	1	Cranbourne North	Government	2009
26.	Parade College	1,968	2	Preston, Bundoora	Catholic	1871
27.	Frankston High School	1,964	2	Frankston South	Government	1924
28.	Scotch College	1,957	4	Hawthorn, Healesville, Phillip Island, Mansfield	Independent	1851
29.	Truganina P-9 College	1,933	1	Truganina	Government	
30.	Kardinia International College	1,925	2	Geelong	Independent	1996
31	The Grange P-12 College	1,919	2	Hoppers Crossing	Government	1993
32	Melbourne Grammar School	1,905	2	Caulfield, South Yarra	Anglican	1849
33	Rowville Secondary College	1,887	2	Rowville	Government	1990
34	Mount Waverley Secondary College	1,862	2	Mount Waverley	Government	1964
35	Northcote High School	1,668	1	Northcote	Government	1926
36.	Aquinas College	1,659	1	Heathmont	Catholic	1961
37.	Berwick Secondary College	1,626	1	Berwick	Government	1977
38.	Elisabeth Murdoch College	1,572	1	Langwarrin	Government	1984
39.	Xavier College	1,503	2	Kew	Independent	1878

== Largest Victorian government primary schools ==
Based on enrolment size, this is a list of 17 of the largest government primary schools in Victoria, Australia.

No.	School	Student enrolment	No. of campuses	Campus locations	School type	Founded
1.	Virtual School Victoria	6,600	1	Thornbury	Government	1909
2.	Alamanda K-9 College	3,335	1	Point Cook	Government	2013
3.	Tulliallan Primary School	1,449	1	Cranbourne North	Government	2017
4.	Ramlegh Primary School	1,385	1	Clyde North	Government	2021
5.	Serpell Primary School	1,231	1	Templestowe	Government	1978
6.	Featherbrook P-9 College	1,224	1	Point Cook	Government	2017
7.	Wilandra Rise Primary School	1,139	1	Clyde North	Government	2017
8.	Barton Primary School	1,092	1	Cranbourne West	Government	2017
9.	Casey Fields Primary School	1,043	1	Cranbourne East	Government	2020
10.	Oakleigh South Primary School	1,038	1	Oakleigh South	Government	1958
11.	Brentwood Park Primary School	1,017	1	Berwick	Government	1995
12.	Cranbourne East Primary School	999	1	Cranbourne East	Government	2011
13.	John Henry Primary School	981	1	Pakenham	Government	2017
14.	Glen Waverley Primary School	970	1	Glen Waverley	Government	1994
15.	Pinewood Primary School	950	1	Mount Waverley	Government	1961
16.	Mount View Primary School	920	1	Glen Waverley	Government	1965
17.	North Melbourne Primary School	910	2	North Melbourne	Government	1874

== See also ==
- List of schools in Australia
- List of high schools in Victoria
