= Head of the Schoolgirls (Victoria) =

Regatta for girls at schools from Victoria, Australia

- Status: Active
- Frequency: Annually
- Venue: Barwon River
- Location: Geelong
- Coordinates: 38°09′51″S 144°20′36″E
- Country: Australia
- Inaugurated: 1985
- Most recent: 20 March 2022

The Victorian Head of the Schoolgirls regatta is contested between girls at schools from all across the state of Victoria Australia. Schools from the Girls Sport Victoria (GSV) and also Associated Public Schools of Victoria (APS), as well as smaller school rowing groups which enter under a rowing club banner, compete in a range of events over 1000m for the Year 9 and Year 10 events or 1500m for the Open events (typically girls in years 11 and 12).

Whereas in most rowing, coxswains can be of either sex, in the HOSG all coxswains must be female and attend the same school as the rowers of the crew that they are coxing.

The racing is usually held over an entire weekend (Friday, Saturday & Sunday) in mid-March on the Barwon River in Geelong. In 2022 the regatta was held on the third weekend of March, with all event heats on Friday the 18th, all repechages, all quarter-finals (for events with over 16 entries) and most semi-finals (for events with 16 entries or less) on Saturday the 19th and remaining semi-finals (for events with over 16 entries) and all finals on Sunday the 20th.

Head of the Schoolgirls is the largest single sex regatta in the southern hemisphere, with races starting every 3 minutes over the 3 days. In 2021, over 2100 girls participated in 51 events. In order to keep the regatta within a reasonable time frame and prevent large schools inundating the divisions of the smaller boats (e.g. single sculls), girls are only permitted to race in one event over the weekend.

== History ==
The first girl to row within the A.P.S. was a lone sculler from Geelong Grammar in 1972. There were 32 girls rowing by 1975, and in 1981, girls began competing at the Senior Regatta with Geelong Grammar, Geelong College, Melbourne Girls Grammar, Morongo Girls' College and Lauriston racing in 1st and 2nd Fours over 800m. Methodist Ladies' College, and Carey joined in 1982, with Carey boating a First Four in 1983.

1984 was the final year that non APS school girls participated in the APS Head of the River, with seven girls' crews rowing in the 1st, 2nd and 3rd Four events. The following year saw the regatta revert to an all APS event, with only Geelong Grammar and Geelong College boating a First Four. Carey reappeared in the First Fours in 1986, the same year that Wesley joined, and with Caulfield joining in 1987, all five co-educational schools were boating a first four over 1500m. Around this time, the Principal of the Morongo Girls' College initiated a meeting that established the Head of School Girls' Regatta (HOSG).

=== 1984 ===
Last year of schoolgirl participation in APS Head of the River. Principal of Morongo initiates meeting that establishes the HOSG Regatta.

=== 1985 ===
MLC host first HOSG in Ballarat - The Regatta consisted of Heats and Finals for 7 events in which 16 schools and 240 girls competed during a single day. There is no record of the number of spectators who attended. A strong cross wind at Ballarat made conditions very interesting for crews and officials.

=== 1986 ===
Ballarat Grammar and local schools host HOSG - 9 events.

=== 1987 ===
Wesley College host HOSG in Geelong - 9 events

=== 1988 ===
Lauriston host HOSG - 12 events

=== 1989 ===
Loreto Mandeville Hall host HOSG - 13 events

=== 1990 ===
MLC host HOSG - 14 events including Eights for first time

=== 1991 ===
MGGS host HOSG - 14 events. HOSG Regatta Committee incorporates as an Association.

=== 1992 ===
Morongo host HOSG - 18 events. For the first time, the regatta is held over 2 days.

=== 1993 ===
Genazzano host HOSG - 22 events including Quad Sculls for first time. Timing system introduced.

=== 1994 ===
St Catherine's host HOSG - 24 events.

=== 1995 ===
Lauriston host HOSG - 26 events.

=== 1996 ===
Carey Grammar host HOSG - 27 events, 38 schools and 1275 competitors

=== 1997 ===
Loreto Mandeville Hall host HOSG - 28 events. Active For Life becomes Sponsor of HOSG Regatta.

=== 1998 ===
Sacred Heart College host HOSG - 31 events.

=== 1999 ===
Firbank host HOSG - 34 events.

=== 2000 ===
MLC host HOSG - 34 events, 41 schools and 1474 competitors. Sykes Racing becomes naming rights sponsor of HOSG Regatta.

=== 2001 ===
Melbourne Girls Grammar again host the regatta - 34 Events. Professional Event Managers, SSDF, appointed by the host school. City of Greater Geelong provides support for temporary infrastructure costs at this Major Event.

=== 2002 ===
The committee hosts the regatta, replacing the Host School arrangement. SSDF is again the Event Manager, with the Geelong Rowing Association assuming a significant support role. a Long-term agreement is entered into between Head of the Schoolgirls Regatta Committee, the City of Greater Geelong, and the Corangamite Catchment Management Authority to maintain the regatta at Geelong.

=== 2005 ===
The 371 crews with their associated 2009 athletes came from 41 Victorian schools. Entries varied from a lone sculler and coach to 195 participants from a large girls' school. There were 28 fastest times recorded during the two days racing. For the first time Rowing Victoria carried out the dual role of providing the officials and being the Event Manager.

=== 2007 ===
On the realigned Barwon River course the increased use of repechage for 1500m crews was a great success and the new Judges' Box proved its worth . There was a noticeable increase in single scull entries.

=== 2008 ===
New Events to the program were the senior third eight.

=== 2009 ===
New Events to the program were the year 9 and 10 division five quad sculls.

=== 2013 ===
New Events to the program were the year 9 and 10 division six quad sculls.

=== 2014 ===
New Events to the program were the year 9 and 10 division seven quad sculls. This year was also the last year the regatta was held purely on the Saturday and Sunday.

=== 2015 ===
Changes to the regatta format included moving the Open (Years 11 & 12) event heats to Friday afternoon

=== 2016 ===
Changes to the regatta format included the introduction of exhaustive finals for Open events.

=== 2017 ===
New Events to the program were the Open Double Scull and Year 9 division eight quad scull. Changes to the regatta format included the introduction of exhaustive finals for Year 10 events.

=== 2018 ===
According to the 2018 HOSG regatta Bulletin, the regatta format was updated to provide for exhaustive finals for all crews, at all year levels. If necessary, the addition of a fifth round of racing (heats-repechages-qtr finals-semis-finals) was added to the program to a number of events with more than 16 competitors. The open 8 division 4 was also added to the program for the first time. Unfortunately due to extremely windy conditions, the finals day of racing on Sunday was largely cancelled. No A Final races were rowed in the 2018 edition, with all racing being cancelled after just five year 9 Coxed Quad scull minor finals had been held. The HOSG committee subsequently provided a specially minted a special 2018 A Finalist Medal for all members of crews who achieved that position.

=== 2019 ===
The 2019 edition of the HOSG regatta was the first to hold the exhaustive finals for all divisions and all boat classes of all year levels. There were 473 races over three days including 151 races on the Sunday, finals day. Over 2100 athletes competed, in 48 events, making it one of the largest HOSG entry fields.

=== 2020 ===
New Events to the program were the Year 10 division 1 eight and Year 10 Double Scull. The regatta was cancelled following the end of racing on Friday 13 March 2020 due to the Coronavirus (COVID-19) pandemic.

=== 2021 ===
New Events to the program were the Year 9 division 9 coxed quad scull. Changes were made to the regatta format due to the ongoing Coronavirus (COVID-19) pandemic such as limiting spectator numbers to 1,800 people and restricting access to the North Bank to athletes, coaches and school staff only.

=== 2022 ===
No New Events were added to the program. The Coronavirus (COVID-19) pandemic was becoming normalised resulting in the 2021 restrictions being lifted.

== Location ==
The first HOSG was held in 1985 at Ballarat with seven events, and 240 competitors from 16 schools. In 1987, the event moved to Geelong where it has been held each year since.

In 2018, the HOSG organizing committee awarded the rights to hold the regatta in Geelong for a further 5-year period from 2020 to 2024 inclusive.

== Management ==
Each year a different school would host the regatta, but as it grew in size and popularity (from 9 events in 1987 to 321 crews and 2009 competitors in 2005), the Head of the Schoolgirl Regatta Committee decided to contract the event management and official duties. 2005 was the inaugural year in which Rowing Victoria conducted the regatta on behalf of the HOSG regatta committee. Throughout the history of the regatta, the boat racing officials have been through Rowing Victoria.

== Events ==
Racing at the Head of the Schoolgirls is in Eights, Coxed Quad Sculls, Coxed Fours, Double Sculls and Single Sculls across multiple divisions and year levels. Additional divisions have been added over the years to accommodate the increased popularity of schoolgirl rowing. As of 2021 the regatta offers the following:

=== Year 9 (1000m) ===
Coxed Quad Scull (10 Divisions); Coxed Four (8 Divisions); Single Scull (1 Division)

=== Year 10 (1000m) ===
Eight (1 Division); Coxed Quad Scull (7 Divisions); Coxed Four (6 Divisions); Double Scull (1 Division); Single Scull (1 Division)

=== Open (1500m) ===
Eight (4 Divisions); Coxed Quad Scull (5 Divisions); Coxed Four (5 Divisions); Double Scull (1 Division); Single Scull (1 Division)

== Morongo Medals ==
Those girls who have competed in the Head of the Schoolgirls Regatta for three or more years, and are in Year 12, are eligible to receive a Morongo Medal. These medals have been struck to commemorate Morongo Girls' College's contribution to the HOSG as a competitor before closing and to recognize its supporters' club, the Chirnside Club, as a valued contributor to the Schoolgirls. The medal's inscription - "Sint lucernae ardentes" is translated as "Keep the lamp burning".

== Results ==
=== Female School Eight Open Div 1 ===
FSCH8+O1
Year	Winner	2nd	3rd
1990	Wesley College		
1991	MLC		
1992	Genazzano		
1993	Lauriston		
1994	Geelong Grammar		
1995	Geelong Grammar		
1996	Geelong Grammar		
1997	Geelong Grammar		
1998	Geelong Grammar		
1999	Geelong Grammar		
2000	Geelong Grammar		
2001	Geelong Grammar		
2002	Geelong College	Geelong Grammar	Melbourne Girls Grammar
2003	Geelong College	Geelong Grammar	MLC
2004	Geelong College	St Catherine's	Carey
2005	MLC	Geelong Grammar	Melbourne Girls Grammar
2006	MLC	Geelong College	Melbourne Girls Grammar
2007	MLC	Geelong Grammar	Geelong College
2008	MLC	St Catherine's	Geelong Grammar
2009	Geelong Grammar	St Catherine's	MLC
2010	MLC	Geelong College	Geelong Grammar
2011	Melbourne Girls Grammar	Genazzano	MLC
2012	Melbourne Girls Grammar	MLC	Genazzano
2013	Genazzano	MLC	Melbourne Girls Grammar
2014	MLC	Loreto Toorak	Melbourne Girls Grammar
2015	Geelong Grammar	Loreto Toorak	MLC
2016	Geelong Grammar	Loreto Toorak	St Catherine's
2017	MLC	Firbank	Loreto Toorak
2018	CANCELLED	CANCELLED	CANCELLED
2019	MLC	Geelong College	St Catherine's
2020	CANCELLED	CANCELLED	CANCELLED
2021	St Catherine's	Melbourne Girls Grammar	MLC
2022	St Catherine's	Melbourne Girls Grammar	Loreto Toorak
2023	Loreto Toorak	Melbourne Girls Grammar	St Catherine's
2024	Loreto Toorak	Melbourne Girls Grammar	Firbank
2025	St Catherine's	Melbourne Girls Grammar	Geelong Grammar

=== Female School Coxed Quad Scull Open Div 1 ===
FSCH4X+O1
Year	Winner	2nd	3rd
1993	Genazzano		
1994	Genazzano		
1995	Genazzano		
1996	MLC		
1997	MLC		
1998	MLC		
1999	Genazzano		
2000	Sacred Heart		
2001	Sacred Heart		
2002	MLC	Loreto Toorak	Firbank
2003	Loreto Toorak	Firbank	Sacred Heart
2004	Firbank	Sacred Heart	Ruyton
2005	Sacred Heart	Firbank	Loreto Toorak
2006	Firbank	Loreto Toorak	Genazzano
2007	Firbank	Genazzano	Sacred Heart
2008	Genazzano	Sacred Heart	Loreto Toorak
2009	Genazzano	Sacred Heart	Gippsland Grammar
2010	Gippsland Grammar	Sacred Heart	Ruyton
2011	Sacred Heart	Loreto Toorak	Ruyton
2012	Loreto Toorak	Sacred Heart	Ruyton
2013	Firbank	Ruyton	Korowa
2014	Firbank	Korowa	Ruyton
2015	Ruyton	Strathcona	Firbank
2016	Ruyton	Strathcona	Sacred Heart
2017	Ruyton	Sacred Heart	Korowa
2018	CANCELLED	CANCELLED	CANCELLED
2019	Ruyton	Strathcona	Korowa
2020	CANCELLED	CANCELLED	CANCELLED
2021	Ruyton	Melbourne Girls' College	Strathcona
2022	Strathcona	Melbourne Girls' College	Kardinia
2023	Ruyton		
2024	Gippsland Grammar		
2025	Gippsland Grammar	Strathcona	Albert Park

=== Female School Four Open Div 1 ===
FSCH4+O1
Year	Winner	2nd	3rd
1985	MLC		
1986	Geelong Grammar		
1987	Wesley College		
1988	Geelong Grammar		
1989	Morongo		
1990	Geelong Grammar		
1991	Geelong Grammar		
1992	Geelong College		
1993	Lauriston		
1994	Lauriston		
1995	Lauriston		
1996	Geelong Grammar		
1997	Geelong Grammar		
1998	Lauriston		
1999	MLC		
2000	Lauriston		
2001	Ballarat Grammar		
2002	Ballarat Grammar	Ballarat & Clarendon	Ballarat High
2003	Ballarat Grammar	Lauriston	Ballarat & Clarendon
2004	Ballarat Grammar	Lauriston	Ballarat High
2005	Ballarat Grammar	Ballarat & Clarendon	Ballarat High
2006	Ballarat Grammar	Korowa	Lauriston
2007	Ballarat Grammar	Korowa	Toorak
2008	Ballarat & Clarendon	Ballarat Grammar	Kardinia
2009	Lauriston	Ballarat Grammar	Ballarat & Clarendon
2010	Lauriston	Ballarat & Clarendon	Toorak
2011	Lauriston	Ballarat Grammar	PLC
2012	Ballarat Grammar	Melbourne Girls' College	Shelford
2013	Lauriston	Ballarat Grammar	Ballarat & Clarendon
2014	Ballarat & Clarendon	Ballarat Grammar	Lauriston
2015	Melbourne Girls' College	Ballarat & Clarendon	Kardinia
2016	Ballarat Grammar	Lauriston	Ballarat High
2017	Loreto Ballarat	Melbourne Girls' College	Damascus
2018	CANCELLED	CANCELLED	CANCELLED
2019	Ballarat Grammar	Loreto Ballarat	Ballarat & Clarendon
2020	CANCELLED	CANCELLED	CANCELLED
2021	Ballarat & Clarendon	Ballarat Grammar	Loreto Ballarat
2022	Ballarat & Clarendon	Loreto Ballarat	Shelford
2023	Ballarat & Clarendon		
2024	Ballarat & Clarendon		
2025	Loreto Ballarat	Genazzano	Ballarat Grammar

=== Female School Double Scull Open Div 1 ===
FSCH2XO1
Year	Winner	2nd	3rd
2017	Maribyrnong	Ruyton	Fintona
2018	CANCELLED	CANCELLED	CANCELLED
2019	Genazzano	Monivae College	Canterbury
2020	CANCELLED	CANCELLED	CANCELLED
2021	Mercy College	Ruyton	Sacred Heart
2022	Albert Park College	Gippsland Grammar	Xavier High School
2023	Albert Park College		
2024	Albert Park College		
2025	The Scots School		

=== Female School Single Scull Open Div 1 ===
FSCH1XO1
Year	Winner	2nd	3rd
1985	Ballarat High		
1986	Ballarat High		
1987			
1988	Lowther Hall		
1989	Korowa		
1990	Lauriston		
1991	Loreto Toorak		
1992	Lauriston		
1993	Fintona		
1994	Toorak		
1995	Firbank		
1996	Gippsland Grammar		
1997	Matthew Flinders		
1998	Strathmore Secondary College		
1999	Strathmore Secondary College		
2000	Geelong High		
2001	Canterbury		
2002	Canterbury	Melbourne Girls Grammar	Wesley College
2003	Lowther Hall	MLC	Melbourne Girls' College
2004	Brighton Secondary	Firbank	Kardinia
2005	MLC	Geelong High	St Columba's
2006	Melbourne Girls' College	Star	MLC
2007	Melbourne Girls' College	Melbourne Girls' College	Pascoe Vale
2008	Melbourne Girls' College	Melbourne Girls' College	MLC
2009	Caulfield Grammar	MLC	St Columba's
2010	Mentone Girls' School	St Columba's	Emmanuel College
2011	Melbourne Girls' College	Wesley College	St Columba's
2012	Melbourne Girls' College	Clonard College	St Columba's
2013	St Columba's	Pascoe Vale	Christian College
2014	Sacred Heart, Yarrawonga	CAE Melbourne	Melbourne Girls' College
2015	Lowther Hall	Melbourne Girls' College	Corowa High School
2016	Kardinia	Melbourne Girls' College	Firbank
2017	Melbourne Girls' College	Gippsland Grammar	Brighton Secondary College
2018	CANCELLED	CANCELLED	CANCELLED
2019	Maribyrnong College	Star	Gippsland Grammar
2020	CANCELLED	CANCELLED	CANCELLED
2021	Kardinia	Korowa	Maribyrnong College
2022	Geelong College	Seda College	Maribyrnong College
2023	SEDA College		
2024	Haileybury		
2025	Korowa	Ruyton	Kardinia

=== Overall ===
The school that has the highest medal tally for the regatta is deemed to be the Head of the Schoolgirls Champions. While no trophy is awarded for this feat, it is a source of great pride for the recipient school.

HOSG Champions
Year	Winner	2nd	3rd
2002	MLC	Melbourne Girls Grammar	St Catherine's
2003	MLC	St Catherine's	Carey
2004	MLC	Genazzano	Carey
2005	MLC	Melbourne Girls Grammar	Firbank
2006	MLC	Genazzano	Carey
2007	MLC	Genazzano	Loreto Toorak
2008	MLC	Genazzano	Melbourne Girls Grammar
2009	MLC	Loreto Toorak	Genazzano
2010	Genazzano	MLC	Lauriston
2011	Genazzano	Loreto Toorak	Melbourne Girls' College
2012	Loreto Toorak	Carey	MLC
2013	Loreto Toorak	Carey	Genazzano
2014	Carey	Firbank	MLC
2015	MLC	Loreto Toorak	Melbourne Girls' College
2016	Loreto Toorak	MLC	Firbank
2017	MLC	Loreto Toorak	St Catherine's
2018	CANCELLED	CANCELLED	CANCELLED
2019	Loreto Toorak	Loreto Ballarat	MLC
2020	CANCELLED	CANCELLED	CANCELLED
2021	Loreto Toorak	Loreto Ballarat	MLC
2022	MLC	Loreto Toorak	Melbourne Girls Grammar

== See also ==
- Head of the River (Victoria)
- Associated Public Schools of Victoria
- Girls Sport Victoria (GSV)
- Head of the River (Australia)
