= Head of the River (Victoria) =

Inter-school rowing event in Victoria, Australia

Head of the River 2001 at Nagambie

The Victorian Head of the River regatta is contested between the eleven Associated Public Schools of Victoria (APS).

The Head of the River is the oldest continuous schoolboy rowing event in the world, dating back to 1868, and throughout its history has changed format on a number of occasions: from a duel-style race between Melbourne Grammar and Scotch College on the Yarra River in Melbourne, to the current regatta, with the race usually being the last of the official APS rowing season. The race has been rowed on Lake Nagambie since 2001, which is a full-buoyed international standard course allowing six-boat finals.

School	School colours	Oar colours
Brighton Grammar School		
Carey Baptist Grammar School		
Caulfield Grammar School		
The Geelong College		
Geelong Grammar School		
Haileybury		
Melbourne Grammar School		
St Kevin's College		
Scotch College		
Wesley College		
Xavier College		

== History ==
A Brief History (The author acknowledges the many sources from which these comments arise. See below.)

The "Head of the River" is a classic event and is one of the premier events in Victorian rowing.

The first Public School boat race in Victoria was rowed downstream on the Upper Yarra on 18 June 1868. The race was the outcome of negotiations between two Melbourne University Boat Club members: J. H. Thompson, on behalf of Melbourne Grammar School, and J. C. Johnstone, a member of the Scotch College staff. Those gentlemen coached their respective crews. Crews had been rowing on the river for some time, but the challenge for the race issued by one of the Scotch College rowers was only made on 17 June. It was promptly accepted by Melbourne Grammar School and, even in those early days, the contest aroused substantial interest.

The challenge read as follows:

SCOTCH COLLEGE

Eastern Hill, Melbourne. 17th June, 1868.

Dear Sir,

I am requested by the Scotch College Rowing Club to challenge you to a friendly four-oar gig race the race to be rowed on Thursday the 18th from the Botanical Bridge to Edwards' boat house, and subject to such conditions as the crews agree to.

I am, Yours truly, JOHN C. FIELD

The result was a victory for Scotch College by a length. The names of the crews were as follows :

Scotch College. Bow: A. C. Wilson, 2: A. Smith, 3: John C. Field, Str: J. Brady, Cox: F. G. White, Cch: J Johnstone.

Melbourne Grammar School. Bow: J. Sweeney, 2: G. T. Teague, 3: W. Barker, Str: H. Ryan, Cox: H. M. Strachan, Cch: J H Thompson.

(J.C. Robinson, in a letter to The Argus on 15 May 1918, maintained that there had been an earlier race in 1859, but that claim was denied in The Argus of 18 May 1918, by J Henning Thompson, whom Robinson had named as being a member of the 1859 Melbourne Grammar crew.)

The race for "Head-of-the-River" has been rowed every year since 1868. Wesley College wanted to row against the other two schools in 1871 in the annual race. However, it was decided that, "as it was an old-established race, which it was a pity to disturb", Scotch College and the Grammar School should row against Wesley College in turn. The races were on 19 and 20 June 1871. Wesley College proved their mettle by beating the Scotch boys on the 20th, after being beaten in a hard race by Melbourne Grammar the previous afternoon. Wesley College boys soon took part regularly in the race with the other two, and were "Head-of-the-River" in 1874.

The races were rowed from 1868–1897 in string-test gigs with fixed seats. During the period 1898–1900, the race was competed for in best boat outrigger fours with sliding seats. From 1901, clinker outrigged eights with sliding seats were used. At various times later, cedar boats, followed by plywood boats, fiberglass and, finally, composite construction boats have been used.

In 1879, the race was first rowed on the Barwon River, and then in every fifth or sixth year until 1916. Between 1921–1943, the Barwon saw the contest every fourth year and, since 1948, the only use of the Yarra was in 1957 when Geelong College won. During World War II, the Geelong schools rowed a heat on the Barwon, while the four Melbourne Schools rowed heats on the Yarra. Those races were held after school, and the winners met on the Yarra to decide the title, except in 1943, when restrictions on travel were in force.

Scotch College has been represented every year. Gradually, other schools have joined the contest, with the most recent being Haileybury College, who entered the Boys First Eight event for the first time in 1991.

The Sumner Challenge Cup and the Fairbairn Challenge Cup are the two trophies connected with this great contest. The Sumner Challenge Cup was presented in 1875 by the Hon. T. J. Sumner, to become the property of the school which first won it three times. Scotch won it in 1875, 1876 and 1879, and have retained the cup since that date. At a meeting of delegates, held at Scotch College on 1 April 1911, it was unanimously decided to accept the Challenge Cup which was offered by Charles Fairbairn, of "Banongil", Skipton, to be held from year to year by the School which was Head of the River.

The Head of the River races have weathered such difficulties as flooded rivers, disputes over ages, dead heats, disqualifications, and even the inability of a school to round up enough rowers to boat a crew.

Before World War II, only the first crew of each school took part in the Head of the River Regatta, but there was a race for second crews and sometimes third crews raced on the Saturday prior to the Head of the River race.

In the early part of the 20th century the race was held in October, but later it was moved to May and, after World War II, to April. When the race was held in October, it was possible for a boy to represent his school in football, cricket, rowing and athletics in the one year, as the latter competition was held in May after the cricket season had ended.

== Schoolgirl Participation at the Head of the River ==
The first girl to row within the A.P.S. was a lone sculler from Geelong Grammar School in 1972. There were 32 girls rowing by 1975, and in 1981, girls began competing at the Senior Regatta with Geelong Grammar School, The Geelong College, Melbourne Girls Grammar School, Morongo Girls' School and Lauriston Girls' School racing in 1st and 2nd Fours over 800m. Methodist Ladies' College and Carey Baptist Grammar School joined in 1982, with Carey boating a First Four in 1983.

1984 was the final year school girls from schools outside of the APS participated in the APS Head of the River, with seven girls' crews rowing in the 1st, 2nd and 3rd Four events. The following year saw the regatta revert to an all APS event, with only the girls who attended the co-educational schools within the APS allowed to compete. This had only Geelong Grammar and Geelong College boating a First Four. Carey reappeared in the First Fours in 1986, the same year that Wesley College joined, and with Caulfield joining in 1987, all five co-educational schools were boating a first four over 1500m. Around this time, the Principal of the now-defunct Morongo Girls' School initiated a meeting that established the Head of School Girls' Regatta (HOSG). This regatta allowed any school with girls to put forward schoolgirl (exclusive) crews. This meant that all secondary schools that taught girls in Victoria had the chance to enter a competitive event, since they were now not able to compete at the APS Head of the River (unless they attended one of the co-educational APS Schools). The co-educational schools in the APS were still (and continue to be) allowed to enter boats at the Head of the Schoolgirls Regatta.

For the male students of the APS Schools in Victoria, the Head of the River regatta is their main Victorian regatta, whereas female students of the APS Schools of Victoria split their focus between the Head of the Schoolgirls Regatta and the Head of the River Regatta. However, the Head of the Schoolgirls Regatta is the pinnacle for Schoolgirl Rowing in Victoria as it features a larger range of competitors including non-APS Schools such as Firbank Grammar School, Genazzano FCJ College, Loreto Toorak, Melbourne Girls' Grammar School, Methodist Ladies College and St Catherine's School. While Geelong Grammar School has often shown strong results at both regattas, on average the Schoolgirl Senior Eight divisions at the Head of the Schoolgirls Regatta tend to be dominated by non-APS schools. It is interesting to note that Senior crews at the Head of the Schoolgirls Regatta compete over 1500m (limited by the length of the Barwon River in Geelong), compared to 2000m at the Head of the River Regatta.

Haileybury College began admitting girls in 2007 (who began rowing in the same year) resulting in the Head of the River for girls being contested by six of the eleven APS Schools.

== Results ==
=== Head of the River (Boys) ===
The 1st VIII is also known as the "Fairbairn Cup". This race is the actual "Head of the River" for the boys.

Winners by Year
Year	Winner	2nd	3rd	4th	5th	6th	Time	Margin
1868	Scotch	Melbourne						1 length
1869	Scotch	Melbourne					8:30.0	2 feet (0.61 m)
1870	Melbourne	Scotch					8:14.0	4 lengths
1871	Melbourne	Wesley College	Scotch					5 feet (1.5 m)
1872	Scotch	Melbourne	Wesley College					4 lengths
1873	Scotch	Wesley College						3 lengths
1874	Wesley College	Scotch						6 lengths
1875	Scotch	Wesley College						1 length
1876	Scotch	Geelong Grammar						3 lengths
1877	Melbourne	Scotch	Geelong Grammar					4 lengths
1878	Geelong Grammar	Melbourne						6 lengths
1879	Scotch	Geelong Grammar						5 lengths
1880	Geelong Grammar	Wesley College						2 1/2 lengths
1881	Scotch	Wesley College						3 lengths
1882	Geelong Grammar	Scotch						¾ length
1883	Melbourne	Scotch					9:10.0	1 1/2 lengths
1884	Scotch	Melbourne						2 1/2 lengths
1885	Geelong Grammar	Melbourne						1 1/2 lengths
1886	Geelong Grammar	Melbourne					8:30.5	1 1/2 lengths
1887	Geelong Grammar	Wesley College						2 lengths
1888	Geelong Grammar	Scotch						200 yards
1889	Geelong Grammar	Melbourne	Scotch	Wesley College			9:05.0	¾ length
1890	Geelong Grammar	Scotch						3 lengths
1891	Scotch	Wesley College	Geelong Grammar				7:30.0	3 1/2 feet (1.1 m)
1892	Scotch	Melbourne	Geelong Grammar					1 length
1893	Geelong Grammar	Melbourne	Scotch					3 lengths
1894	Geelong Grammar	Melbourne						2 lengths
1895	Geelong Grammar	Scotch	Melbourne					2 lengths
1896	Wesley College	Geelong Grammar						¾ length
1897	Melbourne	Geelong Grammar	Scotch					1/2 length
1898	Geelong Grammar	Melbourne						3 lengths
1899	Scotch	Melbourne	Wesley College					1 1/2 lengths
1900	Scotch	Wesley College	Melbourne					4 lengths
1901	Wesley College	Scotch	Geelong Grammar					1 1/2 lengths
1902	Wesley College	Melbourne	Geelong Grammar					1 lengths
1903	Wesley College	Scotch						4 lengths
1904	Wesley College	Geelong Grammar						1 length
1905	Wesley College	Melbourne						canvas
1906	Wesley College	Scotch						1/2 length
1907	Scotch	Geelong Grammar						2 lengths
1908	Scotch	Geelong College	Xavier				5:01.0	1 1/2 lengths
1909	Wesley College	Geelong Grammar	Melbourne				5:12.0	1 length
1910	Wesley College	Scotch	Melbourne				5:00.4	1 length
1911	Wesley College	Geelong Grammar	Melbourne				5:44.0	1 1/2 lengths
1912	Wesley College	Geelong Grammar	Xavier					1 length
1913	Wesley College	Scotch	Melbourne					1 1/2 lengths
1914	Geelong Grammar	Scotch	Geelong College				5:09.0	1 1/2 lengths
1915	Wesley College	Scotch	Geelong Grammar				5:17.6	1/2 length
1916	Melbourne	Geelong Grammar					5:33.8	1/2 length
1917	Geelong Grammar	Geelong College	Wesley College				5:52.2	2 lengths
1918	Melbourne	Wesley College	Geelong Grammar				5:13.0	2 1/2 lengths
1919	Scotch	Xavier	Geelong Grammar				5:38.0	1 canvas
1920	Geelong Grammar	Scotch	Xavier				5:34.0	1 canvas
1921	Scotch	Melbourne	Wesley College				5:47.2	1/3 length
1922	Geelong Grammar	Melbourne					5:22.5	1 length
1923	Melbourne	Geelong Grammar	Scotch				5:54.4	1/2 length
1924	Geelong Grammar	Melbourne	Scotch				5:29.4	1 foot
1925	Scotch	Wesley College	Melbourne				5:15.2	1/2 length
1926	Scotch	Geelong Grammar	Melbourne				5:11.0	1 canvas
1927	Scotch	Wesley College	Geelong Grammar				5:27.0	1/2 length
1928	Xavier	Scotch	Wesley College				5:59.0	1/3 length
1929	Xavier	Scotch	Melbourne				5:06.0	¾ length
1930	Melbourne	Wesley College					5:35.2	¾ length
1931	Melbourne	Wesley College	Xavier				4:53.5	1 length
1932	Melbourne	Geelong Grammar	Wesley College				5:13.0	1¼ lengths
1933	Wesley College	Geelong Grammar	Scotch				5:42.8	1/2 length
1934	Geelong Grammar	Melbourne	Wesley College				5:18.4	2 lengths
1935	Geelong Grammar	Melbourne	Scotch				5:35	2/3 length
1936	Geelong College	Wesley College	Geelong Grammar				5:46.8	1¼ lengths
1937	Xavier	Wesley College	Melbourne				5:38.4	2 lengths
1938	Melbourne	Geelong Grammar	Scotch				5:06.4	¾ length
1939	Melbourne	Wesley College	Scotch				5:04.2	1 length
1940	Melbourne	Scotch	Geelong Grammar				5:04.2	1 1/2 lengths
1941	Scotch	Melbourne	Wesley College				5:12.4	1 length
1942	Wesley College							
1943	Melbourne (Yarra); Geelong Grammar (Barwon)	Scotch; Geelong College					5:14.0 (Yarra)	4 lengths 1 length
1944	Geelong College	Melbourne	Wesley College				5:04.0	1 1/2 lengths
1945	Melbourne	Geelong College	Wesley College				5:09.6	1 1/2 lengths
1946	Scotch	Geelong College	Melbourne				4:47.4	2 feet (0.61 m)
1947	Wesley College	Geelong College	Melbourne				4:46.2	1/3 length
1948	Xavier	Melbourne	Geelong College				5:06.0	1 length
1949	Melbourne	Xavier	Geelong Grammar				4:44.4	3 lengths
1950	Geelong Grammar	Scotch	Wesley College				5:04.4	1 canvas
1951	Scotch	Wesley College	Xavier				4:43.3	2 lengths
1952	Scotch	Geelong College	Geelong Grammar				4:45.0	1/2 length
1953	Geelong Grammar	Wesley College	Geelong College				4:43.0	1/2 length
1954	Geelong Grammar	Xavier	Melbourne				5:02.0	1 length
1955	Geelong College	Scotch=2nd	Wesley College=2nd				4:44.4	1/3 length
1956	Geelong College	Scotch	Xavier				4:58.0	1 length
1957	Geelong College	Scotch	Xavier				4:47.2	1¾ lengths
1958	Melbourne	Geelong College=2nd	Xavier=2nd				4:43.4	1 length
1959	Geelong College	Melbourne	Geelong Grammar				4:57.4	¾ length
1960	Geelong College	Wesley College	Scotch				4:51.8	canvas
1961	Wesley College	Scotch	Geelong College				4:37.4	canvas
1962	Wesley College	Xavier	Melbourne				5:00.4	1 length
1963	Scotch	Wesley College	Xavier				5:08.0	1¼ lengths
1964	Melbourne	Geelong College	Geelong Grammar				4:58.0	1/2 length
1965	Wesley College	Geelong Grammar	Caulfield				4:50.4	¼ length
1966	Scotch	Melbourne	Geelong College				4:31.2	¾ length
1967	Scotch	Melbourne	Geelong College				4:33.4	1 length
1968	Melbourne	Geelong Grammar	Caulfield				4.31.4	¾ length
1969	Scotch	Melbourne	Wesley College				4:32.0	1 1/2 lengths
1970	Wesley College	Geelong Grammar	Melbourne				4:31.4	canvas
1971	Geelong Grammar	Xavier	Wesley College				4:55.0	1 1/2 lengths
1972	Wesley College	Xavier	Melbourne				4:54.2	1 1/2 lengths
1973	Scotch	Xavier	Geelong Grammar				4:29.0	¾ length
1974	Geelong Grammar	Melbourne	Scotch				4:35.0	3 feet (0.91 m)
1975	Geelong Grammar	Geelong College	Scotch				4:47.0	1/2 length
1976	Geelong College	Geelong Grammar	Brighton				4:44.5	1 length
1977	Wesley College	Geelong College	Scotch				4:22.6	1/3 length
1978	Scotch	Melbourne	Xavier				4:45.0	1 metre
1979	Melbourne	Wesley College	St Kevin's College				4:42.6	2 lengths
1980	Melbourne	St Kevin's College	Xavier				4:36.0	¾ length
1981	Melbourne	Geelong College	Scotch	Brighton			4:51.0	2 lengths
1982	Melbourne	Carey	St Kevin's College	Wesley College			4:36.4	1/3 metre
1983	Brighton	Wesley College	Geelong College	Melbourne			4:43.5	1 length
1984	Wesley College	Melbourne	Brighton	Scotch			4:33.5	1 length
1985	Carey	Scotch	Geelong Grammar	Wesley College			4:39.2	1/2 length
1986	Geelong Grammar	Melbourne	Caulfield	Geelong College			4:30.8	¾ length
1987	Geelong Grammar	Scotch	Xavier	Carey			4:45.5	1 1/2 lengths
1988	Geelong Grammar	St Kevin's College	Brighton	Melbourne			4:41.1	1 1/2 length
1989	Geelong Grammar	Xavier	Geelong College	Brighton			4:37.7	1 length
1990	Geelong College	Scotch	Brighton	Xavier			4:39.0	2 lengths
1991	Geelong Grammar	Geelong College	Brighton	Scotch			4:15.2	1 length
1992	Scotch	Carey	Brighton	Caulfield			4:25.3	1¼ lengths
1993	Geelong College	Melbourne	Geelong Grammar	Brighton			4:36.8	¾ length
1994	Geelong Grammar	Melbourne	Brighton	Geelong College			4:34.5	2.41 secs
1995	Carey	Geelong College	Caulfield	Wesley College			4:16.0	1 length
1996	Carey	Melbourne	Brighton	Scotch			4:10.2	1/3 length
1997	Melbourne	Scotch	Brighton	Geelong Grammar			4:16.2	1/2 length
1998	Scotch	Geelong Grammar	Xavier	Haileybury			4:14.8	2/3 length
1999	Xavier	Geelong College	Scotch	Haileybury			4:15.2	1¼ lengths
2000	Geelong College	Carey	Geelong Grammar	Xavier			4:32.5	2/3 length
2001	Geelong College	Carey	Haileybury	Scotch	Geelong Grammar	Xavier	6:00.13	0.65 secs
2002	Melbourne	Scotch	Geelong College	Brighton	Caulfield	Wesley College	6:07.58	2.80 secs
2003	Geelong College	Scotch	Caulfield	Carey	Geelong Grammar	Melbourne	6:03.99	1.96 secs
2004	Scotch	Carey	Haileybury	Caulfield	Wesley College	Melbourne	6:17.70	0.78 secs
2005	Scotch	Geelong Grammar	Haileybury	Brighton	Xavier	Geelong College	6:07.74	6.46 secs
2006	Scotch	Geelong College	Geelong Grammar	Xavier	Carey	Melbourne	6:17.59	3.61 secs
2007	Scotch	Geelong Grammar	Xavier	Carey	Melbourne	Haileybury	7:02.00	7.16 secs
2008	Scotch	Melbourne	Geelong Grammar	St Kevin's College	Brighton	Xavier	6:02.68	4.86 secs
2009	Melbourne	St Kevin's College	Brighton	Scotch	Carey	Wesley College	5:59.93	6.13 secs
2010	Scotch	Melbourne	Geelong Grammar	Brighton	Wesley College	Carey	6:25.92	2.53 secs
2011	Scotch	Melbourne	Geelong Grammar	Xavier	Wesley College	Haileybury	6:32.96	2.47 secs
2012	Scotch	St Kevin's College	Melbourne	Geelong Grammar	Geelong College	Wesley College	6:12.66	4.94 secs
2013	Scotch	Geelong Grammar	Melbourne	Geelong College	St Kevin's College	Wesley College	6:13.36	2.84 secs
2014	Scotch	Melbourne	Brighton	Geelong Grammar	Wesley College	Carey	6:22.21	4.66 secs
2015	Scotch	Melbourne	Brighton	Geelong Grammar	St Kevin's College	Geelong College	5:56.07	3.40 secs
2016	Melbourne	Wesley College	Scotch	Geelong College	St Kevin's College	Geelong Grammar	6:16.41	5.93 secs
2017	Scotch	Melbourne	Geelong Grammar	St Kevin's College	Geelong College	Caulfield	5:49.50	4.4 secs
2018	Scotch	Brighton	Geelong College	Geelong Grammar	St Kevin's College	Xavier	5:54.49	3.46 secs
2019	Scotch	Brighton	Melbourne	St Kevin's College	Geelong Grammar	Xavier	6:01.42	2.75 secs
2020	Race was not run due to COVID-19 Pandemic							
2021	Brighton	St Kevin's College	Scotch	Melbourne	Xavier	Geelong Grammar	5:57.86	0.42 secs
2022	Scotch	Melbourne	St Kevin's College	Wesley College	Xavier	Geelong Grammar	5:52.85	3.70 secs
2023	Scotch	Wesley College	St Kevin's College	Xavier	Geelong Grammar	Carey	6:12.89	1.60 secs
2024	Brighton	Xavier	Melbourne	Scotch	St Kevin's College	Geelong College	6:17.82	4.27 secs
2025	Scotch	Xavier	Melbourne	Brighton	St Kevin's College	Wesley College	6:13.63	4.27 secs
2026	Scotch	Melbourne	Xavier	Brighton	St Kevin's College	Geelong College	6:10.13	2.57 secs

Total Wins by School
Wins	School
50	Scotch
33	Geelong Grammar
28	Melbourne
24	Wesley College
13	Geelong College
5	Xavier
3	Carey
3	Brighton
0	St Kevin's College
0	Caulfield
0	Haileybury

==== Cumulative Wins ====
Head of River Victoria Boys 2026

=== Head of the River (Girls) ===
The 1st VIII is also known as the "Geelong Ladies Challenge Cup". This race is the actual "Head of the River" for the girls.

Winners by Year
Year	Winner	2nd	3rd	4th	5th	6th	Time	Margin
1981	Geelong College	Geelong Grammar	Melbourne Girls Grammar	Lauriston			3:14.0	1 length
1982	Geelong College	MLC	Geelong Grammar	Melbourne Girls Grammar			3:04.0	¾ length
1983	Geelong College	Geelong Grammar	Lauriston	Morongo			3:03.0	1/2 length
1984	MLC	Morongo	Geelong Grammar	Lauriston			3:07.7	¾ length
1985	Geelong Grammar	Geelong College					3:19.2	2 1/2 lengths
1986	Geelong Grammar	Wesley College	Geelong College	Carey			3:00.8	1/2 length
1987	Wesley College	Geelong Grammar	Geelong College	Carey			6:15.0	1 1/2 lengths
1988	Geelong Grammar	Wesley College	Carey	Geelong College			6:17.0	4 lengths
1989	Geelong College	Wesley College	Geelong Grammar	Carey			5:53.8	1 length
1990	Geelong Grammar	Geelong College	Wesley College	Carey			5:56.0	canvas
1991	Geelong Grammar	Geelong College	Carey	Wesley College			5:26.5	1/2 length
1992	Geelong College	Geelong Grammar	Carey	Caulfield			5:45.3	2 1/2 lengths
1993	Geelong Grammar	Caulfield	Carey	Geelong College			6:00.0	2 1/2 lengths
1994	Geelong Grammar	Geelong College	Caulfield	Wesley College			5:47.3	9.34 secs
1995	Geelong Grammar	Geelong College	Carey	Wesley College			5:19.2	2 1/2 lengths
1996	Geelong Grammar	Carey	Geelong College	Wesley College			5:20.5	1 length
1997	Geelong Grammar	Carey	Wesley College	Caulfield			5:24.4	1 length
1998	Geelong Grammar	Geelong College	Wesley College	Carey			4:52.8	2 1/2 lengths
1999	Geelong College	Geelong Grammar	Firbank	Carey			4:51.7	¾ length
2000	Geelong Grammar	Wesley College	Geelong College	Carey			5:25.0	1¼ lengths
2001	Geelong Grammar	Caulfield	St Catherine's	Geelong College	Carey	Firbank	7:04.07	11.92 secs
2002	Geelong College	Geelong Grammar	Firbank	St Catherine's	Carey	Caulfield	6:58.95	3.21 secs
2003	Geelong College	Geelong Grammar	Caulfield	St Catherine's	Firbank	Carey	7:01.42	4.49 secs
2004	Carey	Geelong College	Geelong Grammar	Caulfield	Wesley College		7:08.82	6.62 secs
2005	Carey	Geelong Grammar	Geelong College	Wesley College	Caulfield	Firbank	7:06.95	3.69 secs
2006	Geelong College	Geelong Grammar	Wesley College	Caulfield	Carey		7:27.09	6.82 secs
2007	Geelong Grammar	Wesley College	Geelong College	Carey	Caulfield	Haileybury	7:07.26	9.47 secs
2008	Geelong Grammar	Wesley College	Caulfield	Carey	Geelong College	Haileybury	7:07.87	18.49 secs
2009	Geelong Grammar	Carey	Wesley College	Haileybury	Geelong College	Caulfield	7:04.22	7.18 secs
2010	Geelong Grammar	Geelong College	Haileybury	Wesley College	Carey	Caulfield	7:27.69	2.25 secs
2011	Geelong College	Geelong Grammar	Wesley College	Haileybury	Carey	Caulfield	7:37.25	2.56 secs
2012	Caulfield	Geelong Grammar	Wesley College	Carey	Geelong College	Haileybury	7:13.92	2.57 secs
2013	Caulfield	Geelong Grammar	Carey	Geelong College	Wesley College	Haileybury	7:25.64	1.94 secs
2014	Geelong Grammar	Carey	Geelong College	Wesley College	Haileybury	Caulfield	7:26.19	9.02 secs
2015	Geelong Grammar	Caulfield	Geelong College	Carey	Haileybury	Wesley College	6:46.71	27.07 secs
2016	Geelong Grammar	Caulfield	Geelong College	Wesley College	Carey	Haileybury	7:16.95	18.89 secs
2017	Geelong Grammar	Geelong College	Wesley College	Carey	Haileybury	Caulfield	6:55.38	3.59 secs
2018	Geelong Grammar	Wesley College	Geelong College	Haileybury	Carey	Caulfield	6:56.63	2.82 secs
2019	Geelong Grammar	Geelong College	Wesley College	Caulfield	Carey	Haileybury	6:53.00	3.14 secs
2020	Race was not run due to COVID-19 Pandemic							
2021	Wesley College	Geelong Grammar	Geelong College	Caulfield	Carey	Haileybury	6:51.53	7.06 secs
2022	Wesley College	Geelong Grammar	Geelong College	Carey	Caulfield	Haileybury	6:51.34	4.72 secs
2023	Geelong Grammar	Caulfield	Wesley College	Carey	Geelong College		7:17.37	6.56 secs
2024	Geelong Grammar	Wesley College	Geelong College	Carey	Caulfield		7:32.81	9.47 secs
2025	Geelong Grammar	Geelong College	Caulfield	Wesley College			7:08.26	5.00 secs
2026	Geelong Grammar	Wesley College	Geelong College	Caulfield	Carey		7:13.65	1.11 secs

Total Wins by School
Wins	School
27	Geelong Grammar
10	Geelong College
3	Wesley College
2	Carey
2	Caulfield
1	MLC
0	Haileybury

==== Cumulative Wins ====
Head of River Victoria Girls 2026

== See also ==
- Head of the Schoolgirls (Victoria)
- Head of the River (Australia)
- Associated Public Schools of Victoria
- Girls Sport Victoria (GSV)
