= Madeleine Taylor =

Madeleine Taylor may refer to:

- Madeleine Taylor (basketball), Australian basketball player
- Madeleine Taylor-Quinn, née Madeleine Taylor, Irish politician
