= Richmond High School (Victoria) =

Coordinates: 37°49′18″S 145°00′52″E

- Richmond, Victoria; Australia

Information
- Type: Public, Co-educational
- Motto: Make a Difference
- Established: 2018; 8 years ago
- Founders: Government of Victoria
- Principal: Andrea Thompson
- Grades: 7 - 12
- Campus: Griffiths St (Academic Campus) and Gleadell St (Sports Campus)
- Colours: Orange, Grey, Blue
- Affiliations: Melbourne Girls College
- Website: https://rhs.vic.edu.au/

Richmond High School (commonly referred to as RHS) is a high school located in the Melbourne, Australia suburb of Richmond. The school consists of a multi-storeyed modern academic building and a comprehensive sports campus, accommodating over 500 students - as of 2024.

Its predecessor, Richmond Secondary College, was the centre of a public protest and occupation of the site after it was listed for closure by the Liberal Kennett Government in 1993.

== History ==
=== 1967–1992 ===
The school commenced in 1967 in portable classrooms at the back of Brighton Street Primary School, before moving in 1970 to purpose-built premises on the banks of the Yarra River near Bridge Road. The school's name was changed to Richmond Secondary College, and in 1992 it was listed for closure by the Kennett Government. Community protests against the closure were endorsed by the Victorian Trades Hall Council and lasted 360 days before protesters were evicted by the Victoria Police Force Response Unit. The methods of crowd dispersal used by police on Monday 13 December 1993, which included "pressure holds" and a baton charge, were the subject of a parliamentary inquiry, with 30 demonstrators receiving $300,000 in a settlement from the Bracks Government in 2000. In 1994, the buildings became the campus of the new Melbourne Girls College.

In 2014 the Labor Party pledged to build a new Richmond High School if elected. In 2016 the Labor Government announced plans to build the school.

=== 2018–present day ===
The new Richmond High School is located in Gleadell Street (Sports and Multi-purpose Campus, opened in 2018) and Griffiths Street (Academic Campus, opened in 2019). Richmond High School welcomed its first Year 12 cohort in 2023. It ranked in the top 30 public schools in Victoria in their first VCE year.

Richmond High School is also one of the foundation network schools for the Centre for Higher Education Studies (CHES). They are also a member of The City Edge Network of Schools.

== Curriculum and extracurriculars ==
Richmond High School offers the Victorian Certificate of Education (VCE) to all of their senior students (10-12). RHS also offers VCE VM for years 10-12 upon request.

== Languages program ==
Richmond High School is the only government school in Victoria, to offer the Enhanced Chinese Program (ECP). This allows students to engage with bilingual Chinese enhancing academic excellence and engagement. Richmond High School from 2023 also offers a Spanish program.

== House system ==
House name	House colour
Yurlendj - Intelligence House	Blue
Booeegigat - Creativity House	Green
Djerring - Diversity House	Red
Dharrndun - Expectation House	Gold

== Heritage schools ==
- Richmond Central State (Primary) School - 1872-1987

- Richmond Girl's High School - 1926-1993

- Richmond High School – No. 8269 - 1967-1992

- Richmond Technical School - 1926-1988 (Merged with Richmond High School - No. 8269)

The new Richmond High School (2018-Present) serves as the key co-educational provider for the suburb of Richmond and is the local school for large parts of Abbotsford, Hawthorn and Kew.
