= Prince Philip Challenge Trophy =

Rowing event for women's eights

Prince Philip Challenge Trophy at the Henley Royal Regatta
- Venue: River Thames
- Location: Henley-on-Thames, Oxfordshire
- Dates: 2021–present

The Prince Philip Challenge Trophy, formerly the Junior Women's Eights, is a rowing event for women's eights at the annual Henley Royal Regatta on the River Thames at Henley-on-Thames in England. It is open to female junior crews from all eligible clubs or secondary schools and rowers who are still juniors (under 18). From 2022 the trophy changed its name from the Junior Women's Eight to the Prince Philip Challenge Trophy.

== Past winners ==
Year	Winner	Runner Up
2021	Headington School	Surbiton High School
2022	St Catherine's School, Toorak, Australia	Winter Park Crew, USA
2023	Greenwich Crew, USA	Deerfield Academy, USA
2024	Headington School	RowAmerica Rye, U.S.A.
2025	Headington School	Shiplake School
2026	Headington School	Shiplake School
