= Maharaj Prem Singh =

- Born: 15 November 1915; Rajlani
- Died: 1 June 2000 (aged 84); Jodhpur, Rajasthan, India
- Spouse: Rani Gulab Kanwar
- Children: 3
- Awards: Arjuna Award

Colonel Maharaj Prem Singh (15 November 1915 – 1 June 2000) was an Indian polo player and military officer. He is one of the most distinguished figures in Indian polo history. Born into a princely family in Jodhpur, Rajasthan, his career highlights include leading the Woolmers Park Team to victory in the Rome Championship in 1953 and contributing to India's success in tournaments like the Queen's Cup in the United Kingdom. Beyond polo, Singh excelled in golf, winning the Asian Championship in 1953, and was adept in shooting, squash, tennis, and cycle polo. A member of the Jodhpur Lancers until 1948, he played a pivotal role in reviving polo in Bombay, Madras, and Hyderabad after leaving the military. In 1961, he became the first polo player to receive the Arjuna Award.

== Maharaja of Rajlani and community work ==
As the Maharaja of Rajlani, Prem Singh was known for his kindness, generosity, and dedication to public welfare. He initiated and oversaw numerous development projects in the village, including:

- Construction of ponds and canals
- Building of a fort
- Creation of a large water tank for villagers with assistance from Australia
- Construction of a distinctive round water reservoir for animals in front of the fort

These contributions significantly improved water management and agriculture in the village.

== Cultural and religious significance of Rajlani ==
Rajlani is home to the revered Shri Bhairav Baori, located near the Maharaja's garden (Baag). Shri Bhairav Dev is believed to bless childless families with children, and devotees regularly offer oil and boiled moth (Baakla) in prayer.

== Personal life ==
Maharaj Prem Singh married Rani Gulab Kanwar, daughter of Thakur Devi Singh of Doongri, and had 3 children.

The eldest is Rani Aruna Singh, who married Apji Vijai Singh of Koela, also a distinguished polo player. They had 2 children.

- Kanwar Mahiraj Singh, who is now based in Australia.
- Baiji lal Sulina Kumari, who is survived by her daughters, Baisa Raveena Kumari and Baisa Shivina Kumari.

Rani Sheela Kumari Singh married Rajkumar Rameshwar Singh of Suket. They had 2 children.

- Maharani Kalpana Devi, married Maharao Ijyaraj Singh of Kotah, Rajasthan. They have one son, Maharaj Kumar Jaidev Singh.
- Maharaj Jai Singh, married Rajkumari Mriganka Kumari, daughter of Maharaj Shri Dalip Singhji Sahib of Jodhpur.

Maharaj Karan Singh married Rani Jayanti Kumari, and had 2 children.

- Maharaj Prithi Singh
- Baiji lal Priya Kumari

== Books ==
- Polo in India: a tribute to Maharaj Prem Singh by Sarina Singh

== Awards ==
- Arjuna Award 1961
