= Madeleine Taylor (basketball) =

Australian basketball player (born 1989)

Personal information
- Born: 10 April 1989 (age 37) Geelong, Victoria, Australia
- Listed height: 1.75 m (5 ft 9 in)

Career history
- 2009/10: AIS
- 2009/10: Bendigo Spirit

Madeleine Taylor (born 10 April 1989) is an Australian basketball player who has competed for Australian Institute of Sport and Bendigo Spirit in the Women's National Basketball League (WNBL).

== Personal ==
Taylor was born in Geelong, Victoria on 10 April 1989. She is 1.75 m (5 ft 9 in) tall. She attended Sacred Heart College in 2005 and 2006. In 2007, she was in year 12 at the school. Her parents are Simon and Jan. She has an older brother and an older sister.

== Basketball ==
Taylor played guard-forward. Taylor played junior basketball in Geelong. She came up through the YMCA programme, where she played her junior basketball. In May 2006, she was Basketball Geelong's Alcoa ARP Junior Representative Player of the Month. In 2006, she played for the Geelong U-18 representative team. That year, she also represented Country Victoria at the national championships. It was her fourth time representing Country Victoria. In 2007, she earned the Big V championship's Rising Star award in her first season playing in the league.

In 2008, her Victorian under-20 team finished first in the national championships. She played for the Australian Institute of Sport in the Women's National Basketball League during the 2009–2010 season from the months of October 2009 to December 2009, and wore guernsey number 20. Before and after her time with the Australian Institute of Sport team, she was on the Bendigo Spirit's development squad.

In 2010, she played for the Geelong team in the Big V league. In a game against the Hume City Broncos, she scored 18 points in her team's 76–69 victory. In a round 15 game against Melbourne that her team lost 68 – 53, she scored 15 points and had 8 rebounds. In 2011, she played for the Geelong Supercats in their debut in the SEABL. In 2012, she was playing for Geelong in the Big V league, where she averaged 13.6 points per game, 5.8 rebounds per game and 2.4 assists per games while having a 36.8% field goal percentage.

== Netball ==
Taylor plays goal defense in netball. She competed in the Geelong Football League Netball Grand Final in 2007 where she was on the team for St Joseph in the game against South Barwon. She made a decision in 2007 to focus less on netball and more on basketball.
