= Elizabeth Kirkhope =

Australian headmistress (1896–1978)

Elizabeth Kilgour Kirkhope
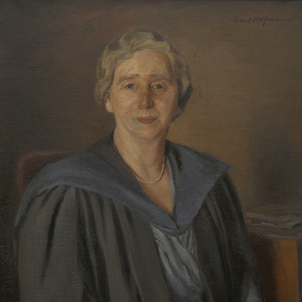
- from a painting by Robert Hoffman
- Born: 8 February 1896; Carlton, Victoria
- Died: 26 November 1978 (aged 82); Canterbury, New South Wales
- Education: University of Melbourne
- Occupation: Head teacher
- Known for: Lauriston Girls' School
- Predecessor: Margaret and Lilian Irving
- Successor: Gladys Davies

Elizabeth Kilgour Kirkhope (8 February 1896 – 26 November 1978) was an Australian headmistress. She bought her alma mater Lauriston Girls' School from its founders and this school is still extant.

== Life ==
Kirkhope was born in Carlton, Victoria in 1896. She was the first of nine children of Elizabeth Kilgour (born Corr) and John Kirkhope who were both Scots. Her father was a clergyman and he and Elizabeth came to Australia the year before to create a new branch of the Catholic Apostolic Church. The Catholic Apostolic Church had been founded by Edward Irving and his granddaughters would start Lauriston Girls' School.

She was an early pupil at Lauriston Girls' School and she became head girl and dux. She left the school and graduated in 1918 and qualified as a teacher in 1919 both at the University of Melbourne. In 1920 she left university with a master's degree in mathematics and returned to Lauriston as a very qualified teacher. Kirkhope left to teach elsewhere and in 1928 Kirkhope was appointed as head of Lowther Hall Anglican Grammar School. She guided that school through the depression.

She left Australia and taught in London. She rejoined Lauriston Girls' School in 1933 as headmistress, taking over from the founders who left the running to her. Two years later in 1935, she bought that school from the Irving sisters. The school prospered and in 1948 Kirkhope and her brothers converted it into a not-for-profit company. Kirkhope retired in 1956 but remained at the school until 1964. Her position as head has taken by Gladys Davies who like Kirkhope was an Old Lauristonian. She served until 1972.

== Death and legacy ==
Kirkhope died in the Sydney suburb of Canterbury in 1978. Lauriston Girls' School was still extant in 2023, when it commands high fees.
