= Sarina Singh =

Australian writer and travel author

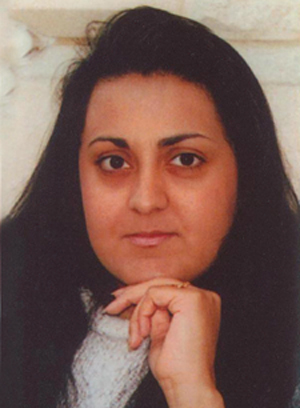
- Born: Melbourne, Australia
- Education: Business Degree (Melbourne, Australia); Postgraduate Journalism (Melbourne, Australia)
- Occupations: Writer; Travel guidebook author
- Writing career
- Subject: Writing
- Website: sarinasingh.com

Sarina Singh is an Australian writer and travel author. She has been published by a wide range of international newspapers and magazines and has been a senior author and columnist for travel publisher Lonely Planet.

== Early life ==
Singh's father came to Australia in 1955 to study medicine at the University of Melbourne. In an editorial, Singh wrote that when her father arrived in Australia from India via Fiji, where his own father had moved the family in the aftermath of World War I, Australia was still "ruled by the now-infamous White Australia policy." She described herself as "an Australian of Indian descent, who has lived in Melbourne most of her life". Singh also wrote that her parents valued quality education and that she and her brothers were educated in private schools in Melbourne. She studied at Melbourne's prestigious Lauriston Girls' School and her brothers attended Scotch College. Both of her brothers are Doctors of Medicine.

== Writing career ==
Singh has contributed to around 50 Lonely Planet books (usually as senior author) including many editions of the bestselling India guidebook, as well as Rajasthan, Aboriginal Australia & the Torres Strait Islands, North India, Mauritius, Réunion & Seychelles, Pakistan & the Karakoram Highway, South India, Australia & New Zealand, Delhi, Melbourne, Sydney and Africa. She has been interviewed by dozens of broadcasters, including the BBC and ABC, for her travel expertise. She has also written travel articles for various global publications including National Geographic Traveler and Condé Nast Traveller. National Geographic refers to Singh as an "India expert". Singh was commissioned by Maharana Arvind Singh Mewar of Udaipur to write, Polo in India: a tribute to Maharaj Prem Singh.

== Beyond the Royal Veil ==
In 2002 Singh co-wrote and co-directed a 52-minute television documentary program, Beyond the Royal Veil. The documentary, a German-Australian co-production for the Australian public television network, SBS, is set in India and depicts the changing roles of two royal families in former princely states and the challenges they face to stay viable in modern-day India. The documentary premiered at the Melbourne International Film Festival, before screening on television in Germany and on SBS in Australia.

== Publications ==
- Singh, Sarina, et al., India (Lonely Planet Country Guide), Lonely Planet, trade paperback, 1244 pages, 13th Updated edition (1 October 2009), ISBN 978-1-74179-151-8
- Singh, Sarina, et al., South India (Lonely Planet Regional Guide), Lonely Planet, trade paperback, 576 pages, 5th edition (1 October 2009) ISBN 978-1-74179-155-6
- Singh, Sarina, et al., Pakistan & the Karakoram Highway (Country Guide), Lonely Planet, trade paperback, 432 pages, 7th edition (1 May 2008), ISBN 978-1-74104-542-0
- Singh, Sarina, et al., Aboriginal Australia & the Torres Strait Islands: Guide to Indigenous Australia, Lonely Planet (July 2001), trade paperback, 448 pages, ISBN 978-1-86450-114-8
- Singh, Sarina, et al., Lonely Planet Citiescape Delhi, Lonely Planet, (October 2006), hardcover, 93 pages, ISBN 978-1-74104-936-7
- Singh, Sarina, et al., Lonely Planet India: Haryana & Punjab, Lonely Planet (1 September 2009), (kindle re-release from India.)
- Singh, Sarina, et al., Lonely Planet Mauritius, Reunion & Seychelles, Lonely Planet (February 2001), trade paperback, 336 pages, 4th edition, ISBN 978-0-86442-748-9
- Singh, Sarina, et al., contributors; Sacred India, Lonely Planet (1999), hardcover, 166 pages, ISBN 978-1-86450-063-9
- Singh, Sarina, et al., India: Essential Encounters, September 2010, hardcover, ISBN 978-0-646-53051-2

== Books ==
- Polo in India: A Tribute to Maharaj Prem Singh, Roli Books, ISBN 978-81-7436-093-9
- India: Essential Encounters, commissioned by Richard I’Anson, ISBN 978-0646530512
