= Hildred Mary Butler =

Australian microbiologist

- Born: 9 October 1906; Elsternwick, Victoria
- Died: 8 April 1975 (aged 68); Melbourne

Academic background
- Education: University of Melbourne

Academic work
- Era: 1938–1971
- Institutions: Baker Medical Research Institute, Royal Women's Hospital
- Main interests: microbiologist
- Notable works: Blood Cultures and Their Significance

Hildred Mary Butler (9 October 1906 – 8 April 1975) was an Australian microbiologist noted for her research and discoveries in identifying the bacteria causing 'childbed fever' (known as puerperal sepsis today). The Royal Women's Hospital Biographical Compendium describes her as "one of the great and gifted medical bacteriologists this country has produced". Her work both as a clinician and researcher gained distinction on an international level. Born in Melbourne, Victoria to Rose Josephine Hancock and Archie Butler, she attended Lauriston Girls' School and then the University of Melbourne, attaining a BSc in 1928 and DSc in 1946. Butler initially worked as a bacteriologist at the Baker Institute and published eight papers in her time before transferring to the (now named) Royal Women's Hospital, where she worked for 33 years. Her discoveries in this role were included in 21 papers that were published nationally and internationally. Additionally, Butler held the positions in the Victorian Society of Pathology and Experimental Medicine and the Association of Hospital Scientists. Accounts suggest she was a forthright woman with a considered manner who was admired and respected by clinical and non-clinical colleagues at all levels of seniority.

== Life ==
The daughter of Victorian-born parents, farmer Archie Butler and Rose Josephine Hancock, she was born in Elsternwick, Melbourne in 1906. Butler was educated at Lauriston Girls' School before going on to the University of Melbourne. In 1928 she attained her Bachelor of Science and later returned for a Doctor of Science (Microbiology) in 1946. From 1928 to 1938, she was Bacteriologist for the Baker Medical Research Institute at the Alfred Hospital. In this role Butler published eight papers and was the sole author of the 1937 book "Blood Cultures and Their Significance". Her work focused on the specific bacterial causes of 'childbed fever', now known as puerperal sepsis. Butler was able to show that four bacteria were largely responsible for serious 'childbed fever' and abortional infections: Group A steptococci (anaerobic and haemolytic streptococci), Staphylococcus pyogenes and Clostridium welchii.

From 1938 to 1971, Butler was employed as first Bacteriologist at the Royal Women's Hospital, working closely with clinician A. M. 'Bung' Hill. During that time, she helped establish a 24/7 bacteriological service at the hospital. In 1941 she had the Victorian midwives' regulations changed because of her findings showing that Group A haemolytic steptococci and Staphylococcus pyogenes were responsible for the highest risk of infection. At the time, patients infected with Group A streptococci and Clostridium welchii died before the bacteria could be cultured for identification but Butler was able to develop a method of diagnosis from stained slides which allowed for rapid commencement of treatment. Sources say she investigated some 236,000 postpartum infections in confined patients and 64,000 patients who had abortions. The 33 years of work was captured in 21 papers (8 were solely credited to her) and the book Blood Cultures and Their Significance.

Butler served as treasurer for the Victorian Society of Pathology from 1940 to 1956 and president of the Association of Hospital Scientists in Victoria in 1958 and again from 1964 to 1965. Additionally she lectured medical students for 25 years and her work is recognised as being first in the field as well as being statistically significant for the magnitude of data.

Despite retiring officially in 1971, Butler continued to contribute to the field despite her own health challenges. She died at the Royal Women's Hospital in Melbourne at the age of 68.
