= Margaret Kiddle =

Australian writer and historian

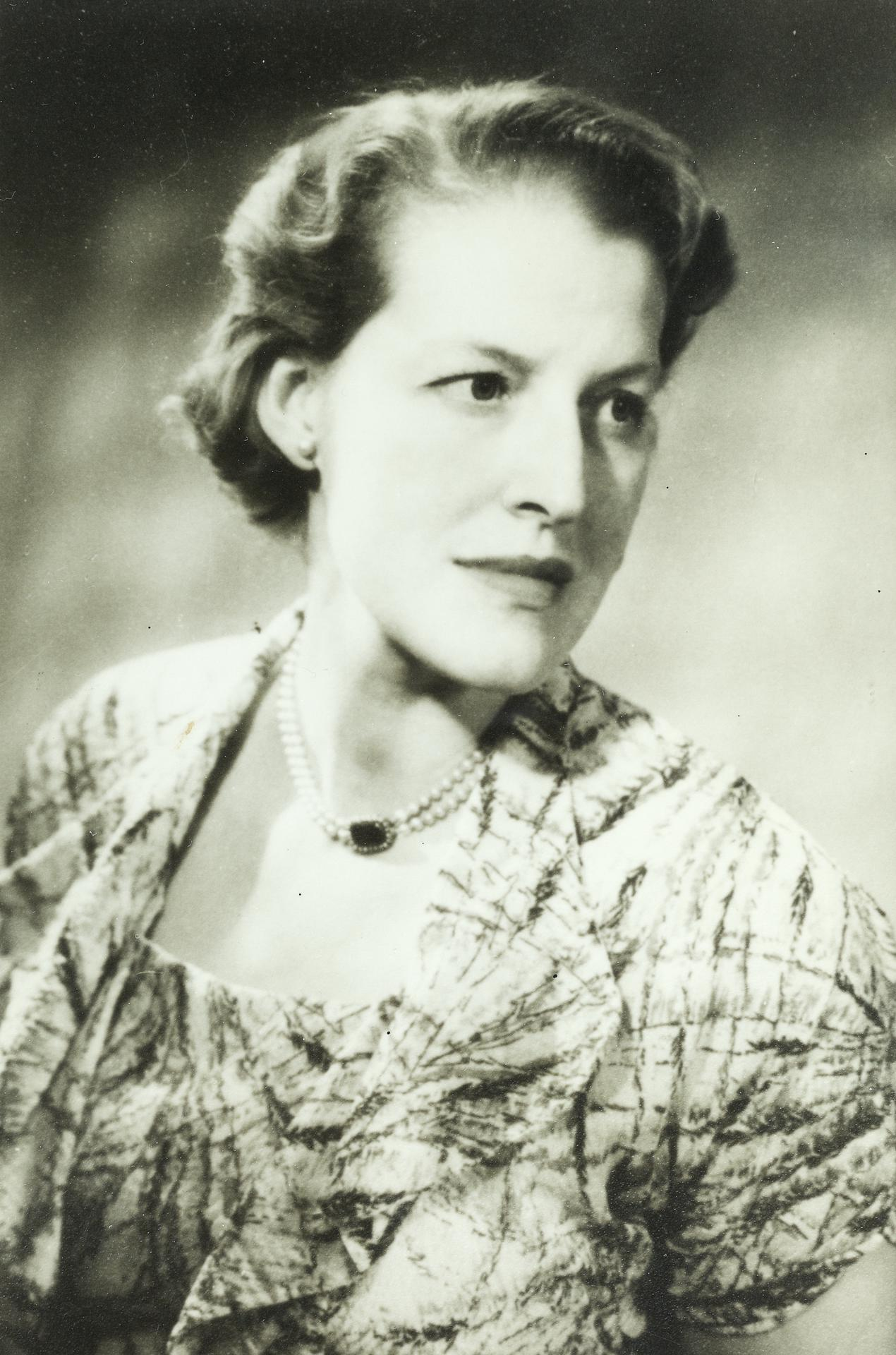
Margaret Kiddle

Margaret (Loch) Kiddle (10 September 1914 — 3 May 1958) was an Australian writer and historian. She wrote Moonbeam Stairs (1945), West of Sunset (1949), Caroline Chisholm (1950), The Candle (1950), and Men of Yesterday: A Social History of the Western District of Victoria 1834–1890, which was published posthumously in 1961.

== Early life ==
Kiddle was born on 10 September 1914 at South Yarra, Melbourne, Australia. She was the eldest of four children of John Beacham Kiddle and Mauna Loa (née Burnett). She attended St Catherine's School, Toorak from 1921 to 1926 and Melbourne Church of England Girls' Grammar School from 1927 to 1933.

== Career ==
Kiddle attended the University of Melbourne, receiving her B.A. in 1938 and her M.A. in 1947. After graduation, she worked in the history department, first as a tutor and later as a senior tutor. She did research in Britain and was a research fellow at the Australian National University.

Kiddle died on 3 May 1958 at Richmond, Melbourne. She spent her last moments working on the manuscript of what would, after her death, be published as Men of Yesterday. This posthumous masterpiece is considered her best memorial. The idea of writing this book came in 1949 from a family friend suggestion for her to write about the Western District. Kiddle was mesmerised about the idea of answering questions about the settlers' origins and colonial experiences by having access to their diaries and letters. She worked on the manuscript on and off throughout her life. She planned to write other books, but by 1957 was too ill to begin other projects. After her death, friends prepared the draft for publication.
