= Gippsland Grammar School =

Location
- Sale, Victoria; Australia
- Coordinates: 38°5′42″S 147°3′54″E

Information
- Type: private school, co-educational, day & boarding
- Motto: Latin: Veritas Liberabit Vos (The truth will set you free)
- Denomination: Anglican
- Established: 1924
- Principal: Paul Walton
- Chaplain: Tim Morrison
- Enrolment: ~1000 (K–12)
- Colours: Black, green & white
- Website: https://www.gippslandgrammar.au/

Gippsland Grammar School is a private Anglican co-educational boarding and day school. Located in Gippsland, Victoria. The School has three campuses, two in Sale, and one in Bairnsdale

Gippsland Grammar's motto is Veritas Liberabit Vos, Latin for "the truth will set you free".

The school maintains international partnerships with Gahini Secondary School in Rwanda and Hikarigaoka Girls' High School in Japan.

== Controversy ==
The school has faced mounting legal claims by students in respect of historic child sex abuse allegations, with one student being awarded $1.1 million in compensation in 2022. This led to criticism by victims of the large disparity in payouts, with many other victims having received far less. One plaintiff lawyer representing claimants observed that the school's aggressive approach to defending such claims had backfired and resulted in more claimants coming forward.

Two staff members were also sentenced to terms of imprisonment for more recent offending. Former English teacher Gregory Gorton was sentenced to 2 1/2 years' imprisonment in 2014 for sexually assaulting a 15-year-old student in 2013. In 2020, a South African gap year tutor was sentenced to 20 months' imprisonment after being found guilty two counts of sexual penetration of a child aged under 16 and one count of encouraging a child to engage in sex for incidents that occurred in 2019.

Declining enrolments and the financial pressure created by the abuse claim liabilities have caused the school to suffer a cash flow crisis. According to the school's 2023 financial reports, the school was only seven enrolments away from its lender, National Australia Bank, calling in a multi-million dollar loan. The sudden resignation of principal Michelle Wakeham in February 2025 was reportedly prompted by the overwhelming pressure caused by the historic sexual abuse allegations and the school's financial challenges.

== Notable alumni ==
- Craig Huffer, international middle-distance runner
- Andrew McQualter, AFL footballer for the St Kilda Football Club and Gold Coast Suns and coach of the West Coast Eagles AFL team
- Irving Mosquito, AFL footballer for Essendon Football Club
- Lindsay Tanner, former Federal Minister for Finance
- Lara Dunkley, Netballer
- Josh Dunkley, AFL player
- Wil Anderson, comedian

== See also ==
- List of schools in Victoria
- List of boarding schools
- Victorian Certificate of Education
- Head of the River (Victoria)
