= Ann Church =

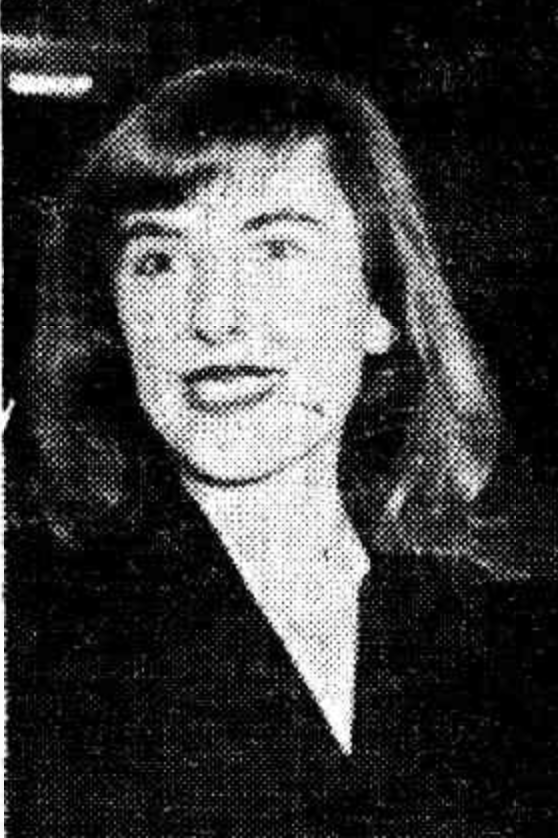
- Ann Church in 1950
- Born: Ann Rachel Church; 7 May 1925; South Melbourne, Victoria, Australia
- Died: 17 May 1975 (aged 50); Prahran, Victoria, Australia
- Education: (Royal) Melbourne Technical College (1942-45); National Gallery schools (1946)
- Occupations: Set and costume designer

Ann Rachel Church (7 May 1925 – 17 May 1975) was a set and costume designer from Australia. Her attention to detail is considered as setting a new standard in Australian theatre design for ballet.

== Life and education ==
Church was the daughter of a merchant, Seymour Church. Her mother Michlia, née Osporat, was Russian-born. Church traveled often in her early years. She attended St Catherine's School, Toorak and finished her higher education from the (Royal) Melbourne Technical College (1942–45). She also studied in the National Gallery schools.

Church met her husband, Raymond Hubert Michel Bury in London. They were married on 30 August 1952. They had no children.

== Work ==
Church started her career by designing vividly coloured sets and costumes for Les Belles Creoles, a ballet created by Rex Reid in 1949 to music by Aaron Copland for the National Theatre Ballet Company. After that, she continued working for the same company and designed sets for Peter and the Wolf and Prasnik. In 1951 Ann was assigned to design sets for Swan Lake (Act II). The following year she designed the decor and costumes for a full-length version of Swan Lake.

Church left Melbourne in 1952. She went to London and worked as a set designer at the London Palladium. By the late 1950s, however, she had returned to Melbourne where, in 1957, she designed the set decorations and costumes for Fête de St Valentin. Her most masterful work The Night is a Sorceress (1959) was also created in Melbourne.

== Death and legacy ==
Ann Rachel Church was a patient of infectious endocarditis. She died at Prahran, Victoria on 17 May 1975.

In 1998 the Australian Ballet donated Church's costumes designed for Melbourne Cup, a ballet first performed in 1962. In 2017 the Estate of Ann Church donated Church's paintings, design notebooks and fabric swatches covering the span of her career.
