= Vicki Anderson (psychologist) =

Australian neuropsychologist

Professor Vicki Anderson FASSA FAHMS
- Education: University of Melbourne
- Scientific career
- Workplaces: Royal Children's Hospital

Vicki A Anderson is an Australian clinical paediatric neuropsychologist, academic and researcher. Since 2002 she has been the Theme Director of the Critical Care and Neurosciences group at the Murdoch Children's Research Institute in Melbourne, Australia, and she established the Australian Centre for Child Neuropsychological Studies at the Royal Children's Hospital.

== Biography ==
Anderson was born in Melbourne, Australia to parents John and Sylvia Biviano, and completed her high school education at Sacred Heart College, Geelong before undertaking a BA (Hons), MA (Clin Neuropsych) and PhD at the University of Melbourne. She worked at the Royal Children's Hospital in Melbourne as a clinician, working with brain-injured children. After several years Anderson began a lectureship at the University of Melbourne, teaching 'Development of the Thinking Child,' 'Principles of Psychological Assessment,' and 'Child Neuropsychological Disorders.' In 2002, she was appointed professor and director of psychology at the Royal Children's Hospital.

== Research focus ==
Anderson's research includes developmental and acquired disorders of childhood that affect the central nervous system including the long-term consequences of traumatic brain injury to the developing brain. Anderson has carried out longitudinal studies identifying neurocognitive and social deficits which develop and persist long after childhood injuries. The Australian Centre for Child Neuropsychological Studies diagnoses and treats these impairments. Additional ongoing research aims to understand the neuropsychological implications of cleft and craniofacial disorders, as well as investigating the impact of childhood multiple sclerosis and demyelination on family, social and academic functioning.

== Awards and recognition ==
Anderson serves as associate editor for the BPS Journal of Neuropsychology and the APA Division 40 journal Neuropsychology and is a consulting editor on international journals specializing in neuropsychology. She has co-authored several textbooks and book chapters, and over 600 peer-reviewed scientific publications with over 5000 citations. She has served as President of the Australian Society for the Study of Brain Impairment, is a member of the APS College of Clinical Neuropyschologists and also serves on the board of governors of the International Neuropsychological Society. She is a Fellow of the Academy of the Social Sciences of Australia, a Fellow of the Australian Psychological Society and a fellow of the Australasian Society for the Study of Brain Impairment. She is a Senior Practitioner Fellow of the Australian National Health and Medical Research Council, and a member of the Australian Health Ethics Committee in the 2012-2015 triennium. In 2015 Anderson was elected Fellow of the Australian Academy of Health and Medical Sciences.

== Selected publications ==
- Anderson, Vicki A. (1982). Personality dysfunction following head injuries in children: a neuropsychological approach. [Parkville, Victoria]: University of Melbourne.
- Anderson, V. A.; Anderson, P.; Northam, E.; Jacobs, R.; Catroppa, C. (2001). "Development of Executive Functions Through Late Childhood and Adolescence in an Australian Sample". Developmental Neuropsychology. 20 (1): 385–406. doi:10.1207/S15326942DN2001_5.
- Muscara, F; McCarthy, MC; Rayner, M; Nicholson, JM; Dimovski, A; McMillan, L; Hearps, SJC; Yamada, J; Burke, K; Walser, R; Anderson, VA (2020). "Effect of a Videoconference-Based Online Group Intervention for Traumatic Stress in Parents of Children With Life-threatening Illness: A Randomized Clinical Trial". JAMA Netw Open. 3: e208507. doi:10.1001/jamanetworkopen.2020.8507. PMC 7395233. PMID 32735335.
- Babl, FE; Tavender, E; Ballard, DW; Borland, ML; Oakley, E; Cotterell, E; Halkidis, L; Goergen, S; Davis, GA; Perry, D; et al. (2021). "Australian and New Zealand Guideline for Mild to Moderate Head Injuries in Children". Emerg Med Australas. 33 (2): 214–231. doi:10.1111/1742-6723.13722. hdl:1959.11/59790.
- Anderson, V. A.; Anderson, P.; Northam, E.; Jacobs, R.; Catroppa, C. (2001). "Development of Executive Functions Through Late Childhood and Adolescence in an Australian Sample". Developmental Neuropsychology. 20 (1): 385–406. doi:10.1207/S15326942DN2001_5.
