= Melbourne Girls' College =

Location
- Richmond, Victoria; Australia; 37°49′19″S 145°0′52″E

Information
- Type: Single-sex, day school
- Motto: Lead and Achieve
- Established: 1994
- Oversight: Department of Education (Victoria)
- Principal: Tamy Stubley
- Years: 7−12
- Enrolment: 1,531 (2025)
- Colours: Navy blue, white, green, purple
- Website: www.mgc.vic.edu.au

Melbourne Girls' College (commonly referred to as MGC) is a government semi-selective girls’ secondary school located in Richmond, an inner-city suburb of Melbourne.

The school has one campus on the banks of the Yarra River which caters for the secondary education of girls from years 7 to 12, (11/12 VCE/VCE VET) and has an enrolment of 1531 (as of 2025), with a division between the Middle School (Year 7, 8 and 9) and Senior School (Year 10, 11 and 12).

Currently, girls from 212 Melbourne postcodes, in Melbourne and country Victoria, along with girls from overseas countries, make up the student population. Sixty countries of birth are represented at the school.

In 2024, Melbourne Girls' College was ranked eighth out of all state secondary schools in Victoria, according to The Australian Curriculum, Assessment and Reporting Authority (ACARA) reported results.

== History ==
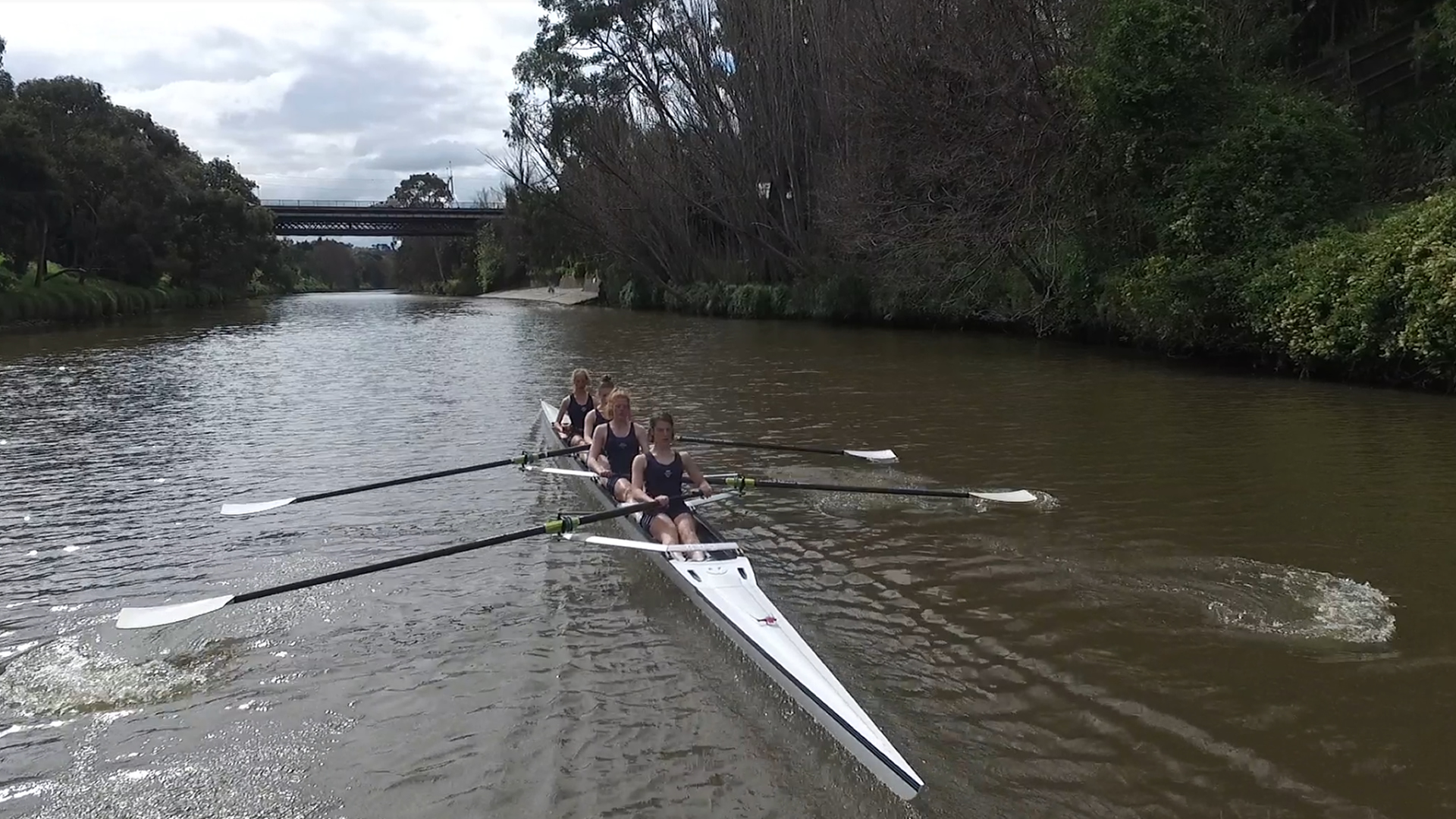
Melbourne Girls’ College operates a popular rowing program on the Yarra River.

Melbourne Girls' College was established in January 1994 with an enrolment of approximately 300 students. The college used the buildings of the former Richmond Secondary College, which had been closed in 1992 by the Kennett Government.

Although the college was established as an entirely new school, with a unique identity and mission, many of the founding staff and the initial intake of students, came from three other schools which had been closed by the Kennett government: Richmond Girls' High School, Malvern Girls' High School, and Richmond Secondary College.

The founding principal was Cavell Zangalis, previously the principal of Richmond Girls' High School. The school was founded on the former site of Richmond Secondary College. From 1995, Jan Parkes led the college for over seven years, developing it into an innovative educational institution. In 2002, a new principal, Judy Crowe, made changes to the curriculum structure and oversaw the development of several new facilities. Principal Karen Money joined the college in 2015 followed by current principal, Tamy Stubley.

In 2016, Melbourne Girls’ College initiated a S.T.E.A.M program. This program is designed to promote Science, Technologies, Engineering, The Arts and Mathematics across the school and as a career pathway.

Extracurricular programs run by the college include Australian Airforce Cadets, aerobics, environment, instrumental music, dance and a Confucius Classroom.

== School grounds and facilities ==
The school is situated on a single campus adjoining the Yarra River, approximately 4 kilometres from the Melbourne CBD. Facilities of the school include:

- Performing Arts Centre/Theatre/Dance Studio
- Library
- Food Technology Centre
- Gymnasium
- Rowing Centre/Boat House
- VCE Study Centre
- Wellbeing Centre
- STEAM Centre

== House system ==
As with most Australian schools, MGC has a house system through which students partake in inter-house competitions and activities. The college has four houses:

- Chisholm: Green
- Lyons: White
- Melba: Blue
- Maris: Purple

== Notable alumni ==
Notable alumni from the school include:

- Audrey Powne (Artist, Producer and Multi-Instrumentalist)
- Brianna Davey (Australian Footballer, Goalkeeper for the Matildas)
- Ellie Brennan (Victorian Women’s Rowing Lightweight Quad Scull)
- Isabella Giovinazzo (Actor, Producer and Director)
- Jess Cuddy (Victorian Women’s Rowing Masters Eight)
- Kimmy Nguyen-Thoi (Filmmaker, Director, Producer)
