= Albert Park College =

Location
- Albert Park, Victoria; Australia; 37.84472°S 144.94765°E

Information
- Type: Public
- Motto: Lead, Create, Inspire
- Established: 2011
- Principal: Steve Cook
- Years: 7–12
- Enrollment: 1375
- Colours: Grey, blue & yellow
- Website: www.albertparkcollege.com

Albert Park College is a public, co-educational high school located in Albert Park, Victoria, Australia. In 2018, the school had 1036 enrolments and 79 teaching staff. Construction of the new school was completed in late 2010 and it opened in February 2011. The school opened with Year 7 and grew past full capacity over the next 10 years, including general and SEAL (Select Entry Accelerated Learning) enrolments. The curriculum includes Arts and Culture (English, French, Art, Music and Drama), Science and Exploration (Mathematics, Science, Food and Technology) and Student Leadership (Sport, Physical Education and Community Leadership e.g. Lifesaving and Sailing).

== History ==
The new school is built on the site of the previous Albert Park College in Danks Street which closed at the end of 2006 due to a dramatic decline in enrolments. Originally opened as South Melbourne High School then renamed Albert Park High School, it was renamed again as Hobson's Bay Secondary College, and then Albert Park Secondary College before closing in 2006.

In 2002 the State Government spent $1 million on renovations to fix leaking walls and rotting carpet, local MP John Thwaites saying the decay was caused by eight years of neglect by the former Kennett government. In the five years to 2005 student numbers had fallen from 460 to 242, by 2006 they had fallen further to 206 with only 15 students enrolled to start year 7 the next year. Meanwhile, the suburb had gentrified during the past two decades, but local residents chose not to send their children to the school because of the poor reputation and low academic results.

The buildings were demolished between May and November 2008. Soil contamination (common in the area from the former Gasworks sites) delayed construction of the new buildings, which was originally planned to reopen in 2009. After delays in construction, a new purpose-built school was opened for Year 7 students in 2011, with contemporary architecture designed by Woods Bagot, and expanded to house 1200+ students from years 7 to 12, costing $20 million to build.

== Principals ==
- Founding Principal 2011, Steve Cook (ex-Williamstown High School)
- Assistant Principal, John Pobjoy
- Assistant Principal, Madeline Campbell
- Assistant Principal, Hayley Schirmer
