= Centre for Higher Education Studies =

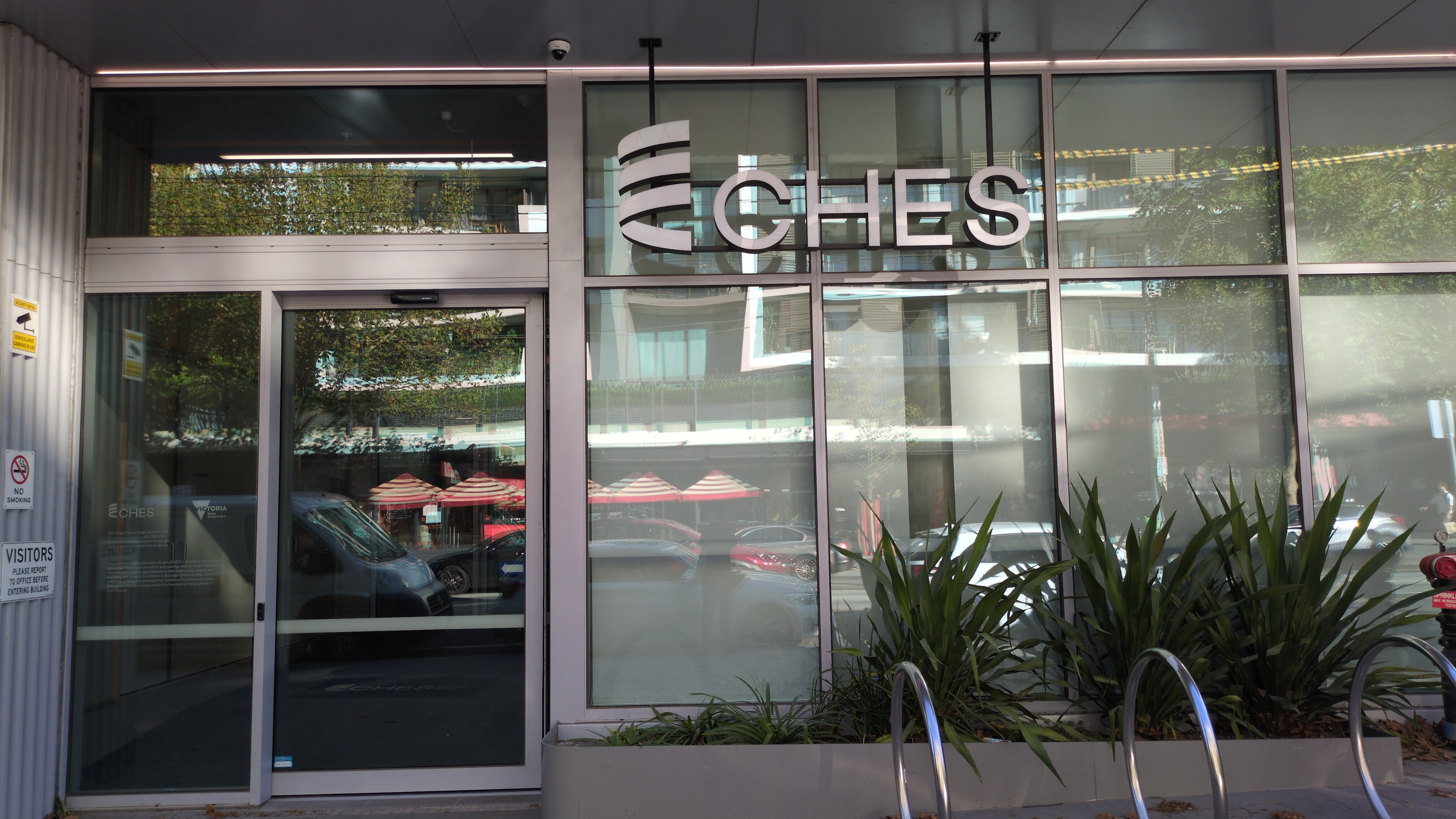

Location
- 669 Chapel Street; South Yarra, Victoria, 3141; Australia
- Coordinates: 37°50′10″S 144°59′46″E

Information
- Opened: 2023
- Principal: Stewart Milner
- Website: ches.vic.edu.au

The Centre for Higher Education Studies (CHES) is a government-funded co-educational academically selective senior secondary school located in Melbourne, Australia. The construction of CHES was completed in 2022 and blended on-site and online programs commenced in January 2023.

CHES was established to further improve educational outcomes for high-achieving and high-ability senior secondary school students across Victoria. The multi-storey centre includes an auditorium, technology-rich learning spaces and tertiary-standard science and design labs. Students remain enrolled at their secondary school and can undertake a course at CHES as part of their Victorian Certificate of Education (VCE). CHES programs are accessible through virtual platforms as well as on-site.

CHES offers four VCE studies: Algorithmics, Extended Investigation, English Language, and Specialist Mathematics. CHES also offers several higher education studies through Australian Catholic University, Federation University, La Trobe University, RMIT University, Swinburne University, University of Melbourne, and Victoria University.
