= Lowther Hall Anglican Grammar School =

Location
- Essendon, Melbourne, Victoria; Australia; 37°45′34″S 144°54′52″E

Information
- Other name: Lowther Hall
- Former names: Blinkbonnie's Ladies' College; Winstow Girls' School
- Type: Independent comprehensive single-sex primary and secondary day school
- Motto: Latin: Non Nobis Solum (Not for Ourselves Alone)
- Denomination: Anglican
- Established: 1920; 106 years ago
- Founder: Archbishop Lowther Clarke
- Educational authority: Victorian Department of Education
- Principal: Elisabeth Rhodes
- Years: K–12
- Gender: Girls
- Enrolment: 900 (2007)
- Colours: Blue and gold
- Affiliations: Association of Heads of Independent Schools of Australia; Junior School Heads Association of Australia; Alliance of Girls' Schools Australasia; Association of Independent Schools of Victoria; Girls Sport Victoria
- Website: lowtherhall.vic.edu.au
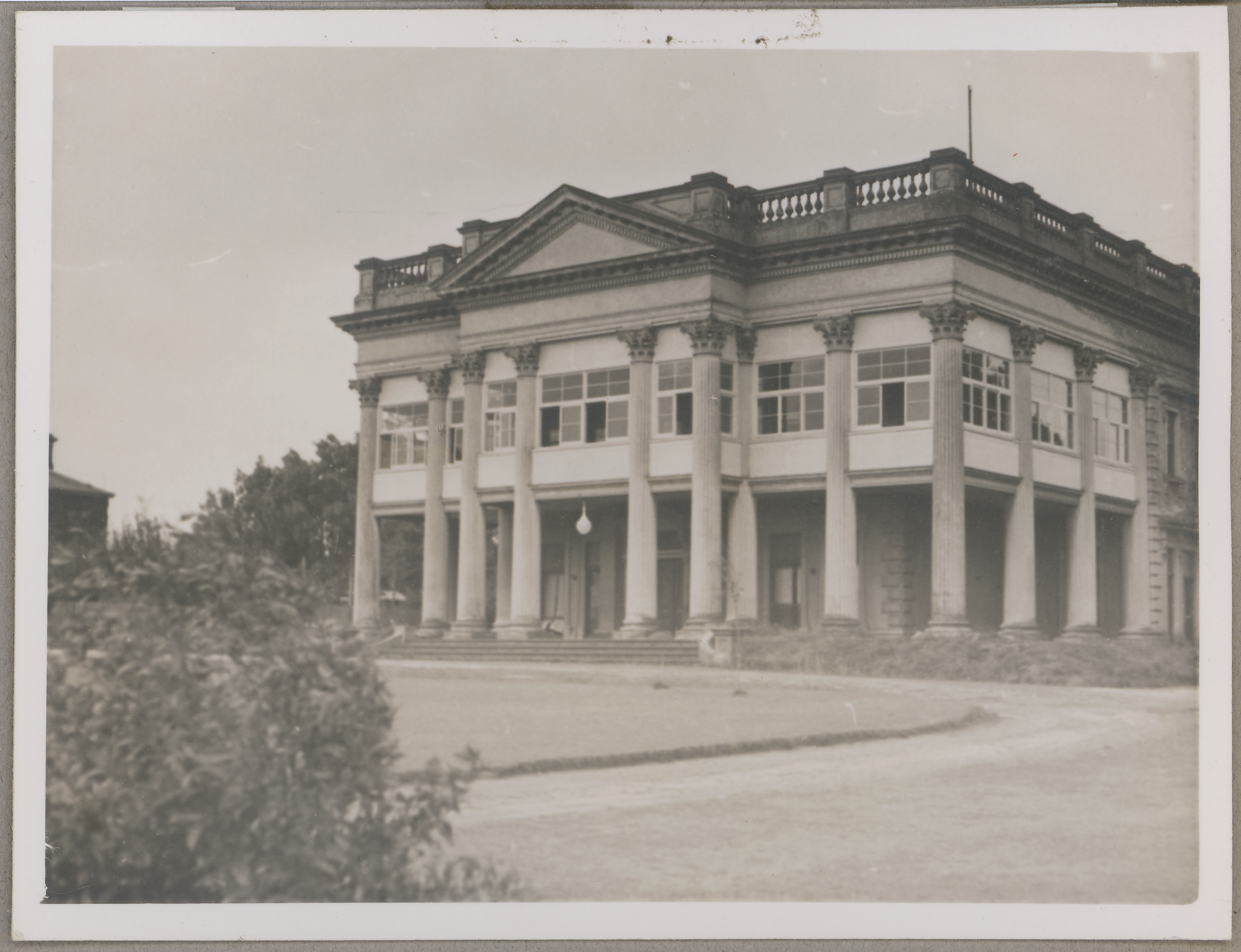
- "Earlsbrae Hall", Essendon, 1949
- Type: Mansion
- Location: 29 Leslie Road, Essendon

History
- Built: 1888–1890
- Built by: W. K. Noble
- Built for: Collier McCracken
- Original use: Private residence

Site notes
- Architect: R. A. Lawson
- Architectural style: Victorian Georgian
- Condition: Good
- Current use: School administration

Victorian Heritage Register
- Official name: Lowther Hall Anglican Grammar School
- Type: Registered place
- Designated: 9 October 1974
- Reference no.: H0146
- Heritage overlay no.: HO60
- Categories: Education; Residential buildings (private)

The Lowther Hall Anglican Grammar School, most often referred to simply as Lowther Hall, is an Anglican independent, comprehensive single-sex girls' primary and secondary day school, located in Essendon, an inner suburb of Melbourne, Victoria, Australia.

Established in 1920, the school has a non-selective enrolment policy and as of 2007 caters for approx. 900 students from Kindergarten to Year 12.

Lowther Hall is affiliated with the Association of Heads of Independent Schools of Australia (AHISA), the Junior School Heads Association of Australia (JSHAA), the Alliance of Girls' Schools Australasia (AGSA), the Association of Independent Schools of Victoria (AISV), and is a founding member of Girls Sport Victoria (GSV).

== History ==
=== Earlsbrae Hall ===
The Lowther Hall Anglican Grammar School comprises numerous buildings, varying in age. At the centre of the school is a two-storey former mansion, "Earlsbrae Hall", commonly referred to by students, parents and staff as "The Mansion". The mansion was constructed between 1888 and 1890 for the brewer Collier McCracken, designed by R. A. Lawson in the Victorian Georgian style, with sixteen Corinthian columns. It is one of the few known examples of the Lawson's work. Built by W. K. Noble, the exterior of the mansion has a Graeco-Roman temple exterior appearance. Inside the mansion there were 27 rooms over two levels with a promenade roof and included extensive use of carved woodwork and stained glass windows.

Earlsbrae Hall originally stood on almost one hectare (three acres). Whilst the site has been reduced in size, the house still maintains a relationship with Leslie Road. In 1911, E.W. Cole, the owner of Cole's Book Arcade, purchased Earlsbrae Hall for his family and added a large aviary. Cole had a 23-metre-long (75 ft) floral rainbow planted in the front garden. When Cole died in 1918, Earlsbrae Hall was sold to the Anglican Church and remodelled as a girls' grammar school.

The mansion was added to the Victorian Heritage Register on 9 October 1974 in recognition of its architectural and historical significance.

=== School history ===
The school started in 1920. It resulted from the amalgamation of Blinkbonnie's Ladies' College and Winstow Girls' School. The Lowther Hall Anglican Grammar School was named in honour of the Archbishop of Melbourne, Lowther Clarke, who was responsible for the purchase of Earlsbrae Hall. In 1928 Elizabeth Kirkhope was appointed as head and guided the school through the Great Depression. Kirkhope was appointed as head of the Lauriston Girls' School in 1933 and later purchased Lauriston in 1935 .

== Campus ==
Lowther Hall Anglican Grammar is located on Leslie Road in Essendon, which is situated close to amenities such as Essendon Station. There is also a hall, named the Joan M. Garde Cultural Centre, which houses dance and drama classrooms, private music rooms, a lecture theatre, changerooms, a stage, and sports offices. The Noelene Horton Centre focuses on the sciences over three levels, one of which is a rooftop learning area and the basement houses dance and music. Blinkbonnie House was opened in February 2018 and provides amenities for students who are in Kindergarten, Prep and Year 1. The basement houses performing arts, media, and the Mary Thurman Recital Space.

== Houses ==
The school has a house system. A total of 6; Booth(orange), Clarke(green), Hindley(red), Lees(blue), Moorhouse(yellow), and Perry(purple). The houses are named after affluential figures in the schools history. Each year, the houses compete in events such as athletics, swimming and Performing Arts, and each year, the House Cup is awarded to the House with the highest total of points from the year's events.

== Co-curriculum ==
=== Sport ===
Lowther Hall is a member of Girls Sport Victoria (GSV), comprising twenty-five girls' schools. Lowther has a reputation in the hip-hop dance sport area, with teams in state and national finals. The school has also had successful rowing seasons. Lowther Hall has won many titles in sport; most being in soccer, hip hop, netball, basketball, swimming and athletics.

==== GSV premierships ====
Lowther Hall has won the following GSV premiership.

- Indoor Cricket – 2016

=== Choir ===
In 2016, Lowther Hall was chosen to provide the Southern Hemisphere's first female cathedral choir at St Paul's Cathedral, Melbourne, after an 18-month selection process. The choice consists of eighteen girls from Years 4 to 10. The girls alternate with a choir of boys and men, the latter who led choral services at St Paul's since 1888.

== See also ==
- Architecture of Melbourne
- List of non-government schools in Victoria
- List of places on the Victorian Heritage Register in the City of Moonee Valley
