= St Catherine's School, Toorak =

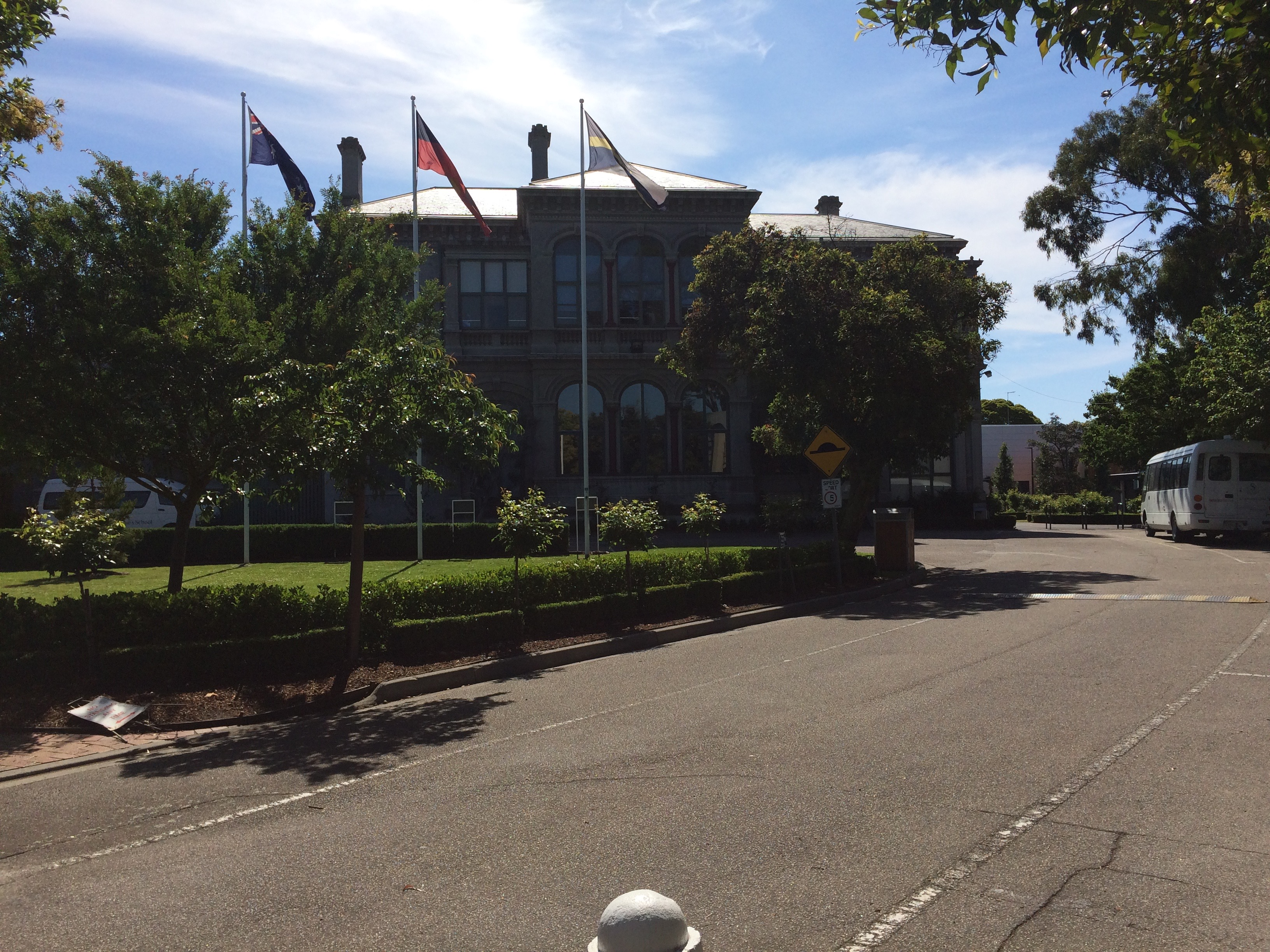
- St Catherine's School in November 2015

Location
- Toorak, Victoria; Australia; 37°50′17″S 145°1′15″E

Information
- Type: Independent, day & boarding school
- Motto: Latin: Nil Magnum Nisi Bonum (Nothing is great unless it is good)
- Denomination: Non-denominational Christian
- Established: 1896
- Founder: Jeanie Hood
- Chairman: J. Hodder
- Principal: Natalie Charles
- Years offered: ELC–12
- Gender: Girls
- Enrolment: ~760 (P–12)
- Colours: Blue, gold and grey
- Slogan: One of Australia's finest since 1896
- Affiliation: Girls Sport Victoria
- Website: stcatherines.net.au

St Catherine's School is an independent and non-denominational Christian day and boarding school for girls, located in Toorak, an inner south-eastern suburb of Melbourne, Victoria, Australia.

Established in 1867 as Castlemaine Ladies' College, the school has a non-selective enrolment policy. As of 2025, the school caters for approximately 670 students from pre-school to Year 12, including approximately 40 boarders, on a 2.9 hectare campus. Boarding students come to St Catherine's from country Victoria, interstate and overseas.

St Catherine's is a member of the Junior School Heads Association of Australia, the Alliance of Girls' Schools Australasia, the Association of Independent Schools of Victoria, the Australian Boarding Schools Association, and a founding member of Girls Sport Victoria.

== History ==
St Catherine's School was founded as Castlemaine Ladies' College in 1896 by Jeanie Hood in Templeton Street, Castlemaine.

At the instigation of Henry Langley, the first Anglican Bishop of Bendigo, his daughters, Ruth, Aphra and Nona took over the school in 1903. The Langley sisters later changed the school's name to Castlemaine Girls' College, and in 1911 to St Catherine's Girls College, Castlemaine, after the Anglican school St Catherine's School at Waverley in Sydney, where Ruth and Nona Langley had been educated. St Catherine's was a nominally Anglican school at this time in its history.

In 1920 St Catherine's School moved to Williams Road in Melbourne, where 48 pupils were enrolled. Ruth Langley had been joined in 1919 by Flora Templeton, who came as co-principal from Blair School, at St Georges Road, Toorak, with her students.

In 1922 St Catherine's Grammar School had 80 students, and in need of more accommodation, Langley and Templeton purchased "Kilbride House", formerly known as "Beaulieu", at 17 Heyington Place, Toorak. The building was ultimately renamed "Sherren House" in recognition of Ruby Lawrence (née Sherren), who was the schools matron from 1923 to 1946. Flora Templeton died in 1931, but Ruth Langley continued the administration of the school, appointing Edna Holmes as headmistress. After Langley's death, at St Catherine's, on 17 December 1933, her sister, Hilda Langley, became principal.

In 1942 World War II saw the school buildings requisitioned as a residence for the Women's Auxiliary Australian Air Force (WAAAF). St Catherine's found a temporary home at Mountain Grand, Warburton, and returned to Heyington Place in 1943. In 1944, Sophie Borland was appointed headmistress and worked with Hilda Langley as principal until the end of 1947, when the trustee of the late Ruth Langley decided to hand control of the school to a council. The first chairman of the council was the Right Reverend John McKie, Bishop in Geelong.

In 1948 Barbreck, at 33 Heyington Place, was acquired for use as a junior school, making possible further extensions to the secondary school, and pupil numbers increased to about 400.

In 1950 Mary Davis was appointed as principal and headmistress. In 1957, Hilda Langley died, ending the Langley family's long association with the school. R. Ann Baylis served as principal from 1971 to 1977 and her two daughters attended the school. In 1977, Dorothy Pizzey was appointed to this post. In 1978, St Catherine's School inaugurated the senior student Slawa Duldig Art Prize.

== Campus ==
St Catherine's School is located on a single 2.9 hectare campus, in suburban Toorak, 6 km south-east of the Melbourne city centre. The school comprises the Early Learning Centre, the Junior School and the Senior School.

== Sport ==
St Catherine's is a member of Girls Sport Victoria (GSV).

=== GSV premierships ===
St Catherine's has won the following GSV premierships.

- Cricket – 2011
- Hockey – 2001
- Tennis – 2013
- Volleyball – 2006
- Softball - 2022, 2023, 2024

=== National Rowing Championships (Sydney Cup for Schoolgirl Eights) ===
- 2016
- 2022

=== Henley Royal Regatta ===
On Sunday 3 July 2022, the St Catherine's 1st VIII made history by winning the Prince Philip Challenge Trophy for Junior Women's Eights at Henley Royal Regatta, beating Winter Park Crew, USA in the final.

To progress to the final, St Catherine's beat St Paul's Girls' School and then Hinksey Sculling School in the heats and Surbiton High School in the semi-final.

The crew, known as "Maxi" (rowing in a boat christened "MMXXI" following the school's first Head of the Schoolgirls Championship in 2021) was undefeated in the 2021/2022 domestic rowing season. They won the 2022 Head of the Schoolgirls Regatta and then the Schoolgirl Eight at the 2022 Australian Rowing Championships with a blistering second 1000m after trailing Melbourne Girls' Grammar by a length at the halfway mark.

The Crew

Cox: Summer Balla-Kellett, Stroke: Bronte Cullen, 7: Sienna Darcy, 6: Sarah Marriott, 5: Chloe Nevins, 4: Zara Bongiorno, 3: Lucy Green, 2: Jemima Wilcox, Bow: Zara Peele. Coaches: John Saunders and Brigette Carlile.

== Notable alumnae ==
Alumnae of St Catherine's School are known as "Old Girls" and may elect to join the schools' alumni association, the St Catherine's Old Girls' Association Inc. Some notable St Catherine's Old Girls' include:

=== Academia ===
- Margaret Loch Kiddle – historian (also attended Melbourne Girls Grammar School)
- Alison Patrick (née Hamer) – historian and first female Head of History at Melbourne University
- Sue Richardson – Professor of Labour Economics and Director of the National Institute of Labour Studies at Flinders University; Commissioner, Essential Services Commission of South Australia; author (also attended Preshil)

=== Business ===
- Jane Singleton – managing director of Jane Singleton Public Affairs Pty Ltd; CEO of the Australian Reproductive Health Alliance

=== Community and philanthropy ===
- Dame Elisabeth Murdoch – philanthropist, widow of Australian newspaper publisher Sir Keith Murdoch and mother of international media proprietor Rupert Murdoch
- Marigold Southey – Lieutenant Governor of Victoria; President of the St Catherine's School Foundation; Director of the Myer Foundation; Former Director of the Myer Family Company; Recipient of the Centenary Medal 2003; Daughter of Sidney Myer and Dame Merlyn Myer

=== Entertainment, media and the arts ===
- Barbara Brash – modernist painter and printmaker
- Ann Rachel Church – set and costume designer
- Anne Elder – ballet dancer and poet; namesake of the Anne Elder Award (Prefect and Dux 1936)
- Lisa Gorton – poet and author
- Rebecca Hossack, gallerist
- Mars McMillan – harpsichord maker
- Elyne Mitchell (née Chauvel) – author of the acclaimed 'Silver Brumby' series and other works
- Sunday Reed – supporter and collector of Australian art and culture
- Rosemary Ryan – artist, art director
- Elizabeth Wallfisch – classical violinist

=== Politics and law ===
- Linda Dessau AC CVO – Judge of the Family Court of Australia, AFL Commissioner, 29th Governor of Victoria
- Sophie Mirabella (née Panopoulos) – Liberal MP (also attended Albert Park High School)
- Anna Robertson (née Lally) – Judge of the County Court of Victoria
- Caroline Goulden – Associate Judge of the Supreme Court of Victoria
- Fiona Ryan SC – President of the Victorian Bar Council (2025-2026)

=== Sport ===
- Lauren Hewitt – Olympic and Commonwealth Games track athlete
- Joan Richmond – motor racing driver
- Anna Segal – Olympic skier
- Margaret Woodlock OAM - Olympic athlete

== Notable faculty ==
- Slawa Duldig (1901–1975) – artist, inventor, interior designer, and teacher; held in internment camp for two years as an enemy alien

== See also ==
- List of schools in Victoria
- List of boarding schools
- Victorian Certificate of Education
