= Lauriston Girls' School =

Location
- Armadale, Victoria; Australia; 37°51′6″S 145°1′32″E

Information
- Type: private, single-sex, day school
- Motto: Latin: Sancte Sapienter Strenue (Holiness, Wisdom, Strength)
- Denomination: Non-denominational Christian
- Established: 1901
- Founders: Margaret and Lilian Irving
- Chairman: Claudette Leeming
- Principal: Sabine Partington
- Staff: ≈145
- Years offered: ELC–12
- Gender: Girls
- Enrolment: ≈1,040 (P–12)
- Colours: Navy blue and white
- Slogan: Lauriston. For Life.
- Affiliation: Girls Sport Victoria
- Website: lauriston.vic.edu.au

Lauriston Girls' School is a private, non-denominational, day school for girls, located in Armadale, an inner south-eastern suburb of Melbourne, Victoria, Australia.

The school follows the motto; Sancte, Sapienter, Strenue. This motto is Latin for Holiness, Wisdom, Strength.

Established in 1901, Lauriston has a non-selective enrolment policy and is co-educational for early learning, three-year-old and four-year-old Kindergarten, and girls-only from Prep through to Year 12. The school currently caters for approximately 1040 students and offers the Victorian Certificate of Education (VCE) and is also one of the few Victorian schools that offer the International Baccalaureate (IB) for the Year 11/12 students.

Lauriston is affiliated with the Association of Heads of Independent Schools of Australia (AHISA), the Junior School Heads Association of Australia (JSHAA), the Alliance of Girls' Schools Australasia (AGSA), the Association of Independent Schools of Victoria (AISV), and is a founding member of Girls Sport Victoria (GSV).

== Early history ==
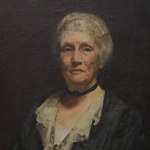
Margaret Irving co-founder and headmistress 1901-1933 by W B McInnes

The school was founded in 1901 by the Irving sisters, Margaret and Lilian, whose grandfather had founded the Irvingite church and whose father had bought and re-launched Hawthorn School for boys in 1875. An early pupil at Lauriston was Elizabeth Kilgour Kirkhope who became head girl and dux, she graduated with a master's degree in mathematics and returned to Lauriston as a teacher in 1920. Kirkhope left to teach elsewhere and returned in 1933 and in 1935 she bought the school. The school prospered and in 1948 Kirkhope and her brothers converted it into a not-for-profit company. Gladys Davies became the head when Kirkhope retired in 1956 but remained at the school until 1964.

== Campus ==
Armadale

Lauriston's main campus is located in Armadale, seven kilometres from the Melbourne CBD. The Armadale campus is architecturally interesting as it comprises not only classic Victorian buildings (such as the Montrose building and the Blairholme campus), but also newer buildings such as a science and technology centre constructed from energy-efficient, environmentally-friendly materials. A new gymnasium and wellbeing centre opened in 2022, along with the 5/6 Centre which kept many elements of the original gymnasium, as well as purpose-built Prep classrooms. Prep through to Year 12, excluding year 9, are educated at the Huntingtower road campus. Blairholme, located a short distance away on Malvern Road, was redeveloped, extended and reopened in 2025 as a co-educational early learning campus offering programs for as young as six week old infants, through to 3 and 4 year old sessional kindergarten.

=== Howqua ===
Howqua is a rural campus for Lauriston's year 9 students, located near the town of Mansfield in the Victorian high country. Attendance is compulsory for all year 9 students, with the girls spending the whole school year on the campus as full-time boarders. Students complete a full academic program along with a fitness and challenging outdoor program. Students at Howqua participate in activities such as downhill and cross-country skiing, solo camping, hiking, rafting, rock climbing and other outdoor recreational activities, culminating the year with a 6-day hike through Victoria's mountainous regions. Students also participate in a community service rotation during term 2, which involves activities such as building tracks, planting trees, gardening, visiting residential homes, acting as assistant teachers in rural schools, and running their own radio station.

There are 11 houses, each able to hold between 10 and 12 girls. These houses are Hollyer, Gillespie, Thompson, O'Brien, Fitz-Gibbon, Wirringga, Arthur-Robinson, Cramond, Mirrabooka, Kirkpatrick and Wu Kuo. Each house has beds, a bathroom, a kitchenette, dining/main area, wardrobe spaces, hike room, drying room and two balconies. The campus also offers a dining hall, a fire shelter, classrooms, Resource centre/library, music rooms, health centre, art centre, gym and staff houses. The campus offers a series of running tracks that are used weekly for a sequential fitness program. At the end of each term, a running challenge of 9.4 km is to be run in 1hr, called the Howqua River Road Challenge.

It began in 1993 and in 1997 it became compulsory for students to attend the Howqua campus for the duration of a full school year. Originally students stayed at Howqua for 1 semester only, now it is compulsory for them to stay the whole year. Girls return home once a term on exeats (3 to 5 days) as a mid-term break, and return home again for term holidays throughout the year.

The concept of Howqua is to help girls develop emotionally and physically independent of their family in a world without constant technology. Mobile phones are banned from use at Howqua and internet access is highly restricted. The girls at Howqua are issued each with devices used for learning purposes and are only accessible during the school day under teacher supervision. The Howqua program also aims to forge strong relationships between girls and social skills are greatly developed. All-year-round Howqua girls are urged to push themselves to achieve their goals, strengthening their sense of self-determination. The year leads up to many major end-of-year challenges.

In the 2006/2007 summer holidays, bushfires threatened the Howqua Campus. The campus was also threatened by fires and evacuated for the first time in early 2009.

== Curriculum ==
The Lauriston curriculum is managed within five learning areas, based on the developmental stages of children and adolescents.

1. Co-educational Early Learning: from 6 week old infants to 3 and 4 year old kindergarten
2. Junior School: Prep to Year 6
3. Lilian Bayly Centre: Years 7 and 8
4. Howqua: Year 9
5. Senior College: Year 10, 11 and 12

Upon graduation, Lauriston students typically achieve high Australian Tertiary Admission Rank (ATAR) and International Baccalaureate (IB) scores. In 2024, 79% of students received an ATAR of 80 or more, with a median ATAR of 90.15

== Co-curriculum ==
=== Music ===
Lauriston's music program caters for students from Prep to year 12 and offers a number of choral and instrumental ensembles, including bands and orchestras. Annually, there are approximately twenty-five performance occasions, including the 'Annual School Concert', which is held at the Melbourne Recital Centre.

From Years 3 and 4, a compulsory string orchestra group is formed. Violin, viola, cello, and double bass is assigned to them.

Lauriston also stages one musical and one play each year, one for students in years 5 to 8 and another for years 10 to 12. Recent performances include Seussical, Charlie and the Chocolate Factory, The Little Mermaid Jr, and Mary Poppins Jr.

=== Sport ===
Lauriston offers over 20 sports, which may be played at both competitive and recreational level. The school is an inaugural member of Girls Sport Victoria (GSV), an association of 24 girls schools throughout Melbourne. Through GSV, students in years 7 to 12 may compete at an inter-school level in athletics, basketball, cricket, cross country, diving, golf, hockey, indoor cricket, netball, soccer, softball, swimming, tennis, volleyball, and water polo.

Lauriston has a successful history in rowing. They usually compete in IVs but have occasionally raced a VIII. At the 2010 Head of the Schoolgirls Regatta the Lauriston senior crews won the Div 1 schoolgirl IV, Div 2 schoolgirl IV and Div 3 schoolgirl IV. The first IV were national gold medallists in the Schoolgirl IV in 2010, 2011 and 2013 and won a bronze medal in 2015.

==== GSV premierships ====
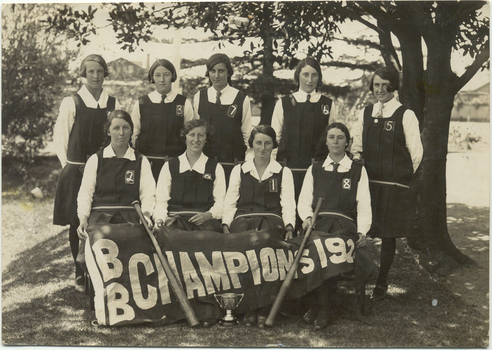
Lauriston Baseball Team in 1924

Lauriston has won the following GSV premierships.

- Cricket – 2014
- Hockey – 2007
- Indoor Cricket (2) – 2014, 2015
- Soccer – 2014
- Tennis – 2001
- Water Polo (7) – 2005, 2006, 2007, 2009, 2010, 2011, 2013

== Controversies ==
In 2010, Director of the Drama program at Lauriston, Mark Stratford, a well-known Australian actor, was charged with creating child sex abuse material involving Lauriston students, and utilising school space to do so. Stratford was dismissed by the school after an internal investigation. Stratford pled guilty to possession and creation of child pornography in 2008-2009, as well as possession of a hidden camera on school grounds. Stratford served a non-parole period of 14 months in prison and is a registered sex offender.

== Notable alumnae ==
Alumnae of Lauriston Girls' School are known as 'Old Lauristonians', and may elect to join the school's alumni association, the 'Old Lauristonian Association' (OLA). Some notable 'Old Lauristonians' include:

- Erika Feller AO, diplomat and lawyer
- June Mendoza AO OBE, Australian portrait painter
- Hildred Mary Butler, microbiologist
- Margaret Carnegie AO, writer, art patron and collector
- Esme Mary Sorrett (Molly) Fink, Rani of Pudukota (wife of Marthanda Bhairava Tondiman, rajah of the southern India principality of Pudukota)
- Beattie Goad, soccer player with Melbourne Victory and Melbourne City
- Jenny Hocking AM, historian, political science writer, documentary maker
- Chloe Hooper, writer and novelist
- Sybil Howy Irving MBE, the niece of the founders, she was the founder and controller of the Australian Women's Army Service
- Felicity Kennett, former presenter of Network Ten TV lifestyle program Healthy, Wealthy and Wise; wife of former Victorian Premier Jeff Kennett
- Poppy King, businesswoman; Young Australian of the Year 1995 (also attended Wesley College, Melbourne)
- Elizabeth Kilgour Kirkhope, former headmistress of Lowther Hall Anglican Grammar School; former owner and head of this school of Lauriston Girls' School
- Livinia Nixon, Channel 9 presenter; ambassador and former face of the City of Melbourne
- Elena Mandalis, actress
- Linda Phillips OBE, composer, pianist and music critic
- Madeleine Ryan, novelist
- Heli Simpson, actress, The Saddle Club
- Sarina Singh, writer, author, filmmaker
- Fiona Stewart, founder of NotGoodEnough.org; partner of Philip Nitschke
- Kathleen Alice Syme, journalist, company director and welfare worker
- Jessie Vasey, founder of the War Widows' Guild of Australia (also attended Methodist Ladies' College, Melbourne)

== See also ==
- List of schools in Victoria
- Victorian Certificate of Education
- International Baccalaureate
