= Kardinia International College =

Location
- Bell Post Hill, Victoria; Australia; 38.1094°S 144.3274°E

Information
- Type: private school, co-educational secondary and primary
- Motto: Wisdom leads to Respect and Friendship
- Established: 1996
- Founder: Yoshimaro Katsumata
- Principal: Catherine Lockhart
- Grades: Preschool to Year 12
- Colours: Navy blue , maroon and white
- Website: www.kardinia.vic.edu.au

Kardinia International College is a private K–12 school located in Bell Post Hill, Geelong, Victoria, Australia. It is a triple campus college, residing on the site of the former Morongo Girls' College and has two other campuses, one in Lovely Banks, Geelong and another located in Chiang Mai, Thailand. Enrolment across the school is usually around 1800 full time students.

== History ==
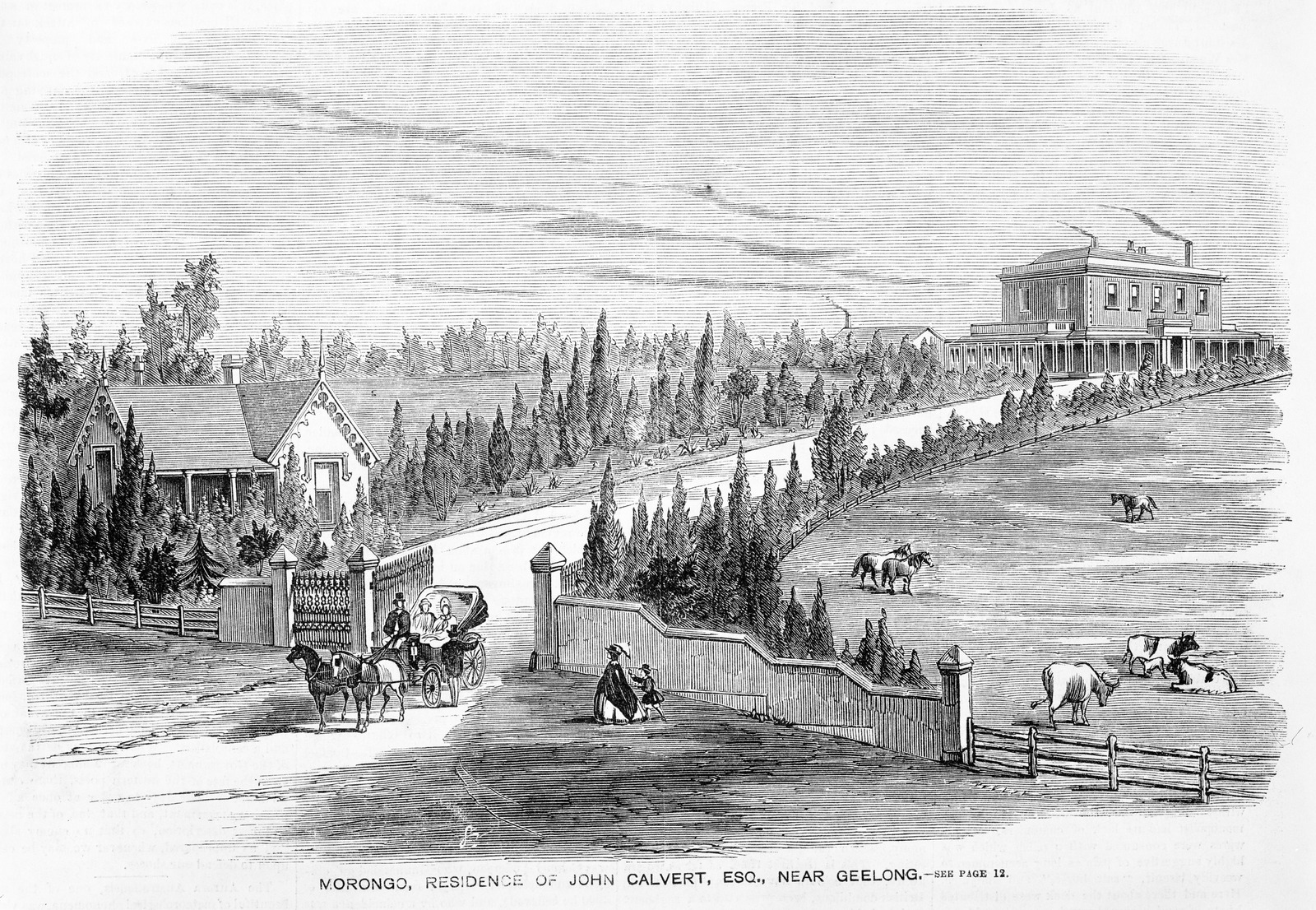
Morongo, 1863

=== Beginnings ===
Kardinia International College was founded by the late Yoshimaro Katsumata (勝間田芳麿) who purchased Morongo's buildings, grounds, facilities and resources in mid-1995. It first opened in 1996 with 31 secondary students and 42 kindergarten children. The International Baccalaureate has been implemented at the primary years level and at the Diploma level.

The word Kardinia is an Aboriginal word which means sunrise or new beginning. Kardiniyu means morning in the local Wadawurrung language.

Gotemba Nishi High School, also founded by Katsumata, is Kardinia's sister school.

The construction of a third campus and an Aquatic Centre were announced in 2015 as a part of the 20th anniversary celebrations.

In 2015, it was announced that founding principal, Mr John Goodfellow, would be retiring as principal after 20 years in the job. Mr Goodfellow remained involved with the college as a director and Sum Pun director. Mr David Fitzgerald took up the role of principal at the beginning of 2016 and continued in the role until 2018. On 1 January 2019, Catherine Lockhart became the college's third principal after being appointed from her previous role as Deputy Head at Woodcroft College in South Australia.

== Principals ==
Period	Principal
1996–2015	John Goodfellow
2016–2018	David Fitzgerald
2019–current	Catherine Lockhart

== Structure ==
The college is divided into four distinct sections:

- The Early Learning Centre incorporates a three- and four-year-old kindergarten, in addition to a pre-school.
- The Lower Primary Centre caters for prep, as well as grades one and two.
- The Upper Primary Centre contains grades three, four, five and six.
- The Senior School, for years seven to twelve.

=== Senior School ===
The Senior School utilises a vertical curriculum for years seven to ten. This system is based upon the individual choices of a student. At the beginning of each semester, students are issued with a unique timetable of seven subjects, based upon their preferences. This allows for students to focus heavily on one particular area, or elect to pursue one or more languages. This system does not allow free rein, however, with a minimum number of subjects that must be undertaken in each learning area.

For years 11 and 12, there are two options to undertake. The Victorian Certificate of Education (VCE) was first implemented in 2000, and is the main high school certificate for year 11 and 12 students in Victoria. In 2005, Kardinia offered the alternative of the International Baccalaureate Diploma. 33 students completed the International Baccalaureate in 2006. The school also implemented the International Baccalaureate Primary Years Program into the junior school. VET (Vocational Education and Training) courses are also available to students.

== House system ==
Kardinia International College has four houses to which students are allocated, each having a historical meaning.

House	Cowie	Gotemba	Morongo	Thomson
Colour	Green	Blue	Red	Yellow
Named after	The first squatter to settle on the college site.	Named after Kardinia's sister school in Japan.	The historic homestead originally built on the site in 1859.	Named after the first mayor of Geelong Alexander Thomson.

== Facilities ==
=== The Katsumata Centre ===
In 2010, a complex consisting of a gymnasium, a weights room and a theatre was established and named in honour of the school's founder, Yoshimaro Katsumata.

=== The Learning Commons ===
In 2014, a multi-purpose facility was built on location of the previous library in the centre of the senior school. The new facility consists of two buildings. The first is the Learning Commons which includes a library, IT support, offices, student study, photography rooms including a dark room, and classrooms. The second building consisting of classrooms, study rooms and staff offices.

=== The Goodfellow Aquatic Centre ===
As a part of the 20th anniversary celebrations, it was announced that an aquatic centre was to be built along Ballarat Road. The new building includes two separate swimming pools. The construction of the pool commenced in April 2015 and was completed in July 2016. The centre was officially opened by the founding principal and its namesake, John Goodfellow.

== Camps ==
Kardinia International College offers many camps for most of the senior year levels.

Year 7

Orientation Camp located at Anglesea or Warrnambool.

Year 9

Chiang Mai Experience, Thailand (6 weeks)

Discovery College Exchange Program, Hong Kong

Year 10

Outdoor Education Camp, regional Victoria

Japanese Exchange Program, Gotemba Nishi High School (12 week exchange)

Year 10 and 11

Japanese Study Tour, Japan (3 weeks)

French Study Tour, France (3 weeks)

Year 11

Viqueque, East Timor

Year 9 to 11

Duke of Edinburgh Award

Year 9 to 12

Cross Country Snow Camping, Mt Stirling

== Campuses ==
=== Chiang Mai Sum Pun ===
Sum Pun Kardinia is located in Chiang Mai, Thailand and is used for 6 week trips.

=== The Grove Campus ===
In 2015, construction began on a rural campus for year 5 students. The campus was completed in mid-2016 and includes farm animals, a learning space, veggie gardens as well as a caretaker's residence.

== Controversies ==
Several students were involved in the creation and distribution of a controversial DVD first seen in the media in October 2006. According to the college principal, one student was expelled, along with a school investigation into two other students who "may have had some involvement". These students have since been expelled.

In July 2006, music teacher Nicholas Frampton was fired by the college and had his teaching registration cancelled by the Victorian Institute of Teaching. This was a result of Frampton participating in sexually suggestive online messaging with two schoolboys aged between 13 - 14. The school did not inform parents of the removal of Frampton or the nature of his crimes; instead referring to his departure as due to "ill health".

In February 2023, one of the victims of Mr Frampton launched a lawsuit against the school due to recent news articles about alleged child sexual abuse cases towards other former teachers at Kardinia International College. The lawsuit alleges that the school intentionally did not report the sexual abuse to the relevant authorities, and that the former student was not offered support or counselling by the school after Frampton's removal.

== See also ==
- List of schools in Victoria
- List of high schools in Victoria
- Victorian Certificate of Education
