= Sacred Heart College, Geelong =

Sacred Heart College

Location
- Retreat Road; Geelong, Victoria; Australia
- Coordinates: 38°8′58″S 144°20′20″E

Information
- Type: Private
- Motto: Latin: Virtus Vera Nobilitas; Virtue is true nobility
- Denomination: Roman Catholic (Sisters of Mercy)
- Established: 1860; 166 years ago
- Sister school: Seirei Gakuen High School, Istituto San Giovanni Bosco
- Principal: Anna Negro
- Gender: Girls
- Enrollment: 1,420
- Colors: Sky blue and navy blue
- Website: www.shcgeelong.catholic.edu.au

Sacred Heart College is a Roman Catholic secondary school for girls, and is located in Retreat Road, Newtown, Geelong, Victoria in Australia. It is now one of the largest Catholic secondary girls schools in Victoria.

The current principal is Anna Negro, with three Deputy Principals: Tanya Malley, Jason Blackburn, and Mel Riley.

== History ==
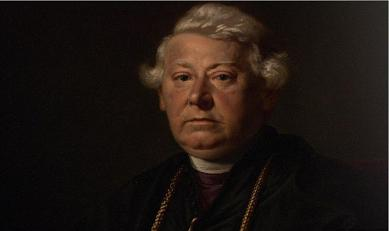
James Alipius Goold

In June 1859, the Archbishop of Melbourne, James Alipius Goold, petitioned the Sisters of Mercy in Dublin to establish a community in Geelong. Mother Mary Xavier Maguire, Mary Gabrielle Sherlock, Margaret Mullally, Joseph Manly, Rose Lynch and Novice Aloysius Ryan arrived on 3 December 1859. The sisters immediately set about providing Catholic education for all who desired it. The boarding school and day school that is now Sacred Heart College was opened for the beginning of the next school year (1860) with 12 pupils, 6 of whom were boarders. In 1861 an adjoining orphanage was opened and very soon there were 50 girls being cared for. The Sisters also staffed local parish primary schools in the area and after school hours were seen visiting the sick and aged in their homes and the hospital. Within a few years, a large convent including a chapel as well as school buildings such as classrooms and dormitories had been built. By the turn of the century the college was registered as "conducting" a junior school (kindergarten and primary) as well as a senior and boarding school.

== Alumni Association ==
In 1924, a Past Pupils' Association was formed and this became predecessor of the Old Collegians' Association established in 1932. As well as the Geelong-based committee, a Melbourne Group was formed in the 1930s and in 1981 a Western District Group was set up to bring together former students from that area, many of whom had been boarders.

The association is now known as the Alumni Association. Today, each student automatically becomes a member of the Alumni Association upon her graduation from the College.

== Notable alumni ==
- Vicki Anderson, psychologist
- Peta Credlin, political commentator, former chief of staff to then Prime Minister Tony Abbott
- Sarah Henderson, politician
- Lucy McEvoy, AFLW player
- Lily Mithen, AFLW player
- Olivia Purcell, AFLW player
- Marisa Siketa, actress
- Alice Teague-Neeld, Netballer

== Curriculum ==
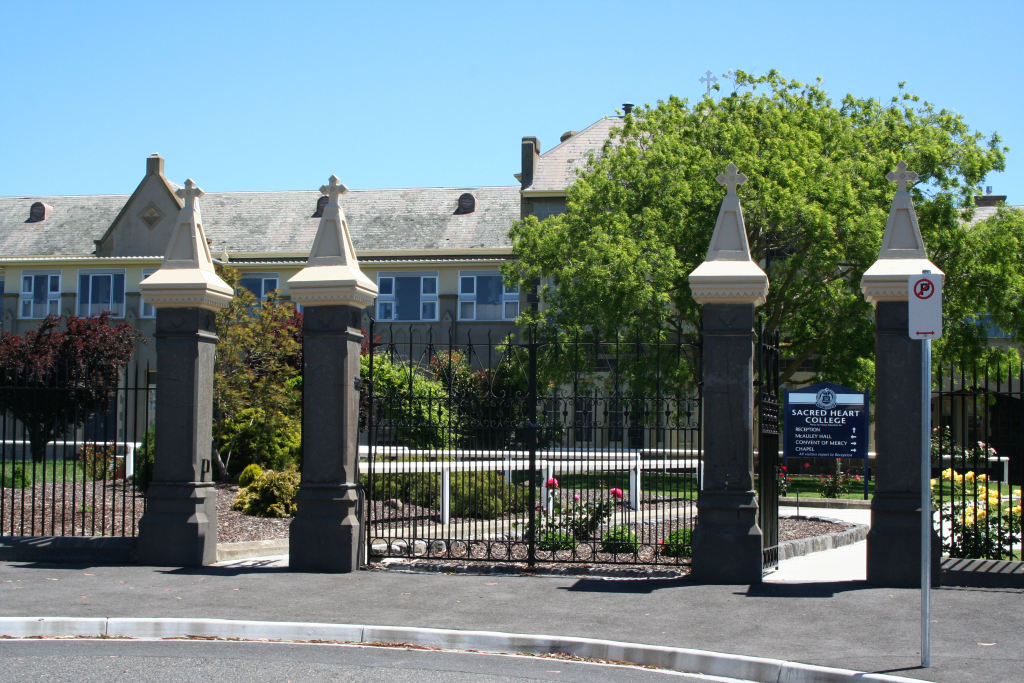
Main entry to the school on Retreat Road

Some classes are also offered at nearby school St Joseph's College at VCE level, including Chinese.

Sacred Heart College offers the Victorian Certificate of Education, and has introduced the International Baccalaureate for middle years students. Year Eleven and Twelve pupils may also choose to undertake a Vocational Education and Training or VCE Vocation Major program.

== See also ==
- Sacred Heart College (disambiguation)
- Sacred Heart
- Sisters of Mercy
