= Morongo Girls' College =

Coordinates: 38.1094°S 144.3274°E

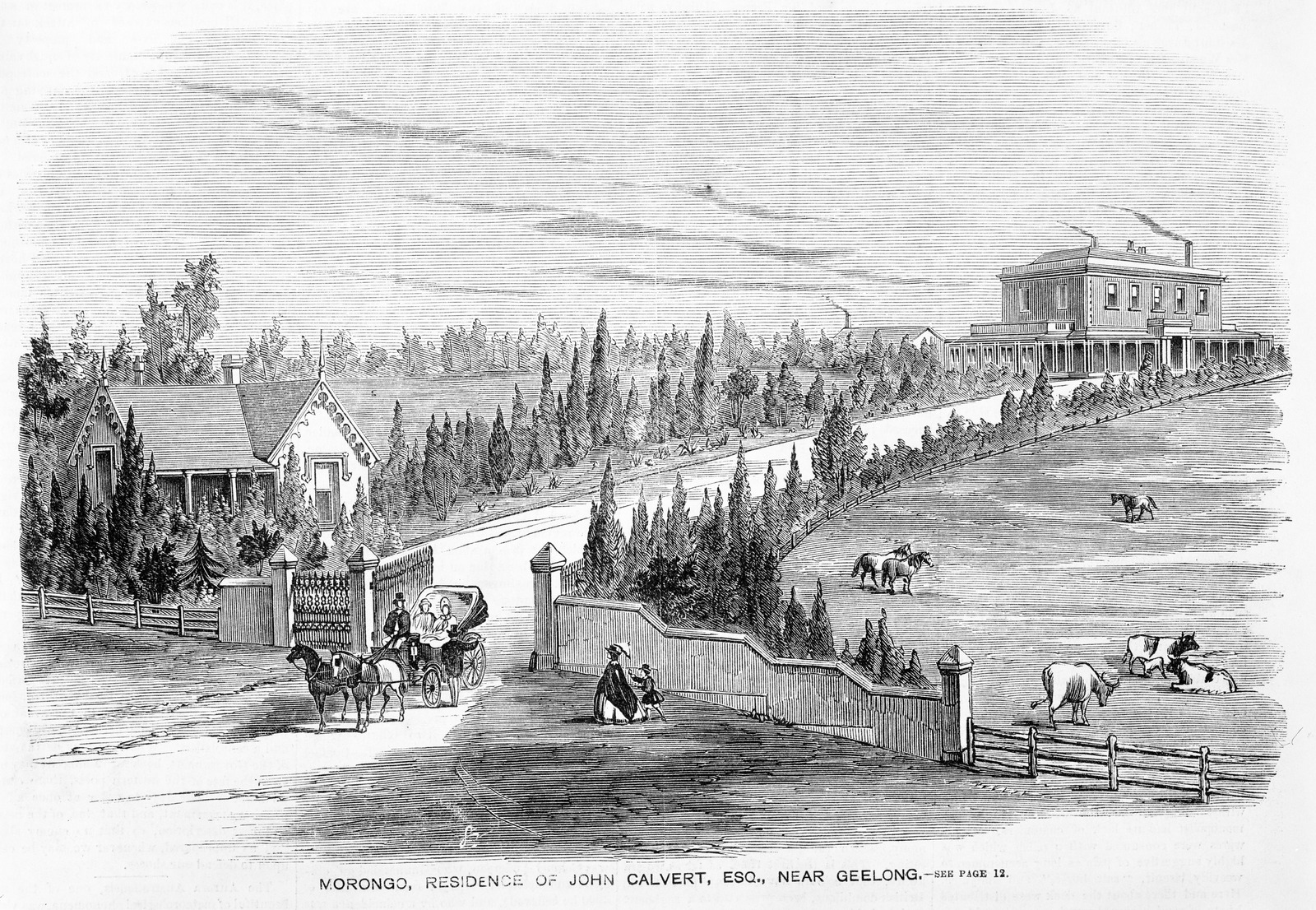
Morongo, 1863

Morongo Girls' College was a Presbyterian school for girls, founded in 1920 on Bell Post Hill near Geelong, Australia, on the site of an original homestead (called Morongo).

The founding principal was Gertrude Pratt BA, the second principal was Miss Shaw BA (Qld) MACE and Dulcie Brookshaw was the third headmistress. The fourth and final headmistress was Judith Watt.

Morongo Girls' College closed at the end of 1994, and the site is now occupied by Kardinia International College. A book on the school's history was commissioned and published by the school council in 1969.

Morongo Girls' College was associated with Geelong College. Geelong College is now the caretaker of artefacts from Morongo.

== Alumni ==
- Rebecca Maddern
- Rosemary Crossley – disability advocate
- Winsome McCaughey – Lord mayor of Melbourne

== See also ==
- List of schools in Victoria, Australia
