= Brisbane School Girls Sports Association =

The Brisbane School Girls Sports Association (BSGSA) was a group of mainly girls' schools in Brisbane, Queensland, Australia that was founded in 1996. The association grew to include 12 members and 9 associate members, both girls' and coeducational schools. The organisation was split in 2014 with most of the girls-only colleges forming the Catholic Secondary Schoolgirls' Sports Association. Many of the coeducational schools formed the South Eastern Colleges Association.

== Former member schools ==
Member college	Location	Enrolment	Founded	Denomination	Boys/girls	Day/boarding	Year entered competition	School colours
All Hallows’ School	Brisbane	1300	1861	Roman Catholic	Girls	Day		Light blue, white and rust
Brigidine College	Indooroopilly	600	1929	Roman Catholic	Girls	Day	Foundation member	Heritage green, navy and gold
Cannon Hill Anglican College	Cannon Hill	900	1989	Anglican	Boys & girls	Day		Red, royal blue and white
Carmel College	Thornlands	1250	1993	Roman Catholic	Boys & girls	Day		Navy, white and maroon
Clairvaux Mackillop College	Mt Gravatt	1300	1984	Roman Catholic	Boys & girls	Day		Maroon, gold and white
Corpus Christi College	Nundah	Defunct		Roman Catholic	Girls			Dark green, maroon and yellow
Grace Lutheran College	Redcliffe	1600	1978	Lutheran	Boys & girls	Day		Brown, white, gold and green
John Paul College	Daisy Hill	2500	1982	Ecumenical	Boys & girls	Day		Burgundy & light blue
Loreto College	Coorparoo	710	1928	Roman Catholic	Girls	Day	2009	Blue and gold
Lourdes Hill College	Hawthorne	910	1916	Roman Catholic	Girls	Day and boarding		Purple, lavender, silver and white
Mt Alvernia College	Kedron	800	1956	Roman Catholic	Girls	Day		Maroon and grey
Mt Maria College	Mitchelton		2006	Roman Catholic	Boys & girls	Day		Maroon and navy
Mt Maria Junior College	Enoggera		2006	Roman Catholic	Boys & girls	Day		Maroon and navy
Mitchelton State High	Mitchelton	530	1956	Non-denominational	Boys & girls	Day		Maroon, sky blue and white
Mount St Michael's College	Ashgrove	900	1925	Roman Catholic	Girls	Day		Navy and gold
Northside Christian College	Everton Park	1212	1985	Christian	Boys & girls	Day		Navy, dark green and white
Our Lady's College	Annerley	311	1964	Roman Catholic	Girls	Day		Dark green and gold
San Sisto College	Carina	850	1961	Roman Catholic	Girls	Day		Dark green, red and white
Sheldon College	Sheldon	1500	1997	Non-denominational	Boys & girls	Day		Navy, white, sky blue and yellow
Southern Cross College	Scarborough	1000	1995	Roman Catholic	Boys & girls	Day		Royal blue, green, white and red
St James College	Brisbane	520	1868	Roman Catholic	Boys & girls	Day		Maroon and gold
St John Fisher College	Bracken Ridge			Roman Catholic	Girls	Day		Maroon, white and sky blue
St Rita's College	Clayfield	800	1926	Roman Catholic	Girls	Day	2003	Gold, brown and white
St Thomas More College	Sunnybank	1060	1060	Roman Catholic	Boys & girls	Day		Black, gold and white
Stuartholme School	Toowong	680	1920	Roman Catholic	Girls	Day/boarding		Red, gold and blue

== Sports ==
- Cricket
- Basketball
- Football (AFL)
- Hockey
- Netball
- Soft Ball
- Soccer
- Touch Football
- Volleyball

== See also ==
- Catholic Secondary Schoolgirls' Sports Association
- List of schools in Queensland
