= Catholic Secondary Schoolgirls' Sports Association =

Sporting association in Queensland, Australia

CaSSSA
- Formation: 1930 Catholic Schools Tennis Assoc. 1996 Bris. Schoolgirls Sports Assoc. 2014 CaSSSA
- Headquarters: Brisbane, Queensland, Australia
- Members: 14 member schools

The Catholic Secondary Schoolgirls' Sports Association (CaSSSA) is a sporting association for girls from fourteen Catholic secondary schools based in south-east Queensland, Australia. Competition is offered to girls from Years 7 to 12.

The association was formed in 2014 as an amalgamation of the Catholic Secondary Girls' Schools Sports Association (CSGSSA, which organised Swimming, Athletics, and Cross country), the Catholic Schools Tennis Association (CSTA, founded in 1930) and the Brisbane School Girls Sports Association (BSGSA, founded in 1996 and organising other team sports).

The championships for Swimming, Cross Country, and Track and Field (Athletics) are split into two competitions. The larger schools (9 in total) compete for the CaSSSA Cup while the other schools (5 in total) compete for the CaSSSA Shield.

== Schools ==
=== Members ===
School	Location	Enrolment	Year founded	Denomination	Gender(s)	Day/ boarding	Entered competition	School colours
All Hallows' School	Fortitude Valley	1586	1861	Catholic	Girls	Day	2014	Light blue, white and rust
Brigidine College	Indooroopilly	852	1929	Catholic	Girls	Day	2014	Heritage green, navy and gold
Downlands College	Toowoomba	911	1931	Catholic	Girls and Boys	Day & Boarding	2014	Blue, red and gold
Loreto College	Coorparoo	901	1928	Catholic	Girls	Day	2014	Blue and gold
Lourdes Hill College	Hawthorne	1260	1916	Catholic	Girls	Day	2014	Purple, lavender, silver and white
Mary MacKillop College	Nundah	633	1964	Catholic	Girls	Day	2014	Navy, red and white
Mt Alvernia College	Kedron	950	1956	Catholic	Girls	Day	2014	Maroon and grey
Mt St Michael's College	Ashgrove	875	1929	Catholic	Girls	Day	2014	Navy and gold
Our Lady’s College	Annerley	318	1964	Catholic	Girls	Day	2014	Dark green and gold
St John Fisher College	Bracken Ridge	598	1981	Catholic	Girls	Day	2014	Maroon, white and sky blue
St Mary's College	Ipswich	686	1863	Catholic	Girls	Day	2014	Maroon, white and Mercy blue
St Rita’s College	Clayfield	1043	1926	Catholic	Girls	Day	2014	Gold, brown and white
San Sisto College	Carina	852	1961	Catholic	Girls	Day	2014	Dark green, red and white
Stuartholme School	Toowong	678	1920	Catholic	Girls	Day & Boarding	2014	Red, gold and blue

== Sports ==
A range of sports are offered during each trimester within a year.

Trimester 1
Sport	Year level
Swimming	7–12
Australian football	7–12
Touch football Volleyball	7–8; 9–12
Tennis	7–12

Trimester 2
Sport	Year level
Cross country running	7–12
Football (soccer)	7–12
Netball; Volleyball	9–12; 7–8

Trimester 3
Sport	Year level
Athletics (track and field)	7–12
Basketball	7–12
Netball; Touch football	7–8; 9–12

== See also ==
- List of schools in Queensland
- Head of the River (Queensland)
