= Sarah Worthington =

British legal academic and barrister

Dame Sarah Worthington DBE KC (Hon) FBA FRSA
- Born: Sarah Elizabeth Monks; 18 February 1955 (age 71); Barnsley, Yorkshire, England

Academic background
- Education: Australian National University; University of Queensland; University of Melbourne; Wolfson College, Cambridge
- Thesis: Proprietary interests in commercial transactions (1995)

Academic work
- Discipline: Law
- Sub-discipline: Company law; commercial law; equity; English law
- Institutions: University of Queensland; San Sisto College; Faculty of Law, University of Melbourne; Birkbeck College, University of London; London School of Economics; Trinity College, Cambridge; Faculty of Law, University of Cambridge
- Website: www.law.cam.ac.uk/people/academic/s-worthington/4277

Dame Sarah Elizabeth Worthington, DBE, KC (Hon), FBA, FRSA (née Monks; born 18 February 1955) is an English legal scholar, professor at LSE Law School, barrister, and Deputy High Court Judge in the Chancery Division, specialising in company law, commercial law, and equity. From 2011 to 2022, she was the Downing Professor of the Laws of England at the University of Cambridge. She is Treasurer of the British Academy and a trustee of the British Museum.

== Early life and education ==
The then Sarah Monks was born on 18 February 1955 in Barnsley, Yorkshire, England. Her parents moved soon after her birth to Uganda, and then to Kenya, where she lived until she was 8 years old. They then moved to Australia. She studied natural science and mathematics at the Australian National University, graduating with a Bachelor of Science (BSc) degree in 1974. From 1975 to 1976, she was a doctoral candidate at the University of Queensland, undertaking cancer research; she left without completing. In 1977, while training to be a teacher, she completed a Graduate Diploma in Education at the University of Queensland.

Worthington changed directions, going from science to law. Having studied part-time, she graduated from the University of Queensland with a first class Bachelor of Laws (LLB) degree in 1986. She completed a Master of Laws (LLM) degree at the University of Melbourne in 1990. She undertook postgraduate research in law at Wolfson College, Cambridge, and completed her Doctor of Philosophy (PhD) degree in 1995. Her doctoral thesis was titled "Proprietary interests in commercial transactions".

== Career ==
=== Scientific career ===
Worthington's early career was in science. From 1974 to 1977, she was a departmental tutor in the Biochemistry Department of the University of Queensland. From 1978 to 1979, she was a senior science teacher at San Sisto College, an all-girls Catholic school in Brisbane, Queensland.

=== Academic career ===
Worthington's legal career began in 1988 as a lecturer in law in the Faculty of Law of the University of Melbourne. She then spent time in Moscow, Russia, before moving back to England in 1994. Having joined the Department of Law of Birkbeck College, London, she was a lecturer from 1994 to 1996, and a senior lecturer from 1996 to 1997.

Worthington then moved to the London School of Economics (LSE) where she was a senior lecturer from 1997 to 2001, a Reader in Law from 2001 to 2003, and Professor of Law from 2003 to 2011. She was additionally a Pro-Director of LSE (with responsibility for research and external relations) between 2005 and 2010.

In 2011, Worthington moved to the University of Cambridge where she had been appointed the Downing Professor of the Laws of England and elected a Fellow of Trinity College, Cambridge. Upon arrival at Cambridge, she set up the Cambridge Private Law Centre and now serves as its director. She retired from the Downing Professorship in 2022.

Worthington has held a number of visiting appointments. She has been a Professorial Fellow of the University of Melbourne since 2005. From 2009 to 2010, she held the Francqui Chair at the University of Leuven. From 2010 to 2015, she was Cheng Yu Tong Distinguished Visiting Professor at the University of Hong Kong. Since 2012, she has been a Distinguished Fellow of the Australian Centre for Private Law of TC Beirne School of Law, University of Queensland.

=== Legal career ===
On 10 March 2005, Worthington was Called to the Bar at Middle Temple, thereby becoming a barrister. She was President of The Society of Legal Scholars from 2008 to 2009. On 12 October 2010, she was made a Bencher of Middle Temple. She is an academic member of 3/4 South Square, a set of commercial barristers. She was made an honorary Queen's Counsel in 2010.

== Personal life ==
In 1978, Sarah Elizabeth Monks married Peter Worthington. Together they have four children: two sons and two daughters.

== Honours ==
In 2009, Worthington was elected a Fellow of the British Academy (FBA), the United Kingdom's national academy for the humanities and social sciences. She is an overseas Fellow of the Australian Academy of the Law (FAAL). In February 2010, she was appointed Queen's Counsel (Honoris Causa) and thereby granted the post-nominal letters "QC (Hon)". She became a member of Academia Europaea in 2012.

She was appointed Dame Commander of the Order of the British Empire (DBE) in the 2020 Birthday Honours for services to English private law.

== Selected works ==
- Worthington, Sarah (1996). Proprietary Interests in Commercial Transactions. Oxford: Clarendon Press. ISBN 978-0198262756.
- Worthington, Sarah (2000). Personal Property Law: Text and Materials. Oxford: Hart. ISBN 978-1901362442.
- Worthington, Sarah, ed. (2003). Commercial Law and Commercial Practice. Oxford: Hart. ISBN 978-1841134383.
- Worthington, Sarah (2006). Equity (2nd ed.). Oxford: Oxford University Press. ISBN 978-0199290505.
- Worthington, Sarah (2009). Equity and property: fact, fantasy and morals. St Lucia, Qld.: University of Queensland Press. ISBN 978-0702237263.
- Davies, Paul L.; Worthington, Sarah (2012). Gower & Davies: Principles of Modern Company Law (9th ed.). London: Sweet & Maxwell. ISBN 978-0414022720.
- Bridge, Michael; Gullifer, Louise; McMeel, Gerard; Worthington, Sarah (2013). The Law of Personal Property. London: Sweet & Maxwell. ISBN 978-1847037992.
- Sealy, Len; Worthington, Sarah (2013). Sealy & Worthington's Cases and Materials in Company Law (10th ed.). Oxford: Oxford University Press. ISBN 978-0199676446.
- Worthington, Sarah (2016). Sealy & Worthington's Cases and Materials in Company Law (11th ed.). Oxford: Oxford University Press. ISBN 978-0198722052.
- Davies, Paul L.; Worthington, Sarah (2016). Gower & Davies: Principles of Modern Company Law (10th ed.). London: Sweet & Maxwell. ISBN 978-0414056268.
