= Mount Alvernia College =

Location
- 82 Cremorne Road; Kedron, Queensland, 4031; Australia; 27.405545°S 153.027497°E

Information
- Type: Independent secondary school
- Motto: Latin: Deus Meus Et Omnia (My God, My All)
- Denomination: Franciscan
- Established: 22 April 1956; 70 years ago
- Principal: Samantha Jensen
- Years: 7–12
- Gender: Girls
- Colours: Maroon and grey
- Affiliation: Catholic Secondary Schoolgirls' Sports Association
- Website: www.mta.qld.edu.au

Mount Alvernia College is an independent Roman Catholic secondary school for girls located in the Brisbane suburb of Kedron, in the state of Queensland, Australia. It was founded in 1956 by the Missionary Franciscan Sisters of the Immaculate Conception.

Mount Alvernia is a member of the Catholic Secondary Schoolgirls' Sports Association.

== Overview ==
Mount Alvernia's mission statement is "Educating young women in the Franciscan tradition". Academic, cultural, spiritual, and outreach programs are based upon the Franciscan values of love, compassion, simplicity, peace, joy, trust in God, respect, and service.

The College has seven buildings housing state-of-the-art science, sporting, arts, technology, and home economics facilities. The school grounds also feature a garden, La Foresta, that is both decorative and functional, providing fresh produce for use in the canteen (affectionately known by its students as 'La Cucina'), and home economics classes. As of December 2025, construction began on a new building. 'The Canticle', named after St Francis's Canticle of the Sun. After several delays, it is set to be completed in early 2027.

Prior to 2015, the College separated students into four house groups: Greccio, Perugia, Rieti, and Spoleto. When the first cohort of Year 7 students entered the College in 2015, two new houses were introduced: Villa Spada and Belle Prairie. Each house is named after a significant location in the lives of St Francis of Assisi and founder of the Missionary Franciscan Sisters of the Immaculate Conception, Elizabeth Hayes.

Mount Alvernia is adjacent to two other Franciscan schools: primary school St Anthony's and Padua College, a Year 5–12 school for boys. The three schools are known collectively as Franciscans on the Hill (FOTH). Padua College and Mount Alvernia College regularly put on musical theatre productions, the most recent of which being smash hits in the local community - 'We Will Rock You' in 2021, 'Legally Blonde: The Musical!' in 2023, and 'Mamma Mia!' in 2025.

The College is operated by Mercy Partners and is a member of the Franciscan Schools Australia network.

In 2026, the College celebrated its 70th anniversary.

== Appearances (Media) ==
Mount Alvernia College has appeared on Australian Television a number of times, most notably on the programs 'Gardening Australia', and 'The Swap'.

A student led podcast, aptly named 'Beyond the Bell', was launched by the school captains in 2026.

They regularly post videos on their YouTube, Instagram, and Facebook pages.
