= Romilly Madew =

Australian business manager

Romilly Jane Madew AO FTSE (née Evans; born ca. 1966) is an Australian business executive who specialises in sustainable building practices and infrastructure strategy. As of June 2024 she is chief executive officer of Engineers Australia.

== Early life and education ==
Romilly Jane Madew, then Evans, completed her secondary education at Presbyterian Ladies' College Pymble in 1984.

She subsequently graduated from the University of Sydney with a Bachelor of Agricultural Economics.

== Career ==
In 1994 Madew moved to Canberra to work for Mallesons Stephen Jaques in their property department. From there she moved to the Property Council of Australia as executive director of its ACT office in 2002.

Madew was CEO of the Green Building Council of Australia from 2006 to 2019. She was appointed CEO of Infrastructure Australia in April 2019.

In May 2022 she was appointed CEO of Engineers Australia. As of June 2024 she is still in this position.

== Other activities ==
She is one of the co-founders of the Minerva Network, an organisation of businesswomen who mentor women athletes. She has served on the board of both Chief Executive Women and Bilgola Beach Surf Life Saving Club.

== Honours and recognition ==
Madew won the 2009 Telstra White Pages Community and Government award for New South Wales.

In the 2019 Australia Day Honours Madew was appointed Officer of the Order of Australia for "distinguished service to the construction sector as a change agent and advocate for sustainable building practices".

She was elected Fellow of the Australian Academy of Technology and Engineering in October 2019.

== Personal ==
Madew is married to David Madew. They have three children.
