= Brigidine College, Indooroopilly =

Location
- Indooroopilly, Brisbane, Queensland; Australia
- Coordinates: 27°30′02″S 152°58′49″E

Information
- Type: Independent secondary day school
- Motto: Latin: Fortiter Et Suaviter (Strength and Gentleness)
- Religious affiliation(s): Congregation of the Sisters of Saint Brigid
- Denomination: Roman Catholic
- Established: 1929; 96 years ago
- Principal: Brendan Cahill
- Years: 5–12
- Gender: Girls
- Enrolment: c. 700 (2015)
- Colour(s): Heritage green, navy blue, golden yellow
- Affiliations: Association of Heads of Independent Schools of Australia; Alliance of Girls' Schools Australasia; Catholic Secondary Schoolgirls' Sports Association
- Website: www.brigidine.qld.edu.au

Brigidine College is an independent Roman Catholic secondary day school for girls, located in the suburb of Indooroopilly less than 8 kilometres (5.0 mi) from the centre of Brisbane, Queensland, Australia. It was established in 1929 by the Congregation of the Sisters of Saint Brigid and continues in their tradition of Strength and Gentleness today.

It is affiliated with the Association of Heads of Independent Schools of Australia (AHISA), the Alliance of Girls' Schools Australasia (AGSA), and the Catholic Secondary Schoolgirls' Sports Association(CaSSSA).

== History ==
The College was founded by the Brigidine Sisters in 1929. The school motto – French: Fortiter et Suaviter, lit. 'Strength and Gentleness', is reflected in every aspect of the school's activities and policies. During 2014, a number of celebrations were held to mark the school's 85 year anniversary including:

- The new Foley House, blessed as the sixth House.
- The new Middle Years Learning Centre, with specialist facilities for Years 7–9, opened.
- A Whole School Photo marking the largest enrolment of students in the College's 85-year history.
- The Kildare Ministries was launched. The establishment of this Public Juridic Person includes the educational services and community works of both the Brigidine Sisters Australia and Presentation Sisters Victoria. Brigidine College is now under the care of Kildare Ministries in the tradition of the Brigidine Sisters.

== House system ==
There are six Houses at Brigidine College:

- Chanel (Red House, named after Saint Peter Chanel) symbol: flame
- Delany (Gold House, named after Daniel Delany) symbol: lion
- Damien (Blue House, named after Damien de Veuster) symbol: eagle
- De Porres (Green House, named after Saint Martin de Porres) symbol: dragon
- MacKillop (Jacaranda House, named after Mary MacKillop) symbol: phoenix
- Foley (Magenta House, named after Mother Brigid Foley, the foundation Principal) symbol: Love Heart

Each house is led by two House Captains, who are also known as Prefects. Each girl's House is like her 'family' at school.

== Notable Alumnae ==
- Melissa Andreatta, Soccer Coach
- Nat Grider, AFLW player
- Grace Harris, cricketer
- Rhianna Patrick, Radio Presenter
- Georgie Tunny, journalist

== See also ==
- List of schools in Queensland
- Catholic education in Australia
