= Julieanne Alroe =

Australian aviation industry executive

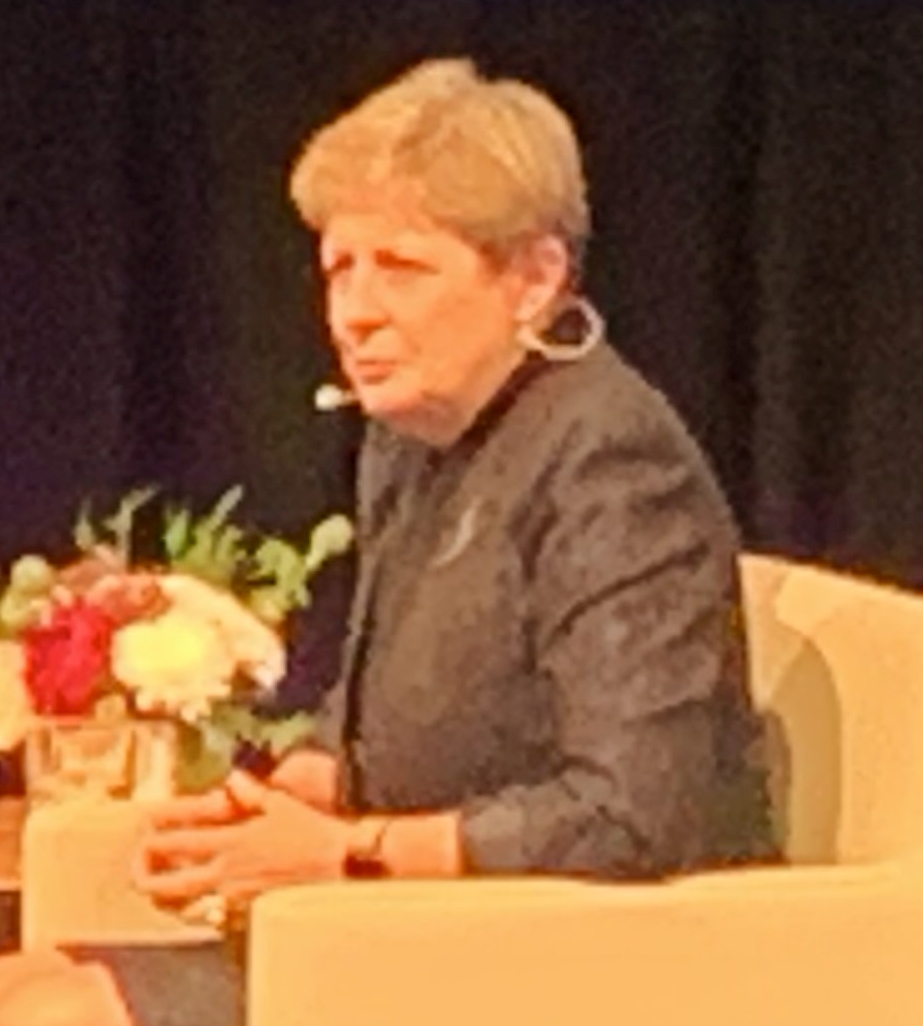
Julieanne Alroe being interviewed at State Library of Queensland at part of their Game Changers series, 27 November 2018

Julieanne Alroe is an Australian business executive and leader in the Australian aviation industry. She has over 40 years of experience in the aviation and one of the few women to have run a privatised airport. She planned the $1.3 billion development of Brisbane's parallel runway, one of the largest infrastructure projects in Australia. Since 2017, she is the Chair of Infrastructure Australia.

== Early life ==
Alroe attended St Rita's College in Clayfield, Brisbane. She completed a Bachelor of Economics at the University of Queensland.

== Career ==
From 1981, Alroe commenced employment at Sydney Airport as an assistant director.

From 2009 to 2018, she was Chief Executive Officer and Managing Director of Brisbane Airport Corporation, the operator of Brisbane Airport.

She received an honorary doctorate from Griffith University in 2016 for her outstanding contribution to the aviation industry.

== Board roles ==
- University of Queensland Senate
- Council of Governors of the American Chamber of Commerce QLD
- Tourism and Events Queensland (Deputy Chair)
- Infrastructure Australia (Chair)

== Personal life ==
Alroe is married and has a son.
