= St Rita's College, Clayfield =

St Rita's College

Location
- 41 Enderley Road, Clayfield, Brisbane, Queensland, Australia
- Coordinates: 27°25′31″S 153°03′20″E

Information
- Type: Independent single-sex secondary day school
- Motto: Latin: Virtute Non Verbis (Action Not Words)
- Religious affiliation: Presentation Sisters
- Denomination: Roman Catholicism
- Patron saint: St Rita of Cascia
- Established: 1926; 100 years ago
- Principal: Maree Trims
- Grades: 5–12
- Enrolment: 1203 (in 2023)
- Colours: Brown and white
- Mascot: Rita Roar
- Publication: Verbis (fortnightly newsletter)
- Yearbook: The College Annual
- Affiliation: Catholic Secondary Schoolgirls' Sports Association
- Website: www.stritas.qld.edu.au

St Rita's College is an independent Roman Catholic single-sex secondary day school for girls, located in Clayfield, Brisbane, Queensland, Australia.

The school was founded in 1926 and follows in the tradition of the Presentation Sisters, founded by Nano Nagle, and , as at 2023, had 1203 students enrolled in Years 5–12. St Rita's is a member of the Catholic Secondary Schoolgirls' Sports Association.

The school's motto is Latin, Virtute Non Verbis, which translates to English as Deeds Not Words.

== History ==
St Rita's College was founded by two Presentation Sisters, Sister Alice Kennedy and Sister Mary Madden, and was established as a kindergarten through to senior school on 27 September 1926. The initial enrolment consisted of 16 students with kindergarten – grade 3 being co-educational and grade 4 – senior girls only. Boarders were accepted from all grades.

By 1960, the primary school grades of St Rita's had been transferred to St Agatha's Primary School on the adjacent site. By 1970, St Rita's College no longer offered a boarding facility to its students.

== Notable alumnae ==
- Julieanne Alroe, CEO of Brisbane Airport, chair of Infrastructure Australia
- Eloise Amberger, Olympian, Synchronised Swimming
- Abbie Chatfield, 2019 Bachelor Australia runner-up, social media celebrity
- Sophie Conway, Australian rules footballer with Brisbane Lions
- Kate McCarthy, sportsperson with Queensland Cricket and Brisbane Lions
- Georgia Prestwidge, Brisbane Heat cricket team
