= Loreto College Coorparoo =

Location
- Coorparoo, Brisbane, Queensland; Australia; 27°30′33″S 153°03′46.50″E

Information
- Type: Independent secondary day school
- Motto: Latin: Cruci Dum Spiro Fido (While I Live, I Believe in the Cross)
- Religious affiliation: Institute of the Blessed Virgin Mary
- Denomination: Roman Catholic
- Established: 1928; 98 years ago
- Principal: Kim Wickham
- Staff: ~81
- Years: 5–12; (1–12 until 1977)
- Gender: Girls; Boys (until 1977, primary school only)
- Enrolment: c. 800
- Colours: Royal blue and gold
- Affiliation: Association of Heads of Independent Schools of Australia; Catholic Secondary Schoolgirls' Sports Association
- Website: www.loreto.qld.edu.au

Loreto College Coorparoo is an independent Roman Catholic secondary day school for girls, located in the inner-southside Brisbane suburb of Coorparoo, in Queensland, Australia. Loreto College Coorparoo has a non-selective enrolment policy and currently caters for approximately 800 girls.

The school is affiliated with the Association of Heads of Independent Schools of Australia (AHISA). Loreto College Coorparoo is one of many around the world established by the Institute of the Blessed Virgin Mary, or Loreto Sisters, founded some 400 years ago by Mary Ward. In total there are seven Loreto schools across Australia, in Melbourne, Ballarat, Adelaide, Brisbane, Perth and two in Sydney.

Until 1977 the school educated primary school aged children, including boys. The school closed to boarders in 1979.

== Houses ==
As with most Australian schools, Loreto has a house system to facilitate school based competitions and activities. The school currently has four houses, named after influential women within the Institute of the Blessed Virgin Mary:

- Barry (Gold, named after Mother Gonzaga Barry)
- Mornane (Green, named after Mother Stanislas Mornane)
- Mulhall (Red, named after Mother Stanislas Mulhall)
- Ward (Blue, named after Mary Ward)

There are a number of important inter-house events during the year, including athletics, cross- country and swimming carnivals. There are also select activities involving the performing arts.

== Co-curricular ==
School activities include: water polo, basketball, volleyball, hockey, netball, touch football, AFL, drama club, debating, robotics, music ensembles, optiminds, and the Kokoda challenge.

Competitive sports are played as part of the Catholic Secondary Schoolgirls' Sports Association competitions.

Musical activities and ensembles include and orchestra, concert band, choir and chorale, Sorelle and Exit Stage Left (soul/funk bands), jazz ensemble, guitar ensembles, flute ensembles, percussion ensembles, string ensembles, clarinet ensembles and a brass ensemble.

There are also a number of co-curricular activities and clubs within the college, including:

- Charities: including Interact, the St Vincent de Paul Society, and a Caritas Justice Group
- Creative and Performing Arts: including a Junior Drama Club, a Sound and Lighting Crew, an Art Club, a Computer Club, and a Dance Club
- Literary Groups: including a Languages Club, Debating, Public speaking, and Junior (Year 8) and Communications Council (Year 12 only)

== Notable alumni ==
- Brianna Carpenter – Australian Idol finalist 2007
- Mary Maguire – actress

== See also ==
- List of schools in Queensland
- Catholic education in Australia
- Girl's school
