= Rhianna Patrick =

Australian radio announcer (born 1977)

Rhianna Patrick (born 1977) is a Torres Strait Islander radio personality who was born in Brisbane and lived in Weipa as a child, moving to Brisbane aged 10. She has a Bachelor of Arts from the University of Queensland in 1999 with a double major in journalism. She has worked in radio and television.

== Career ==
While studying she worked at 4AAA Indigenous Radio Station as the Breakfast announcer for nearly three years and also as the rugby reporter on the station's sports show. In 2002 she joined the ABC in Sydney as a cadet and spent a year in Mackay. She returned to Sydney in 2004 working as newsreader in the Triple J News Team for the ABC where she has continued her career in radio and television.

She worked on the Indigenous television program Message Stick in various roles including as an Associate Producer/Researcher.

She produced, directed and wrote A Close Shave (2002) a documentary on a young Torres Strait Islander boy; directed Coming of the Light (2006); wrote Troubled Waters (2007) and was co-writer of Stylin'up (2007) all part of the Message Stick series

For 5 years until early 2014 Patrick hosted Speaking Out on radio. Then she moved to Brisbane until mid-April to act as stand-in host of Afternoon in south-east Queensland.

She was also presenting stories on Awaye! Radio Nationals indigenous arts and culture radio programme in 2014. In 2017 she presented a radio series on Sunday evenings which included the discussion of films, music, nostalgia, and current news topics and playing music.

Rhianna Patrick was on the program to appear at two events for the 2017 Brisbane Writers Festival in Brisbane, Queensland, Australia.

== Private life ==
She is married to David White, the former producer of Speaking Out.
