= Infrastructure Australia =

Government project assessment agency

Statutory authority overview
- Formed: 9 April 2008
- Jurisdiction: Commonwealth of Australia
- Headquarters: Sydney
- Statutory authority executive: Adam Copp, CEO
- Parent department: Department of Infrastructure and Regional Development
- Key document: Infrastructure Australia Act 2008
- Website: www.infrastructureaustralia.gov.au

Infrastructure Australia is an independent statutory body providing independent research and advice to all levels of government and industry on projects and reforms relating to investment in Australian infrastructure. It advocates for reforms on issues including financing, delivering and operating infrastructure and how to better plan and use Australia's infrastructure networks.

Infrastructure Australia also maintains the Infrastructure Priority List. This is a prioritisation process that is intended to ensure that there is a single pipeline for the evaluation and prioritisation of nationally significant infrastructure projects.

== Governance ==
Infrastructure Australia was established in July 2008 to provide advice to the Australian Government under the Infrastructure Australia Act 2008. In 2014, the Infrastructure Australia Act 2008 was amended to give Infrastructure Australia new powers, and to create an independent board with the right to appoint its own chief executive officer. The amended Act came into effect on 1 September 2014.

The new Infrastructure Australia Board was formed in September 2014. Mark Birrell retired from his role as Chairman of Infrastructure Australia in August 2017, and Julieanne Alroe was appointed to the position in September 2017. Alroe and the 12 members brought experience from business, academia, the public and private sectors. In January 2019, Romilly Madew was appointed as CEO and served until August 2022 when Adam Copp was elevated to an interim CEO role, until being formally appointed as CEO in July 2023.

The authority is part of the Department of Infrastructure, Transport, Regional Development, Communications and the Arts, and Catherine King, has been the responsible minister since May 2022.

== See also ==
- Transport in Australia

== Sources ==
- Benson, Simon (25 February 2017). "$60bn Infrastructure Wishlist to Save our Cities". The Australian.
- Jenny Wiggins Infrastructure Australia says tax land not property to capture value. The Australian Financial Review, 14 December 2016.
- Millar, Royce; Schneiders, Ben (14 May 2016). "Transurban: the making of a monster". The Age.
- "Transurban pushes for user pays road funding model". The Age. 9 September 2016.
