= Belle Prairie =

Belle Prairie may refer to one of the following places in the United States:

- Belle Prairie City, Illinois
- Belle Prairie Township, Livingston County, Illinois
- Belle Prairie Township, Morrison County, Minnesota
- Belle Prairie Township, Fillmore County, Nebraska
