= Kedron, Queensland =

Kedron
- Suburb
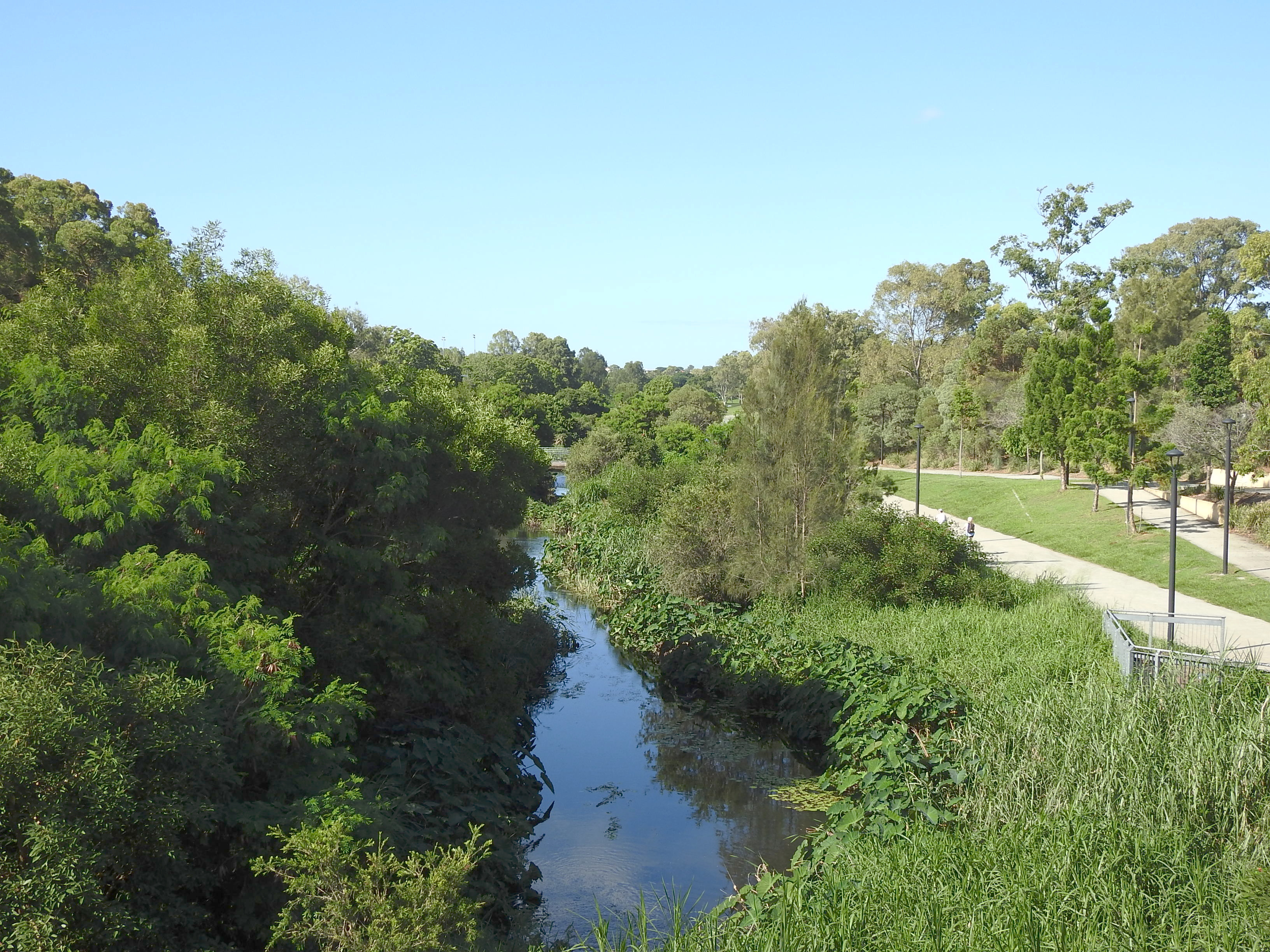
- Kedron Brook

- Interactive map of Kedron
- Coordinates: 27.4041°S 153.0319°E
- Country: Australia
- State: Queensland
- City: Brisbane
- LGA: City of Brisbane (Marchant Ward; Northgate Ward)
- Location: 11.0 km (6.8 mi) N of Brisbane CBD

Government
  - State electorate: Stafford
  - Federal division: Lilley

Area
  - Total: 3.5 km^{2} (1.4 sq mi)
- Elevation: 27 m (89 ft)

Population
  - Total: 9,907 (2021 census)
  - Density: 2,830/km^{2} (7,330/sq mi)
- Time zone: UTC+10:00 (AEST)
- Postcode: 4031
Suburbs around Kedron
Chermside West	Chermside	Wavell Heights
Stafford Heights	Kedron	Kalinga
Stafford	Gordon Park	Lutwyche; Wooloowin

Kedron (/kɛdrən/ KED-rən) is a northern suburb in the City of Brisbane, Queensland, Australia. It is home to the Queensland Fire and Emergency Services headquarters. In the 2021 census, Kedron had a population of 9,907 people.

== Geography ==
Kedron is centered on Gympie Road and Kedron Brook. It is close to Westfield Chermside shopping centre in the neighbouring suburb of Chermside. Kedron is an inner-northern suburb that neighbours Stafford, Chermside, Wavell Heights, Wooloowin, Lutwyche, and Nundah. Despite the similarity in names, the Brisbane suburbs of Kedron and Upper Kedron are 15.3 kilometres apart.

== History ==
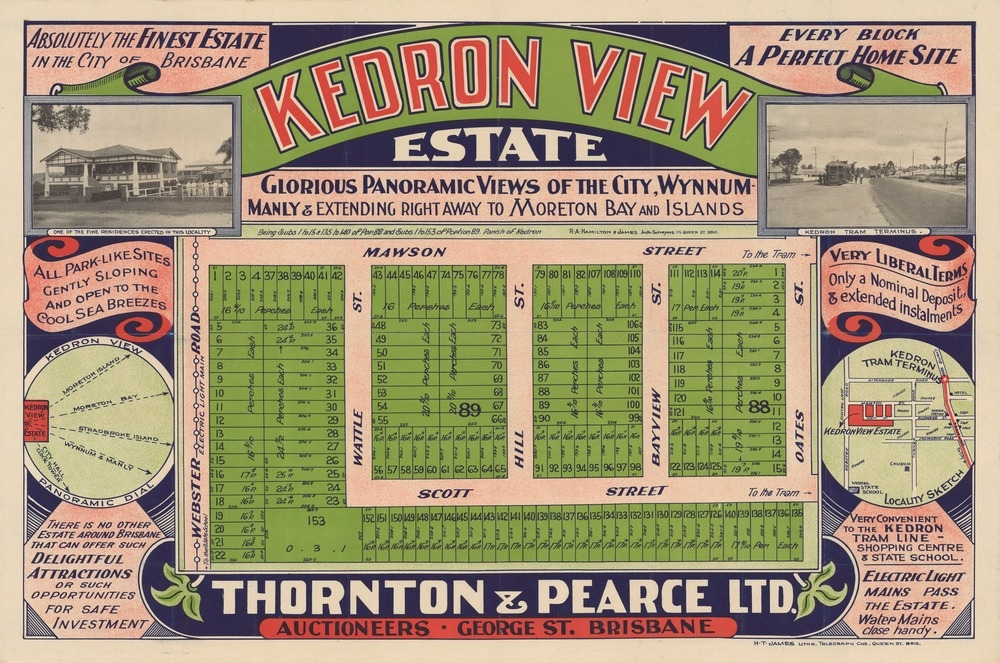
Real estate map of Kedron View Estate, circa 1914

German missionaries originally settled in the Nundah area (known as German Station) in 1838. These missionaries were granted 500 acres (2.0 km^{2}) alongside the creek they named Kedron Brook, after Kidron Valley near Jerusalem. The suburb takes its name from the creek.

The first land sales commenced in 1857. Alexander and Amelia Barron settled in the area in 1856. James and Claude Barron worked as a blacksmiths on the corner of Gympie and Stafford Roads.

Alfred Lutwyche, Queensland's first judge, purchased 50 acres (20 ha) in 1862. He named his residence Kedron Lodge. This heritage-listed residence is located on the border between Kedron and Wooloowin and is now considered part of the affluent Kalinga district of Wooloowin.

In 1864/1865, Henry Craig settled on land now occupied by Lutwyche Cemetery. He planted the large bunya pines along Gympie Road and lived there until his death in 1877. The cemetery was established in 1878 and was originally named Kedron Brook Cemetery. It was later renamed Lutwyche Cemetery to commemorate Alfred Lutwyche.

William Shaw and family arrived in 1865 and constructed the family residence "Shaw Villa" overlooking Kedron Brook.

On 30 November 1866, the locality's first church, St. Andrew's Church of England, was established.

When gold was discovered in Gympie in 1868, a bridge was constructed over the Kedron Brook to permit an alternative northerly route. This route would become known as Gympie Road. In 1868, the Edinburgh Castle Hotel was built by George Orr. The hotel was originally situated on the opposite side of Edinburgh Castle Road. A new brick hotel was completed in 1892. It was demolished in 1959 and yet other structure built on the site.

The Kedron Park Hotel was established by Frederick Morris in 1881.

In 1887, Michael Gallagher and family established the Kedron Tannery, which was very successful and became known Australia-wide.

Paul Maggs and family settled in the 1860s. In 1889 he built the Edinburgh Tannery alongside Kedron Creek at the end of Nundah Street.

The Kedron Park was set aside along Kedron Brook, adjacent to the Kedron Park Hotel. It once contained the Kedron Park Racecourse. In 1888 shares were offered in the Kedron Park Racecourse and Sports Ground Co Ltd. A formal race program was held in 1889 but saw little use in the following years. James Sharp purchased the racecourse in 1911 and changed many hands before it was finally closed in 1931 following a Royal Commission into racing. In 1955, Kedron Park was resumed for educational building purposes. The Kedron Park Teachers College, then Queensland University of Technology, and now Queensland State Emergency Service has occupied the site.

In 1891, John and Abigail King's general store was built on Gympie Road opposite the intersection with Somerset Road. In the early 1890s, King became the first postmaster for Kedron, adopted the name Kedron for the locality. The name was not officially recognised until 1901.

In 1904, Part of Kedron, Lutwyche and Wooloowin were incorporated into the Town of Windsor.

In 1913, the Presbyterian Church was established and gained full church status in 1945.

In 1914, the tram service was extended from Windsor to the Kedron Park Hotel. It was further extended to the Lutwyche Cemetery in 1925.

On Sunday 2 September 1923, the Catholic Church was officially opened by Archbishop James Duhig.

In 1925, the Methodist Church was established. First services were held in the Wintergarden Theatre.

In September 1925, approximately 55 to 96 residential allotments of the second section of "Kedron View Estate" were advertised to be auctioned by Cameron Bros, being subdivisions of portion 87 in the Parish of Kedron. A map advertising the auction includes a locality map of the area and states the allotments were within 5 minutes' walk of the new tram terminus, with electric lights at the corner of Turner and Richmond Roads, and water mains in Richmond Road.

In April 1926, approximately 75 allotments of "Scriven's Paddock" (being subdivisions 1 to 38, 43 to 70, and 75, of portion 141 in the Parish of Kedron), described as "parklike blocks," were advertised to be auctioned by Isles, Love & Co Limited. A map advertising the auction includes a local sketch of the area and states the allotments were situated on Kitchener Road, off Main Gympie Road within 3 minutes of the Kedron Tram Terminus.

In April 1928, 31 allotments of the "Richmond Estate" were advertised to be auctioned by Isles, Love, & Co Limited, being resubdivisions of portion 101 in the Parish of Kedron. A map advertising the auction includes a locality map of the area and states the allotments were within a few chains of the Kedron Tramline and close to the shopping centre, schools, and churches.

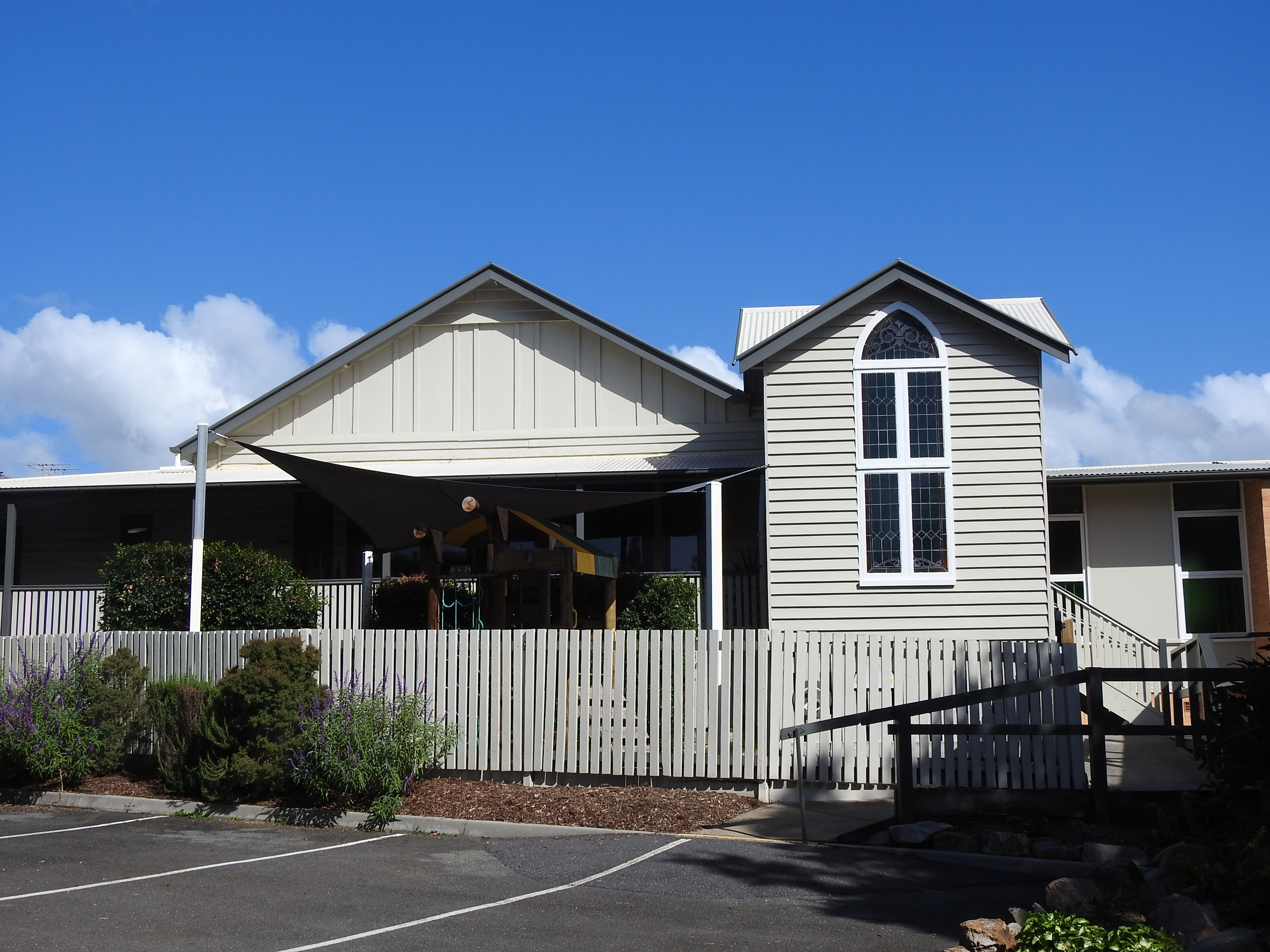
Kedron Church of Christ, 2021

In April 1929, the Albion congregation of the Church of Christ initiated a six-week mission in a large tent at Kedron. It was very successful, achieving 147 "total conversions" and raising £300. Land was purchased on Gympie Road to establish a permanent church, which was built by volunteer labour on two successive Saturdays, 18 and 25 May 1929 with the first service held on 2 June 1929. In 1934, the church was altered. In 1959, the 1929 building was relocated to the rear of the land to enable the current building to be constructed. In the early 1950s, the Kedron church commenced outreach in Stafford resulting in the establishment of the Church of Christ in that suburb. The 1959 church had its foundation stone laid on 20 June 1959 and it opened on 21 November 1959. In 1992, the Kedron and Albion congregations merged to form the Brisbane North Church of Christ, operating from the Kedron site.

On 1 October 1926, Kedron State School enrolled 171 students, officially opening the following day 2 October 1926 with classes commencing on Monday 4 October 1926 with 216 students and four teachers.

St Anthony's and St Therese's Catholic School was officially opened by Archbishop Duhig on Sunday 26 January 1930, ten days after the arrival of the three Missionary Franciscan Sisters of the Immaculate Conception who were to run the school. There were 80 students on the opening day.

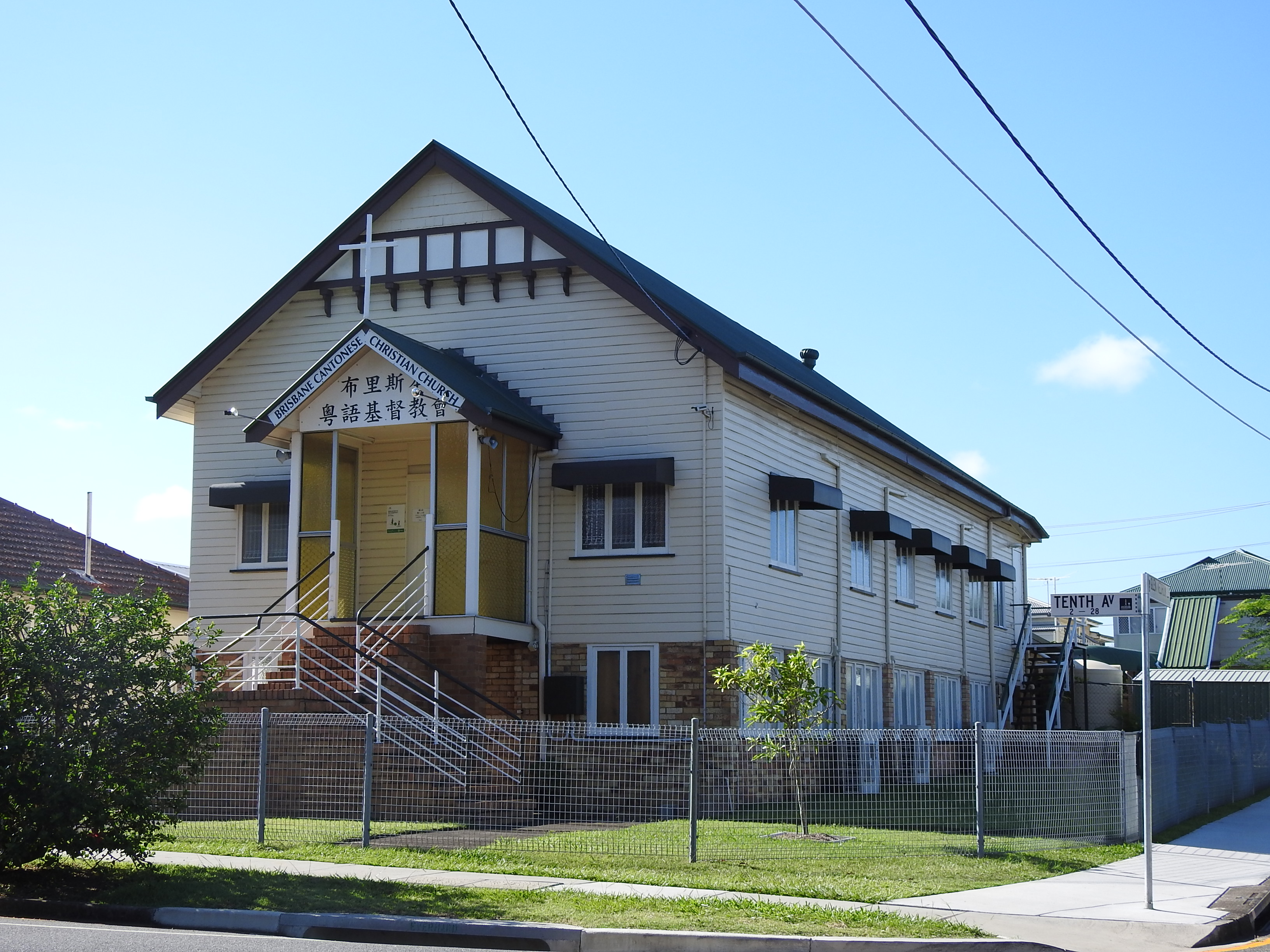
Brisbane Cantonese Christian Church, Tenth Avenue, and Glen Kedron Lane (2021).

A notable landmark is the War Memorial in Lutwyche Cemetery on Gympie Road. It contains more than 100 gravestones of servicemen, the majority of whom gave their life in World War II.

Kedron State High School opened on 23 January 1956.

Padua College, Brisbane opened on 31 January 1956; it was operated by the Franciscan Friars.

Mount Alvernia College opened on 1 February 1956; it was run by the Missionary Franciscan Sisters of the Immaculate Conception.

St James' Anglican Church at 28 Tenth Avenue (corner of Glen Kedron Lane, 27.4060°S 153.0365°E) was dedicated on 6 November 1960 by Coadjutor Bishop Horace Henry Dixon. Its closure on 14 March 1987 was approved by Assistant Bishop George Browning. On 20 March 1988, the Brisbane Cantonese Gospel Church took over the church building. It later was renamed Brisbane Cantonese Christian Church.

== Demographics ==
In the 2011 census, Kedron had a population of 8,594 people, 51.4% female and 48.6% male. The median age of the Kedron population was 34 years of age, 3 years below the Australian median. 76.1% of people living in Kedron were born in Australia, compared to the national average of 69.8%; the next most common countries of birth were New Zealand 3.2%, England 2.8%, India 1.4%, Italy 1.1%, Philippines 0.9%. 84.7% of people spoke only English at home; the next most common languages were 2% Italian, 0.6% Mandarin, 0.5% Tagalog, 0.5% Cantonese, 0.5% Spanish.

In the 2016 census, Kedron had a population of 9,359 people.

In the 2021 census, Kedron had a population of 9,907 people.

== Heritage listings ==
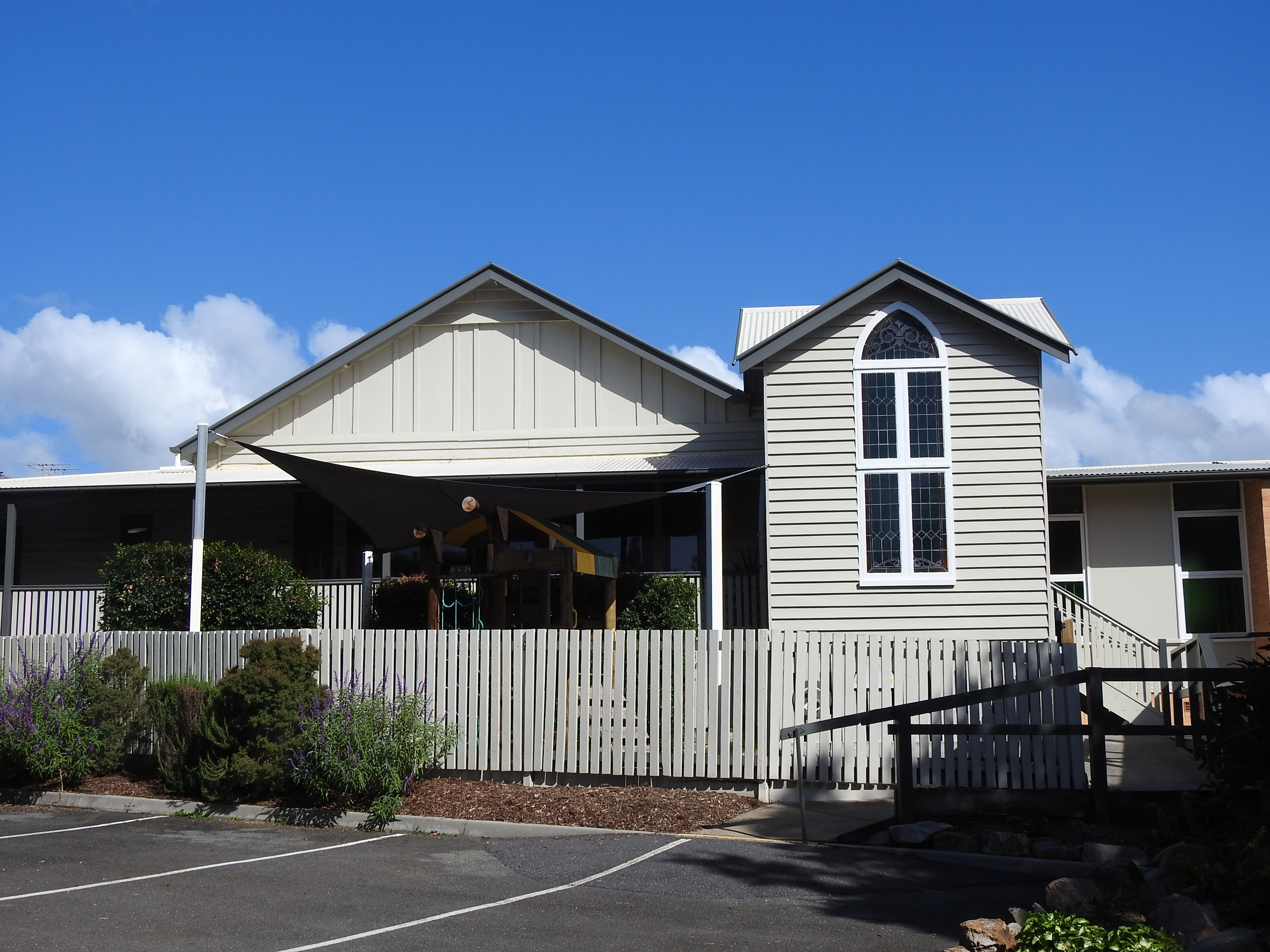
1929 Church of Christ building

- 12 Childers Street: Pill Residence
- 21 Dawn Street: Craigie Knowe
- 217 Gympie Road: Church of Christ & Ministry Centre (also known as Hauff farmhouse)
- 418 Gympie Road: Lutwyche Cemetery & Sexton's Residence (also known as Kedron Brook Cemetery)
- 418 Gympie Road: former Tram Shelter
- 9 Ninth Avenue: former Kedron Uniting Church (also known as Kedron Methodist Church)
- 16 Ninth Avenue: Kedron State School B & C Blocks
- 5 Sixth Avenue: Derrington
- 41 Turner Road: former Kedron Shire Quarry Face & Stone Crusher
- 66 Turner Road: St Theresa and St Anthony's Parish Hall (also known as St Anthony's Convalescent Home)
- 77 Turner Road: St Anthony's Catholic School
- 100 Turner Road: Franciscan Friary (former) & fence (also known as Padua College)
- 115 Turner Road: former Delamore (also known as Franciscan Sisters of the Immaculate Conception novitiate house, Mount Alvernia secondary girls' school)

== Education ==
Kedron State School is a government primary (Prep–6) school for boys and girls at Leckie Road (27.4064°S 153.0348°E). In 2018, the school had an enrolment of 432 students with 31 teachers (24 full-time equivalent) and 14 non-teaching staff (10 full-time equivalent). It includes a special education program.

St Anthony's School is a Catholic primary (Prep–6) school for boys and girls at 121 Somerset Road (27.4072°S 153.0254°E). In 2018, the school had an enrolment of 666 students with 42 teachers (36 full-time equivalent) and 24 non-teaching staff (13 full-time equivalent).

Padua College is a Catholic primary and secondary (5–12) school for boys at 80 Turner Road (27.4074°S 153.0251°E). In 2018, the school had an enrolment of 1,291 students with 96 teachers (94 full-time equivalent) and 40 non-teaching staff (35 full-time equivalent).

Kedron State High School is a government secondary (7–12) school for boys and girls at Park Road (27.4153°S 153.0397°E). In 2018, the school had an enrolment of 1,525 students with 132 teachers (124 full-time equivalent) and 73 non-teaching staff (51 full-time equivalent). It includes a special education program.

Mount Alvernia College is a Catholic secondary (7–12) school for girls at 82 Cremorne Road (27.4055°S 153.0274°E). In 2018, the school had an enrolment of 886 students with 75 teachers (70 full-time equivalent) and 49 non-teaching staff (39 full-time equivalent).

== Amenities ==
Brisbane North Church of Christ is at 217 Gympie Road (accessed from 12 Emerald Street, 27.4095°S 153.0329°E).

The Brisbane Cantonese Christian Church is at 20 Tenth Avenue (27.4060°S 153.0364°E). The church conducts non-denominational Christian services in English and Cantonese.

== Gallery ==
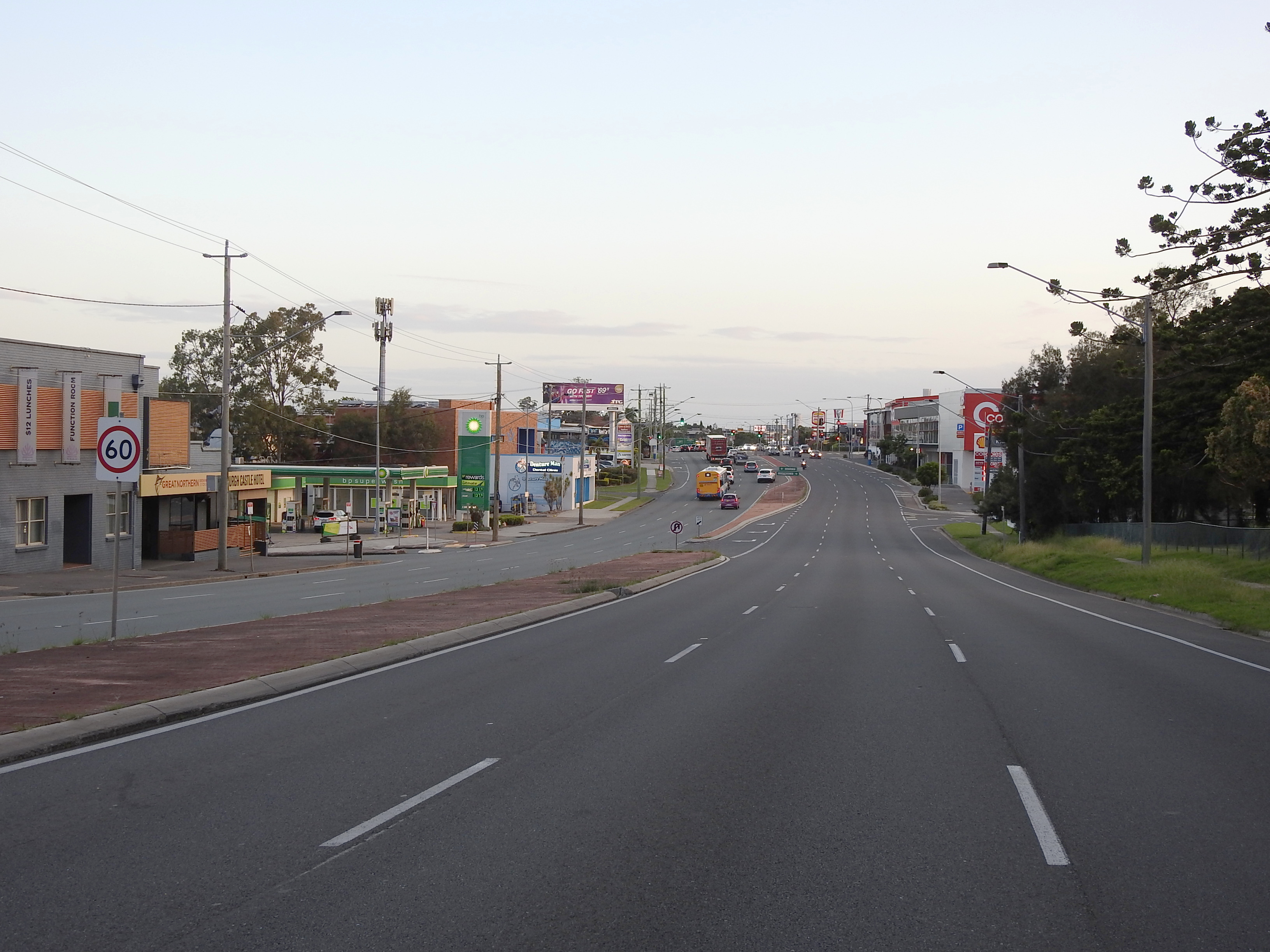
Gympie Road, looking south (2021).

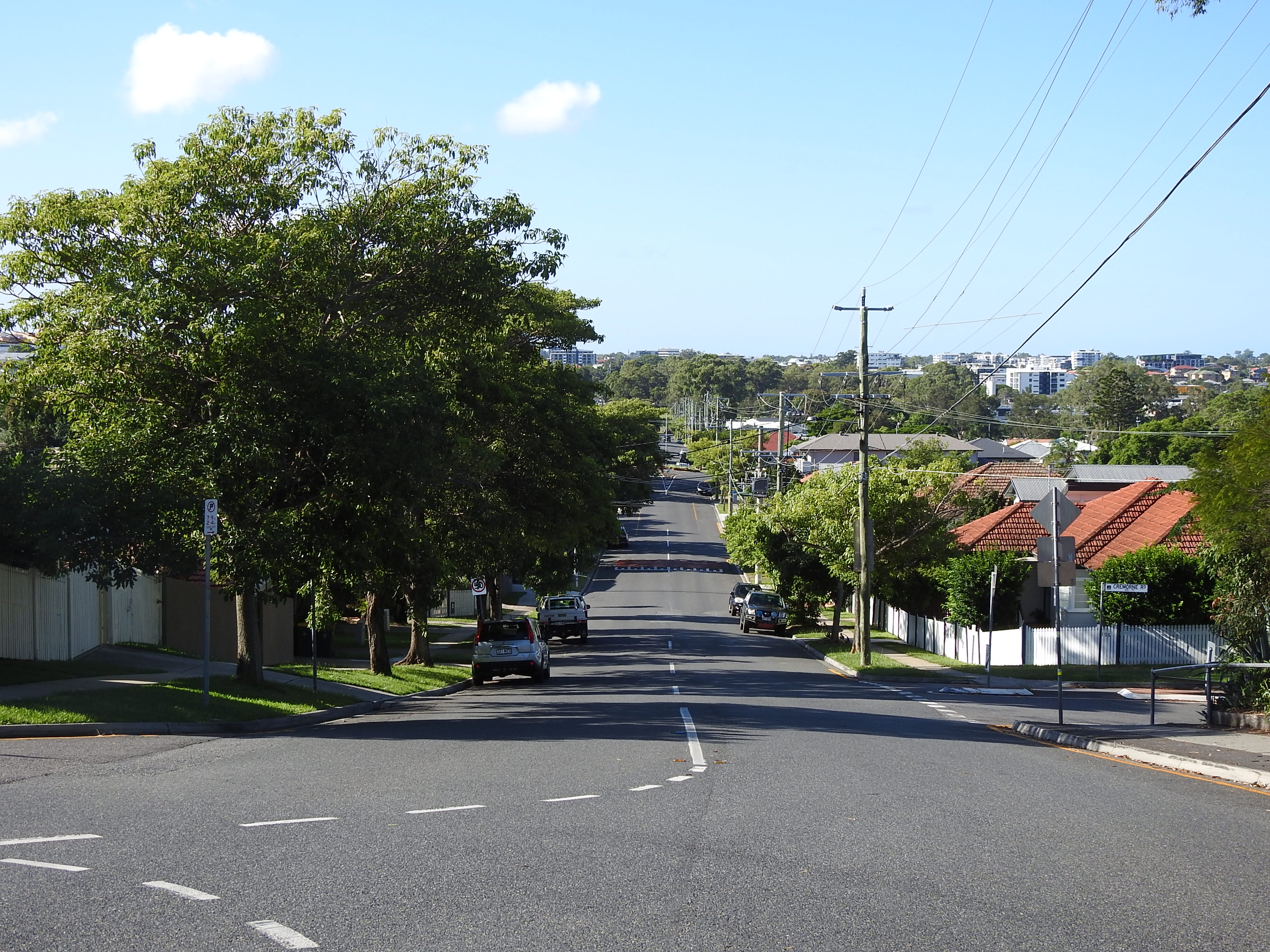
Turner Road, looking north (2021).

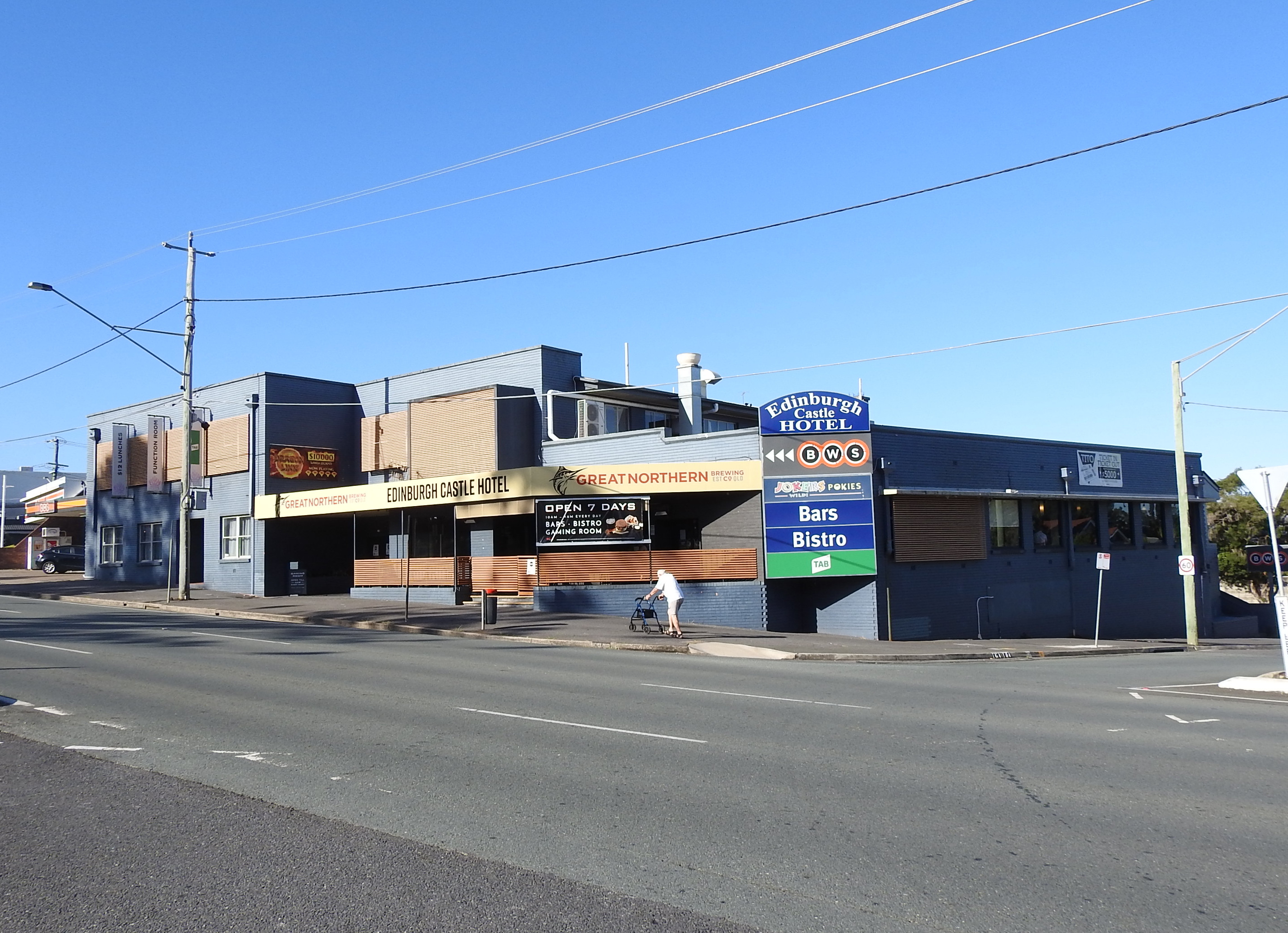
Edinburgh Castle Hotel, Gympie Road (2021).

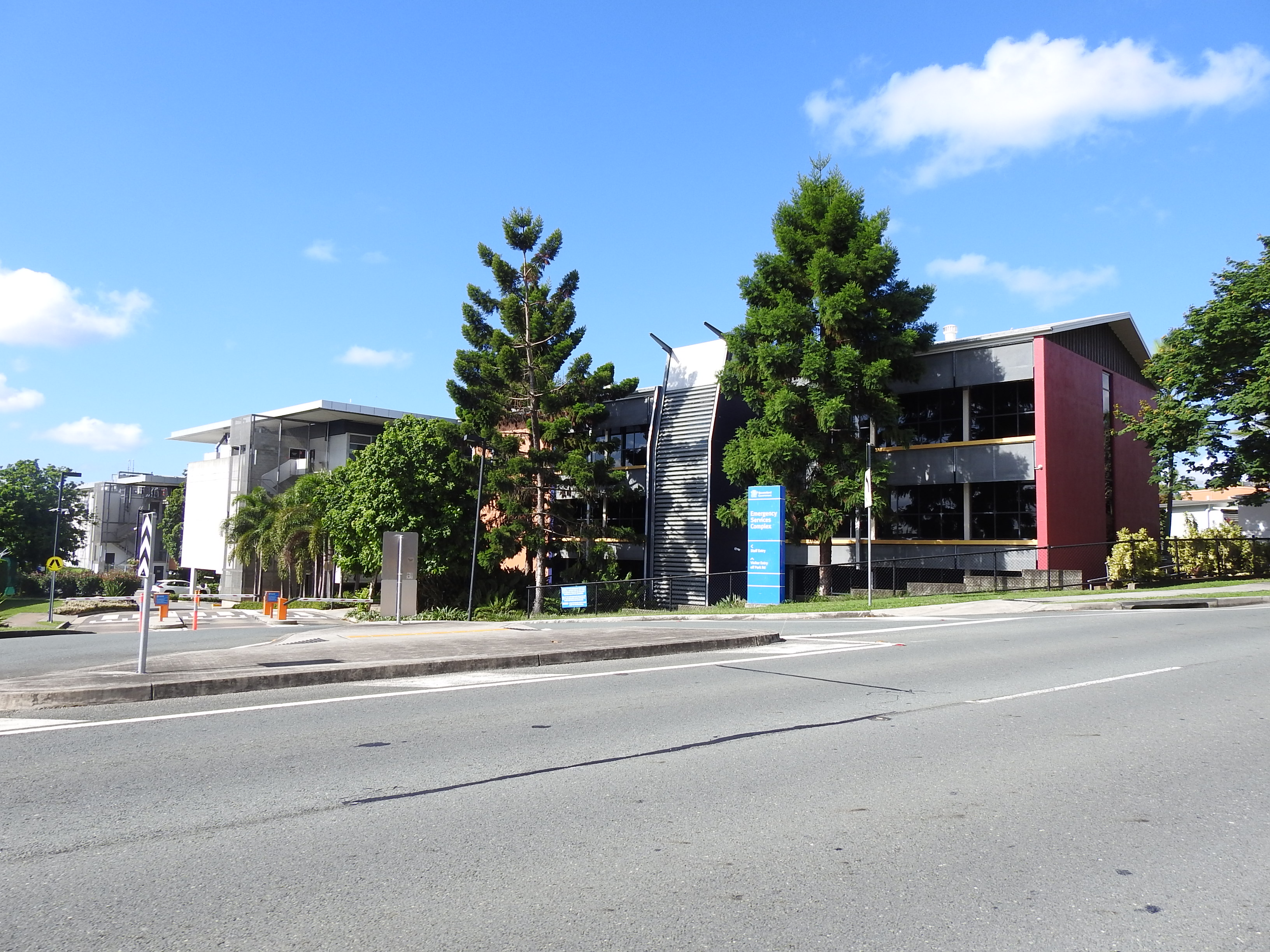
Emergency Services Centre, Queensland Government, Kedron Park Road (2021).

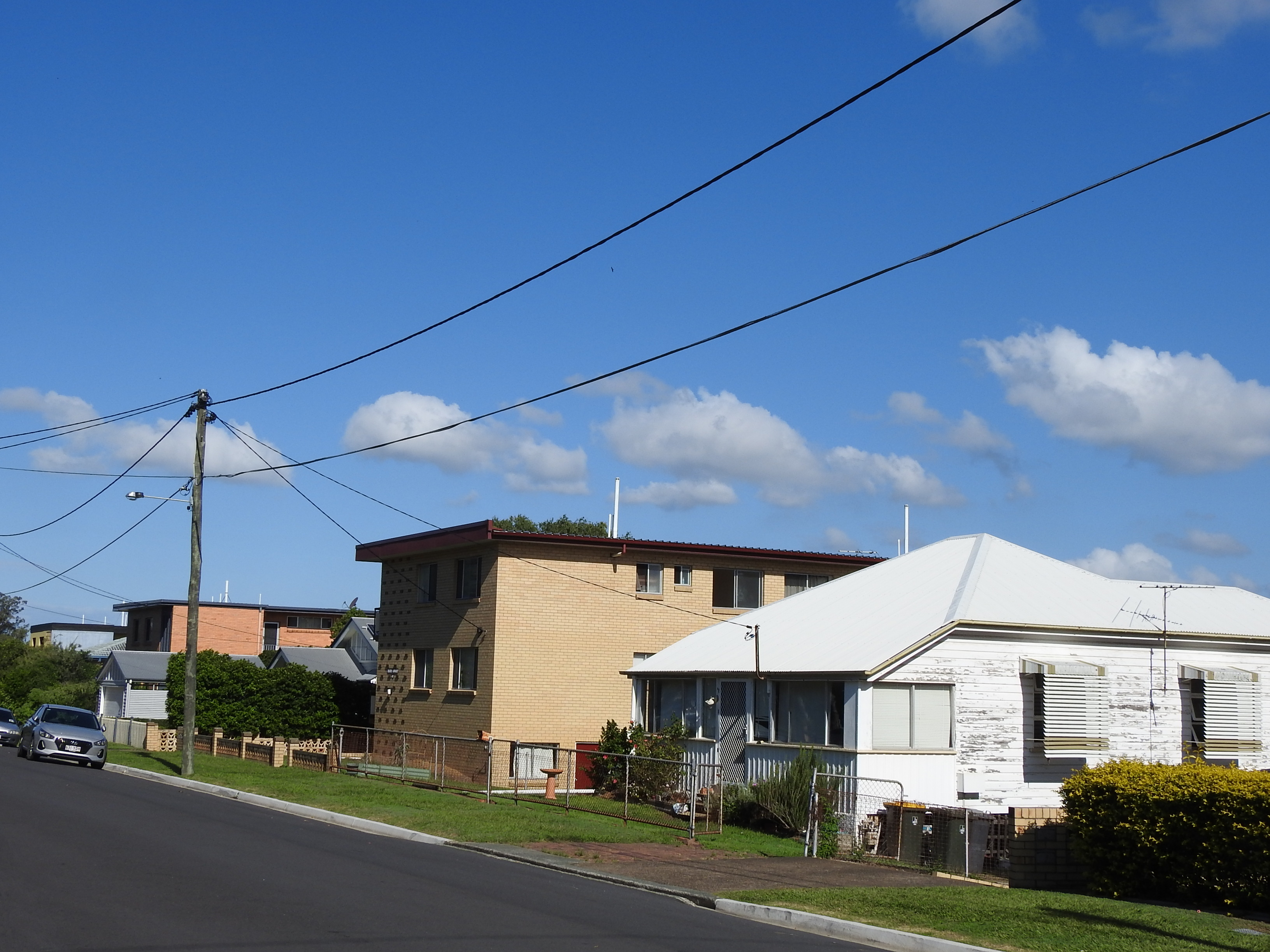
Housing style common to the area (2021).

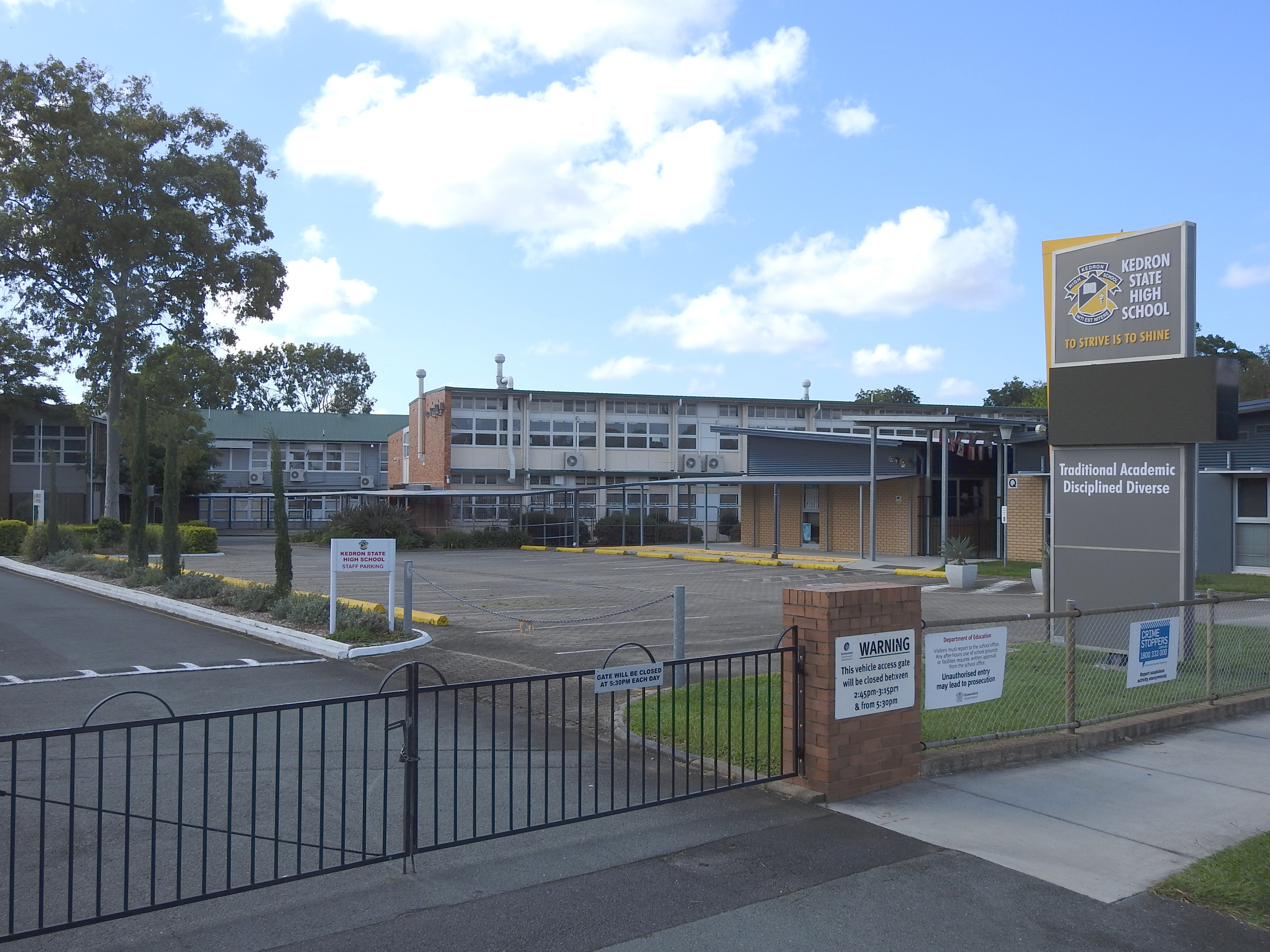
Kedron State High School, Park Road (2021).

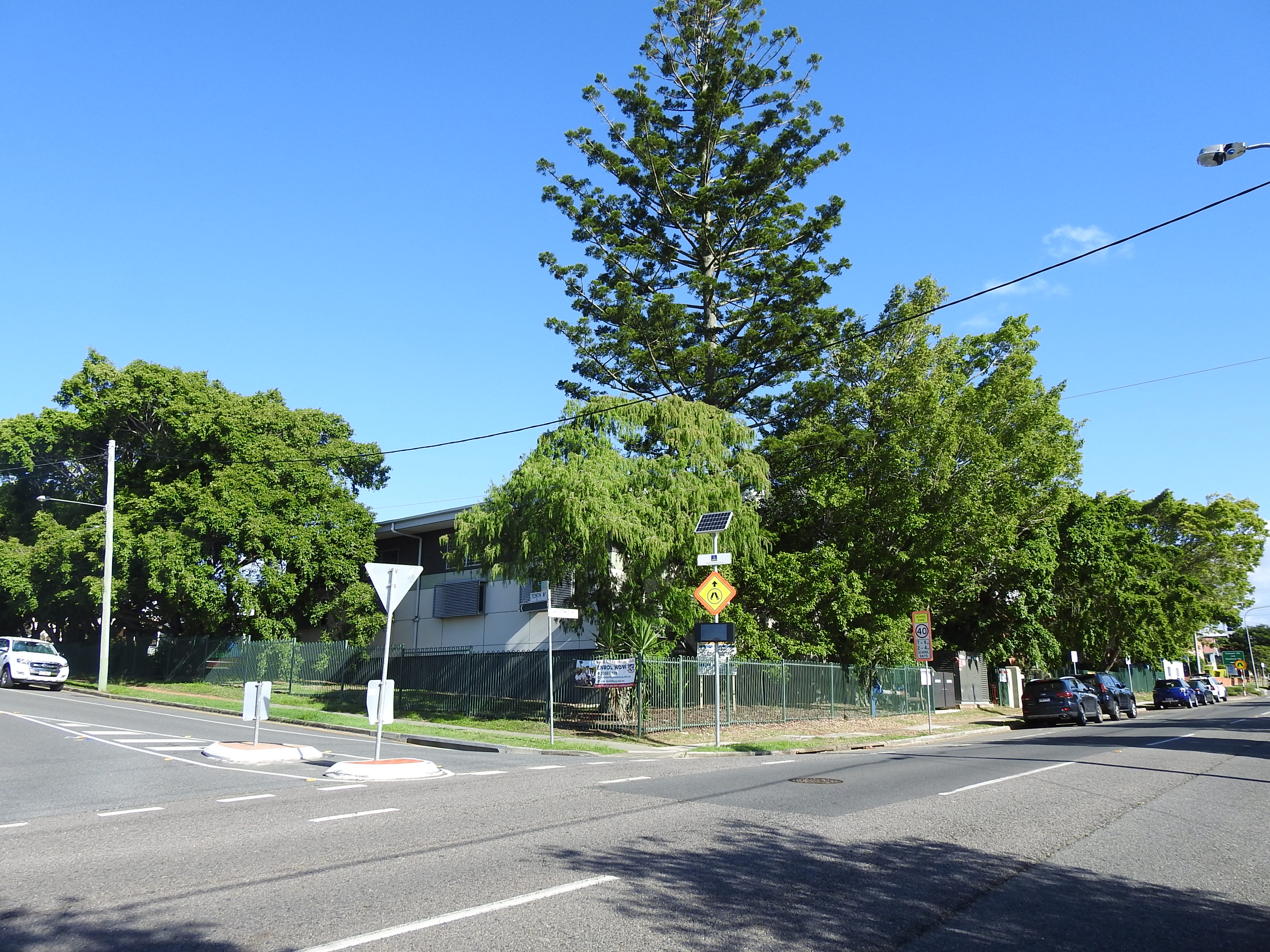
Kedron State School, Leckie Road, with Tenth Avenue (2021).

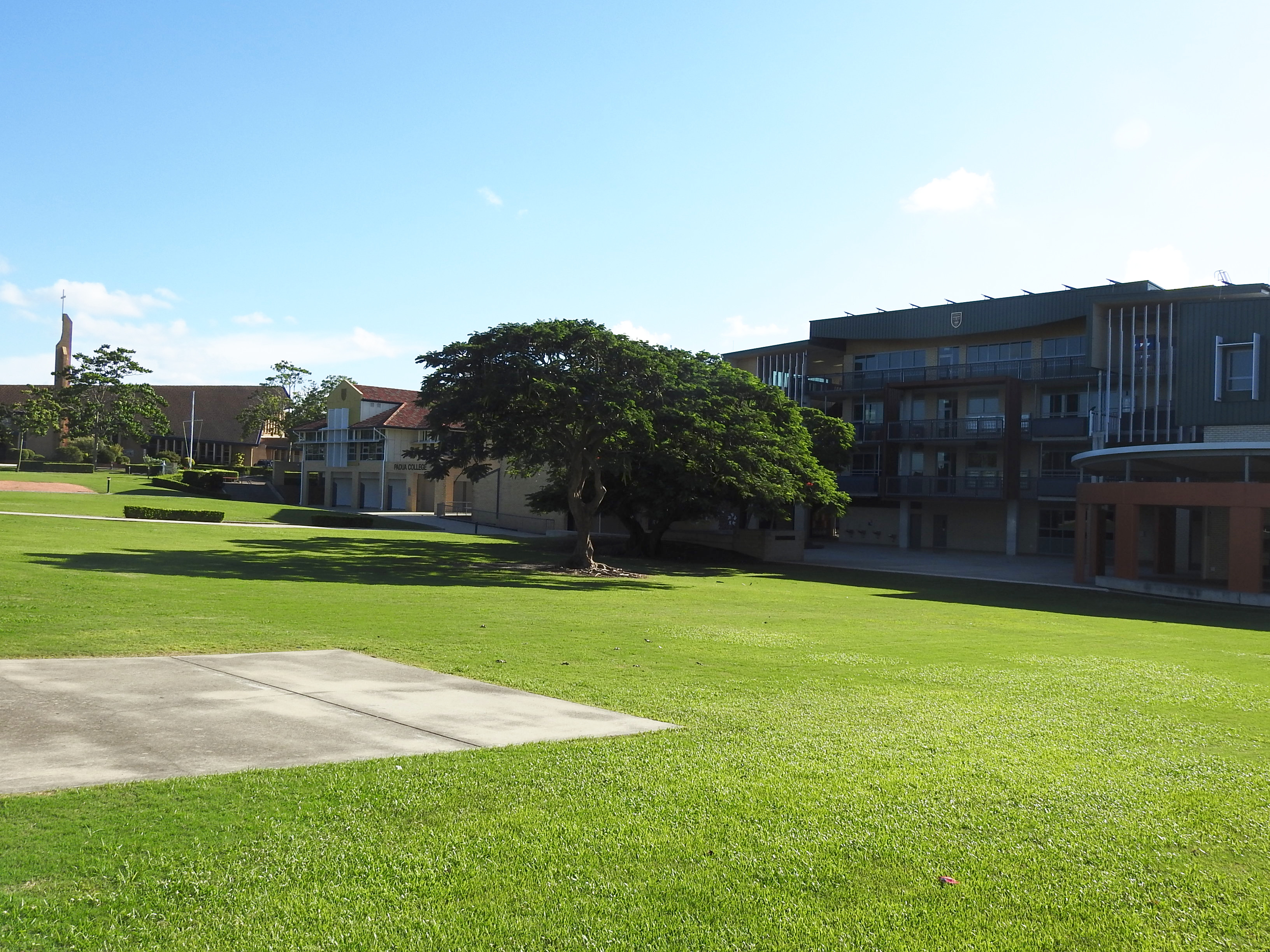
Padua College halls facing Turner Road (2021).

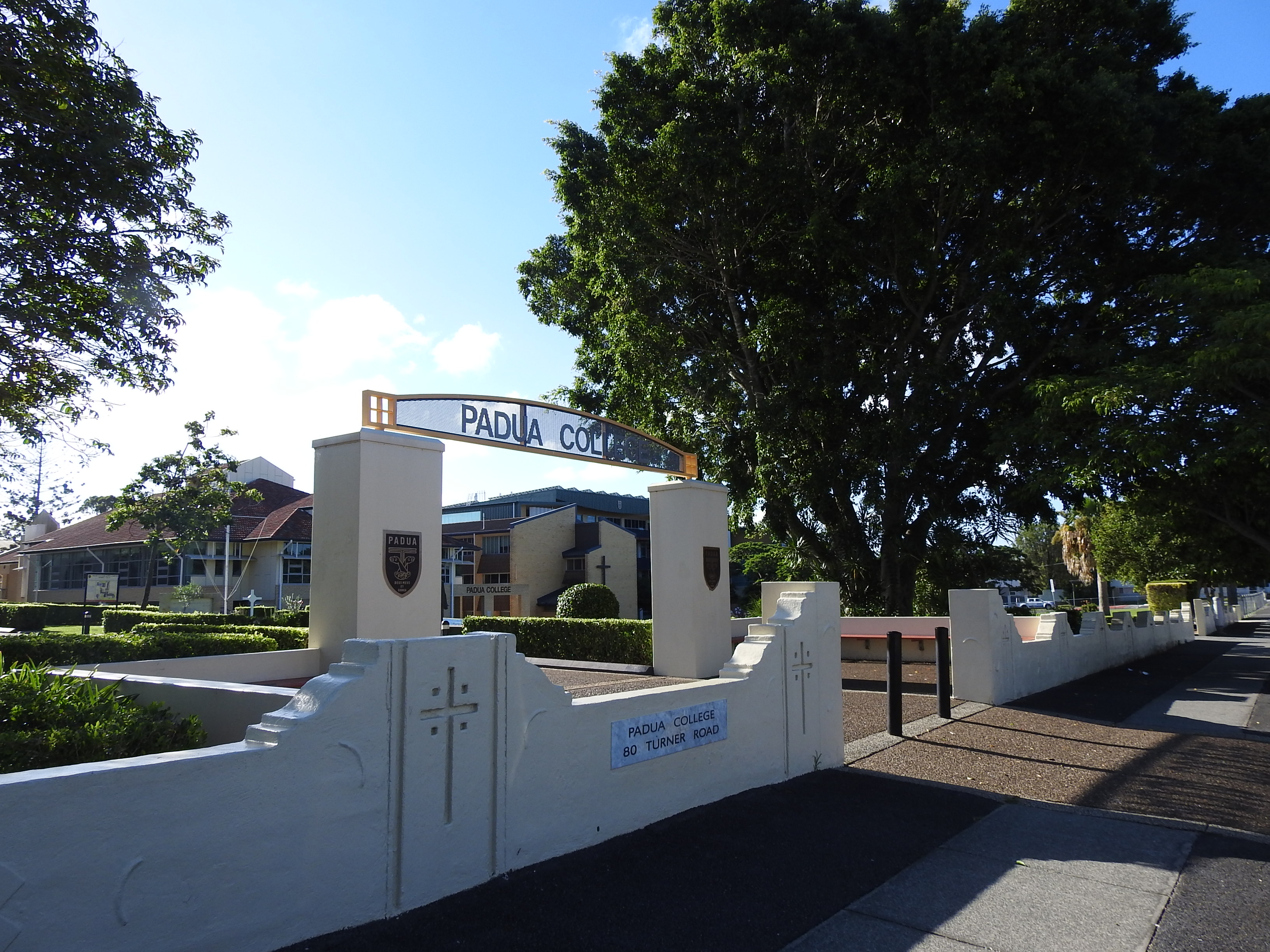
Padua College entrance gate, 80 Turner Road (2021).

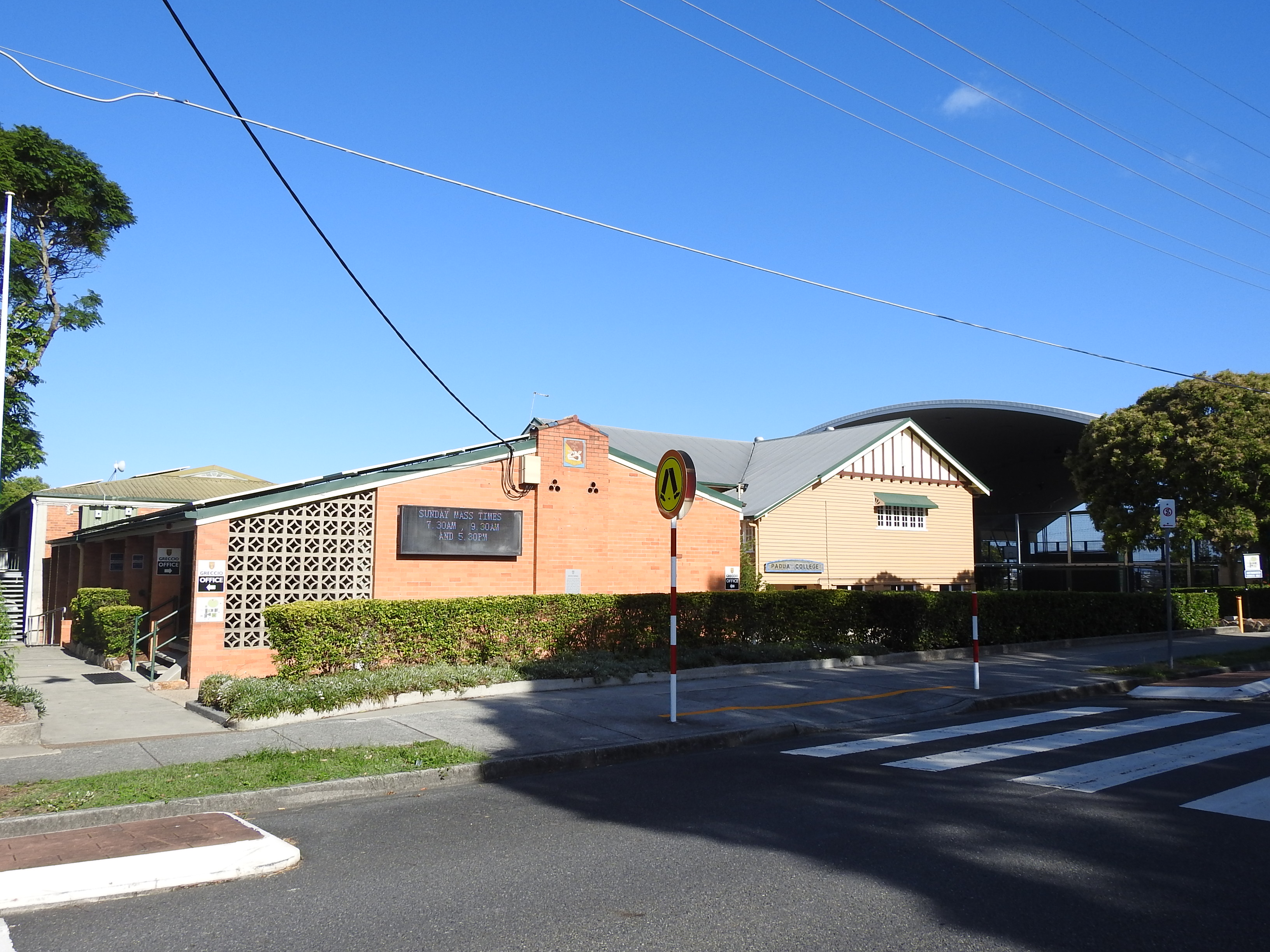
Greccio offices, Padua College, Turner Road (2021).

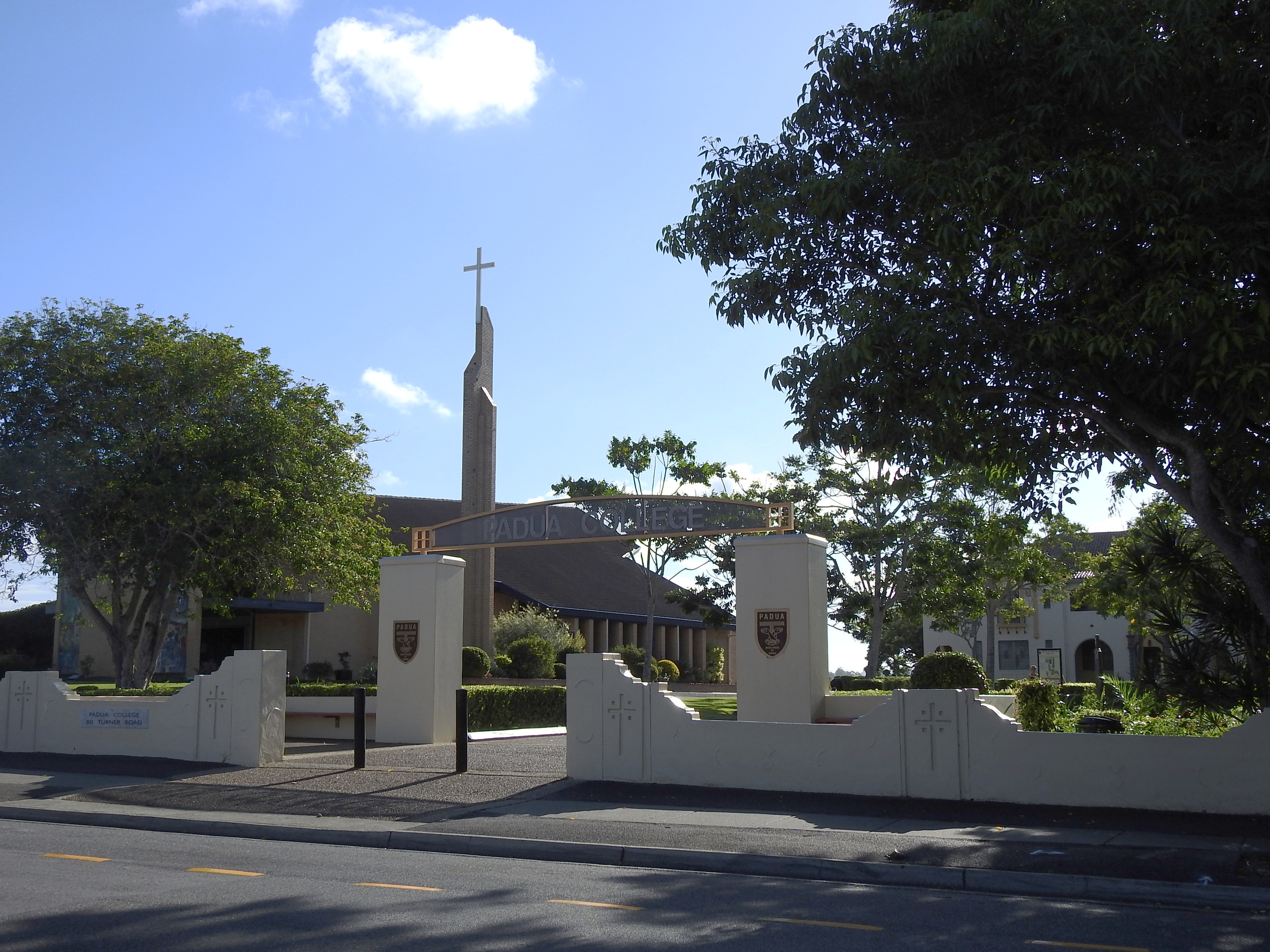
Padua College entrance gate, with Saint Therese Catholic Church, Turner Road (2021).

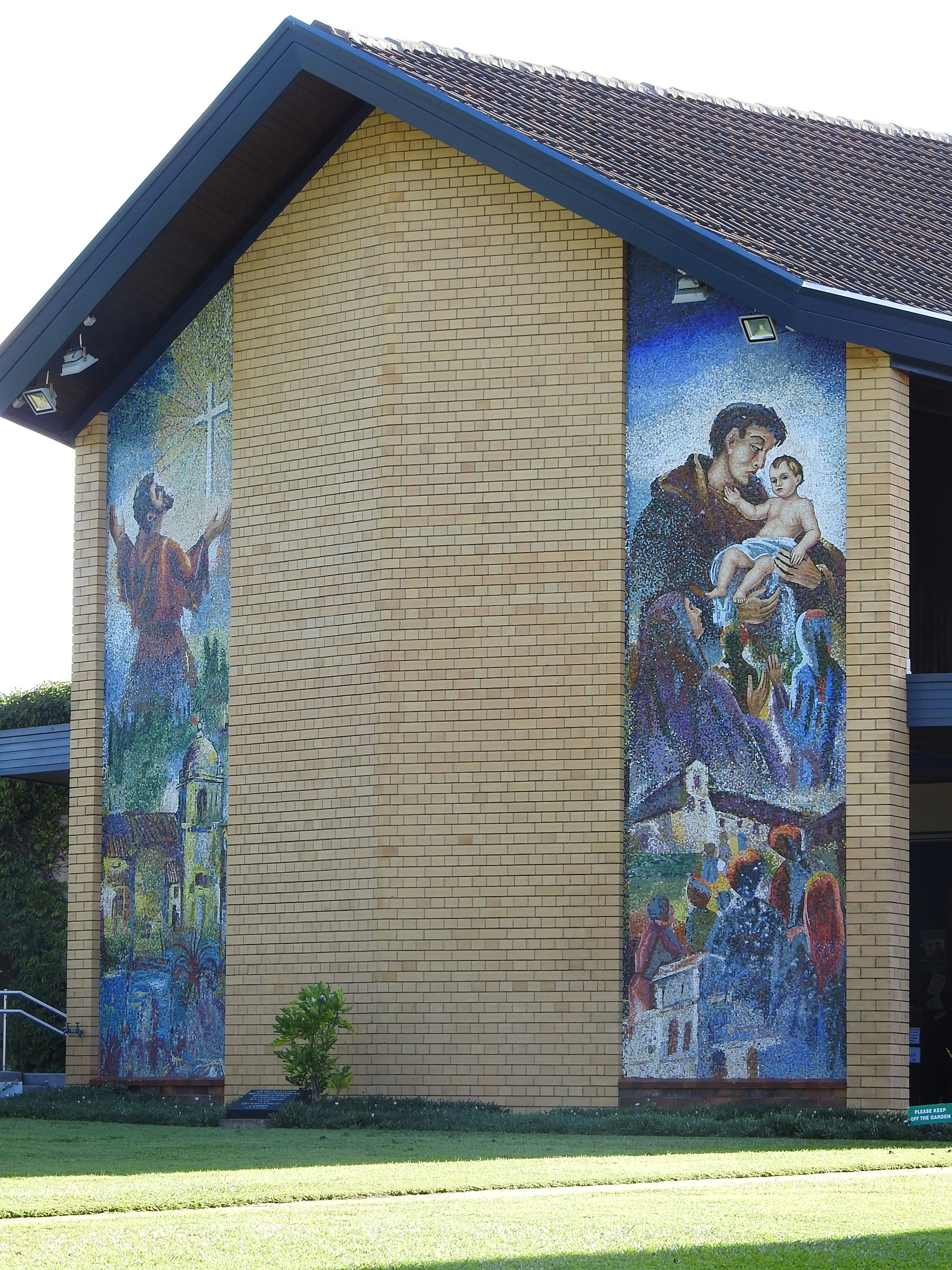
Saint Theresa Catholic Church, Turner Road (2021).

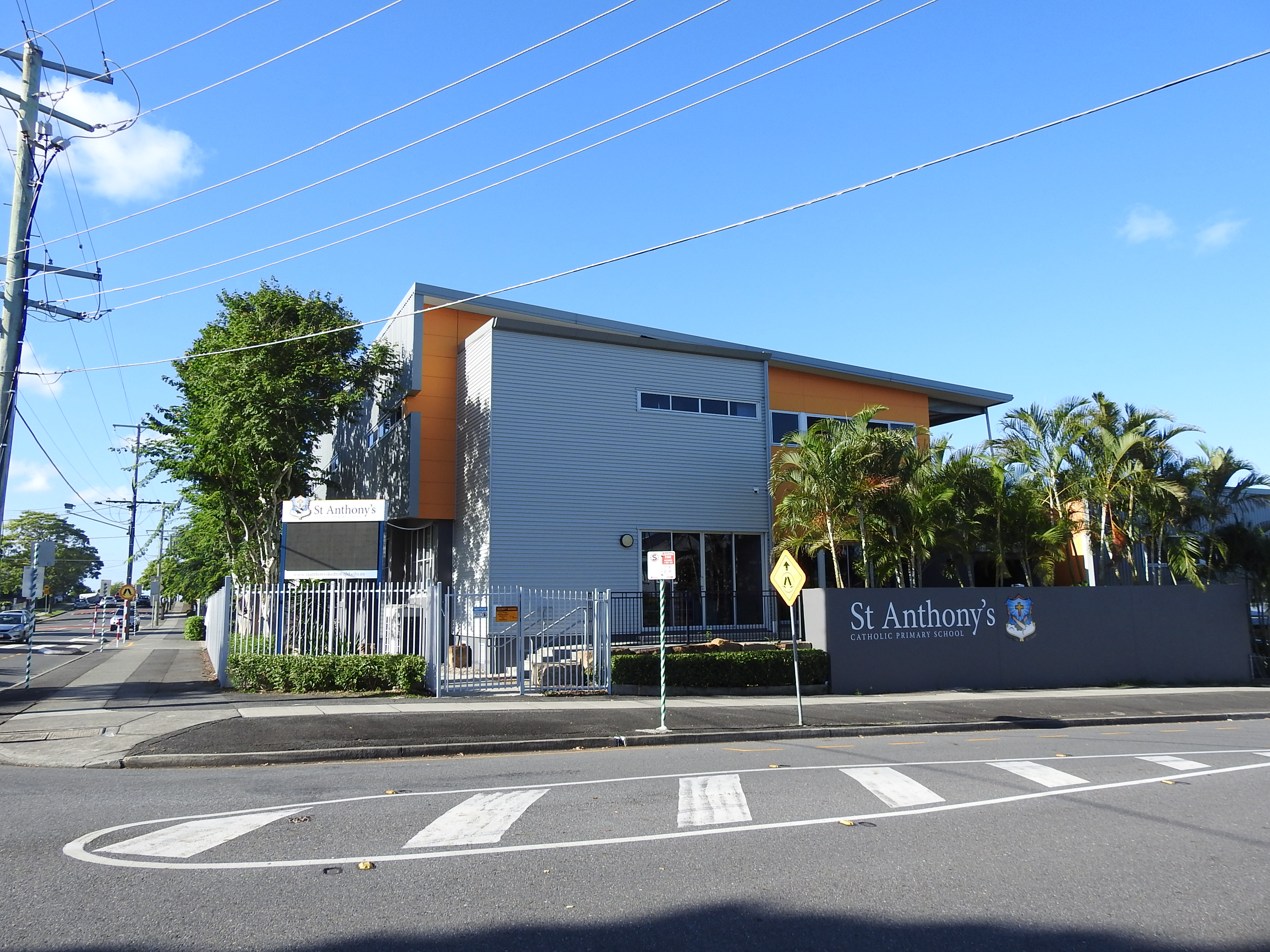
Saint Anthony's Catholic Primary School, on Somerset Street, intersecting Turner Road (2021).

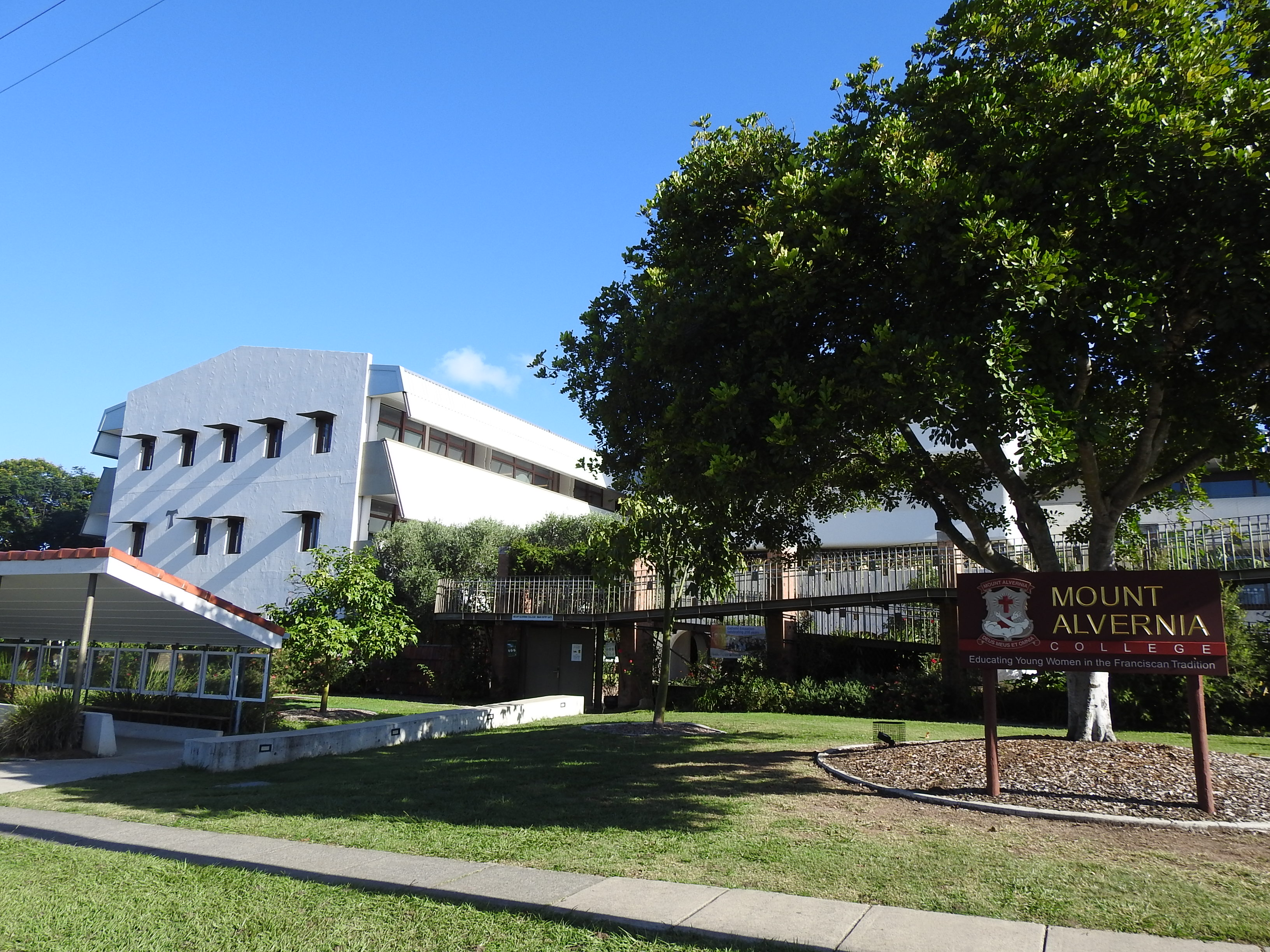
Mount Alvernia College (educating young women in the Franciscan tradition), Catholic secondary school on Cremorne Road (2021).

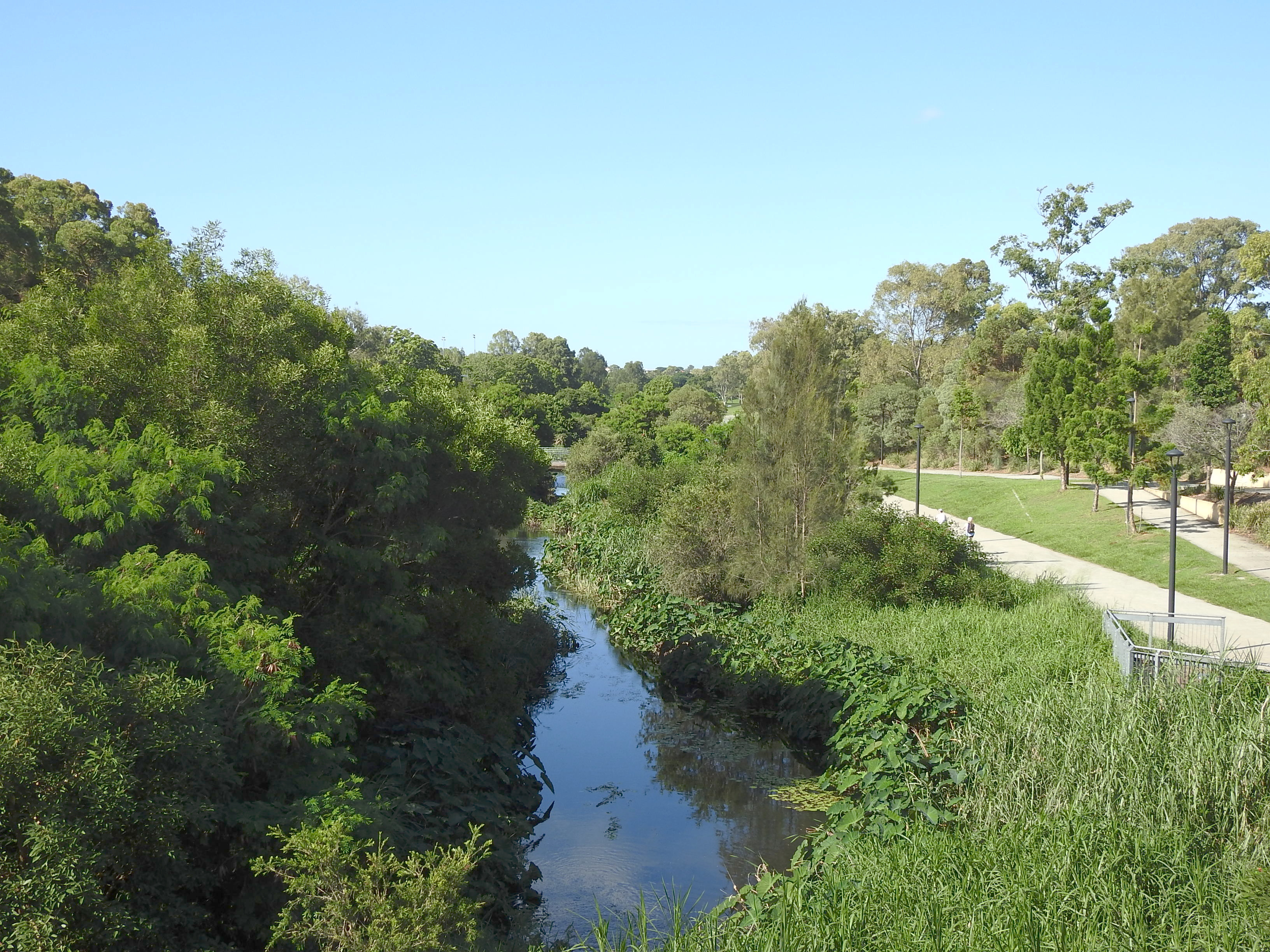
Kedron Brook stream, looking downstream from Gympie Road (2021).

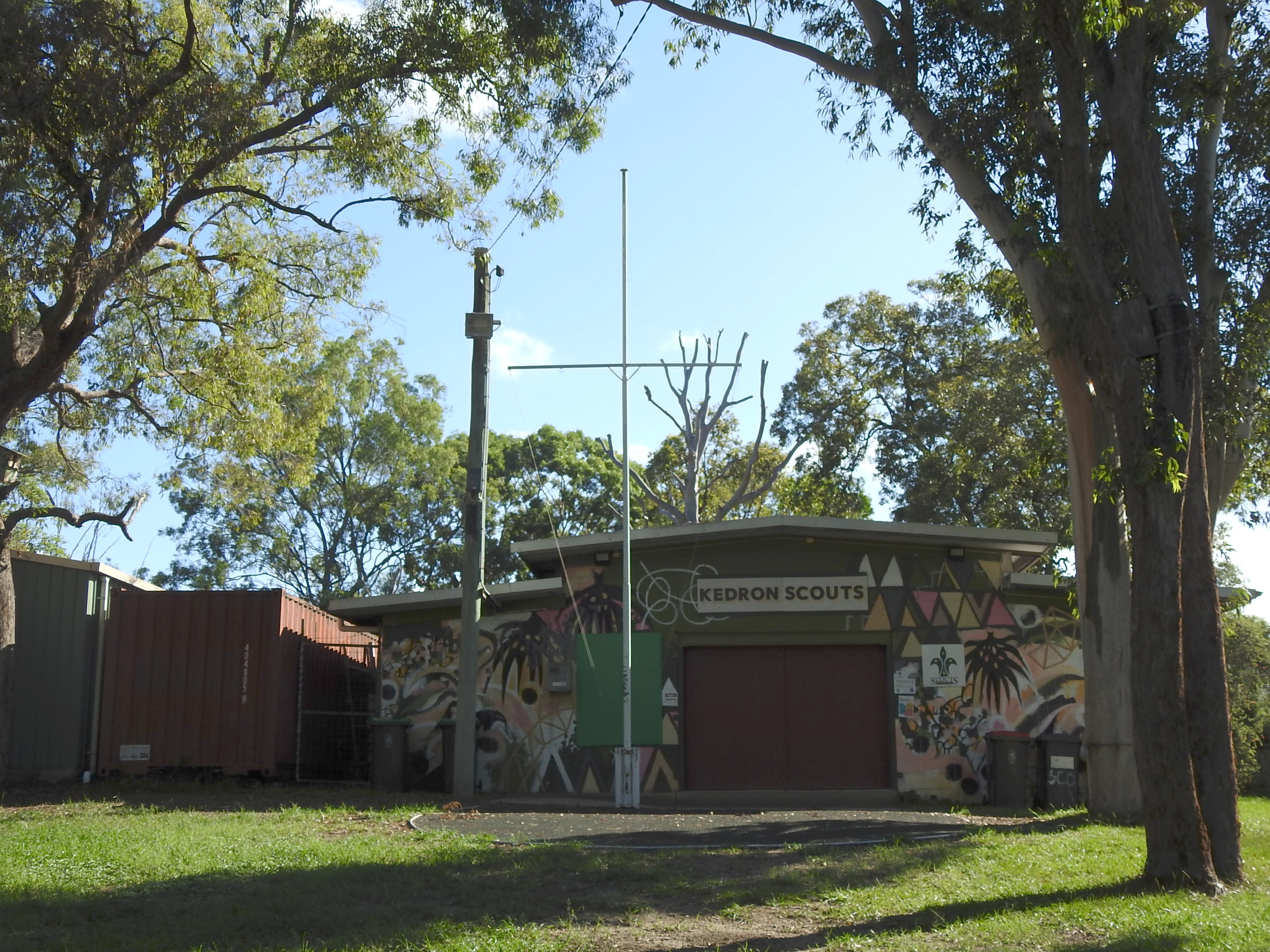
Kedron Scout Den, Tenth Avenue (2021).

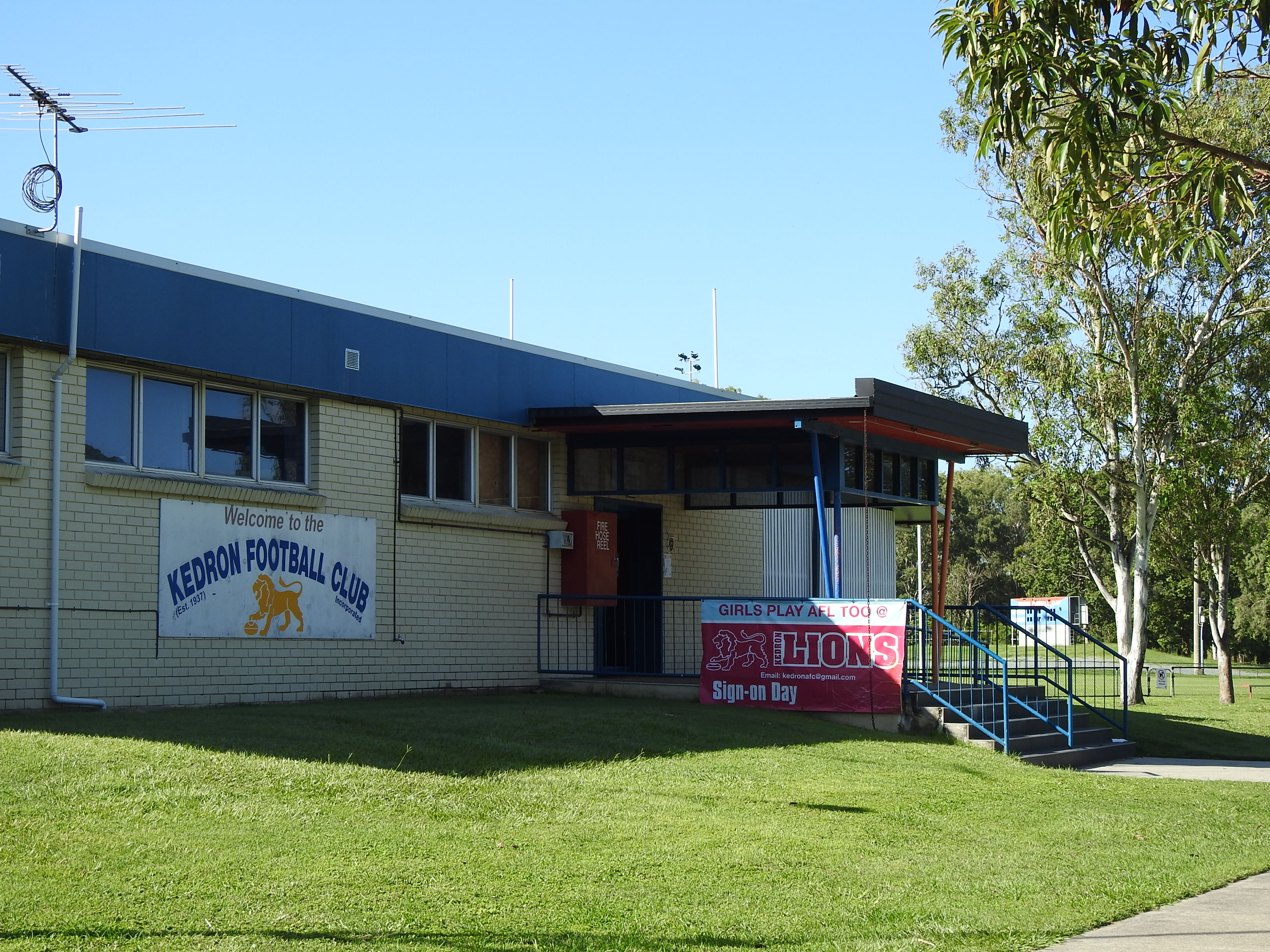
Kedron Football Club, Sixth Avenue (2021).

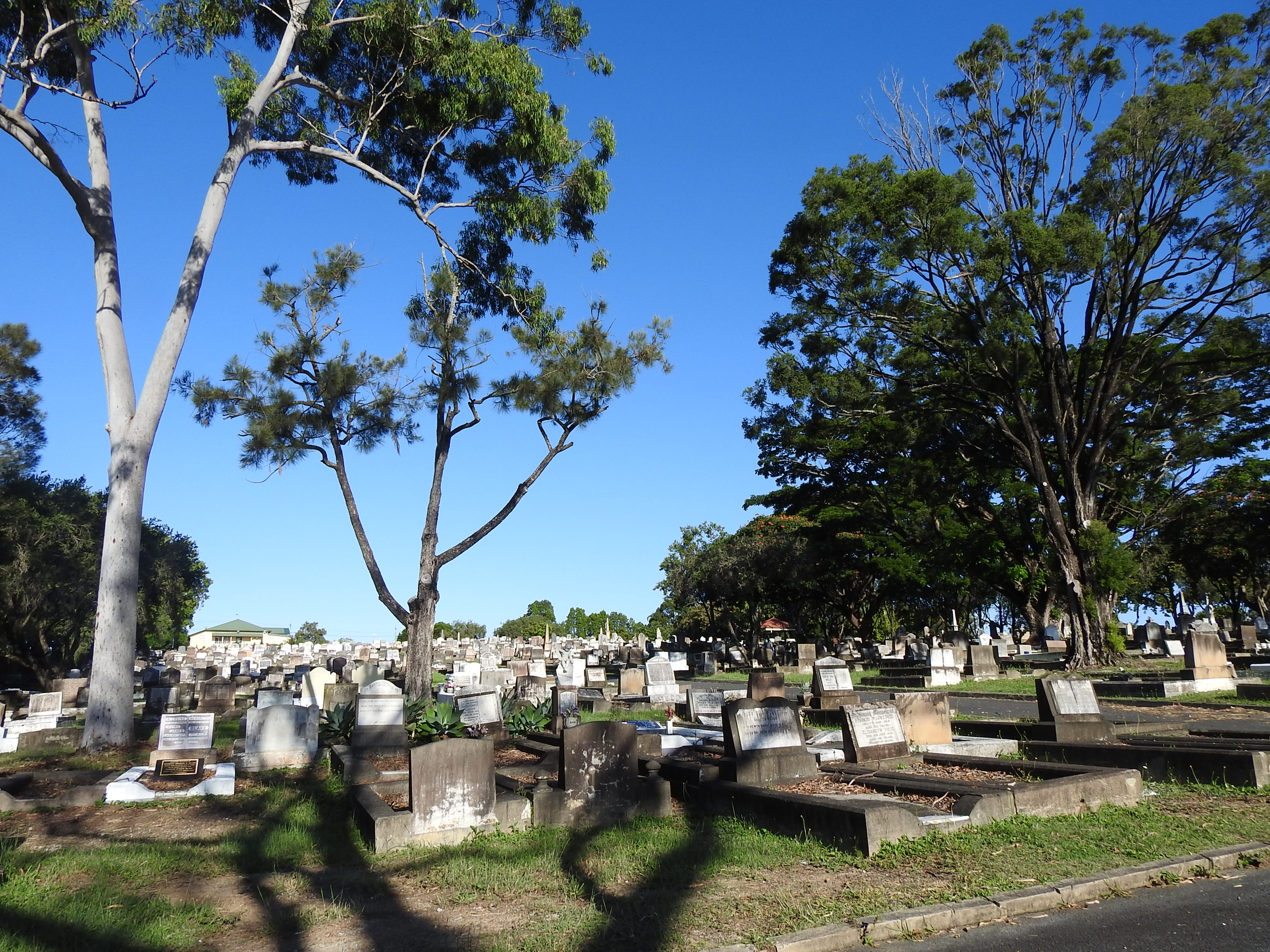
Lutwyche Cemetery, Kedron (2021).
