= San Sisto College =

Catholic day school for girls in Brisbane, Australia

Coordinates: 27.4910°S 153.0908°E

San Sisto School
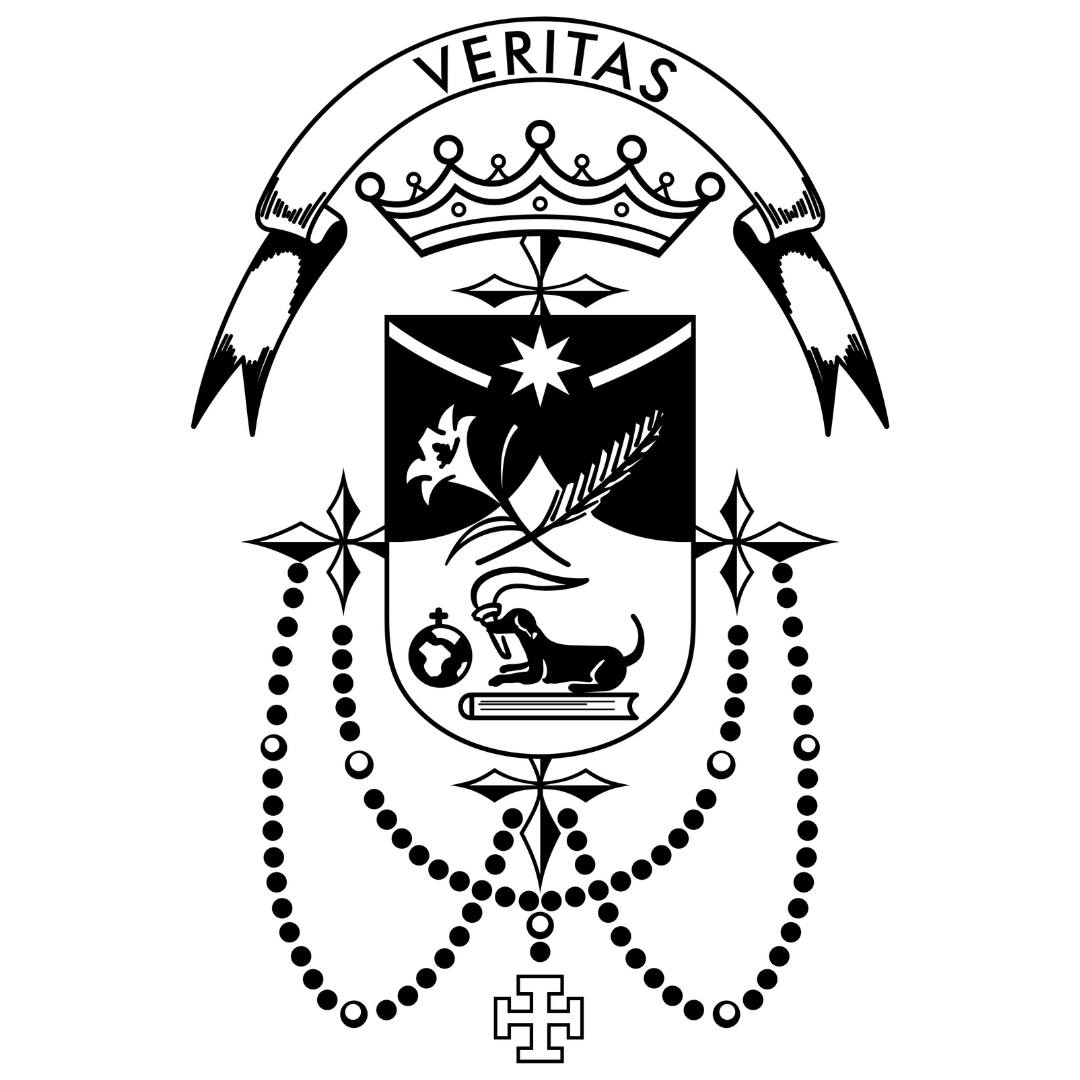

Location
- 97 Mayfield Rd, Carina; Brisbane, Queensland, 4152; Australia

Information
- Type: Private, single-sex, day school
- Motto: Latin: Veritas (The Truth)
- Denomination: Roman Catholic, Sisters of Mercy
- Established: Nov 1961; 64 years ago
- Principal: Warren Bath
- Affiliation: Catholic Secondary Schoolgirls' Sports Association
- Website: www.sansisto.qld.edu.au

San Sisto College is a Roman Catholic secondary college for girls in grades 7 to 12, located in Carina, a suburb of south-east Brisbane, Queensland, Australia. It has approximately 900 students. The college is divided into three schools: Caleruega (Years 7 and 8), Fanjeaux (Years 9 and 10) and Bologna (Years 11 and 12).

The different categories of the schools are named after the travel of St Dominic, who was born in Caleruega, Spain, travelled to Fanjeaux, France, and died in Bologna, Italy.

Within San Sisto College, there are six blocks of classrooms, M block, F block, C block, A block, R block and DE and DW block.

== History ==
San Sisto College was founded in 1961 by Sister Jude, who was the first principal. The first teachers at San Sisto College were Dominican Sisters who had travelled from Maitland, New South Wales.

== School houses ==
There are four school sport houses: Jude, Rose, Catherine and Dominic.

Jude, named after Sr. Mary St. Jude, the first principal of the college, is the green house and the mascot is a crocodile.

Rose, named after St. Rose of Lima, is the red house and the mascot is a dragon.

Catherine, named after St. Catherine of Siena, is the blue house and the mascot is a shark.

Dominic, named after St. Dominic, is the yellow house and the mascot is a honeybee.

== School song ==
Though young our school, we've traditions rich and old passed on through eight hundred years.

San Sisto's our name one we very proudly claim, with Veritas our motto like Dominicans all.

To our school, we promise our loyalty, true Christians may we always be.

By showing in our lives, the principles here fostered, as witness to the truth in word and deed.

Like Dominic of old and the band that gathered 'round him, champions of truth in the world

San Sisto we love you and hope to make you proud, both now and even more in the years yet to come.

The school is affiliated with the Dominican Sisters of Eastern Australia and the Solomon Islands.
