= St Columba's College, Essendon =

St Columba's College

Address
- 2 Leslie Rd, Essendon; Essendon, Victoria 3040; Australia
- Coordinates: 37.7574°S 144.9143°E

Information
- Type: Catholic all-female secondary
- Motto: Latin: Fidelis et Fortis (Faithful and Strong)
- Established: 1897; 128 years ago
- Founder: Mother Ursula Bruton
- Headmistress: Rita Grima
- Grades: 7–12
- Enrolment: ~1000
- Colour(s): Navy blue and gold
- Affiliations: Roman Catholic, Sisters of Charity
- Website: www.columba.vic.edu.au

St Columba's College is an all-female Roman Catholic secondary school in Essendon, a suburb of Melbourne, Australia. It is one of four Sisters of Charity of Australia educational establishments, with St Vincent's College, Potts Point, Mt St Michael's College, Brisbane, and Catholic Ladies College, Eltham.

== History ==
After taking responsibility for St Monica's Parish Primary School in Moonee Ponds in 1896, Mother Ursula Bruton (died 1899) purchased the property at 139 Buckley Street to provide secondary education for the girls from St Monica's. A primary division was also offered from the college's earliest days. Mother Ursula believed that secondary education was needed so that young women could take their rightful place in society. She was the first principal and named the school St Columba's.

Columba was an Irish saint and a great scholar, who lived in the sixth century. The college motto chosen was "Fidelis et Fortis" meaning "faithful and strong", and the shield with its crown and dove reflected the Sisters of Charity's crest and Columba's name ("colm cille" meaning "church dove" in Irish). The first classes were held on 13 July 1897 for 47 students.

The initial educational program provided a broad and liberal education for young women and in 1900 presented its first candidates for matriculation.

== Current houses ==
The seven Houses and their associated colours are:

- Cater (Purple): After Sister Mary Lawrence Cater, who was the youngest of the five Pioneer Sisters and became the Head of a school for orphans at Parramatta.
- Cahill (Yellow): After Sister Mary John Cahill, who was the eldest of the Pioneer Sisters and whose special ministry was with prisoners in Sydney, Parramatta and Hobart, as well as giving religious instruction in churches in Sydney and Hobart.
- Cunningham (Green): After Sister Mary Xavier Cunningham, who was the first Australian to enter the Sisters of Charity. She was also the Matron of St. Vincent's Hospital for twenty two years.
- Williams (Blue): After Sister Mary Xavier Williams, who was a Novice at the time of arrival in Australia and her Profession of Vows was the first Profession in the colony. She was one of three Sisters who went to Hobart in 1847 where she visited gaols, hospitals and the homes of the poor.
- O'Brien (Orange): After Sister Mary Francis de Sale O'Brien, who was sent by Mary Aikenhead to Paris to be trained in nursing and hospital management. She also left Sydney and ministered in Hobart.
- Bruton (Red): After Sister Mary Ursula Bruton, who was the first Principal of St. Vincent's College, Potts Point and opened St. Columba's College, Essendon in 1897.
- De Lacy (Pink): After Sister Mary Baptist de Lacy, who was the only one of the Pioneer Sisters who entered the Sisters of Charity, specifically for the Australian Mission. She was trained in Nursing and was the Foundress of St. Vincent's Hospital, Sydney, which was the first hospital opened by the Sisters in Australia.

== Previous houses ==
The eight Houses and their associated colours were previously:

- Caritas (Purple) – in recognition of the Sisters of Charity.
- Chisholm (Yellow) – After Caroline Chisholm, who supported immigrants.
- Columba (Navy blue) – After St Columba, the patron of the college.
- Cuthbert (Green) – After Betty Cuthbert, Australian sportswomen.
- Franklin (Light blue) – After Miles Franklin, writer.
- Gilmore (Grey) – After Dame Mary Gilmore, writer.
- Lyons (Red) – After Dame Enid Lyons, a politician.
- Melba (White) – After Dame Nellie Melba, soprano singer.

== Notable alumnae ==
- Silvie Paladino – Singer
- Tina Arena – Singer
- Jennifer Keyte – News presenter
- Wendy Stapleton – Singer
- Annette Woodward – Olympian
- Anne Edmonds – Comedian and actor
- Maria Thattil – Model
- Emily Rogers – Olympian
