= Mt St Michael's College =

Location
- Ashgrove, Queensland; Australia
- Coordinates: 27.444361°S 152.988357°E

Information
- Type: Independent, day and secondary
- Motto: Latin: Fide et Amore (In Faith and Love)
- Denomination: Roman Catholic
- Established: 1925; 101 years ago
- Founder: Sisters of Charity
- Principal: Sharon Volp
- Staff: 120
- Gender: Girls
- Enrolment: ~900 (7–12)
- Colours: White, navy and gold
- Affiliation: Catholic Secondary Schoolgirls' Sports Association
- Website: msm.qld.edu.au

Mt St Michael's College is an independent Catholic secondary school for girls located in Ashgrove, Brisbane, Queensland, Australia. It was established in 1925 by the Sisters of Charity at the invitation of James Duhig the Roman Catholic Archbishop of Brisbane.

The college is a member of the Catholic Secondary Schoolgirls' Sports Association. The College is a ministry of Mary Aikenhead Education Australia.

== Location ==
Mt St Michael's College is located 6 kilometres from the Brisbane CBD at 67 Elimatta Drive, Ashgrove.

== History ==
The Sisters of Charity established a convent at the Grantuly homestead in Ashgrove in 1925. The St Finbarr's primary school was founded in that year. The registration for a secondary school, originally known as Grantuly College, was received on 28 April 1928 and the first classes started in 1929. Grantuly College was renamed Mt St Michael's College in 1941 when a new three-story brick building was constructed.

== House system ==
The school is divided into a house system with four houses.

House name	Symbol	Named after	Colour
Rush	Courage	Archbishop Francis Roberts Rush	Red
Stewart	Determination	John Killough Stewart who had resided in Grantuly.	Yellow
Grantuly	Honour	The historic Grantuly homestead	Blue
Aikenhead	Strength	Mother Mary Aikenhead, founder of the Sisters of Charity of Australia	Green

== Campus ==
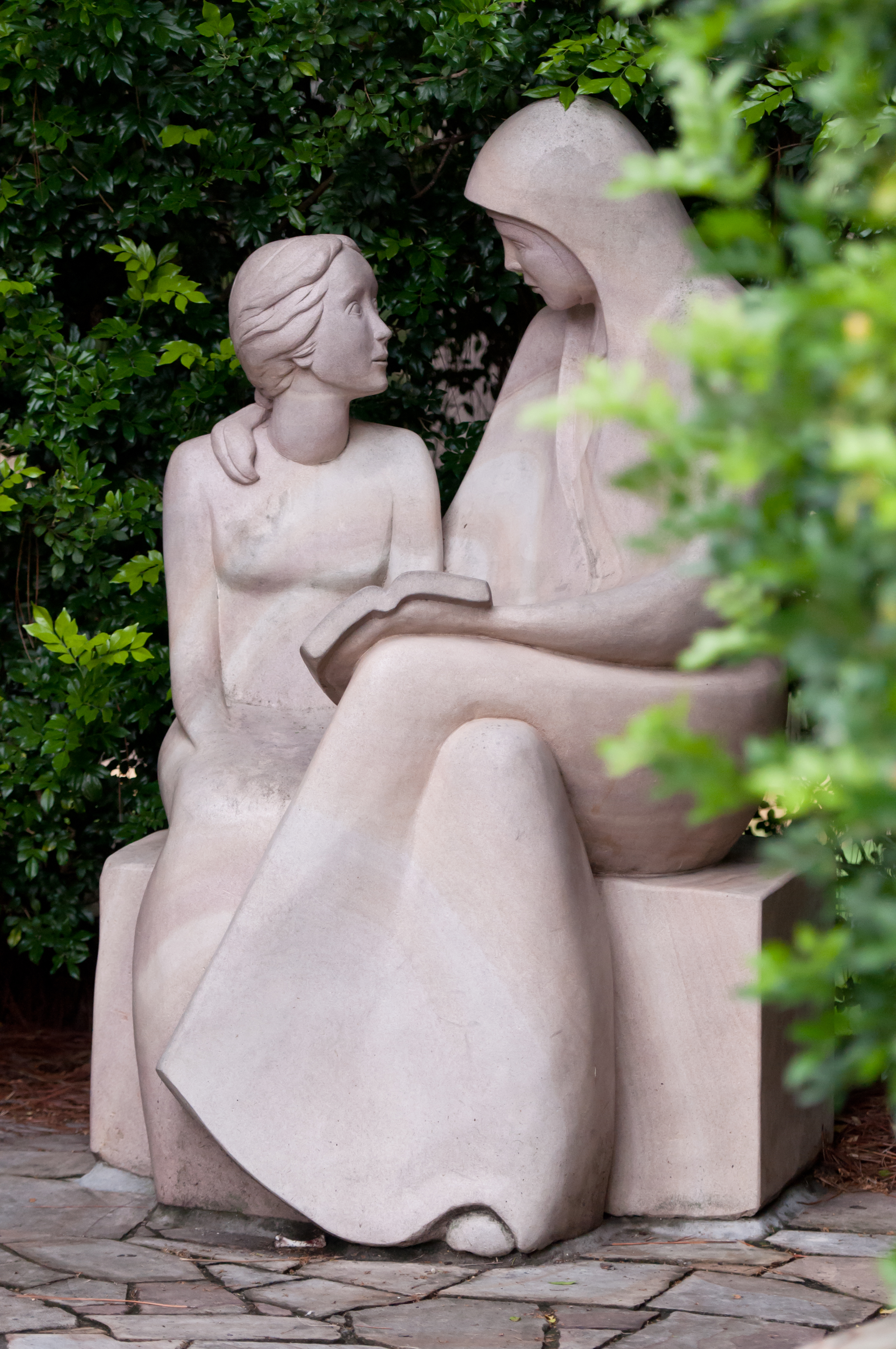
Mary Aikenhead statue

From the original Grantuly homestead where rooms were set up for school, the College campus has seen significant growth and change over the years. Nestled at the top of the convent lawn, in beautiful garden surrounds, the homestead has been magnificently restored and houses the administration centre for the college.

In 1941, the first brick three-story building was constructed on the site. This building has been extended, renovated and expanded over the years.

The Killindarbin building was opened in 1998. The building provides Design Technology facilities and the Mathematics learning hub. The name Killindarbin comes from the Turrbal people who are traditional owners in the area.

In 2011, the Ionian Centre was completed providing facilities for music performance, general learning areas, state of the art science laboratories and a fully equipped Auditorium.

The Sophia Centre is a multipurpose hall that is used for major events, liturgies and whole school activities. It provides spaces for Physical education, Dance and Drama classes during the day.

Completed in 2016, the Arts Precinct provides a creative space for students to express their artistic abilities. The Arts Precinct includes a media production room with green screen, print making facilities, spray paint booth, art classrooms and production room.

== Notable Alumnae ==
Past students of the college are invited to maintain their attachment to the College through the Alumni Association

- Meg Harris, Australian swimmer (Olympics, Commonwealth Games)
- Bridie McKim, Australian actress
- Sonya Walker, Information Technology Industry Leader. Executive Partner IBM, Asia Pacific Australia & New Zealand Quantum Technology Leader, IBM Research, USA. Executive leadership roles including Managing Director at Infor, Oracle Corporation, RSA Security, SAP & SAS. Board Chair and Non-Executive Director roles at Pawsey Supercomputing Centre, The Australian Regenerative Medicine Institute and The Turner Institute for Brain Research.

== See also ==
- Mary Aikenhead
- Sisters of Charity of Australia
- List of schools in Queensland
