= Brigid McGuigan =

Australian nun, schoolteacher and school principal

Mother Mary Francis

Personal life
- Born: Brigid Mary Magdalen McGuigan; 16 January 1842 Braidwood, New South Wales, Australia
- Died: 27 October 1923 (aged 81) Potts Point, Sydney, New South Wales, Australia
- Known for: Superior General, Sisters of Charity of Australia

Religious life
- Religion: Catholic
- Denomination: Roman Catholic
- Order: Sisters of Charity

Brigid Mary Magdalen McGuigan (1842–1923), known by her religious name Sister (later Mother) Mary Francis, was an Australian nun, school teacher and principal who became superior general of the Sisters of Charity of Australia. She made a significant contribution to education and nursing in Australia, establishing and staffing schools and hospitals throughout New South Wales, Victoria and Tasmania.

== Early life and education ==
Brigid McGuigan was born in Braidwood, New South Wales, Australia on 16 January 1842 and was the second of ten daughters of Australian-born grazier John McGuigan, and his wife Ellen, née Foran. Brigid and her older sister Mary were sent as boarders to the Convent of the Presentation of the Virgin, Subiaco in Rydalmere, New South Wales from 1856 to 1859, where they were educated by Benedictine nuns.

== Religious life and career ==
On 22 July 1861, McGuigan entered the Sisters of Charity at St Vincent's Convent located in Darlinghurst, New South Wales. During her novitiate, she was sent to train and teach at Victoria Street Roman Catholic School located in Potts Point, New South Wales, which was later renamed as St Vincent's College. She attained the religious name Sister Mary Francis and was professed on 21 April 1864.

McGuigan worked in New South Wales as a schoolteacher from 1864 to 1869. Her teaching proficiency was recognised early and while working at the Victoria Street school, which had 173 girls and 68 boys, she became headmistress in 1869. She worked as school principal from 1869 to 1882. She applied to the Council of Education in 1872 for promotion which was granted in 1874.

Mother Mary Francis was elected as the first Australian-born Superior General of the Sisters of Charity in 1882. She was re-elected five times and held the position until 1920, when she was succeeded by Mother Mary Berchmans. She then took responsibility for all the institutions run by the Sisters of Charity, including seven schools and St Vincent's Hospital, Sydney. Her election occurred at the same time as the abolition of State Aid funding to non-government schools in New South Wales, which threatened the work of the Sisters in their schools. However, Mother Mary Francis used several other teacher-trained Sisters of Charity to staff the schools. These included sisters Mary Catherine Bruton and Dorothy Josephine Bruton and Mother Mary Berchmans Daly. Over the next 36 years of her career, over 20 schools were staffed or established by the Sisters of Charity.

In 1895, Mother Mary Francis travelled to Europe in the company of another Australian Sister of Charity, Mother Mary Gertrude Davis. After visiting the parent house in Ireland they travelled to Rome where they had a special audience with Pope Leo XIII.

Mother Mary Francis also oversaw an extensive building campaign. This included the 1882 construction of the Sisters of Charity residence, the 1888 and 1892 additions of new wings to St Vincent's Hospital, the 1886 construction of St Joseph's Hospital for consumptives at Parramatta, the building of St Anne's Orphanage in Liverpool, New South Wales in 1888 and construction of private hospitals in Sydney in 1909 and Melbourne in 1913.

=== Death and legacy ===
After a short retirement, Mother Mary Francis died of heart complications on 27 October 1923 in St Vincent's Hospital. She was buried in the Lady Chapel, St Vincent's Convent, Potts Point. The Archbishop of Sydney Michael Kelly presided at the Solemn Requiem Mass and presided at the graveside.

Mother Mary Francis was the first Australian-born Sister of Charity to celebrate her Golden Jubilee celebrated on 21 April 1914, where she was honoured by three bishops and fifty-two priests. The Sisters donated a pipe organ and a Gothic marble altar to the Mother House chapel. Eighteen convents, six hospitals including two private hospitals and the Hospice for the Dying, members of colleges, high schools and primary schools were all represented at the celebrations. On 1 November 2018, the newly opened Sr Francis McGuigan Wing of St Vincent's Private Hospital, Sydney was named in her honour.
