= Mary Healy (Mother Gertrude) =

Australian Sister of Charity and hospital administrator (1865–1952)

Mother Gertrude

Personal life
- Born: Mary Healy; 24 July 1865 Dublin, Ireland
- Died: 28 April 1952 (aged 86) Melbourne, Australia

Religious life
- Religion: Catholic
- Denomination: Roman Catholic
- Order: Sisters of Charity

Mary Healy (24 July 1865 – 28 April 1952), better known as Mother Gertrude, was a member of the Sisters of Charity of Australia and hospital administrator. She made significant contributions to the development of St Vincent's Hospital, Sydney and St Vincent's Hospital, Melbourne.

== Early life ==
Mary Healy was born in Dublin, Ireland in 1865 to ironmonger Francis Healy and his wife Annie (née Carton). Siblings included Rev Joseph Healy, S.J. and architect Denis Healy.

After migrating to Australia with her family, Healy was educated at the Loreto Abbey, Mary's Mount, Ballarat. Here, she came under the influence of Mother Mary Gonzaga Barry and received some teacher training. On 5 June 1889, she entered the Novitiate of the Sisters of Charity and on her profession on 2 October 1891 took the name Sister Gertrude.

== Career ==
=== Nursing career ===
Healy then trained as a nurse, initially working at Sydney's St Vincent's Hospital, where she was appointed Mother Rectress in 1910. The hospital grew significantly during the ten years that Healy was in charge, increasing its number of specialties, building new nursing accommodation, improving a range of out-patient facilities and services, and completing a new story in 1918. During the influenza epidemic of 1919, St Vincent's Hospital admitted over 27,000 urgent cases and treated another 70,000 as outpatients. However, Healy's goal of the hospital becoming a clinical school of the University of Sydney, was ultimately achieved by her successor Anne Daly (also known as Mother Mary Berchmans).

=== Hospital administration ===
After her term at Sydney's St Vincent's Hospital concluded in 1920, Healy was in charge of the Sisters of Charity's adjoining private hospital in Darlinghurst for four years. In 1924, she moved interstate and became the rectress of Melbourne's St Vincent's Hospital. Under her administration this hospital also greatly expanded. Building works paid for by successful fund-raising efforts and a network of auxiliaries supporting the hospital, provided employment to Melburnians during the depression. Healy was responsible for introducing specialist training for dietitians and professional social work to the hospital, hiring the highly qualified social worker Norma Parker as an almoner to undertake a role previously only performed by religious sisters.

Between April and December 1932, Healy travelled to Europe with her superior-general Mother Canice Bruton (née Mary Catherine Bruton) to study the latest in hospital management and the design of modern hospitals. The learnings from this trip influenced subsequent developments at both Melbourne and Sydney's St Vincent's Hospitals. Healy returned to the latter as rectress in 1934, where she served a further nine years before moving to the same position at the much-expanded public hospital. Once again, she introduced a number of new professional specializations. Her plans for expansion into maternity and children's medicine was delayed by the Vatican's ban on religious sisters working in obstetrics, which was not removed until 1936. In 1947, Healy returned once again to her role managing the private hospital.

== Death and legacy ==
Healy died in Sydney, New South Wales, Australia on 28 April 1952 at St Vincent's Hospital and was buried in the Rookwood cemetery. The chairman of the Royal Prince Alfred Hospital, Sir Herbert Schlink, described Healy as one of the greatest hospital administrators in Australia. The Gertrude Healy Wing of St Vincent's Hospital, Melbourne, named in her honor was opened in 1934.
