= Ellen O'Doherty =

Sister of Charity and hospital administrator (1894–1983)

Mother Mary Alphonsus
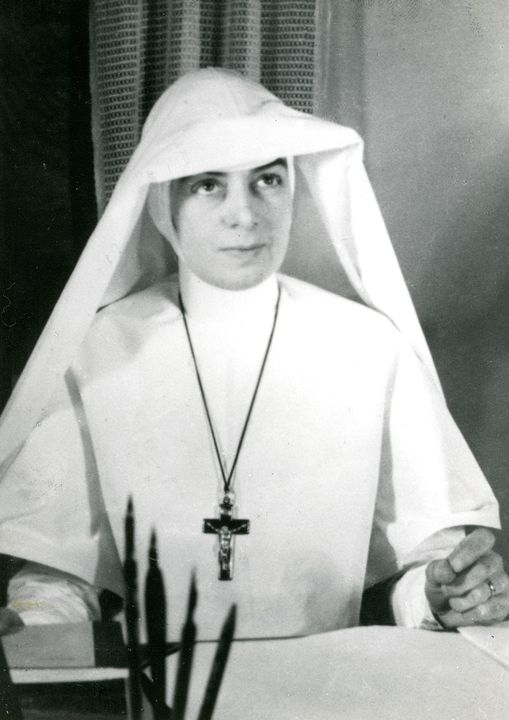

Personal life
- Born: Ellen O'Doherty; 8 February 1894 Yarrawonga, Victoria, Australia
- Died: 11 August 1983 (aged 89) Fitzroy, Melbourne, Victoria, Australia
- Known for: Superior general, nurse and hospital administrator

Religious life
- Religion: Catholicism
- Order: Sisters of Charity

Ellen O'Doherty (1894–1983), known by her religious name as Sister Mary Alphonsus, was an Australian religious who became the superior general of the Sisters of Charity of Australia. She was a skilled nurse and hospital administrator, and worked in many of the order's hospitals, contributing to the growth and successful operations of these facilities.

== Early life ==
Born on 8 February 1894 in South Yarrawonga, Victoria, Australia, Ellen O'Doherty was the daughter of Joseph and Agnes Dorherty. Her father was born in Ireland, and was a schoolteacher. Her mother was born in Victoria. Ellen was the oldest of their nine children.

== Religious life ==
In 1924, O'Doherty joined the Sisters of Charity of Australia. The Religious Sisters of Charity is a religious order founded by Mary Aikenhead in Ireland in 1816. The Australian congregation was established in 1838, and became independent of the Irish congregation in 1842. The sisters focus on education and the care of the ill.

Taking on the religious name of Sister Mary Alphonsus, O'Doherty professed her final vows in 1927. She trained in nursing, and served as a nurse in the order's hospitals in Lismore, Toowoomba, Darlinghurst, and then Bathurst, from 1924 to 1932.

She served briefly as the rectress, or hospital administrator, of the St. Vincent Hospital in Lismore in 1933. The facility had been founded a few years earlier, in 1921. This was a challenging time, as she had to manage the hospital's financial affairs in the midst of the Depression. She was then appointed as rectress for St. Vincent Hospital in Melbourne, where she worked from 1933 to 1939. While there, she was instrumental in establishing the first hospice in Victoria. She was assigned as rectress in the hospital in Toowoomba for two years during World War II, where she oversaw care for wounded soldiers. She then returned to Lismore, where she served a second term as rectress from 1942 to 1948.

In 1949, she was elected superior general of the Australian Congregation of the Sisters of Charity for a six-year term. During her tenure as superior general, she purchased land for a hospice in Brisbane, Queensland, for a hospice. She also purchased property in Wahroonga, New South Wales, for a new novitiate, to accommodate increasing numbers of women seeking to join the order.

O'Doherty travelled to Rome in 1952 for an international gathering of superiors general of Roman Catholic religious orders for women. The superiors were encouraged to think about how their founders would be responding the needs to the world today. Upon her return, she implemented some changes in standards, changed the constitution, and eased out some of the older customs. These changes met with resistance from within her congregation. She was re-elected as superior in 1955, but was forced out of the position by a small group of opponents.

From 1955 to 1974, O'Doherty returned to her role as rectoress at the order's hospitals. She was assigned to the Toowoomba hospital from 1955 to 1961, then went to Melbourne, where she worked at the St Vincent Hospital for eight years, from 1961 to 1968. While she was there, St Vincent opened the first Intensive Care Unit in Australia. The hospital also opened a new unit for open heart surgery and cardiovascular diagnostics, among other improvements. O'Doherty managed the building projects and finances.

In 1969, O'Doherty traveled to Tasmania, where she became the rectress at the hospital in Launceston. She worked there from 1969 to 1974, and stayed on at the Tasmanian convent for another four years. In 1978, she returned to the order's convent in Melbourne, where she lived her last years.

She died in Fitzroy on 11 August 1983, and is buried in Melbourne.

== See also ==
- Health care in Australia
- Nursing in Australia
