= Jennie Brenan =

Australian dancing teacher (1877–1964)

Jennie Frances Brenan
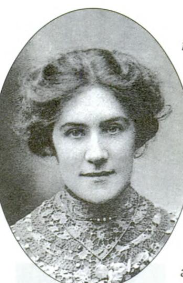
- Born: 24 April 1877; Carlton, Victoria
- Died: 2 February 1964 (aged 86)
- Occupation: dancing master
- Known for: training leading Australian entertainers to dance

Jennie Frances Brenan (24 April 1877– 2 February 1964) was an Australian dancer and dancing teacher. She was encouraged to train as a dancer by J. C. Williamson and in time she opened a dancing school which supplied his dancers and after 1910 those required by the J. C. Williamson's company.

== Biography ==
Brennan was born in 1877 in the Melbourne suburb of Carlton, Victoria. Brenan's mother was Annie Bryce Cooper (born Livingston in Scotland in Edinburgh) and her father James Joseph Brenan was an estate agent born in Ireland. She was educated at a Catholic Ladies College (the Catholic Ladies College was not founded until 1902). However her important education was in dance. She was encouraged in her ambitions by the impresario J. C. Williamson who was a friend of the family. He encouraged her to train with Mary Weir who was one of his dancers and dancing teachers (Weir became Williamson's second wife in 1899). Her wide-ranging training continued with ballet taught by Rosalie Phillipini who was another of J.C.Williamson's dancing teachers.

In 1896 she danced in the Svengali based play Trilby at Bendigo and her dancing was very well received. The performance was bound for Melbourne but Brenan refused to appear as she did not want to be seen dancing immodestly by her friends. Williamson suggested that she direct her skills to teaching and one of his daughters was an early pupil. In 1901-02 she was in London supported by the Williamson company. She was learning more dance from Alexandre Genée.

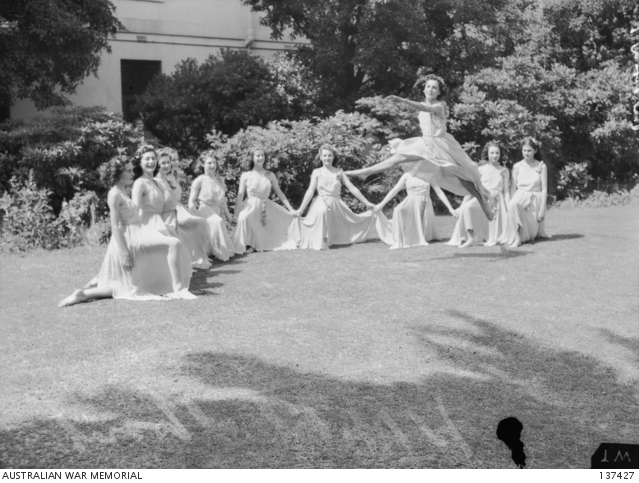
1942 in Melbourne: Jennie Brenan's ballet class entertaining at a WAAAF fun fair

In 1904 she opened a dance studio with her sister Margaret that was to supply dancers to Williamson's production for decades. The studio taught ballroom, ballet and fancy dancing. In 1906 she supplied the choreography and the trained ballet dancers for Williamson's production of Mother Goose. She employed her sister Eileen and they also supplied dancing lessons to private girls' schools. Her own modesty was transferred to her lessons where she demanded a level of decorum and this improved the respectability of dancing per se.

The British Royal Academy of Dancing (RAD) organised its first examinations in Australia and it added the "Royal" in 1936. Brenan used the RAD's methods in Australia and in 1936 she became the RAD's first overseas member of its grand council and she became the chair of RAD's Australian Advisory Committee.

She died in 1964 and in the following year a Jennie Brenan named scholarship for dancing teachers was created by the local RAD.
