= Catholic Ladies College, Eltham =

Location
- Eltham, Melbourne, Victoria; Australia
- Coordinates: 37°42′37″S 145°08′39″E

Information
- Other name: CLC Eltham
- Type: independent single-sex secondary day school
- Religious affiliation: Sisters of Charity
- Denomination: Roman Catholic
- Established: 1902; 124 years ago
- Years: 7–12
- Gender: Girls
- Website: www.clc.vic.edu.au

Catholic Ladies College, Eltham (also known simply as CLC Eltham) is an independent Roman Catholic single-sex secondary day school for girls, located in the Melbourne suburb of Eltham, Victoria, Australia. The school provides a Catholic and general education to girls from Year 7 to Year 12.

== History ==
The school was founded by the Sisters of Charity of Australia in 1902. The school was originally in East Melbourne. The land on which the school was built was bought by Mother Mary Berchmans Daly in 1898.

Under the mother-rectress Mary Catherine Bruton or Mother Canice, in post from 1914, the school performed well in examinations, and the study of science subjects began.

When Damien Broderick's mother attended the school in the 1930s, it was "moderately upmarket".

The school moved to Eltham in 1971.

== Houses ==
The four houses and their associated colours are:

- Loyola, the yellow house, named after St Ignatius of Loyola.
- Marita, the blue house, named in honor of Jesus' mother.
- Aikenhead, the green house, named in honor of Mary Aikenhead.
- Vincentia, the red house, named after St Vincent De Paul.

House activities and competitions include swimming, sports, athletics, and Founders Day activities.

== Academic rankings ==
Better education rank	school	location	Students enrolled in VCE	Median VCE score	scores of 40+ %
38	St Patrick's College	Ballarat	371	30	6
39	St Francis Xavier College	Beaconsfield	415	31	5.8
40	Marymede Catholic College	South Morang	122	29	5.7
41	Catholic Ladies' College	Eltham	210	35	5.6
42	Christian Brother's College	St Kilda East	119	29	5.5
43	Caroline Chisholm Catholic College	Braybrook	281	29	5.2

== Notable former students ==
- Maddy Brancatisano, AFLW player
- Jennie Frances Brenan, (1877–1964), dancing teacher
- Steph Chiocci, AFLW Footballer
- Virginia Haussegger
- Louise Lightfoot, architect, choreographer and dancer
- Kate Moloney, netballer
- Ashleigh Riddell, AFLW player
- Vicki Ward, politician

== See also ==
- List of schools in Victoria, Australia
- Catholic education in Australia
