= Grantuly =

House in Queensland, Australia

Coordinates: 27°26′38″S 152°19′18″E

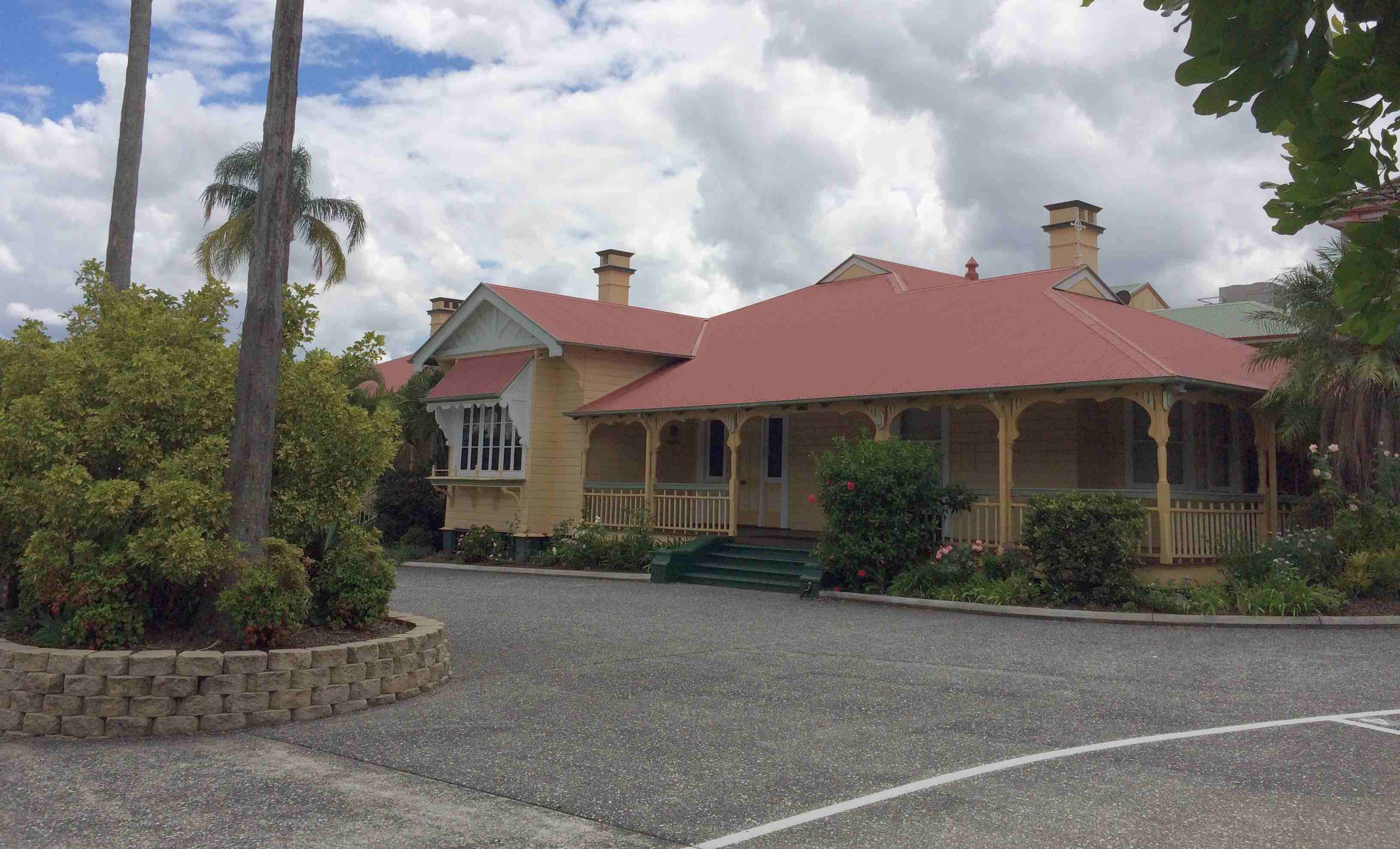
Grantuly, now part of Mt St Michael's College, 2015

Grantuly (sometimes Grantully) is a heritage-listed house at 67 Elimatta Drive, Ashgrove, Brisbane, Queensland, Australia. It is listed on the Brisbane Heritage Register.

== History ==
The house was constructed in 1899 as the home for John Killough Stewart, the son of clothing merchant Alexander Stewart, who built the nearby house Glen Lyon in 1876.

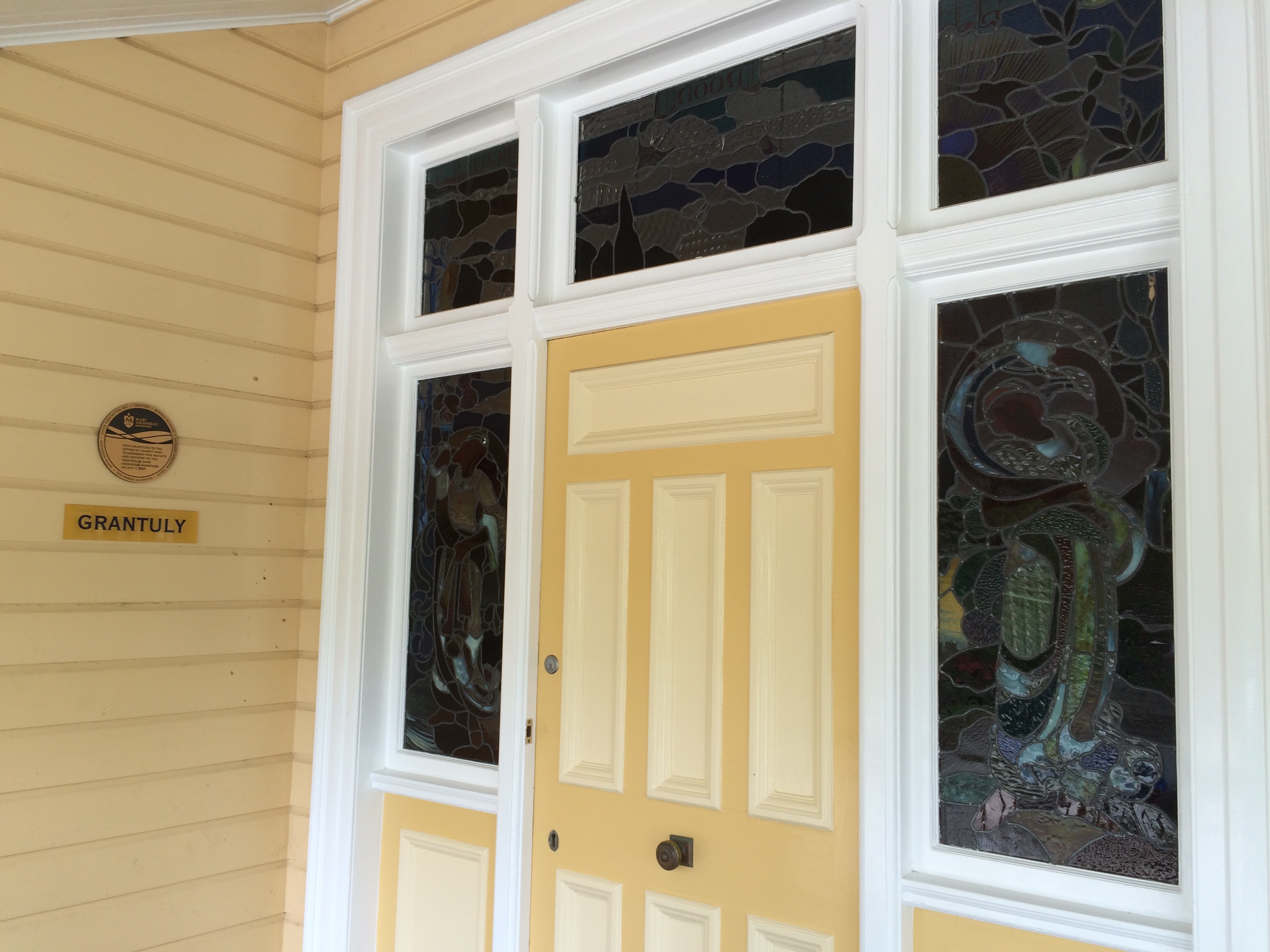
Entrance door to Grantuly with name plaque, 2015

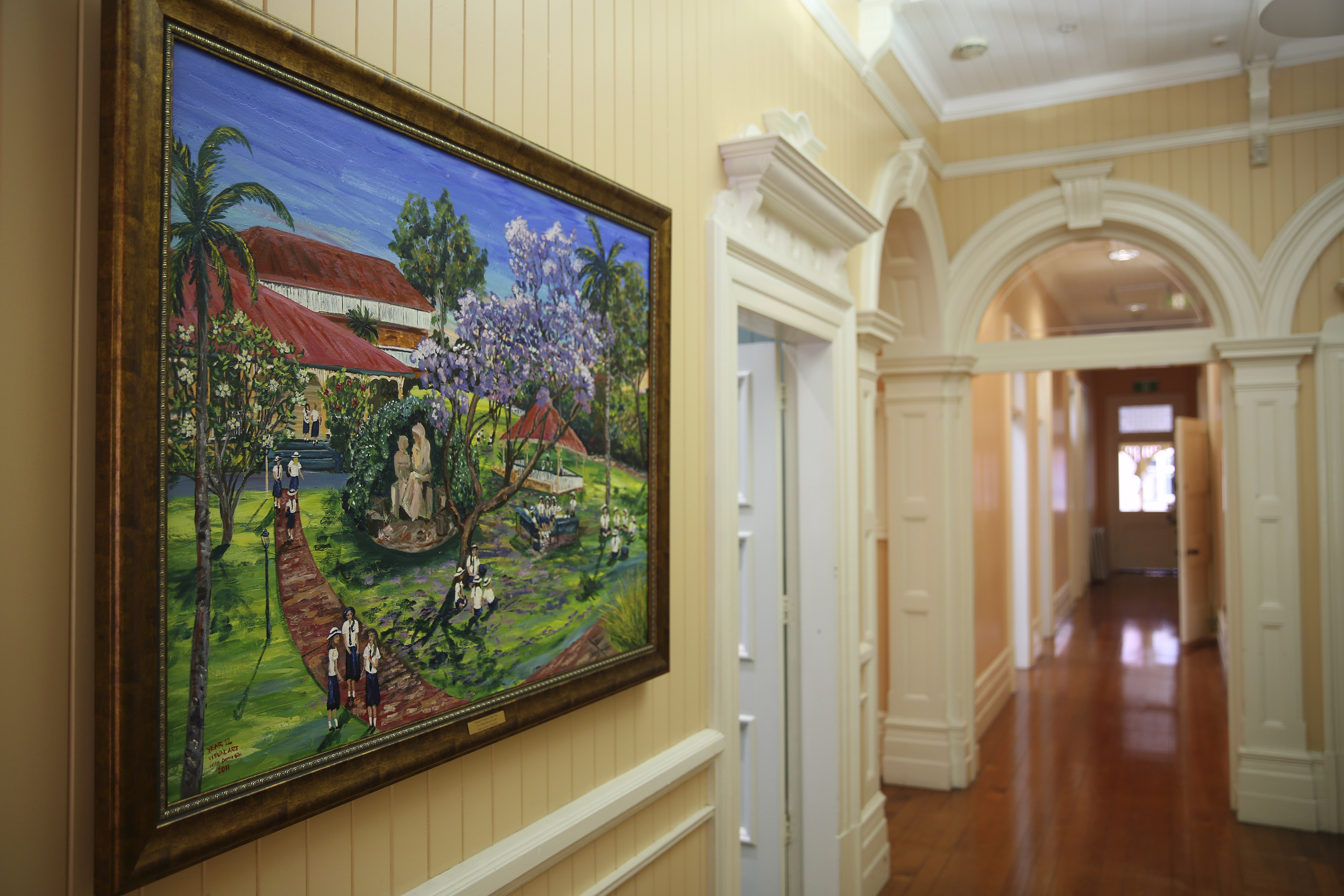
Inside Grantuly, 2013

Grantuly was sold to F. J. Moore, who sold it to Roman Catholic Archbishop of Brisbane James Duhig in 1924. In 1925, Duhig gave the house to the Sisters of Charity to use as their convent as they established St Finbarr's School in the nearby Ashgrove shopping centre. In 1928, the school expanded to include a secondary school called Grantuly College. In 1941, the secondary school was renamed Mt St Michael's College to reflect the need for a "warrior angel" to protect the school during World War II.

== Present day ==
In 2015, Grantuly is the administration centre of Mt St Michael's College.

== Heritage listing ==
Grantuly is listed on the Brisbane Heritage Register, as it:

- provides evidence of the development of the rural residential nature of Ashgrove around the turn of the century
- for the important role it has played in the lives of generations of students who have attended school there since the 1920s.
- for its association with the Stewart family who owned a large estate in Ashgrove from the mid-nineteenth century.
