= St Vincent's Hospital (Brisbane) =

Coordinates: 27.473356°S 153.0349557°E

St. Vincent's Private Hospital (Brisbane)
- Sisters of Charity of Australia
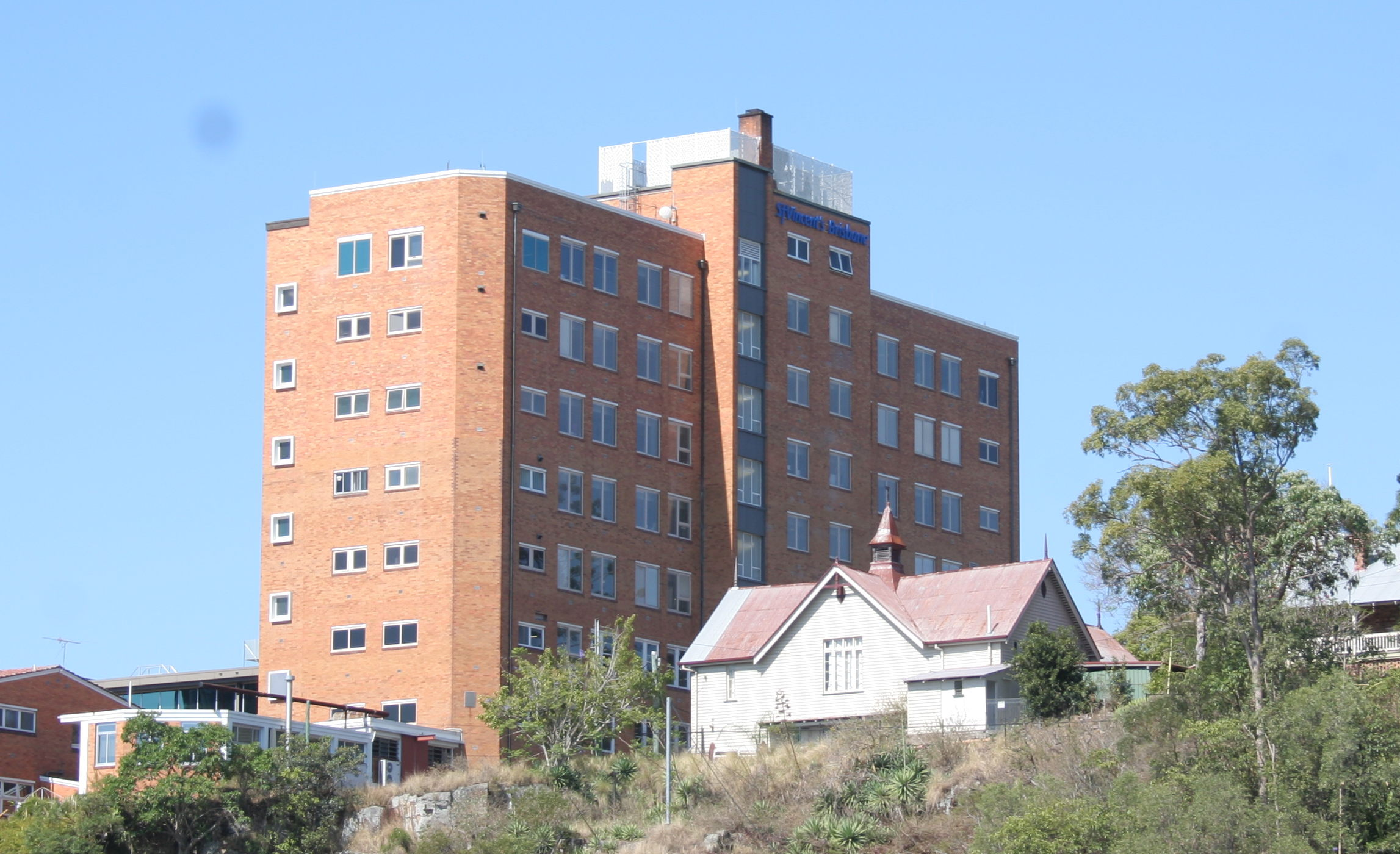

Geography
- Location: Kangaroo Point, Brisbane, QLD, Australia

Services
- Beds: 164

History
- Founded: 1954 (founded), 1957(opened)

Links
- Website: www.svphb.org.au
- Lists: Hospitals in Australia

St Vincent's Private Hospital Brisbane (formerly known as Mount Olivet Hospital) is a hospital located in the suburb of Kangaroo Point in Brisbane, Queensland, Australia.

Mount Olivet Hospital was established in 1957 as a hospice for the terminally ill. It was renamed in 2008 to emphasize its continuity with other hospitals belonging to St Vincent's Health Australia, the largest Catholic non-profit healthcare provider.

The hospital redevelopment to increase its capacity and expand services was completed in 2010.

== History ==
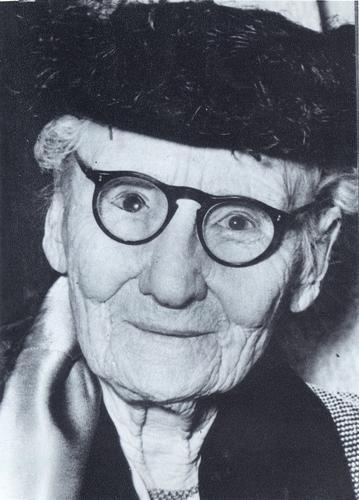
Mary Josephine Bedford, Brisbane, c1954

The land on which the hospital stands originally belonged to Dr Lilian Violet Cooper, Queensland's first female doctor and surgeon. After her death in 1947, Dr Cooper's lifelong friend Mary Josephine Bedford donated the land to the Sisters of Charity to establish a hospice for the sick and dying, particularly for those who were poor.

== Transport ==
The hospital is accessible by bus

- 234 Woolloongabba Bus Station – City
- 234 City – Woolloongabba Bus Station (loop service)
