= St Vincent's College, Potts Point =

St Vincent's College

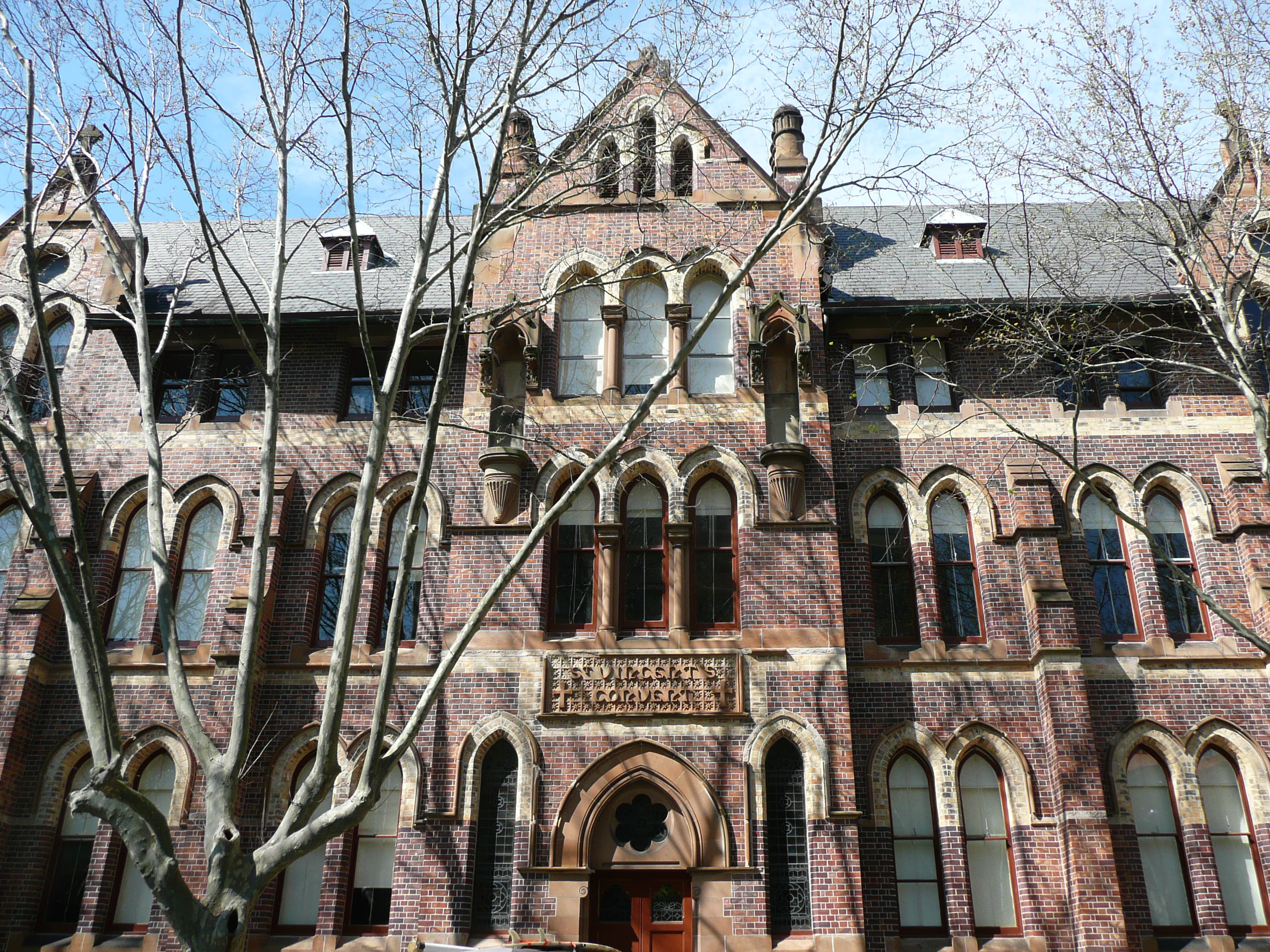
- St Vincent's College

Location
- Rockwall Crescent; Potts Point, Sydney, 2011; Australia; 33°52′9″S 151°13′26″E

Information
- Former name: Victoria Street Roman Catholic School
- Type: Independent single-sex]secondary day and boarding school
- Motto: Latin: Scientia cum Religione (Religion and Knowledge united)
- Religious affiliation: Sisters of Charity
- Denomination: Roman Catholic
- Patron saints: Saint Vincent de Paul; Saint Ignatius of Loyola
- Established: 1858; 168 years ago
- Educational authority: New South Wales Department of Education
- Principal: Anne Fry
- Staff: c. 63
- Years: 7–12
- Gender: Girls
- Enrolment: c. 620 (2007)
- Campus type: Urban
- Colours: Blue, gold and white
- Nickname: Vinnies
- Affiliations: Association of Heads of Independent Schools of Australia; Australian Boarding Schools' Association; Alliance of Girls' Schools Australasia; Association of Heads of Independent Girls' Schools
- Website: www.stvincents.nsw.edu.au

St Vincent's College (colloquially known as Vinnies), is an independent Roman Catholic single-sex secondary day and boarding school for girls, located in Victoria Street, Potts Point, an inner-city suburb of Sydney, Australia.

The college is the oldest registered Catholic girls' school in Australia, founded by the Sisters of Charity as a co-educational primary school in 1858. St Vincent's College follows the spirituality of Ignatius of Loyola. The college has a non-selective enrolment policy and currently caters for approximately 714 girls in Years 7 to 12, including approximately 61 boarders.

St Vincent's is affiliated with the Association of Heads of Independent Schools of Australia (AHISA), the Australian Boarding Schools' Association (ABSA), the Alliance of Girls' Schools Australasia (AGSA), and is a member of the Association of Heads of Independent Girls' Schools (AHIGS).

== History ==
St Vincent's College was founded as the Victoria Street Roman Catholic School, by the Sisters of Charity in 1858, a year after the sisters established St Vincent's Hospital at the same site.

The school reopened as St Vincent's College, a secondary, fee-paying, private, independent school in May 1882, after the hospital's relocation to the neighbouring suburb of Darlinghurst.

In 2009 Mary Aikenhead Ministries (MAM) was established by the Holy See at the request of the Congregation of the Religious Sisters of Charity of Australia and the St Vincent's College was transferred to MAM.

In 2018 St Vincent's College celebrated its 160th anniversary and in 2019 its 135th year of boarding.

== Principals ==
Period	Details
1858–1864	Aloysius Raymond
1865–1881	Frances McGuigan
1882–1896	Ursula Brutin
1897–1912	Gerard Ryan
1912–1920	Kevin Purtell
1921–1922	Benedicta Martin
1923–1925	Joachim Burns
1926–1936	Dympna Bruton
1937	Carmella Kissane
1938–1943	Francis Jerome Donovan
1944	Maria Joseph Hegarty
1945–1948	Marion Corless
1949	Peter Fenessy
1950	Laurence Young
1951–1955	Isabel Waldron
1956–1959	Joan Jurd
1960	Amadeus Paine
1961	Genevieve Campbell
1962–1969	Marion Corless
1970–1976	Mildred Carroll
1977–1983	Maria Wheeler
1984–1994	Margaret Beirne
1995–2001	Caroline Duhigg
2002–2008	Michelle Huggonet
2009–2014	Fay Gurr
2015–present	Anne Fry

== Notable alumnae ==
- Lyn Ashley – actress
- Natarsha Belling – journalist and newsreader
- Kerrie Biddell – an Australian jazz and session singer, as well as a pianist and vocal teacher.
- Grace Boelke – one of the first female graduates in medicine from the University of Sydney
- Kerry Bray – awarded OAM in 2020 for 40 years of organising community running.
- Kathleen Commins (1909–2003) was an Australian journalist, the first female editor of Australia's oldest literary journal, Hermes (in 1931). Commins joined the Sydney Morning Herald in 1934 and became the first female sports writer in Australia, then became the first female executive at the Sydney Morning Herald, as Assistant to the Chief of Staff from 1948 to 1969.
- Melinda Gainsford-Taylor – Australian athlete and Olympian
- Alexandra Hargreaves – rugby player
- Deni Hines – singer and actress
- Winnie Kiap – Papua New Guinea High Commissioner to the United Kingdom
- Karen Krantzcke (deceased) – tennis player – ranked seventh in women's tennis singles in 1970. The WTA named an award – The Karen Krantzke Sportsmanship Award in her honour.
- Neta Maughan – an Australian piano teacher, was appointed a Member of the Order of Australia in 2010 "For service to music education as a teacher of piano, voice and music theory, to professional organisations, and as a mentor of young performers".
- Professor Anne Mijch – responsible for opening the first AIDS clinic in Melbourne. Awarded OAM in 1998 for service to medicine, particularly in the treatment and care given to patients suffering from infectious diseases including HIV/AIDS.
- Marjorie O'Neill – Member of the New South Wales Parliament for Coogee
- Colleen Pyne – awarded OAM in 1999 for services to education, and to the establishment of the North Australia Research Unit
- Patricia Rolfe – journalist and foreign correspondent for the Women's Weekly
- Gemma Sisia – humanitarian who established the School of St Jude in Tanzania in 2002, which "provides free, high-quality education to over 1,800 of the poorest Tanzanian children while boarding more than 1,400 students."
- Kate Wild – investigative journalist and author, Walkley Award and Logie winner
- Lara Worthington – philanthropist and businesswoman
- Nichola Constant – Chief Commissioner of the Industrial Relations Commission of New South Wales

== See also ==
- List of non-government schools in New South Wales
- List of boarding schools in Australia
- Catholic education in Australia
