= Gemma Sisia =

Australian humanitarian (born 1971)

Gemma Sisia, AM
- Born: 3 November 1971 (age 55)
- Known for: Establishing The School of St Jude
- Children: 4

Gemma Sisia OAM (born Gemma Rice; 3 November 1971) is an Australian humanitarian who founded The School of St Jude in Tanzania in 2002. The school provides free, high-quality education scholarships to over 1,801 of the brightest and most deserving Tanzanian children, with boarding for its ¬1,400 secondary students.

== Early life and education ==
Sisia was raised on a wool sheep property in Armidale, New South Wales, Australia. She is the only daughter among the eight children of Sue and Basil Rice. As a child, she competed in show jumping and spent time mustering sheep, swimming, and fishing in the waterfalls at the family property.

Growing up, her family emphasised the importance of education. Sisia attended Holy Trinity in Inverell before enrolling at St Vincent's College, Potts Point in Sydney. She completed a science degree, majoring in genetics and biochemistry at The University of Melbourne, followed by an honours program in the Northern Territory. She later obtained a Diploma of Education from the University of New England in Armidale.

At age 22, she moved to Uganda to volunteer as a teacher in a convent school, where she taught girls science and sewing. This experience led her to believe that a free, high-quality education should be the right of all children. During her time in Uganda, she travelled to neighbouring Tanzania and met Richard Sisia, a Tanzanian safari driver. They later married and her father-in-law gifted the newlyweds a small plot of land in Arusha, Tanzania to start the school.

== The School of St Jude ==
In January 2002, Sisia established The School of St Jude in Arusha, Tanzania, with fundraising support from Australia. The school opened with one volunteer teacher and three students. Today, it provides free education to over 1,800 students at the primary and secondary levels. The school accepts applications from three regions in Tanzania and employs over 350 staff members across three campuses, 99% of whom are local Tanzanians.

Each year, Sisia returns to Australia for a fundraising tour to support the school. She is often joined by alumni who share their experiences with the school and its impact. The events, held in various cities across Australia, include public speaking engagements, charity dinners, and community initiatives. These activities aim to raise funds for the school's operations and support its educational programs.

== Awards and recognition ==
Sisia has received international recognition for her work through various awards and media coverage. In 2007, she was awarded the Medal of the Order of Australia (OAM).

Her story has been featured twice on the ABC TV documentary program Australian Story - first in 2005 and again in 2009. In 2016, she was featured on Nine Network's 60 Minutes.

In 2012, she was named one of The Australian Financial Review and Westpac's 100 Women of Influence, nominated in the global category. In the same year, she was a finalist for the New South Wales Australian of the Year award.

Sisia was awarded the Sapphire Paul Harris Fellow recognition by Rotary International in 2000 and again in 2019. This honour is given to individuals who have made exceptional contributions to their communities and Rotary's humanitarian efforts.

Sisia is also the author of St Jude’s (2007), a memoir about her life and the establishment of the school. An updated account of the school's history, entitled The School That Hope Built was later published in 2023, written by former employee Madeleine Kelly.

== Current life ==
Sisia has four children and has lived in Tanzania for over 25 years. In addition to her work at The School of St Jude, she and her husband run a safari company in Tanzania.

She remains actively involved in the daily operations of the school, overseeing its growth and continuing to be a prominent advocate for education. She regularly speaks at international conferences and forums, highlighting the critical role of education as a tool to combat poverty.
