= Mary Catherine Bruton =

Australian religious sister

Mary Catherine Bruton (1862–1937) was the superior-general of the Sisters of Charity of Australia from 1924 – 1936 and also served as an educator and a hospital administrator. She was better known as Mother Canice.

== Early life ==
Mary Catherine Bruton was born on May 13, 1862, in Sydney, Australia to Irish parents and into a strongly Roman Catholic family. She and her sisters were first taught by a German tutor in Tocumwal and were subsequently educated at Loreto Abbey, Ballarat, Victoria and St. Vincent's College.

== Religious life ==
She entered the Sisters of Charity of Australia, as had two of her aunts (one of whom was known as Mother Cecilia Bruton and the other as Sister Mary Ursula) and as did three of her sisters (who became Sister Mary Dympna, Sister Mary Urseline, and Sister Mary Abban). She entered in 1886 and took the name Canice. She was formally professed on October 13, 1888. Her initial postings were in New South Wales. She served as Mother Superior at St. Mary's Convent in Liverpool from 1900 to 1913 and was Mother Superior of Monte Oliveto Convent and School, Woollahra. She also served as mother-rectress of Catholic Ladies College in East Melbourne and was credited with starting the study of science there and establishing a curriculum that enabled its students to score well on standardized exams.

She served as first assistant to the superior-general in 1920–24, which included responsibility for St Vincent's Hospital, established in Toowoomba, Queensland in 1922.

In 1924, she was elected superior-general and served in that role until 1936. During that period, she founded a convent in New Norfolk, Tasmania, and two in Queensland (at Ashgrove and Kingaroy).

In 1932, she traveled abroad to Rome and to Dublin representing the Australian order at a Congress of the Sisters of Charity. She was accompanied by Mary Healy (Mother Gertrude) and the two studied modern hospital management and design. In July 1936, at the completion of her term as superior-general, she became the superior of the Sacred Heart Hospice for the Dying. In that role, she succeeded her deceased aunt, Mother Cecelia Bruton, who had founded the institution and led it for 29 years until her death.

== Death and burial ==
She lived out her life at the Sacred Heart Hospice for the Dying and died there on October 15, 1937. She was buried at Rookwood Cemetery.
