= School of St Jude =

The School of St Jude
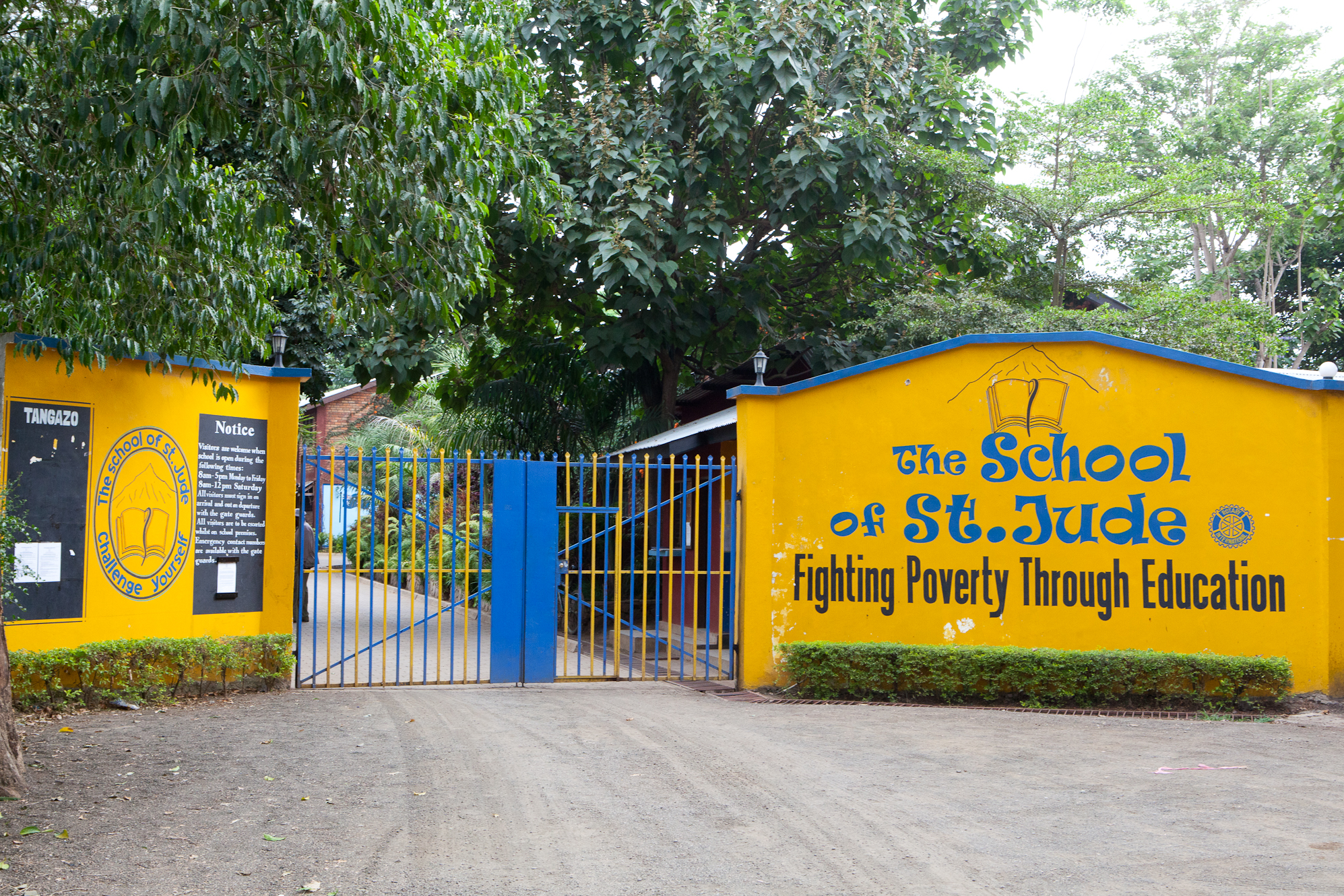
- The School of St Jude's front gate

Location
- Arusha, Arusha Region; Tanzania; 3°23′29″S 36°44′23″E

Information
- Type: Independent, boarding school, Non-governmental organization
- Motto: "Fighting Poverty Through Education"
- Denomination: Non-denominational
- Established: 2002 (24 years ago)
- Employees: Over 300 local Tanzanian staff members
- Key people: Gemma Sisia (founder and director)
- Gender: Co-educational
- Enrolment: Approx 1,800 students
- Colours: Navy, blue and yellow
- Nickname: St Jude's
- Website: schoolofstjude.org

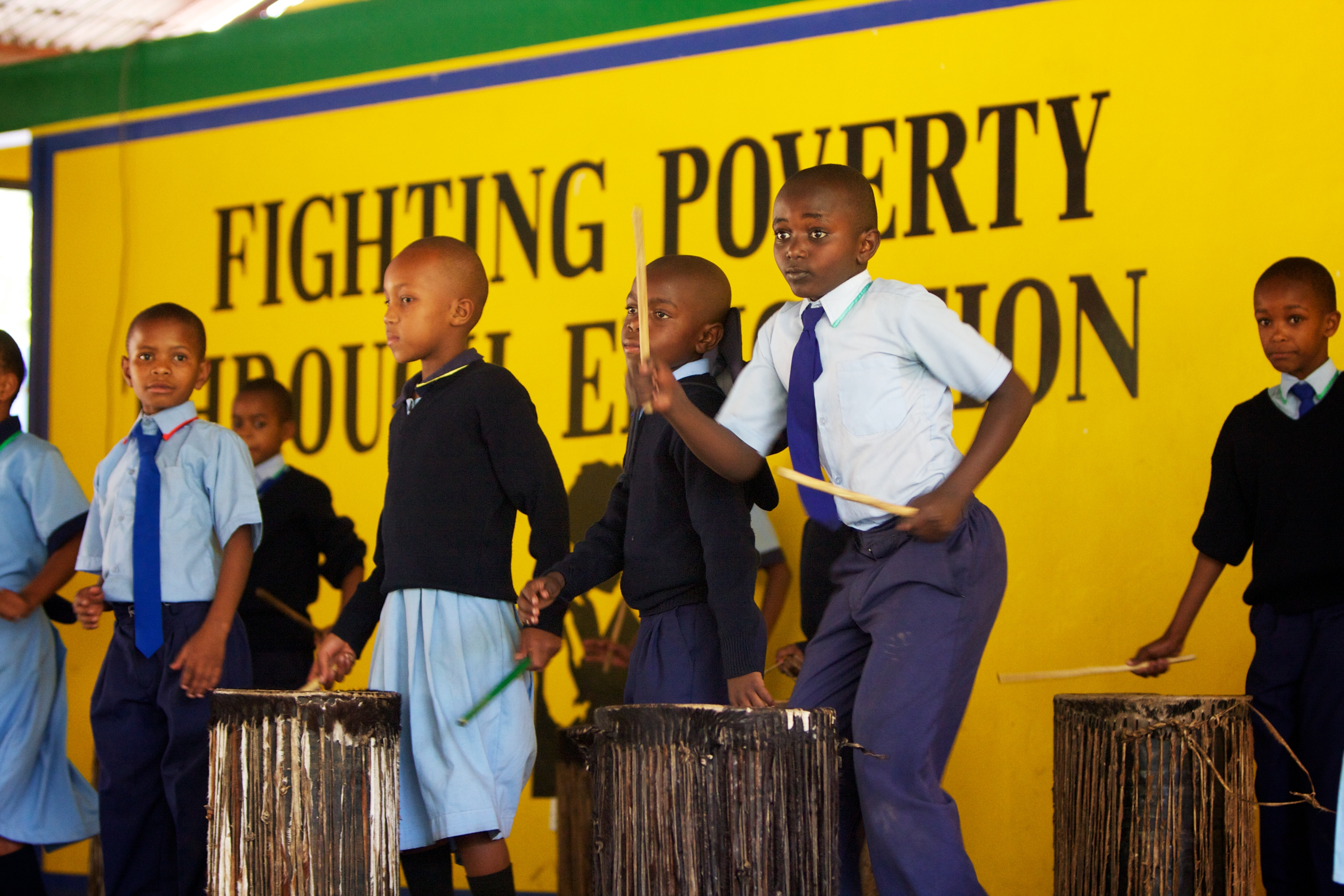
The School of St Jude's students at assembly

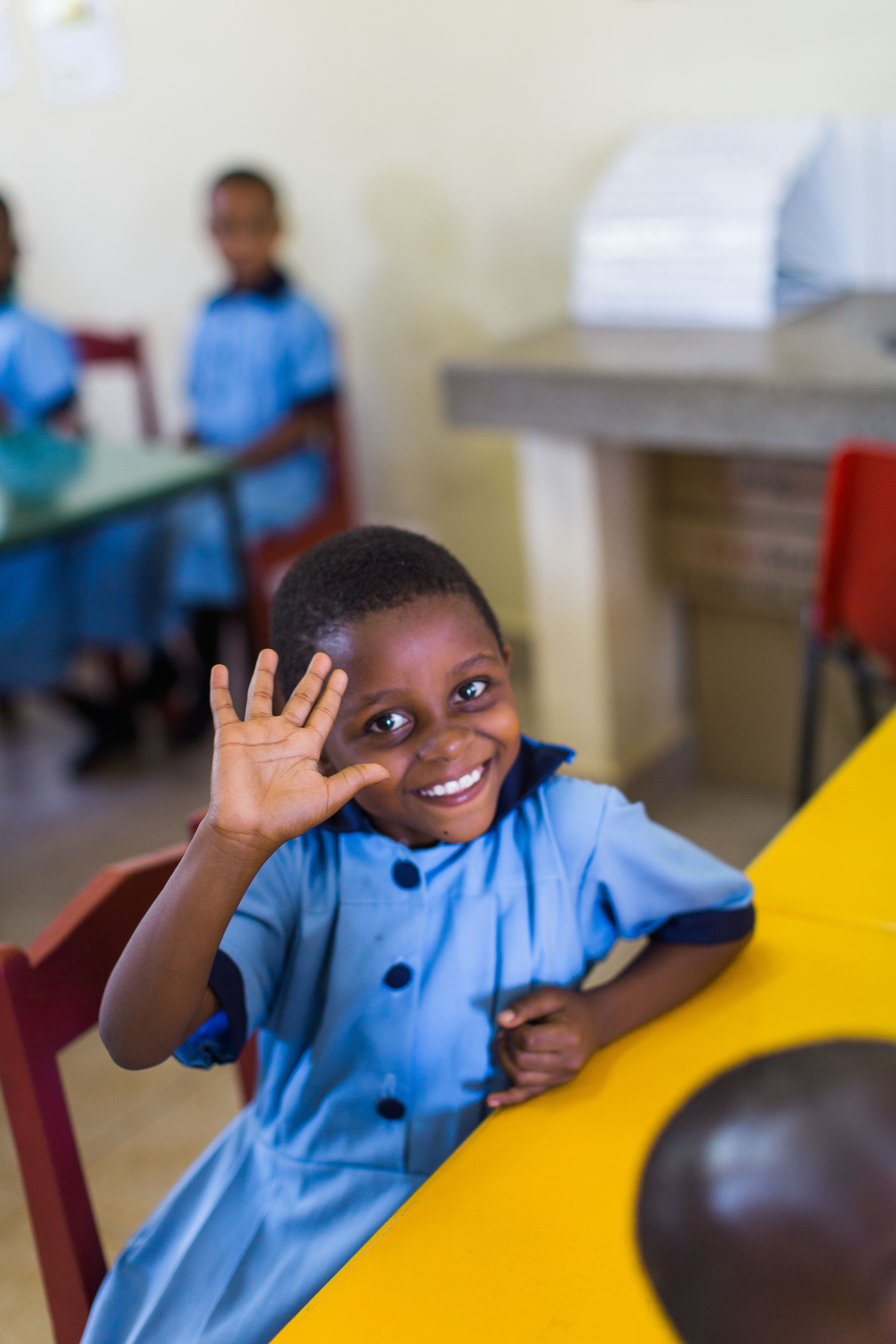
Student at The School of St Jude in Arusha, Tanzania

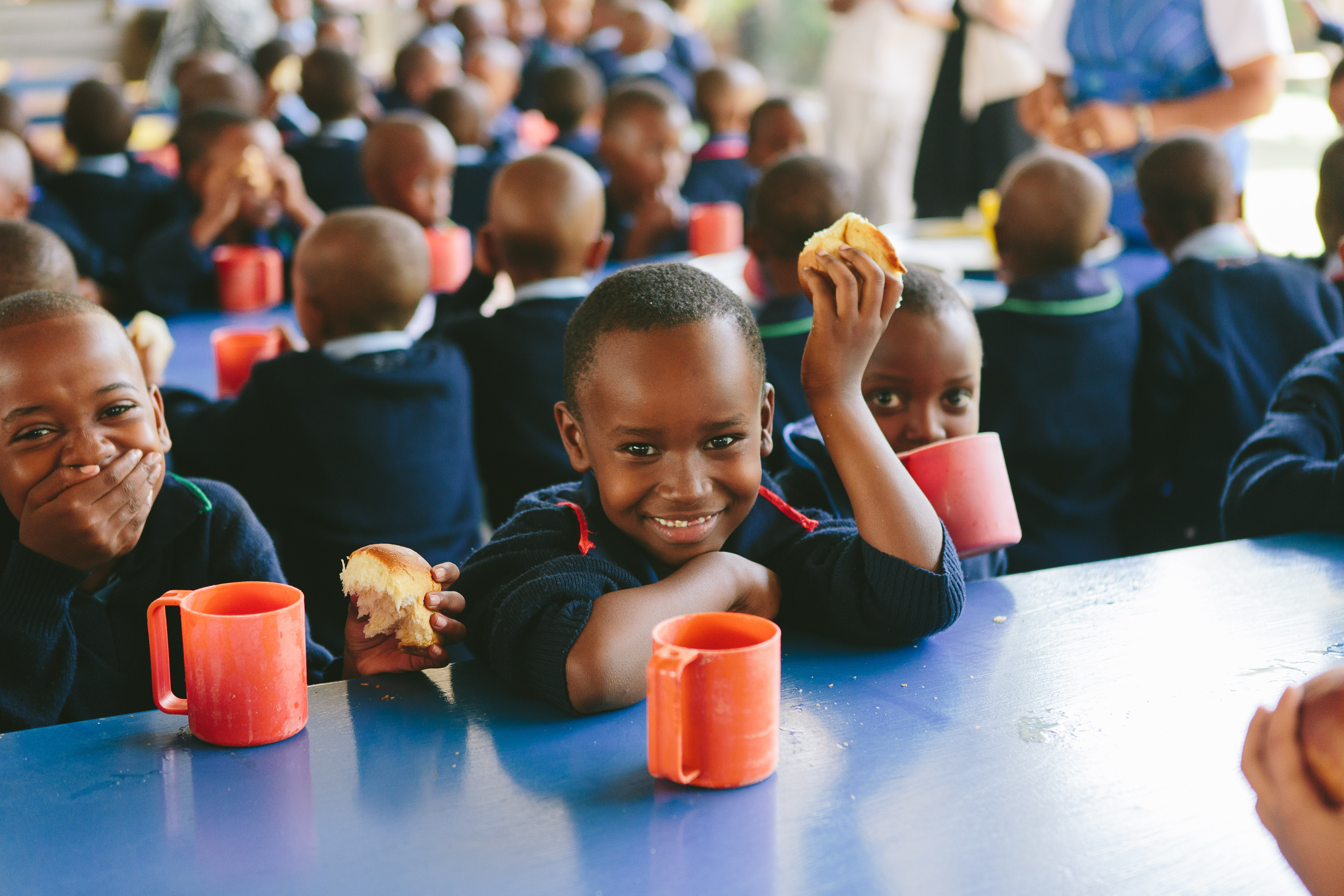
MorningTea LowerPrimary 03.02.2014 10

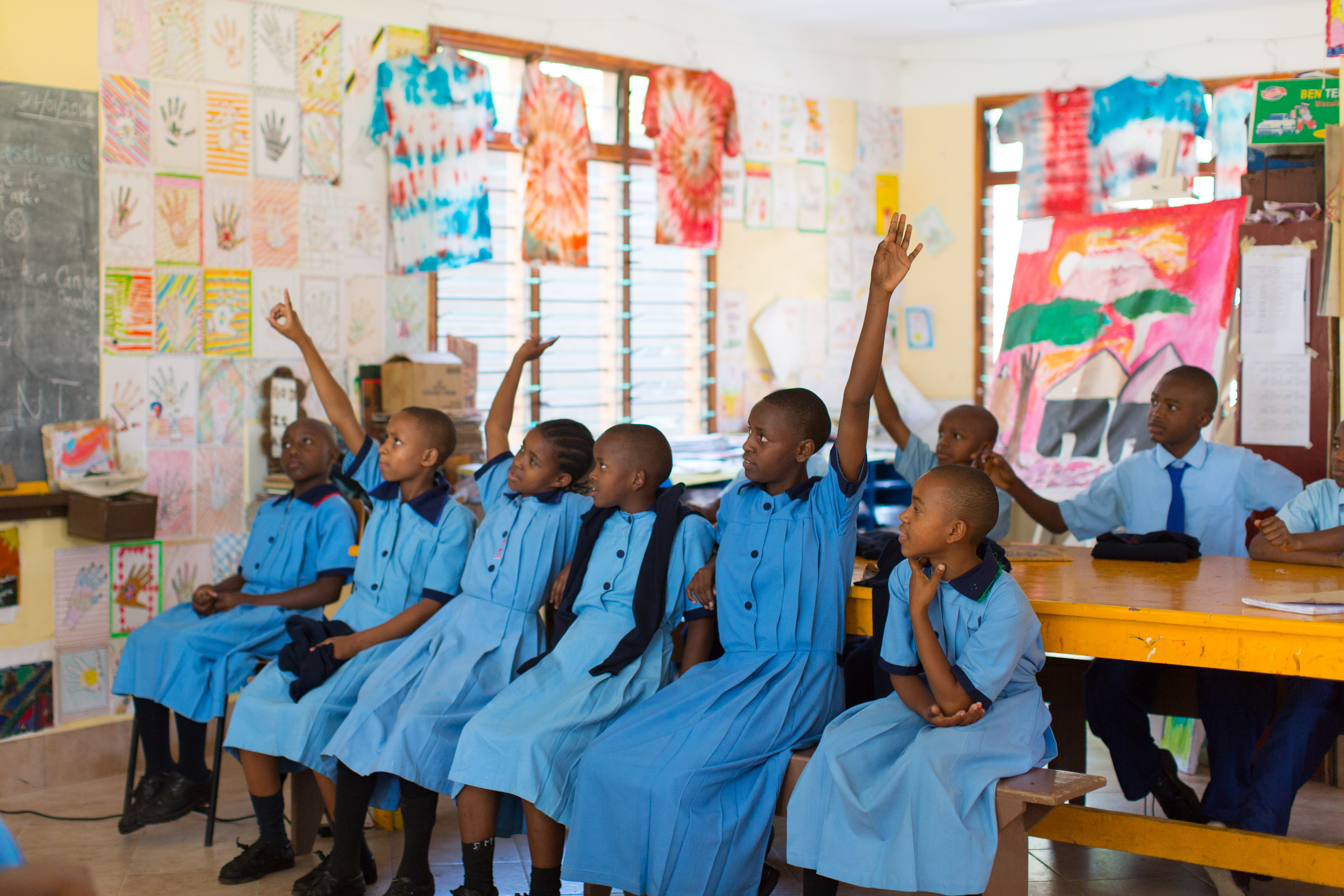
General 28.01.2014 21

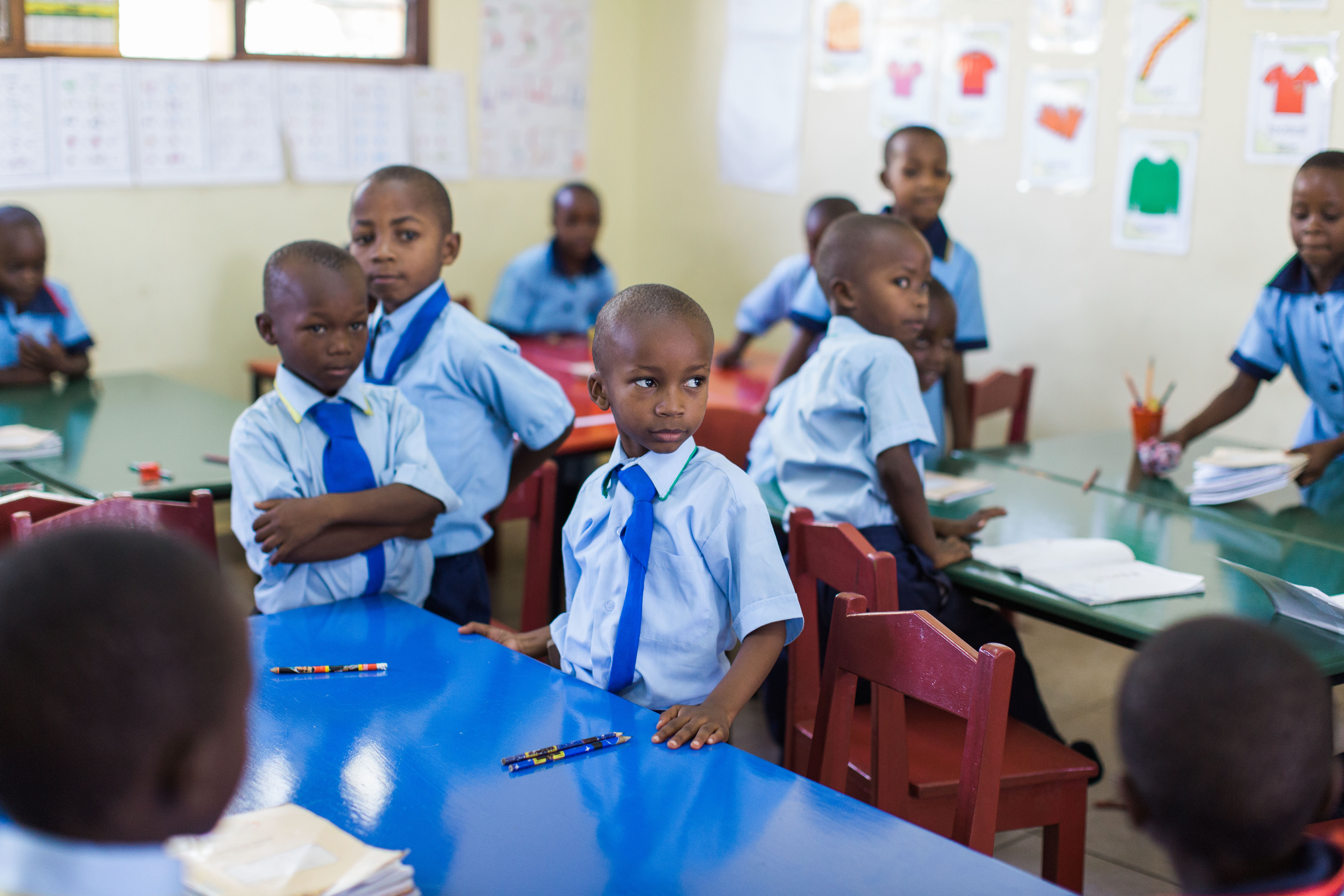
Students in the classroom

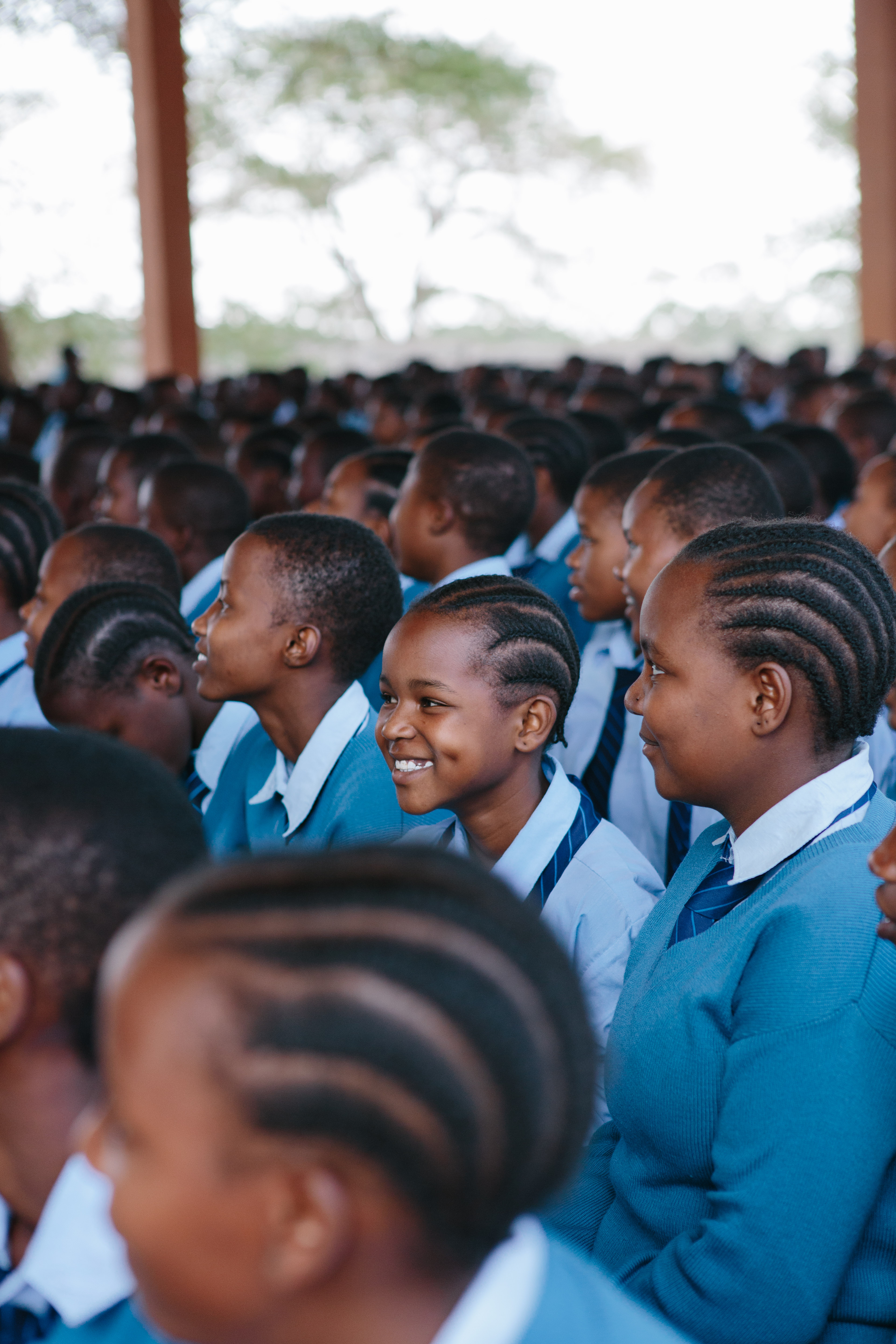
SmithCampusAssembly 30.01.2014 6

The School of St Jude is a charity-funded school located in the city of Arusha, in Northern Tanzania, providing free primary and secondary education to bright students from poor backgrounds. Established in 2002 by Australian Gemma Sisia, the school operates three campuses and has 1,800 students. It also offers boarding to more than 1,400 students and supports secondary school graduates through higher education scholarships. The school is funded entirely by donations, with a significant portion coming from Australian sponsors.

== History ==
St Jude’s was founded in January 2002 by Australian Gemma Sisia, who named it after St Jude, the patron saint of hopeless causes. The school began with just three students and one volunteer teacher, with the mission of fighting poverty through education. Over the years, it has expanded to accommodate over 1,800 students across its campuses and an operation that involves more than 300 Tanzanian staff members.

The school’s admissions process prioritises students who demonstrate strong academic potential and financial need. Selection includes academic testing and home visits to assess socioeconomic conditions. St Jude’s provides students with textbooks, uniforms, transport, meals, and, for secondary students, boarding facilities.

== Campuses and Facilities ==
St Jude’s operates across three campuses:

- Sisia Campus (Moshono village): Houses the primary school, head office, and St Jude’s Girls’ Secondary School.
- Moivaro Boarding Campus (Moivaro village): Accommodates all boarding students from the girls’ school.
- Smith Campus (Usa River village): Hosts St Jude’s Secondary School, offering boys-only Ordinary Level (O Level; Forms 1 to 4) secondary education and co-educational Advanced Level (A Level; Forms 5 and 6) studies.

Across the three campuses, the school has three libraries, 11 science labs, and 12 IT labs. Sports facilities include football fields, basketball and tennis courts, netball and volleyball courts, and an Art Gallery showcasing student artwork. A farm at Smith Campus supplements the school’s food supply.

A fleet of 25 school buses transport primary school students and staff to and from school daily.

== Programs ==
=== Beyond St Jude’s Scholarship Program (BSJSP) ===
Launched in 2015, BSJSP supports secondary school graduates pursuing higher education while encouraging community engagement. Participants first complete a Community Service Year, volunteering in understaffed government schools to teach subjects like science and mathematics. Those who fulfil this requirement can apply for scholarships covering tuition and living expenses for university or college.

In 2020, the program expanded to include an Alternative Pathways Program for students opting for certificate or diploma courses instead of A Level studies. This pathway also includes a community service component.

In 2021, the first group of St Jude’s educated students graduated from universities as medical doctors.

== Recognition and Impact ==
St Jude’s has received media coverage for its impact on education in Tanzania, particularly in increasing opportunities for students living in poverty. The school’s academic performance is consistently high, with its students regularly achieving top results in national examinations.

Their annual Science Day has showcased student projects and innovations that have gained recognition internationally, winning for their creators prizes like The Children’s Climate Prize, Young Scientist Tanzania, and Anzisha Prize. Some students have transformed their science projects into successful start-ups.

There are two books about the school: St Jude's, written by its founder Gemma Sisia in 2007, and The School That Hope Built, a later account written in 2023 by former employee Madeleine Kelly.

== International Support and Partnerships ==
Rotary Australia played a significant role in the early development of the school. In 2000, the Armidale Central Rotary Club in New South Wales, Australia organised a volunteer team to build the first classroom block at the school. Since its establishment, Rotary clubs across Australia have continued to support through student sponsorships and financial contributions to the school.

Gemma Sisia tours Australia annually to raise funds for the school, often accompanied by alumni, and meets with donors and sponsors. Additionally, the US branch, American Friends of the School of St Jude, plays a key role in supporting fundraising efforts in the United States.

== Visiting the School ==
As part of its fundraising activities, the school welcomes numerous visitors annually. These visitors include sponsors who support students at the school. Visitors can take part in day tours of the school grounds and stay in local accommodations.

== See also ==
- Education in Tanzania
- List of schools in Tanzania
