= Anne Daly =

Australian Sister of Charity and founder of hospitals

Anne Daly, Mother Mary Berchmans

Personal life
- Born: 28 May 1860 Tipperary, Ireland
- Died: 4 March 1924 (aged 63) St Vincent's Hospital, Sydney, Australia

Religious life
- Religion: Christian
- Order: Sisters of Charity of Australia

Anne Daly or Mother Mary Berchmans (28 May 1860 – 4 March 1924) was an Irish-Australian superior general of the Sisters of Charity of Australia and founded numerous hospitals in Australia, as well as being active in education.

== Early life ==
Anne Daly was born in Tipperary on 28 May 1860. Her parents were John, a blacksmith, and Mary Daly (née Cleary). She had 8 siblings. The family emigrated to Australia in 1865, settling in Jembaicumbene near Braidwood, New South Wales. Daly was privately educated at home. She applied to the Department of Public Instruction in May 1877, and was appointed an assistant at Braidwood Catholic School. After further training she taught at Newtown Girls’ School, Grafton Primary, and St Mary's Cathedral Girls' School, Sydney.

== Career ==
St Mary's Cathedral Girls’ School was run by the Sisters of Charity, and on 28 May 1881 she entered their congregation at St Vincent's, Potts Point. She received the habit on 22 October 1881, professing on 3 January 1884 as Sister Mary Berchmans. She taught at St Mary's until December 1888, when she was appointed to the Sisters' congregation in Melbourne where she ran St Patrick's School, Victoria Parade. She became superior of the Melbourne convent in 1892, with responsibility for St Patrick's and four other primary schools founded by the Sisters between 1891 and 1897.

The Melbourne convent moved into hospital care in 1893, opening a seven-bed St Vincent's Hospital for the sick poor of the inner city. Daly was the rectress of the hospital, a position she held for the next 30 years. The hospital grew quickly under her leadership, receiving government funding from 1903, and had 120 beds by 1905. She established a nurses' training school affiliated to the Royal Victorian Trained Nurses' Association in 1903, and then in 1910, St Vincent's Clinical School, associated with the University of Melbourne. In 1913 she founded Mount St Evins, a private hospital. From 1911, Daly was involved in the process for the beatification of Mother Mary Aikenhead.

She also, in 1898, bought the land on which the Catholic Ladies College was built three years later.

She was elected superior general of the Australian congregation in 1920, and returned to Sydney. In 1920 she oversaw the foundation of a hospital in Queensland, two further hospitals in New South Wales, and a clinical school at St Vincent's Hospital, Sydney.

== Death and legacy ==
Daly died on 4 March 1924 in St Vincent's Hospital, Sydney, and was buried at Rookwood Cemetery, Sydney. In August 1935, a bronze bust of Daly by Paul Raphael Montford was unveiled in commemoration of her foundation of St Vincent's Hospital, Melbourne, with the hospital opening of the Berchmans Daly wing in October 1960.
