= Sisters of Charity of Australia =

Congregation of religious sisters in Australia

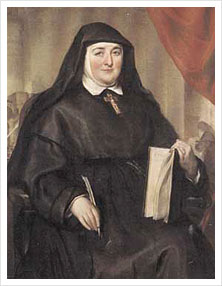
Mother Mary Aikenhead, founder of the Sisters of Charity.

The Sisters of Charity of Australia, or the Congregation of the Religious Sisters of Charity of Australia, is a congregation of religious sisters in the Catholic Church established in 1838. Sisters use the post-nominal initials of RSC.

== History ==
Mother Mary Aikenhead was requested by John Bede Polding OS., the first Catholic bishop in Australia, to send some sisters to help the many female convicts who had been transported to Australia as penalty for their crimes.

Arriving in New South Wales, on the Francis Spaight on 31 December 1838, the five volunteer Sisters were the first Religious Sisters to set foot on the Australian continent. They were led by Mother Mary John Cahill. The other sisters were Mary Lawrence Cater, Mary Baptist De Lacy, Mary Frances de Sales O'Brien and Mary Xavier Williams, who was a novice.

The Sisters of Charity of Australia have operated independently of the congregation in Ireland since 1842. St Vincent's Hospital, Sydney, was founded by the Sisters in 1857. In 1925, the Sisters of Charity ventured to Queensland, Australia, to open a school, Mt St Michael's College — originally known as Grantuly until 1941 — in Ashgrove.

The spirituality of the Sisters of Charity derives from the life of St. Vincent de Paul and the vision of Mary Aikenhead, their foundress. In addition to the three vows of poverty, chastity and obedience, the Sisters of Charity take a fourth vow of service to the poor. For the Sisters of Charity, "Service of the Poor" denotes not only the alleviation of a present affliction by immediate action, but also includes having a "preferential option for the poor".

== Services ==
The ministries of the Sisters of Charity of Australia have been varied in nature from the time of their founding. From ministering in prisons to managing hospitals and acting to conserve environments, they have been quick to "read the signs of the times" and move to where they have been most needed, in the greatest service to the poor. One of their most prominent ministries was the establishment of St Vincent's Hospital, Sydney in 1857. St Vincent's Hospital, Melbourne was opened in 1893.

In 2009, the stewardship of St Vincent's Health Australia was passed to Mary Aikenhead Ministries, a newly founded arm operating under the Australian division of the Sisters of Charity.

In 1957, the Sisters opened Mt Olivet Hospital as a hospice in Brisbane. It now provides a wider range of hospital services and has been renamed St Vincent's Private Hospital.

Under the stewardship of Mary Aikenhead Ministries, St Vincent’s Health Australia started their first aged care facility in 1977 at Kangaroo Point under the banner of St Vincent’s Care Services. This has since expanded to 23 aged care homes as well as retirement living and in home care services across Queensland, New South Wales and Victoria.

== Heritage Centre and Archives ==
In June 2019, the Sisters of Charity of Australia opened their Heritage Centre and Archives in Potts Point, Sydney, adjacent to St Vincent's Ladies' College, the Congregational Chapel, and the original site of St Vincent's Private Hospital Sydney. The Centre houses an exhibition space which tells the story of the Sisters of Charity since their arrival in 1838, as well as the archives and meeting spaces.

== Schools ==
The following is a timeline of the schools which were either founded or at which the Sisters had a foundational or otherwise significant impact on the school. This timeline was authored by Danielle Achikian in her book Ministry of Love: The story of the Sister of Charity.

=== New South Wales ===
1858 St Vincent's Primary School, Potts Point

1871 St Vincent's High School, Potts Point

1882 amalgamated to become St Vincent's College

1879 All Saints Catholic College, Liverpool

1882 St Mary's Primary School, Liverpool

1920 primary and high schools amalgamate to become an intermediate school

1950 primary and high schools separate

1881 Bethlehem College, Ashfield

1882 St Charles Primary School, Ashfield later renamed St Vincent's Primary School

1883 St Mary's Primary School, Concord

1883 Sacred Heart Primary School, Darlinghurst

1883 St Mary's Cathedral School, Sydney

1883 St Thomas Becket Primary School, Lewisham

1883 St Francis' Primary School, Paddington

1884 Nazaretto School, Bega

1885 All Saints' Primary School. Bombala

1885 All Saints High School, Bombala

1886 St Michael's Parish School. Hurstville later renamed St Mary's Star of the Sea Primary School

1888 St Anne's Orphanage School, Liverpool

1892 St Canice's Primary School, Elizabeth Bay

1892 St John's Primary School, Auburn

1892 St Joseph's School, Rockdale

1893 St John's Girls High School, Auburn

1895 St Mary's Star of the Sea High School, Hurstville

1895 St Patrick's Primary School, Mortlake

1901 St Canice's Primary School, Katoomba

1901 Mt St Mary's School, Katoomba later renamed Mt St Mary's Ladies College

1903 Mt St Patrick's High School. Paddington

1907 St Declan's Primary School, Penshurst

1912 Convent Infants, Primary and High School become Monte Oliveto College. Edgecliff

1913 St Thomas High School, Lewisham

1924 St Ambrose's Primary School, Concord West

1926 St Mary's Cathedral Commercial College, Sydney

1929 St Raphael's Church School, South Hurstville

1935 Sacred Heart Primary School, Cabramatta

1939 St Thomas More's Catholic Primary School, Brighton-Le-Sands

1939 St Gabriel's Primary School, Bexley

1952 St Peter's Primary School, Mt Pritchard later renamed Our Lady Or

1952 Mt Carmel Primary School

1958 Stella Maris Primary School Shellharbour

1964 St Joseph the Worker School, Auburn South

1982 Marion Primary School, Horsley Park

2000 Nazareth Catholic Primary School, Blackbutt

=== Tasmania ===
1847 St Joseph's School, Hobart (primary and secondary)

1924 St Joseph's Secondary School (also known as St Joseph's College)

1957 Secondary classes transferred to Mt Carmel College, Sandy Bay

1869 St Luke's Ragged School, South Hobart

1879 St Joseph’s Orphanage School, Hobart

1926 St Brigid's Catholic School, New Norfolk

1942 Mt Carmel Primary School, Sandy Bay later renamed Mt Carmel College

1960 St Aloysius Primary School, Kingston

1965 St Francis Xavier's Primary School, South Hobart

=== Victoria ===
1889 St Patrick's Primary School, Fitzroy, later renamed St Patrick's Cathedral Convent School

1890 St John's Primary School, East Melbourne

1891 St Joseph's Primary School, Collingwood

1894 St John the Baptist, Clifton Hill (primary and secondary)

1896 St Monica's School, Essendon

1897 St Patrick's Cathedral Convent School, Fitzroy demolished and relocated to East Melbourne

1902 Catholic Ladies College, East Melbourne later relocated to Eltham

1897 St Columba's College, Essendon (primary and secondary)

1897 St George's Primary School, Carlton

1923 St Therese's Primary School, Essendon

1931 St Philomena's Scholarship School, Moonee Ponds

1937 St Vincent de Paul Primary School, Essendon North (parish later renamed Strathmore)

1955 St John Bosco's Primary School, East Keilor

1955 Corpus Christi Primary School, Glenroy

1961 St Francis de Sales Primary School, Oak Park

1962 St Christopher's Primary School, Airport West

1967 Sancta Sophia College, Glenroy

1971 Our Lady Help of Christians Primary School, Eltham

1971 Sacred Heart Primary School, Diamond Creek

1974 St Leo the Great Primary School, Altona North

1983 St Charles Borromeo Catholic Primary School, Templestowe

=== Queensland ===
1925 St Finbarr's Primary School, Ashgrove

1928 St Finbarr's Secondary College, Ashgrove (also referred to as Grantuly College) later renamed Mt St Michael's College

1929 St Mary's College, Kingaroy

1951 Mater Dei Catholic Primary School, St John's Wood

1972 St Peter Chanel's Primary School, The Gap

1955 Notre Dame Primary School, Coorparoo

=== Australian Capital Territory ===
1966 Holy Trinity Primary School, Curtin

== Hospitals and health care services ==
- 1996: The Sisters of Charity Health Service established
- 2009: Mary Aikenhead Ministries established

=== New South Wales ===
1857 St Vincent's Hospital, Tarmons, Potts Point

1870 relocated to Darlinghurst site

1882 School of Nursing established

1886 St Joseph's Consumptive Hospital, Parramatta

1890 Sacred Heart Hospice for the Dying, Darlinghurst

1988 Sacred Heart Hospice for the Dying, Darlinghurst - new building

1892 St Joseph's Hospital, Auburn

1908 Casualty Department established at St Vincent's Hospital Sydney

1909 St Vincent's Private Hospital Sydney

1977 St Vincent's Private Hospital Sydney - new building

1920 first Orthopaedic Department in Australia established at St Vincent's Hospital Sydney

1921 St Vincent's Hospital Lismore

1922 St Vincent's Hospital Bathurst

1923 St Vincent's Hospital Sydney approved by the Senate of the University of Sydney as a teaching hospital and clinical school

1925 Sacred Heart Hospital, Cootamundra

1937 St Joseph's Hospice, Lismore

1937 Almoners (Social Work) Department established at St Vincent's Hospital Sydney

1945 Physiotherapy Department established at St Vincent's Hospital Sydney

1945 Department of Experimental Medicine established at St Vincent's Hospital Sydney

1949 Department of Neurosurgery established at St Vincent's Hospital Sydney

1952 Cardiovascular Unit established at St Vincent's Hospital Sydney

1961 Babworth House, Darling Point established as a convalescent annexe of St Vincent's Hospital Sydney

1962 Caritas Psychiatric Centre, Sydney established as a psychiatric day centre and later became an inpatient psychiatric service

1962 Rheumatology Department established at St Vincent's Hospital Sydney

1963 The Garvan Institute of Medical Research, Sydney

1984 incorporated as an autonomous., non-profit institute under the Garvan Institute of Medical Research Ad

1966 St Brigid's Infirmary, Potts Point

1981 named St Brigid's Nursing Home

1967 Coronary Care Unit established at St Vincent's Hospital Sydney

1981 Diabetic Day Care Centre established at St Vincent's Hospital Sydney

1982 Gorman House, Detoxification Unit, Sydney

1984 Rankin Court Alcohol and Drug Service

1983 Centre for Immunology. Sydney

2008 becomes part of St Vincent's Centre for Applied Medical Research

1989 The Centre for or Immunology established at St Vincent's Hospital Sydney

1990 St Vincent's Clinic

1991 Tarmons, St Joseph's Village and Sr. Maria Cunningham Centre Auburn

1994 Victor Chang Cardiac Research Unit, Sydney

2001 rehabilitation Unit established at St Vincent's Hospital Sydney

2001 Mater Hospital North Sydney is acquired from the Sisters of Mercy, North Sydney and merged with St Vincent's Hospital Sydney, Darlinghurst campus

2002 Xavier Building opens at St Vincent's Hospital Sydney providing 360 new beds

2003 Stroke Unit established at St Vincent's Hospital Sydney

2008 Lowy Packer Building opens as St Vincent's Centre for Applied Medical Research

2008 Cunningham Centre established for research and clinical practice into palliative care

2016 St Vincent's Care Services Aged Care Bronte

2019 St Vincent's Care Services Aged Care Yennora

2019 St Vincent's Care Services Aged Care Haberfield

=== Victoria ===
1893 St Vincent's Hospital, Fitzroy

1906 St Evin's Private Hospital, Fitzroy

1915 renamed Mt St Evin's Private Hospital

1968 demolished and new St Vincent's Private Hospital built on site

1910 St Vincent's Hospital Clinical School established. It is the first school to have a formal agreement with the University of Melbourne regarding the appointment of teaching staff

1937 St Vincent's Maternity Hospital, Melbourne

1972 merged with St Vincent's Private Hospital Melbourne

1938 Caritas Christi Hospice, Kew

1958 St Vincent's School of Medical Research, Melbourne

1984 St Vincent's at Home at St Vincent's Hospital Melbourne

1984 renamed St Vincent's Institute of Medical Research

1959 Home Care Extension Service established and later renamed

1960 Aikenhead Nurses Home and Daly Wing at St Vincent's Hospital Melbourne

1961 Intensive Care Unit established at St Vincent’s Hospital Melbourne the first in Australia

1964 Australia's first clinic for the care of alcoholics and the study of alcohol established at St Vincent's Hospital Melbourne

1970 The O’Brien Institute

1972 St Vincent's Private Hospital Melbourne

1998 merged with Mercy Private Hospital to form St Vincent's & Mercy Private Hospital

2008 Acquisition of Vimy Private Hospital. All three facilities merged to become known as St Vincent's Private Hospital Melbourne

1976 Microsurgery Research Unit established at St Vincent's Hospital Melbourne

1976 Prague House, Kew established offering residential health services for homeless people

1979 St Augustine's Ward established at St Vincent's Hospital Melbourne provide inpatient health services for prison inmates

1988 de Paul House, Fitzroy opens as a detoxification unit

1997 Briar Terrace support service opened in Fitzroy (closed in 2024)

2001 St George's Health Service Kew transferred by the State Government to be part of St Vincent's Hospital Melbourne

2006 St Vincent's Clinical Education and Simulation Centre established at St Vincent's Hospital Melbourne

2017 St Vincent's Care Services Aged Care Werribee

2021 St Vincent's Care Services Aged Care Kew

=== Queensland ===
1922 St Vincent's Private Hospital Toowoomba

1952 St Vincent's Maternity Hospital Toowoomba

1957 Mt Olivet Hospital, Kangaroo Point

1977 Marycrest Retirement Centre/Lilian Cooper Nursing Home Kangaroo Point

1987 Villa La Salle Nursing Home Southport

2000 Acquisition of aged care services in Queensland: St Paul's Villa; Magdalene Court; St Patrick's Villa; St John the Baptist Retirement Community; Oxford Park Retirement Community; St Joseph's Villa Hostel; Madonna Villa Nursing Home

2000 St Vincent's Hospital Robina

2002 transferred operations to Queensland Health

2001 The Holy Spirit Northside Private Hospital, Chermside established as a partnership with the Holy Spirit Sisters

2002 Intensive Care Unit established at St Vincent's Private Hospital Toowoomba, the first private unit in Australia

2006 Lourdes Home for the Aged Toowoomba (Purchased)

2007 St Vincent's Care Services Aged Care Maroochydore

2019 St Vincent's Care Services Aged Care Carseldine (aka Holy Spirit Home) (Purchased)

2019 St Vincent's Care Services Aged Care Boondall (aka Holy Spirit Home) (Purchased)

=== Tasmania ===
1944 acquired St Margaret's Hospital and renamed it St Vincent's Hospital Launceston

2005 ownership transferred to Calvary Health Care

== Notable members ==
- Mary Catherine Bruton (Mother Canice)
- Anne Daly
- Mary Healy (Mother Gertrude)
- Brigid McGuigan
- Ellen O'Doherty
- Mary Dunstan Wilson
