= Mary Aikenhead =

Catholic institute and hospital founder

Mother Mary Frances
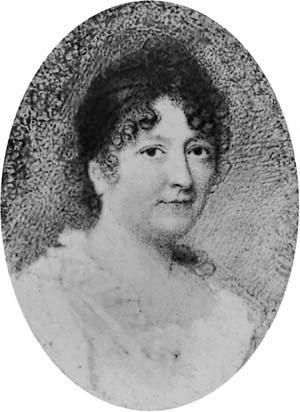
- Mary Aikenhead (ca. 1807)
- Born: 19 January 1787; Daunt's Square, Cork, Ireland
- Died: 22 July 1858 (aged 71); Our Lady's Mount, Harolds Cross, Dublin, Ireland
- Resting place: St. Mary Magdalen's, Donnybrook, Dublin, Ireland
- Known for: The founder of the Religious Sisters of Charity
- Parent: David Aikenhead; Mary Stacpole

Mother Mary Frances Aikenhead (19 January 1787 – 22 July 1858) was born in Daunt's Square off Grand Parade, Cork, Ireland. Described as one of nursing's greatest leaders, she was the founder of the Catholic religious institute, the Religious Sisters of Charity, the Sisters of Charity of Australia, and of St. Vincent's Hospital in Dublin.

== Biography ==
The daughter of David Aikenhead, a physician, member of the Anglican Church of Ireland, and Mary Stacpole, a Roman Catholic. Her grandfather, also named David Aikenhead, was a Scottish gentleman who relinquished his military profession, married a Limerick lady, Miss Anne Wight and settled in Cork. Mary was baptised in the Anglican Communion on 4 April 1787. Mary was quite frail and probably considered to be asthmatic and it was recommended that she be fostered by a nanny called Mary Rourke who lived on higher ground on Eason's Hill, Shandon, Cork. It is thought that Mary was secretly baptised a Catholic from this early age by Mary Rourke who was a devout Catholic. Her parents would visit every week until 1793 when her father decided he wanted her to rejoin the family in Daunt's Square. The Rourkes also joined the family and worked as servants to the family.

By the early 1790s Dr. Aikenhead had become interested in the principles of the United Irishmen. On one occasion Lord Edward Fitzgerald disguised as a Quaker sought refuge in the Aikenhead home. He was enjoying dinner with the family when the house was surrounded by troops with the sheriff at their head. The visitor managed to disappear and reach safety across the river. The house was searched but because of the loyalty of his apprentices who knew and kept the doctor's secret, no incriminating documents were found.

At about the age of nine Mary began to spend a good deal of time visiting her maternal grandmother, where she was exposed to Catholic beliefs and practice through her widowed aunt, Mrs. Gorman. After her father retired, he became ill and was received into the Roman Catholic Church before dying on 15 December 1801. Six months later, at the age of fifteen, Mary was baptised a Roman Catholic on 6 June 1802.

In 1808, Mary went to stay with her friend Anna Maria (born Ball) O’Brien in Dublin whom she had met in Cork. Here she witnessed widespread unemployment and poverty and soon began to accompany her friend in visiting the poor and sick in their homes.

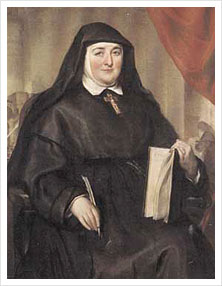
Mother Mary Augustine

She was active in works of charity but she had failed to find a religious institute devoted to charitable work. She shared this idea with Archbishop Murray, Bishop Coadjutor of Dublin who was a friend of O'Brien. Murray returned later and said that he would bring a French order to Ireland if Aikenhead would lead it. To prepare for this task she became a novice from 1812 to 1815 in the Convent of the Institute of the Blessed Virgin at Micklegate Bar, York. She there assumed the name she kept until death, Sister Mary Augustine, though always known to the world as "Mrs. Aikenhead". `

On 1 September 1815, the first members of the new institute took their vows, Sister Mary Augustine being appointed Superior-General. Added to the traditional three vows of poverty, chastity and obedience, was a fourth vow: to devote their lives to the service of the poor.

At the time that Aikenhead established her congregation, there were only a hundred women in religious orders in Ireland, all enclosed contemplatives.

The next sixteen years were filled with the arduous work of organizing the community and extending its sphere of labour to every phase of charity, chiefly hospital and rescue work. She and her sisters were the first women religious to visit prisoners in Kilmainham Gaol.

In 1831 overexertion and disease shattered Aikenhead's health, leaving her an invalid. Her activity was unceasing, however, and she directed her sisters in their heroic work during the plague of 1832, placed them in charge of new institutions, and sent them on missions to France and in 1835 to Australia.

On 23 January 1834 Archbishop Daniel Murray and Mother Aikenhead founded St. Vincent's Hospital.

She died in Dublin, aged 71, having left her institute in a flourishing condition, in charge of ten institutions, besides innumerable missions and branches of charitable work. She is interred in the cemetery attached to St. Mary Magdalen's, Donnybrook.

== Cause for canonisation ==
Aikenhead's spiritual writings were approved by theologians on 8 May 1918. Her cause was formally opened on 20 March 1921, granting her the title of Servant of God. On 18 March 2015, a decree was issued proclaiming her heroic virtues. This entitles her to be referred to as the Venerable Mary Aikenhead.

The Mary Aikenhead Heritage Centre details Mary's life and the Religious Sisters of Charity. It is in Dublin at Our Lady's Hospice, Harolds Cross in the building called Our Lady's Mount. This is where Mary Aikenhead spent the remainder of her life. The building was later used to establish Our Lady's Hospice in 1879.

== Legacy ==
St. Margaret's Hospice was founded in 1950. It is now called St. Margaret of Scotland Hospice.

== See also ==
- List of people on the postage stamps of Ireland
