= Colin Gilray =

NZ & Scotland international rugby union player and British army officer

Colin Gilray OBE MC
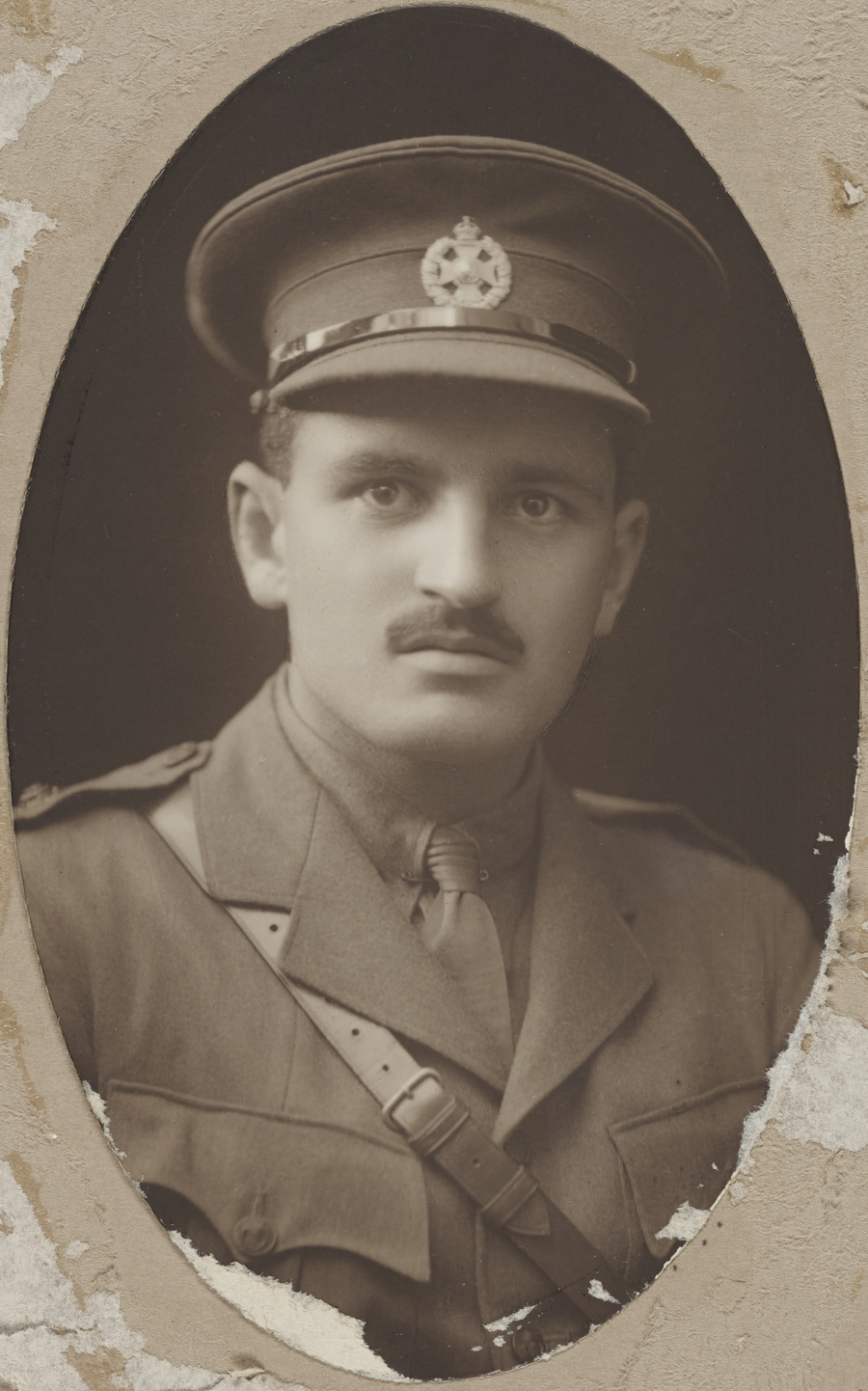

2nd Principal of John McGlashan College
- In office 1922–1934
- Preceded by: Arthur Gordon Butchers
- Succeeded by: Robert George Colin McNab

4th Principal of Scotch College, Melbourne
- In office 1934–1953
- Preceded by: William Still Littlejohn
- Succeeded by: Richard Selby Smith

Deputy chancellor, University of Melbourne
- In office 15 March 1954 – 11 March 1958
- Preceded by: Arthur Dean
- Succeeded by: Ian Clunies Ross
- In office 2 March 1959 – 4 March 1962
- Preceded by: Ian Clunies Ross
- Succeeded by: William George Dismore Upjohn

Personal details
- Born: Colin Macdonald Gilray; 17 March 1885 Broughty Ferry, Scotland
- Died: 15 July 1974 (aged 89) East Melbourne, Victoria, Australia
- Spouse: Ethel Muriel Standish (m. 1917; died 1968)
- Relatives: Thomas Gilray (father); Arthur Standish (father-in-law)
- Education: Otago Boys' High School
- Alma mater: University of Otago; University of Oxford

Military service
- Allegiance: United Kingdom
- Branch/service: British Army
- Years of service: 1916–1919
- Rank: Captain
- Unit: Rifle Brigade (Prince Consort's Own)
- Battles/wars: World War I
- Awards: Military Cross (1918)
- Height: 1.78 m (5 ft 10 in)
- Weight: 76 kg (168 lb)

Rugby union career
- Position: Wing three-quarter
Amateur team(s)
| Years | Team | Apps | (Points) |
| 1904–07 | Otago University | | |
| – | London Scottish | | |
Provincial / State sides
| Years | Team | Apps | (Points) |
| 1904–06 | Otago | | |
International career
| Years | Team | Apps | (Points) |
| 1905 | New Zealand | 1 | (0) |
| 1908–12 | Scotland | 4 | (3) |

Colin Macdonald Gilray OBE MC (17 March 1885 – 15 July 1974) was a Scottish-born rugby union player, soldier and educationalist. He represented both New Zealand and Scotland in rugby union and won the Military Cross during World War I as a captain in the British Rifle Brigade. A Rhodes Scholar, he became headmaster of both John McGlashan College in Dunedin, New Zealand, and Scotch College, Melbourne, and served as deputy chancellor of the University of Melbourne on two separate occasions.

== Early life and family ==
Born at Broughty Ferry, Scotland, on 17 March 1885, Gilray was the fourth child of Annie Gilray (née Macdonald) and her husband, Thomas Gilray, at the time professor of English language and literature at University College, Dundee. The family moved to Dunedin, New Zealand, in 1890 after Thomas Gilray was appointed professor of English language and literature at the University of Otago in 1889.

Gilray was educated at Otago Boys' High School, and went on to the University of Otago, where he was president of the student union. He graduated in 1907 with a Bachelor of Arts in English and German (first-class honours) and classics (second-class honours). Awarded a Rhodes Scholarship in 1907, Gilray went to University College, Oxford, graduating Master of Arts with second-class honours in 1910. Between 1910 and 1913 he taught at Mill Hill School, London. He was called to the bar at the Middle Temple in 1913 and then returned to New Zealand, practising law at Milton.

On 24 November 1917, Gilray married Ethel Muriel Standish at Haslemere, Surrey, England. Ethel was the daughter of Arthur Standish, the first mayor of New Plymouth. She was in England as a nurse at the No. 2 New Zealand General Hospital in Walton-on-Thames, where New Zealand troops were hospitalised, and was particularly noted for her massage work. The couple went on to have one daughter.

== Rugby union ==
A wing three-quarter, Gilray played for the Otago University club during his undergraduate studies. He made his provincial debut for Otago in 1904, and also played for the South Island in the inter-island fixture that year. In 1905 he declined a place on The Original All Blacks tour of the British Isles, France and the United States, but he did play for New Zealand against the touring Australian side in their single Test match, at Tahuna Park, Dunedin, on 2 September 1905. The 14–3 victory by New Zealand was to be Gilray's only appearance for the national team. He continued to play for Otago through the 1906 season.

After taking up his Rhodes Scholarship, Gilray played rugby for Oxford University and London Scottish. He made his debut for Scotland on 21 March 1908 in the 1908 Home Nations Championship, against England at Inverleith, with Scotland winning the match by 16 points to 10. He was awarded an Oxford Blue later that year. In the 1909 Home Nations Championship, Gilray made two appearances for Scotland, against Wales and England. In the latter game he scored his only try for Scotland. He made a further appearance for Scotland, in the 1912 Five Nations Championship against Ireland. Gilray also captained London Scottish.

Back in New Zealand in 1914, Gilray made one final appearance as an injury replacement for the Otago University team during the local club competition final.

== Military service ==
Gilray enlisted in the British Army in early 1916, and was commissioned as a second lieutenant in the 13th (Service) Battalion, Rifle Brigade, in July that year. He was wounded on 13 November 1916 during the latter stages of the Battle of the Somme. Promoted to captain, he was invalided back to England in September 1917. He was awarded the Military Cross, gazetted on 1 January 1918. For the remainder of the war, Gilray trained officer cadets at Aldershot. From 1921 until 1935, when he was transferred to the retired list, Gilray was a captain in the 2nd Battalion Otago Regiment, New Zealand Territorial Force.

== Teaching career ==
Gilray returned to practising law in Milton in 1919. However, in 1922 he was appointed principal of John McGlashan College in Dunedin, succeeding Arthur Gordon Butchers. During his tenure, Gilray developed music and science at the school, and raised academic standards. While visiting Queenstown in September 1931, Gilray sustained a fracture dislocation of his left ankle when it was run over by the car that he was pushing in an attempt to make it start. He was left with one leg shorter than the other.

Gilray was elected to the University of Otago Council in 1925, and the Council of the University of New Zealand in 1927. In 1933 he declined nomination as vice-chancellor of the University of Otago.

In 1934, after 12 years at John McGlashan, Gilray took up the post of principal of Scotch College, Melbourne, following the death of the incumbent, William Still Littlejohn. With 1500 pupils at Scotch College compared to about 200 at John McGlashan, Gilray found that he was fully occupied by administrative tasks, although he occasionally still found time to teach English or religious studies. Under his leadership the school developed its art, theatre and music programmes, and he resisted higher student fees.

Gilray was a member of the standing committee of the Headmasters' Conference of the Independent Schools of Australia (HCISA) from 1939 to 1952, and served as its chairman between 1949 and 1952. He retired as principal of Scotch College at the end of April 1953.

In the Australian 1951 New Year Honours Gilray was appointed an Officer of the Order of the British Empire (OBE) in recognition of his services as principal of Scotch College. His brother, Thomas Gilray, was also appointed an OBE in the New Zealand 1951 New Year Honours, for services as a medical practitioner.

== Later life and death ==
Following his retirement from Scotch College, Gilray continued as executive officer of the HCISA for 10 years. He served as deputy chancellor of the University of Melbourne from 1954 to 1958 and 1959 to 1962. The University of Melbourne conferred an honorary degree of Doctor of Laws on Gilray in 1956.

Between 1961 and 1965 Gilray was a member of the Committee on the Future Development of Tertiary Education in Australia, chaired by Sir Leslie Martin, which led to a formalised ‘binary divide’ between the universities, as research and teaching institutions, and other higher education teaching institutions.

Ethel Gilray died in 1968. Colin Macdonald Gilray died in East Melbourne on 15 July 1974, and he was buried with his wife at Box Hill Cemetery.
