= Gilray =

Gilray is a Scottish surname. Notable people with the surname include:

- Colin Gilray (1885–1974), Scottish-born rugby union player, soldier and educationalist
- James Gillray (1879–1964), English caricaturist and printmaker
