= William Upjohn =

William Upjohn may refer to:

- William E. Upjohn (1853–1932), American doctor
- William George Dismore Upjohn (1888–1979), Australian surgeon
