= Malvern Presbyterian Church =

Malvern Presbyterian Church, Melbourne
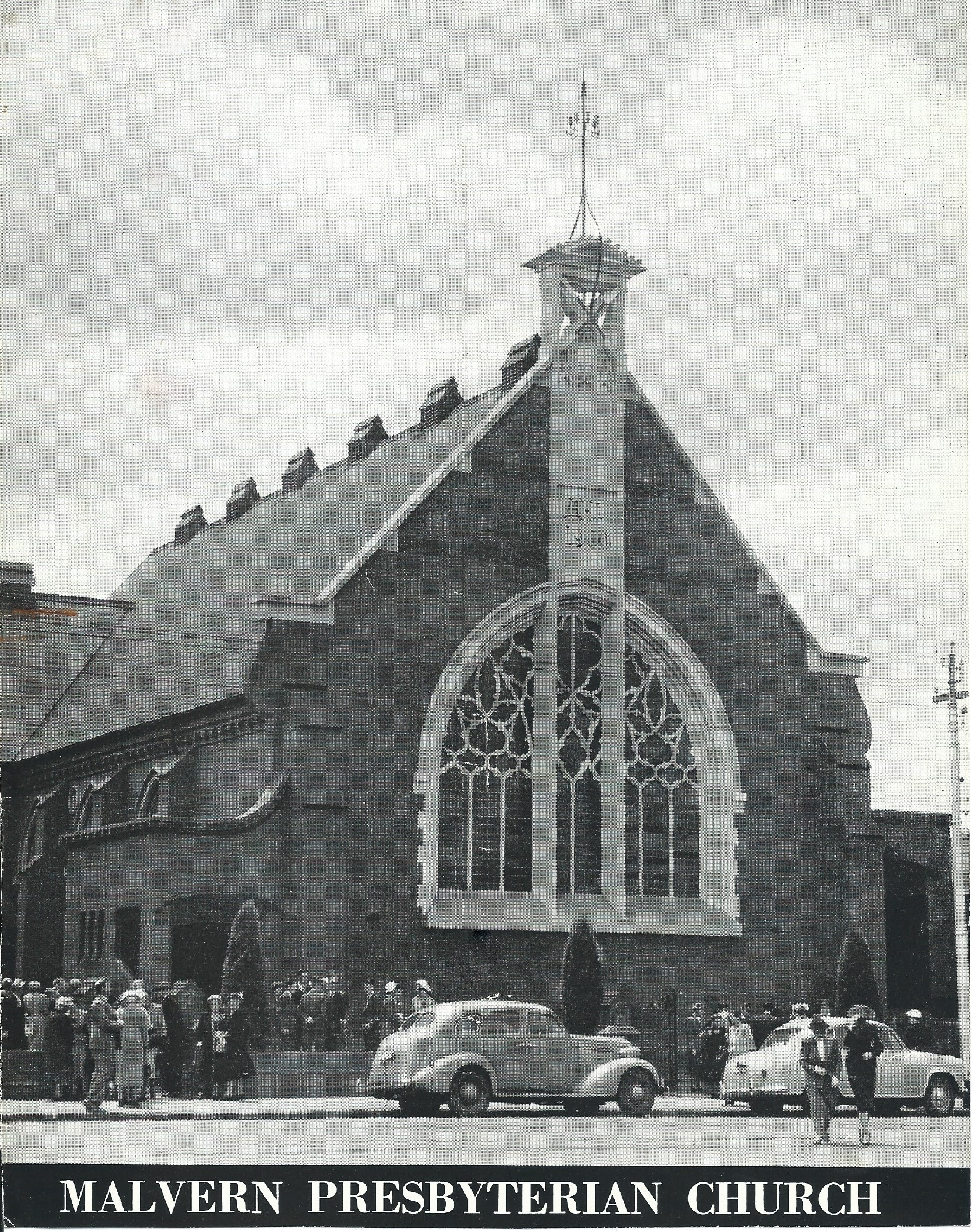
- Malvern Presbyterian Church in 1955
- Malvern Presbyterian Church, Melbourne
- 37°51′45″S 145°01′52″E
- Location: Malvern, Victoria
- Country: Australia
- Denomination: Presbyterian
- Website: www.malvernpc.org

History
- Founded: 1886
- Founder: Rev. W. Lockhart Morton
- Dedicated: 27 July 1906

Architecture
- Architect: Robert Joseph Haddon
- Style: Federation Arts and Craft with Art Nouveau influences
- Completed: 1906

Specifications
- Capacity: 520 people

Administration
- Division: Victoria

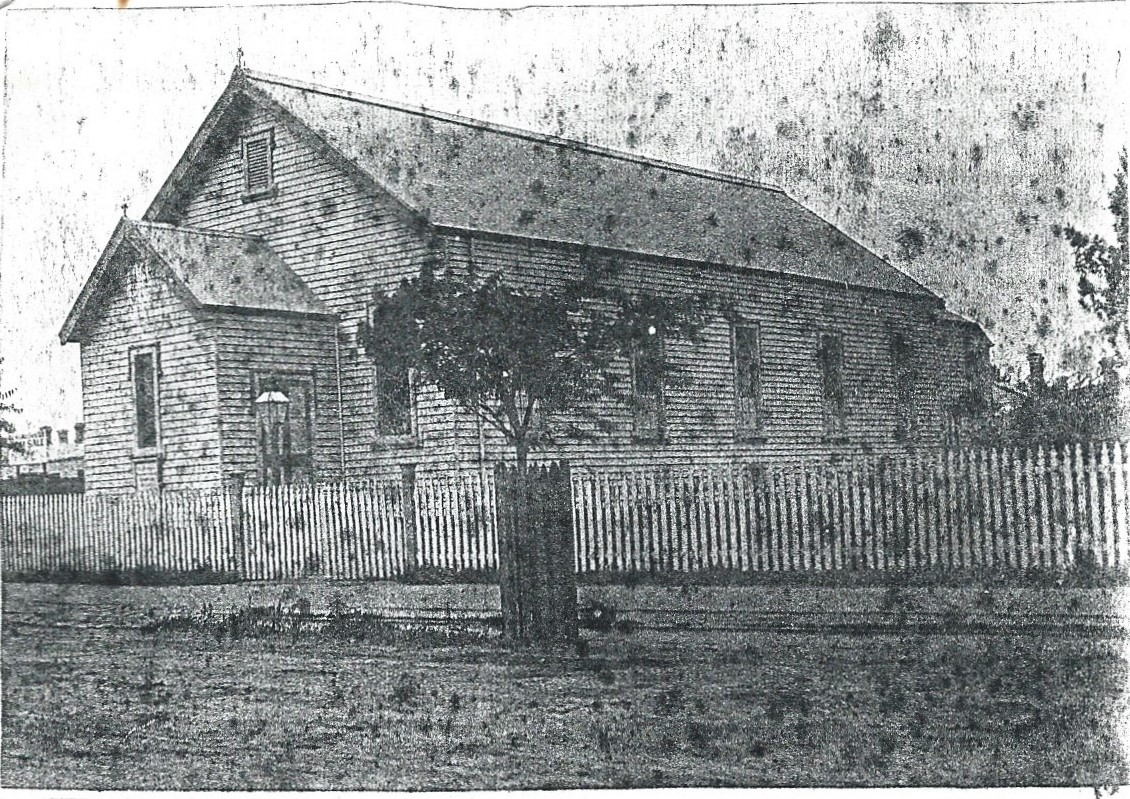
Original Malvern Presbyterian Church at what is now numbered 108–114 Glenferrie Road

Malvern Presbyterian Church is located in Victoria, Australia. Opened in 1886, it was the first Presbyterian Church to be founded in the City of Malvern and is now within Stonnington, a metropolitan area of Melbourne.

The church is a congregation of the Presbyterian Church of Australia. A good example of Post-Federation, Australian Arts & Crafts architecture, it is in stylistic sympathy with the many Federation style houses in the area. The church became a hub of the district and the place of worship for many leading citizens of the area and reflected the self-confidence of Edwardian Melbourne. The Congregation produced three Moderators of the General Assembly of the Presbyterian Church of Victoria and continues to thrive as a diverse congregation in a busy inner-east suburb.

== Background ==
Malvern is one of several daughter churches formed by families from the Toorak congregation. Originally, the area was called the Gardiner Road district and developed from the 1860s as a place for wealthy Melburnians to establish large houses in a semi-rural environment. Commenting on this in 1925, the Rev Graham Balfour – who grew up in Toorak in the 1870s – described it as the "vice-regal" district, adding: "grouped around....beautiful undulating land, studded with magnificent redgum trees, were the homes, generally in wide domain, of the men who by industry, foresight and character, had attained wealth and honour in this young country. A large proportion of these were Scotch Presbyterians." The Scottish and Ulster Presbyterian influence was significant.

The closest Presbyterian congregation was a long journey to South Yarra and had been formed in 1854. A meeting was organised by two Members of Parliament who lived locally, Sir James MacBain MLA and The Hon. William Bayles MLA. This took place on 29 December 1873, with the aim to petition for the establishment of a nearby congregation, and comprised: "about 30 persons, Toorak and Malvern being about equally represented". This became the Toorak Presbyterian Church (now Toorak Uniting).

For the next decade, Malvern and Toorak were one parish, but when the South Gippsland Railway was extended from South Yarra in 1879, the opening of a station at Malvern in May of that year started to transform the southern end of Glenferrie Road. A range of commercial premises and housing developed as the population rapidly increased. Large estates were subdivided to make way for suburban plots, and orchards and horse paddocks were developed into what was becoming a fashionable locale of spacious villas. From the early 1880s, the locality's Presbyterians started to meet in homes or outdoors rather than travel through to Toorak.

=== Original church ===
By early 1886, the Presbytery of Melbourne had agreed to establish a new site at Malvern. The Toorak congregation made available a gift of £120 for three years if needed. Only £100 of this was needed and the new congregation was able to purchase a block of land for £700 at what is now numbered 108-114 Glenferrie Road 37.861689°S 145.028554°E. The wooden building was constructed and opened for worship on 10 October 1886.

== Current church ==
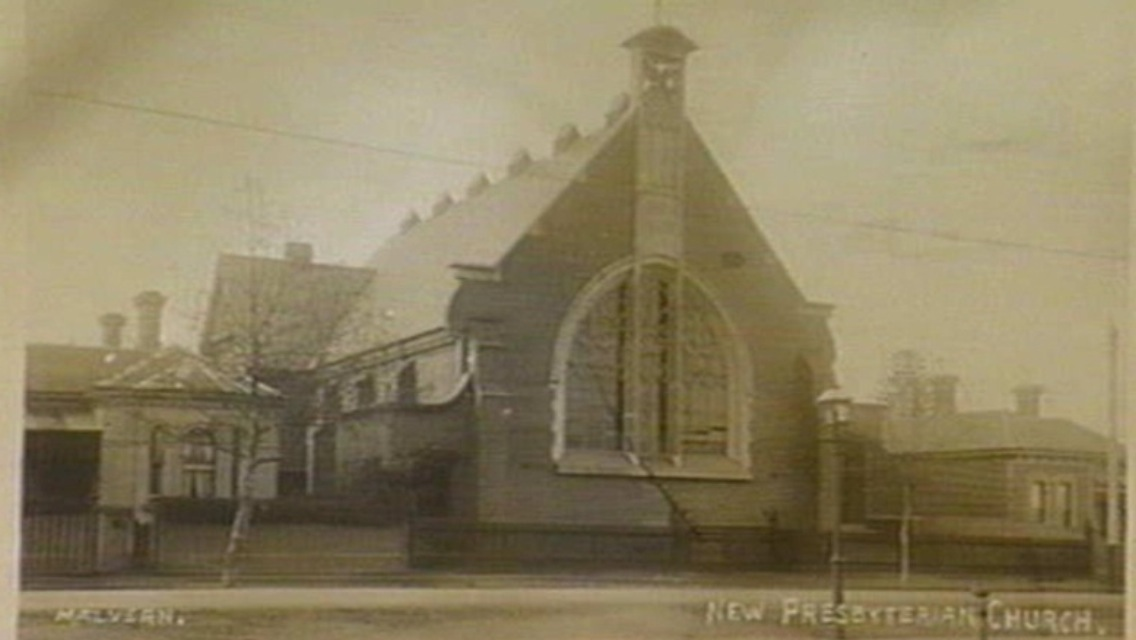
Malvern Presbyterian Church in 1906

In 1904, after almost two decades of rapid growth in both the church congregation and the locality, congregation member Robert Haddon was commissioned to design a new building on a larger plot of land at 163 Wattletree Road. As an example of Melbourne land prices between 1886 and 1904, this larger plot was again purchased for £700, but the valuable Glenferrie Road land fetched a handsome £21 per square foot. The church's foundation stone was laid by another congregation member, elder, benefactor and Mayor of the Borough of Caulfield Charles Duplan Lloyd. The old wooden structure was moved to the new site and used as a Sunday school, with the congregation using Malvern Town Hall for worship while their new structure was under construction.

When finished, the new church seated 520 and was lavishly fitted out as a "total work of art" matching the architect's stylistic philosophy. The generous commission included provision for a fine organ, which was completed by George Fincham & Sons, Richmond and stained glass by the celebrated Auguste Fischer.The Argus newspaper reported in 1905 that the cost was budgeted at £3000 and that Messers Angel & Bros of Malvern would be the contractor and John Sharpe would be responsible for the pews. In reality, the cost was £4738 plus a further £1800 for the organ.

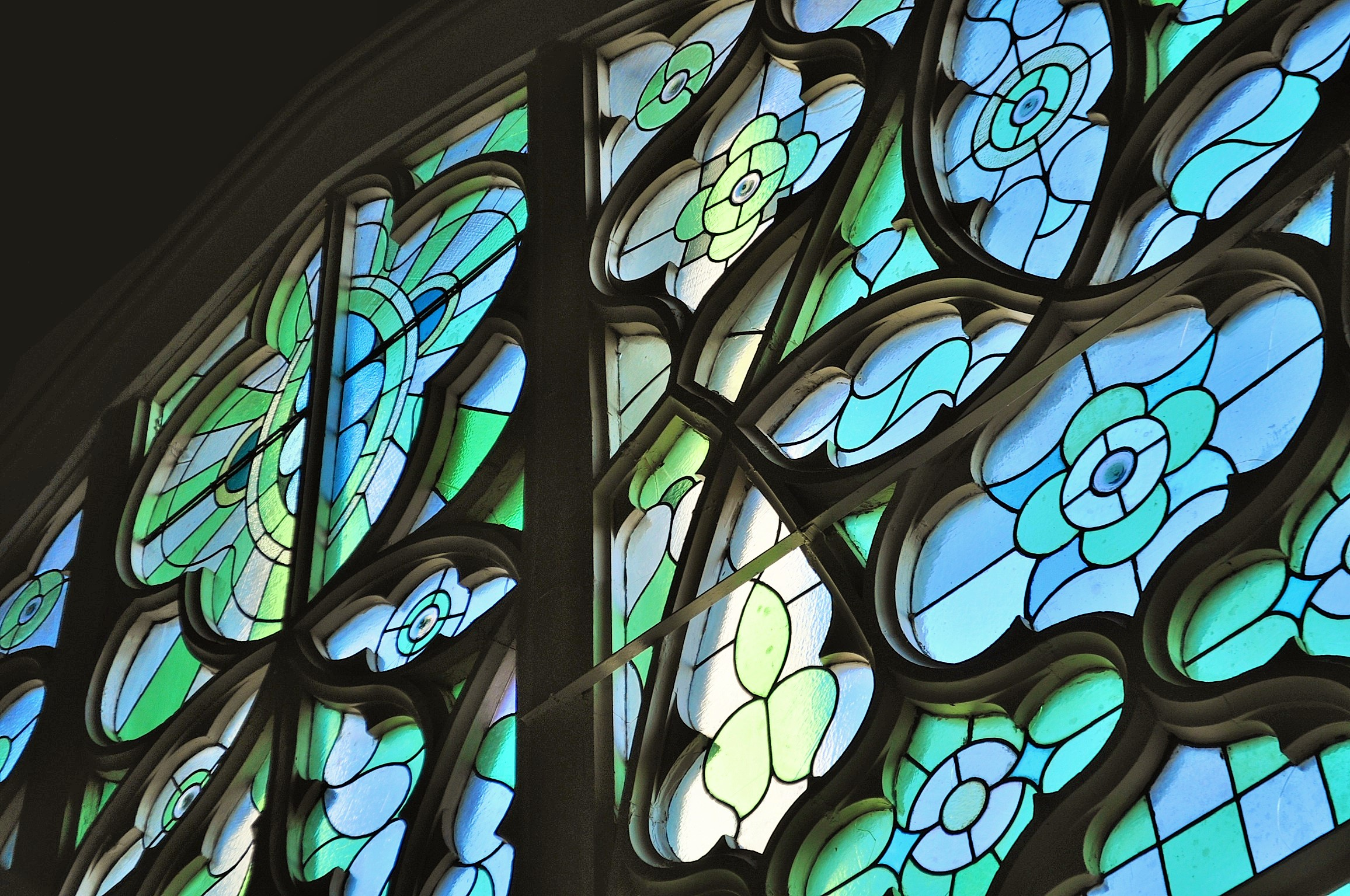
Malvern Presbyterian Church interior window tracery

The church opened on Friday 27 July 1906, and was reported in The Argus in glowing terms: "The building, which cost around £5000, presents both within and without a most attractive appearance. The pulpit and pews are harmonious with the general features of the building and the electric light has been installed. The acoustics are all that can be desired."

=== Architecture ===
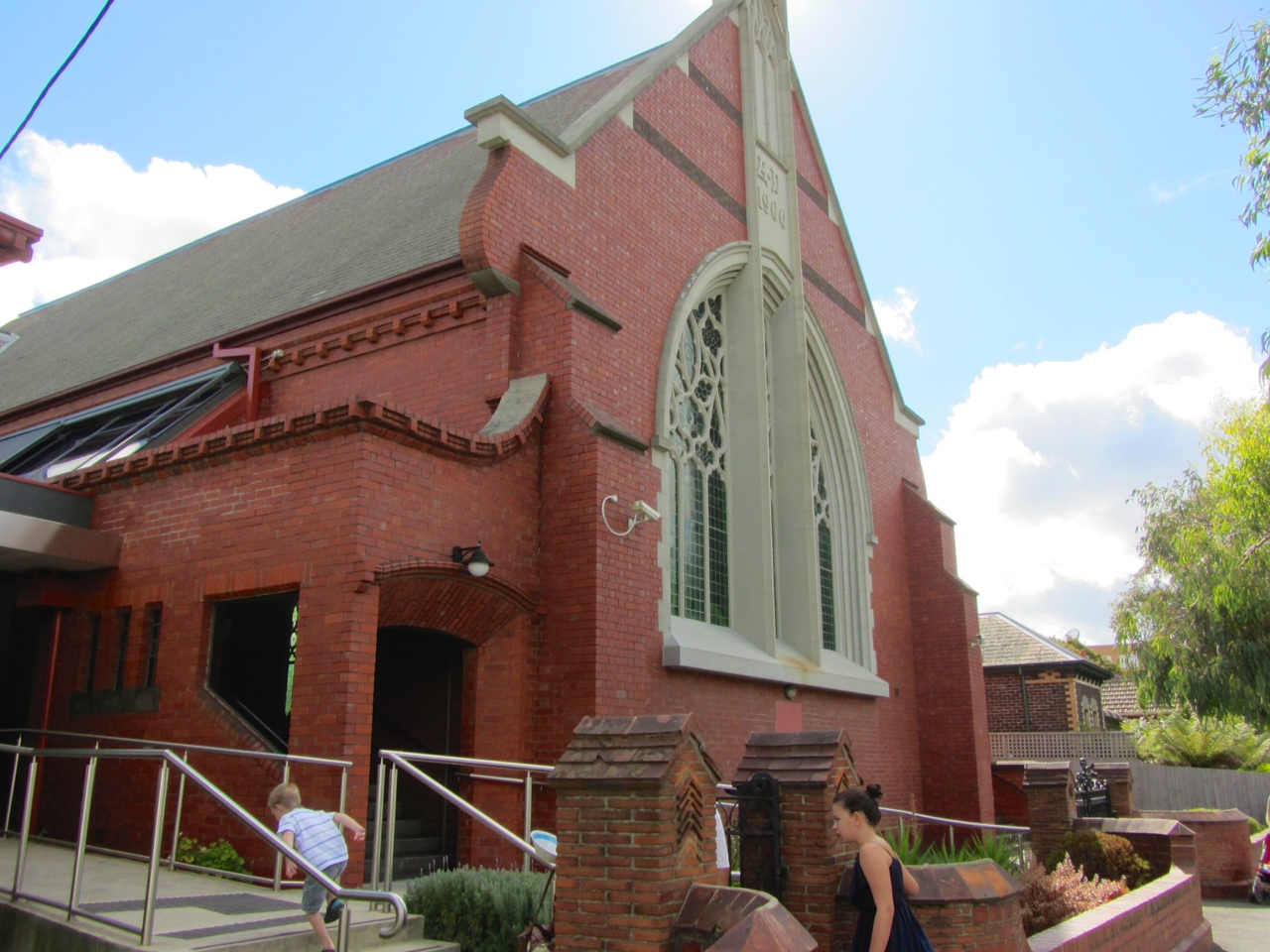
Church exterior in 2014, showing new access ramps

The church is a good example of Arts and Crafts in an Australian context. While restrained, Art Nouveau elements are also evident and include tracery in the windows and vine motifs in corbels and other ornaments. The large auditorium measures 80 ft by 42 ft with a 56 ft transept. The sloping floor allows better views while large windows fill the space with natural light. Being a shallow site, two entrance lobbies flank the front of the building to avoid using more space and a shallow apse houses the organ pipes, which abut the lane behind. A choir room and vestry is to the left and a meeting room for the kirk session to the right. While retaining traditional features, the church is in keeping with styles emerging in Europe at the time.

== Notable ministers and members ==
Rev Donald Macrae Stewart was joined Malvern in 1903. The son of a Free Church Minister from the Highlands of Scotland, he spurred the congregation on to construct the new church and served until his death in 1935. In 1915, he followed the young men of his parish to serve as an army chaplain in Egypt and then Gallipoli. In France, he served as a Chaplain Captain with the 6th Infantry AIF. in 1918, he was Moderator of the Presbyterian Church of Victoria. He had the sober honour of laying to rest some of his own flock – "our boys", as he said, "from our Sunday school". He was mentioned in despatches "for exceptional military service" for taking a communion service to completion while coming under enemy shelling.

Sir Arthur Dean, Kt, KC, Justice of the Supreme Court of Victoria, Chancellor of the University of Melbourne and chairman of Presbyterian Ladies' College, Melbourne was a long-time elder and superintendent of the Sunday school. He was made Knight Bachelor in 1960.

2nd Lt. Bruce Sloss 10th Machine Gun Company, First A.I.F, Promising VFL Footballer with Essendon and South Melbourne was a bible class teacher at Malvern. He fell at Armentières in France in 1917.

== War memorial ==
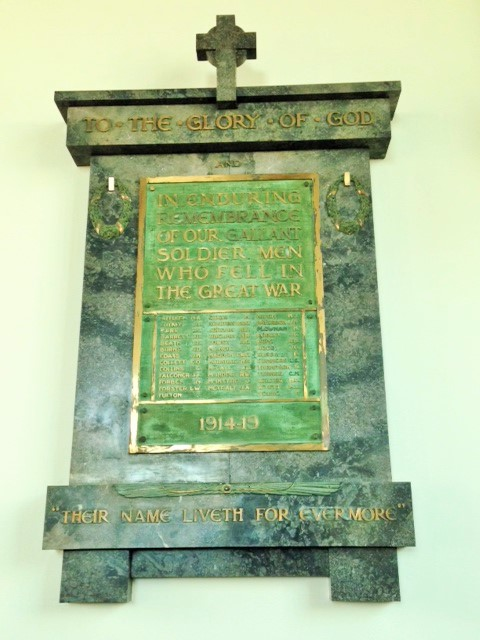
World War I memorial at Malvern Presbyterian Church

In 1921, architect Robert Haddon was again asked to assist the church and designed a war memorial to members of the congregation. The polished Buchan marble memorial has a central plate with the 38 names of the fallen. It is located in the church's north wall, to the right of the organ. An honour-board of the 217 men and women from the congregation who served is in the east porch. The Earl of Stradbroke, also Governor of Victoria, unveiled the memorial in September 1921.

== Chinese Presbyterian congregation ==
In 1984, the long-standing Chinese Presbyterian congregation from Little Bourke Street was looking for a new building and were able to settle at Malvern. A 5pm service followed by a meal was instituted in the Sunday school building to the rear of the church (the old church). For many years they met every Sunday evening, and soon became an extension of the congregation. The current 5pm service now includes many of the traditions brought by the Chinese congregation.

== Refurbishment of 2007 ==
Over the history of the congregation, various adjoining sites were acquired and used by groups. At one point a preparatory school for the Presbyterian Ladies' College was accommodated on the campus. These sites were eventually rationalised and the church refurbished. The drive between the Church building and the adjoining house – once a men's hostel and now a church hall and kitchen – was built over to form a contiguous, flexible and air-conditioned space with better catering facilities.

== Gallery ==
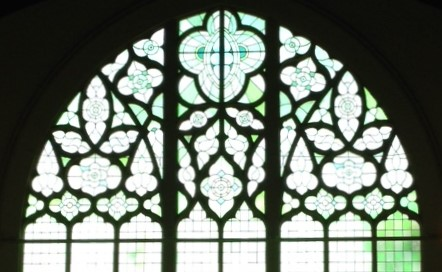
South window tracery shows Art Nouveau influence

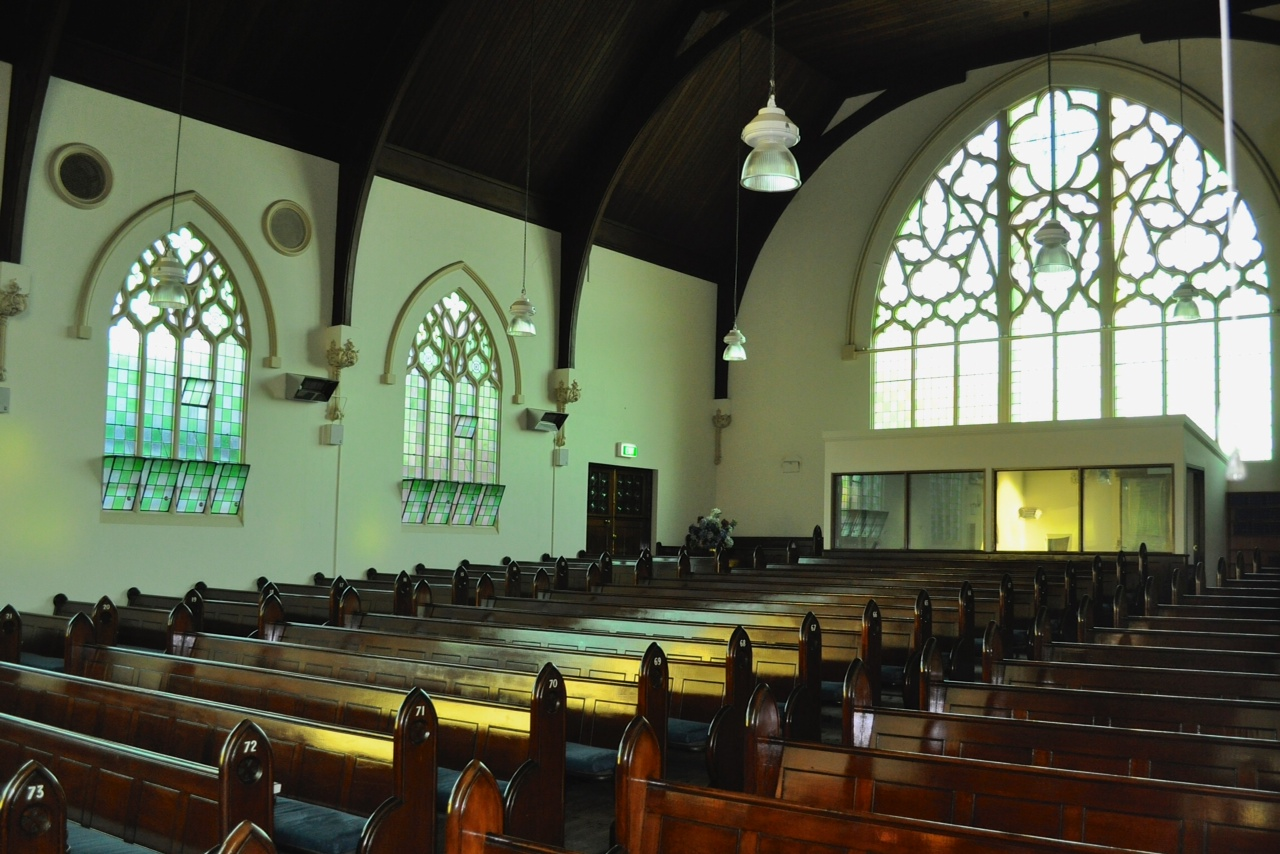
interior south

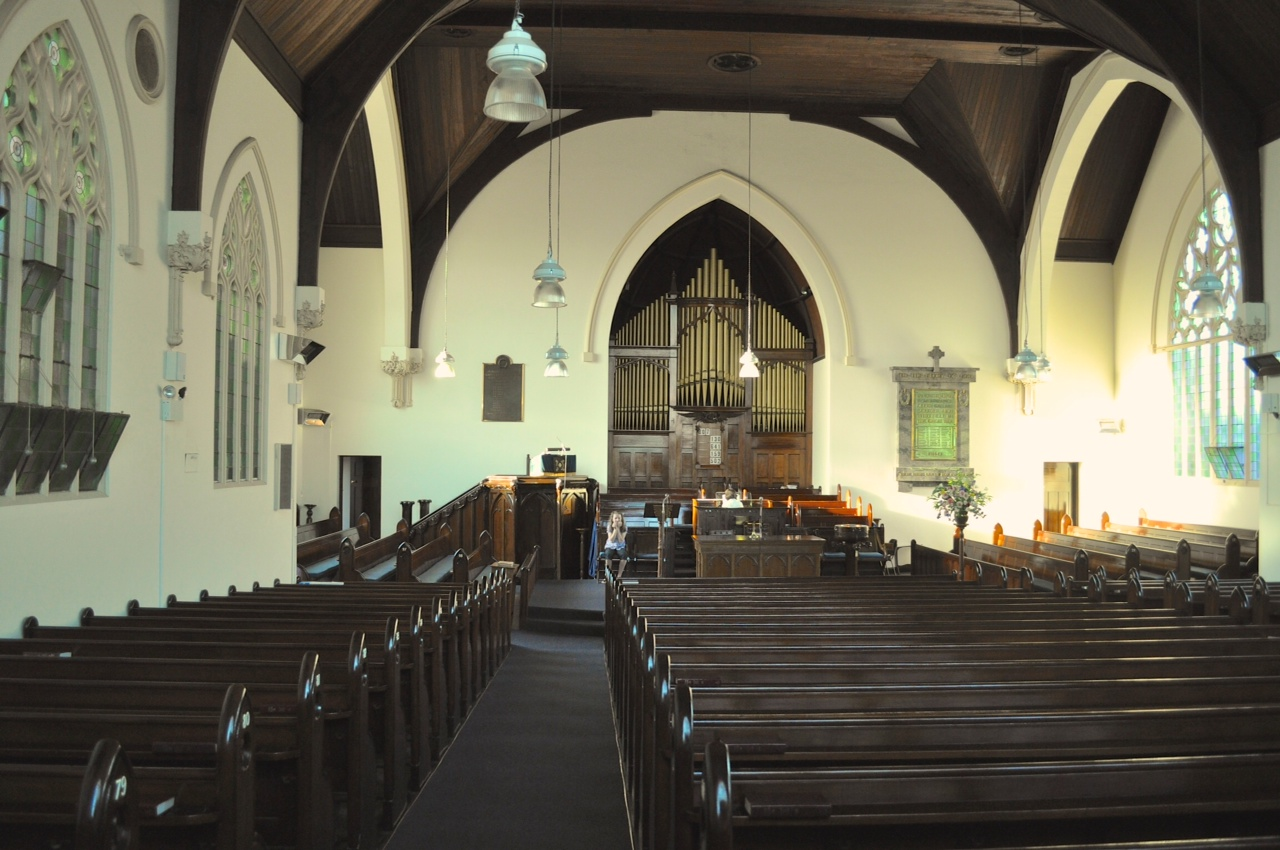
interior north

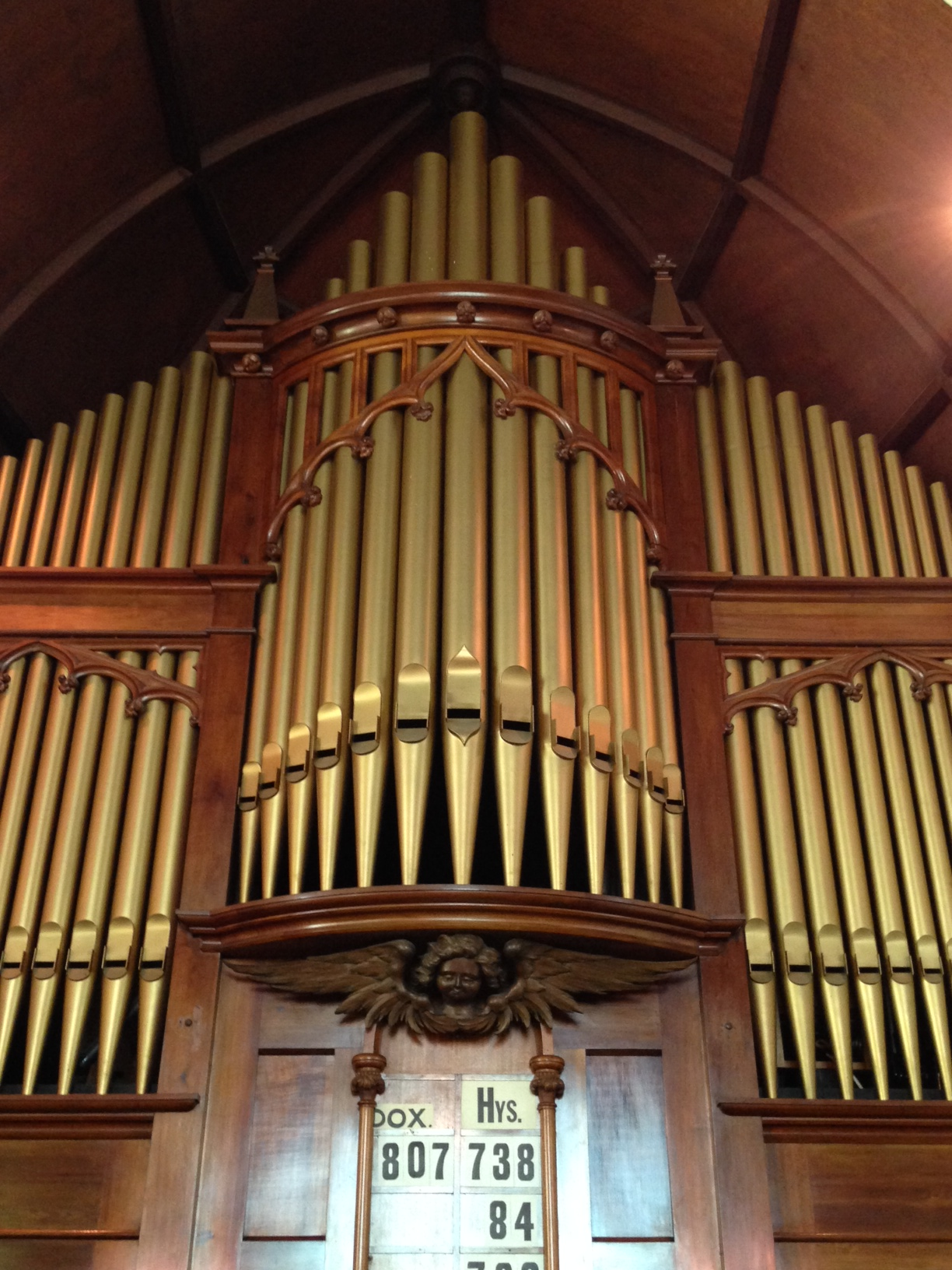
George Fincham organ 1906

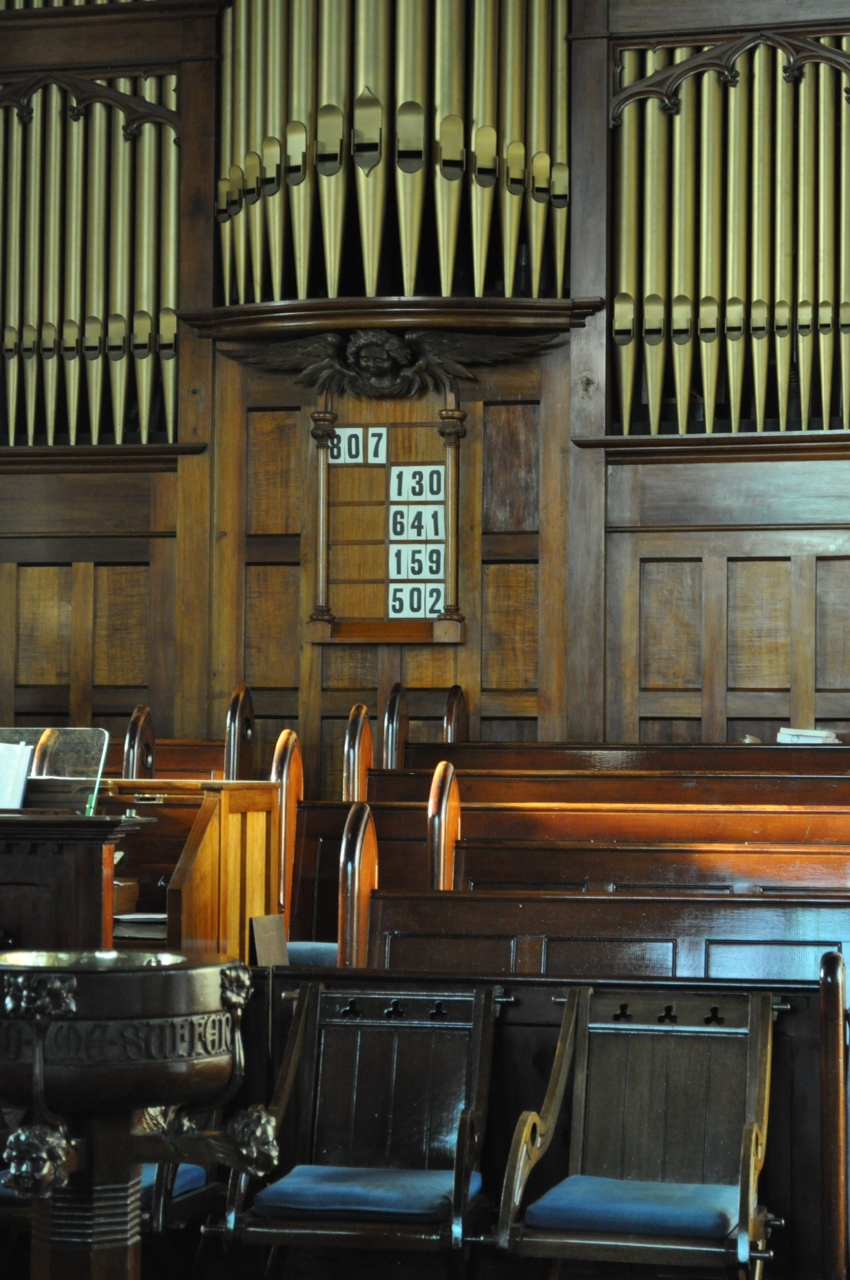
interior

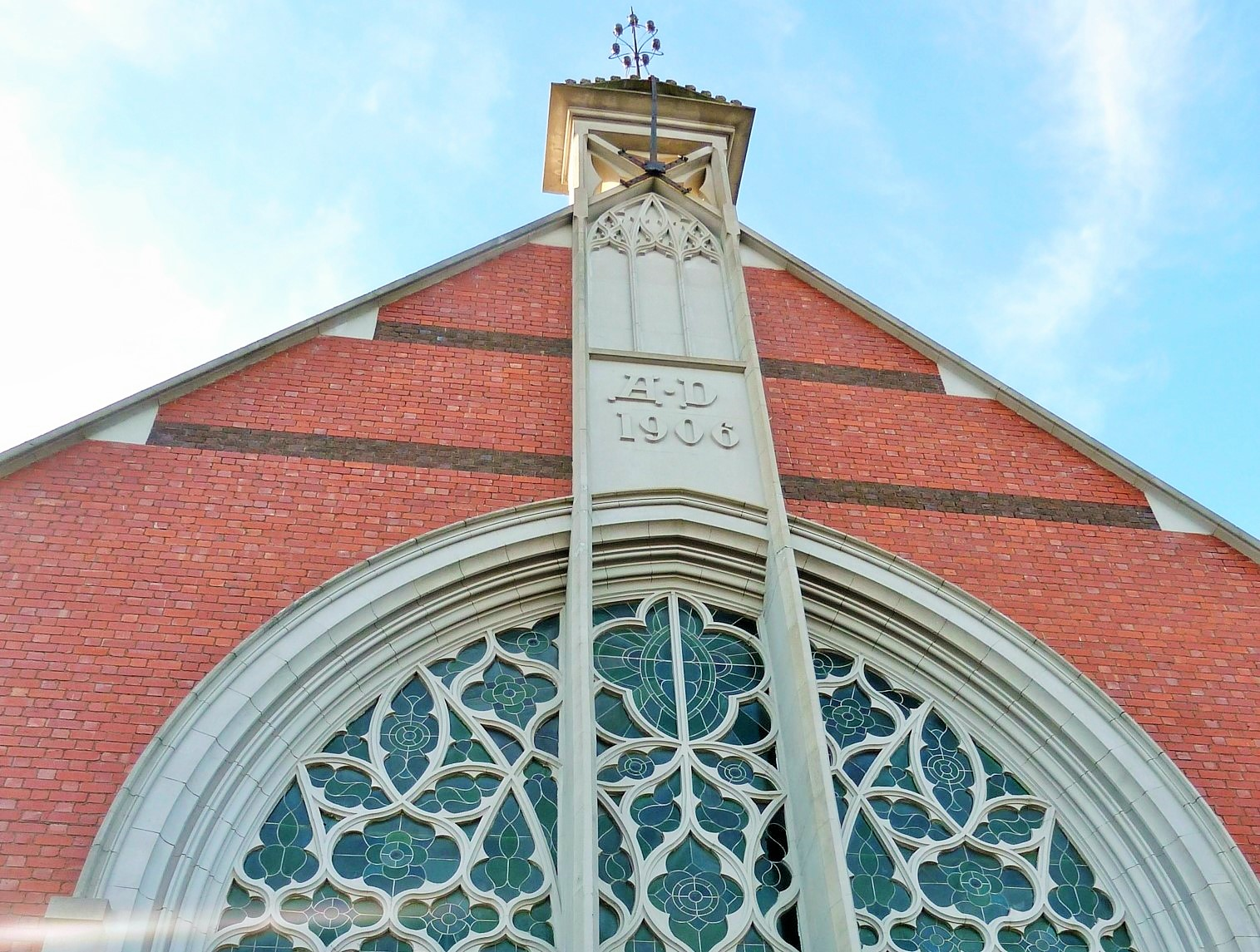
Street Facade to Wattletree Road

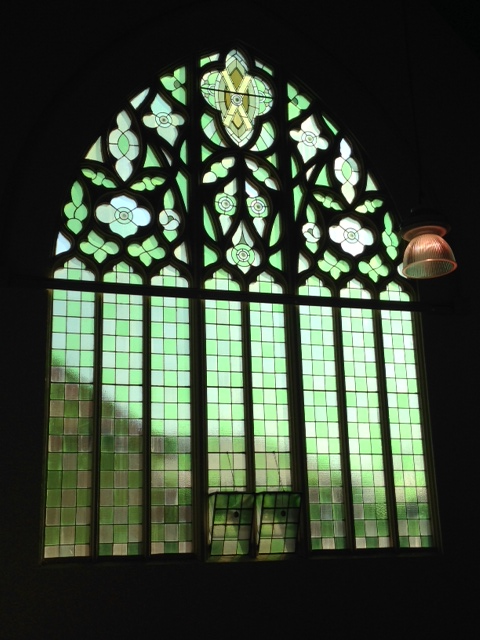
West window

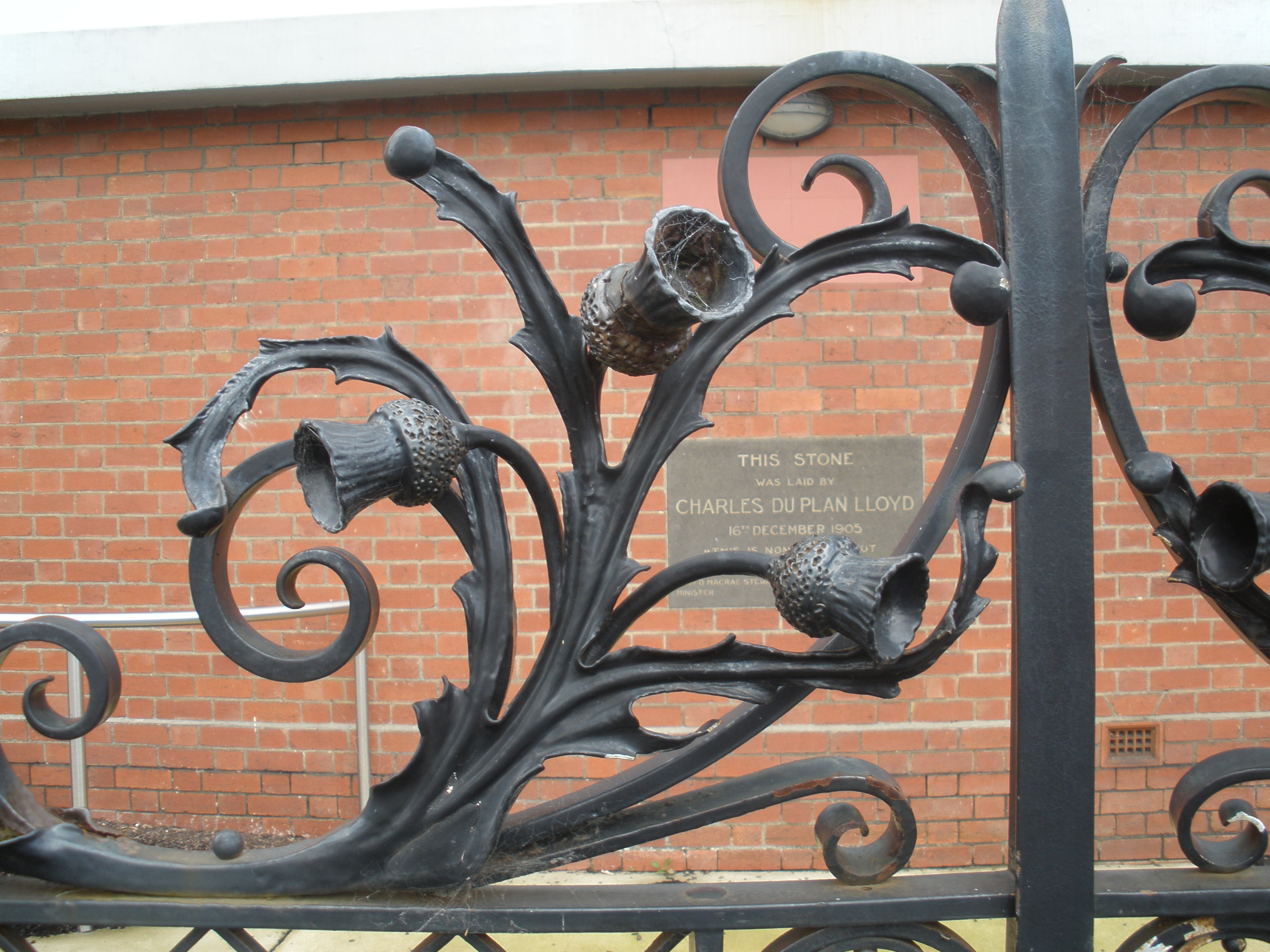
Scotch Thistle wrought iron gate and foundation stone laid 1905

== See also ==
- Presbyterian Church of Australia
- Australian non-residential architectural styles
