= Dismore =

Dismore is a surname of English origin. Notable people with the surname include:

- Andrew Dismore (born 1954), British politician
- Mark Dismore (born October 12, 1956), American racing driver
- William George Dismore Upjohn (1888–1979), Australian surgeon
