= 1947 New Year Honours (New Zealand) =

Annual awards for New Zealanders

The 1947 New Year Honours in New Zealand were appointments by King George VI on the advice of the New Zealand government to various orders and honours to reward and highlight good works by New Zealanders, and to celebrate the passing of 1946 and the beginning of 1947. They were announced on 1 January 1947.

The recipients of honours are displayed here as they were styled before their new honour.

== Knight Bachelor ==
- Charles Ernest Hercus DSO OBE MD – of Dunedin; professor of bacteriology and preventative medicine, University of Otago, and dean of the Medical School.
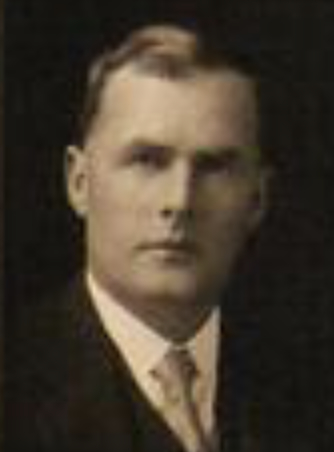
Sir Charles Hercus

== Order of the Bath ==
=== Companion (CB) ===
Military division

- Brigadier Keith Lindsay Stewart CBE DSO – New Zealand Staff Corps, New Zealand Military Forces.
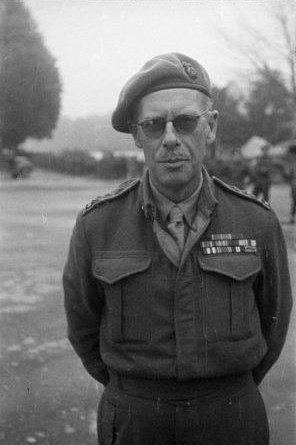
Keith Stewart

== Order of Saint Michael and Saint George ==
=== Knight Commander (KCMG) ===
- The Honourable Humphrey Francis O'Leary KC – Chief Justice.
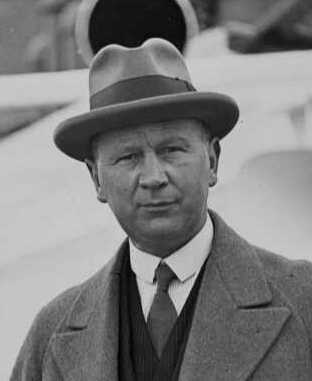
Sir Humphrey O'Leary

=== Companion (CMG) ===
- Howard Dartrey Charles Adams – of Wellington; parliamentary law draftsman.
- George Harry Uttley DSc – of Invercargill. For services as rector, Southland Boys' High School.

== Order of the British Empire ==
=== Knight Commander (KBE) ===
Civil division

- James Hight CMG LittD – of Christchurch; professor of history and political science, University of New Zealand, and formerly rector of Canterbury University College. For services to education.
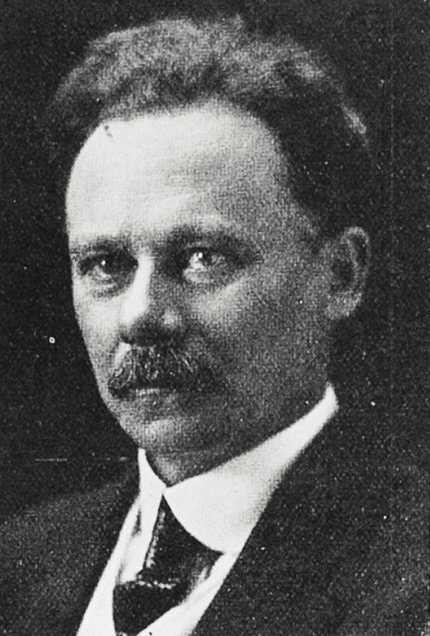
Sir James Hight

=== Commander (CBE) ===
Civil division

- James Hardie-Neil DSO MB ChB – of Auckland; a prominent medical practitioner.
- Colonel Ronald Henry Quilliam – of New Plymouth. For public services.

Military division

- Group Captain Malcolm Frederick Calder – Royal New Zealand Air Force.
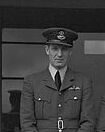
Malcolm Calder

=== Officer (OBE) ===
Civil division

- Robert Boulter CMG – United Kingdom trade commissioner in New Zealand. For services rendered to His Majesty's government in New Zealand during the war.
- Arthur Gordon Butchers – of Wellington; headmaster of the Correspondence School.
- Blanche Louise Clark – of Masterton. For services as matron, Wellington Public Hospital.
- Richard Francis Madden – of Wellington; secretary, Police Department.
- Alan Edward Mulgan – of Wellington. For services to literature, journalism and broadcasting.
- Robert Thomas George Patrick – first secretary, New Zealand legation, Moscow.
- Arthur Percy Postlewaite – of Auckland; president, Auckland Returned Services' Association.
- Captain Arthur Henry Prosser – of Auckland; Merchant Navy.
- Waimarama Puhara – of Pakipaki; chief of the Ngāti Kahungunu tribe.
- James Ernest Strachan – of Rangiora; principal, Rangiora High School.

Military division

- Captain George Hamilton Dennistoun DSO – Royal Navy (retired).
- Lieutenant-Colonel George Patrick – New Zealand Permanent Staff, New Zealand Military Forces.
- Acting Group Captain Thomas James Denton – Royal New Zealand Air Force.
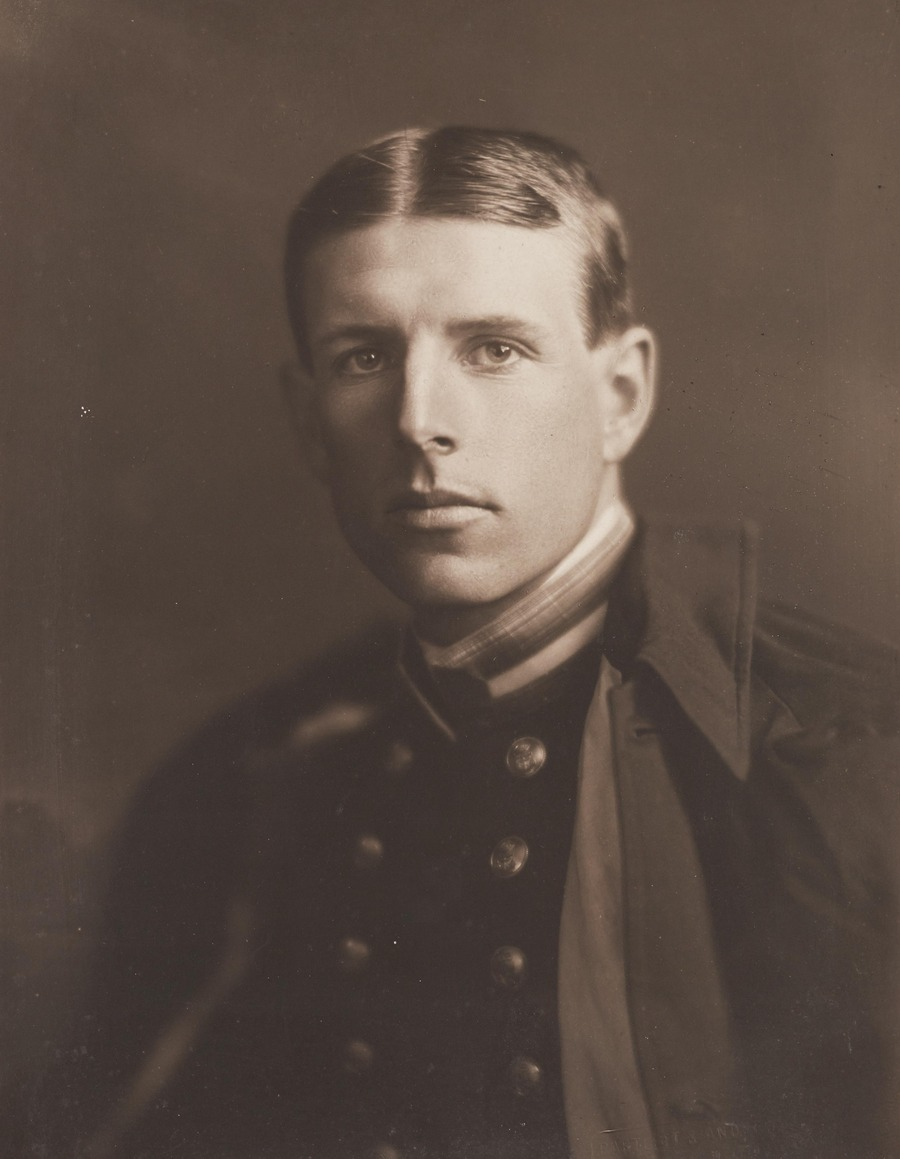
George Dennistoun

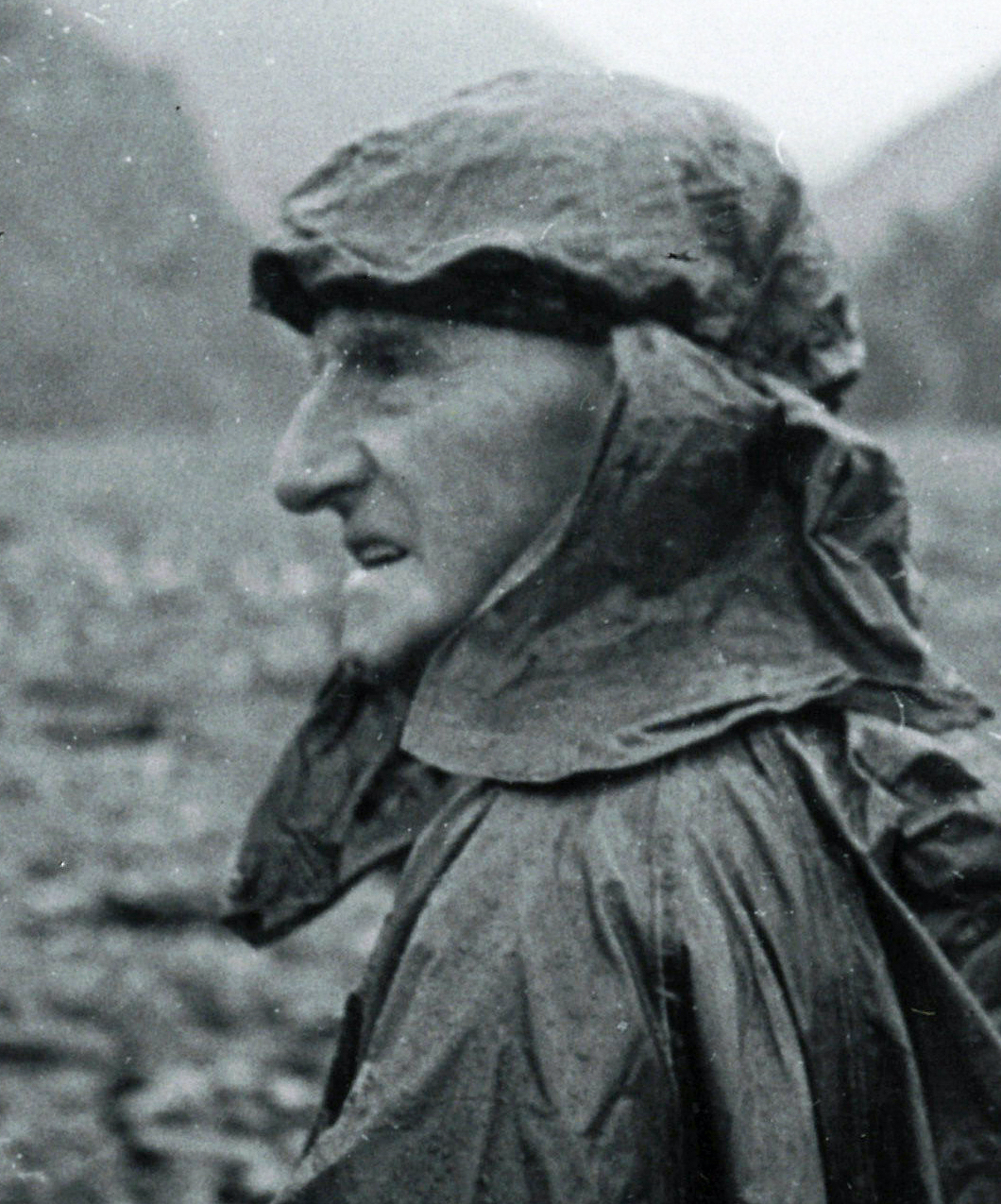
James Strachan

=== Member (MBE) ===
Civil division

- Sister Jessie Alexander – of Auckland; a missionary in the Urewera. For social-welfare work on behalf of Māori girls and boys.
- Isabella Banks – of Te Araroa; district health nurse.
- John Joseph Gallagher – of Wellington; employed in the Police Department.
- Deborah Goldsmith – of Brooklyn. For services in connection with patriotic and social-welfare movements.
- Frederick Vemon Horne – of Auckland; organiser of the Red Cross Transport Corps, Auckland, during the war.
- Minnie Johns Jeffery – of Dunedin; nurse inspector, Health Department.
- Martha Leslie – of Parnell. For services to the munitions industry during the war.
- George Jennings Petherick – of Wellington; a member of the Wellington Hospital Board.
- Alice Pochetty – employed in the high commissioner's office in London.
- John McLean Robertson – of Westport; mayor of Westport.
- Patrick Joseph Twomey – of Christchurch; secretary, Leper Trust Board, Christchurch.
- Helena Elizabeth Wise – of Eastbourne. For services in connection with patriotic and social-welfare movements during the war.

Military division

- William Corbet Laventure – temporary acting boatswain, Royal New Zealand Navy.
- Major John Henry Cowdrey – New Zealand Medical Corps, New Zealand Military Forces.
- Major Harry Stevens Harbott – New Zealand Military Forces.
- Major (temporary) (Quartermaster) Arthur Barrington Kitchen – Royal Regiment of Artillery.
- Senior Commander Geraldine Vida Moyle McClure – New Zealand Women's Army Auxiliary Corps.
- Flight Lieutenant Victor Graham Baskiville-Robinson – Royal New Zealand Air Force.
- Warrant Officer John Walter Cook – Royal New Zealand Air Force.

== British Empire Medal (BEM) ==
Military division

- Petty Officer Harold George Josey – Royal New Zealand Navy.
- Chief Petty Officer Cook (S) Francis Mervyn Thompson – Royal New Zealand Navy.
- Petty Officer Telegraphist Albert Charles Arthur Tite – Royal New Zealand Navy.
- Chief Wren (Second Class) Teresa Genevieve Williamson – Women's Royal New Zealand Naval Service.
- Staff-Sergeant (temporary Warrant Officer Class I) James Benjamin Bishop – Royal New Zealand Artillery, New Zealand Military Forces.
- Staff-Sergeant (temporary Warrant Officer Class I) Denis Christian Pedersen – New Zealand Permanent Staff, New Zealand Military Forces.
- Flight Sergeant Hugo Dickson – Royal New Zealand Air Force.
- Senior Sergeant Gwendoline Margaret Florence Matheson – New Zealand Women's Auxiliary Air Force.

== Air Force Cross (AFC) ==
- Acting Squadron Leader Robert Maxwell McKay – Royal New Zealand Air Force.
- Flight Lieutenant Arthur Oliver Hewitt – Royal New Zealand Air Force.

== Air Force Medal (AFM) ==
- Flight Sergeant Andrew Houston Campbell Aitken – Royal New Zealand Air Force.

== King's Commendation for Valuable Service in the Air ==
- Flying Officer Mervyn James Davies – Royal New Zealand Air Force.
- Flight Lieutenant John Raynor McClymont – Royal New Zealand Air Force.
- Flight Lieutenant William Allan Murray – Royal New Zealand Air Force.
