= Church of All Nations, Carlton =

Coordinates: 37°47′45″S 144°58′8″E

The Church of All Nations, Melbourne
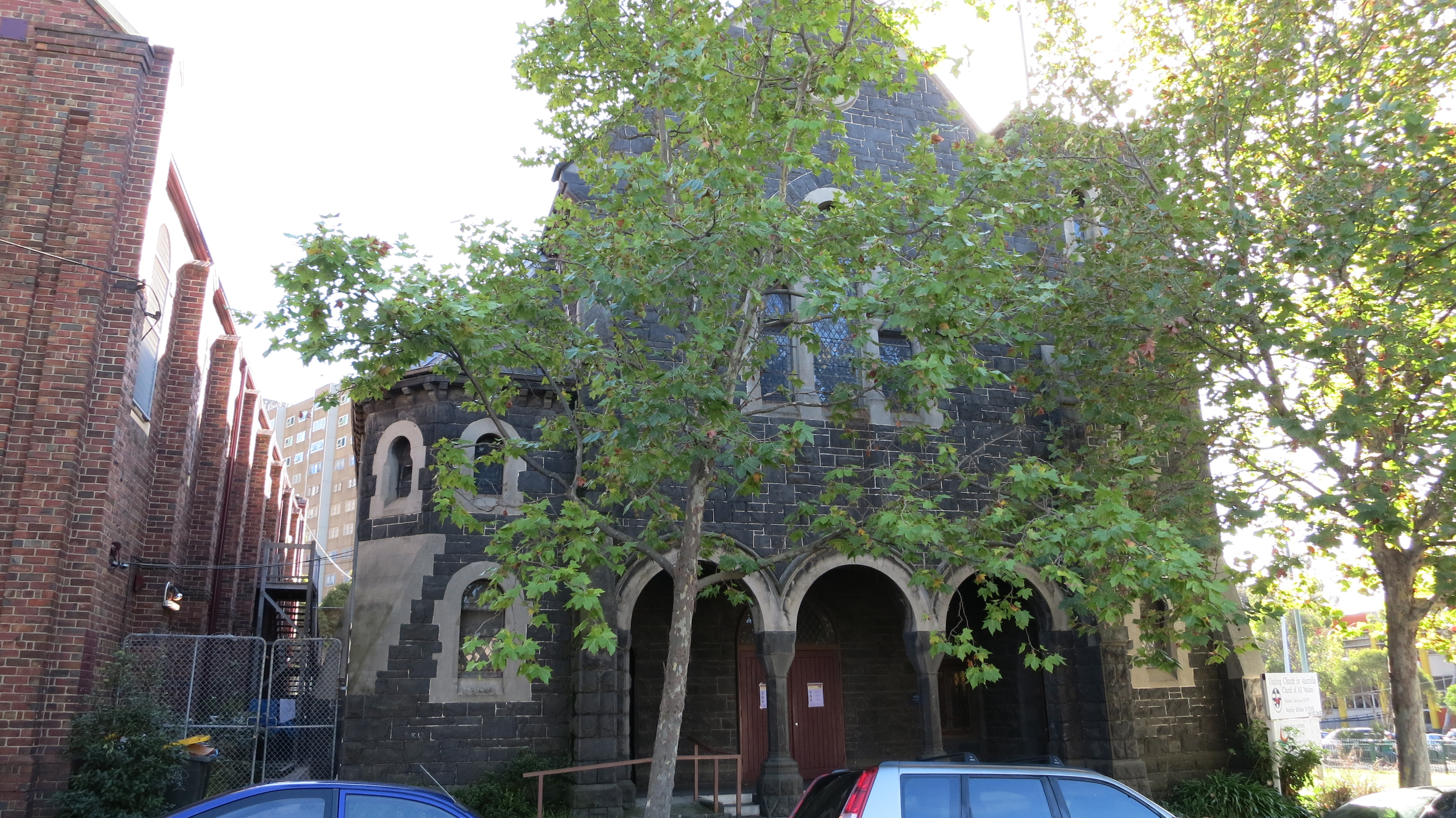
- Obscured facade of The Church of All Nations
- The Church of All Nations, Melbourne
- Address: 180 Palmerston Street, Carlton, Melbourne, Victoria
- Country: Australia
- Denomination: Uniting Church in Australia
- Previous denomination: Wesleyan Methodist
- Website: carlton-uca.org

History
- Former name: Wesleyan Methodist Church
- Status: Church
- Dedicated: 6 March 1870

Architecture
- Architect: Joseph Reed
- Architectural type: Church
- Style: Norman Romanesque

Specifications
- Materials: Bluestone

The Church of All Nations, formerly known as the Wesleyan Methodist Church, is a Uniting church located on 180 Palmerston Street, Carlton in Melbourne, Victoria, Australia. The first religious service held in the church was on Sunday, 6 March 1870.

The bluestone-covered church was designed by English architect Joseph Reed of Reed & Barnes. Mr Johns Pidgon was contracted to build the Romanesque building after the church received a loan of £300 for its construction when the previous (Stucco) brick chapel beside it became too small for the growing congregation.

The Church of All Nations and its organ (built by George Fincham in 1886) are listed on the Victorian Heritage Register.

== History ==
After designing almost every major church building in Carlton (including St Jude's, the Congregational Church and the Church of the Sacred Heart), Joseph Reed's Gothic design suffered two setbacks. The first design announcement in 1857 was communally opposed, and the Wesleyan Church Architecture article guide published by the Wesleyan Chronicle changed the style and forms of the building from a Roman Gothic pageantry to a more Romanesque Norman architectural language.

Due to funding issues, the central area of the church was shortened, and neither the grand spire nor the surrounding balconies were constructed. The building still stands as an important and significant piece of Australian architecture, representing a fine example of the Norman Romanesque Revival style in the state of Victoria.

== Description ==
The Church of All Nations building is covered in a dominant bluestone with freestone dressings. The exterior features many architectural languages. From the front elevation, the observer is confronted with three Romanesque Revival arches which shelter the porch and a tower on the right hand side. The designs of the small circular windows and semi-circular arches are repeated around the building.

In detail, the front section reveals signs of having been added after the original construction. The side windows that were the two original entrances in 1870 now appear to have been pushed back from the face of the stonework and the corners are beveled. Internally, the building has a gallery at the rear of the building. The original plan featured galleries on both sides, but they proved too hot during the summer. The rear gallery was used for the multilingual translation booths from the 1960s, and is now used for office space. Directly opposite, the timber pulpit (with stairs leading up either from either side) is located under the tall ceiling, a technique to obtain good acoustics. The acoustics were exploited by the Fincham Organ, built by George Fincham in 1877 which was donated to the church by the younger members of the congregation. The organ is located on the north east side of the church.

The pews were removed in the early 21st century to create a more flexible worship and community venue. The wood from the pews was turned into mobile storage cupboards and panelling for a concealed kitchen inside the church, with seating since provided by chairs. Long-term congregation member Paul Madden (1946-2022) was recognised for his contribution to the church and Carlton community -- including conversion of the worship space and its use as a community venue for rehearsals, performances, book events, etc.; his conversion of the western staircase into a glassed-in chapel in memory of Rev. Dr Doug Fullerton & Ethel Fullerton; and his decades of fundraising and operational support for CAN community services -- with a stained glass window on the western side of the church, designed and made by Cedar Prest AO and unveiled on 26 November 2023.

== Gallery ==
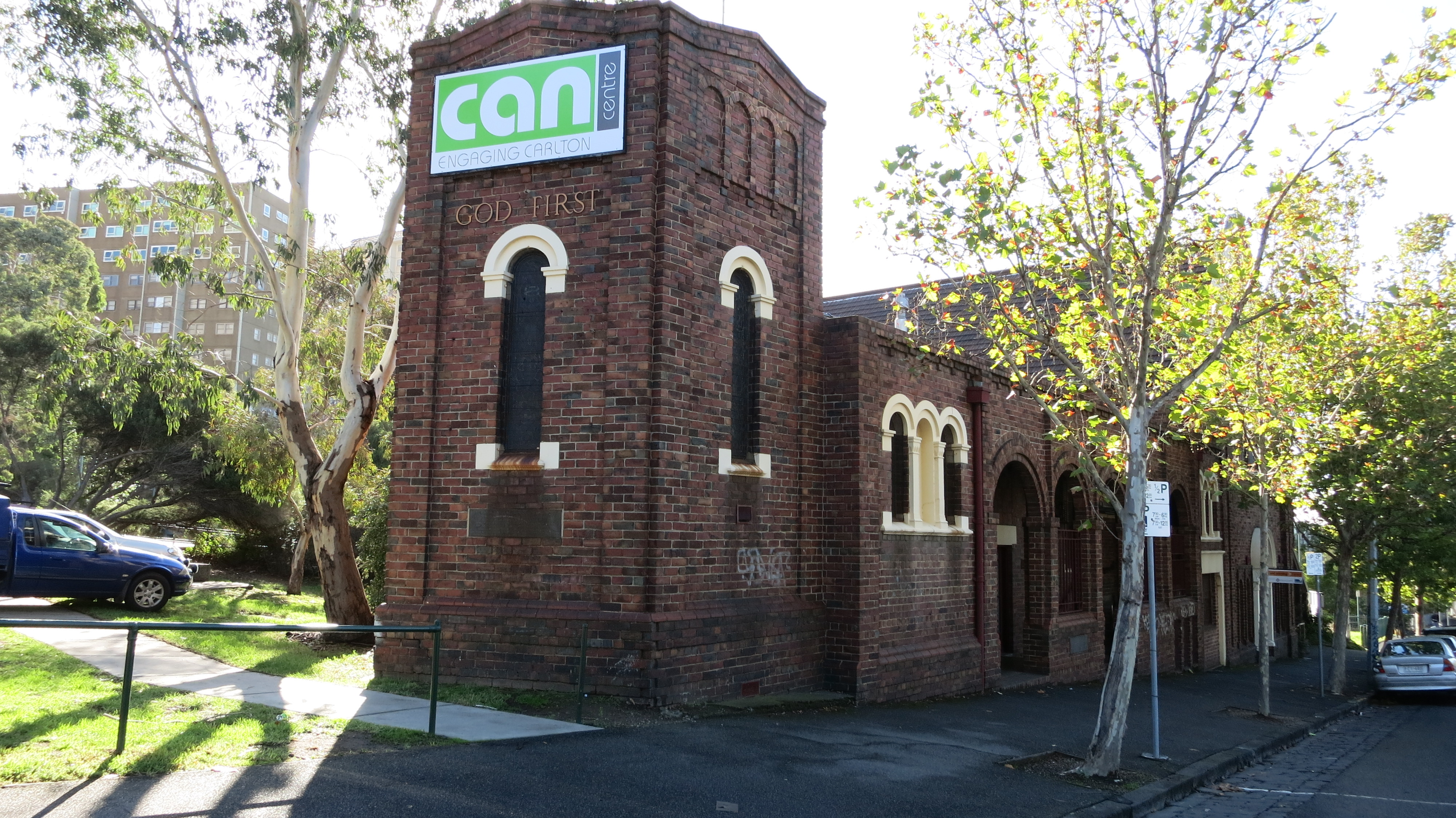
Wesleyan Methodist Church (previous building)

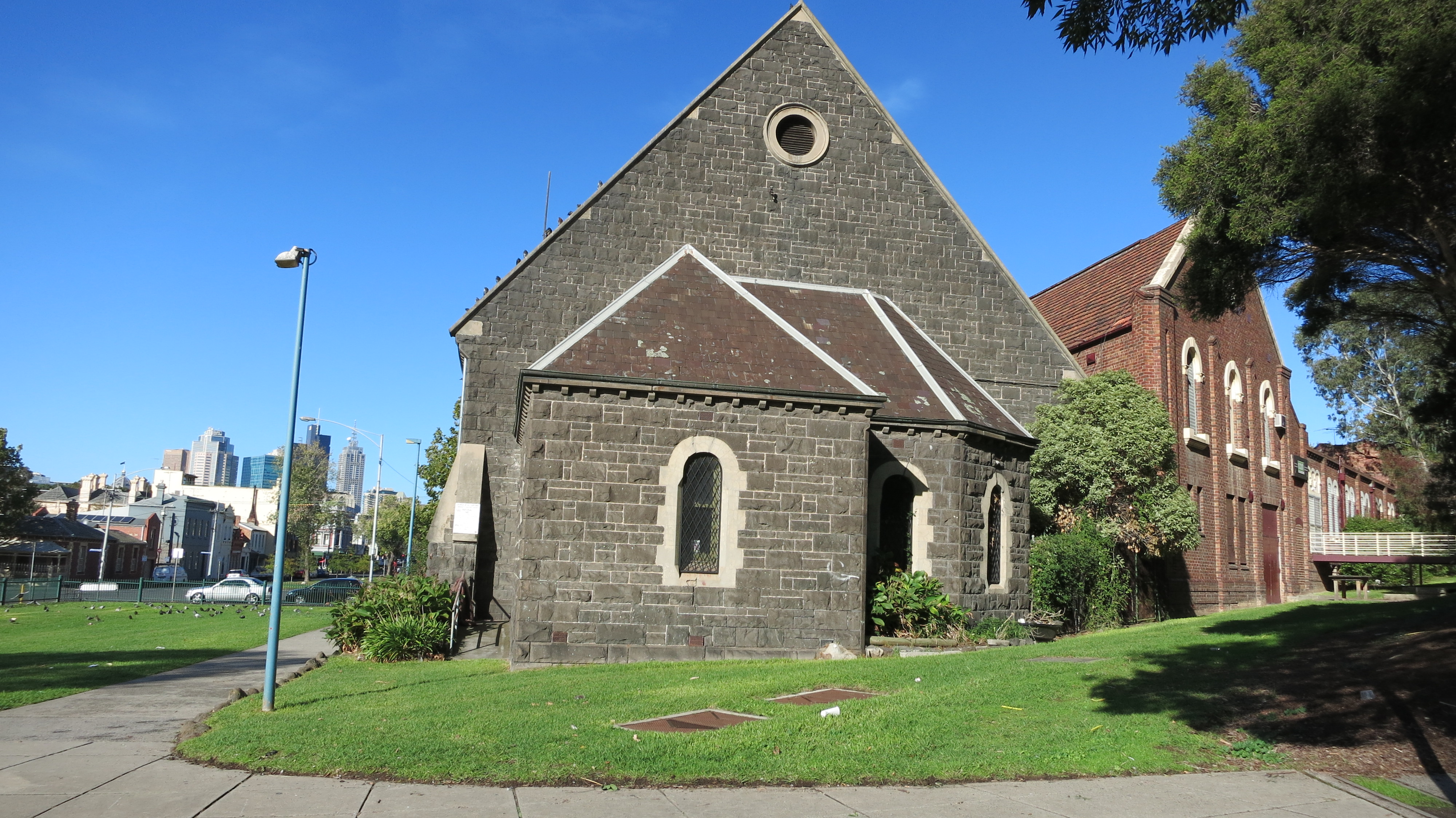
Rear view of the Church of All Nations

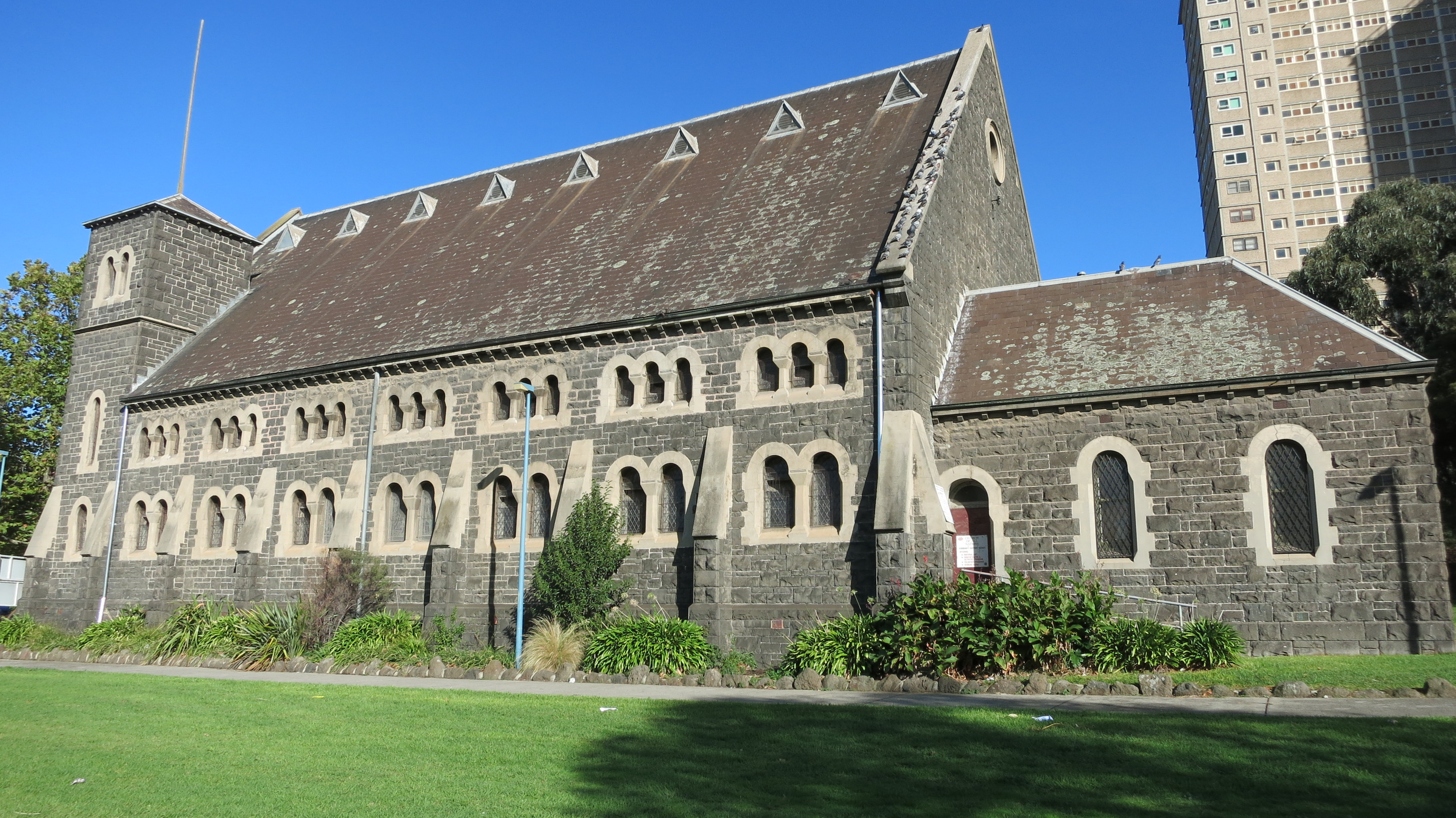
Profile view of the Church of All Nations
