= George Fincham =

Organ builder (1828–1910)

- Born: 20 August 1828. London, England
- Died: 21 December 1910 (aged 82); Melbourne, Australia
- Occupation: Organ builder
- Notable work: The organ at the Royal Exhibition Building, Melbourne

George Fincham & Sons
- Industry: Pipe organ design and building. Pipe organ restoration
- Founded: 1862
- Headquarters: Richmond; Melbourne, Australia
- Key people: George Fincham
- Products: Pipe organs

George Fincham (20 August 1828 – 21 December 1910) was an organ builder active in Australia.

Fincham was born in London; his father (Jonathan George Fincham) and grandfather were both organ builders and so it is not surprising he practised this trade himself. He was apprenticed in 1842–49 to the London organ builder Henry Bevington, and then worked as a foreman for James Bishop & Son. Fincham emigrated to Australia in 1852 and started working as an organ tuner and repairer 113 Queen Street in Melbourne. In 1853 he went to the diggings at Ballarat. He returned to Melbourne in 1854 and worked as a builder on the Spencer Street railway station. Within ten years of his arrival in Australia he had raised sufficient funds to equip a workshop and buy stock to begin organ building as George Fincham & Sons. Also by this time churches had funds for pipe organs and interest in organ music was growing, helped by the arrival of organists such as Charles Horsley, David Lee and the Revd George Torrance in Australia. The organ building business grew and by 1904 he had a branches in Adelaide and Sydney, and agents in Perth and Brisbane.

Altogether he built about 200 organs for cathedrals and churches and supplied pipe work and parts to organ builders throughout Australasia. His integrity and the quality of the organs he built overcame the prejudice towards colonial work. He was outstanding among Australian organ builders for his skill, his business ability and his readiness to keep pace with modern trends. He patented many improvements; most of the organs he built had mechanical action and from 1886 some had tubular-pneumatic.

Fincham died in Melbourne in 1910. His company, continued by his sons and grandsons, completed many projects in more than a century of organ building. It closed down in February 2006.

== Notable organs ==
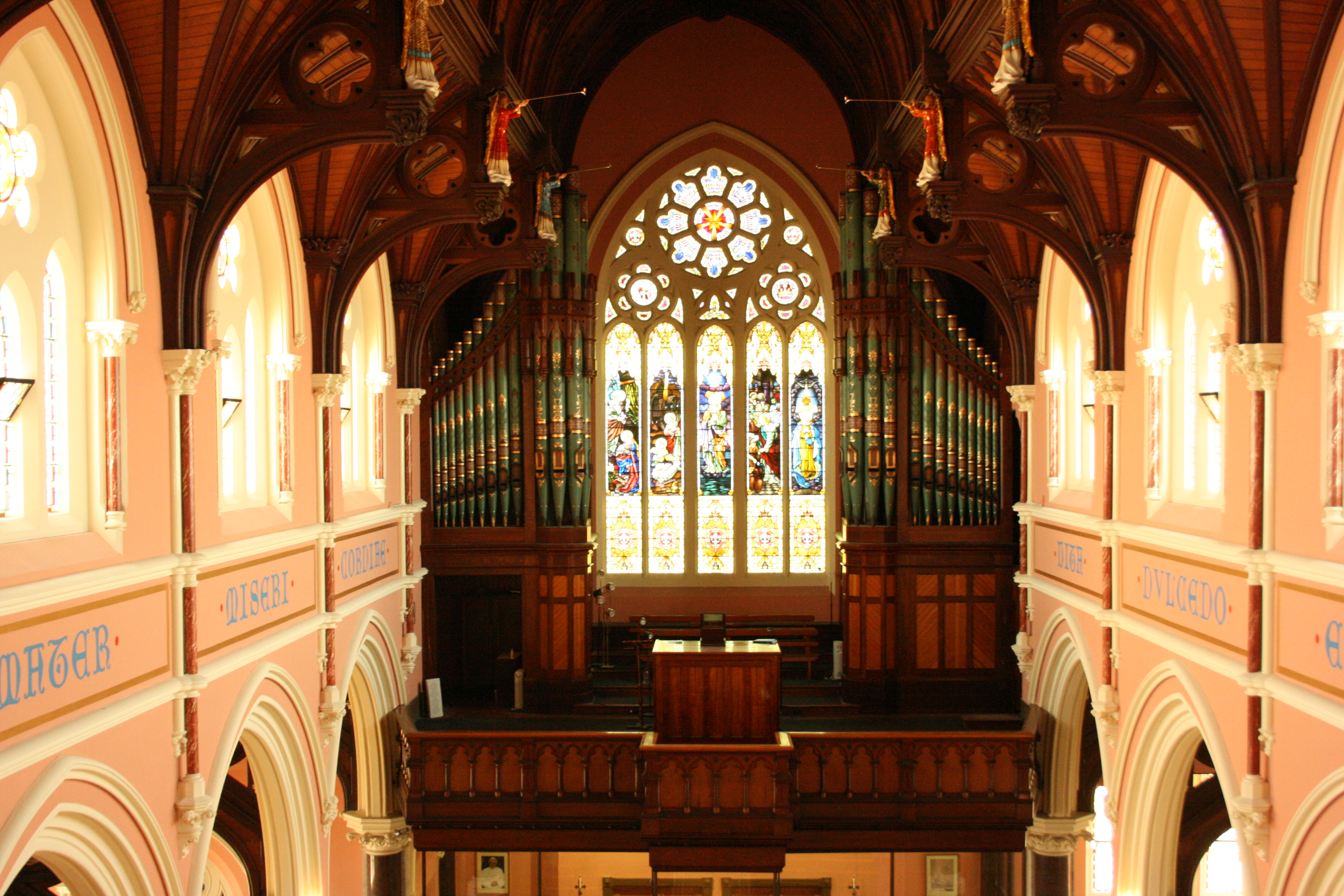
The organ at St Mary Star of the Sea, West Melbourne

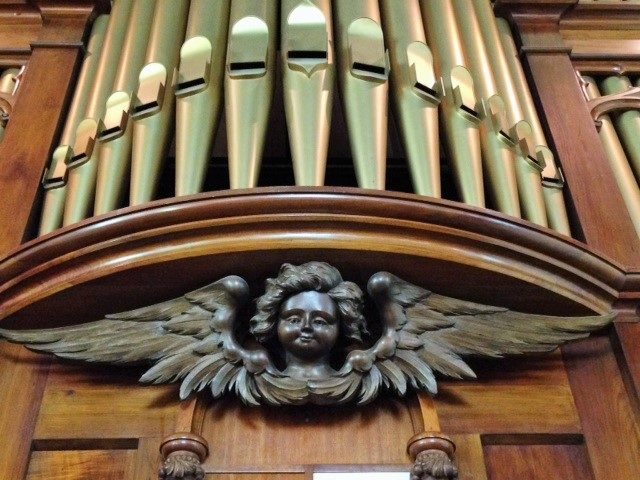
Wooden casing designed by Robert J Haddon 1906 for George Fincham Organ at Malvern Presbyterian Church, Melbourne

His notable instruments include:

- Intercolonial Exhibition of Australasia (built by Fincham in 1866).
- Ormond Anglican Church, Part of this organ is the first organ built by Fincham after moving to the colony of Victoria. The other part was built by one of his grandsons and the two were put together by a Perth based organ builder
- Royal Exhibition Building, Melbourne (built by Fincham in 1880) – considered his magnum opus.
- St Francis Xavier Catholic Church, Frankston (built by Fincham's son Leslie Fincham in 1927, and refurbished by his grandson George B. Fincham in 1977).
- St Kilda Town Hall (built by Fincham in 1892) – destroyed by fire on 7 April 1991.
- St Mary Star of the Sea, West Melbourne (built by Fincham between 1898 and 1900) – "Australia's largest 19th-century instrument still intact".
- Malvern Presbyterian Church, Melbourne (built by Fincham in 1906) – still in good working order.
- St. Patrick's Cathedral, Melbourne (built by Fincham's grandson George B. Fincham in 1962).
- Church of All Nations (Melbourne) (built by Fincham in 1877, Swell added by Fincham in 1886)

== See also ==
- List of organ builders
