= Cedar Prest =

Australian stained glass artist (born 1940)

Cedar Prest AO
- Education: University of Melbourne; National Gallery of Victoria Art School; Hornsey College of Art
- Style: stained glass
- Website: cedarprest.com.au

Cedar Prest AO (born 1940) is an Australian stained glass artist based in Maslin Beach, South Australia.

== Early life and education ==
She has a B.A. and Dip.Ed. from the University of Melbourne (1961) and also studied drawing at the National Gallery of Victoria Art School at night, then completed a post diploma in stained glass at Hornsey College of Art, London (1966). She received an Australia Council grant to study the contemporary architectural glass masters in Germany (1975) from which came a community glass project at Parks Community Centre in 1979–80.

Further study was undertaken in 2002–2003 on a Churchill Fellowship at the University of Creation Spirituality in Oakland, California. She then trained as a labyrinth facilitator at Grace Cathedral, San Francisco, 2002 with a follow-up workshop in Chartres Cathedral in 2004.

== Honours ==
Prest was made a member in the General Division of the Order of Australia in 1987 for service to the art of stained glass and to the community particularly youth.

== Works ==
- From her study of contemporary architectural glass masters in Germany came a community glass project at Parks Community Centre at Angle Park, South Australia in 1979-80 and eight others in public spaces like theatres schools and libraries.
- St Peter's Cathedral includes 48 clerestory stained glass windows, providing 'a brilliantly constructed narrative history of South Australia ... full of "droughts and flooding rains"'
- She donated two stained glass windows "depicting mazes leading to constellations, bridges and animals" to the Royal Alexandra Hospital for Children Camperdown, she had "won a section of the Australian National Glass Association's Oz Glass Competition (seeking) to find suitable windows for the room in the hospital".
- A "rippling glass mural" dominating the arrival hall of the new Sydney International Terminal at Sydney Airport All the glass was custom made working with Freedom glass in Freemantle WA too make it an All Australian welcome.
- The stained glass window in honour of Mollie Thompson in Macquarie University's library, is one of four entrance and spacious foyer.
- Adelaide College of Divinity a labyrinth designed to honour the journeys of refugees and migrants. Symbols incorporated in the labyrinth include a large chalice and a central wafer - a reference to Holy Communion. A stylised version of the labyrinth is used as the college logo.
- Stained glass windows in a number of schools: Yirara College of the Finke River Mission 1985, Pedare Christian College 1998, Pembroke 1999, Loreto College 2000 and Tanunda 2001 and recently labyrinths at Northfield Primary 2004 and Loreto College 2007.
- A stained glass window in the Church of All Nations in Carlton, Victoria.
