= Jessie Alexander =

New Zealand Presbyterian deaconess and missionary

Jessie Alexander MBE (2 June 1876 – 27 March 1962) was a New Zealand Presbyterian deaconess and missionary.

== Early life ==
Alexander was born in Brantford, Ontario, Canada, on 2 June 1876, to Mary Munro and William Alexander. Both her parents were Scottish. Around 1877–1878, the family moved to Dunedin, New Zealand, later relocating to Wairoa, Hawkes Bay around 1909.

== Religious work ==
Alexander entered the Presbyterian Women's Training Institute in Dunedin in 1912. She was ordained Deaconess at the General Assembly of 1913, after two years of study.

=== Nūhaka ===
As part of the Presbyterian Māori Mission, Alexander was posted as a missionary to Nūhaka, near Wairoa. This was a challenging post as at this time most Māori belonged to the Church of Jesus Christ of Latter-Day Saints. She and her father moved to a house near the township of Nūhaka, using the kitchen of their home as a church. A Bible study class and a popular weekly social group were established. Fellow missionaries Edith Walker and May Gardiner joined Alexander at the mission in 1914 and 1919 respectively; both were later ordained as deaconesses. Alexander studied the Māori language, and gave medical care in the township until 1918 when her sister Lillian, a trained nurse, took over the brunt of the medical work. Following the 1918 influenza epidemic, Alexander got the Māori Mission Committee to open a small cottage hospital in Nūhaka, which Lillian ran until 1922.

=== Waikaremoana ===
In the winter, Nūhaka was cut off from Wairoa and its roads were inaccessible, so Alexander, Walker and Gardiner made horseback trips to Waikaremoana, a 106-mile return journey. They were welcomed by Māori and Pākehā alike in the area, and in 1921 Alexander and Gardiner accepted an invitation from Waikaremoana's Māori community to start missionary work there. A young women's group from John Knox Church in Rangiora raised funds for a cottage to be built there. Alexander and Gardiner commenced missionary work in Waikaremoana on the 14 December 1921. Local members of the Ringatū church were suspicious of this work until it became clear that the women were preaching the Bible rather than Presbyterianism. Alexander became respected as a healer, known for her high success rates and always beginning the treatment with a prayer. She resigned from the Waikaremoana mission in 1923 due to poor health and returned to Wairoa.

=== Later work ===
Alexander moved to Taupō in 1925, but fell out with and was replaced by the Māori Mission Committee in late 1926. She did relief work until 1929, when she agreed start a mission in Ōpōtiki. She was the first Protestant missionary to live in Ōpōtiki since the 1865 killing of Carl Völkner. Before her 1934 resignation, she established two Sunday Schools, a day school and services in six different locations. She retired from the Māori Mission in 1936. In her retirement, she did deputation work for the church in Southland and worked with the Baptist Church in Honolulu, Hawaii. On her return to New Zealand she settled in Auckland and established hostels for young Māori looking for work in the city. She was a founding member of the United Māori Mission, taught Māori at the New Zealand Bible Institute and took regular services in Māori.

In the 1947 New Year Honours, Alexander was appointed a Member of the Order of the British Empire, for social welfare work with Māori children.

Alexander died in Auckland on 27 March 1962, and she was buried at Purewa Cemetery.
