= Robert Joseph Haddon =

Robert Joseph Haddon (1866–1929) was an England-born architect who practised in Victoria in the 1900s-1910s. He was a major figure in the profession in Victoria, championing the Arts and Crafts in his writing and teaching. He designed some of the most original buildings of the period, featuring restraint, balanced asymmetry and Art Nouveau details.

== Biography ==
Haddon was born in London, and training there in the early 1880s, before emigrating to Australia in 1889 when he was 25. After a few years in Melbourne, faced with the crash of the 1890s, he relocated a number of times around southern Australia, including Perth for a while as the Assistant Architect at the Department of Public Works, He finally settled back in Melbourne in 1899, setting up his own practice in 1902.

Haddon worked extensively on councils, examining boards and committees, while writing a number of articles in technical magazines, as well as a book (Australian Domestic Architecture) in 1908. As the head of the architecture school, the Melbourne Technical College from 1902, he taught several generations of students. He opened a practice as an architectural consultant, taking on Percy Oakley as his first assistant, and William Alexander in 1903, who was made a full partner seven years later. On his deathbed, he made provision for the richest traveling scholarship in the Empire at the time.

== Architectural work ==
Many buildings are supposedly attributed to Robert Joseph Haddon without actually bearing his name. When Haddon practiced in Melbourne, much of his work was acting as a consultant to other firms, notably the practice Sydney Smith & Ogg. He also consulted with regional practices including Camperdown (Victoria) based firms Tombs & Durran and Michael McCabe & Perry Knights, as well as Geelong architects Buchan & Laird.

Milton House in Flinders Lane (1901) and Eastbourne House in Wellington Parade, East Melbourne (1901), are both private hospitals designed by Sydney Smith & Ogg, but are unlike most of their work, and contain features which suggest that Haddon was largely responsible. They are both composed of carefully placed elements and ornament on plain surfaces, with distinctive Art Nouveau details in wrought iron and terra cotta.

Buildings they may hint at his hand include elevations composed with balanced asymmetry, windows of varied shapes and sizes, but set simply without architraves in plain wall surfaces, with an area or feature with a burst of extravagance.

== Publications ==
Australian Architecture, 1908. This has been described by writer Nick Bryant, in the Global Mail as "THE EMERGENCE of a style of architecture immediately recognisable as Australian had been taken as a given when in 1908 Robert Haddon became the first local architect to write a book, Australian Architecture, solely devoted to local buildings. Naturally it would come, predicted Haddon, from the "points of peculiar difference that will always separate our Australian requirements and practice from that of the old world""

A section on 'Australian Planning and Construction' in volume 5 of Modern Buildings: their Planning, Construction and Equipment, edited by G. A. T. Middleton (London, 1905–06)

== Key projects ==
=== Former Fourth Victoria Building ===
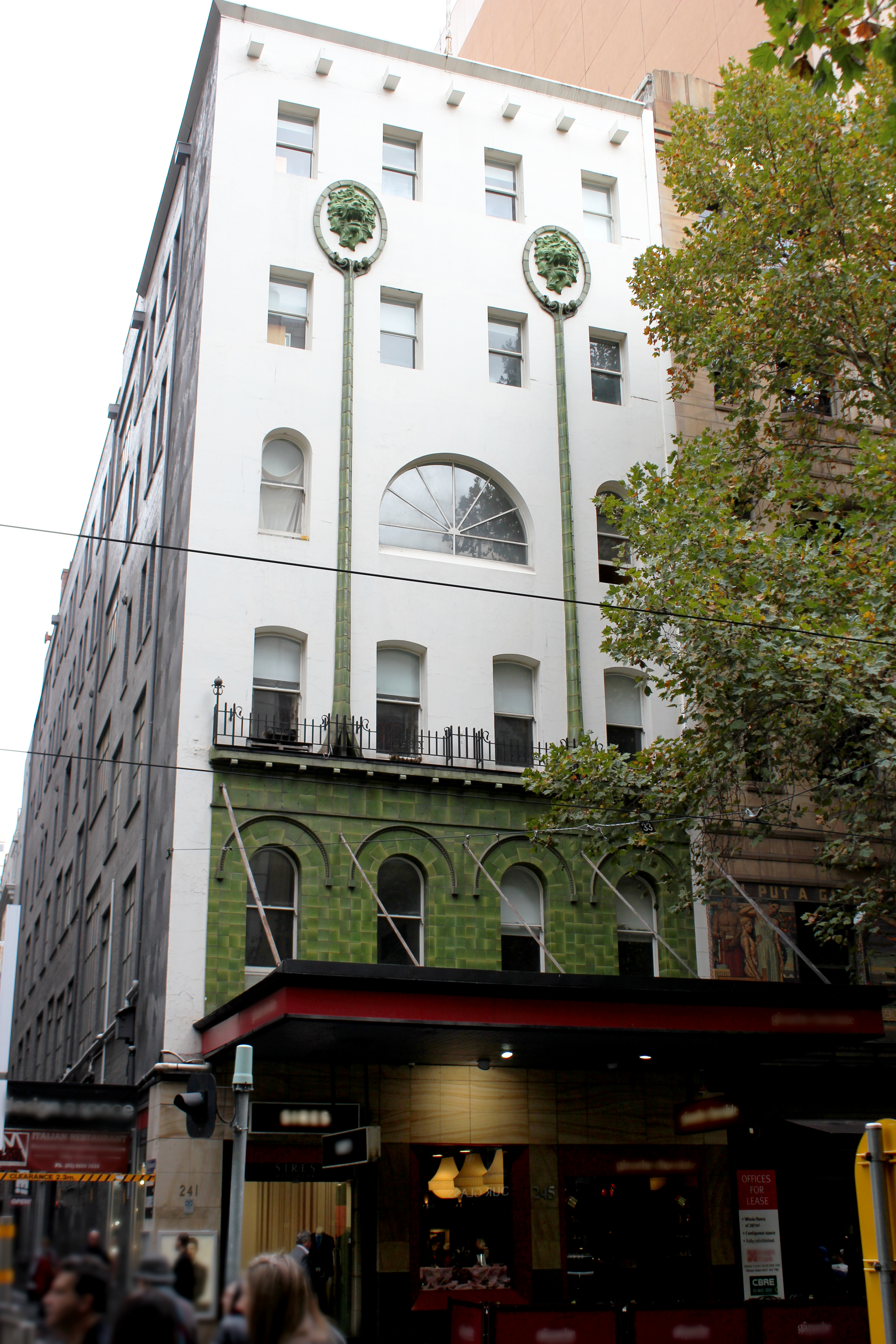
Former Fourth Victoria Building

The Fourth Victoria Building, at 273 Collins Street, Melbourne, was originally a brick warehouse, built in 1884 and remodelled in 1912 by Robert Haddon for its new owner, the Fourth Victoria Building Society. The remodelled design differed greatly from the architectural scape of Melbourne at the time. The building's Eastern Façade is approached as a whimsical interpretation derived from his passion in the Arts and Crafts movement in Europe. Above the ground floor shop front and awning, the first floor façade is covered with a panel of green glazed tiles, surmounted by a stylised wrought iron balcony. The façade above this is of plain white render pierced by windows without architraves. Above the fifth level are two large majolica medallions, containing green lions' heads, and trunk-like elements dribbled from these down the façade. The innovative ideas implemented through the materiality and design placed this building in a close threshold of Early European Modernism. The significance of Haddon's approach on Australian architecture thereafter was noted by Robin Boyd. Following the completion of the building, an article by the title "Art and architecture: the possibility of tiles" published in The Argus newspaper on 17 March 1915 complimented the architect and encouraged the architecture to be inspired from innovative materiality as a notion of breaking apart from tradition. Later on, many buildings like Her Majesty's Theatre and Melbourne Town Hall incorporated the use of the green glazed tiles and publicised its identity as a façade element.

=== Anselm ===
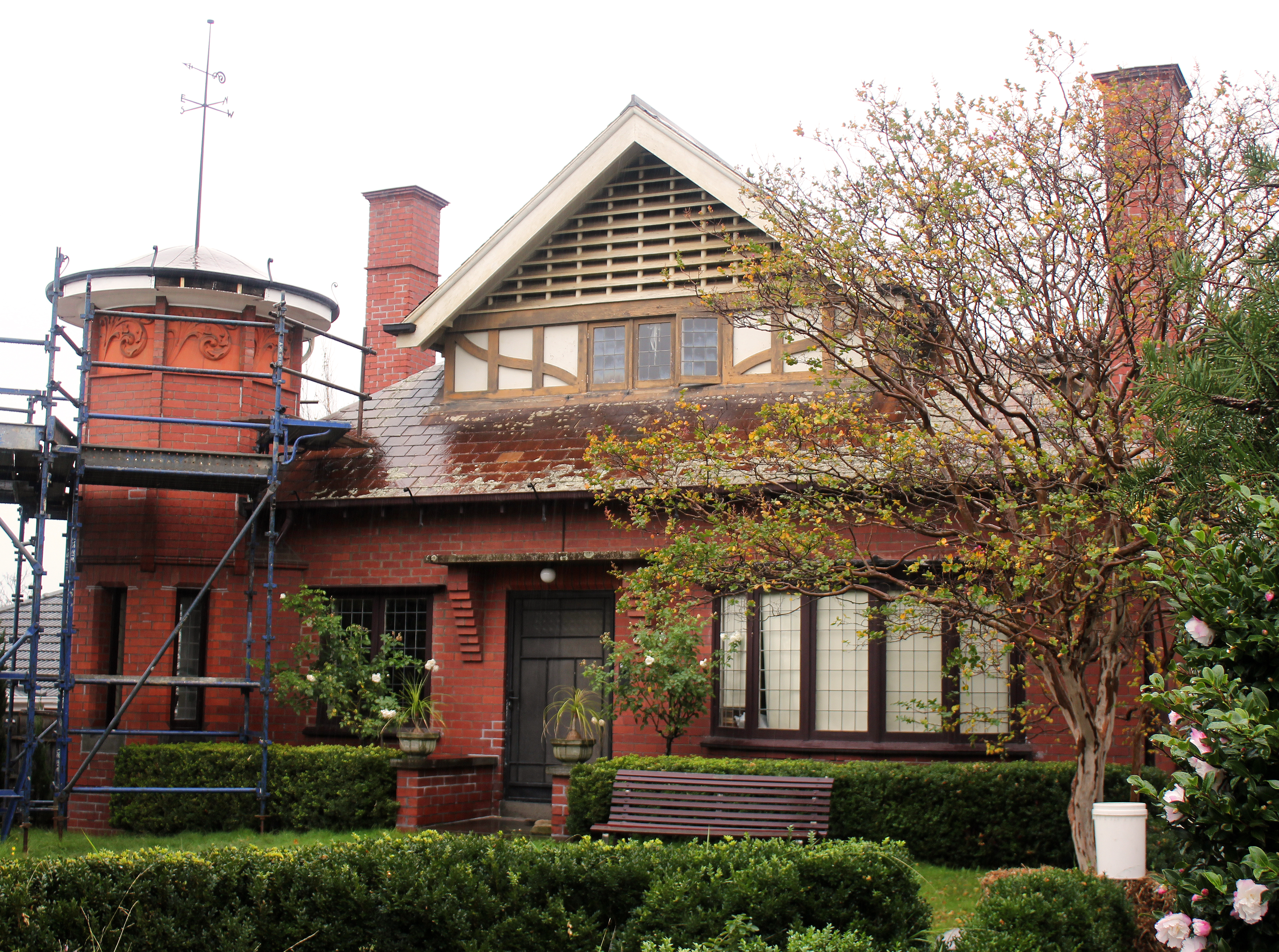
Anselm House

In his own house, "Anselm" at 4 Glenferrie Street Caulfield, Victoria, Australia, built in 1907, Robert Haddon implemented his Art Nouveau ideas with his originality of unconventional architecture. Anselm plays with the hierarchy and scale of Art Nouveau classics such as a dominant octagonal tower, visible chimney stacks and steep pitched roofs that bleed onto the building as decorative façade elements. Haddon treated the building with an open plan living that created a mixture of usable spaces and designed without hallways, which was unusual at the time. The building was a grand gesture that Haddon posed to the community, of his image as an influential architect, teacher and a writer.

=== Malvern Presbyterian Church ===
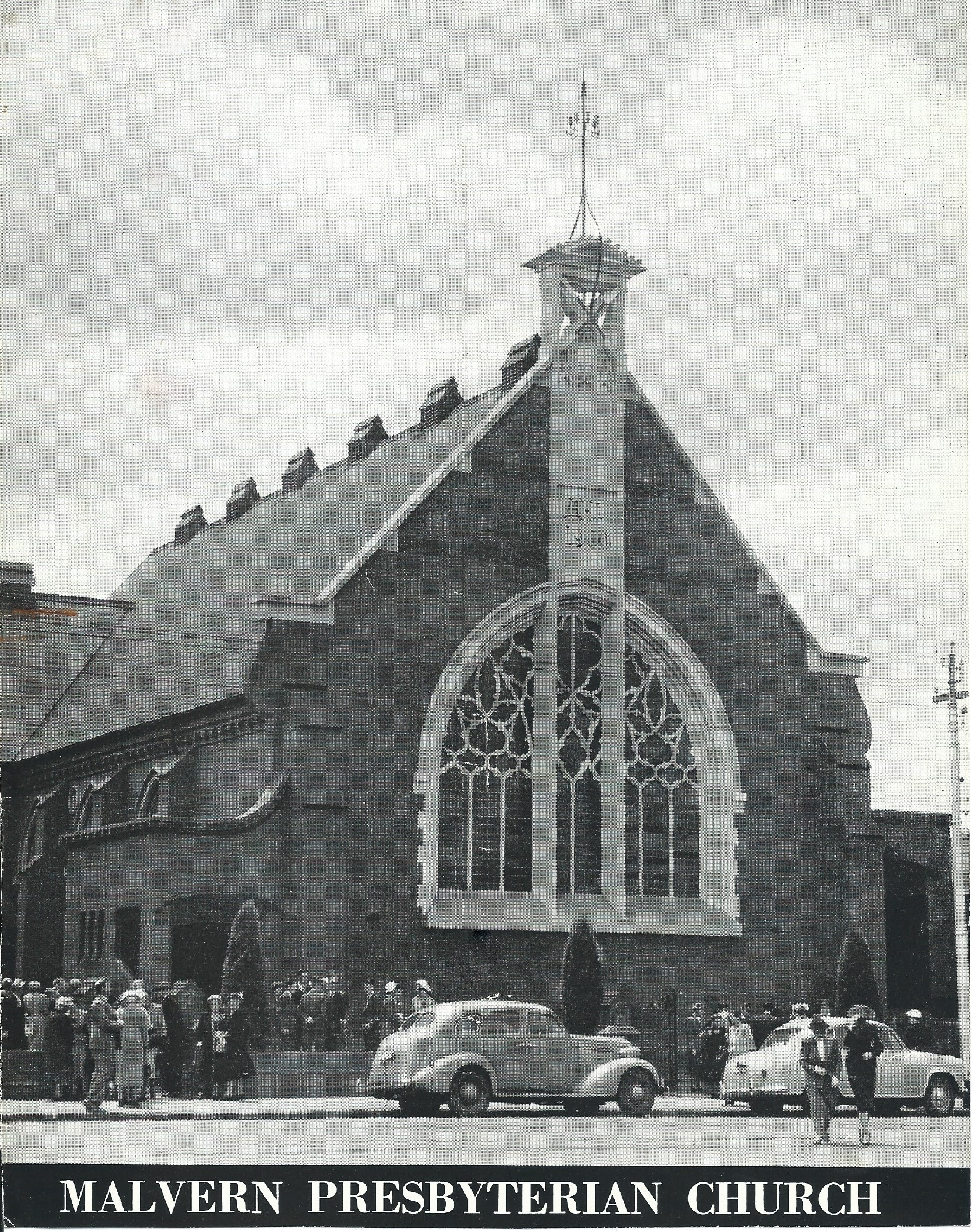
Commemorative booklet 1955.

The first of three Presbyterian churches designed by Haddon, this work, at 163 Wattletree Rd, Malvern was commissioned in 1904 and completed in 1906 demonstrating a restrained and dignified Art Nouveau treatment of a basic church form used by Reformed and Presbyterian congregations - a clear, light-filled, open space ideal for the spoken word - a modern and sophisticated treatment of the traditional Presbyterian preaching hall. Its basic Gothic cruciform footprint is broad and fits the full depth of the shallow site with seating for 500 in the wide Nave and short transepts with two entrance lobbies flanking the Wattletree Rd end of the nave, thus avoiding using up depth with a Narthex. A shallow Apse contains the organ pipes. Broad arched windows represent the most overt art nouveau element of the design with tracery reflecting vine-like interpretations of traditional Gothic fenestration. The similarities with St Stephens, Caulfield, built 20 years later, are striking, particularly the powerful cement column that divides the main façade symmetrically and draws the eye upwards to the apex of the gable and beyond. In this case, the gable is surmounted by an interesting combination of a saltire and thistle representing St Andrew's cross and Scotland. This, in turn, is mounted by a finial composed of eight wrought iron thistles. the interior and casing for the organ pipes were designed by Haddon as was most of the furniture, much of which continues the thistle and Satire motifs in various and sometimes extremely subtle forms. the addition of vine and acanthus leaves is seen in corbels for the hammer-beam roof and around the pulpit, which is placed off-centre to relieve space (possibly also reflecting doctrinal changes in Presbyterian churches at the time) and giving the communion table the focal point of the interior. Built at a cost of £4738 with an additional cost of £1800 for the George Fincham organ, this lavish church represents a complete vision of Robert Haddon's thesis of a "total work of art" treatment for his own congregation, being a short walk from his new house, Anselm. After World War I, Haddon was again commissioned to design a memorial to the fallen men of the congregation, most of whom he would have known personally.

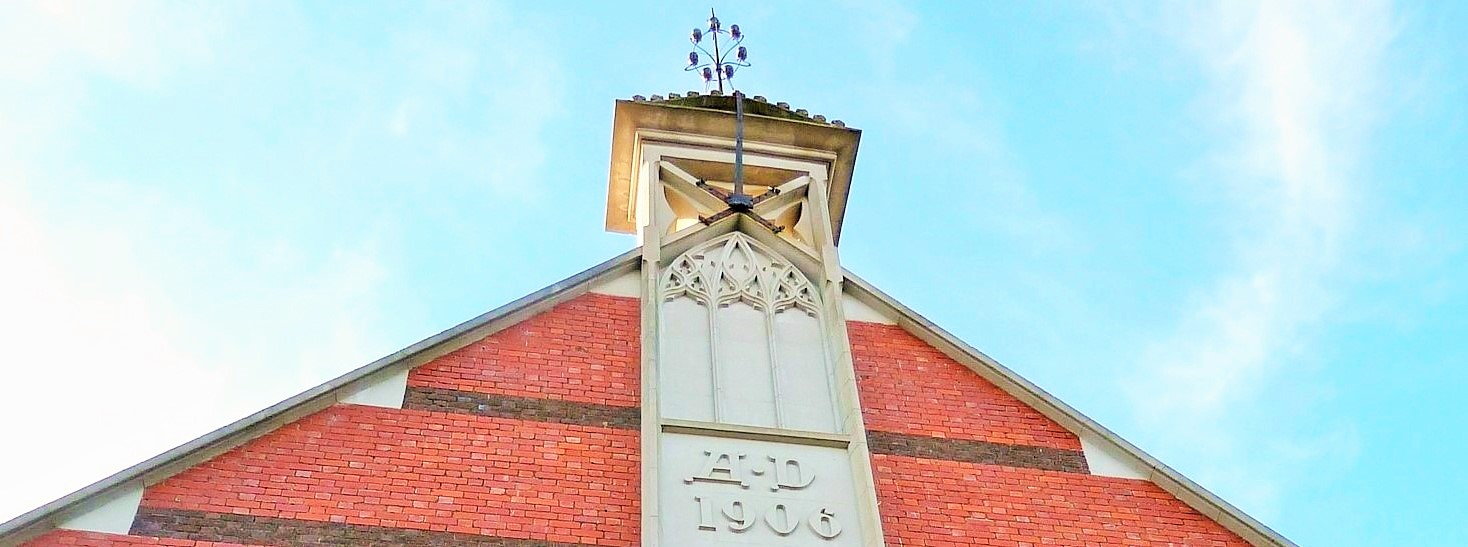
Malvern Presbyterian Church front gable and thistle finial

=== St Stephen's Church ===
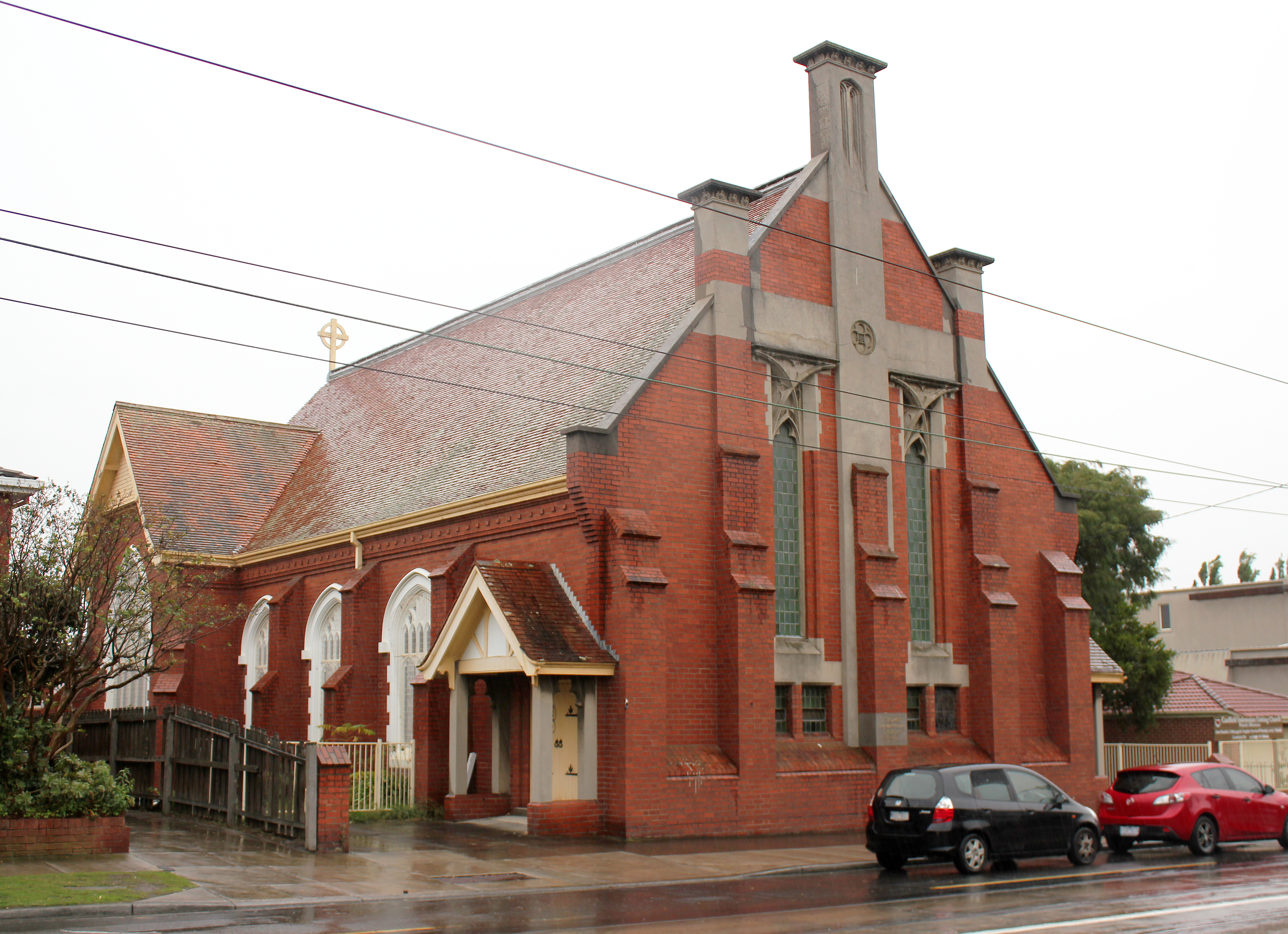
St Stephens Church Caulfield Nth

Built in 1926, Haddon's incorporation of the Arts and Crafts movement-style with the traditional Gothic style is evident in St Stephen's Church, known when built as St Stephen's Presbyterian Church, on Balaclava Road, Caulfield North. The fusion of styles marks a transition in Melbourne's church architecture, where the traditional proportions become reinvented through exterior and interior details. The outside of St. Stephens is softened by the use of red brick and stucco, with a striking cement cross that divides the façade symmetrically. Haddon also appropriates the verticality of gothic windows, dividing the internal space into smaller vertically stacked lead rectangles throughout. He repeated the Arts and Crafts movement approach to other church commissions he received, and this church remains significant in its close proximity to Haddon's own residence (Anselm).

=== The Archangel Michael and St Anthony's Coptic Orthodox Church, Oakleigh ===
Built in 1928 as St Andrew's Presbyterian, Oakleigh and designed by Haddon in cooperation with his business partner, William Henderson, this building confidently sits the corner of Drummond and Palmer Streets, Oakleigh. Short and squat with an octagonal castellated tower, the windows, brickwork and restrained adornment look decidedly "Haddonian" as Professor Miles Lewis AM of Melbourne University states in a 1991 National Trust of Victoria publication. While Professor Lewis goes on to describe the cantilevered wrought iron lamp over the entrance and a blind oculus in the western wall, he is clearly not a fan and calls the spire "risible". In Miles Lewis' words, an overall mannered and clumsy form. However, with the benefit of two and a half decades, tastes have moved on from Lewis' time to reassess this era of building. Similar to Malvern and St Stephen's, Caulfield, the Oakleigh church enjoys a cement gable treatment enhancing the focus on the apex, and proudly displaying the year of construction. The overall impression is coherent and pleasing in its suburban scale. Recent sympathetic additions have enhanced the facilities of this attractive campus but the Haddon building still sits the corner site well. Its presence shows a transition to the heavier, monolithic presence of the moderne and Art Deco of the 1920-30s. In this sense, Haddon carries forward his Arts and Crafts ideals but has left the gothic well behind and synthesized for the new architecture of the inter-war period.
