= Te Aho o Te Kura Pounamu =

- The Correspondence School
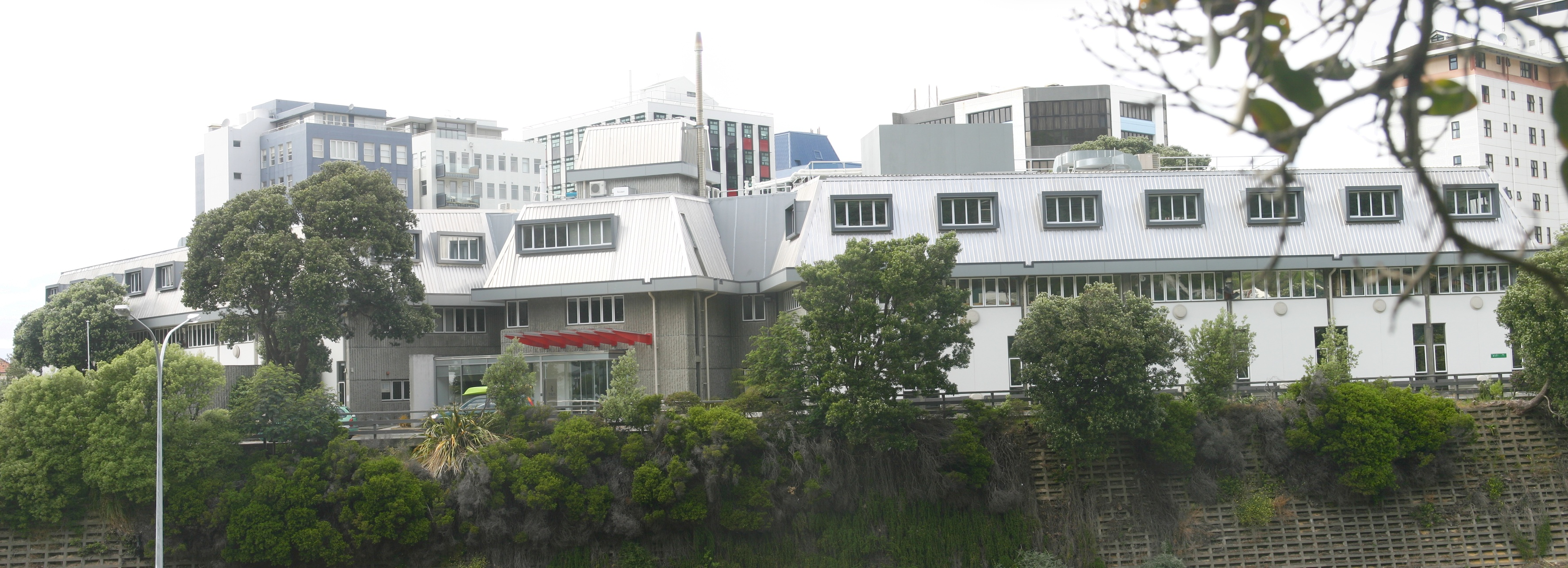
- View of Te Kura

Location
- Private Bag 39992, Wellington Mail Centre, Lower Hutt 5045; 11 Portland Crescent, Thorndon, Wellington, New Zealand; 41.2739°S 174.7766°E

Information
- Type: State co-ed correspondence school
- Established: 1922
- Ministry of Education Institution no.: 498
- Chief Executive Officer: Te Rina Leonard
- Enrolment: 28,000
- Socio-economic decile: not given by ERO
- Website: www.tekura.school.nz

Te Aho o Te Kura Pounamu or Te Kura (formerly The Correspondence School) is New Zealand's largest school with around 28,000 students enrolled each year, from early childhood to secondary level. It is headquartered in Portland Crescent in Thorndon, Wellington. In addition to its ordinary full-time students, Te Kura provides programmes to students at other state-owned schools where a subject is unavailable, and to adults. Te Kura is Ministry of Education funded.

== Early history ==
The school began in 1922 with 100 primary level students, expanding into secondary education in 1928 with 50 students and into early childhood education in 1976. When the school was first established in the 1920s, parliamentarians referred to the founding vision as "a school for the benefit of the most isolated children, for example of lighthouse keepers and remote shepherds living upon small islands or in mountainous districts". The same parliamentary debate on TCS also described it as "a school of last resort, ensuring that no matter where he lived every child should have as full an education as he was capable of achieving".

== Recent developments ==
The school began a significant review of its services under the leadership of Debbie Francis (CEO January 2004 – July 2006) during which time the school was restructured. A $6 million annual deficit was corrected primarily through reducing the number of salaried staff – amongst other strategies. Further to this, the school developed a Differentiated Services Model for its full-time students.

Mike Hollings commenced in the position of CEO from August 2006 after completing a contract as the CEO of New Zealand Education Review Office (ERO). Further restructuring was undertaken at the end of 2007 when the school commenced the adoption of a more regionally focused model.

== Notable staff ==
- Arthur Gordon Butchers (1885–1960), principal, educationalist and historian
- Louise Henderson (1902–1994), artist and painter
- Trish McKelvey (born 1942), former cricketer, cricket administrator, and educator
- Apirana Mahuika (1934–2015), Māori tribal leader
- Te Paekiomeka Joy Ruha (1931–2011), prominent Māori leader and teacher

== Notable alumni ==
- Courtney McGregor (born 1998), representative artistic gymnast
- Nico Porteous (born 2001), represented New Zealand and won bronze at the 2018 Winter Olympics in Pyeongchang.
- Miguel Porteous (born 1999) represented New Zealand at the 2018 Winter Olympics in Pyeongchang.
- Joan Robb (c. 1921 – 2017), New Zealand herpetologist
