= Arthur Butchers =

New Zealand school principal, educationalist, historian

Arthur Gordon Butchers OBE (11 February 1885 – 21 April 1960) was a New Zealand principal, educationalist and historian. He was born in Brunswick, Victoria, Australia, on 11 February 1885.

In the 1947 New Year Honours, Butchers was appointed an Officer of the Order of the British Empire in recognition of his service as headmaster of The Correspondence School.
