= Arthur Dean (judge) =

Australian judge (1893–1970)

Sir Arthur Dean, QC (25 May 1893 – 25 September 1970) was an Australian lawyer, noteworthy as a Justice of the Supreme Court of Victoria and Chancellor of the University of Melbourne.

== Early life and education ==
Dean was born in Merino, Victoria and educated at Scotch College, Melbourne. After school he won an exhibition to the University of Melbourne where he obtained an LL.B. and LL.M. He was later awarded honorary LL.D. degrees by the University of Melbourne and the University of Western Australia.

== Career ==
Dean was appointed King's Counsel in March 1944 and became a Justice of the Supreme Court of Victoria in 1949 where he continued as a judge until 1965.

Dean gave much service to the University of Melbourne, including as a Lecturer in Equity (1929–39), member of Council (1950-1969), Deputy-Chancellor (1953–54) and Chancellor (1954-66).

Dean was an elder of the Malvern Presbyterian Church, Melbourne and was Chairman of the Council of Presbyterian Ladies' College, Melbourne. He was knighted in 1960.

Upon Dean's retirement from the Supreme Court of Victoria in May 1965, the Bar Council of the Victorian Bar "entrusted" Dean with "the compilation of materials" about the Victorian Bar's history and the writing of a book about the Victorian Bar, which was published in 1968 under the title A Multitude of Counsellors - A History of the Victorian Bar.

== Death ==
Dean died in East Melbourne, Victoria, Australia on 25 September 1970, survived by his wife and two daughters.

Academic offices
Preceded by Sir Charles John Lowe	Chancellor of the University of Melbourne; 1954–1966	Succeeded by Sir William Upjohn
