= William George Dismore Upjohn =

Australian surgeon (1888–1979)

Sir William George Dismore Upjohn, OBE (16 March 1888 – 18 January 1979) was a noted Australian surgeon. From Narrabri in New South Wales, he received his medical education at the University of Melbourne where he was resident at Ormond College and served at Royal Melbourne Hospital before entering private practice. A lieutenant-colonel within the Australian Army Medical Corps during World War I, he served in the Gallipoli campaign, investigating a dysentery epidemic, before being transferred to France in 1916. He was twice mentioned in dispatches.

After his discharge he joined the Royal College of Surgeons and resumed duties as a surgeon and general practitioner in Melbourne. He helped found the Royal Australasian College of Surgeons, and was a member of medical committees during World War II working to coordinate medical matters for the armed forces. He was also Chancellor of the University of Melbourne between 1966 and 1967.

Academic offices
Preceded by Sir Arthur Dean	Chancellor of the University of Melbourne; 1966–1967	Succeeded by Sir Robert Menzies
