= Bank of New South Wales building, Melbourne =

Buildings in Melbourne, Victoria, Australia

Bank of New South Wales building
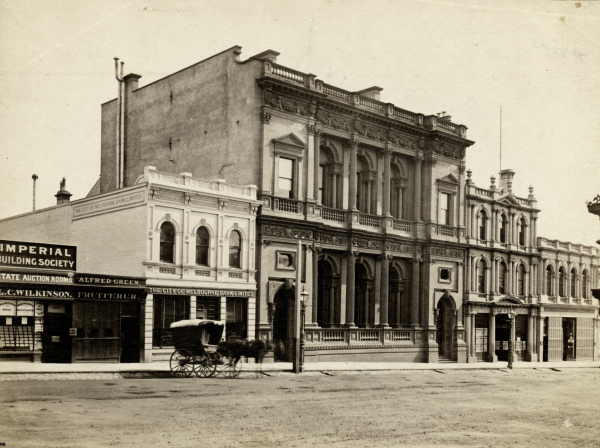
- The former two-storey building, c. 1870, at 55 Collins Street (West)

General information
- Type: Offices
- Architectural style: Renaissance Revival
- Location: 55 Collins Street West, Melbourne central business district, Victoria, Australia
- Coordinates: 37°48′59″S 144°57′44″E
- Completed: 1857
- Demolished: 1932
- Owner: Bank of New South Wales

Design and construction
- Architect: Joseph Reed

The Bank of New South Wales buildings, Melbourne refers to two former state head office buildings for the Bank of New South Wales, that were located at the same location (Note: 55 Collins Street West was later renumbered as 368–374 Collins Street.) on Collins Street, in the Melbourne central business district, in Victoria, Australia.

The first structure, built in 1856–1857, located at what was called 55 Collins Street (West), was demolished in 1932 and its original Renaissance Revival façade was relocated to The University of Melbourne.

The second structure, built in 1933–1936, located at the same site, known as 368–374 Collins Street, was demolished in the 1970s.

== 55 Collins Street West ==
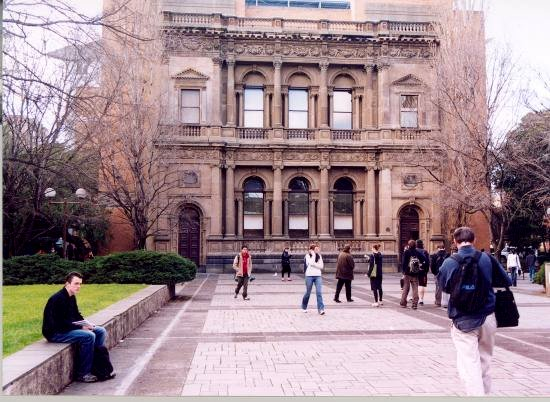
The façade relocated from 55 Collins Street West to the University of Melbourne

Drawing showing dual-level façade of 55 Collins Street West building

The first building was designed by prolific Melbourne architect Joseph Reed who was awarded first prize, worth £75, in the competition initiated by the Bank of New South Wales to design their new Melbourne headquarters on a vacant block of land facing the prominent Criterion Hotel. Reed's design was chosen for its extensive use of ornamentation on the relatively small scale building.

Reed believed that the style of a building should match its function, and though his designs were rarely directly informed by existing buildings, his Bank of New South Wales building is a copy of Jacopo Sansovino’s Biblioteca Marciana in St Mark’s Square in Venice. Reed chose Sansovino’s library due to the building’s style and evocation of merchant activity and the function of banking that was central to the city and society in Renaissance Italy.

The intricate, dual-level façade is prized as a leading example of mid-nineteenth century Renaissance Revival architecture in Melbourne. The lower level of the façade consists of capped columns in the Ionic order with fluted scamozzi capitals. These lower columns sit upon carved stone pedestals held in place by rusticated blue-stone plinths. On the upper level of the façade fluted Corinthian columns are crowned with an ornate entablature. The upper frieze is decorated with nude figures holding flowers and fruits, while the lower half contains ornamented wreaths carved in place by sculptor Charles Summers.

Both levels of the façade consist of five vertical bays. At street level two of these bays contain the tall timber entrance doors. The left entrance originally led directly to the main banking hall, while the right entrance led to the manager's private residence. Three center window bays are recessed behind the classical columns. Balustrading in front of each window creates balconies and provides privacy to the reception rooms within.

=== Preservation of the facade ===
Bank of New South Wales building
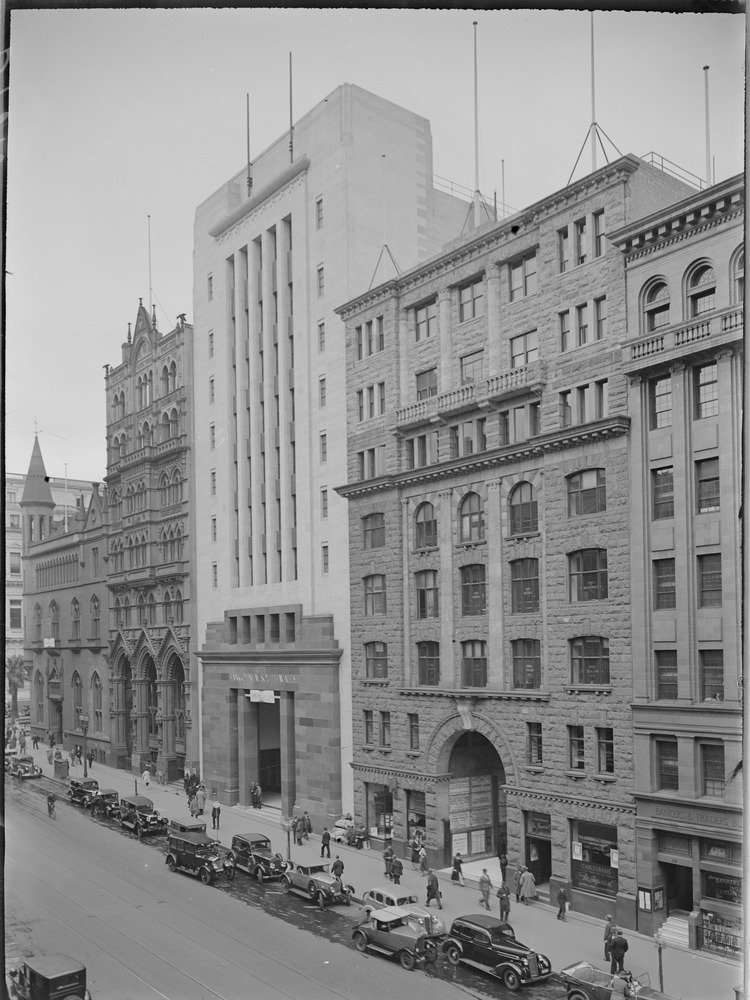
- The former ten-storey building (middle) at 368–374 Collins Street

General information
- Type: Offices
- Architectural style: Art Deco
- Location: 368–374 Collins St, Melbourne, Australia
- Coordinates: 37°48′58″S 144°57′44″E
- Completed: 1936
- Demolished: 1970s
- Owner: Bank of New South Wales

Technical details
- Floor count: 10

Design and construction
- Architecture firm: Godfrey and Spowers

Internal structural problems were discovered as early as 1861, just four years after initial construction was completed. In 1885 architect William Salway of Reed & Barnes was commissioned to undertake extensive restoration of the building. When Reed was questioned about the structural integrity of the building he responded, “At the time there was no iron to be had in the colony. Some stone arches and columns were removed by order of the management, and timber substituted; dry rot got into it, and the thing failed". Eventually, the continuing decay of both the interior and façade coupled with the need to expand culminated in the final decision to demolish the building in 1932 to make way for a newer, larger design.

Reed's original façade was preserved before demolition and gifted by the Bank of New South Wales to the University of Melbourne and erected on university grounds in 1938 as the frontage for a new home for the School of Commerce. The façade was added to a non-statutory heritage list by the Victorian branch of the National Trust on 17 July 1958. In the 2010s, the supporting building and the 1960s Architecture Building behind were demolished, and the facade incorporated into the new Melbourne School of Design, completed in 2014, opposite Union Lawn.

== 368–374 Collins Street ==
In 1933 architects Godfrey and Spowers were chosen to design new premises for the Bank of New South Wales to be built on the same site, known as 368–374 Collins Street. The ten-storey Art Deco design was completed in 1936 and won the Street Architecture Medal in the same year. It was demolished in the mid-1970s for Collins Wales House, located at 360 Collins Street.

== See also ==
- Architecture of Melbourne
- List of demolished buildings and structures in Melbourne
