= Queen Anne style architecture =

Architectural style

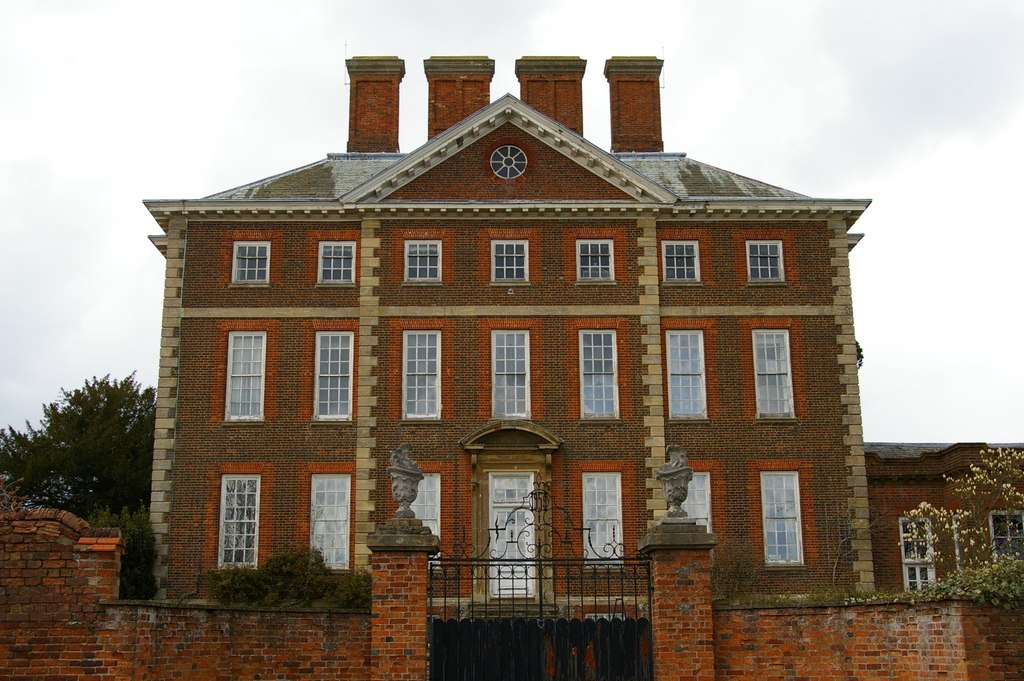
Winslow Hall in Buckinghamshire (1700), possibly by Christopher Wren, has most of the typical features of the original English style.

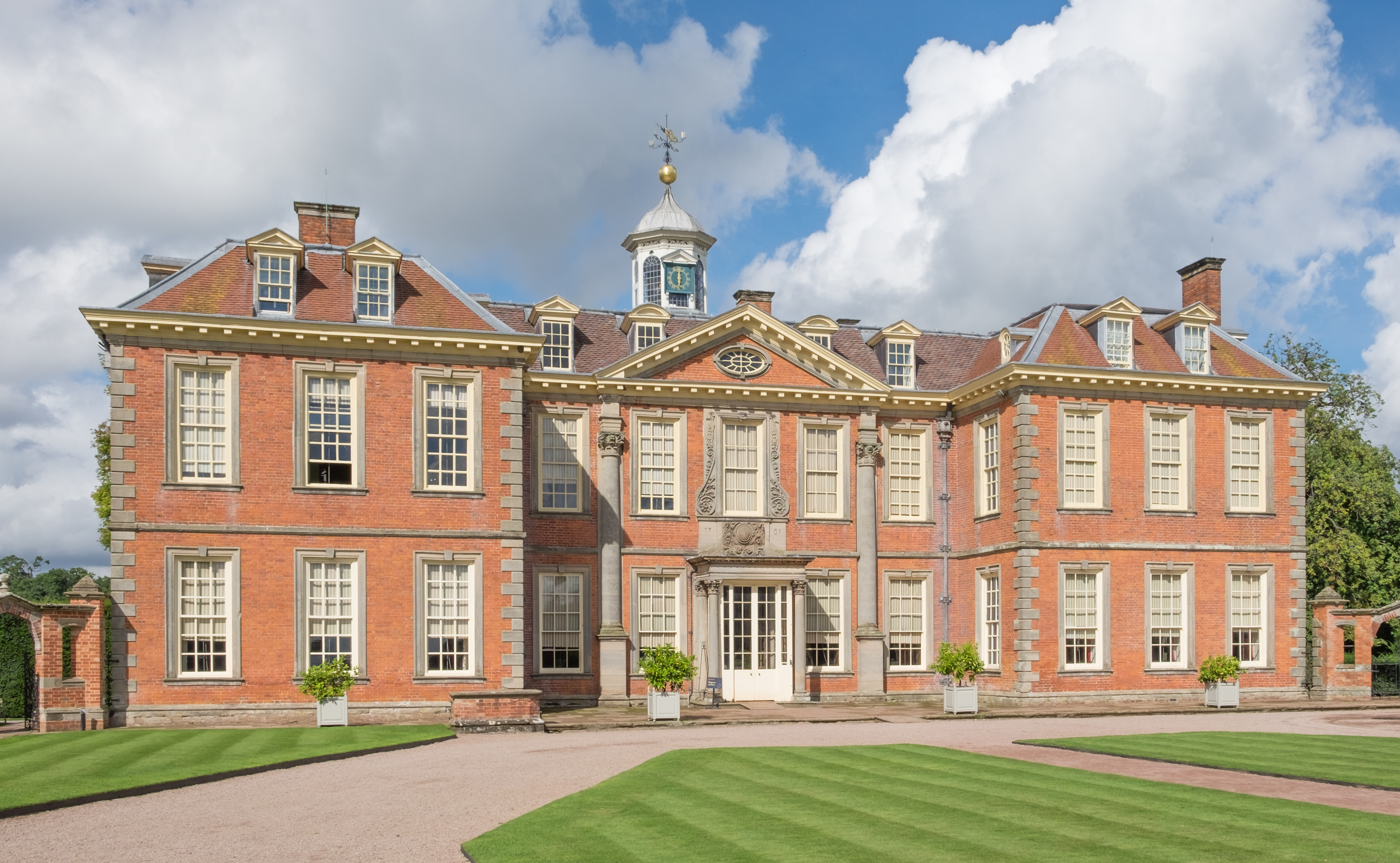
Hanbury Hall in Worcestershire (c. 1706) is about as large a building as is found in the English Queen Anne style.

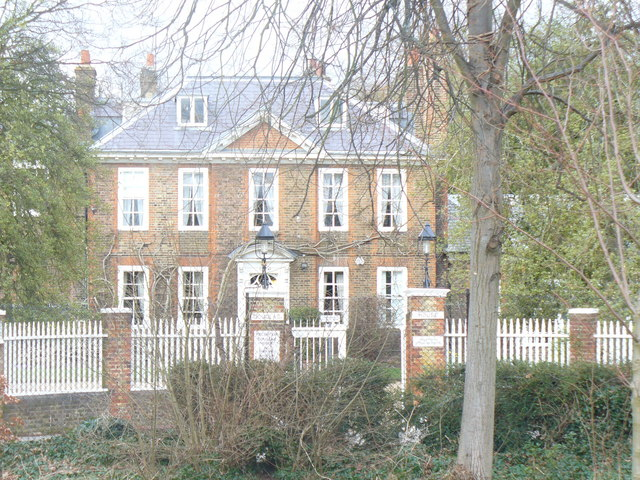
Douglas House, Petersham, early 18th century

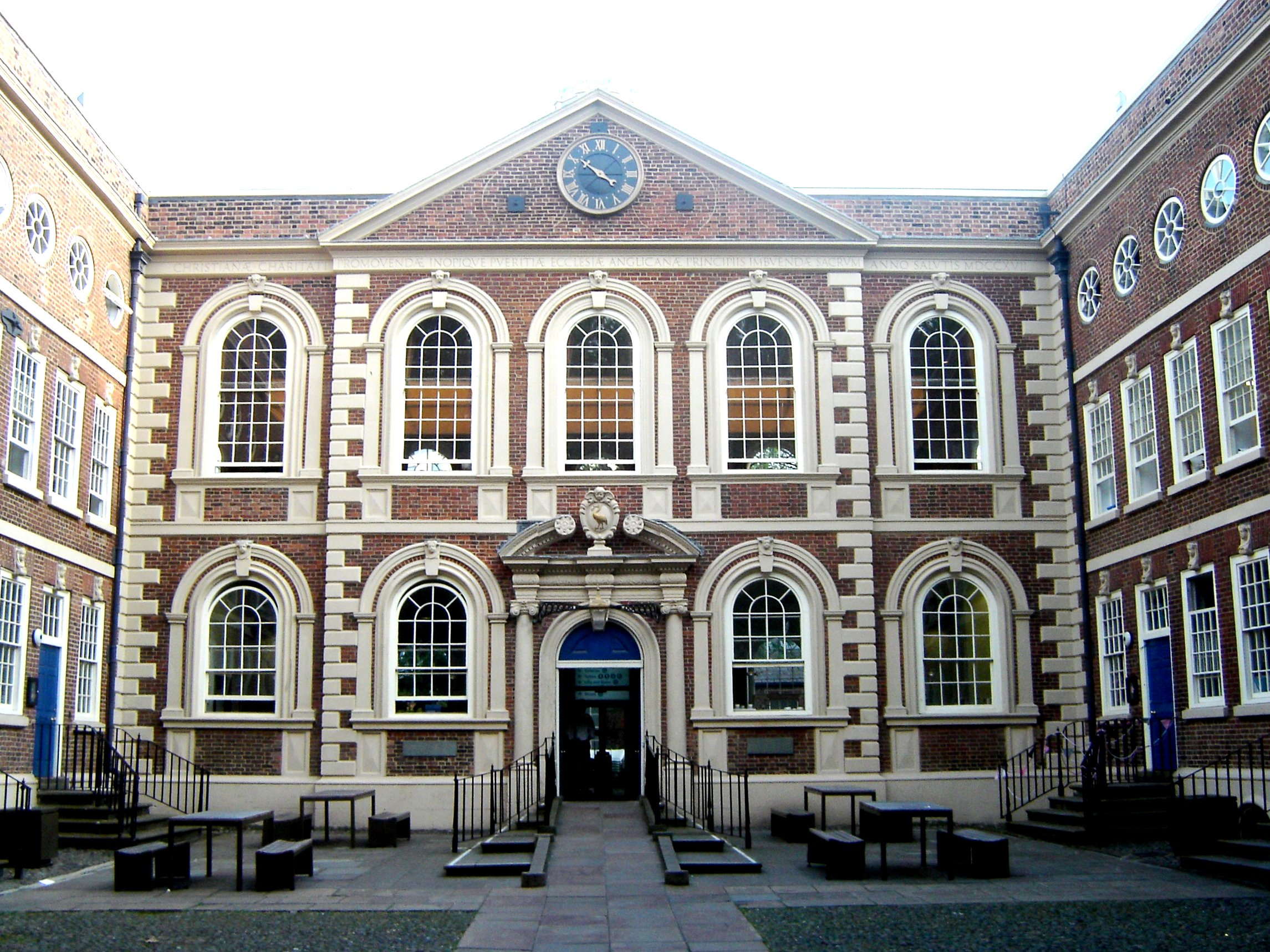
Bluecoat Chambers in Liverpool (1717), in a version of the original Queen Anne style

The Queen Anne style of British architecture refers to either the English Baroque architecture of the time of Queen Anne (who reigned from 1702 to 1714) or the British Queen Anne Revival form that became popular during the last quarter of the 19th century and the early decades of the 20th century. In other English-speaking parts of the world, New World Queen Anne Revival architecture embodies entirely different styles.

== Overview ==
With respect to British architecture, the term is mostly used for domestic buildings up to the size of a manor house, and usually designed elegantly but simply by local builders or architects rather than the grand palaces of noble magnates. The term is not often used for churches. Contrary to the American usage of the term, it is characterised by strongly bilateral symmetry, with an Italianate or Palladian-derived pediment on the front formal elevation.

Colours were made to contrast with carefully chosen red brick for the walls, with details in a lighter stone that is often rather richly carved. Christopher Wren used this technique, which achieved a rich effect for a considerably lower cost than using stone as a facing throughout, in his rebuilding of Hampton Court Palace, commissioned by William and Mary. Here, it harmonized well with the remaining Tudor parts of the palace. This highly visible example probably influenced many others.

The architectural historian Marcus Binney, writing in The Times in 2006, describes Poulton House in Poulton, Wiltshire (built in 1706, during the reign of Queen Anne) as "...Queen Anne at its most delightful". Binney lists what he describes as the typical features of the Queen Anne style:

- a sweep of steps leading to a carved stone door-case
- rows of painted sash windows in boxes set flush with the brickwork
- stone quoins emphasizing corners
- a central triangular pediment set against a hipped roof with dormers
- typically box-like "double pile" plans, two rooms deep

When using the revived "Queen Anne style" of the 19th and 20th centuries, the historical reference in the name should not be taken at all literally, as buildings said to be in the "Queen Anne style" in other parts of the English-speaking world normally bear even less resemblance to English buildings of the early 18th century than those of any style of revival architecture to the original. In particular, Queen Anne style architecture in the United States is a wholly different style, as in Australia, and normally includes no elements typical of the actual architecture of Queen Anne's reign, the names being devised for marketing purposes.

== British Queen Anne Revival ==
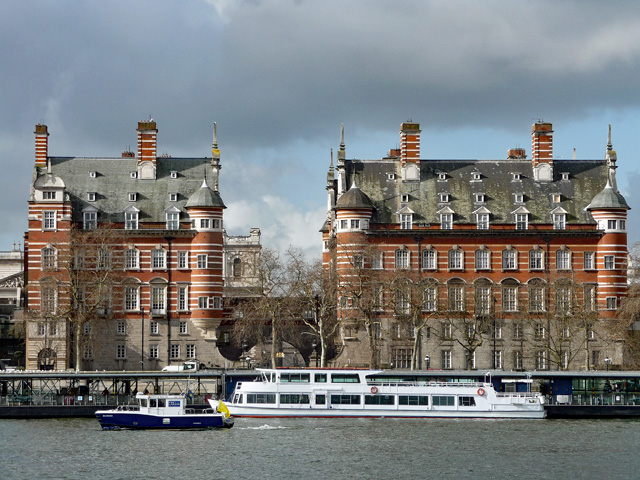
Norman Shaw Buildings, London

George Devey (1820–1886) and the better-known Norman Shaw (1831–1912) popularized the Queen Anne style of British architecture of the industrial age in the 1870s. Norman Shaw published a book of architectural sketches as early as 1858, and his evocative pen-and-ink drawings began to appear in trade journals and artistic magazines in the 1870s. American commercial builders quickly adopted the style.

Shaw's eclectic designs often included Tudor elements, and this "Old English" style also became popular in the United States, where it became known (inaccurately) as the Queen Anne style. Confusion between buildings constructed during the reign of Queen Anne and the "Queen Anne" style persists, especially in England.

British Victorian Queen Anne architecture empathises more closely with the Arts and Crafts movement than its American counterpart. A good example is Severalls Hospital in Colchester, Essex (1913–1997), which is now defunct.

The historical precedents of the architectural style were broad and several:

- fine brickwork, often in a warmer, softer finish than the Victorians characteristically used, varied with terracotta panels or tile-hung upper storeys, with crisply-painted white woodwork or blond limestone detailing
- oriel windows, often stacked one above another
- corner towers
- asymmetrical fronts and picturesque massing
- Flemish mannerist sunken panels of strapwork
- deeply shadowed entrances
- broad porches
- overall, a domesticated free Renaissance style

In the 20th century, Edwin Lutyens and others used an elegant version of the style, usually with red-brick walls contrasting with pale stone details.

== New World Queen Anne Revival ==
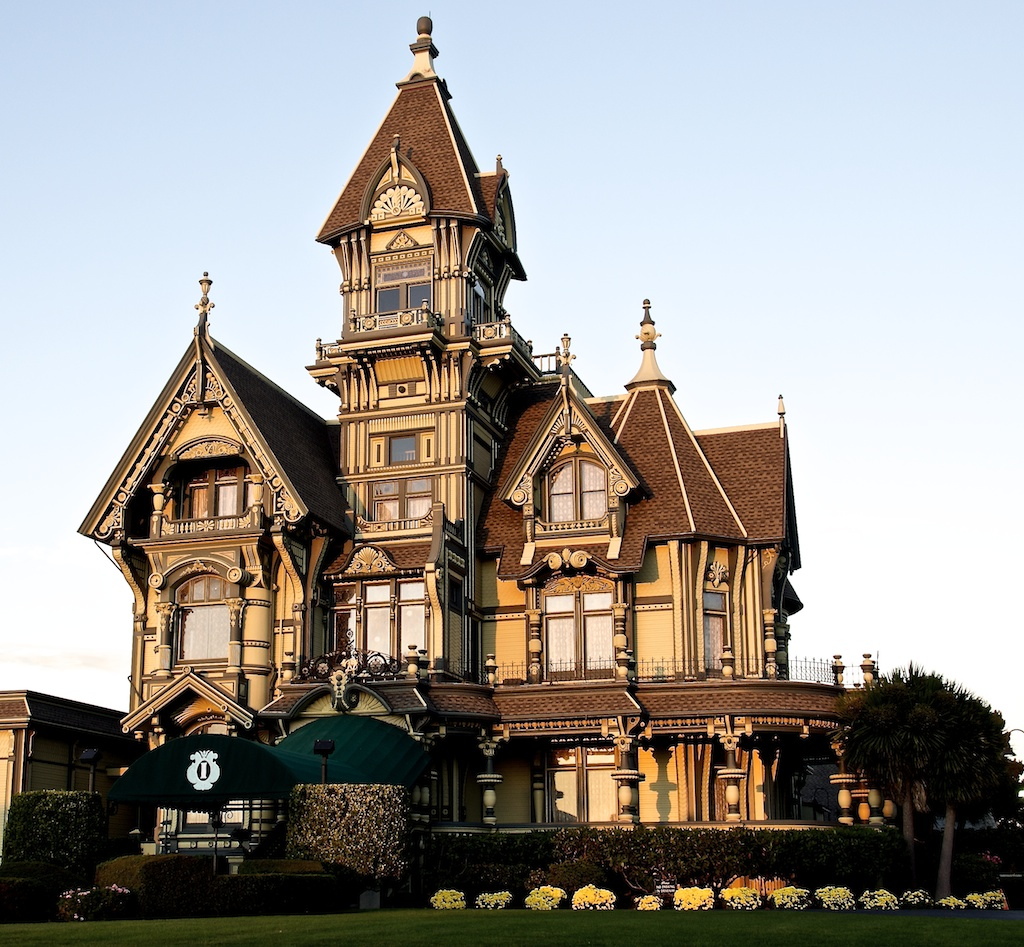
The Carson Mansion, located in Eureka, California, is widely considered to be one of the most extreme examples of American Queen Anne style.

=== United States ===
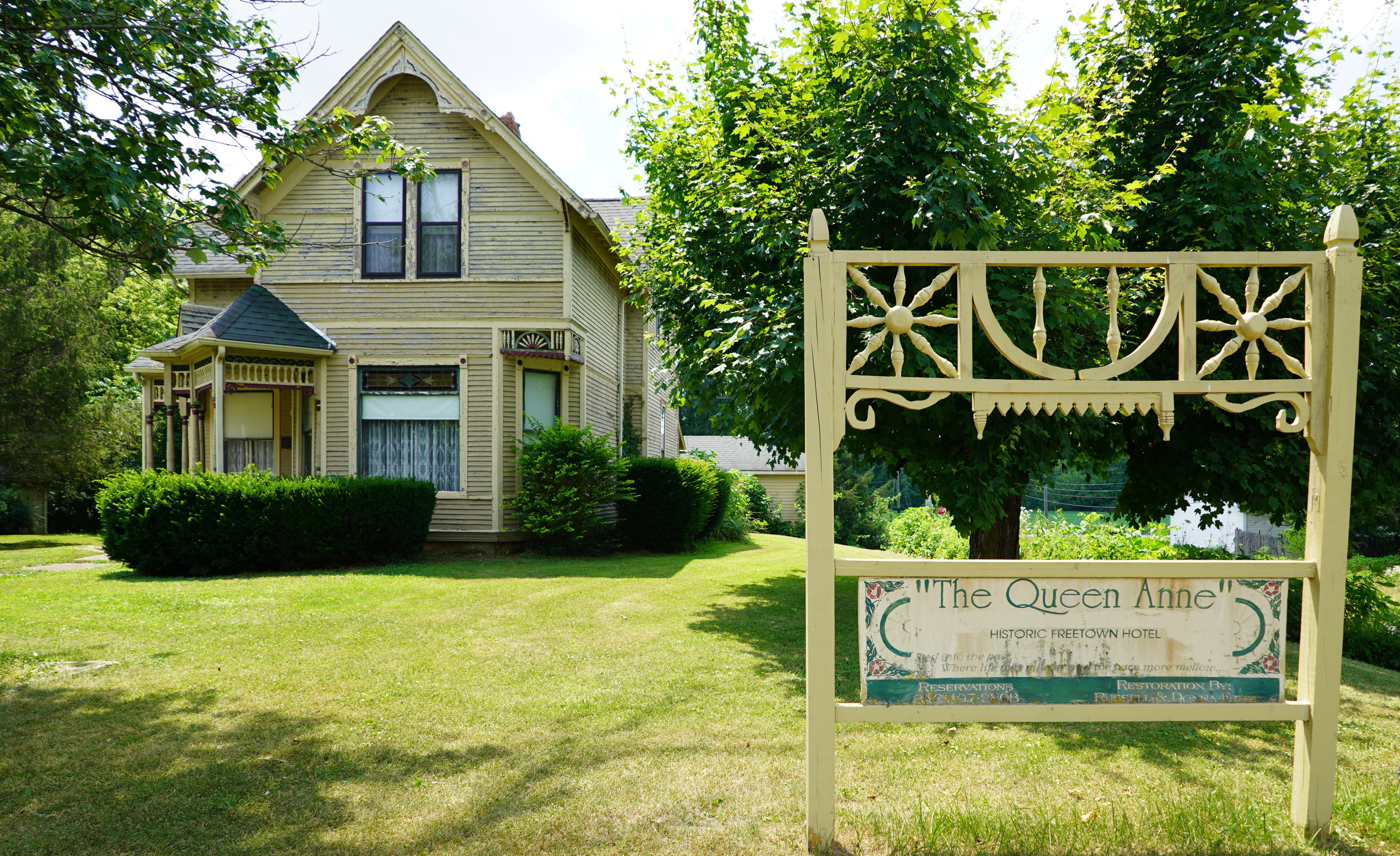
American Queen Anne style Frank Wheeler Hotel in Freetown, Indiana

In the United States, "Queen Anne" is used to describe a wide range of picturesque buildings with "free Renaissance" (non-Gothic Revival architecture) details and as an alternative both to the French-derived Second Empire and the less "domestic" Beaux-Arts architecture, is broadly applied to architecture, furniture, and decorative arts of the period 1880 to 1910; some "Queen Anne" architectural elements, such as the wraparound front porch, continued to be found into the 1920s. One example of a Queen Anne style home in the United States is the Slowe-Burrill House located in the Brookland neighborhood of Washington D.C.

The gabled and domestically scaled style arrived in New York City with the new housing for the New York House and School of Industry Sidney V. Stratton, architect, 1878. Distinctive features of American Queen Anne architecture may include an asymmetrical façade; dominant front-facing gable, often cantilevered beyond the plane of the wall below; overhanging eaves; round, square, or polygonal tower(s); shaped and Dutch gables; a porch covering part or all of the front façade, including the primary entrance area; a second-story porch or balconies; pedimented porches; differing wall textures, such as patterned wood shingles shaped into varying designs, including resembling fish scales, terra cotta tiles, relief panels, or wooden shingles over brickwork, etc.; dentils; classical columns; spindle work; oriel and bay windows; horizontal bands of leaded windows; monumental chimneys; painted balustrades; and wooden or slate roofs. Front gardens often had wooden fences.

=== Australia ===
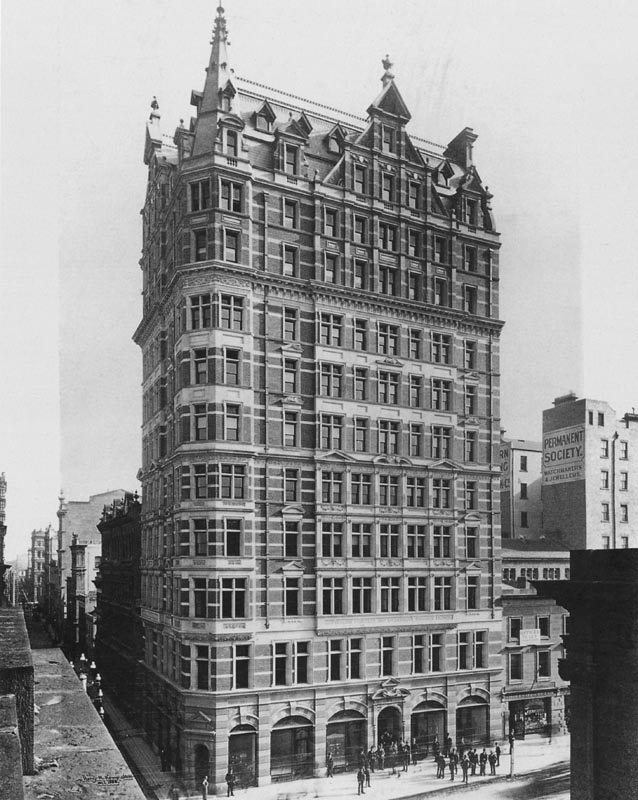
The APA Building in Melbourne, Australia, circa 1900. It was Australia's tallest building from its completion in 1889 to 1912 and was demolished in 1980.

In Australia the influence of Richard Norman Shaw contributed to the development of the Federation style, of which the heyday lasted from 1890 to 1915, and which is subdivided into twelve phases, Federation Queen Anne being one and the most popular style for houses built between 1890 and 1910. The style often used Tudor-style woodwork and elaborate fretwork that replaced the Victorian taste for wrought iron. Verandahs were usually a feature, as were the image of the rising sun and Australian wildlife, plus circular windows, turrets, and towers with conical or pyramid-shaped roofs.

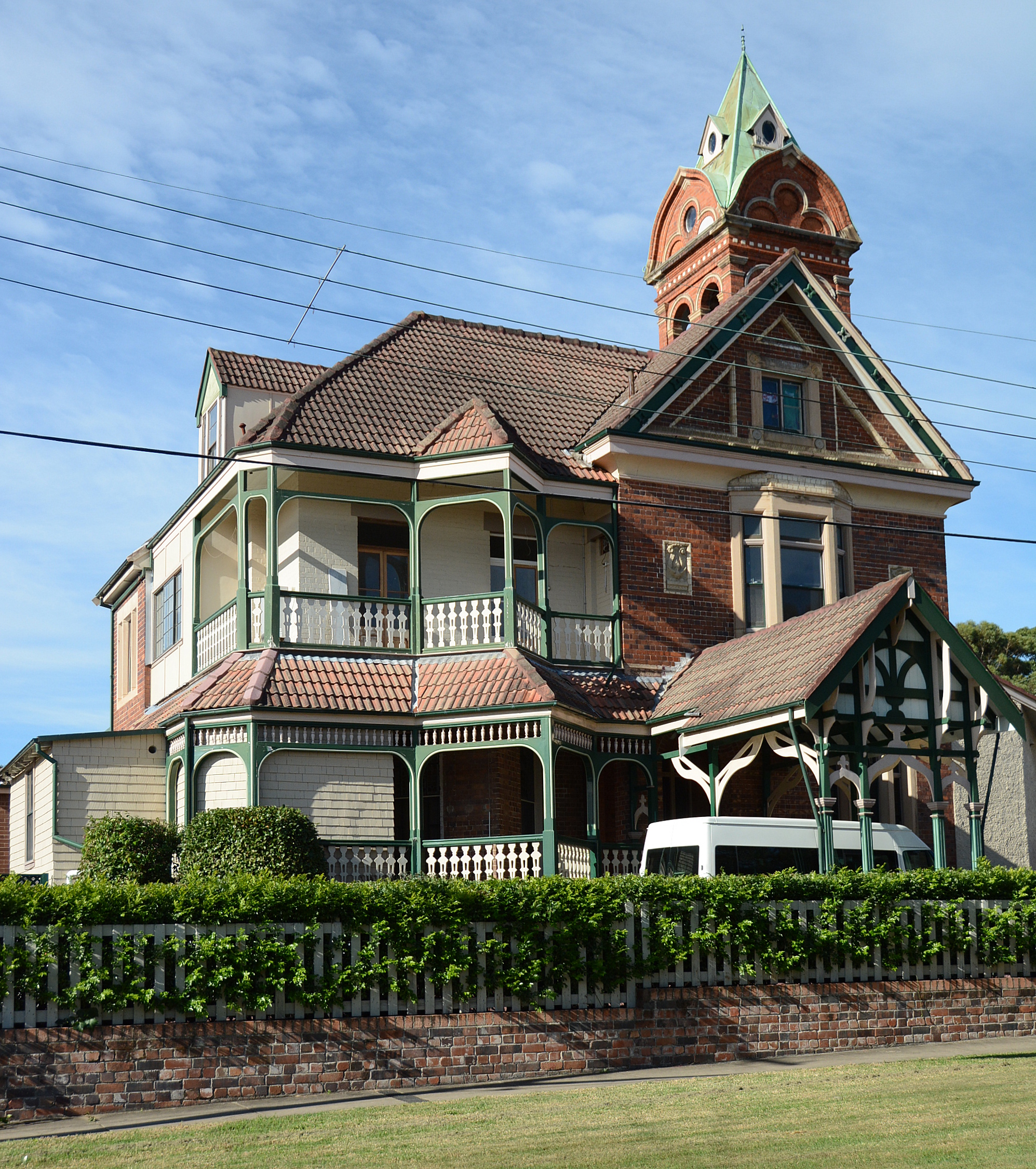
Amesbury a Queen Anne Style house in Ashfield, Sydney

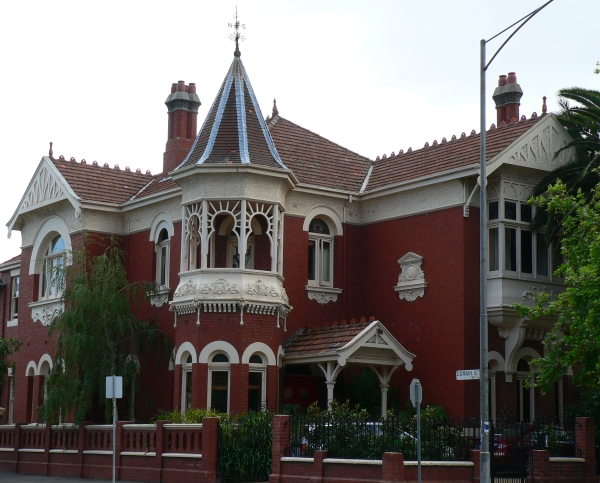
Queen Anne styled mansion located in South Yarra, Melbourne

The first Queen Anne house in Australia was Caerleon in the suburb of Bellevue Hill, Sydney. Caerleon was designed initially by a Sydney architect, Harry Kent, but was then substantially reworked in London by Maurice Adams. This led to some controversy over who deserved the credit. The house was built in 1885 and was the precursor for the Federation Queen Anne house that was to become so popular. The APA Building in the Melbourne central business district was an example of the Queen Anne style being used for non-residential purposes. However, at some stage, the building may have been apartments. It was demolished in 1981 after the modernism boom in Melbourne took off – factors that sealed its demolition included rapacious development, lax heritage attitudes in Australian cities, and the owner's decision to argue for a demolition permit, which was granted.

Caerleon was followed soon after by West Maling, in the suburb of Penshurst, New South Wales, and Annesbury, in the suburb of Ashfield, both built circa 1888. Although built around the same time, these houses had distinct styles, West Maling displaying a robust Tudor influence that was not present in Annesbury. The style became increasingly popular, appealing predominantly to reasonably well-off people with an "Establishment" leaning.

The style as it developed in Australia was highly eclectic, blending Queen Anne elements with various Australian influences. Old English characteristics like ribbed chimneys and gabled roofs were combined with Australian aspects like encircling verandahs, designed to keep the sun out. One outstanding example of this eclectic approach is Urrbrae House, in the Adelaide suburb of Urrbrae, part of the Waite Institute. Another variation connected to the Federation Queen Anne style was the Federation Bungalow, featuring extended verandahs. This style generally incorporated familiar Queen Anne elements, but usually in simplified form.

Some prominent examples are:

- West Maling, corner of Penshurst Avenue and King Georges Road, Penshurst, Sydney
- Homes, Appian Way, Burwood, Sydney
- Homes, Haberfield, Sydney
- Caerleon, 15 Ginahgulla Road, Bellevue Hill, Sydney
- Annesbury, 78 Alt Street, Ashfield, Sydney
- Weld Club, Barrack Street, Perth
- ANZ Bank, Queens Parade, Fitzroy North, Melbourne
- Campion College, Studley Park Road, Kew, Melbourne
- Redcourt Estate, Armadale, Melbourne
- Tay Creggan, Hawthorn, Melbourne

=== Gallery ===
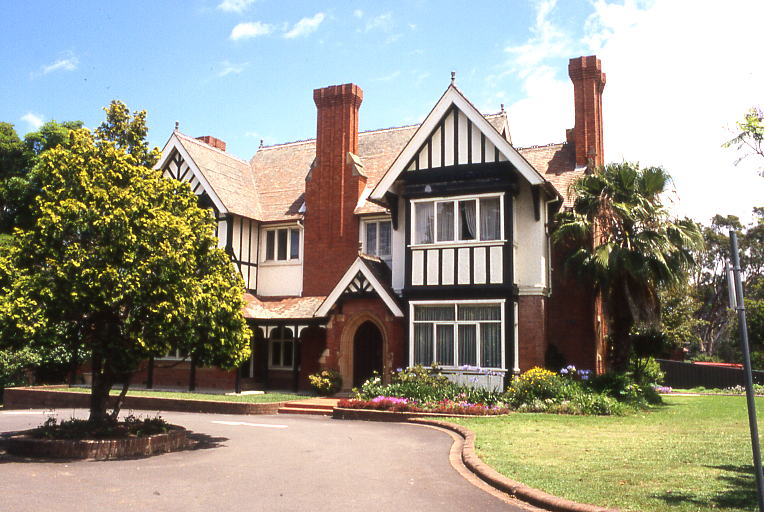
West Maling, Penshurst, New South Wales (NSW)

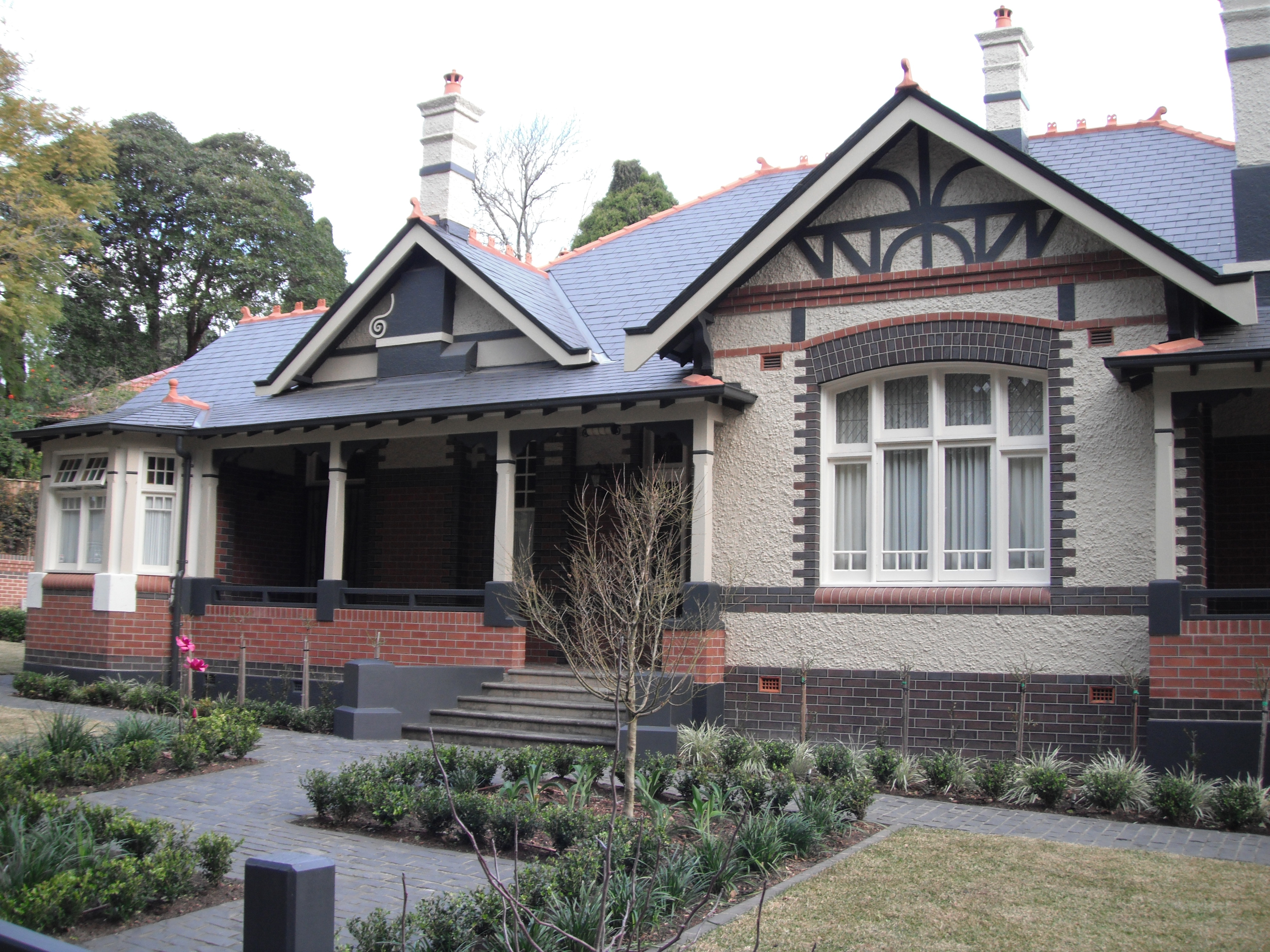
'Amalfi', 2 Appian Way, Burwood, NSW

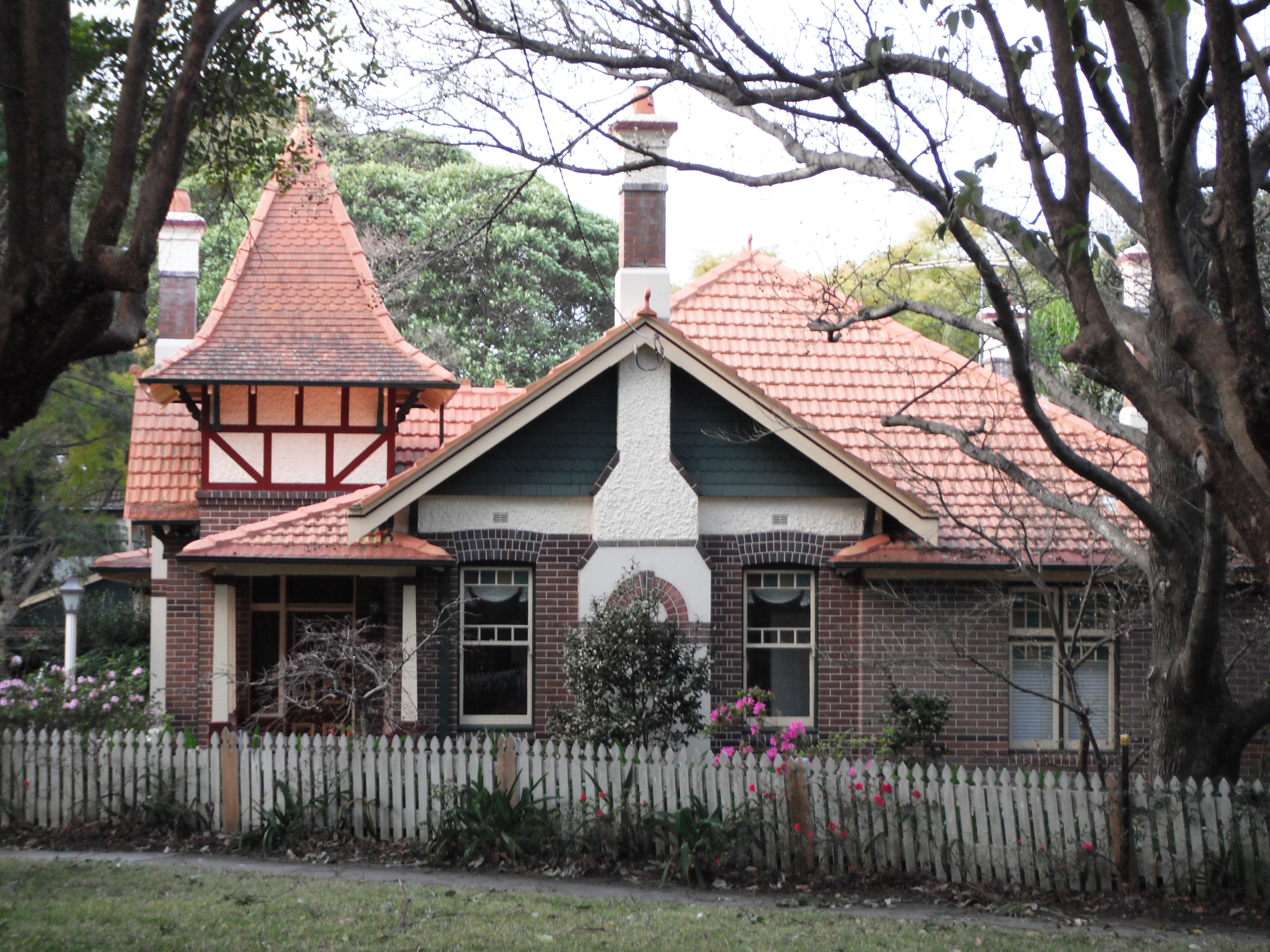
'Vallambrosa', 19 Appian Way, Burwood, NSW

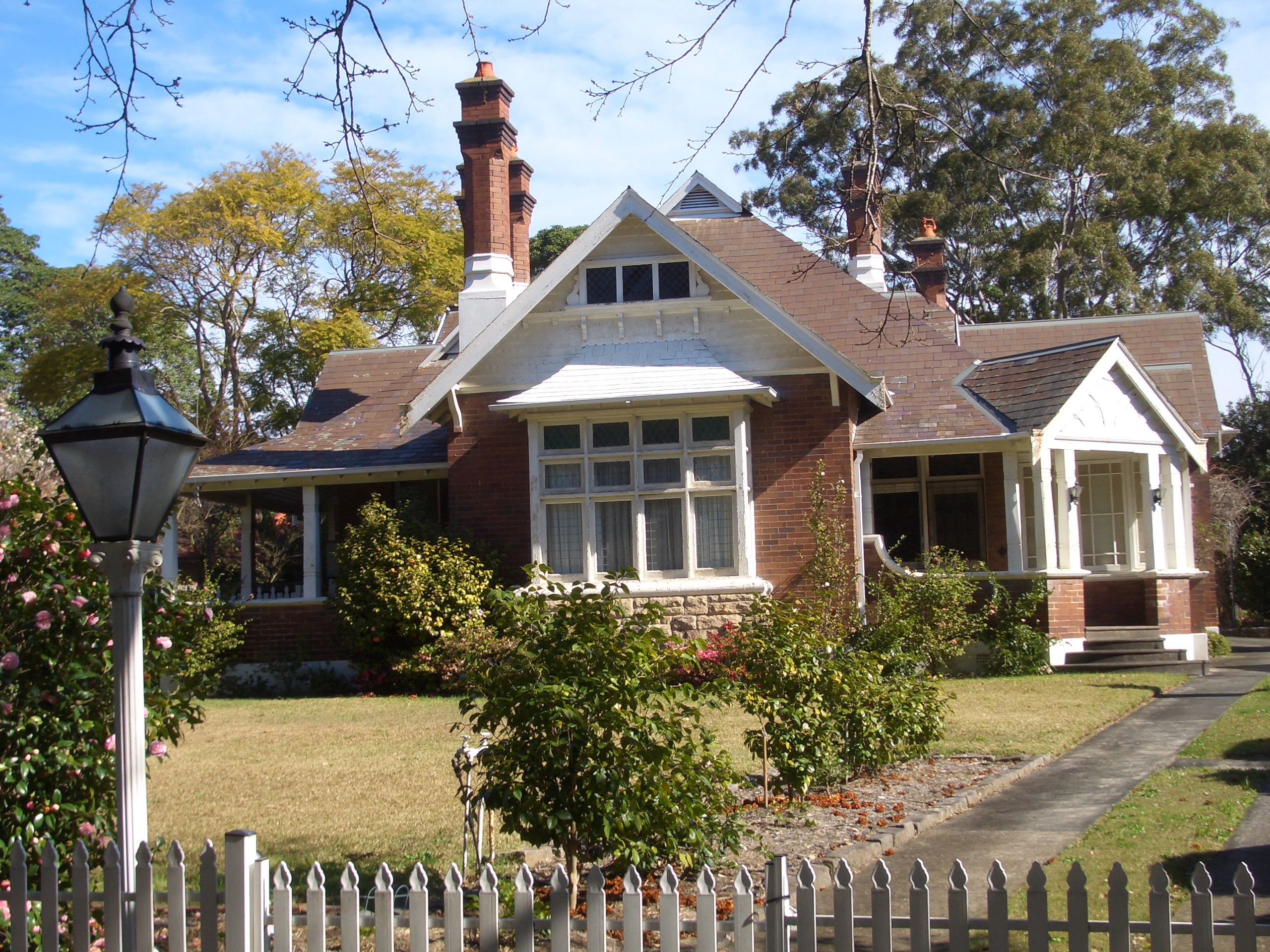
Appian Way, Burwood, NSW

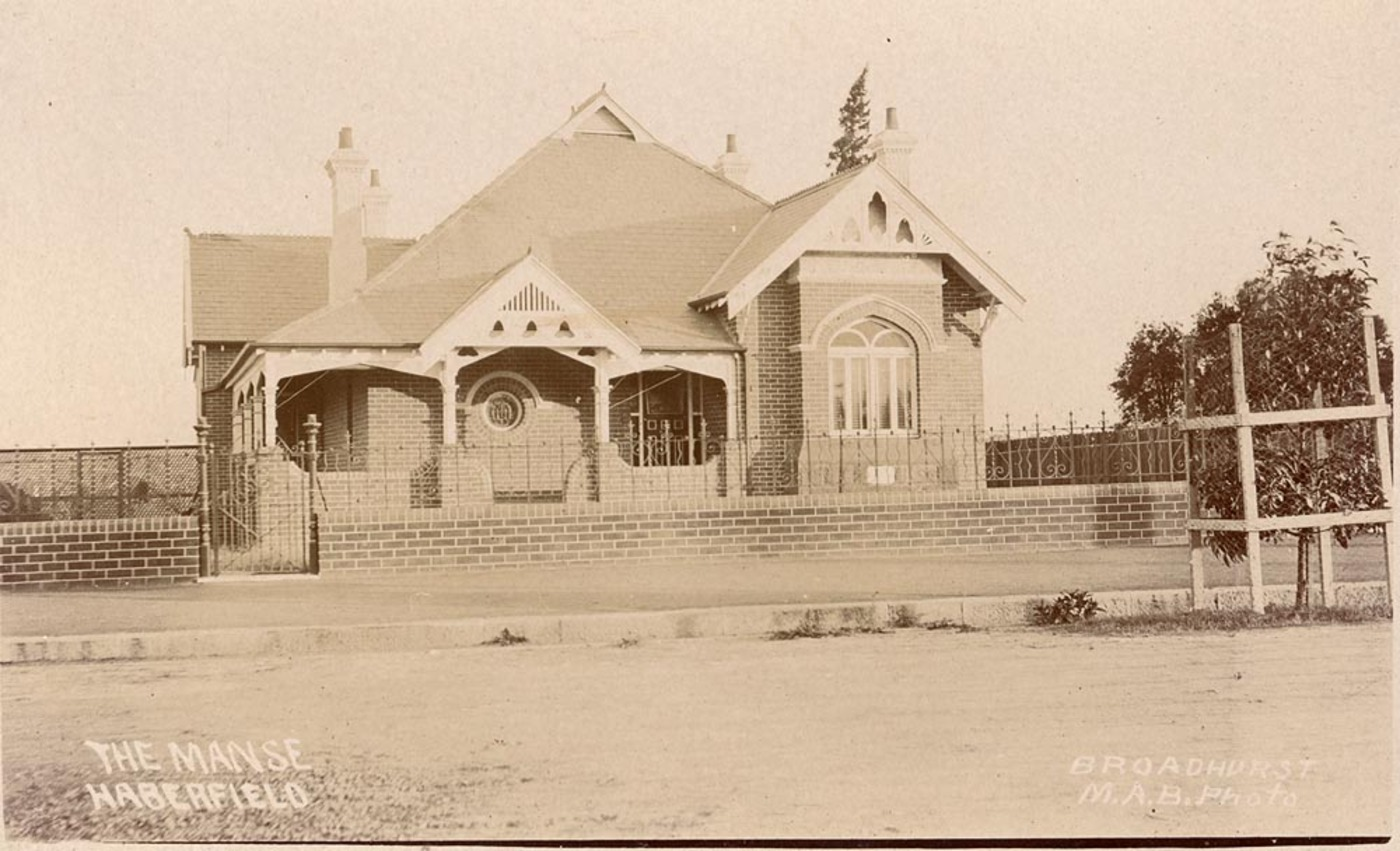
The Manse, Haberfield

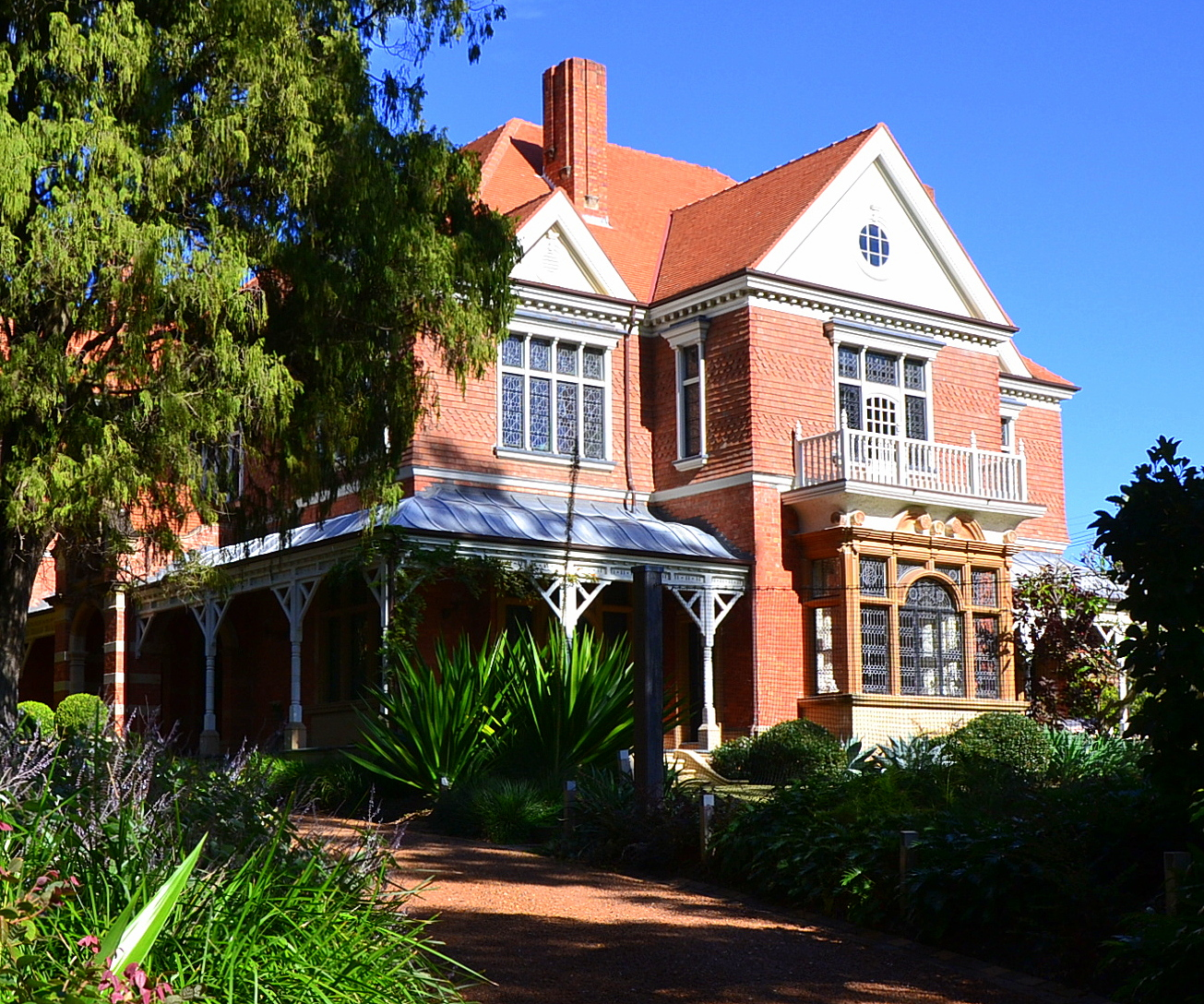
Caerleon, Bellevue Hill, Sydney, NSW

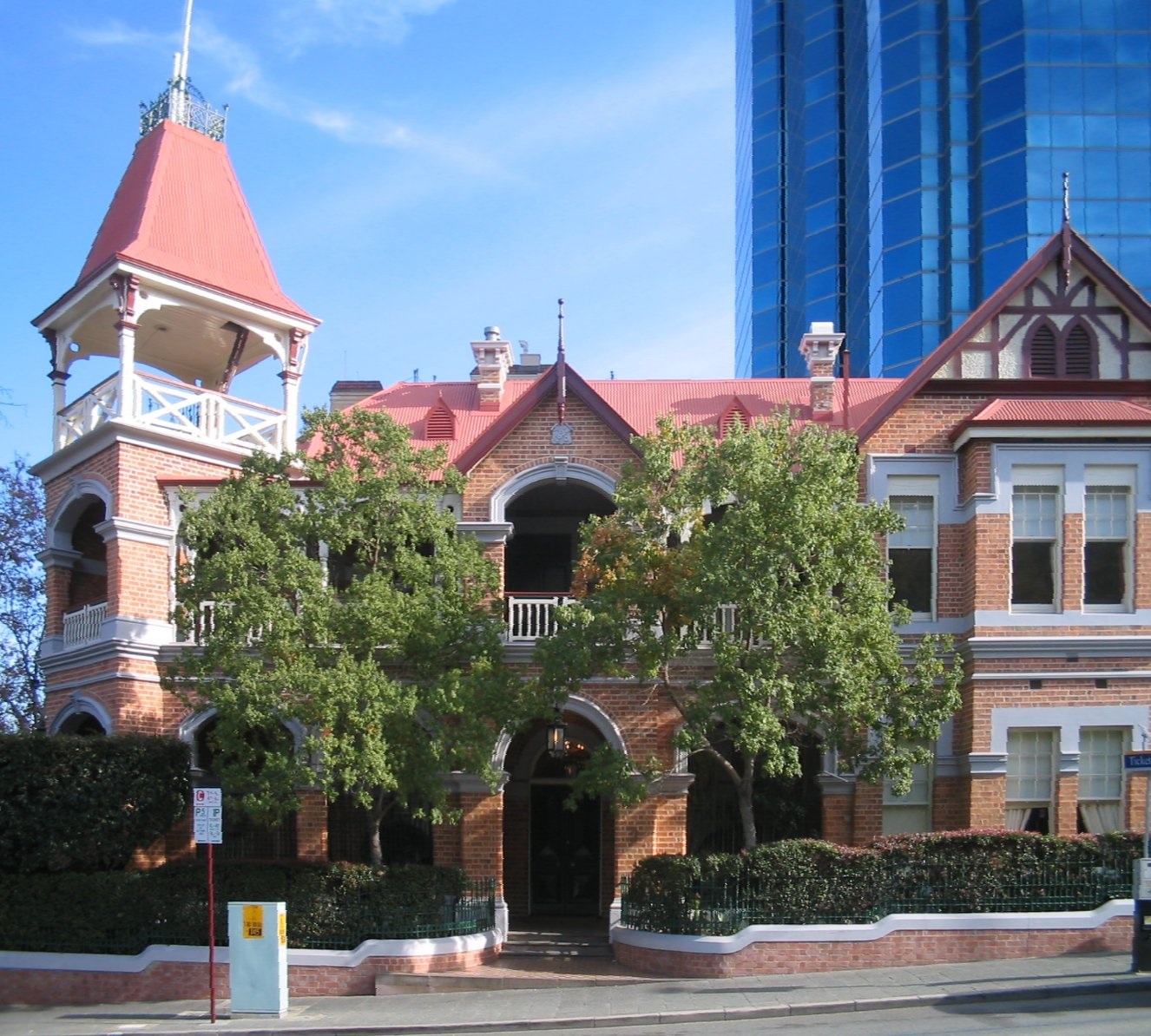
Weld Club, Perth, WA

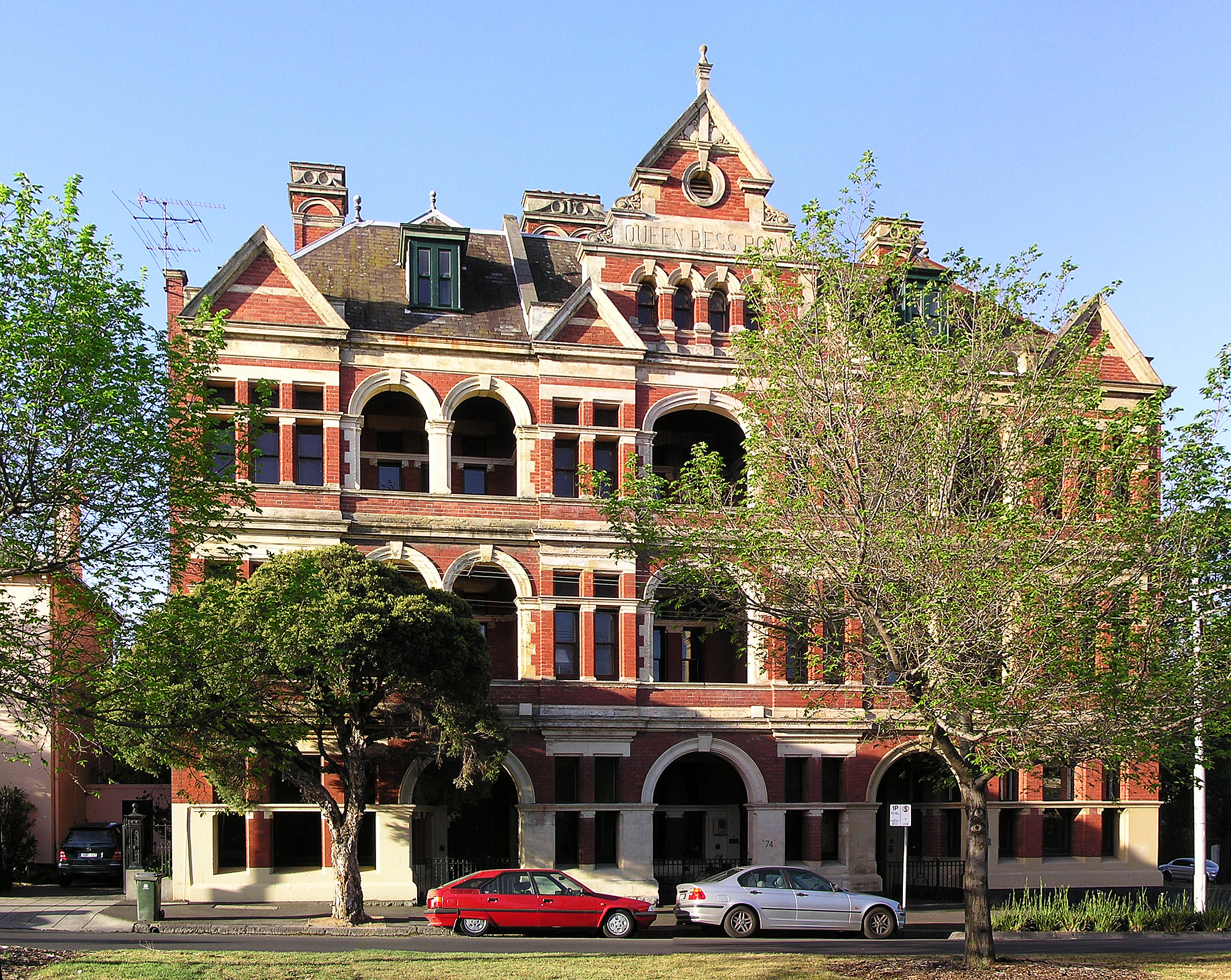
Queen Bess Row in East Melbourne

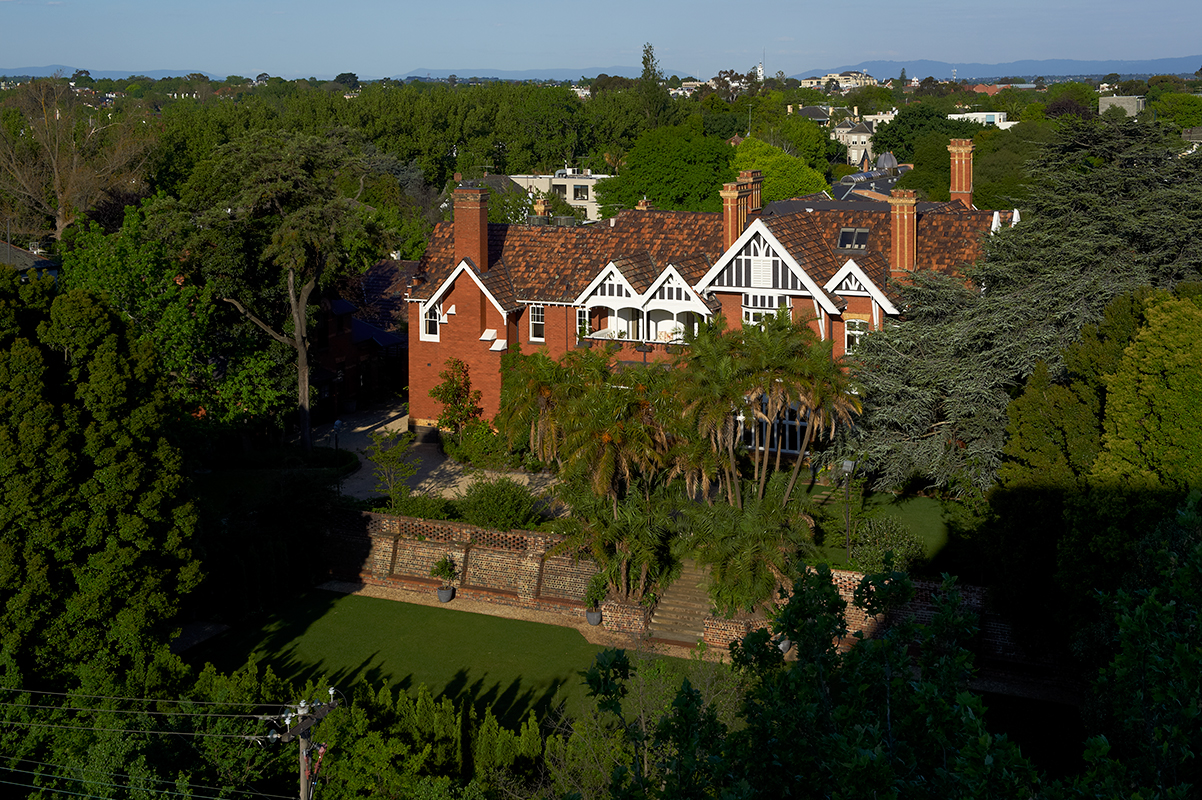
Redcourt, Armadale, Victoria

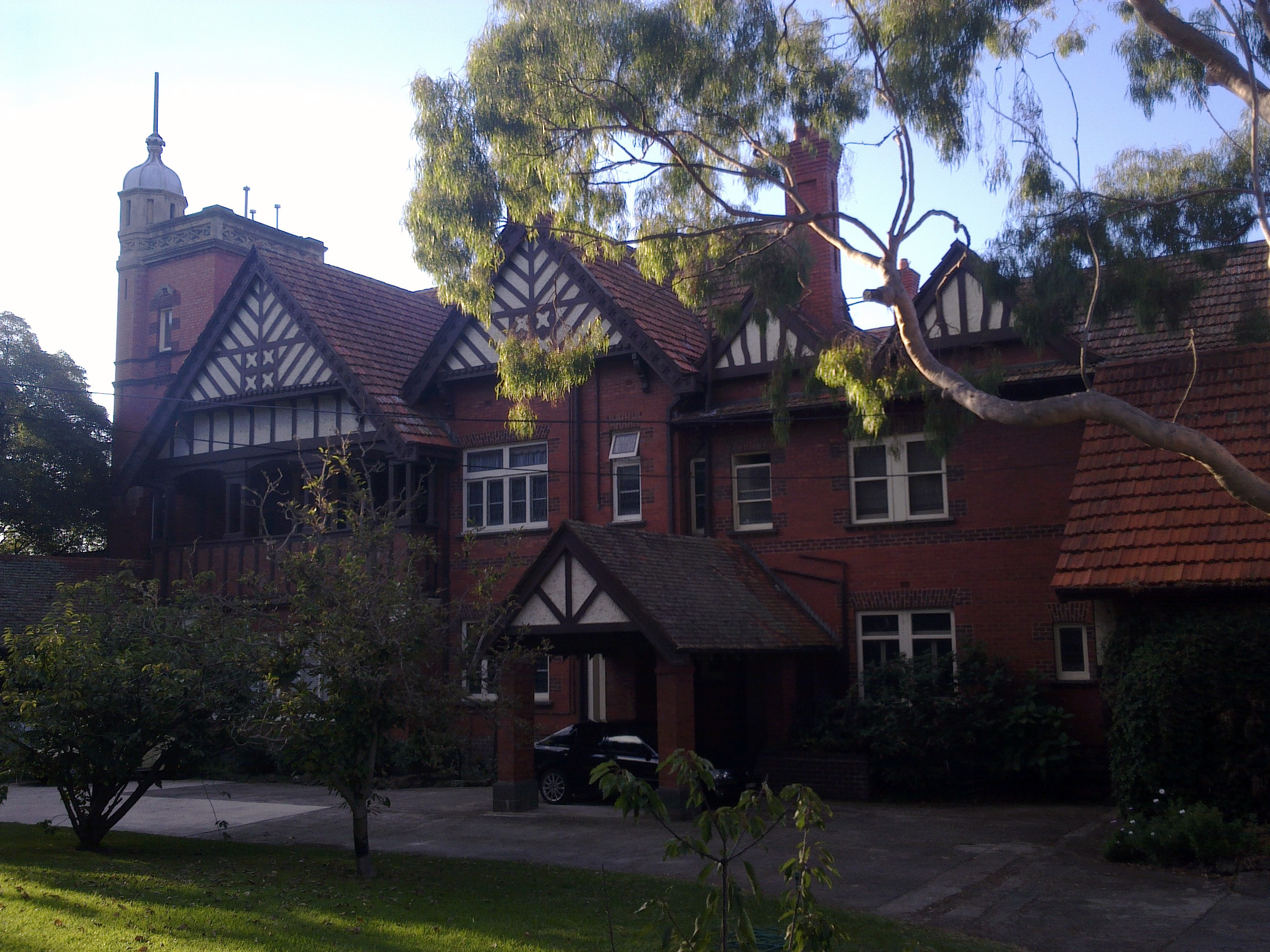
Edzell Mansion, Toorak Victoria

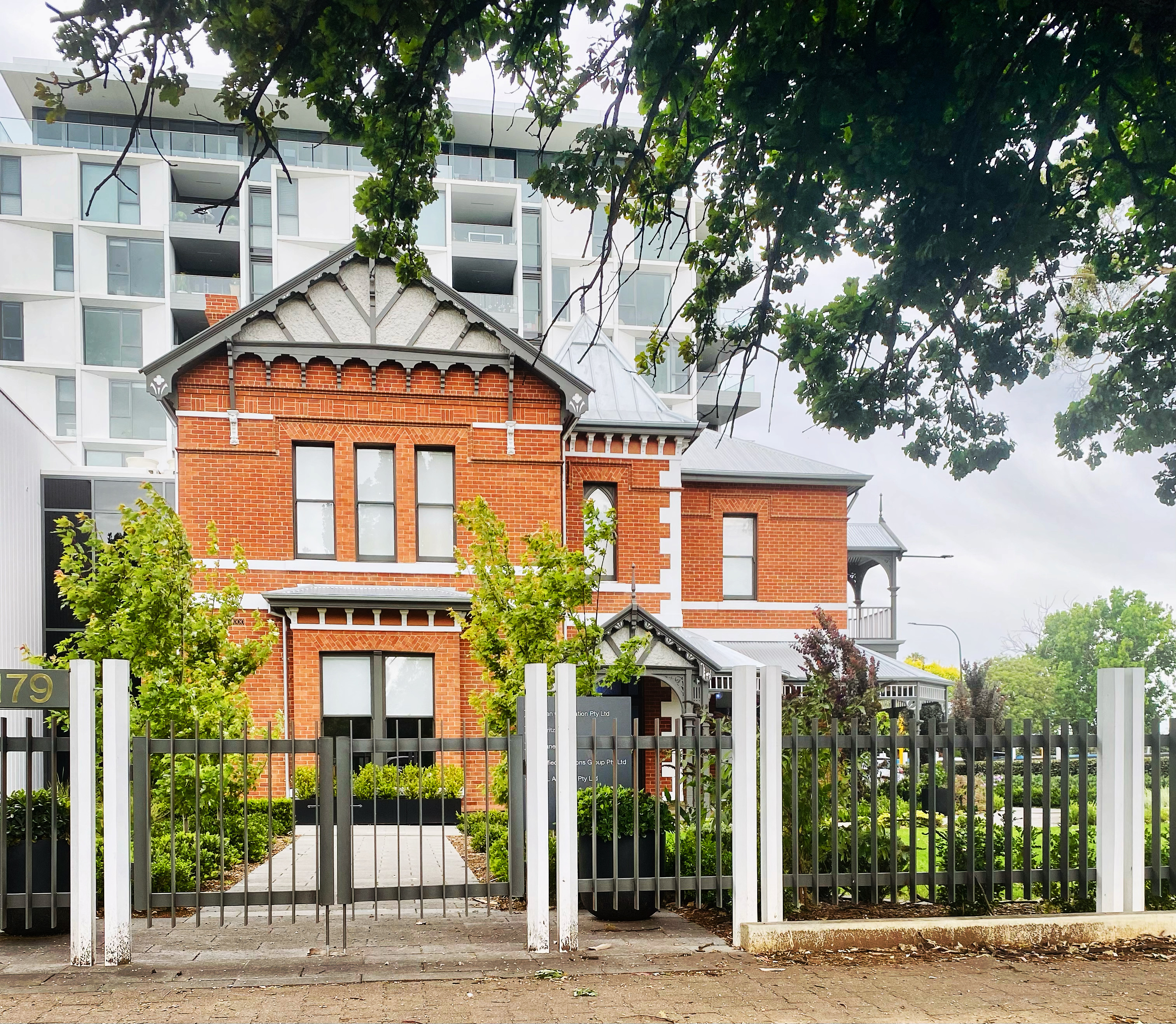
Carramar House in Parkside, South Australia

== See also ==
- Queen Anne style furniture
- Revivalism (architecture)
- Stuart architecture
  - Ramsbury Manor, Wiltshire
  - Restoration style
  - The Vyne, Hampshire
- Maison Joseph-Gauvreau
