= Sacred Heart Church, St Kilda =

Sacred Heart Church, St Kilda 2026
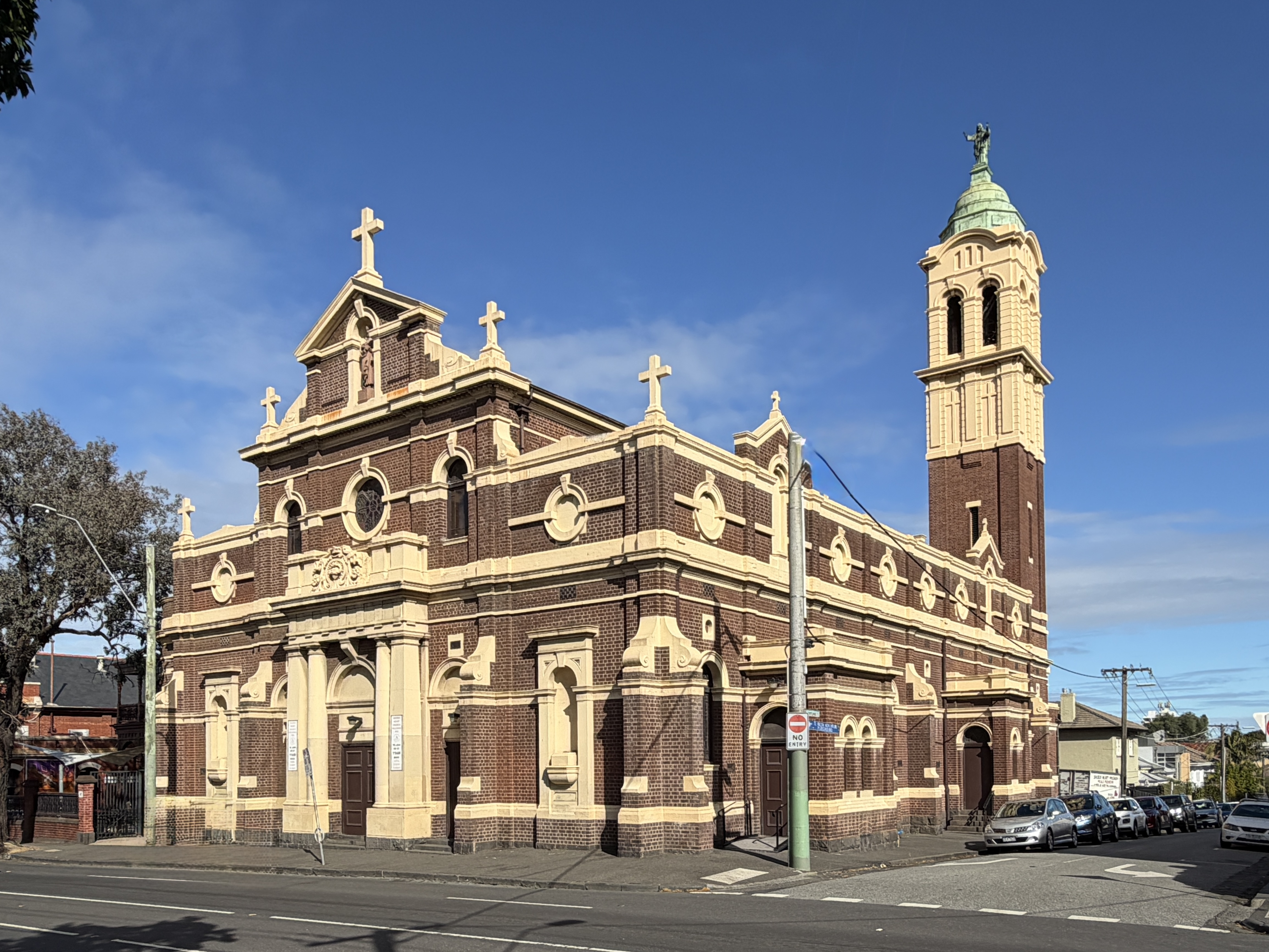
- Exterior on Grey Street, St Kilda
- Sacred Heart Church, St Kilda 2026
- 37°51′46″S 144°58′48″E
- Address: 87 Grey Street, St Kilda, Victoria
- Country: Australia
- Denomination: Roman Catholic

History
- Status: Church
- Founded: 13 July 1884
- Founder: Archbishop Goold
- Dedicated: 7 December 1884

Architecture
- Architect: Reed, Henderson & Smart
- Architectural type: Church
- Style: Italian Renaissance and Baroque
- Years built: 1884 – 1922
- Groundbreaking: 13 July 1884
- Construction cost: £3,300

Victorian Heritage Register
- Official name: Sacred Heart Church, Hall, and Presbytery
- Type: State heritage (Monuments and Memorials, Religion)
- Designated: 19 November 1998
- Reference no.: H1765

The Sacred Heart Church is a Roman Catholic church located in St Kilda, Melbourne, Victoria in Australia. The church is of architectural, aesthetic and historical significance and is one of the major landmarks of St Kilda.

The church, church hall, and presbytery were all listed on the Victorian Heritage Register on 19 November 1998.

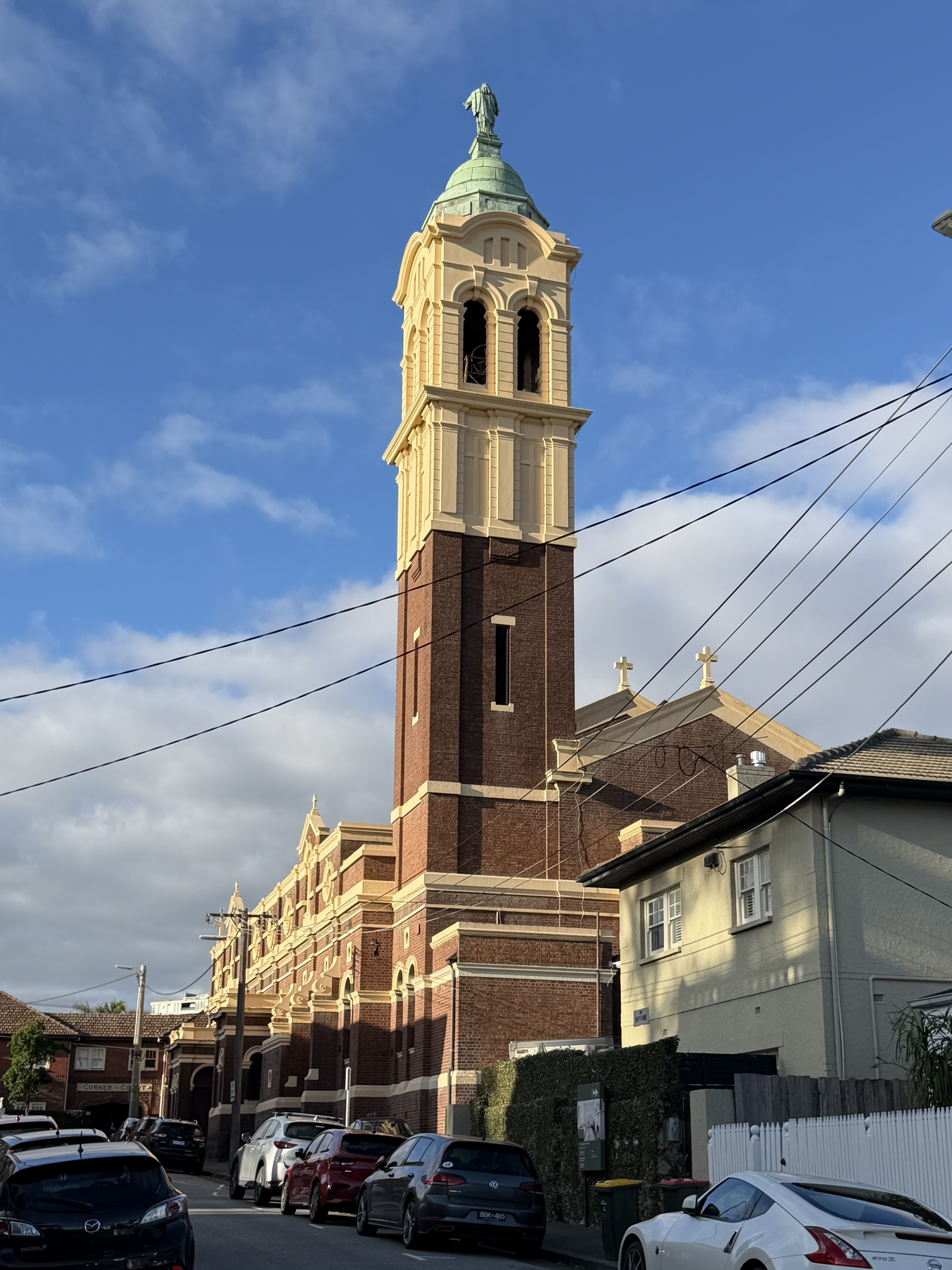
Bell tower from Neptune Street

== Location ==
The church is situated at the centre of St Kilda, on the highest point of Grey Street, though this is not the highest point in the suburb. In the 19th Century this was very prestigious location, when Grey Street was lined with mansions and grand terraces.

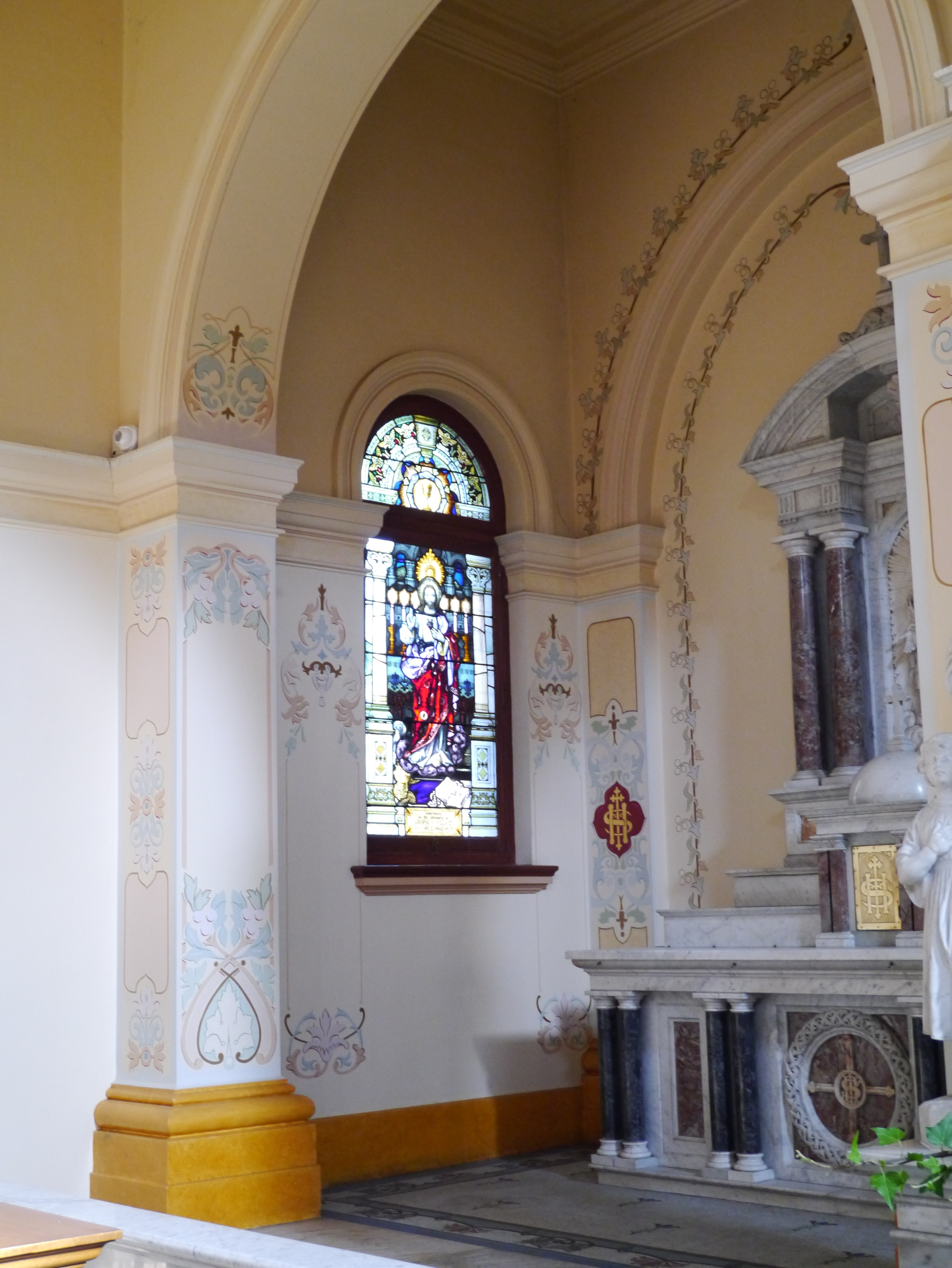
High Altar and stained glass window

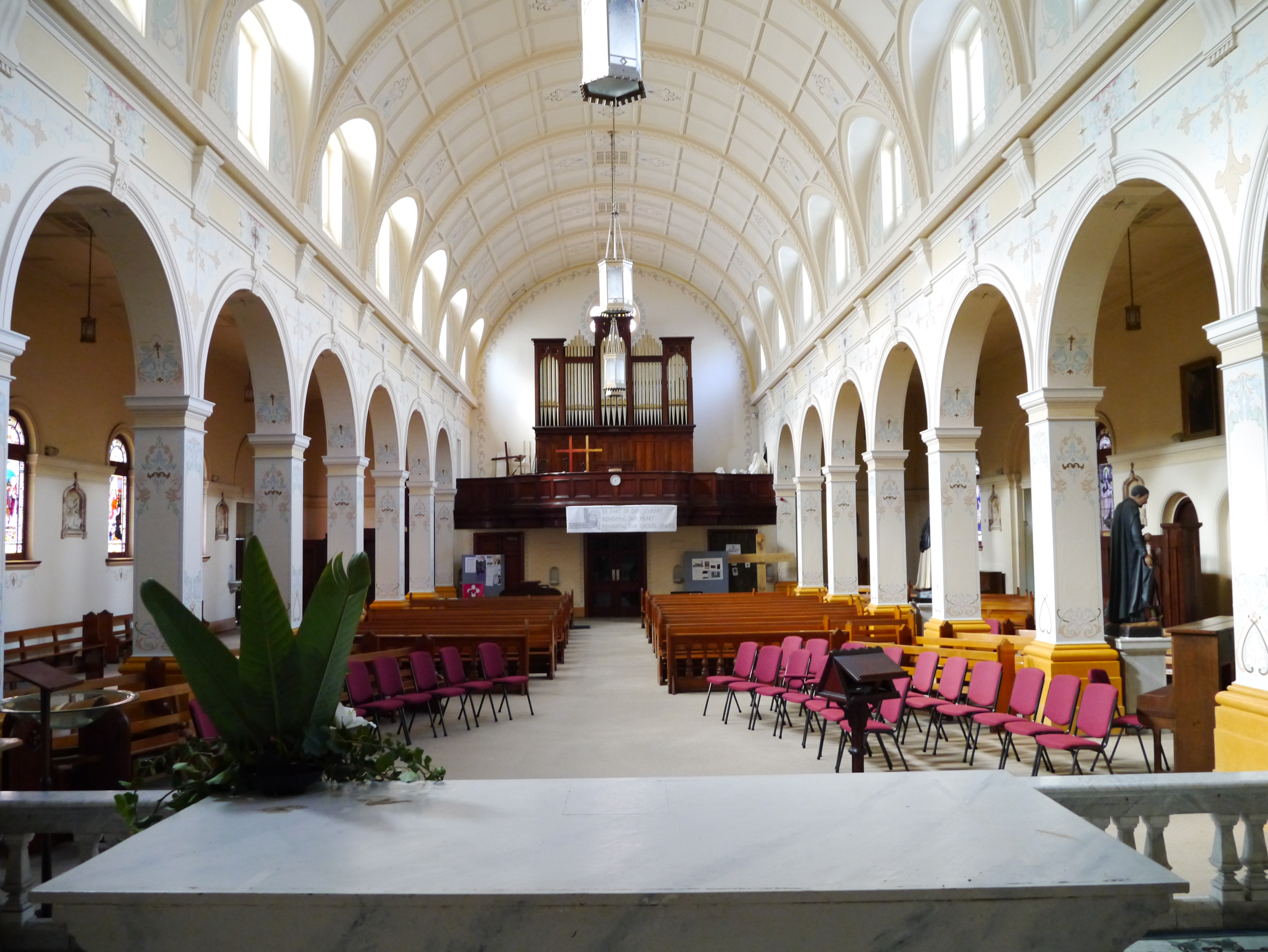
Nave looking toward entrance

== History ==
The first Catholic church to serve the St Kilda area was St Mary's in Dandenong Road, opened in 1853. In the 1880s, the number of people attending St Mary's kept increasing, so in order to host them, land was bought on Grey Street, St Kilda. The foundation stone was formally laid the same year the land was bought, on 13 July 1884 by Archbishop Goold, and the first stage of the church was dedicated less than five months later on 7 December 1884. The architects were Reed, Henderson & Smart. Reverend William Henry Quick was the first priest for the church. He was born in England and educated in Spain, and came to Melbourne in 1872. Father Quick died in 1899, and was succeeded by Father William Ganly.

Only the front six bays of the nave was built at first, with the aisles added in 1890. The interior was decorated in painted and stencilled designs by G & W Dean in 1901. The hall and Presbytery were also added that year, designed by Kempson & Connolly. The hall is in a simplified Baroque style matching the church but in red brick, while the presbytery features a timber verandah in a more Queen Anne style. In 1922, the pair of houses behind on Neptune Street were demolished and the church extended by two bays, and a new sanctuary and a lofty belltower. The architects Kempson and Conolly replicated the materials and style for the extension, except that the bell tower has Edwardian baroque features. The contractor was Brady. The new campanile measures 36 metres, with a copper dome topped with a statue of Christ. A fire broke out during the renovation work damaging one of the altars and burning all the vestments. In November 1922, Archbishop Mannix opened the newly extended church which had cost £18,000, £14,700 more than the original amount.

In 1984 the interior decoration of the church was restored for the centenary by Mulholland.

== Architecture ==
The Sacred Heart Church is of architectural significance due to its Italian Baroque Style heralding the abandonment of the Gothic Revival style favoured by Victoria's Roman Catholics up to then.

It was only a year or two later then similar churches built in areas such as London, Paris, and Dublin. The Sacred Heart Church had set the new style for the subsequent Roman Catholic churches in Victoria, Renaissance and Baroque designs, often in red brick.

The quality of its decorations, fixtures and fittings are an important feature of this church. The barrel-vaulted ceiling, sanctuary and nave show extensive painted and ornamented decorations. The use of gold leaf reflects the Catholic Italianate tradition in expressing the holiness through the stencilled ornaments. The High Altar made out of white Carrara marble, an exceptional example of Baroque style, was designed by the architects Kempson and Connolly. The stained glass windows is also of interest, being the first use of Classical architecture into Roman Catholic Churches.

== Music ==
Music is an integral part of worship at Sacred Heart Church. The church's two-manual of eleven stops pipe organ, which was built by George Fincham & Son, in 1910. The organ went through some minor modifications only for the wind system, everything else has remained the same since it was first built. The organ is located strategically at the centre, in the rear gallery, preserving its original tone scheme, tubular-pneumatic action, pipework, reversed console and unusual casework.

== Sacred Heart Mission ==
The church shared a separate legal entity in 1984 known as the Sacred Heart Mission. It is a welfare-based organisation which now generates multiple community groups serving different purposes for the needy. Their aim is to assist the unemployed, provide affordable housing, assist in aged care, and assist deprived and unemployed women. The women's Program is there to aid women working as prostitutes, heroin-addicted women, and women who have been abused. Another program, known as the outreach program, concentrates on visiting people who live alone, isolated from the public, some of whom suffer agoraphobia. Another program arranges visits as well, but instead, to the aged in nursing homes. The Sacred Heart Mission also assists people who die alone by providing them funerals and burials. Moreover, efforts are made to find the lost families of the individuals. Most of these movements are supported by the donations made from the community. As a result of this parish, attendance at the Sacred Heart Church has tremendously increased.
