= Redcourt Estate =

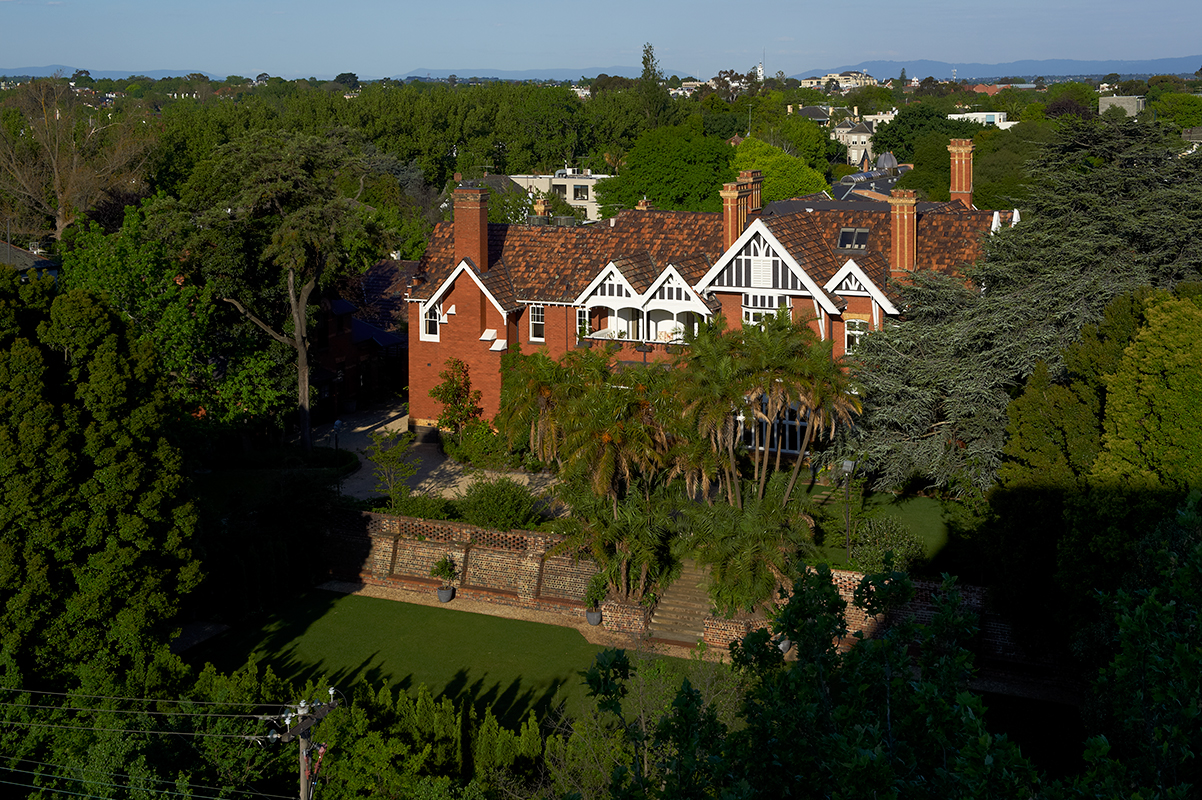
- Redcourt, Armadale

General information
- Location: Armadale, Melbourne, Australia
- Completed: 1888

Technical details
- Size: 3,497 square metre block

Design and construction
- Architect: Joseph Reed

Redcourt Estate, in Armadale, Victoria, Australia, is one of the most significant Queen Anne Revival residences in Australia.

Built in 1888 by Edward Yencken, a renowned local Glass and Timber merchant, 'Redcourt' was designed by Joseph Reed of preeminent architectural firm Reed Henderson and Smart.

Originally the main ‘Redcourt, Armadale' was a significant land holding of five acres fronting Dandenong and Orrong Roads with horses and pasture, until it was reduced, in 1933, to its current size of approx 3,500 sq m (Approx 38,000 sq ft).

After being owned by many notable families, ownership was transferred to the State Government of Victoria’s Ministry of Education in 1956 and was used purely as an all girls residence for country students enrolled at Larnook Domestic Arts Teachers College and in later years regional secondary students from the Victorian College of the Arts until 1997 when it was then vacated and subsequently fell into disrepair.

In 2009, the property was sold back into private ownership and after a significant restoration is now used as a family residence.

== History ==
In the mid-1800s, with the discovery of gold in Victoria, Melbourne was transformed from a country town to boomtown. The rapid economic boom of the Victorian gold rush peaked during the 1880s, by which time Melbourne had become one of the wealthiest cities in the world, and the largest after London.

During a visit in 1885 by English journalist George Augustus Henry Sala coined the phrase “Marvelous Melbourne”, an apt description of a city which had become one of the finest examples of Victorian architectural grandeur in the British Empire It was in this environment that the young Edward Yencken (1854-1932), established himself as one of Melbourne's leading wholesalers and suppliers of paint, hardware, glass, wallpaper and timber.

Yencken commenced his career in the trade by joining the establishment of Brooks, Robinson & Co. Ltd, Melbourne's leading wholesalers and suppliers of paint, hardware and glass in 1871; in 1882, having reached managerial level at Brooks, Robinson & Co, he left to open his own business and departed for Europe in March 1882 with the clear goal of establishing his own agents and contacts.

By January 1883, Yencken's established E.L. Yencken & Co at 5 Flinders Street East, Melbourne, sharing ‘a handsome building on a bluestone foundation, having cellars and three floors above’ with renowned tea, coffee and cocoa merchants, Griffiths Bros.

His experience allowed him to form sole agent agreements with companies such as Lightbown Aspinall – wallpapers; William Harland & Co – varnish; Hamilton and Co – brushwares; Lindcrusta-Walton – wall covering; and the Belgian firm of Rene Verbest Lamal – marble flooring and chimney pieces.

Business flourished and in 1887, as befitting his newly found wealth and status Yencken engaged Melbourne's leading architectural firm of Joseph Reed (Reed, Henderson & Smart) to design a suitable home for himself.

Yencken's choice was clearly an informed one as 'Redcourt, Armadale' became a showcase for his wares and exhibited the very latest in good taste and style.

In the late 1890s 'Redcourt' was bought by the successful mining entrepreneur, founder of BHP and member of Parliament, WR Wilson . Like many of the owners of 'Redcourt' Wilson was a horse enthusiast and owner. Wilson's horses included Wallace, son of Carbine (Winner of the Melbourne Cup and inducted into the Australian and New Zealand Racing Hall of Fame),‘Strathmore’ (Winner of the 1891 Caulfield Guineas 'Trenton' and 'Redcourt'. 'Redcourt' was bred at Wilson's famous St. Albans Stud in Geelong and was named after the 'Redcourt' residence.

After Wilson came John Turnbull, Western district and Queensland pastoralist, the Director of the English and Australian Pastoral and Investment Association, race horse owner and breeder.

In 1912 'Redcourt, Armadale' was sold to Mary Louisa Falkiner, wife of Norman Fraser Falkiner(1872-1929) a grazier, racehorse breeder and politician.

Falkiner owned numerous racehorses including Comedy King who was foaled in 1907 by Persimmon out of the mare Tragedy Queen (by Gallinule). English Derby winner 'Persimmon' was owned by King Edward VII. Comedy King won the Melbourne Cup in 1910 and in doing so became the first foreign bred horse to achieve this feat, defeating both Trafalgar and Apple Pie in the process. He also won the Futurity Stakes in 1909 and the St George Stakes in 1911.

Comedy King went on to be a great sire and his sons Artilleryman (1919) and King Ingoda (1922) also won the Melbourne Cup. In addition to Redcourt the Falkiners also owned and ran the well known horse stud and estate 'Noorilim' in Wahring near Murchison, Victoria.

In February 1914, the Falkiners' engaged the respected architectural firm of Butler & Bradshaw to carry out extensive additions to the building.

In 1924 the Falkiners sold 'Redcourt' to Margaret Duggan Burke, wife of the well-known property developer, racing enthusiast and philanthropist, Thomas Michael Burke.

By the 1930s, many of the original mansion homes around Melbourne had been demolished, converted into apartments or as happened to 'Redcourt' in 1935, turned into a successful guesthouse.

In the mid 1950s 'Redcourt' was bought by the Ministry of Education and became a residence for Art & Music students and was used purely as an all girls residence for country students enrolled at Larnook Domestic Arts Teachers College and in later years regional students from the Victorian College of the Arts.

'Redcourt' remained largely unoccupied from the late 1900s. In 2009 the government sold the property into private ownership for the first time in almost 60 years.

== Renovation ==
Garrisson appointed John Warwicker of London art and design collective, Tomato, as creative director. The pair walked through the building dozens of times before deciding on a theme. Garrisson says the idea was to achieve a "universal language" but with "different dialects" within each space.
