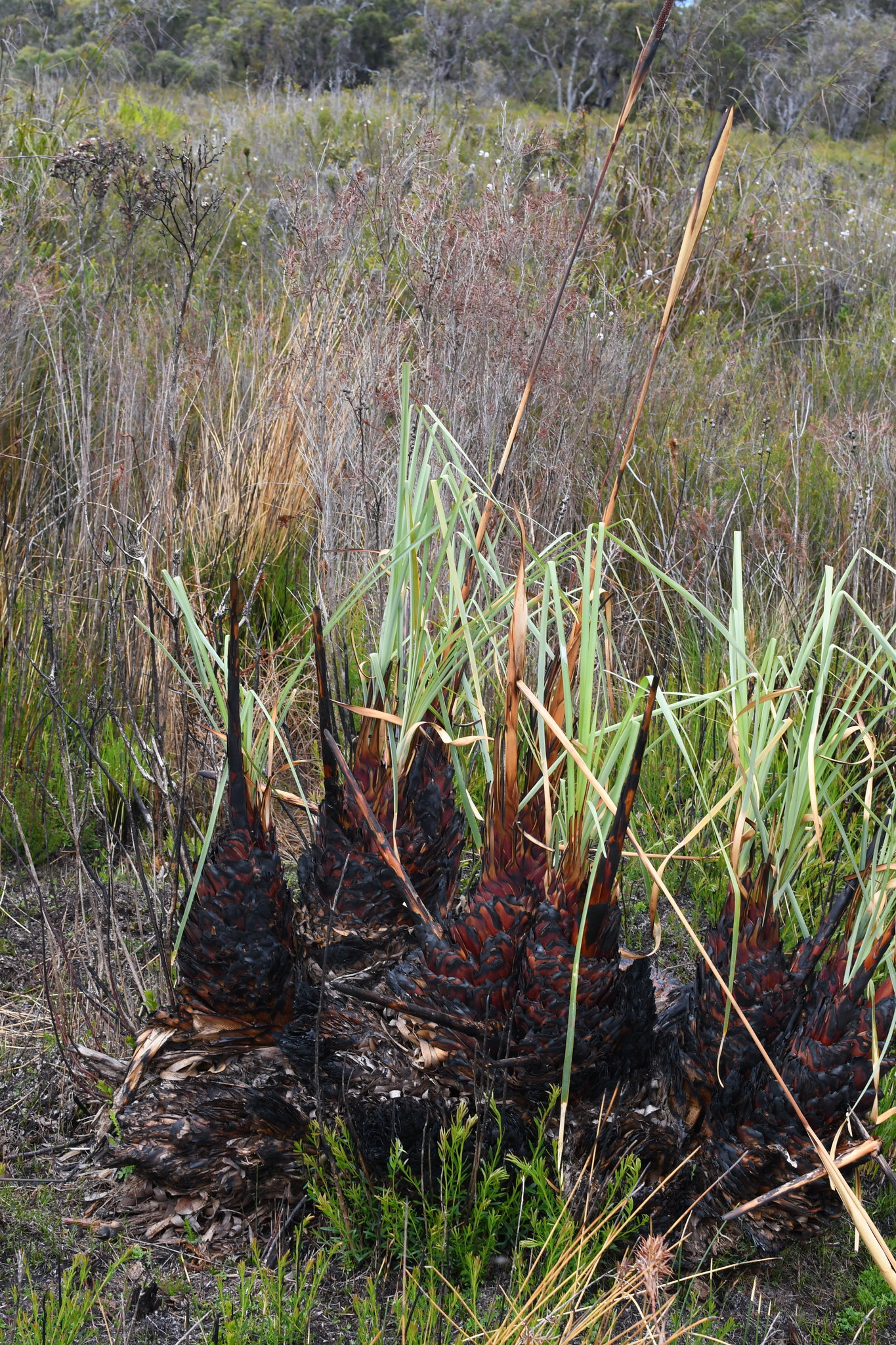

Scientific classification
- Kingdom: Plantae
- Clade: Tracheophytes
- Clade: Angiosperms
- Clade: Monocots
- Clade: Commelinids
- Order: Poales
- Family: Cyperaceae
- Genus: Reedia; F.Muell.
- Species: R. spathacea

Binomial name
- Reedia spathacea F.Muell.

= Reedia =

Species of flowering plant

Reedia is a monotypic genus of flowering plants belonging to the family Cyperaceae. It only contains one known species, Reedia spathacea, a perennial rhizomatous geophyte endemic to Southwest Australia.

The genus name of Reedia is in honour of Joseph Reed (c. 1823 – 1890), a Cornishman by birth, was a prolific and influential Victorian era architect in Melbourne, Australia. The Latin specific epithet of spathacea is derived from spathaceus meaning spathed, derived from spatha, meaning blade. Both the genus and the species were first described and published in Fragm. Vol.1 on page3 239–240 in 1859.
