= Joseph Reed (architect) =

19th-century Australian architect

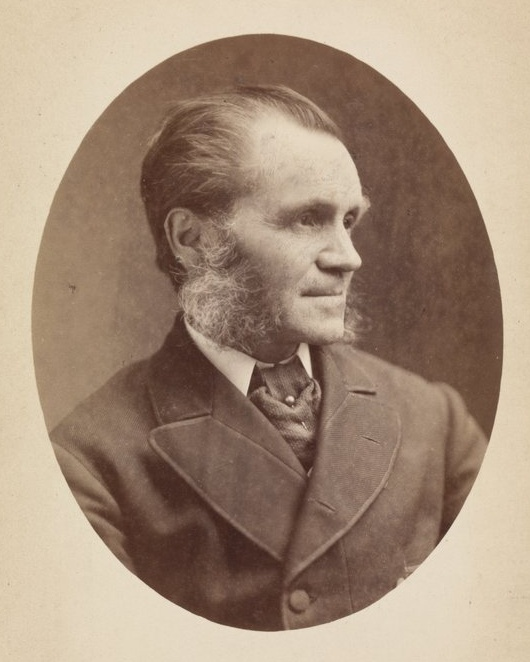
- Reed in c. 1870 – c. 1890
- Born: 1823; Cornwall, England
- Died: 29 April 1890 (aged 66–67); Melbourne, Victoria, Australia
- Occupation: Architect
- Spouse: Hannah Elliot Lane (m. 1885)
- Practice: Reed & Barnes→Bates Smart
- Buildings: State Library of Victoria; Melbourne Town Hall; St Michael's Uniting Church
- Projects: Royal Exhibition Building

Joseph Reed (1823 – 29 April 1890) was an English-born architect in Melbourne, Victoria, Australia in the Victorian era. Considered the city's greatest, his prolific works include many of the city's most loved buildings and significant heritage listings. Among his most famous designs is the World Heritage-listed Royal Exhibition Building, completed for the 1880 International Exposition.

He established his practice in 1853, which through various partnerships and name changes, continues today as Bates Smart, one of the oldest firms continually operating in Australia.

== Biography ==
Born in 1823 in Cornwall, England, Joseph Reed's early career may have included some local training, and he is known to have worked in the offices of some noted architects in London.

He decided to start a new career at the age of 30 in Australia, arriving in Melbourne in 1853, and very soon made a name for himself. The next year he won the design competition for the State Library of Victoria, the Geelong Town Hall in 1855, and designed the Melbourne head office for the Bank of New South Wales in Collins Street in 1856.

In 1859, botanist Ferdinand von Mueller described Reedia, a genus of flowering plants from south-western Australia, belonging to the family Cyperaceae, naming it in Reed's honour.

In 1862 he partnered with Frederick Barnes (1824–1884) the firm becoming Reed & Barnes. In 1883 Barnes retired from the partnership and Reed was joined by A. M. Henderson and F. J. Smart becoming Reed Henderson & Smart. In the late 1880s Reed suffered financial difficulties through land speculation, which is said to have affected his health such that he died of 'inanition and exhaustion' on 29 April 1890. Just before then Henderson had withdrawn, and N. B. Tappin joined the firm, becoming Reed Smart & Tappin, the name continuing and after Reed's death. The office later became Bates, Peebles & Smart, then Bates Smart McCutcehon, and then Bates Smart.

Later in life, Reed met and married Hannah Elliot Lane on 26 March 1885. They had no children.

=== Architectural expression ===
Reed's buildings represent an impressive body of work, in a range of then popular styles, each one a fine essay in the chosen idiom. He could design in Neoclassical, Renaissance Revival, Gothic Revival, Italianate, Baroque, French Second Empire, Romanesque and Queen Anne, and of course as typical for 19th century architects, designs that blended more than one historical style.

Following a visit to Europe in 1863 he experienced first hand the late medieval brick architecture of Lombardy, the source for the bold polychrome brick Gothic Revival already popular in England, which he soon expressed in his designs for the Collins Street Independent Church (1867), St Jude's in Carlton (1866), and Frederick T. Sargood's Rippon Lea Estate at Elsternwick (1868). These works were the first expression of polychrome brick medieval Italian in Victoria, which by the 1880s had gained enormous popularity for all types of buildings.

Major works in classical style include the State Library of Victoria (1856), Bank of New South Wales, Collins St (1856) and Melbourne Trades Hall (1873). The Trades Hall is grandly palatial, the world's oldest and probably most splendid trades hall. In the fashionable Second Empire style Reed also designed Melbourne Town Hall (1870) while the World Heritage-listed Royal Exhibition Building, completed for the 1880 International Exposition in Melbourne is Italianate with a Florentine dome. Designs in Gothic mode include the Wesley Church (1857), the Scots' Church (1871–4), across the road from the earlier Romanesque Independent Church, and the grand Wilson Hall at Melbourne University (1882). Sacred Heart Church, St Kilda (1884) was a major essay in the Baroque style, not commonly seen in Melbourne. The mansion Redcourt in Armadale (1888) was another departure, this time in the very new Queen Anne style, introducing features that would become characteristic of most Edwardian houses after 1900.

Reed completed the building of St Paul's Anglican Cathedral as designed by English architect William Butterfield after that architect resigned the project in 1884. Reed was faithful to the original design, but provided most of the furnishings, including the elaborate pulpit, and designed the attached Chapter House in matching style.

=== Recognition ===
The Victorian Chapter of the Australian Institute of Architects recognises Reed's contribution to Melbourne and the architecture profession with the annually awarded Joseph Reed Urban Design Award.

== Notable works ==
The following buildings were designed by Joseph Reed, as a sole practitioner. For the buildings that were designed by Reed is partnership with Frederick Barnes in 1862, and its subsequent reincarnations to form Bates Smart in 1995, see notable projects of Bates Smart.

Project name	Image	Date	Location	Description and awards	Notes
Collins Street Baptist Church		1855	170–174 Collins St, Melbourne	Added to the Victorian Heritage Register	
Geelong City Hall		1855	Little Malop St, Geelong	Southern wing and overall design by Reed; added to the Victorian Heritage Register	
Bank of New South Wales building		1856	55 Collins St West, (Note: 55 Collins Street West was later renumbered as 368–374 Collins Street.) Melbourne	Demolished with facade relocated to The University of Melbourne in 1936	
		1857	182–186 George St, East Melbourne		
Wesley Church complex		1858	136 Lonsdale St, Melbourne	Comprises the church (1858); the manse (1859); and the school house (1859); all designed by Reed and added to the Victorian Heritage Register	
Royal Society of Victoria buildings		1858	2–8 La Trobe St and 1–9 Victoria St, Melbourne	Added to the Victorian Heritage Register	
		1861	157 Hotham St, East Melbourne	(attributed)	
Bank of Victoria		1862	251 Collins St, Melbourne	Merged with the Commercial Banking Company of Sydney in 1927; new building erected in c. 1928 behind Reed's 1862 facade; demolished in the 1970s	
Beleura		1863	1 Tallis Dr, Mornington	Attrib. to Reed; added to the Victorian Heritage Register; additions by others	
National Museum		1863	University of Melbourne	Demolished	
Melbourne Public Library		1864	Melbourne	Added to the Victorian Heritage Register	
Reed & Barnes (1862) and antecedent practices
See notable projects of Bates Smart
