= Godfrey and Spowers =

Australian architectural design firm

Godfrey and Spowers, now Spowers, is an Australian architectural design firm established about 1901 century in Melbourne, specializing in commercial and institutional buildings since the 1920s.

== William Scott Purves Godfrey ==
William Scott Purves Godfrey

W.S.P Godfrey was born in Toorak on 6 April 1872. He was educated in Brussels and at Melbourne Grammar and studied Architecture at the University of Melbourne where he was articled to Joseph Reed of Reed, Henderson & Smart. W S P Godfrey retired from practice in 1944. He died in August 1953, aged 81.

=== Henry Howard Spowers ===
Henry Howard Spowers was born on 18 July 1872 in Melbourne, Victoria, Australia. He died on 7 January 1933 in Hawthorn. Spowers trained with Charles d’Ebro.

== Firm History ==
In 1895, William Scott Purves Godfrey formed an architectural partnership with a surveyor named Howitt. They called their firm Howitt & Godfrey. After six years Howitt left and Henry Howard Spowers joined the firm. The firm was then registered as Godfrey and Spowers, and shortly afterwards they moved into an office at 34 Queen Street, Melbourne.

Although a few commercial buildings were undertaken, until WW1 the firm’s practice consisted mainly of houses for the 'well-to-do', with coach-houses and servant’s wings. They were for a time the architects for Melbourne Grammar School completing the Cuming Wing in 1908, the Ross Memorial Gates in 1910, and the Jubilee Wing in 1913.

The First World War slowed the growth of the firm. In the mid-1920s a number of commercial and industrial projects were carried out, most significantly the 1926 Argus Building, a newspaper office and printery, on the north-west corner of Elizabeth and LaTrobe Streets.

After WW1 the firm built a number of branches for the State Savings Bank of Victoria and the Bank of New South Wales in the Melbourne suburbs and the country Victoria, the most notable being the Egyptian influenced Bank of NSW branch at 190 Bourke Street in 1930.

In December 1932 Spowers died and in about 1934 Godfrey's son also named William, but known by his middle name as Race Godfrey succeeded as partner. The practice was commissioned to design the new Melbourne headquarters for the Bank of New South Wales, and this building was the winner of the Street Architecture Medal for 1936.

In 1941, the practice was suspended due to the war. Race Godfrey worked with the RAAF as a civilian architect in Melbourne and Sydney, while W S P Godfrey, who was then 69, carried out a few commissions for air-raid shelters and other requirements of ARP authorities until the war ended. Race Godfrey returned to Melbourne to recommence practice late in 1944. W S P Godfrey did not continue with the new firm, and retired from practice in 1944.

In 1961, John M. Davidson was made a partner of the firm. He later became a director and eventually chairman. By the early 1960s, the firm was expanded to become Godfrey Spowers, Hughes Mewton & Lobb. and designed the National Mutual Building, demolished in 2015. The firm continued to design commercial projects through the succeeding decades, changing name to Spowers in the 1990s, a firm that continues to design a wide range of buildings styles, and provide a range of services across Australia and internationally.

== Significant Buildings ==
The Argus Building, completed in 1926, is an office building of State historical and architectural significance. It was the former headquarters of Melbourne's Argus newspaper. A classical cooling tower is a prominent feature of this building.

The former Bank of New South Wales (Westpac Bank) building was constructed in 1929-30. The building is six stories in height and located at 190-192 Bourke St, Melbourne. The building is of the Interwar period and sits on a sandstone base. The use of Egyptian motifs and of decorative terra-cotta faience makes are unique in Melbourne.

In 1973, as part of an effort to showcase Australian design in overseas diplomatic missions, the Australian Government of Gough Whitlam commissioned Godfrey and Spowers to design the new High Commission to Singapore at 25 Napier Road. Completed at a cost of AU$4.2 million, the high commission chancery was officially opened by the Minister for Foreign Affairs, Andrew Peacock, on 21 January 1977.

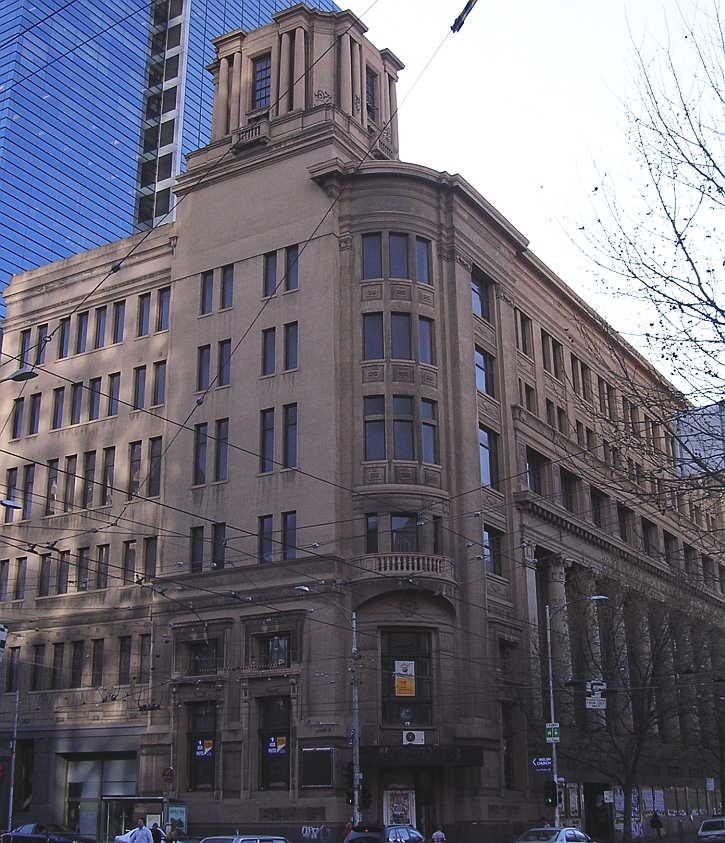
Argus building, Latrobe Street, Melbourne

Floor Plan, Godfrey & Spowers, Toorak Residence

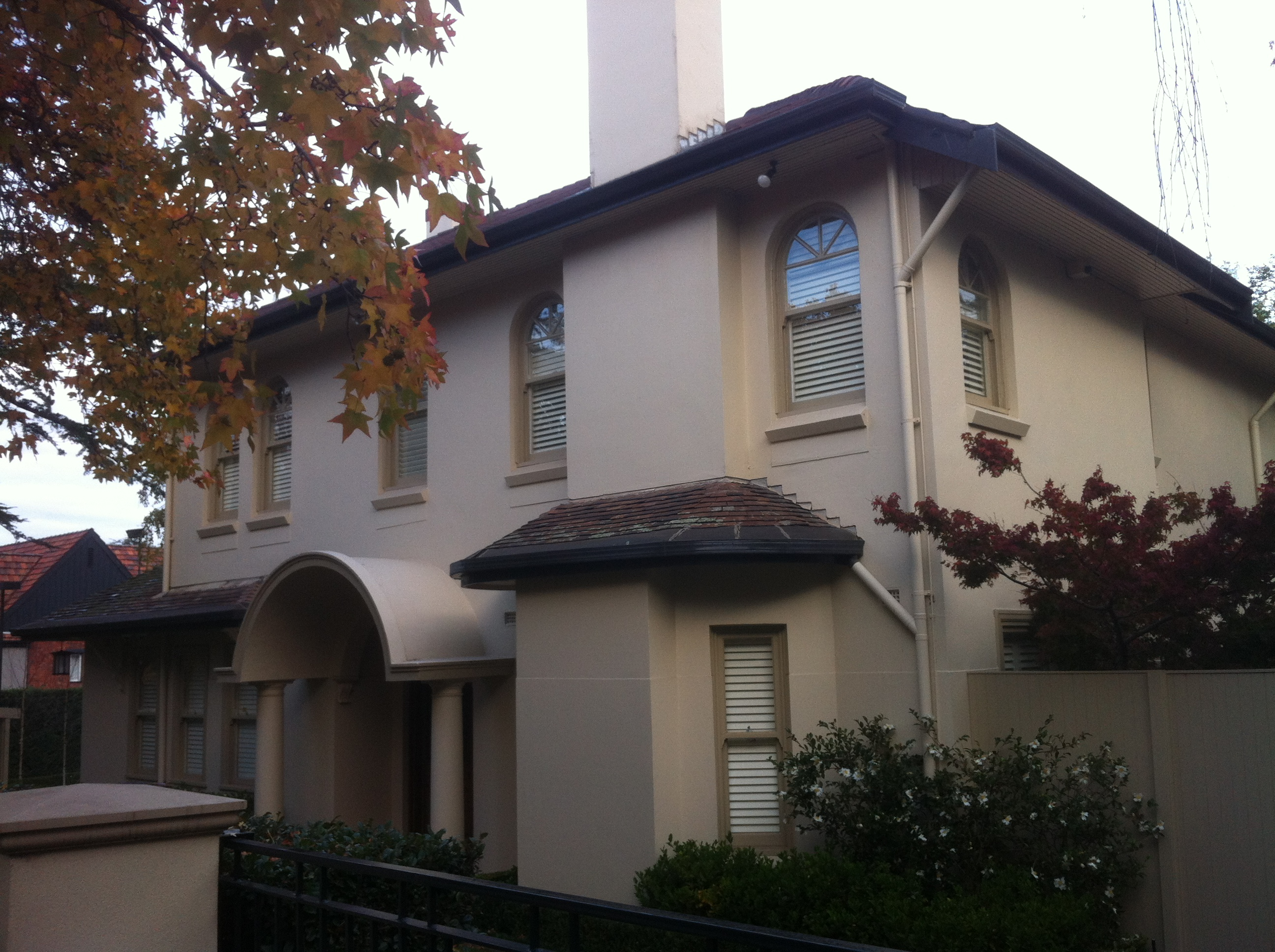
6 Hamilton Rd. Malvern, Victoria, Australia. Godfrey & Spowers, 1928

== Awards ==
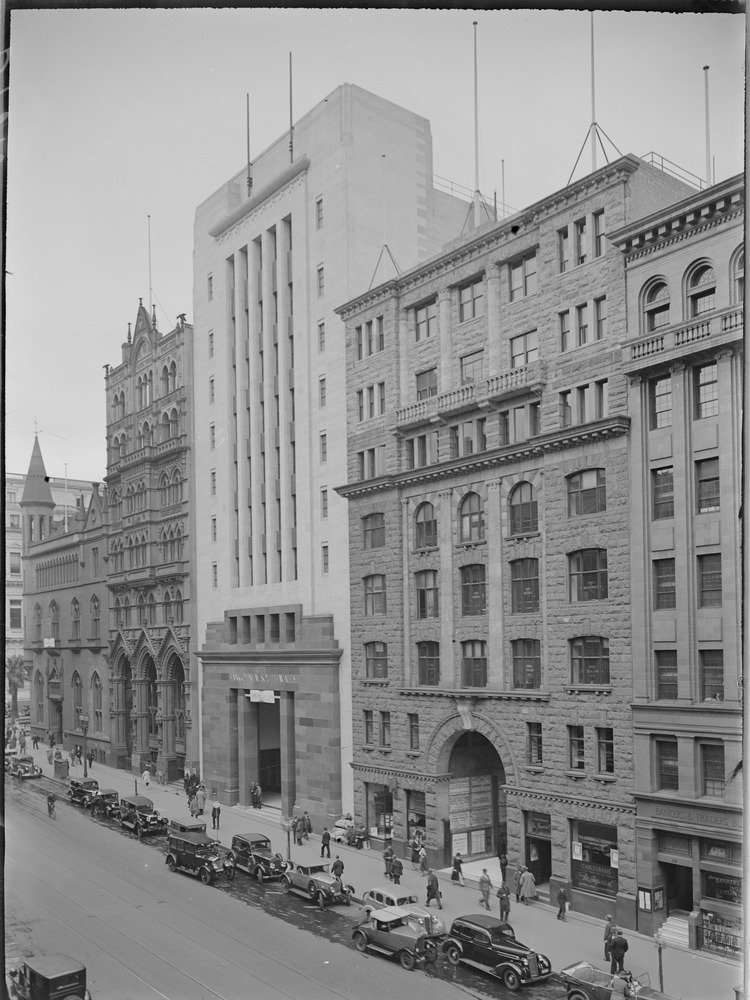
View of Godfrey & Spowers' new Bank of New South Wales building, since demolished

1936 Street Architecture Gold Medal for The Bank of New South Wales at 368—374 Collins Street, Melbourne.
