= Taree High School =

Location
- Taree, Mid North Coast, New South Wales; Australia; 31°54′35″S 152°27′49″E

Information
- Type: Government-funded co-educational comprehensive secondary day school
- Motto: Latin: Flumen Coronent Filii (May your Sons and Daughters Crown the River)
- Established: 1908; 118 years ago
- School district: Taree
- Educational authority: NSW Department of Education
- Executive Principal: Nigel Reece
- Teaching staff: 63.1 FTE (2020)
- Years: 7–12
- Enrolment: 833 (2020)
- Campus type: Regional
- Colours: Black and gold
- Website: taree-h.schools.nsw.gov.au

Taree High School (abbreviated THS) is a government-funded co-educational comprehensive secondary day school in Taree, a regional centre of the Mid North Coast region of New South Wales, Australia.

Established in 1908, THS is the oldest of the high schools in the Taree area, servicing Taree and the Manning Valley area, and the school enrolled approximately 833 students in 2020, from Year 7 to Year 12, of whom 20 percent identified as Indigenous Australians and four percent were from a language background other than English. The school is operated by the NSW Department of Education; and the executive principal is Nigel Reece.

== Overview ==
The school is equipped with specialist facilities and works closely with local primary schools, the business community and Taree TAFE. A semesterised curriculum is used at the school, providing a variety of subjects and units.

In 2013 Taree High School and Taree Public School became part of the Connected Communities Strategy. This strategy aims to provide tailored programs to improve educational outcomes for Aboriginal students and their families across New South Wales.

THS's motto is Flumen Coronent Filii, Latin for "May your sons and daughters crown the river", referring to the Manning River, a feature of the town of Taree.

School facilities include a library, full-size gymnasium, drama room with lighting, sound equipment and stage curtains, canteen, Year 12 outdoor area and common room, school hall, Ngarralbaa (Aboriginal resource room), agricultural farm, and a special education unit.

Taree High School's first executive principal was Allison Alliston. The deputy principals were Nigel Reece and Raylene Starke.

== Curriculum ==
Taree High School is operated by the NSW Department of Education and therefore follows the curriculum for all years developed by the New South Wales Education Standards Authority.

The school has implemented a unitised curriculum involving Years 8 to 10, in order to provide students with a wide range of subject choices. As students progress through Years 8 to 10, they are offered a wider number of subject choices. In addition to the mandated, more traditional areas of study, the school offers unique study units such as outdoor education, ceramics and robotics.

In their senior years, students are prepared for the NSW Higher School Certificate (HSC) and may study the Board Developed Courses to satisfy requirements. Alternatively, THS offers a Work Studies program involving TAFE study and work placement for those students wishing to enter the workforce upon completion of their high school education. All students have access to vocational education and training (VET) courses through both the school and TAFE.

THS also participates in the Senior Curriculum Advantage project, which uses the course offerings at all three Manning Valley High Schools, Chatham, Wingham and Taree, to ensure Year 11 and 12 students can access a broad and relevant curriculum. Senior students may choose to remain at one school only or to access courses at other "host" school on a Wednesday afternoon in lieu of sport.

Students who leave school before receiving their Higher School Certificate (HSC) receive the NSW Record of School Achievement (RoSA). The RoSA records all completed Year 9, 10 and 11 courses and grades, and participation in any uncompleted Year 11 courses.

== Co-curriculum ==
=== Community ===
Taree High School students participate in a number of community events throughout the school year. Highlights of the community program include:

- The Vampire Shield initiative, that is run annually by the local blood bank.
- Students march at the local Anzac Day parade that is held every year.
- SRC representatives join other local schools in discussing issues that affect all students of the local area, at Youth Advisory Committee (YAC) meetings, which are run by Greater Taree City Council.
- The school participates in NAIDOC (National Aboriginal Islander Day Observance Committee) week events.

The school also caters for exchange students from around the world.

=== Debating ===
Taree High School has three debating teams: a Years 7/8, 9/10, and a senior debating team, which made it to the regional level of the Premier's Debating Challenge NSW.

=== Leadership ===
To encourage leadership skills, THS has a Student Representative Council, made up of the school's captains and representatives from every year group. Each year group elects its representatives annually. School captains are also elected each year by peers and teachers.

The school holds an annual ANZAC Day assembly at the school and the captains prepare speeches for this. The SRC representatives organise school socials, write year reports for newsletters, run school assemblies, coordinate out of uniform days to raise money for charities, and help in the canteen to reduce waiting lines. SRC meetings are held weekly. Important issues within the school's agenda are discussed and debated on, with SRC representatives voicing their peers' opinions and ideas.

=== Performing arts ===
A music, arts, drama and dance concert, known as MADD, is held every year at the local Manning Entertainment Centre in order to allow students to showcase their talents and perform. The MADD concert is hosted by the Year 11 Drama students, who film it and sell the videos and DVDs to the school community.

=== Publications ===
The school annually produces a magazine, The Torch, containing student poems, stories, artwork, reports, and other work. Students may purchase the magazine at the end of the year.

=== Sport ===
Students represent Taree High School in various sporting events, and the school encourages them to further their talents in areas such as aerobics, cricket, soccer, volleyball, basketball, tennis, surfing, waterpolo and others.

== House system ==
As with most Australian schools, Taree High School utilises a house system. The school established four houses in 1935 or 1936, Manning (blue), Murray (purple), Hooke (green) and Peel (red).

Through this house system, students annually participate in a swimming carnival, an athletics carnival, a beach day, a Spirit day and cross country events. The four houses are rewarded with points for every participant in each event, and at the completion of each carnival the house with the most points is declared the winner.

== Initiatives ==
Taree High School has implemented the Positive Behaviour for Learning process, an evidence-based whole-school process to improve learning outcomes for all students. THS's core values are Cooperation, Participation and Respect (CPR). Students can earn CPR Tickets by modelling these expectations and are rewarded with weekly prize draws and House points.

Taree High School introduced the Millennium Parent Portal in 2015. The Portal allows the main caregiver of each student to access live attendance feeds, student notices, timetables, academic results and reports, parent/teacher bookings and behavior records with their unique logon.

Taree High School posts regularly to social media to keep the Taree community informed of school news and events.

== Uniform ==
Students can wear any uniform piece with any other uniform piece. They are required to wear a gold polo during sport and practical PDHPE classes.

== Notable alumni ==
- Wayne Berry – politician; former Speaker in the Australian Capital Territory Legislative Assembly; former Member for Ginninderra
- Bruce Cowan AM – former Member of the NSW Legislative Assembly, Member for Oxley, Minister for Agriculture and Minister for Water Resources (Country Party)
- Allan Harman OAM, RFD – cleric; research professor of the Presbyterian Theological College; former Moderator of the Presbyterian Church of Victoria
- Alf Maiden CBE – public servant; former Secretary of the Department of Primary Industry, commercial counsellor and Australian government trade commissioner; managing director of the International Wool Secretariat
- Les Murray AO – poet
- Robert Tickner AO – CEO of the Australian Red Cross; former politician who served as the Federal Minister of Aboriginal and Torres Strait Islander Affairs, Member for Hughes (also attended Forster High School)
- Mark Vaile AO – former Deputy Prime Minister of Australia

== See also ==
- List of government schools in New South Wales: Q–Z
- List of schools in the Northern Rivers and Mid North Coast
- Education in Australia
