= F. Maxwell Bradshaw =

Australian barrister, writer and Presbyterian elder

Frederick Maxwell Bradshaw (1910 – 11 May 1992) was an Australian barrister, writer, and Presbyterian elder.

Bradshaw was born in Melbourne and educated at Scotch College and the University of Melbourne. He was admitted to the Bar in 1936.

Bradshaw became an elder of Hawthorn Presbyterian Church in 1941. In 1959 he became procurator of the General Assembly of the Presbyterian Church of Australia (PCA). He served in that role until his death, and played a vital part in the continuation of the PCA after the formation of the Uniting Church in 1977. He also became honorary legal advisor to the Presbyterian Church of Eastern Australia in 1943 and assisted them in their union with the Free Presbyterian Church of Victoria in 1953.

Bradshaw was secretary of the Calvinistic Society, which he helped form in 1939. This group started the Reformed Theological Review in 1942.

Bradshaw wrote a number of books, including Scottish Seceders in Victoria (1947), Rural Village to Urban Surge (1964), and The Law of Charitable Trusts in Australia (1983). He contributed a number of articles to the Australian Dictionary of Biography including the one on James Clow.

According to Kim Rubenstein, Bradshaw was largely responsible for forcing Joan Montgomery into early retirement as Principal of Presbyterian Ladies' College, Melbourne.

A. Donald Macleod notes that,

Bradshaw had friends and detractors. Some found him negative and power-seeking, his legalisms petty and distracting. Others described him as "unostentatious, warm-hearted and humble."
