= Christ College (Sydney) =

Coordinates: 33°52′48.26″S 151°6′22.68″E

- Motto: To glorify God by preparing leaders for God's church and its gospel-centred mission in the world, enabling God's people to live for Christ in all of life.
- Type: Private, Christian
- Established: 1873
- Principal: Rev Dr Ian Smith
- Location: Sydney, Australia
- Campus: Burwood, New South Wales, Australia
- Website: www.christcollege.edu.au

Christ College, formerly known as the Presbyterian Theological Centre, is the theological college of the Presbyterian Church of Australia in New South Wales. It provides theological education for ministry candidates and members of the laity. It is an approved teaching institution of the Australian College of Theology.

The other theological colleges of the Presbyterian Church of Australia are the Presbyterian Theological College in Melbourne, the Queensland Theological College (formerly the Consortium of Reformed Colleges) in Brisbane.

== History ==
The Presbyterian Church of New South Wales established the theological hall in 1873, to train Presbyterian ministers in accordance with the Westminster Confession of Faith, including the Presbyterian Church of Australia's later Declaratory Statement of 1901. It was located in St Andrew's College at the University of Sydney, and from the early 1920s co-operated with the Methodist and Congregational colleges under the United Faculty of Theology. In 1987 the then Presbyterian Training Centre moved to Shaftesbury Road Burwood, was renamed as the Presbyterian Theological Centre, Burwood and expanded its scope to include training of the laity, as well as elders, missionaries, deaconesses, chaplains, church planters, and youth workers.

The dean of the college in the early years in Burwood was John Davies, who served as principal and lecturer in Hebrew and Old Testament exegesis. In 2010 Ian Smith took over from Davies as principal. The institution was renamed Christ College in 2014.

== Degrees and programs ==
The college is accredited to offer the following degrees in various forms. The following are the flagship programs at the college.

- Diploma of Theology (DipTh)/Diploma of Ministry (DipMin)
- Bachelor of Theology (Th.B.)/Bachelor of Ministry (B.Min.)
- Graduate Diploma of Theology (GradDipTh)/Graduate Diploma of Divinity (GradDipDiv)
- Master of Divinity (M.Div.)
- Master of Arts in Theology (MA)
- Master of Theology (Th.M.)
- Doctor of Ministry (D.Min.)
- Doctor of Theology (Th.D.)
- Doctor of Philosophy (Ph.D.)

For the training of candidates for ordination in the Presbyterian Church of Australia, the college offers a 4-year training program that goes beyond the typical Master of Divinity program.

The college is also in partnership with a number of groups and organisations to offer ministry skill-specific training.

- Redeemer City to City: Incubator Program for the training of church planters
- Jericho Road: Chaplaincy Program for the training of chaplains working in hospitals, school, army, and the like
- Ministry Training for Women

== Guest lecturers ==
The college also hosts annual intensives taught by eminent pastor-theologians. Some of these include Chad Van Dixhoorn, Scott Rae, Michael Horton, Don Carson, Bryan Chapell, and Carl Trueman.

== Facilities ==
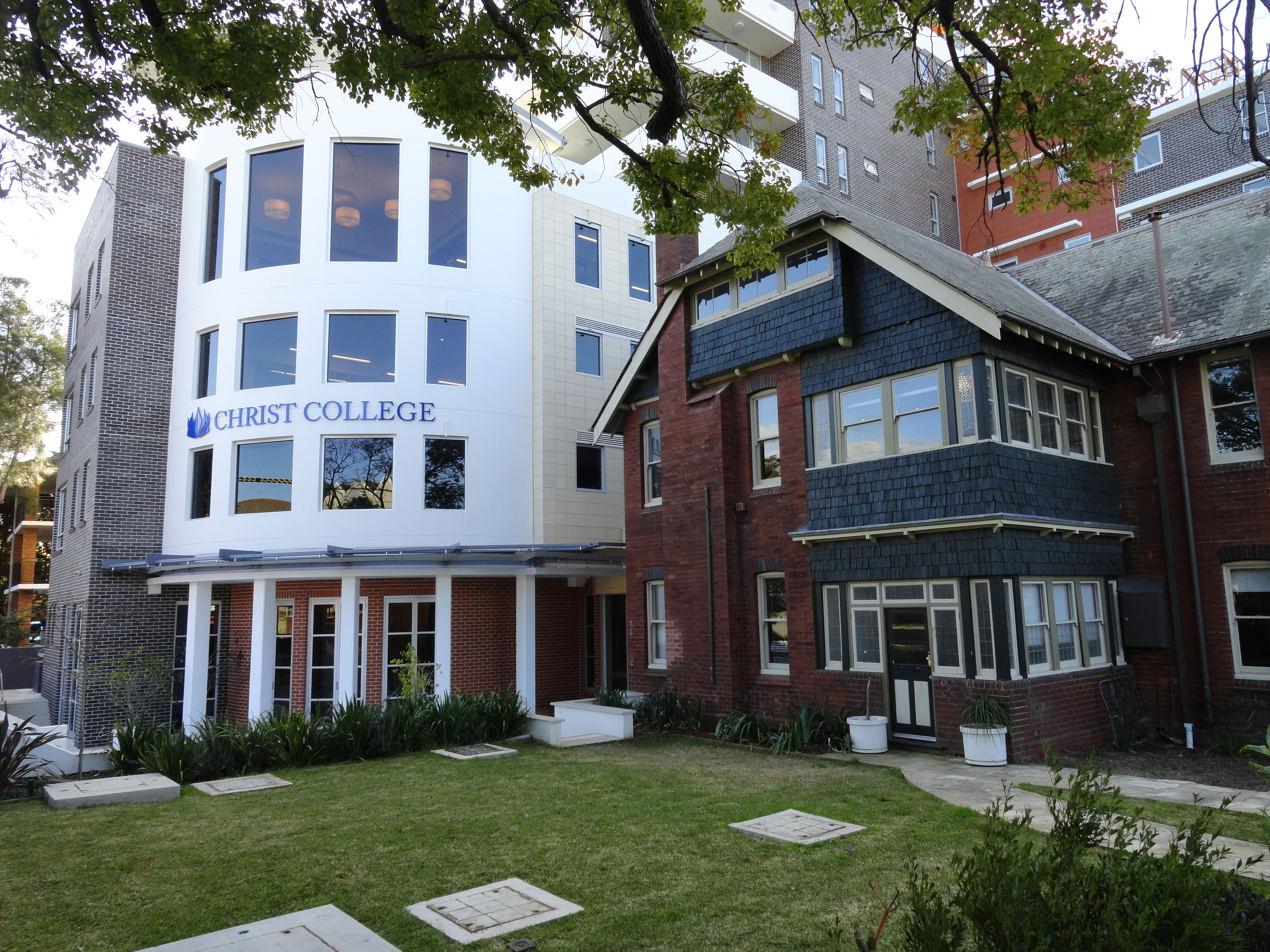
Christ College

The college building, completed in early 2014, consists of a large community area and an auditorium which can seat over 200. There are five purpose built class rooms and a library with over 45,000 volumes (and great views of the city of Sydney). The administration building is a restored heritage building and is connected to new building. Australian Presbyterian World Mission (APWM) also has offices in the building.

== Students ==
The Presbyterian Theological Centre has more than 150 students, both male and female. The college also admits members of other denominations for theological training.

The Students' Representative Council represents the students of the college, with responsibility for fostering community spirit, service to each other, and improving student resources
