= Alan Cameron Watson =

New Zealand Presbyterian minister (1900–1976)

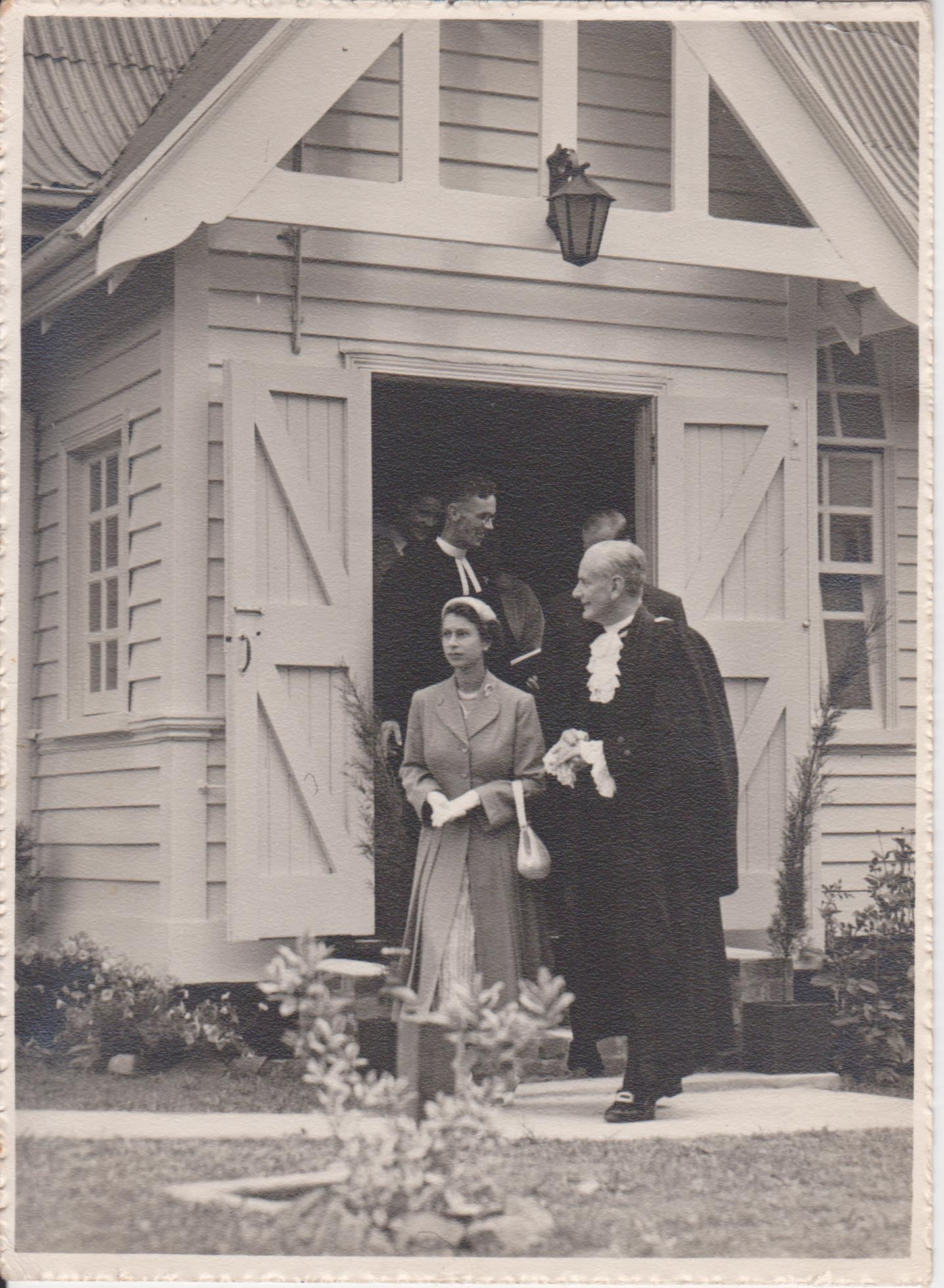
Alan Watson, in his capacity as Moderator of the Presbyterian Church of Victoria, accompanying Elizabeth II as she leaves Warburton Presbyterian Church during the 1954 Royal Tour of Australia.

Alan Cameron Watson CMG (16 March 1900 – 15 January 1976) was a New Zealand-Australian Presbyterian minister.

Watson was born in Feilding, New Zealand and educated at the University of Otago. He was ordained to the ministry of the Presbyterian Church of New Zealand in 1925 and served in Dunedin, East Taieri, and Christchurch. In 1942 he emigrated to Australia and became minister of Toorak Presbyterian Church in Melbourne. He served as Moderator of the Presbyterian Church of Victoria in 1953-54 and Moderator General of the Presbyterian Church of Australia from 1959 to 1962.

Watson received an honorary doctorate from Lewis and Clark College in 1954, and was made a Companion of the Order of St Michael and St George in the 1968 New Year Honours.
