= Australian twenty-dollar note =

Current denomination of Australian currency

Twenty Dollars
- Country: Australia
- Value: 20 Australian dollars
- Width: 144 mm
- Height: 65 mm
- Security features: Window, Watermark
- Material used: Polymer
- Years of printing: 1994–1998, 2002–2003, 2005–2008, 2010, 2013, 2019–2022

Obverse
- Design: Mary Reibey
- Designer: emerystudio
- Design date: 9 October 2019

Reverse
- Design: John Flynn
- Designer: emerystudio
- Design date: 9 October 2019

The Australian twenty-dollar note was issued when the currency was changed from the Australian pound to the Australian dollar on 14 February 1966. It replaced the £10 note which had similar orange colouration. There have been only three different issues of this denomination: a paper note which had a gradient of yellow and red, with a distinct orange background, and two designs of polymer note which can be recognised for their distinct red-orange colouration, and so it was nicknamed a "lobster". The first polymer note was issued on 31 October 1994 and the Next Generation polymer banknote was issued on 9 October 2019.

As of June 2017, 164 million $20 banknotes were in circulation, 11% of the total notes in circulation; worth $3,286 million, or 4% of the total value for all denominations.

Since the start of issuance there have been 14 signature combinations, of which the 1967 issue is of the greatest value, issued for one year only; and the 1989 Phillip/Fraser being issued for less than a year.

From 1966 to 1974 the main title identifying the country was Commonwealth of Australia, there were 146,960,000 notes issued in its life. This was subsequently changed to Australia until the end of the issuance of paper currency for this denomination in 1994 with 1,661,970,048 of these notes being issued.

== Design ==
The people depicted on the paper note issue were Sir Charles Kingsford Smith on the obverse along with five Lissajous curves drawn by a two-pendulum harmonograph, and Lawrence Hargrave on the reverse with his drawings of kites and aircraft designs.

The polymer note features Mary Reibey on the obverse with an early colonial building and sailing ship including her signature. John Flynn (founder of Frontier Services) is on the reverse with features of the Royal Flying Doctor Service of a De Havilland DH.50 biplane Victory supplied by Qantas, a representation of the pedal wireless invented by Alfred Hermann Traeger, Coledge Harland (the man on the camel), who was a missionary to the inland people of Australia (Australian Inland Mission which later became Frontier Services). His signature is included. A compass is in the clear window with the raised 20 lettering. These famous people are depicted against a red-orange background. The note was designed by Garry Emery.

1993–2018 polymer note—obverse

1993–2018 polymer note—reverse

Colouration is said to be either red or orange but has been debated many times over the years. The colour is a mix of both Clinton red and orange and dates back to the first $20 paper note, the mix of colour representing colours of the outback.

The "Next Generation" $20 banknote features the same Australian personalities as the previous design together with other design features. A noticeable difference between the old and new designs is the replacement of Victory with a depiction of a de Havilland Dragon Rapide taking off from a remote homestead in Broken Hill. The new design also retains the traditional red orange colour mix for the note. This note was released into circulation on 9 October 2019.

== Security features ==
The paper design included a watermark in the white field of Captain James Cook, the watermark was also used in the last issue of pound banknotes. A metallic strip, first near the centre of the note, then from 1976 moved to the left side on the obverse of the note. Polymer issue includes a watermark or clear imprint of the coat of arms which is printed over. Embossing or a raised image in the clear panel of the number 20. Also for this issue fluorescent colouring was added to the serial numbers, and a patch that shows the banknote's value. A star with four points on the obverse and three on the reverse which join under light. Raised print and micro printing of the denomination name are included.
