= Reformed Theological Review =

Protestant theological journal

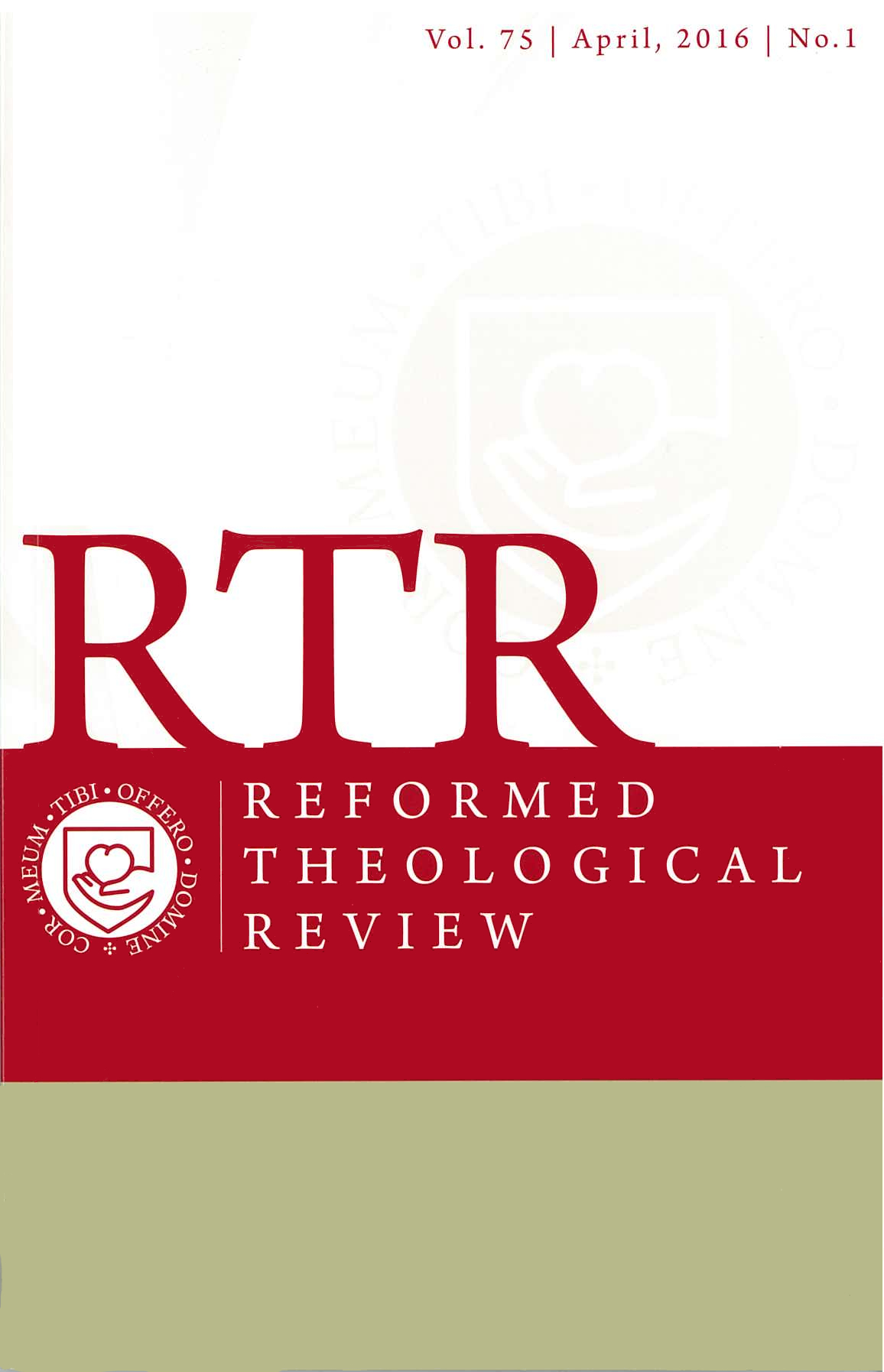
- Discipline: Theology
- Language: English
- Edited by: Jared Hood

Publication details
- History: 1942-present
- Publisher: Reformed Theological Society (Australia)
- Frequency: Triannually

Standard abbreviations
- ISO 4: Reform. Theol. Rev.

Indexing
- ISSN: 0034-3072
- OCLC no.: 1776679

Links
- Journal homepage

The Reformed Theological Review is Australia's longest-running Protestant theological journal. It was founded in 1942, with Arthur Allen, a minister of the Presbyterian Church of Eastern Australia, as its first editor. It stands in the Reformed tradition, and exists to give a scholarly exposition, defence and propagation of the Reformed faith. RTR is a peer-reviewed journal, and is included in the ERA journal list 2015 of the Federal Government's Australian Research Council.

== History and people ==
The Reformed Theological Review commenced publication in 1942. The vision was for an Australian journal that would give a scholarly exposition, defence and propagation of the Reformed faith. Whilst being independently published by the Reformed Theological Society (the Calvinistic Society, formed by Arthur Allen, John Gillies and Maxwell Bradshaw in 1939), RTR has historically had close links to Reformed Anglicanism and Presbyterianism in Australia, and has been associated especially with Moore Theological College (Anglican) in Sydney and the Presbyterian Theological College in Melbourne.

The first editor was Arthur Allen, at that time minister of the Presbyterian Church of Eastern Australia in Geelong. Consulting editors were John Gillies, recently retired from Ormond College, the ministry training college of the Presbyterian Church of Victoria, and Robert Swanton, then minister at Hawthorn Presbyterian Church, and later the first principal of the reorganized Presbyterian Theological College.

The original associate editors were John Aitken, T. C. Hammond, Marcus L. Loane, Allen McKillop, Neil Macleod and Alexander Yule.

The editorial of the first edition stated (November 1942): 'The immediate aim of "The Reformed Theological Review" is a scholarly exposition, defence and propagation of the Reformed Faith, regarded as the purest expression of Historic Christianity.'

Robert Swanton became co-editor in 1944, and continued as an editor (sometimes sole editor) until his retirement at the end of 1988. Over that time, there were various changes of co-editors alongside Swanton.

1948: Barton Babbage, Dean of Sydney, replaced Allen as an editor. Allen had moved to new labours in Sydney, and became an associate editor.

1963: Babbage became an associate editor, leaving Swanton as sole editor.

1970: Donald Robinson, later to be Archbishop of Sydney, became co-editor with Swanton.

1986: Robinson become an associate editor, and David Peterson, then a lecturer at Moore, became co-editor with Swanton.

Swanton retired in 1988, and the first issue of 1989 brought a new cover (the third cover design in the journal's history) and a new editor alongside Peterson, namely Allan Harman, Principal of the Presbyterian Theological College in Melbourne.

The 1989 cover of RTR

In 1996, upon Peterson's move to London to take up the Principalship of Oak Hill Theological College, the then Principal of Moore, Peter Jensen, became an editor alongside Harman. Harman continued as editor until the end of 2013, when he was appointed an Editor Emeritus. Jensen, later the Archbishop of Sydney, continued as a co-editor until the end of 2018, when he was appointed an Editor Emeritus.

There have been various assistant, associate and consulting editors in the journal's history. The first 'assistant editor' was also the first non-minister on the editorial team, namely Brian Bayston, who served in that position from 1960 to 1988. Bayston continues to this day as secretary of the Reformed Theological Society.

The editor as at 2020 is Jared C Hood. The editors emeriti are Allan Harman and Peter Jensen, Other notable associate and consulting editors include Broughton Knox, Leon Morris, and Bill Dumbrell. .

== Catechesis ==
The Society also publishes Catechesis Unlike Reformed Theological Review, it is not peer-reviewed and seeks to be 'more accessible'. It commenced in April 2021. The first editor is Ben Nelson, currently the New Testament lecturer at the Presbyterian Theological College in Melbourne, Australia.
