= Allan Harman =

Australian pastor and academic

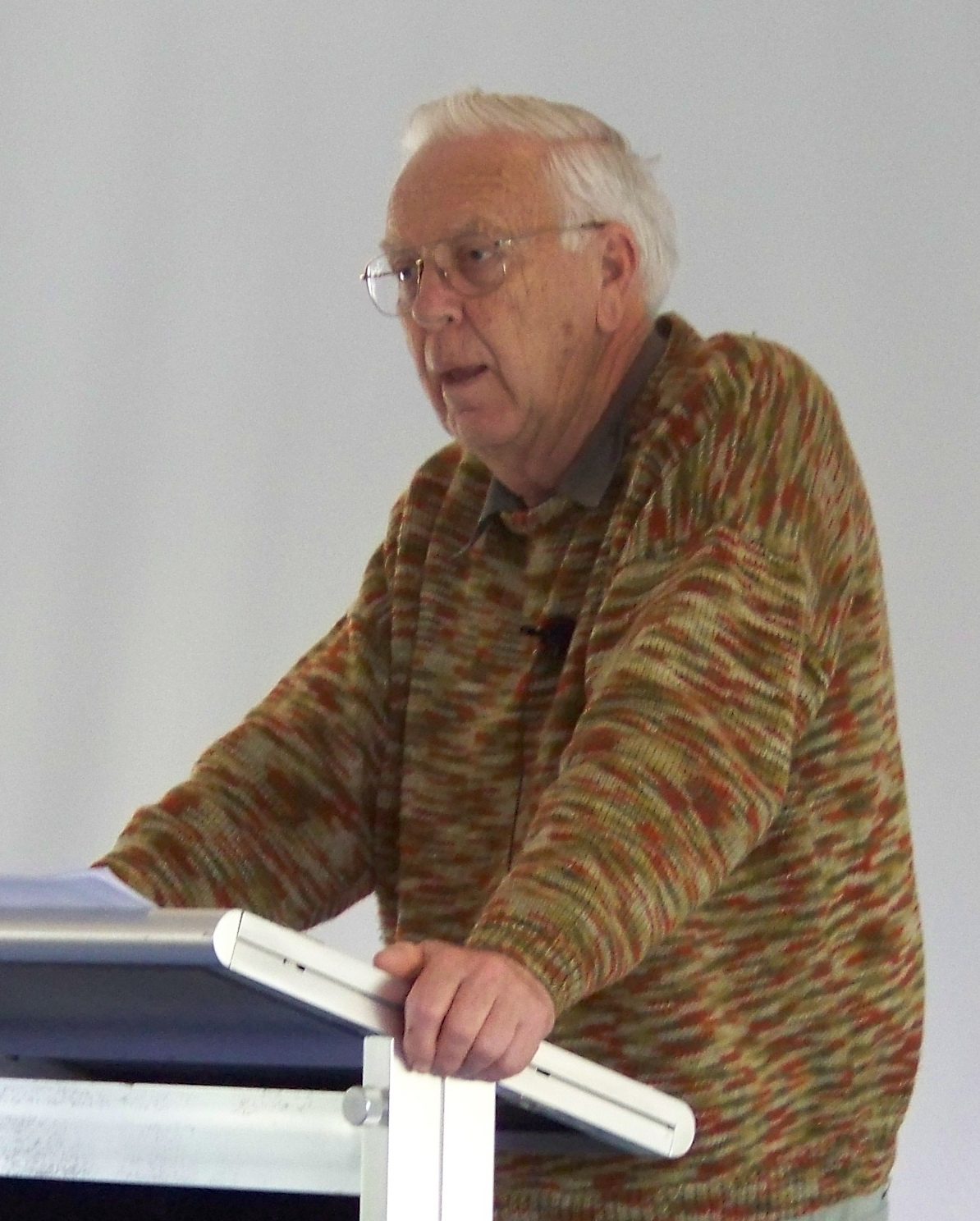
- Harman delivering a speech
- Born: 7 June 1936 (age 90); Lismore, New South Wales, Australia
- Occupation: Theologian
- Spouse: Mairi Harman
- Theological work
- Tradition or movement: Calvinism

Allan Macdonald Harman, OAM, RFD (born 7 June 1936) is an Australian Presbyterian theologian and Old Testament scholar. He has been described as a "well-known and highly regarded figure in Christian and especially evangelical circles within Australia and overseas."

== Early life and education ==
Harman was born in Lismore, New South Wales, son of Rev Joseph Harman, minister of the Presbyterian Church of Eastern Australia and Jessie Harman. Educated at Taree High School and the University of Sydney, Harman graduated with a Bachelor of Arts in 1957. He then studied overseas, at the University of Edinburgh, gaining a Bachelor of Divinity in 1960, and Master of Letters in Hebrew and Semitic Languages, before going on to Westminster Theological Seminary where he achieved a Master of Theology in 1961 and later a Doctor of Theology. In 2003, he was granted an honorary Doctor of Theology from the Australian College of Theology.

== Career ==
After a pastorate of Geelong Presbyterian Church of Eastern Australia (ordained and inducted 21 March 1962) and studies in Philadelphia 1964–66, Harman was Professor of Old Testament at Free Church of Scotland College, Edinburgh, from 1966 to 1974, at Reformed Theological College, Geelong, from 1974 to 1977 and at Presbyterian Theological College(PTC), Melbourne, from 1978 until his retirement in 2001. He also served as Principal of PTC from 1982 to 2001, and is currently research professor at that institution. He has also lectured at Tyndale University College and Seminary in Toronto, Reformed Theological Seminary in Jackson, Mississippi and Kosin University in Busan, South Korea.

Harman served as Moderator of the Presbyterian Church of Eastern Australia in 1978, transferring his ministry to the Presbyterian Church of Australia in 1981, Moderator of the Presbyterian Church of Victoria in 1989–90 and Moderator-General of the Presbyterian Church of Australia from 1994 to 1997. He was a member of the board of directors of the World Reformed Fellowship, and has been an editor of the Reformed Theological Review since 1989. He has been chairman of St Andrews Christian College, Tyndale Fellowship (Australia) and the Australian Institute of Archaeology, and chairman of the Australian Defence Force's Religious Advisory Committee to the Services. He is a recipient of the Reserve Force Decoration.

Harman has written commentaries on Psalms (ISBN 1-85792-168-2), Daniel (ISBN 0-85234-649-2), Deuteronomy (ISBN 1-84550-268-X) and Isaiah (ISBN 1-84550-053-9). He was also one of the translators of the New King James Version.

Harman's wife Mairi was the stepdaughter of A. M. Renwick, and Harman has updated and expanded Renwick's book The Story of the Church.

In 2001, a Festschrift was compiled in Harman's honour, on the occasion of his retirement and 65th birthday. Contributors included Richard Gaffin and Peter Jensen.

In June 2010, Harman received a Medal of the Order of Australia for services to the Presbyterian Church of Australia.
