= Barry Webb =

Australian biblical studies scholar

Barry G. Webb
- Occupation: Senior Research Fellow in Old Testament at Moore Theological College
- Spouse: Alison

Academic background
- Education: Queensland University, Melbourne University, Australian College of Theology, University of London
- Alma mater: Sheffield University (Ph.D.)
- Thesis: (1985)

Academic work
- Discipline: Biblical studies
- Sub-discipline: Old Testament studies
- Institutions: Moore Theological College
- Main interests: Old Testament studies
- Notable works: The Book of Judges (NICOT)
- Website: https://www.moore.edu.au/faculty-members/barry-webb

Barry G. Webb is a scholar and senior research fellow in Old Testament at Moore Theological College in Sydney, Australia. He is the author of a number of scholarly books; foremost is the commentary on The Book of Judges in the New International Commentary on the Old Testament series. Numerous scholarly journals and academic religious periodicals have included articles by Webb.

== Education ==
He earned his B.A. at Queensland University in 1966 and a further Dip.Ed. there in 1967. He went on to Melbourne University and gained a L.Th. in 1973. He studied at Australian College of Theology before earning a BD (Hons) from the University of London in 1977. He gained his Ph.D. from Sheffield University in 1985.

== Career ==
Webb's The Book of the Judges: An Integrated Reading (2008) has been described as a "landmark in the study of Judges".

Webb serves as assistant editor of Reformed Theological Review academic journal.

== Selected works ==
=== Books ===
- Webb, Barry G. (1987). The Book of the Judges: An Integrated Reading. JSOT Supplement Series. Vol. 46. Sheffield: JSOT Press.
- ——— (1990). The Ethics of Life and Death. Explorations. Vol. 4. Homebush West, NSW: Lancer Books. ISBN 978-0-8589-2457-4. OCLC 29421850.
- ——— (1995). Exploring the Missionary Church. Adelaide: Openbook Publishers. ISBN 978-0-8591-0784-6. OCLC 38381989.
- ——— (1993). Responding to the Gospel: Evangelical Perspectives on Christian Living. Explorations. Vol. 7. Homebush West, NSW: Lancer Books. ISBN 978-0-8589-2531-1. OCLC 48999110.
- ———; Höhne, David A. (1996). Famine and Fortune: Ruth. Sydney: Matthias Media. ISBN 978-1-8752-4555-0. OCLC 38408212.
- ——— (1996). The Message of Isaiah: On Eagles' Wings. The Bible Speaks Today. Leicester: IVP Academic.
- ——— (2000). Five Festal Garments: Christian Reflections on The Song of Songs, Ruth, Lamentations, Ecclesiastes and Esther. New Studies in Biblical Theology. Vol. 10. Leicester: IVP Academic. ISBN 9780830826100. OCLC 45104832.
- ——— (2003). The Message of Zechariah: Your Kingdom Come. The Bible Speaks Today. Leicester: IVP Academic.
- ——— (2008). The Book of the Judges: An Integrated Reading. Eugene, Oregon: Wipf and Stock.
- ——— (2012). The Book of the Judges. New International Commentary on the Old Testament. Grand Rapids: Eerdmans. ISBN 978-0-802-82628-2. OCLC 793726631.
- ——— (2023). Job. Evangelical Theology Commentary (EBTC). Bellingham, WA: Lexham Academic. ISBN 978-1683596592.

=== Articles ===
- ——— (1986). "The Theme of the Jephthah Story". Reformed Theological Review. 45 (?): 34–43.
- ——— (1990). "The Song of Songs as a Love Poem and as Holy Scripture'. Reformed Theological Review 49" (?): 91–99.
- ——— (1993). "Reading Esther as Holy Scripture". Reformed Theological Review. 52 (?): 23–35.
- ——— (1994). "Judges". In Wenham, G. J.; et al. (eds.). The New Bible Commentary (21st Century ed.). Leicester: IVP Academic.
- ——— (1995). "A Serious Reading of the Samson Story". Reformed Theological Review. 54 (?): 110–20.
- ——— (2008). "The Wars of the Judges as Christian Scripture". Reformed Theological Review. 67 (1): 18–28.
