= Duncan McEachran =

Duncan McEachran may refer to:

- Duncan McNab McEachran (1841–1924), Canadian veterinarian and academic
- Duncan Stewart McEachran (1826–1913), Scottish minister of the Free Church of Scotland
