= Joan Montgomery =

Australian teacher (1925–2024)

Joan Mitchell Montgomery AM OBE (6 July 1925 – 5 February 2024) was an Australian schoolteacher and principal.

== Early life ==
Joan Mitchell Montgomery was born in Melbourne on 6 July 1925, the eldest of four daughters of Beryl and William Montgomery. She attended Presbyterian Ladies' College in East Melbourne, where she played tennis and baseball. In April 1942, when Montgomery was 16, her mother died and her father's cousin Anne Montgomery came to live with the family; 20 months later, in January 1944, Montgomery's father died and Anne Montgomery assumed responsibility for the four girls.

Montgomery studied at the University of Melbourne and graduated in 1948 with a bachelor of arts degree and a diploma of education.

== Career ==
Montgomery's first teaching position was at Frensham School at Mittagong in New South Wales, from 1949 to 1951. She then taught in London for two years (1952-54), at Tintern Church of England Girls' Grammar School for two years (1955-57) and then in London again in 1958 and 1959. In 1960 Montgomery took up her first position as headmistress, at the private Melbourne girls' school Clyde School, a position she held until 1968 when she moved to the position of principal of Presbyterian Ladies' College. Montgomery retired from the college at the age of 60, in 1985, Kim Rubenstein alleges that she was forced into an early retirement by key figures in the Presbyterian Church of Victoria, including F. Maxwell Bradshaw.

Montgomery served the wider educational community as president of the Association of Independent Girls' School of Victoria and president of the Association of Heads of Independent Girls' Schools of Australia (AHIGSA). During her tenure with AHIGSA she advocated for a merge with the Headmasters' Conference of the Independent Schools of Australia (HMCISA), a move which occurred in August 1985 with the formation of the Association of Heads of Independent Schools of Australia (AHISA). She was also a member of the council of The University of Melbourne, Ormond College and Medley Hall. She was a board member of the Alfred Hospital, Geelong College, Melbourne Grammar School, Woodleigh School and St Margaret's School. Montgomery was elected a Fellow of the Australian College of Education in 1977.

=== Recognition ===
Montgomery was appointed Officer of the Order of the British Empire in 1976 for her services to education; in 1986 she became a Member of the Order of Australia. She was also named on the Victorian Honour Roll of Women in 2004 for her services to education.

== Death ==
Montgomery died on 5 February 2024, at the age of 98.
