= Presbyterian Inland Mission =

Australian missionary organisation

The Presbyterian Inland Mission is the successor in the Presbyterian Church of Australia to the work of the Australian Inland Mission, founded by Rev. John Flynn. The equivalent in the Uniting Church is called Frontier Services.

Presbyterian Inland Mission operates a number of patrols, where members travel between settlements and stations in inland and outback Australia. They proselytize and provide pastoral care and community assistance, including helping dealing with drought and isolation.

In 2020, they purchased a property near Ardlethan to establish as their home base. This property was renamed 'New Dunesk' and provides a range of training programs.

There is one patrol area in Western Australia, two in New South Wales, three in Queensland and one in Tasmania.
