= Bruce W. Winter =

Australian New Testament scholar

- Born: July 2, 1939 (age 87)
- Occupation: New Testament scholar

Academic background
- Education: Macquarie University
- Thesis: Philo and Paul among the Sophists: A Hellenistic and Jewish Christian Response

Bruce William Winter (born 2 July 1939) is an Australian conservative evangelical New Testament scholar and director of the Institute for Early Christianity in the Graeco-Roman World. Winter was warden of Tyndale House at the University of Cambridge (1987–2006), and is currently lecturing part-time in the area of New Testament at Queensland Theological College in Australia], the training arm of the Presbyterian Church of Australia in the state of Queensland.

Winter's academic work has focused on the 1st-century context of the Christian religion in the Roman Empire, about which he has written a number of books and numerous journal articles. He is a member of the Tyndale Fellowship, the Society of Biblical Literature, the British Epigraphic Society and the Studiorum Novi Testamenti Societas.

== Early life and education ==
Winter completed a B.A. in History, Political Science and Biblical Studies at the University of Queensland.

After working for some time in the Australian Public Service, during which time he received a Diploma in Public Administration, he commenced training for ordination at Moore Theological College in Sydney. In 1973, he left Australia and began parish ministry at the Anglican Saint George's Church, Singapore. After three years, he became the warden of St Peter's Hall, part of Trinity Theological College, Singapore. In the years that followed, Winter gained a M.Th. from South East Asia Graduate School of Theology, followed by his Ph.D. entitled "Philo and Paul among the Sophists: A Hellenistic and Jewish Christian Response", through Macquarie University.

== Career ==
Winter later applied for the position of warden at Tyndale House, Cambridge, UK, and was appointed to the position in August 1987. He remained warden until the end of 2006, after which he took up the position of principal of the Queensland Theological College, where he remained until December 2011.

Winter is a former editor of the Tyndale Bulletin. In 2004, a festschrift was published in his honour. The book, The New Testament in Its First Century Setting: Essays on Context and Background in Honour of B. W. Winter on His 65th Birthday, included contributions from I. Howard Marshall, D. A. Carson and Paul Barnett.

== Works ==
=== Thesis ===
- Winter, Bruce W. Philo and Paul among the Sophists: A Hellenistic and Jewish Christian Response (Ph.D.).

=== Books ===
- ——— (1994). Seek the Welfare of the City: Christians as Benefactors and Citizens. First-Century Christians in the Graeco-Roman World. Grand Rapids, MI & Carlisle: Eerdmans & Paternoster. ISBN 9780802840912. OCLC 31434167.
- ——— (1997). Paul and Philo Among the Sophists. Society for New Testament Studies - Monograph series. Vol. 96 (1st ed.). Cambridge, UK: Cambridge University Press. ISBN 9780521591089. OCLC 489872005. - a development of his Ph.D. thesis
- ——— (2001). After Paul Left Corinth: The Influence of Secular Ethics and Social Change. Grand Rapids, MI: Eerdmans. ISBN 9780802848987. OCLC 45247326.
- ——— (2002). Paul and Philo Among the Sophists: Alexandrian and Corinthian Responses to a Julio-Claudian Movement (2nd ed.). Grand Rapids, MI: Eerdmans. - a revision of his 1997 work
- ——— (2002). Roman Wives, Roman Widows: The Appearance of New Women and the Pauline Communities. Grand Rapids, MI: Eerdmans. ISBN 9780802849717. OCLC 52431088.
- ——— (2015). Divine honours for the Caesars : the first Christians' responses. Grand Rapids, MI: Eerdmans. ISBN 9780802872579. OCLC 909883424.

=== As editor ===
- ———; Clarke, Andrew D., eds. (1992). One God, one Lord: Christianity in a world of religious pluralism. Tyndale House Studies. Exeter, UK & Grand Rapids, MI: Paternoster Press & Baker Book House. ISBN 9780951835623. OCLC 25509184.
- ———; Clarke, Andrew D., eds. (1993). The Book of Acts in its ancient literary setting. Book of Acts in its first century setting. Vol. 1. Grand Rapids, MI: Eerdmans. ISBN 9780853645634. OCLC 29743560.

=== Articles and chapters ===
- ——— (1992). "In public and private: early Christians and religious pluralism". In ———; Clarke, Andrew D. (eds.). One God, one Lord: Christianity in a world of religious pluralism. Tyndale House Studies. Exeter, UK & Grand Rapids, MI: Paternoster Press & Baker Book House. ISBN 9780951835623. OCLC 25509184.
- ——— (1993). "Official proceedings and the forensic speeches in Acts 24-26". In ———; Clarke, Andrew D. (eds.). The Book of Acts in its ancient literary setting. Book of Acts in its first century setting. Vol. 1. Grand Rapids, MI: Eerdmans. ISBN 9780853645634. OCLC 29743560.
