= Presbyterian Church of Tasmania =

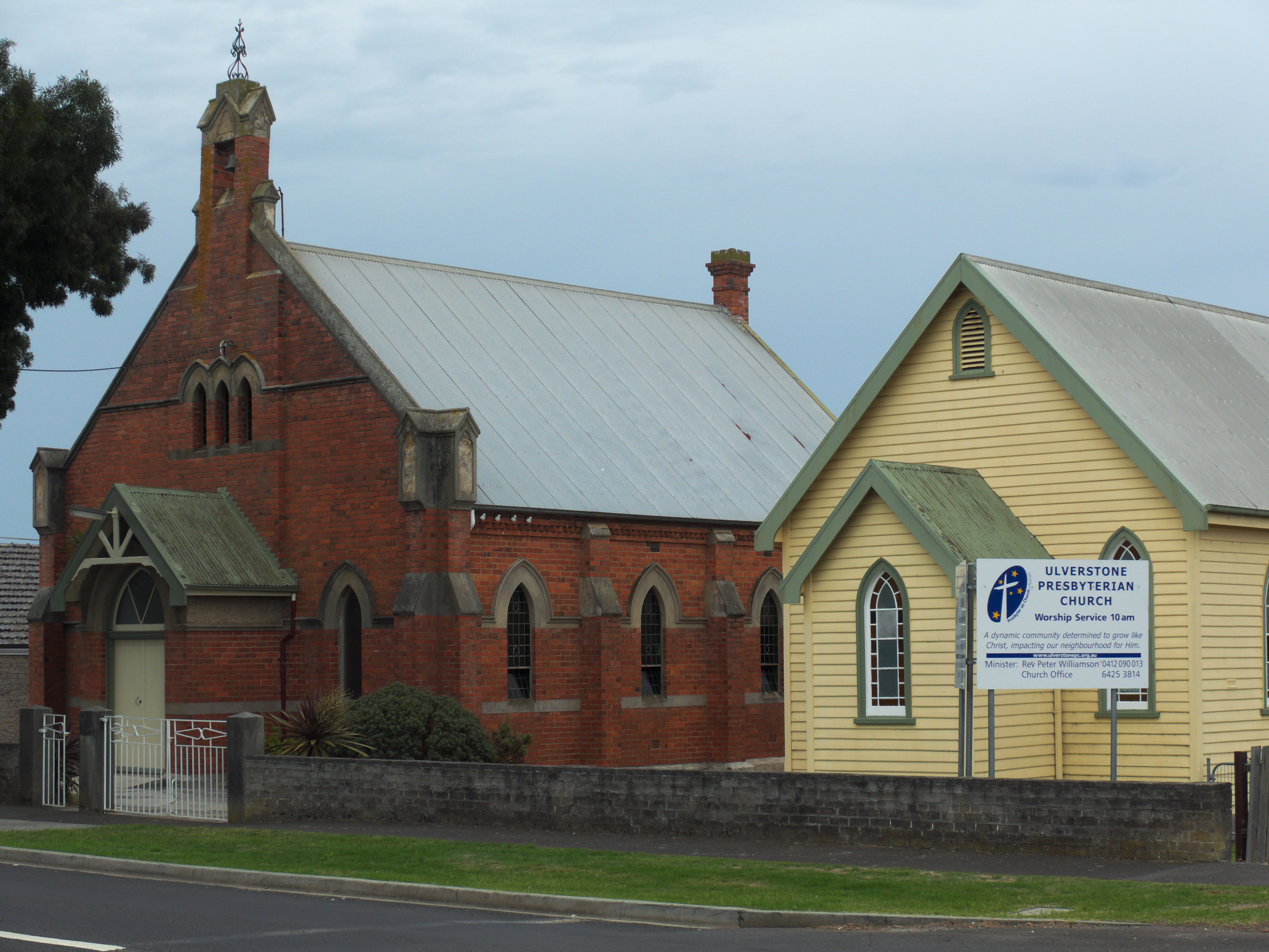
- Ulverstone Presbyterian Church and hall
- Classification: Protestant
- Orientation: Reformed evangelical
- Polity: Presbyterian
- Moderator: Nathan Patrick
- Associations: Formed the Presbyterian Church of Australia in 1901
- Region: Tasmania, Australia
- Origin: 1896
- Merger of: Church of Scotland and Free Church of Scotland congregations
- Separations: 1977 - most congregations joined the Uniting Church in Australia
- Congregations: 14
- Official website: pctas.org.au

The Presbyterian Church of Tasmania is one of the constituent churches of the Presbyterian Church of Australia (PCA). It was established in 1896 as a union of Church of Scotland and Free Church of Scotland congregations. It was incorporated by the Presbyterian Church Act 1896, and became part of the PCA through the Presbyterian Church of Australia Act 1901.

The first Presbyterian service in Tasmania was held in 1823, and in 1835 the Presbytery of Van Diemen's Land was constituted. In 1977, the majority of Presbyterian congregations in Tasmania left to join the Uniting Church in Australia. As of 2023, the Presbyterian Church of Tasmania has 14 churches in two presbyteries, called Derwent (named after the River Derwent) and Bass (named after the Bass Strait).
