= John Flynn Private Hospital =

Coordinates: 28.153879°S 153.488510°E

- Ramsay Health Care

Geography
- Location: 42 Inland Drive, Tugun, Gold Coast, Queensland, Australia

Organisation
- Type: Community hospital

Services
- Emergency department: Yes
- Beds: 345

Helipads
- Helipad: No

History
- Founded: 23 November 1993

Links
- Website: http://www.johnflynnprivate.com.au/

John Flynn Private Hospital is an acute care facility in the southern Gold Coast suburb of Tugun. The 345 bed hospital provides services to people of southern Gold Coast and parts of the Northern Rivers region of New South Wales.

Originally opened as the Moran Hospital of Excellence with the Moran Clinic. The hospital was not successful and was left abandoned by 1991. The hospital was revived by 1993 and renamed John Flynn who was responsible in 1928 for the first outback medical services which became known as the Flying Doctor Service.

John Flynn Hospital complex consists of the main hospital building, specialist medical suites, the John Flynn Cancer Centre, and the hospital also has an onsite 24-hour pharmacy.

== Facility services ==
- Anaesthesiology
- Bariatric
- Cardiac Services
- Chemotherapy
- Dental Surgery
- Dermatology
- Ear, Nose and Throat
- 24-hour Emergency Department
- Endo Alpha Theatre
- Endocrinology
- Gastroenterology
- General Surgery
- Gynaecology
- Gynaecology Oncology
- Haematology
- Internal Medicine
- IVF Service
- John Flynn Cancer Centre
- MRI
- Neurology
- Obstetrics
- Ophthalmology
- Oral and Maxillofacial
- Orthopaedic Surgery
- Paediatrics
- Pathology
- Plastic Surgery
- Radiation Oncology
- Radiation Therapy
- Radiography
- Radiology / Imaging
- Rehabilitation
- Renal Dialysis
- Respiratory Medicine
- Robotic Surgery
- Sleep Disorders
- Urodynamics
- Urology
- Vascular Surgery

== Location ==
John Flynn Private Hospital is located on 42 Inland Drive, Tugun.
