= Duncan Stewart McEachran =

Australian Presbyterian minister (1826–1913)

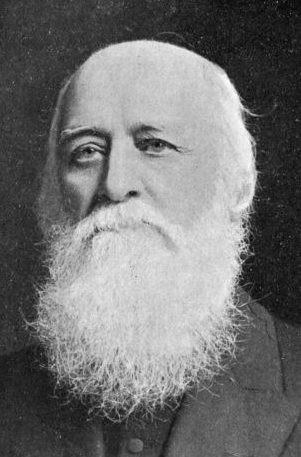
McEachran

Duncan Stewart McEachran (1826–1913) was a Scottish minister of the Free Church of Scotland who emigrated to Australia and became Moderator of the General Assembly to the Presbyterian Church of Victoria.

== Life ==
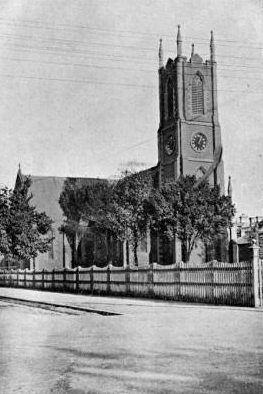
St Andrews Church Melbourne in 1905

He was born in Campbeltown in western Scotland on 27 April 1826 the son of Archibald McEachran and his wife, Ann Campbell. He was educated at Campbeltown Grammar School. He studied for a general degree at Glasgow University from 1840 to 1844 then studied theology at New College, Edinburgh soon after it opened (1844–1848).

He was licensed to preach by the Free Church of Scotland in 1848 and ordained at Portree in March 1850, being translated to Cromarty in 1851. He did not speak Gaelic and had to learn it to preach in Portree. This appears to have failed and was the likely reason for his translation. In Portree he had the use of a small steamship, the "Breadalbane", to do mission work on the islands.

In 1868 he emigrated to Australia with his family, settling in Melbourne taking over St Andrew's Presbyterian Church in the Carlton district. He was assisted in his mission work by Rev William Thomson formerly of Camperdown.

In 1871 the manse was moved from Royal Terrace on Nicholson Street to a handsome new building next to the church with a double verandah. The church was also expanded. The architect for both was Leonard Terry.

He was elected Moderator of the General Assembly in 1885.

He retired on 31 December 1902.

He died at home on Rathmines Road in Melbourne on 5 July 1913. A memorial service was held on 12 July at St Andrews Presbyterian Church, led by Rev Daniel McKenzie of Collingwood.

== Family ==
In 1853 he married Mary Middleton (1833–1860). They had one daughter and four sons but two sons (twins) died in infancy.

Following Mary's death he married Catherine Barbara Macleay Henderson (1832–1911), in 1862. They had six daughters and three sons.

His eldest daughter (by his first marriage) Eliza Middleton McEachran (b.1854) married Evans Harrington Wade in Kew, Victoria in 1877. When Eliza died in 1890, Wade then married her half sister, a daughter of Rev McEachran's second marriage, Ann Campbell McEachran (1866–1959). Ann died at Ferntree Gully.
