= Australian Inland Mission =

Australian organisation of nursing and hospital services

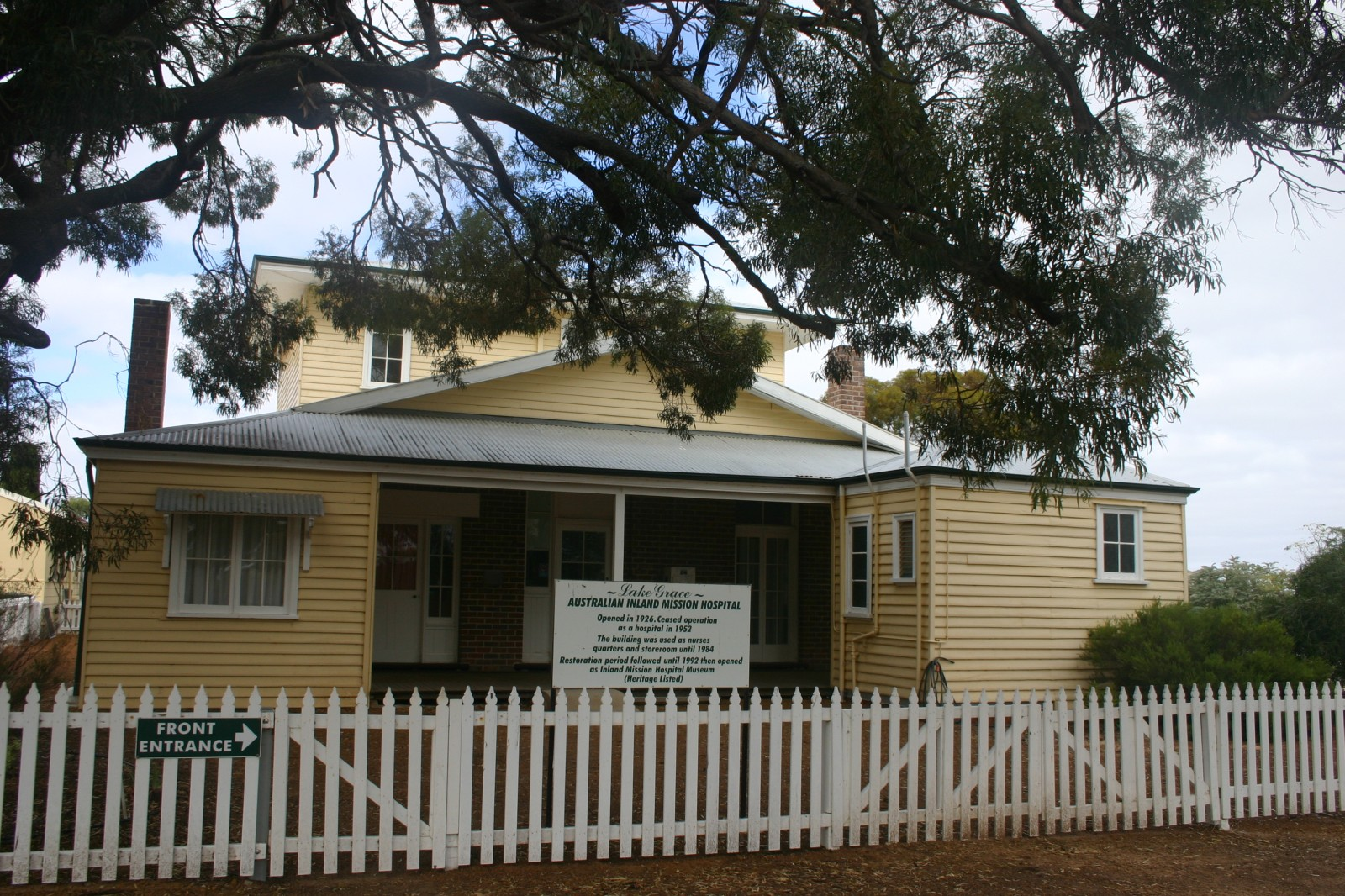
Australian Inland Mission Hospital Museum at Lake Grace, Western Australia

The Australian Presbyterian Mission was founded by the Presbyterian Church of Australia to reach those "beyond the farthest fence" with God's word. It is better known as the Australian Inland Mission (AIM). John Flynn was the first superintendent possessing a vision and dedication to see that "hospital and nursing facilities are provided within a hundred miles of every spot in Australia where women and children reside".

From 1912 the Australian Inland Mission established fifteen nursing homes/bush hospitals in remote Australian locations, including some offices/shelters.

In the 1940s the mission operated Mission Station in Cloncurry with Reverend Allan Brand, who covered an area from Twosnville to the Northern Territory to Cape York Peninsula. His truck carried a full first aid kit, which also acted on occasions as an ambulance and a hearse, as well as a mobile library. Additional to conducting religious services at hotel bars when no other venue was available, he would frequently forceps-remove painful teeth of people. Initially based in Alice Springs before Cloncurry, Brand returned to a Methodist mission in Sydney in 1948.

Following the establishment of the Uniting Church in Australia in 1977, the work of the AIM continued in the Presbyterian Church as the Presbyterian Inland Mission and in the Uniting Church as Frontier Services.

The mission's centennial was celebrated in 2012.
