= Presbyterian Church of Australia =

Largest Presbyterian denomination in Australia

- Logo of the Presbyterian Church of Australia
- Abbreviation: PCA
- Classification: Protestant
- Orientation: conservative Reformed
- Theology: Reformed Evangelical
- Polity: Presbyterian
- Moderator-General: Rev David Burke
- Associations: World Reformed Fellowship
- Region: Australia
- Origin: 24 July 1901; Sydney
- Merger of: Presbyterian Churches of the Australian six states
- Separations: 1967 Presbyterian Reformed Church; 1977 Uniting Church in Australia
- Congregations: 523
- Members: 26,137+
- Ministers: 305
- Official website: https://presbyterian.org.au/
- Source: White Book of the General Assembly of the Presbyterian Church of Australia, 2023

The Presbyterian Church of Australia (PCA), founded in 1901, is the largest Presbyterian and Reformed denomination in Australia. The PCA is the largest conservative, evangelical and complementarian Christian denomination in Australia. The Presbyterian Church of Australia is Reformed in theology and has a Presbyterian polity.

== History ==
=== Beginnings ===
John Hunter (Royal Navy officer) the captain of HMS Sirius in the First Fleet was a former Church of Scotland minister. Later Presbyterian Christianity came to Australia with the arrival of members from a number of Presbyterian denominations in Great Britain at the end of the 18th century. The Presbyterian missionaries played an important role to spread the faith in Australia. Since then Presbyterianism grew to the fourth largest Christian faith in the country.

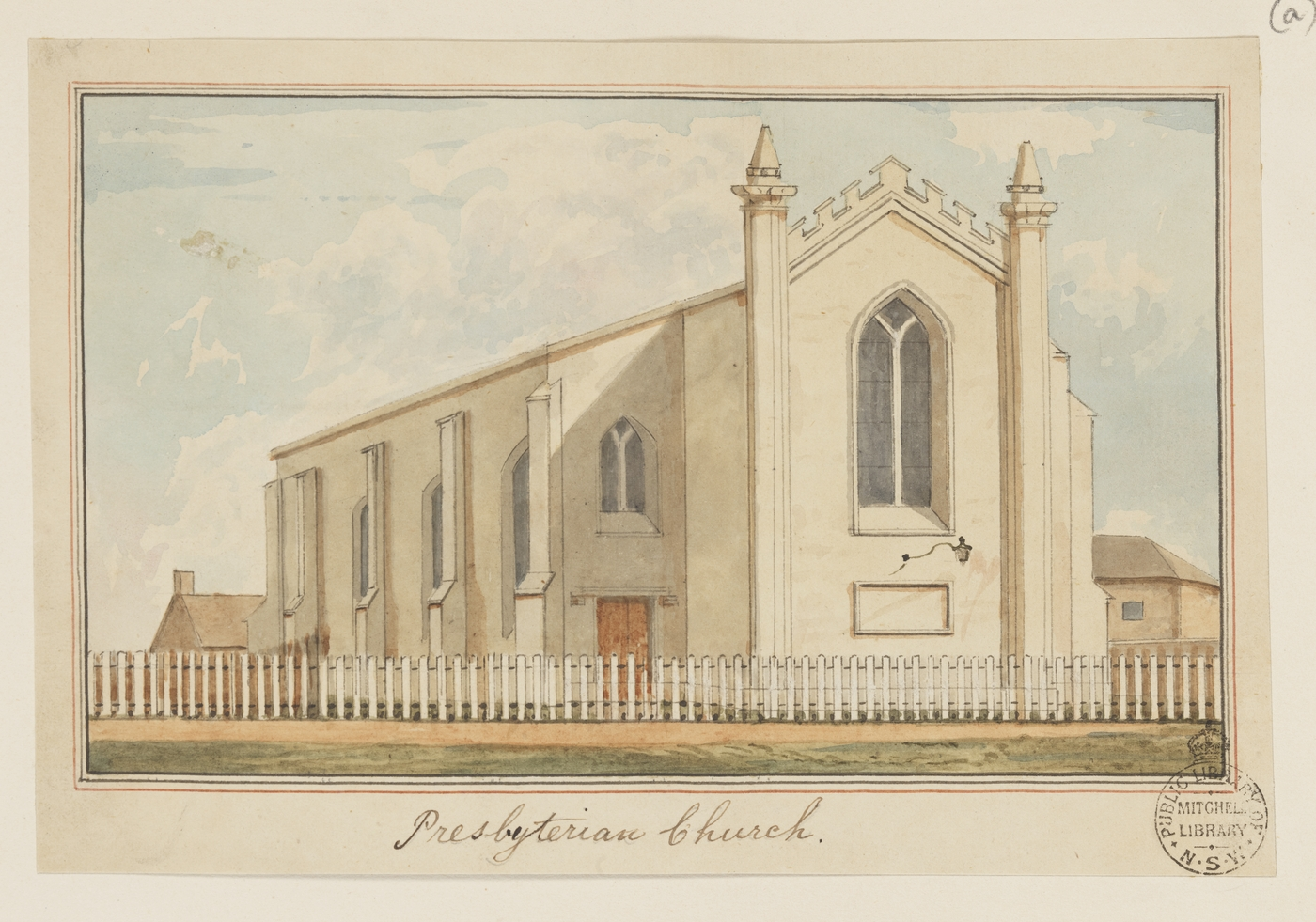
St Andrew's Presbyterian Church, Sydney, 1840s

The Presbyterian Church of Australia was formed when Presbyterian churches from various Australian states federated in 1901. The churches that formed the Presbyterian Church of Australia were the Presbyterian churches of New South Wales, Victoria, Queensland, South Australia, Tasmania and Western Australia. These state churches were (and still are) incorporated by separate acts of Parliament (i.e. by the respective state parliaments) for property holding purposes (these acts are known as Property Trust Acts).

=== Church union ===
People who identify as Presbyterian or Reformed as a percentage of the total population in Australia divided geographically by statistical local area, as of the 2011 census

In 1977, 70% of the Presbyterian Church of Australia together with nearly all the membership of the Congregational Union of Australia and the Methodist Church of Australasia, joined to form the Uniting Church in Australia. Much of the 30% who did not join the Uniting Church did not agree with its liberal views, although a number remained because of cultural connections. Today all PCA churches are conservative.

=== After the union ===
Before the union the Presbyterian Church of Australia was liberal, but the continuing Presbyterian Church became increasingly conservative. A resurgence of traditional Reformed theology took place. In 1982 the denomination withdrew from the largely liberal World Communion of Reformed Churches and later joined the conservative World Reformed Fellowship. In 1987 a new hymnbook was introduced. In 1991 the General Assembly of the Presbyterian Church in Australia repealed the approval of the ordination of women. Women elders continue in some states. The heresy trial of Peter Cameron in 1993 upheld historic Reformed beliefs. The church is active in missions with about 130 missionaries working around the world, including Korea, the Pacific and Myanmar.

== Statistics ==
The Presbyterian Church of Australia has over 26,000 adults and children within 523 congregations with more than 300 ministers serving in congregational roles.

At the 2016 Commonwealth Census nearly 540,000 people identified as Presbyterian/Reformed, representing 2.3% of the population. However the 2021 Census recorded a 36.9% drop with 414,882 respondents identifying as Presbyterian/Reformed representing 1.6% of Australia's population. This makes Presbyterianism Australia's fifth largest Christian denomination, although not all Presbyterians are members of the Presbyterian Church of Australia. See also List of Presbyterian Denominations in Australia.

== Church organisations ==
The Presbyterian Church of Australia's missionary organisation is the Australia Presbyterian World Mission. The organisation has more than 170 cross-cultural missionaries.

The Presbyterian Church of Australia has established Arabic, Chinese, Cook Islands, Indonesian, Japanese, Korean, Samoan and Sudanese congregations, as well as a deaf Presbyterian Church.

The Presbyterian Inland Mission continues the work of the Australian Inland Mission founded by John Flynn in 1912. Padres patrol outback Queensland, New South Wales, South Australia and Western Australia, and hopes to expand into the Northern Territory and Tasmania when resources become available.

The Presbyterian Church of Australia publishes the monthly Australian Presbyterian magazine and provides social and educational services.

=== Schools ===
The following schools have links with or are run by the Presbyterian Church of Australia. The closeness and formality of association varies.

==== Australian Capital Territory ====
- Covenant College, Tuggeranong

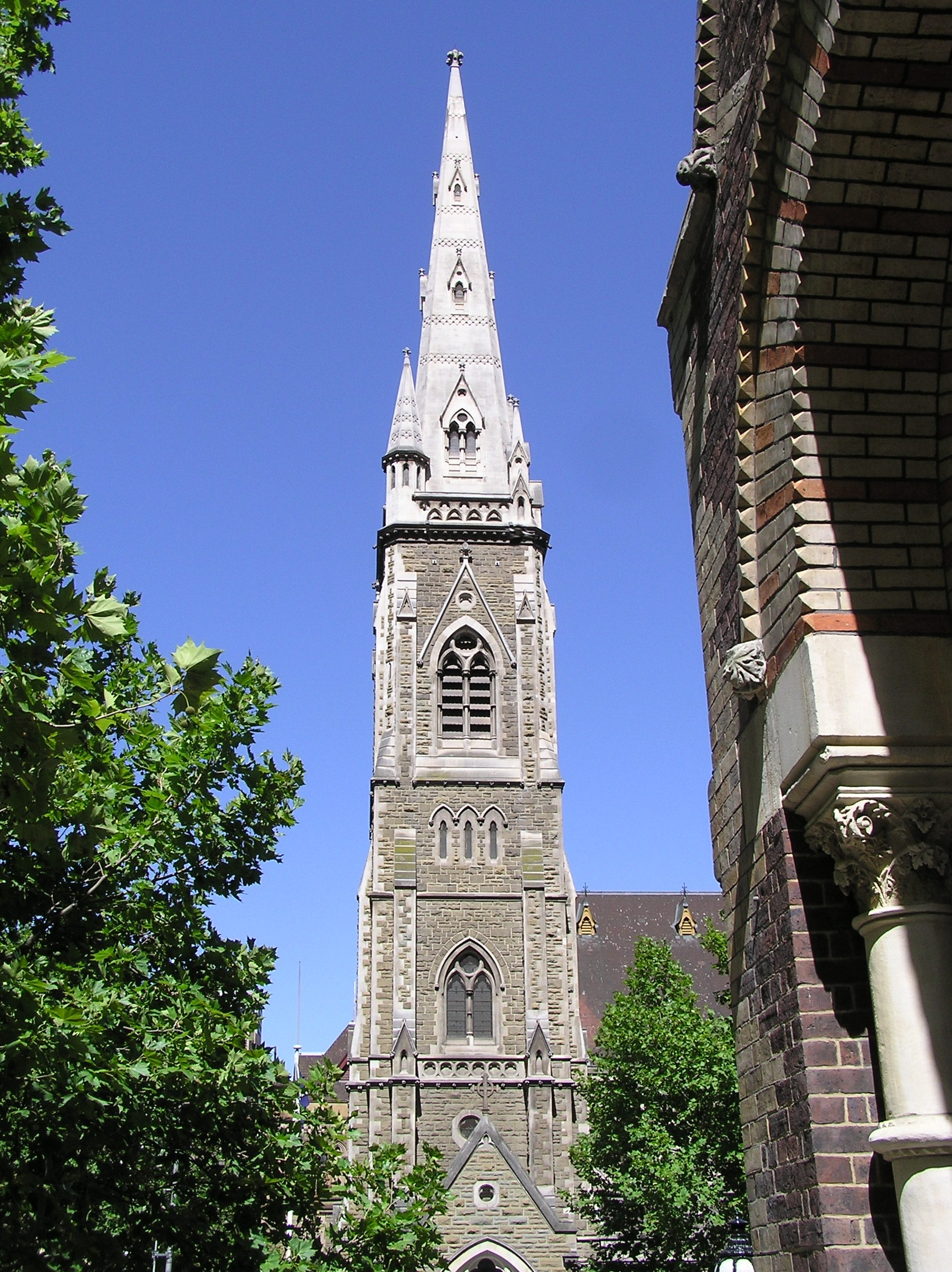
Scots' Church, Melbourne's Gothic tower

==== New South Wales ====
- Cooerwull Academy, Lithgow (now closed)
- Presbyterian Ladies' College, Armidale
- Presbyterian Ladies' College, Sydney, Croydon
- Pymble Ladies' College (formerly; now administered by the Uniting Church in Australia)
- The Scots College, Sydney
- The Scots School, Bathurst
- St Andrew's Christian School, Grafton
- Nambucca Valley Christian Community School, Nambucca Heads

==== Queensland ====
- Fairholme College, Toowoomba

The following schools in Queensland are conducted by
the Presbyterian and Methodist Schools Association.

- Brisbane Boys' College, Toowong
- Clayfield College, Clayfield
- Somerville House, South Brisbane
- Sunshine Coast Grammar School, Sunshine Coast

==== Victoria ====
- Belgrave Heights Christian School, Belgrave Heights
- King's College, Warrnambool
- Presbyterian Ladies' College, Melbourne
- St Andrew's Christian College, Wantirna
- Scotch College, Melbourne

=== Theological colleges ===
The PCA currently has three colleges, based in Australia's three largest cities: the Queensland Theological College in Brisbane, Christ College in Sydney and the Presbyterian Theological College in Melbourne. Trinity Theological College, Perth, though independent, is also recognised as a theological training institution.

=== Bookshops ===
The Presbyterian Church operates the Reformers Bookshop in Sydney (as a joint venture with Stanmore Baptist Church) and the PTC Media Centre – part of the Presbyterian Theological College in Melbourne.

== Beliefs ==
Crest of the Presbyterian Church of Australia

Ministers and elders of the Presbyterian Church of Australia are required to agree to the Westminster Confession of Faith as their subordinate authority under the Bible.

"Along with other true Christian churches, the Presbyterian Church believes that the Bible is the infallible Word of God.

As a result of this commitment to the Bible, we uphold the historic Christian faith.

- We believe in one God in the Trinity of the three persons of the Father, the Son and the Holy Spirit.
- We affirm the real historical events of Christ's birth, life, death, resurrection and future return. We look to Him for the forgiveness of sins and eternal life.
- We submit to the Scriptures as the final authority in all matters of faith and conduct.
- We seek to live in obedience to the Great Commandment of the Lord Jesus Christ: 'Love the Lord your God with all your heart and soul and mind and strength, and love your neighbour as yourself'; and we endeavour to fulfil the Great Commission: 'Go into all the world and preach the Gospel.'

The Presbyterian Church is a Reformed and Evangelical denomination whose understanding of Christianity is set out in the Westminster Confession of Faith. So we stress, as the Bible does, God’s initiative in people becoming Christian believers. This stance does not lead to a lessening of human responsibility before God nor does it take away from the importance of mission and evangelism, but rather establishes the conditions under which true human response to Christ can take place.

The Presbyterian Church does not claim to be the only true church. We see ourselves as forming one small part of the Body of the Lord Jesus Christ and we seek to have fellowship wherever we can with fellow Christians who share with us a common loyalty to 'the faith that was once and for all delivered to the saints' (Jude verse 3)."

== Interchurch organisations ==
The Presbyterian Church of Australia belong to the World Reformed Fellowship, which is a conservative association, where Reformed, Presbyterian, Reformed Baptist and Reformed Episcopal denominations, congregations and individuals can also participate.

== Church government ==
The Presbyterian Church of Australia is ruled by elders or presbyters. Presbyterian churches recognise two types of elders: teaching elders (ministers) and ruling elders. These elders meet at a local level in the Kirk Session. Only ordained ministers may preside at Communion, or the Lord's Supper, except in the rare circumstance where the presbytery licenses a ruling elder to do so. Likewise, only a minister can administer Baptism. A board or committee of management handles the material concerns of the local congregation. Deacons may also be elected to provide practical care.

The minister and an elder from each parish have a seat at their regional presbytery and at their state's annual general assembly. The PCA has six constituent state churches: New South Wales (Inc ACT), Queensland (Inc NT), South Australia, Victoria, Tasmania and Western Australia. The General Assembly of Australia (GA of A), composed of commissioners from each presbytery and state assembly, meets every three years. Every year each state's general assembly elects a moderator, while the General Assembly of Australia elects a moderator general for a three-year term.

In 1991, the PCA's General Assembly of Australia determined that only men are "eligible for admission to the Ministry of Word and Sacraments." The rights of women ordained prior to this time were not affected.

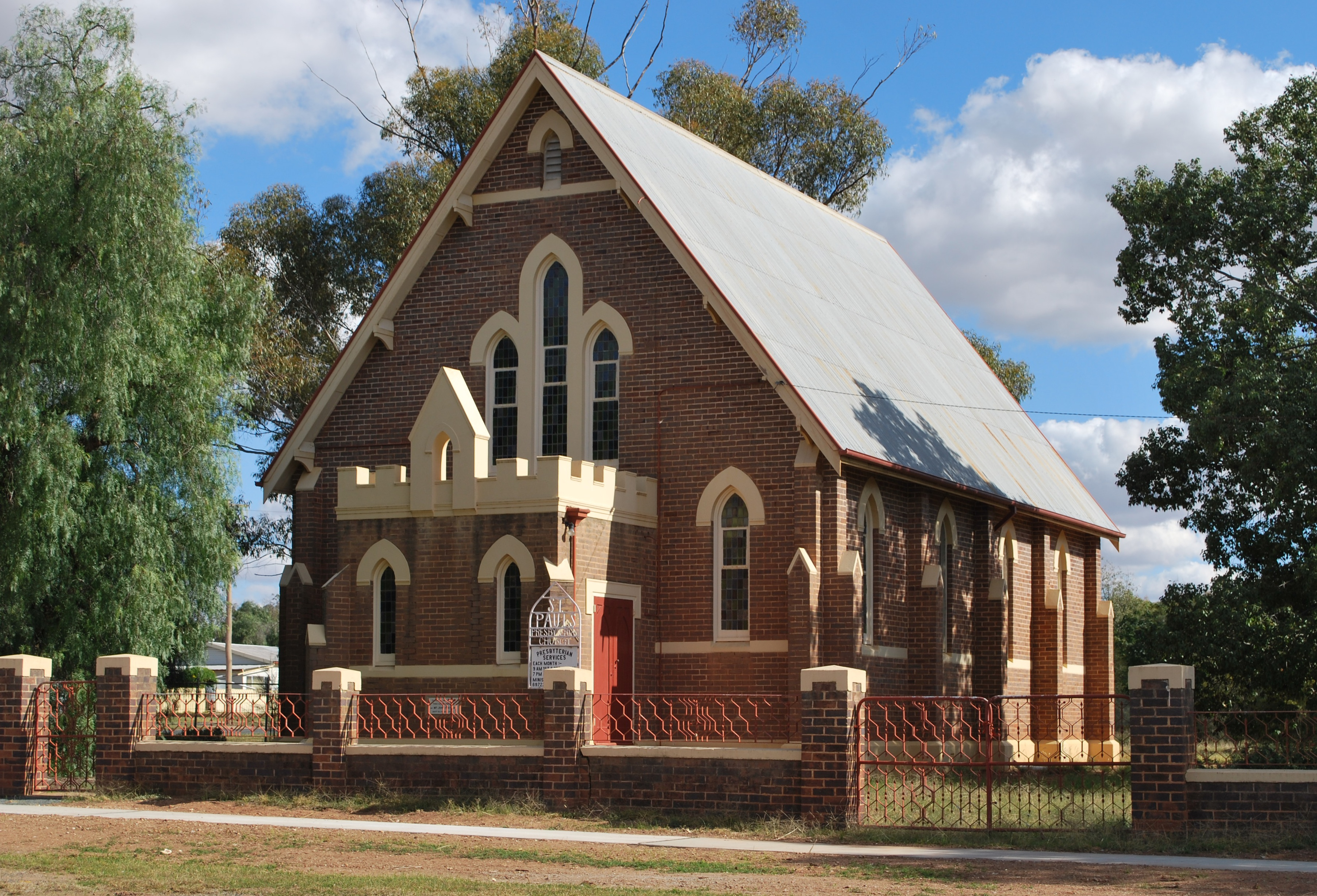
St Paul's Presbyterian Church in Barmedman, New South Wales.

== Australian Presbyterians ==
Current ministers in the Presbyterian Church of Australia include Allan Harman, Iain Murray and Bruce W. Winter. Notable former ministers of the PCA include Peter Cameron, who was charged with heresy in 1993 and subsequently excommunicated.

== Notable congregations ==
- Scots' Church, Melbourne
- Scots Church, Sydney
- Chinese Presbyterian Church
- Malvern Presbyterian Church

== See also ==
- Australian Inland Mission
- List of Presbyterian and Reformed denominations in Australia
- Presbyterian Church of Tasmania
- Presbyterian Church of Victoria
- Presbyterian polity
- Presbyterian Inland Mission
