= Presbyterian Theological College =

Coordinates: 37.7974°S 145.1194°E

- Motto: Doctus in Regno Cœlorum (Latin)
- Motto in English: "Trained for the Kingdom of Heaven"
- Type: Denominational, Christian
- Established: 1866
- Affiliations: Presbyterian Church of Victoria, Presbyterian Church of Australia
- Principal: Jared Hood
- Faculty: Peter Hastie, Jared Hood, Felix Chung, Ben Nelson
- Location: Melbourne, Victoria, Australia
- Campus: Box Hill, Victoria, Australia
- Website: ptc.vic.edu.au

The Presbyterian Theological College (PTC) is the theological college of the Presbyterian Church of Victoria. It provides theological education for candidates for the ministry of the Presbyterian Church of Australia, as well as for members of other Christian churches. It is an approved teaching institution of the Australian University of Theology and is based in the Melbourne, Australia suburb of Box Hill.

The Presbyterian Theological College is an Evangelical and Reformed college which teaches in accordance with the doctrine of the Presbyterian Church of Australia.

== History ==
The Presbyterian Theological College traces its existence to 1866, when the Theological Hall of the Presbyterian Church of Victoria was formed. From 1868 the college was run from Chalmers Church in the suburb of Eastern Hill. In 1871, it was moved to the Old Assembly Hall in Collins Street, Melbourne, then 10 years later in 1881 to Ormond College, University of Melbourne.

In 1974, however, the whole staff of the theological hall opted to join with the Uniting Church. The continuing Presbyterian Church of Victoria opened a provisional theological hall in Hawthorn, with only a handful of staff and students. The college relocated to the top floor of the Assembly Hall building in Melbourne in 1977, and in 1986 purchased its current campus in Box Hill to accommodate increase in enrollments.

The Box Hill campus buildings were approved for renovation and extension in 1990, with the full programme of works completed by 1996 with the expansion of the Swanton Library.

A block of six residential units were opened on the college property in 2008.

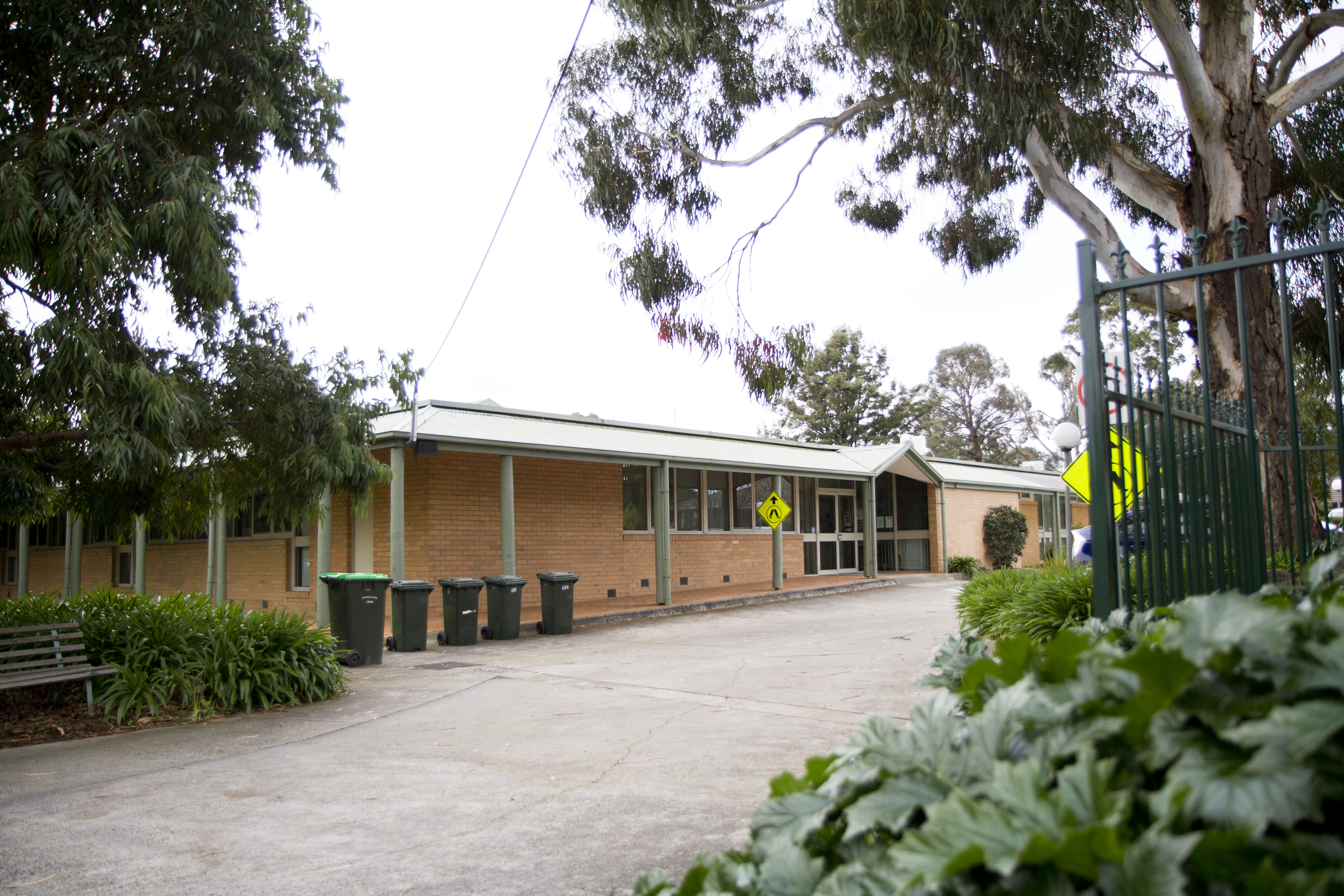
Main building of the PTC's Box Hill campus.

== Governance ==
The operation of the college is vested by the Theological Education Committee (TEC), which is a committee of General Assembly of the Presbyterian Church of Victoria (GAV). The TEC meets regularly at the college.

The PTC is affiliated with the Australian University of Theology (AUT), and is authorised to teach the awards of the AUT on its behalf.

== Principals ==
The first principal of the newly formed college was the Reverend Robert Swanton. He was succeeded by the Reverend Allan Harman in 1982, who served until his retirement in 2001, and then the Reverend Douglas Milne until his retirement in 2011. The Reverend Peter Hastie was appointed as principal for a ten-year term from 2012.

== Courses ==
The PTC offers a variety of undergraduate and graduate qualifications, accredited through the Australian University of Theology (AUT). Qualifications offered include the Diploma of Ministry, Bachelor of Theology (Th.B.), Master of Divinity (M.Div.), and the Doctor of Philosophy (Ph.D.).

While the college's main strength is preparing candidates for full-time ministry as pastors of churches, various courses are available with special focus on mission, counselling, theology, and practical ministry. The college also offers several short courses and intensives throughout the year which are open for audit to the public.

== Presbyterian ministry candidates ==
The college is one of three authorised to train men for the ordained ministry of the Presbyterian Church of Australia. The academic requirements for candidates for the Presbyterian ministry are set by the General Assembly of Australia (GAA) and administered by the College Committee of the GAA. In accordance with the doctrinal standards of the church and the regulations of the college committee, candidates undertake four years full-time training, including the study of both Hebrew and Greek.

== Student life ==
The student association of the college is the John Paton Fellowship, named after John Gibson Paton, a nineteenth-century missionary to the New Hebrides.

Other student groups include the PTC Women's Group, founded to provide fellowship, support and training to the wives and finances of ministry candidates.

Six residential units for students were opened on the college property in early 2008. Accommodation is provided to ministry candidates and other students at a subsidised rate.

== Swanton Library ==
The college's library is named after the Reverend Robert Swanton, the first principal of the PTC. A generous bequest upon his death allowed the library to be funded.

Today, the library has over 32,000 volumes and subscribes to approximately 140 periodicals.

== See also ==
- Presbyterian Theological Centre, the sister college in Sydney
- Queensland Theological College, the sister college in Brisbane
- Australian College of Theology, the accrediting body for most awards at the college
- Presbyterian Church of Victoria, which operates the college
- Presbyterian Church of Australia, which sets training standards for the college
