= John Flynn (minister) =

Australian Presbyterian minister and founder of the Royal Flying Doctor Service

John Flynn OBE
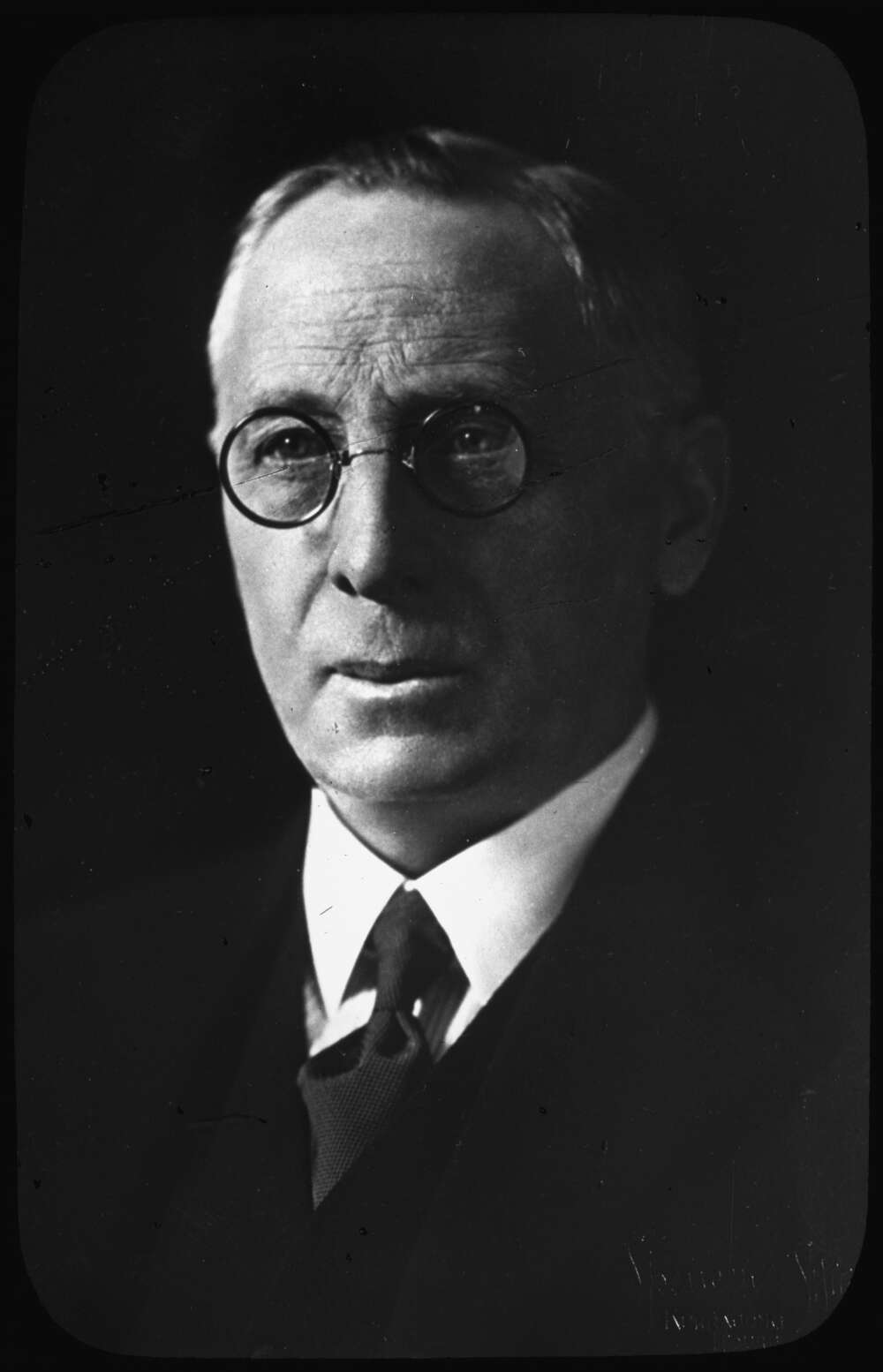
- Flynn in 1929
- Born: 25 November 1880; Moliagul, Victoria, Australia
- Died: 5 May 1951 (aged 70); Sydney, New South Wales, Australia
- Education: University High School
- Occupations: Minister; author
- Years active: 1903−1945
- Organization(s): Royal Flying Doctor Service, Frontier Services and Presbyterian Inland Mission
- Known for: Founder of the Royal Flying Doctor Service; Founder of the Australian Inland Mission
- Spouse: Jean Baird

John Flynn OBE (25 November 1880 – 5 May 1951) was an Australian Presbyterian minister who founded the Australian Inland Mission (AIM) which later separated into Frontier Services and the Presbyterian Inland Mission, as well as founding what became the Royal Flying Doctor Service, the world's first air ambulance.

== Early life ==
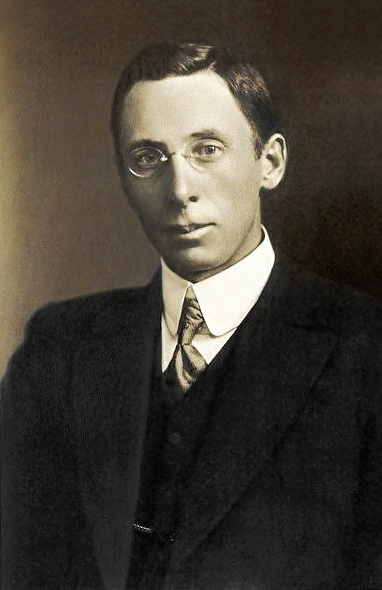
Portrait of John Flynn as a young man, circa 1900-1910

Flynn was born at Moliagul, central Victoria on 25 November 1880. The third child of Thomas and Rosetta Flynn, John was raised in Sydney by his mother's sister after his mother died during childbirth. When he was five, John was reunited with his family at Snake Gully, near Ballarat. The Flynn family later moved to Sunshine in Melbourne's western suburbs. Educated at Snake Valley, Sunshine and Braybrook primary schools, he matriculated from University High School in Parkville in Melbourne, aged 18. Unable to finance a university course, he became a pupil-teacher with the Victorian Education Department and developed interests in photography and first aid. In 1903 he began training for the ministry through an extra-mural course for 'student lay pastors', serving meanwhile in pioneering districts of Beech Forest and Buchan. His next four years in theological college were interspersed with two periods on a shearers' mission and the publication of his Bushman's Companion (1910).

== Ministry ==
Always thinking of the needs of those in isolated communities, in September 1910 Flynn published The Bushman's Companion which was distributed free throughout inland Australia. He took up the opportunity to succeed E. E. Baldwin as the Smith of Dunesk Missioner at Beltana, a tiny settlement 500 kilometres north of Adelaide. He was ordained in Adelaide for this work in January 1911. The missioners visited the station properties in a wide radius of Beltana, and their practical and spiritual service was valued in the isolated localities. Flynn used it as an opportunity to look at the potential for something bigger. By 1912, after writing a report for his church superiors on the difficulties of ministering to such a widely scattered population, Flynn was made the first superintendent of the Australian Inland Mission which in 1977 was divided into two organisations becoming Frontier Services. and the Presbyterian Inland Mission. Flynn's vision was to establish a 'Mantle of Safety' for the people of Outback Australia. As well as tending to spiritual matters, Flynn quickly established the need for medical care for residents of the vast Australian outback, and established a number of bush hospitals.

By 1917, Flynn was already considering the possibility of new technology, such as radio and aircraft, to assist in providing a more useful acute medical service, and then received a letter from an Australian pilot serving in World War I, Clifford Peel, who had heard of Flynn's speculations and outlined the capabilities and costs of then-available planes. This material was published in the church's magazine, the start of Flynn turning his considerable fund-raising talents to the task of establishing a flying medical service. The first flight of the Aerial Medical Service was in 1928 from Cloncurry, Queensland. A museum commemorating the founding of the Royal Flying Doctor Service is located at John Flynn Place in Cloncurry.

== Marriage ==
Flynn married the secretary of the AIM, Jean Blanch Baird, on 7 May 1932 at the Presbyterian Church in Ashfield, Sydney. He was 51 years old and the marriage reportedly came as a surprise even to his close friends.

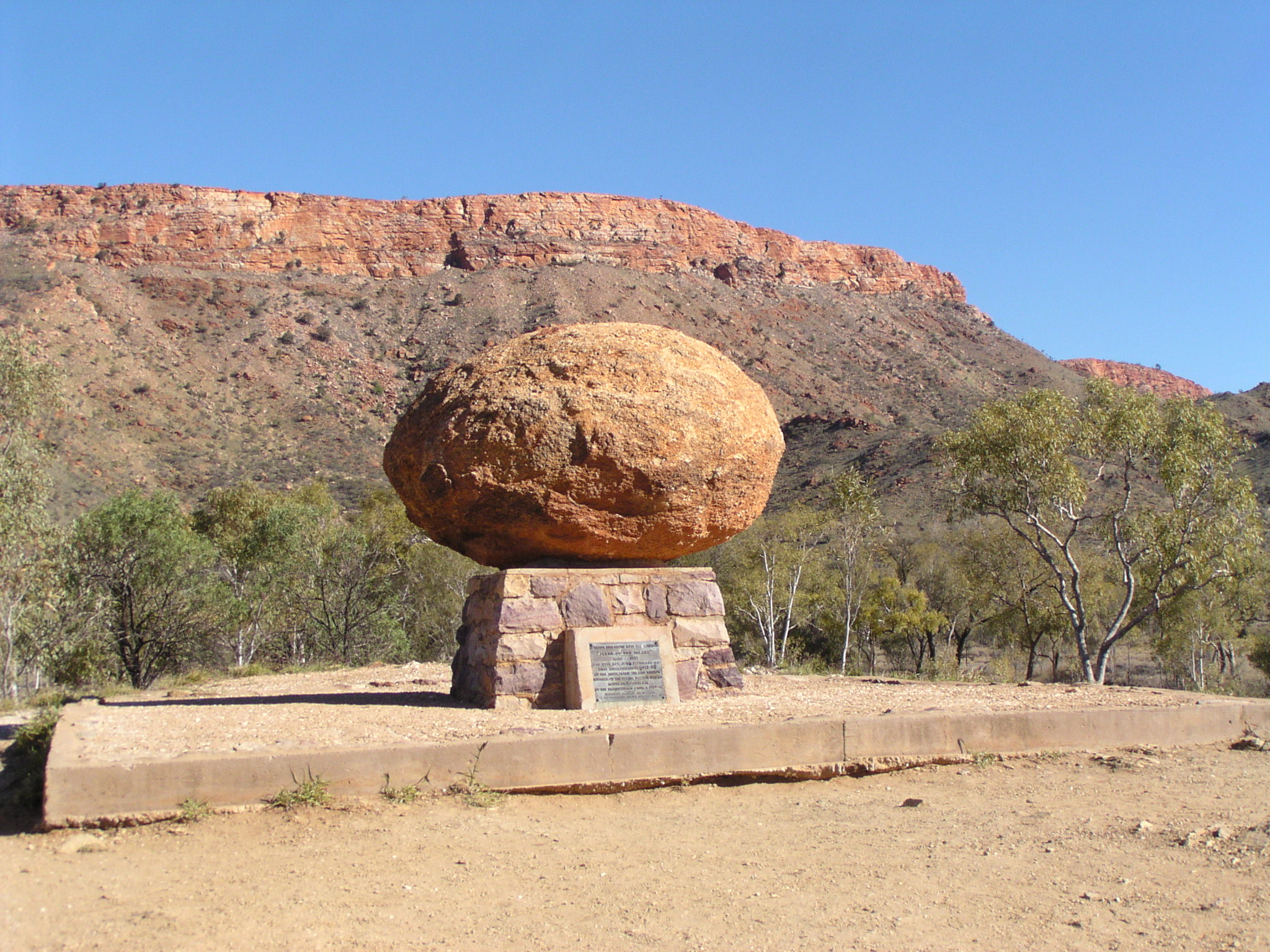
Flynn's grave, near Alice Springs.

== Death ==
He retired and died in Sydney on 5 May 1951. He was 70 years old. He was cremated and his remains were placed under a large boulder from the Devils Marbles. The Northern Territory Department of Public Works had taken the rock from a site sacred to its traditional owners, but after many years of negotiations the rock was returned to its original location in 1998. It was replaced with one acceptable to the Aboriginal people, both of the original rock's home and the people on whose land his grave lies.

The land adjoining the grave site was proclaimed as a reserve on 21 March 1957 and became a historical reserve known as the John Flynn's Grave Historical Reserve on 30 June 1978.

His widow Jean died at the Pitt Wood Presbyterian nursing home in Ashfield, Sydney, New South Wales on 27 August 1976.

== Awards ==
Flynn was appointed an Officer of the Order of the British Empire in 1933.

== Legacy ==
The work of the Australian Inland Mission (AIM) is continued today through the Uniting Church of Australia's Frontier Services and the Presbyterian Church of Australia's Presbyterian Inland Mission. The Royal Flying Doctor Services still continues to deliver Flynn's vision of a 'Mantle of Safety' to the people of outback Australia.

== Commemoration ==
Flynn is featured on the reverse of the polymer Australian twenty-dollar note.

Flynn's name has also been adopted in commemoration of him, including:

- The Alice Springs suburb of Flynn
- The Canberra suburb of Flynn
- The federal electorate of Flynn in Queensland was created by the Australian Electoral Commission in 2006.
- Qantas has announced that they intend naming one of their Airbus A380s after Flynn in recognition of his contribution to the aviation industry and particularly to his achievement of founding the Royal Australian Flying Doctors Service.
- The Australian College of Rural and Remote Medicine has also created a John Flynn Placement Program, which is a scholarship for medical students wanting to experience medical practice in the outback
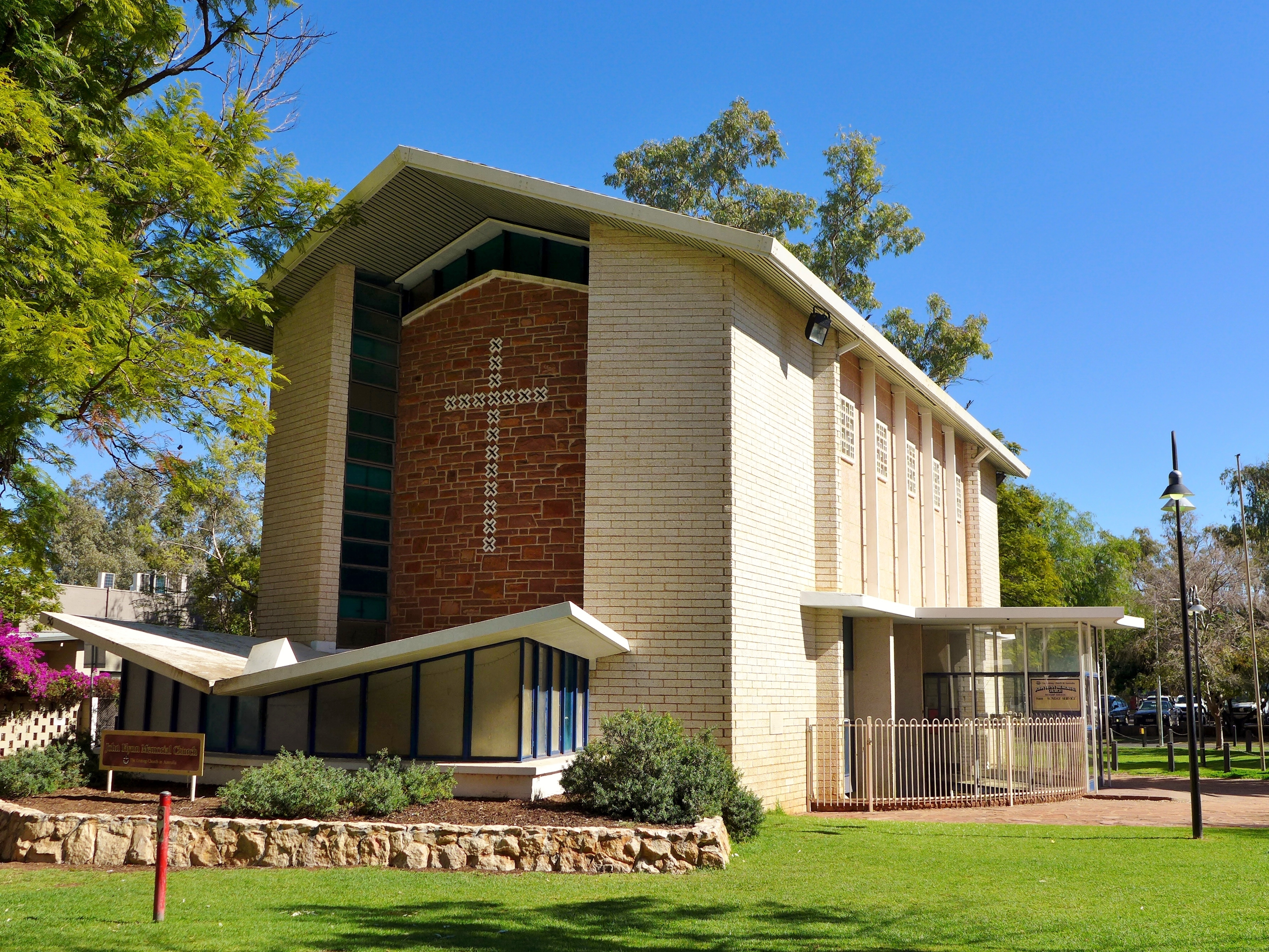
  John Flynn Memorial Church, Alice Springs, 2015
- The John Flynn Memorial Uniting Church in Alice Springs was officially opened by Governor-General William Slim on Sunday 6 May 1956.
- The John Flynn Private Hospital located on the Gold Coast, Queensland
- The school house of Flynn at Brisbane Boys College

Books about Flynn include:

- Ion Idriess wrote Flynn of the Inland in 1932. The book told of Flynn's life and the establishment and running of the Australian Inland Mission.
- Barry Brown, John Flynn and the Flying Doctor Service, 1960
- Allan Drummond, John Flynn, 2012
- Rudolph Ivan, John Flynn of Flying Doctors and Frontier Faith, 1996
- Brian C.Peachment, Aeroplanes or a Grave: The Story of John Flynn and the Flying Doctor Service
- W.Scott McPheat, John Flynn - Apostle to the Inland, 1963
- W.Scott McPheat, John Flynn : Vision of the Inland, 1976
- Everald Compton 'John Flynn : The man on the 20 dollar notes 2016

His life was dramatised in the 1963 radio serial Flynn by Rex Rienits.

A memorial was built in 1952 at the intersection of the Barkly and Stuart Highways about 24 kilometres (15 mi) north of Tennant Creek in the Northern Territory of Australia. It was dedicated on 27 August 1953 by the Governor General, Sir William Slim. The land around the memorial was proclaimed on 4 April 1957 and was proclaimed as the John Flynn Historical Reserve on 30 June 1978.

== See also ==
- Christianity in Australia
