= St Andrews Christian College =

Location
- 130 Tyner Road; Wantirna South, Victoria; Australia; 37°52′26″S 145°14′41″E

Information
- Motto: Glory to God
- Denomination: Presbyterian
- Founded: 1983
- Status: Open
- Principal: Nick Haines
- Chaplain: Rev. Warwick Grant
- Grades: Prep to Year 12
- Enrolment: 658 in 2020
- Slogan: Glory to God
- Song: O Lord Our Great God
- Website: standrews.vic.edu.au

St Andrews Christian College is an independent, co-educational school situated in the eastern Melbourne suburb of Wantirna South. The school was founded in 1983 by the Presbyterian Church of Victoria, and takes students from Prep to Year 12.

The College expresses a Christian and biblical perspective and approach in its curriculum and culture. Currently there are families from over 35 different Protestant denominations attending the College.

The college was the centre of controversy in 2020–22 for its suppression of sexual abuse of students by its former sports teacher and coordinator Steve Mellody, who is a registered sex offender for life. The college also gained notoriety for urging parents to support the controversial religious discrimination bill.

== History ==
St Andrews Christian College was opened in 1983 in Surrey Hills as a response to growing community demand for a Christian school in the area.

The College later relocated its premises to Burwood in 1998, and was able to offer secondary classes in 2000 as student and staff numbers began to grow.

In 2010, the College moved into its current site in Wantirna South, where it is in the process of completing major infrastructure expansions to accommodate its growing population.

In 2013, then Opposition Leader, and later Prime Minister, Tony Abbott and his wife Margie Abbott, together with other dignitaries paid a visit to the College.

== Houses ==
The College has three houses, each of which comprises both students and teachers. Students compete for house points throughout the school year, which are awarded for academic and sporting achievements, as well as for outstanding student behaviour.

The three houses are:

House name	Colours	Motto	Named after
Barton	Red	Strength, Honour, Wisdom.	Sir Edmund Barton, first Prime Minister of Australia
Deakin	Yellow	Iron Sharpens Iron	Alfred Deakin, second Prime Minister of Australia
Parkes	Green	God is Our Light	Sir Henry Parkes, Australian politician and the "Father of Federation"

== Achievement ==
St Andrews Christian College has consistently been listed as one of the top-ranking schools in Victoria and Australia based on academic achievement.

In 2009, St Andrews was listed as one of the top 50 best performing schools in Australia, based on overall academic performance, in both primary school and secondary school categories.

Since 2010, the College has consistently ranked in the top 15 best primary schools in Victoria, placing as high as 3rd overall in 2012.

St Andrews has also been ranked as one of the top 20 secondary schools in the state since 2012, and one of the highest ranked schools that is neither selective nor partially-selective.

Based on NAPLAN results in 2014, the College was ranked as Australia's 46th and 72nd overall best performing primary and secondary school respectively. The College also achieved the 47th best numeracy result, and was ranked the 29th best private primary school and 50th best private secondary school.

Kaushal Ottem became renown for his collaboration with multinational corporations and running two IT companies whilst 16-years-old and at the time studying at St Andrews.

== Controversy ==
=== Steve Mellody ===
St Andrews Christian College gained notoriety when it was featured in news articles describing sexual abuse by the school's sports coordinator, Steve Mellody. The controversy resulted in the dismissal of the sports coordinator who in October 2021 pled guilty to sexually assaulting two students and the child safety officer and head of primary school, Yvonne Hughes. According to the investigation by the Victorian Registration and Qualifications Authority, when Mellody's "inappropriate contact with female students since April 2016" was revealed, the school disciplined him and didn't relay the staff's concerns to Victoria Police. Mellody was instructed by the Head of Middle School, Daniel Lee, to "spend more time in the staffroom, or play sport with male students". In a staff email to the principal, Catriona Wansbrough, in October 2016, Mellody was seen to be "touching a student’s hair" and "returning from sand dunes with a young female student while on a school camp." Lee and Hughes were contacted by staff throughout 2019 about concerns regarding Mellody's interactions with students, however, the concerns were not addressed by either—one of the emails stated "Steve [Mellody] should not allow the students to get so involved with him, and he has been warned before, but it still continues.".

=== Religious discrimination ===
In 2022, the college "told" its staff to sign an "updated statement of belief that 'acknowledges the biological sex of a person as recognised at birth and requires practices consistent with that sex'". Earlier in the year, the college sent a letter to the parents of students urging them to support the religious discrimination bill which was rejected by the Labor-majority Parliament of Australia, arguing that "the rights of families who send their children to Christian schools need protection".
