= Queensland Theological College =

Theological college in Queensland, Australia

Coordinates: 27.502°S 153.009°E

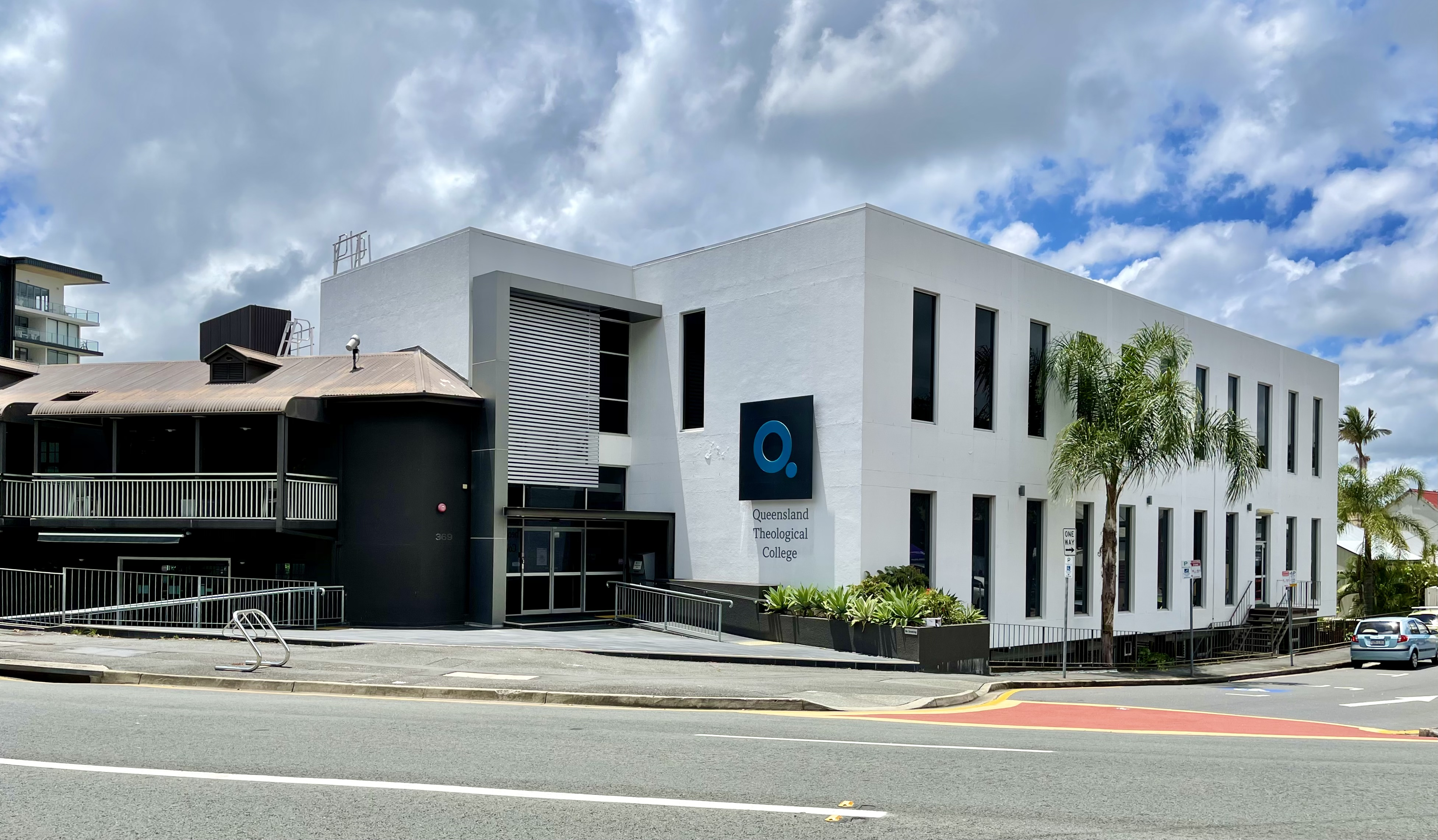
Queensland Theological College (QTC), Seminary in Spring Hill, Queensland

The Queensland Theological College (QTC) is a theological college in Queensland, Australia. Based in Brisbane, it is the training college of the Presbyterian Church of Queensland and takes a Reformed Evangelical or Reformed Protestant stance. The college was established in 1876 and has been known as the Presbyterian Theological Hall, the Reformed College of Ministries and the Consortium of Reformed Colleges. It adopted its current name in 2006. The current principal is Gary Millar, who succeeded Bruce W. Winter in 2012. Millar is also the chairman of The Gospel Coalition Australia (TGCA). Other full-time lecturers at QTC include Andrew Bain (Church History), Mark Baddeley (Systematic Theology), Douglas Green (Old Testament), Nick Brennan (New Testament) and Wesley Redgen (New Testament and Greek) QTC is a member institution of the Australian College of Theology.
