= Presbyterian Church of Victoria =

Presbyterian denomination in Australia

- Classification: Protestant
- Orientation: Reformed evangelical
- Polity: Presbyterian
- Moderator: Rev Ian Hutton
- Associations: Formed the Presbyterian Church of Australia in 1901
- Region: Victoria, Australia
- Origin: 1859; Melbourne, Victoria
- Merger of: The Church of Scotland Synod of Victoria, the Free Presbyterian Church of Victoria and the United Presbyterian Church
- Separations: Australian Church (1885); 1977 - most congregations joined the Uniting Church in Australia
- Congregations: 133
- Members: 6,273
- Official website: pcv.org.au

The Presbyterian Church of Victoria is one of the constituent churches of the Presbyterian Church of Australia. It was established in 1859 as a union of Church of Scotland, Free Presbyterian and United Presbyterian congregations.

The Presbyterian Church of Victoria in the nineteenth century has been described as "the strongest, wealthiest, loudest and most influential of the churches in Victoria." In 1901, it united with the Presbyterian churches of the other states of Australia to form the Presbyterian Church of Australia. From 1901 to 1977, the PCV was the largest of the state Presbyterian churches. In 1977, the majority of congregations left to join the Uniting Church in Australia.

The Presbyterian Church of Victoria accepts the Westminster Confession of Faith as its subordinate standard, read in the light of a Declaratory Statement of 1901. It also subscribes to the "general principles" of the Larger and Shorter Catechisms, the Form of Presbyterial Church Government, the Directory of Public Worship, and the Second Book of Discipline.

The Presbyterian Church of Victoria has entered into formal partnership agreements with the Blantyre and Zambia synods of the Church of Central Africa, Presbyterian, as well as the Presbyterian Church in Sudan.

The PCV operates the Presbyterian Theological College in Box Hill, and exercises oversight over Belgrave Heights Christian School, Presbyterian Ladies' College, St Andrews Christian College and Scotch College in Melbourne, and King's College in Warrnambool.

The Presbyterian Church of Victoria publishes a quarterly magazine called Fellow Workers. The current Moderator of the PCV is Ian Hutton.

== Notable Moderators ==
- James Clow (7 April 1859)
- Adam Cairns (1 November 1859)
- Duncan Stewart McEachran (1885)
- Daniel Macdonald (1896)
- Patrick John Murdoch (1898)
- David Ross (1919)
- Alan Cameron Watson (1953)
- Allan Harman (1989)

== Notable churches ==
- Scots' Church, Melbourne
- Malvern Presbyterian Church
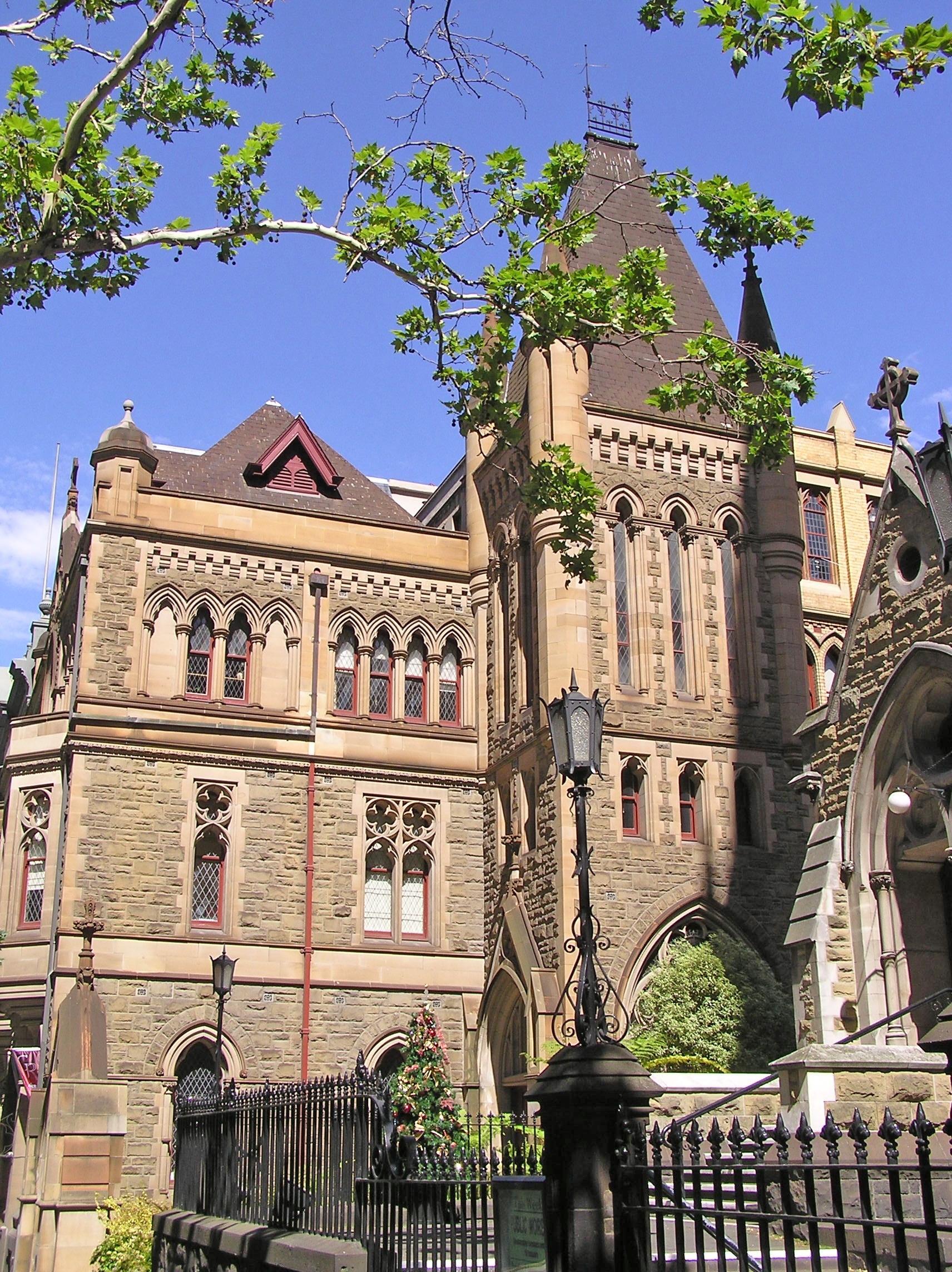
The Assembly Hall on Collins Street is the location of the annual meeting of the PCV's General Assembly.

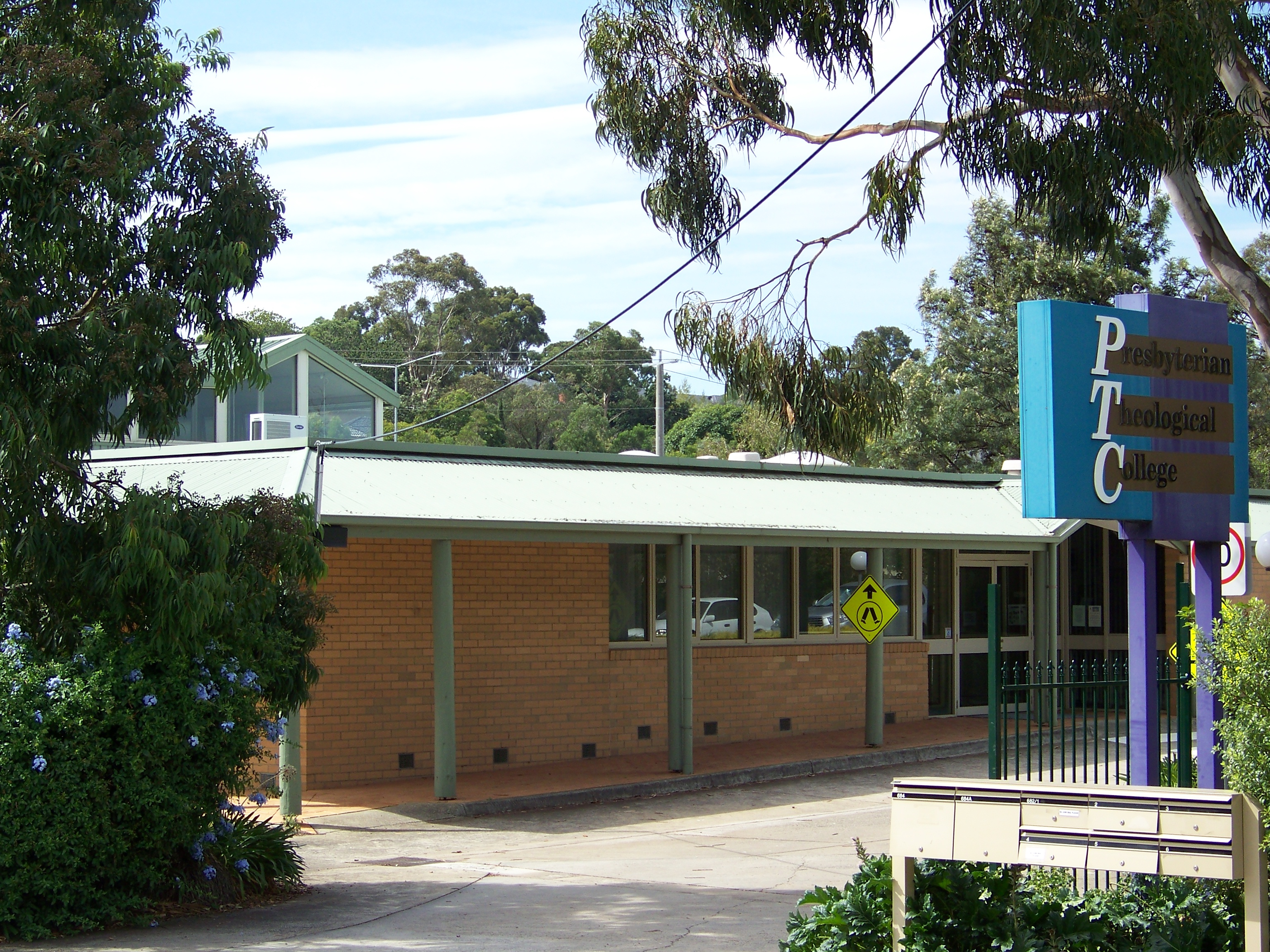
The Presbyterian Theological College in Box Hill, Victoria.
