= Free Presbyterian Church of Victoria =

- Classification: Protestant
- Orientation: Calvinist
- Polity: Presbyterian
- Associations: Joined with the Presbyterian Church of Eastern Australia in 1953
- Founder: James Forbes
- Origin: 1846; Melbourne, Victoria
- Separated from: Church of Scotland
- Separations: 1859 Majority joined Presbyterian Church of Victoria

The Free Presbyterian Church of Victoria, also known as the Free Church of Australia Felix, was an Australian Presbyterian denomination founded in Melbourne, Victoria in 1846 as a result of the Disruption of 1843 in the Church of Scotland.

== Founding ==
The first Presbyterian minister in Melbourne, James Forbes and one of his three elders at Scots' Church, Melbourne adhered to the position also adopted by those who withdrew from the 'Synod of Australian in connection with the Established Church of Scotland' and formed the Presbyterian Church of Eastern Australia in New South Wales on 10 October 1846. Forbes became the leader of the Free Church group in the city. He and his elder withdrew from the Presbytery of Melbourne of the Synod and organised a distinct body on similar lines to the Presbyterian Church of Eastern Australia, although spelling out the constitution afresh rather than simply adhering to the existing constitution. There was no difference of principle between the two bodies.

Forbes gave up his stipend (£200 from the government plus £150 from the congregation), the church, school and manse he had erected, and commenced afresh. He issued his Protest on 29 October 1846 and submitted it to the Presbytery of Melbourne on 17 November, the date of the organising meeting of what the minutes call The Free Presbyterian Church of Australia Felix. He used the premises of the Mechanics' Hall (where the Athenaeum now stands) for the new denomination. The first service was held on 22 November 1846, with about 200 people crowding the building.

== John Knox School ==
The building of John Knox Free Presbyterian Church, Swanston Street was opened 8 May 1848 on the corner with Little Lonsdale Street and with frontage to that street. The John Knox School began in the building on 3 July 1848 with Thomas James Everist as teacher. Within a year there were 120 students and an adjoining brick building came into use in August 1850. The congregation erected a two-storey manse next door to the church in Swanston Street late in 1850. The Rev William Miller was inducted as the next minister 1851-1865 (not to be confused with a contemporary Rev William B. Miller). The church was reconstructed in 1863 and re-opened by Rev William McIntyre 26 July of that year. Since 1879 it has housed the Church of Christ congregation.

Additional educational facilities were also provided. Chalmers Free Church School began on 4 June 1850 under George McMaster, an experienced Scottish teacher. The school used purpose-built leased premises at what is now 257 Spring Street. It was a small co-educational school but Forbes had a vision for a college for boys which would provide ‘teachers for our common schools’ and be ‘the first step towards the training of a Colonial ministry from among the Colonial youth.’ He personally sought and obtained the assistance of Miss Mure of Warriston in Edinburgh, to guarantee the salary of a rector and so make the project viable. Forbes, W.M.Bell and John McDonnell bore the initial financial responsibility.

When McMaster transferred to the Knox Free Presbyterian School in October he was replaced by George Knox until May 1851. At that point the students were transferred to Knox and the Chalmers' premises stood empty waiting for the arrival of the rector from Scotland. The Academy opened in the Chalmers premises 6 October 1851. Robert Lawson (1826–69) was the academy’s rector. The Academy moved to the south-west corner of Spring and Little Collins Streets in 1852, and the Chalmers’ premises were let to an unrelated minister, Rev. William B. Miller. The school moved to East Melbourne in 1854 where it soon adopted the name Scotch College. Forbes died shortly before the opening. Of recent years Scotch College, now located in Hawthorn, has rediscovered its founder. In 2002 the first stage of the impressive buildings of the James Forbes Academy (drama/music) was opened.

== Later Church expansion ==
Forbes sought to obtain additional ministers for the Free Church. He apparently offended the Irish Church by some critical remarks on some individual Irish ministers who had not stood with him in 1846, so assistance came chiefly from the Free Church of Scotland. Thomas Hastie came from Tasmania in January 1847 and was settled at Buninyong and The Leigh, while Rev J.Z. Huie became minister at Geelong in the same year. Schools were established in both parishes. There was little other help until the explosion of population following the discovery of gold in 1851, the year of Forbes' death.

The three ministers and Henrie Bell, elder at John Knox, formed the Synod of the Free Presbyterian Church on 9 June 1847. Forbes showed himself an efficient administrator. He not only wrote the Fundamental Act of the Synod (which was adopted also by the Free Presbyterian Church of South Australia upon its formation 9 May 1854) but he drew up rules for the guidance of the church. Forbes' strong stance against receiving state aid on an indiscriminate basis was modified in 1853.

Forbes' death plus the revolution caused by the Gold Rush meant his careful positions were modified to facilitate union into the Presbyterian Church of Victoria in 1859. At this time, his denomination merged with Church of Scotland and United Presbyterian congregations.

Those bent on union expelled anti-unionists in 1857 so there were two Free Presbyterian Synods until the majority joined in forming the Presbyterian Church of Victoria in 1859. The remaining Synod did not obtain recognition in Scotland and divided again in 1864, some joining the union in 1867 and the rest continuing the Free Presbyterian Church on the original footing. The remnant Free Presbyterian body co-operated post 1865 with similar remnants of the Free Presbyterian Church of South Australia and the Presbyterian Church of Eastern Australia. The South Australian Church became effectively defunct around 1921 although not until 2001 was an Act of Parliament secured to resolve property issues there.

Congregations of the Free Presbyterian Church of Victoria before 1859 included John Knox Melbourne, Chalmers' East Melbourne, South Yarra (Punt Road), Richmond (Bridge Road), St Kilda, Brighton, St Andrew's Carlton, Geelong (Little Malop Street), Geelong Gaelic, Myers Street/LaTrobe Terrace), Bellarine, Batesford, Ballarat (Sturt Street), Bendigo (St Andrew's), Hamilton, Burnbank, Beaufort, Gippsland (Sale). Centres existing after the union moves concluded in 1867 included Meredith and Ballarat region; Drysdale; Nareen; and stations at Camperdown (from 1880) and Charlton (from 1881) - but it was difficult to maintain them as population moved to larger centres, and ministers were in very short supply by the early 1900s, so these works eventually disappeared.

Ironically, the three parishes that ultimately continued the Free Presbyterian Church of Victoria and united with the Presbyterian Church of Eastern Australia in 1953 (St Kilda East, Geelong (Myers Street) and Hamilton/Branxholme) had all benefited from state-aid. The property of these three centres has been sold off in recent years and new centres established. They are, Geelong: Coppards Road, Newcomb 1991-; Melbourne: Knox 1987-2023; Narre Warren 1990 - since 1990 and Carrum Downs since 2018).
