= Scots' Church, Melbourne =

Presbyterian church in Australia

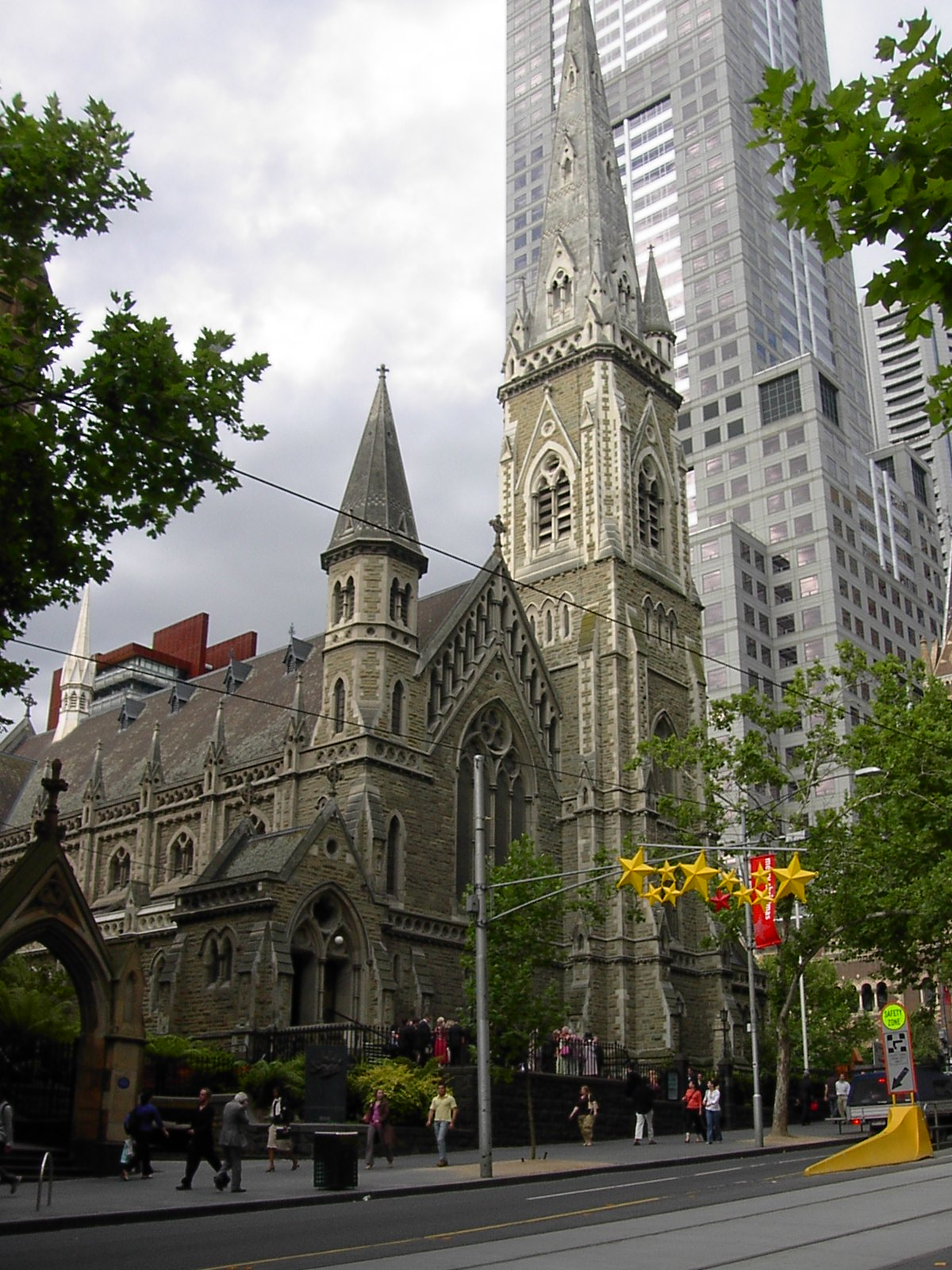
- The Scots' Church, Melbourne
- Scots' Church, Melbourne
- 37°48′52″S 144°58′06″E
- Location: 156 Collins St, Melbourne, Victoria
- Country: Australia
- Denomination: Presbyterian
- Website: scotschurch.com

History
- Status: Church
- Founded: 1838
- Founder: James Forbes
- Dedicated: 29 November 1874

Architecture
- Functional status: Active
- Architect: Joseph Reed
- Architectural type: Church
- Style: Gothic Revival
- Years built: 1871–1874

Specifications
- Capacity: 600
- Materials: Freestone

Administration
- Division: Victoria

The Scots' Church is a Presbyterian church in Collins Street, Melbourne, Victoria, Australia. It is a Reformed Protestant church and was the first Presbyterian church to be built in the Port Phillip District (now the state of Victoria). It is a congregation of the Presbyterian Church of Australia. Its building was described as "an icon for well over a hundred years".

== Background ==
The Reverend James Forbes was recruited to come to Australia as a Presbyterian minister by the Rev. John Dunmore Lang, arriving in Melbourne from Sydney via boat on 20 January 1838. He found that a retired Church of Scotland minister, the Rev. James Clow, had arrived on 25 December 1837 and had commenced an afternoon service from 2:00 pm and 4:00 pm according to Presbyterian forms in a basic building constructed west of William Street and north of Little Collins Street (now the site of the AMP centre). Clow had been a Church of Scotland chaplain in Bombay, India, but had retired and was of independent means. He had intended to settle in South Australia but when he stopped en route in Hobart the positive reports about Port Phillip led him to visit the Port Phillip District in October 1837 and then settle permanently.

== Original church ==
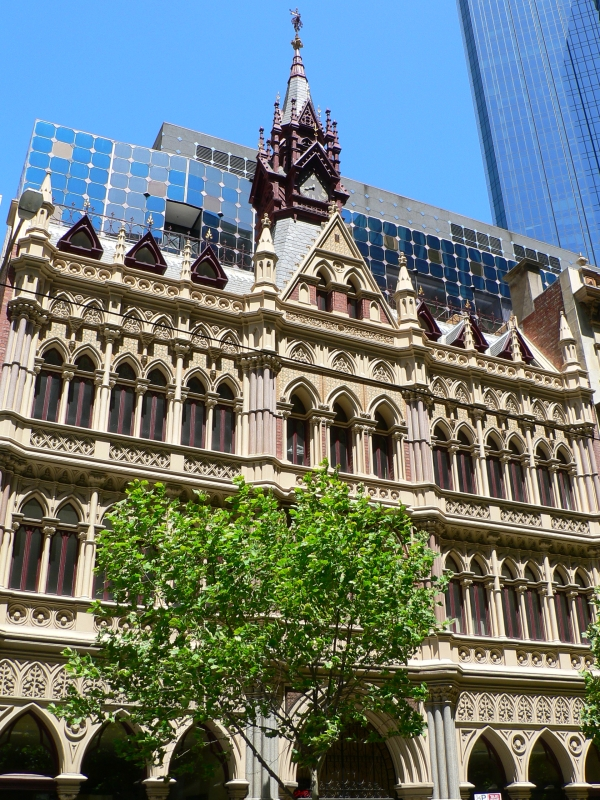
The Olderfleet Buildings, near the site of the first Scots' Church

Forbes continued the Presbyterian services commenced by Clow on 31 December 1837 in the "Pioneers Church" near the northwest corner of William and Little Collins streets. The Church of England soon made exclusive claims to this communal building and so Forbes held services in Craig and Broadfoot's store in Collins Street until a temporary timber building called "The Scots' Church" was opened on the adjoining land loaned by David Fisher in July 1838. The site was between where the Olderfleet and Rialto buildings were subsequently erected (Lot 14 Section 2). It was essentially a large room with a fireplace.

On 3 February 1838 a meeting of members and friends of the Church of Scotland was held with James Clow in the chair. It was resolved to build a church and that £300 be raised in order to obtain the matching grant available under the Church Act. This is regarded as the official birthday of Presbyterianism in Victoria and of the foundation of the Scots' Church. A committee of James Clow (treasurer), James Forbes and Skene Graig (secretaries) was appointed to collect subscriptions and to take the steps to obtain a church site. The sum of £139.19.0 was subscribed on the spot.

The Scots' Church secured a 2.0-acre (8,100 m^{2}) site on the corner of Collins and Russell streets as a government grant. When the site was allocated, the elders objected that it was "too far out of town".

The temporary building also served as the Scots' Church School which relocated to new brick premises in September 1839 on the western part of the 2-acre (8,100 m^{2}) site on the corner of Collins and Russell Streets adjoining the present Baptist Church and on which George's Department Store was later erected.

== First "Scots'" church ==
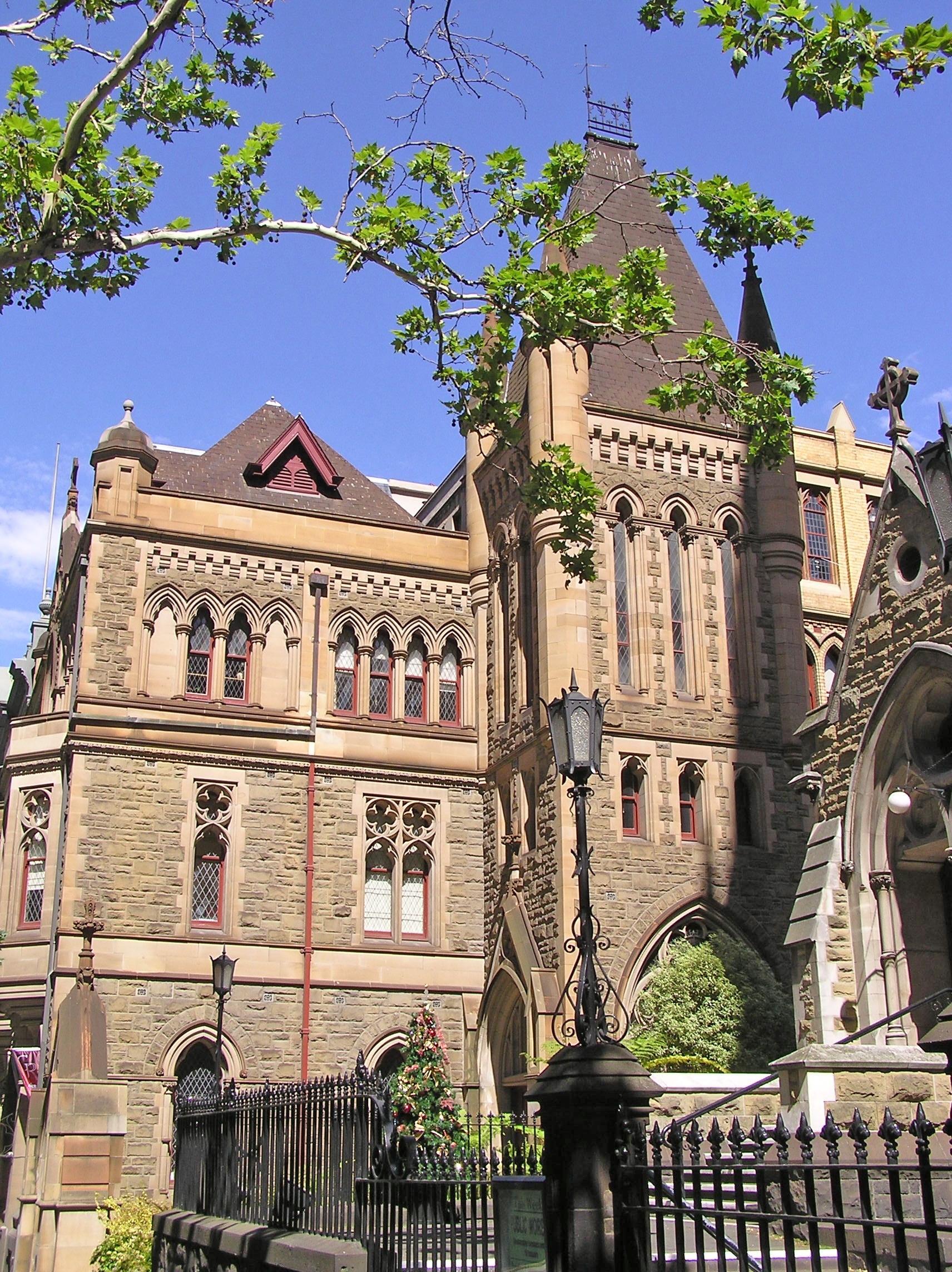
The Assembly Building, adjoining the site of the first Scots' Church in Collins Street

The foundation stone of the first purpose built church building was laid on 22 January 1841 and the church was opened on 3 October 1841. It was designed to seat 500 and the contract sum was £2,485 without plastering, gallery, vestry or fittings. The building was opened with temporary seating. Plastering was carried out the following year, proper pews, gallery and vestry were added in 1849 and a spire some years later.

James Forbes built a simple manse (minister's house) on the site where the Assembly Hall now stands and was later reimbursed. It was replaced by a two-storey manse in 1852 during the ministry of the Reverend Irving Hetherington. The manse was sold to the General Assembly of the Presbyterian Church of Victoria for 5,000 pounds in 1897, and in 1914–15 the Assembly Hall was erected. In 2008 the Assembly Hall was bought by the Scots' Church Properties Trust to be renovated for use as congregational offices and meeting halls following the proposed demolition of The Scots' Church Hall in Russell Street and the heritage listed Scots' Church Car Park and the redevelopment of the site with a 10-story building.

The first church building was demolished partly because of concerns that the tower and spire would collapse after it developed huge cracks and became crooked. During the ministry of the Revd Peter Menzies (1868–74) the building was too small for the congregation but, in any case, a building more suited to the site and the social position of the congregation was considered appropriate.

== Current building ==
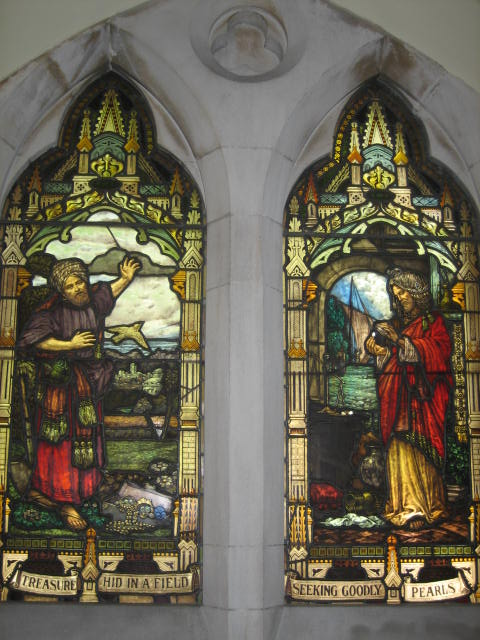
One of the stained glass windows at Scots, depicting the Parable of the Hidden Treasure and the Parable of the Pearl

Planned to be "the most beautiful building in Australia", construction of the current building took place between 1871 and 1874, during the ministry of the Revd Irving Hetherington and his colleague the Revd Peter Menzies, and was opened on 29 November 1874 with fixed seating for just under 1,000 people. It was designed by Joseph Reed of the firm Reed and Barnes, and built by David Mitchell, the father of Dame Nellie Melba. Reed and Barnes also designed the Melbourne Town Hall, the State Library of Victoria, Trades Hall, the Royal Exhibition Building, the Wesley Church in Lonsdale Street, the original Presbyterian Ladies' College in East Melbourne, and the Collins Street Independent Church, now St Michael’s Uniting Church, on the opposite corner of Russell Street.

The Scots' Church is in the Neo-Gothic style and built of Barrabool freestone, with dressings in Kakanui stone from New Zealand. During the last decades of the nineteenth century the spire of the Scots' Church was the tallest structure in Melbourne at 61 metres (201 ft) high. The interior features an impressive collection of large and smaller stained glass windows depicting various Christian themes including the Last Supper, basalt aisle columns, timber beamed roof and an elevated floor for a good view of the pulpit.

Laid up in the church are two sets of Regimental Colours of the Australian 5th Battalion, The Victorian Scottish Regiment, which include the honour LANDING at ANZAC.

The crest and flag of the Australian prime minister Sir Robert Menzies are located near the lectern. Queen Elizabeth II was present for the presentation by Dame Pattie Menzies in 1983. Queen Elizabeth had been accompanied by Menzies in 1961 when they visited the Scots' Church to unveil a war memorial mosaic in the vestible near the entrance.

=== Music ===
The director of music and principal organist since 1984 is Douglas Lawrence, while Jennifer Chou is the assistant organist. Robin Batterham is the organist emeritus.

=== Organ ===
The first pipe organ at the church was built in 1883 by Hill and Son. It was rebuilt and enlarged in 1910 by George Fincham and Sons and rebuilt again in 1959. The organ was removed for storage in 1999. The present organ was built in 1998 by Rieger Orgelbau, Schwarzach, Austria.

=== Choir ===
The choir of Scots' Church has been under Lawrence's direction since 1984. He had started the Choir of Ormond College (University of Melbourne) in 1982 and raised the standard at Scots’ considerably. The choir released their first recording in 1987, Joy my Heart Outpoured. Scots' choir consists of four principals, eight choral scholars and other members. Dame Nellie Melba reputedly started and finished her singing career in the choir at Scots' Church, and her funeral was held at the church in February 1931.

== Ministers ==
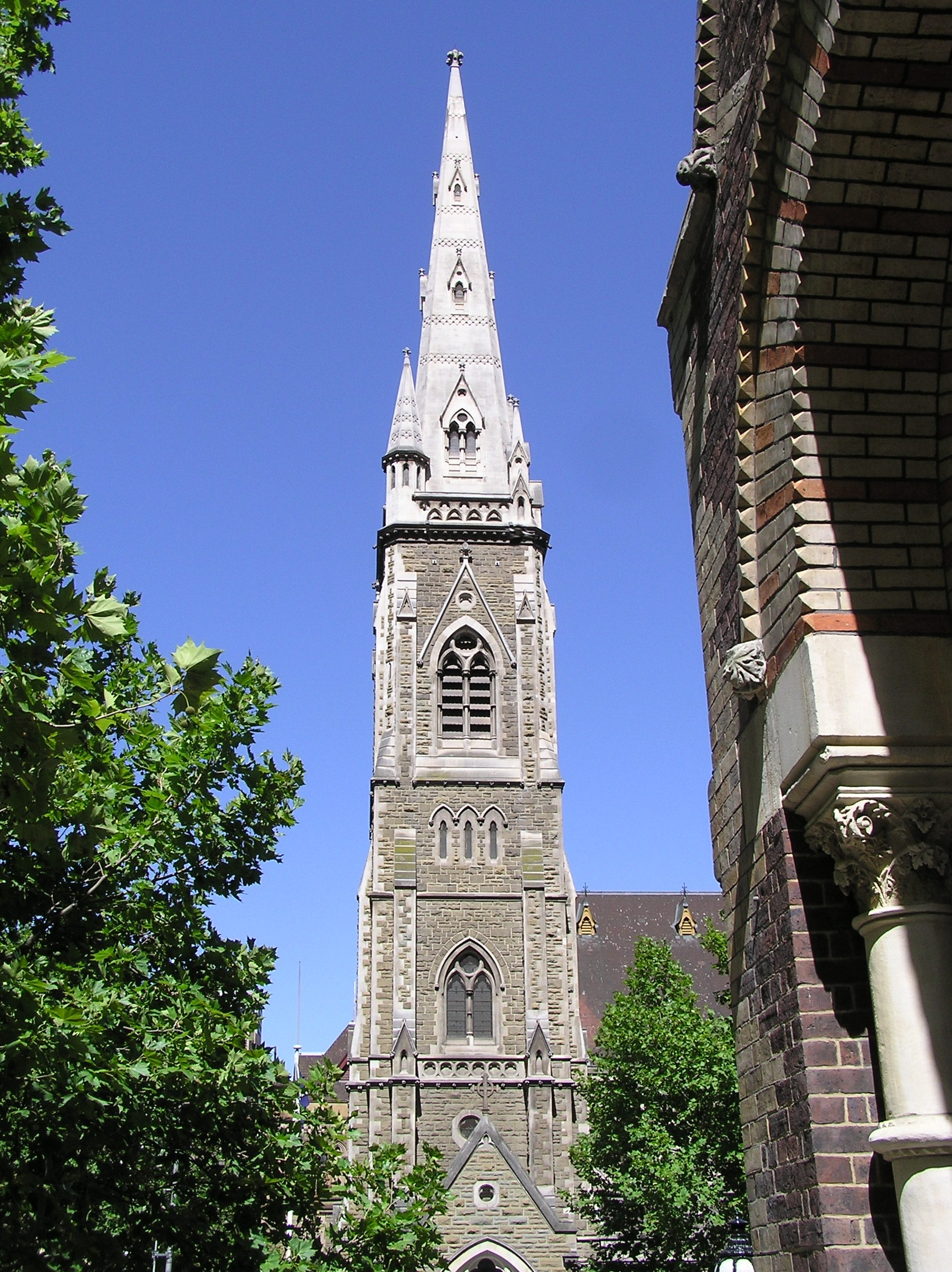
Scots' Church tower in the Gothic Revival style

The first minister of Scots' Church was the Revd James Forbes who, as well as being involved in the foundation of Scots' Church, was instrumental in the establishment of John Knox Free Presbyterian Church on Swanston Street (now housing a Church of Christ congregation), Scotch College, the Royal Melbourne Hospital and the Melbourne Mechanics' Institute.

The Revd Charles Strong became the minister in 1875. His theology was questioned after the publication of an article in the Victorian Review entitled "The Atonement", but he resigned from Scots' Church before the Presbyterian Church of Victoria heard the case.

Scots' Church is currently served by its senior minister, the Rev. Phil Campbell, and assistant minister, the Rev. Dr. Arthur Keefer. The Rev Litha Heshusius coordinates pastoral care. Historically, most of the senior ministers at Scots' Church have been trained or served in the Church of Scotland, including previous minister Douglas Robertson. The Australian-born Campbell breaks with this trend; as do the other members of the ministry team, reflecting the changing demographics of the city and of Scots' Church.

As in any church with a presbyterian structure, the ministers of Scots' govern and care for the congregation with a body of church elders called the Session.

Every few years, a visiting preacher may be invited to spend some time at Scots' under the terms of the Turnbull Trust. Past preachers have included Hugh Black, Lauchlan MacLean Watt, and James S. Stewart. The most recent Turnbull Trust preacher was David Lunan.

== Services ==
Services are held on every Sunday of the year. A traditional service is held at 11:00 am and a contemporary service known as "ScotsCity" (formerly known as "Engage City Church") at 5:00 pm at 156 Collins Street. Communion is held on the first Sunday of each season (autumn, winter, spring and summer) and on Easter Sunday. On the Wednesday before the AFL Grand Final, Scots' hosts a grand final service. Shaun Hart spoke at this service in 2009.

During the COVID-19 pandemic and lockdown in 2021, Scots' effectively moved to online services using both Zoom and YouTube platforms. The choir prepared and recorded musical items during the week, which were shared in the live Sunday services. These services and musical highlights can be viewed on YouTube.

On 1 April 2007, the congregation known as the Indonesian Christian Church officially joined Scots'. They now hold services every Sunday morning at 10:30 in the building next door to Scots' Church. This congregation has grown under the leadership of its founder, Prof Sen Sendjaya, who also serves as an elder of The Scots' Church Session .

== Theology ==
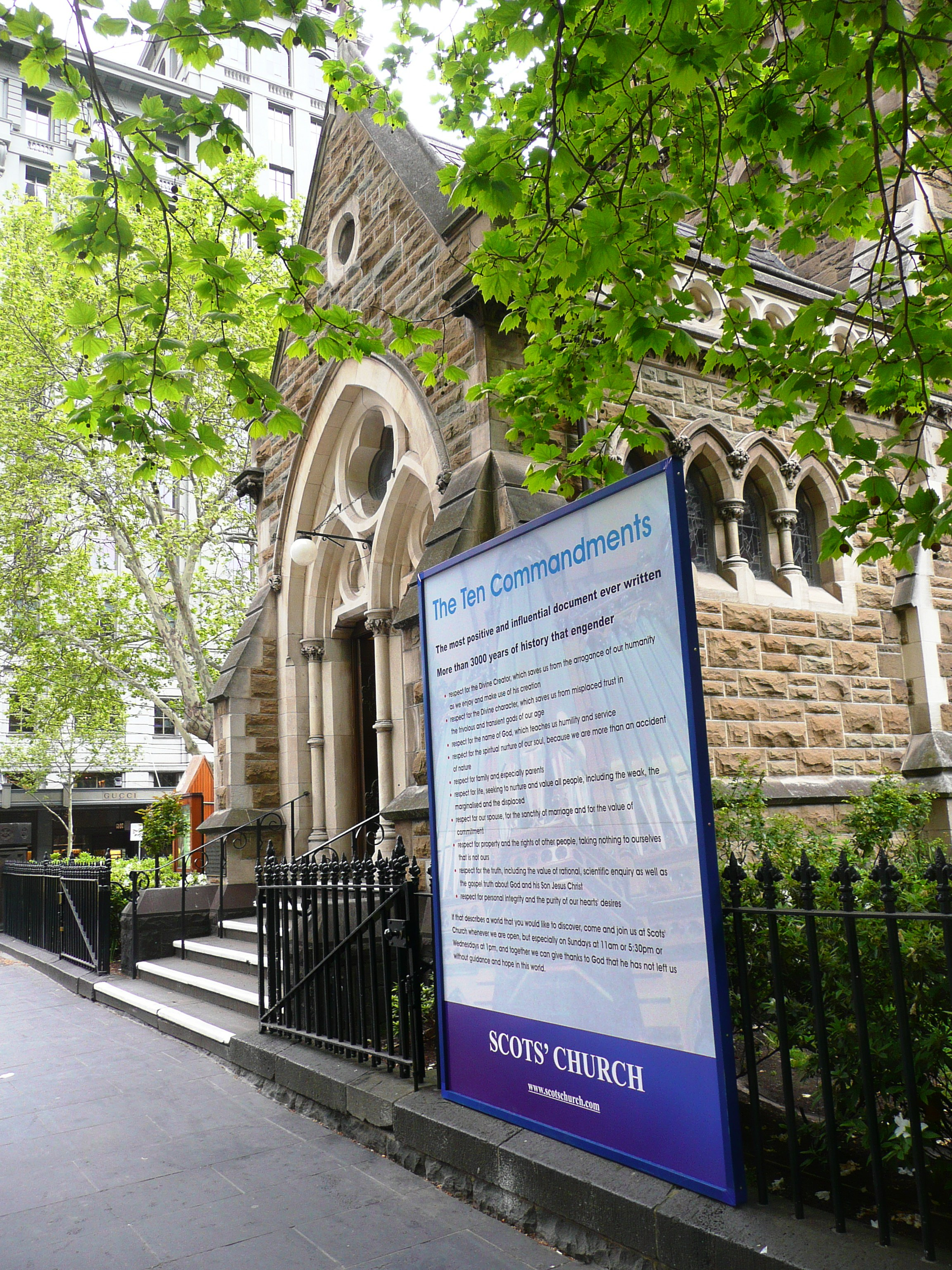
A poster published and displayed by Scots' Church in response to a poster from St Michael's Uniting Church describing the Ten Commandments as "one of the most negative documents ever written".

As a congregation of the Presbyterian Church of Australia, the ministers and elders of Scots' Church are required to ascribe to the Westminster Confession of Faith, the major English statement of Calvinistic Christianity, read in the light of a Declaratory Statement explanatory of certain clauses and which also allows liberty of opinion on matters not essential to the doctrine taught in the Confession.

Members are not required to ascribe to the Westminster Confession, but, if they are not already a member of a Christian church, are admitted to membership by making a public declaration of faith in Jesus Christ and their commitment to the church.

=== Ecumenism ===
Scots' Church has participated in a number of ecumenical activities. Two Catholics have preached from the pulpit of Scots' Church, the Archbishop of Melbourne, Sir Frank Little, in 1974 and Bishop Mark Coleridge in May 2005.

In 2021, Scots' worked closely with the Salvation Army Project 614 on a campaign called "Loving the City to Life", offering encouragement to the CBD community after 'the longest lockdown in the world' due to the COVID-19 pandemic. Members of Scots' and Project 614 arranged a 'Festival of Buskers' and served free coffee to passers by.

=== Francis Macnab and the Ten Commandments ===
In September 2008, Francis Macnab of St Michael's Uniting Church launched what he called a "new faith" with a $120,000 advertising campaign including posters reading "The Ten Commandments, one of the most negative documents ever written."

The session of Scots' Church installed a poster on the Russell Street frontage facing towards St Michael's describing the Ten Commandments as "the most positive and influential document ever written".

== See also ==
- Australian non-residential architectural styles
