= James Forbes (minister) =

Scottish Presbyterian minister & educator (1813-1851)

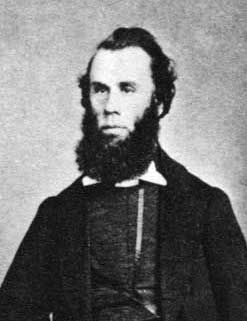
- Born: 4 April 1813; Leochel-Cushnie, Scotland
- Died: 12 August 1851 (aged 38); Melbourne, Australia
- Education: Aberdeen Grammar School; King's College, Aberdeen
- Occupations: Minister and educator
- Spouse: Helen Clow (m. 1845)
- Children: Margaret Chirnside; James Forbes; Helen Creswick; Charles Forbes
- Parent(s): Peter and Margaret Forbes

James Forbes (4 April 1813 – 12 August 1851) was a Scottish-Australian Presbyterian minister and educator. He founded the Melbourne Academy, later Scotch College.

== Life in Scotland ==
James Forbes was the oldest of the ten children (only five surviving infancy) born to Peter and Margaret Forbes who farmed "New Braes" on the estate of Sir Arthur Forbes in the parish of Leochel-Cushnie about 40 kilometres (40,000 m) west of Aberdeen, Scotland. He was baptised on 4 April 1813, and was educated locally and at Aberdeen Grammar School

He entered King's College, Aberdeen in 1826 and completed the Arts course in 1829 but, like the majority of students who regarded it as an expensive formality, he did not bother to graduate. The Church of Scotland's Presbytery of Garioch records show that he was enrolled in divinity for part of 1829/30, 1830/31 and as a regular student 1831/32. He must have had doubts about his fitness for the ministry for he accepted a teaching appointment at the Colchester Royal Grammar School in England between 1832 and 1835. Here he experienced an evangelical conversion as he heard the sermons given in the school assembly by the Church of England preachers. This brought him back to the divinity course at Aberdeen which he completed in 1837.

He was licensed as a preacher by the Presbytery of Garioch on 10 May 1837. Recruited for Australia through the influence of Rev John Dunmore Lang he was ordained with his friend William McIntyre by the Presbytery of Glasgow on 29 June 1837 for work in Australia.

== Departure for Australia ==
Leaving Greenock on the 541 ton barque Portland on 24 July 1837, Forbes arrived in Sydney on 4 December 1837. The passengers included Dr Lang and a number of other ministers and teachers. Forbes rejected Lang's proposal that the new ministers join him in forming the Synod of New South Wales to rival the existing Presbytery of New South Wales, and duly became a member of the Presbytery. His appointment being for the District of Port Phillip, he arrived there by boat on 20 January 1838.

He found his future father-in-law, Rev James Clow, had arrived in Melbourne to settle the previous Christmas Day. Clow was a Church of Scotland chaplain from Bombay retired due to health issues and of independent means. Forbes offered to go to Geelong, but Clow deferred to the younger man with an official appointment. Forbes thus became the first Christian minister settled as such in Melbourne, which was then a settlement of a few huts and two weatherboard houses that served as hotels. Within 18 months the population increased from a few hundred to 3000.

== Presbyterian beginnings in Melbourne ==
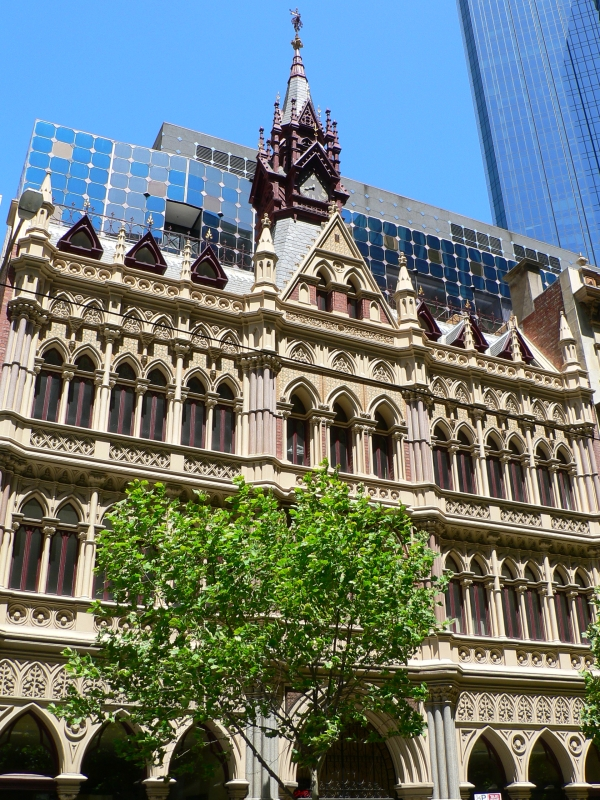
The Olderfleet Buildings, near the site of the first Scots' Church

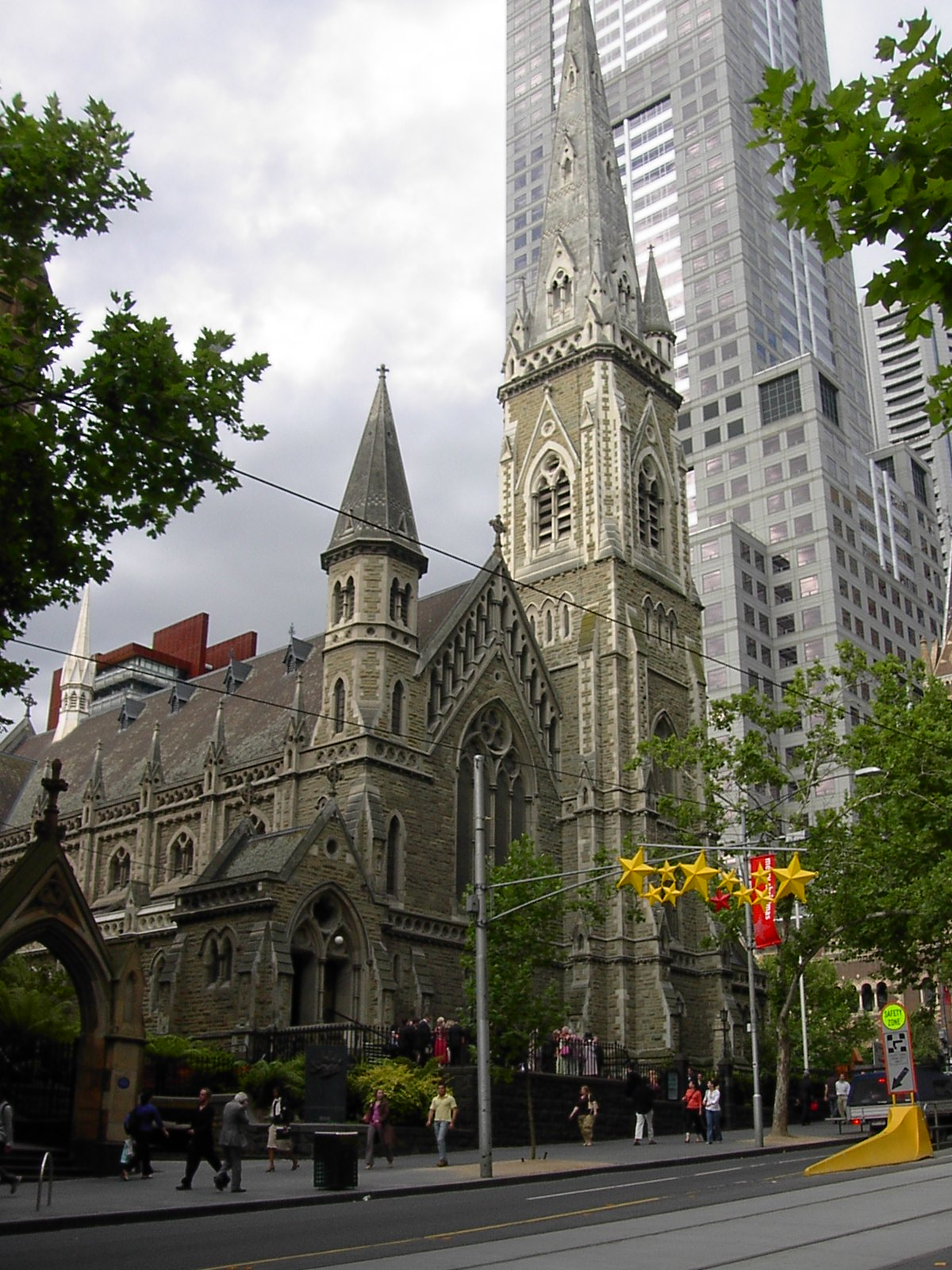
Scots' Church, Melbourne

On Saturday 3 February 1838 a meeting of members and friends of the Church of Scotland was held with James Clow in the chair. It was resolved to build a church and that £300 be raised in order to obtain the matching grant available under the Church Act. This is regarded as the official birthday of Presbyterianism in Victoria and of the beginning of Scots’ Church. A committee of James Clow (treasurer), James Forbes and Skene Graig (secretaries) was appointed to collect subscriptions and to take the steps to obtain a church site. The sum of £139.19.0 was subscribed on the spot.

Forbes continued the afternoon service each Sunday in the Pioneers Church on William Street on the corner of Collins Street begun by Clow on 31 December 1837. This communal building had been opened in February 1837 but soon after the land on which it was built was reserved for the Church of England. In April 1838 the Bishop indicated it would not be available for use by others once a resident priest arrived. The Presbyterians resolved to provide their own facilities so Forbes held services in Craig and Broadfoot's store in Collins Street until a temporary timber building called Scots Church was opened in July 1838 on the adjoining site owned by David Fisher. The location was between where the Winfield building now stands (adjoining the old Rialto) (Lot 14 Section 2). It was essentially a large room with a fireplace able to hold about 60 people.

The temporary building also served as the Scots' Church School, which was begun on 26 November 1838 with Robert Campbell as teacher. He had come to Australia with Forbes and was a Scots' elder from 1839 until 1842. The school prospered and soon had 80 pupils. The school relocated to new brick premises in September 1839 on the part of the 2-acre (8,100 m^{2}) site on the corner of Collins and Russell Streets which adjoins the present Baptist Church and on which Georges department store was later erected. The number of students was soon 150, a third of them girls, and two aboriginal children were among those who received prizes at the first examination in June 1840. The church services also moved to the school.

The first purpose built Scots Church on the present site, corner of Collins and Russell Streets, was opened on 3 October 1841. It was designed for 500 sittings and the contract sum was £2,485 without plastering, gallery, vestry or fittings. The building was opened with temporary seating on 3 October 1841, plastering was carried out the following year, proper pews, gallery and vestry were added in 1849 and a spire some years later. (The present building was opened 29 November 1874 seated for 900.)

== Expansion ==
Forbes visited Geelong in November 1838 and obtained Rev Andrew Love from Scotland as minister for this place. He arrived in April 1840. In 1842 three more ministers were secured and the Synod in Sydney approved Forbes' request for a separate Presbytery of Melbourne to be formed. It held its first meeting on 7 June 1842.

== Early Societies ==
Forbes was the founding honorary secretary of the British and Foreign Bible Society auxiliary founded in 1840, chairman of the Port Phillip Theological Education Society, assisted in the founding of what is now the Royal Melbourne Hospital and the Melbourne Debating Society, all in 1841.

In 1845 he inaugurated the Presbyterian Female Visiting Society. As it was not sectarian in 1847 it was renamed the Melbourne Ladies Benevolent Society. He supported aboriginal missions established by Wesleyans and Baptists, and was a true friend of all.

== The Free Kirk ==
The effects of the Disruption of the Established Church of Scotland in May 1843 had repercussions in Australia. Forbes and one of his three elders adhered to the position also adopted by those who formed the Presbyterian Church of Eastern Australia on 10 October 1846.

Reasons of distance and the general desire of those in Port Phillip to run their affairs without control from Sydney, meant Forbes organised a distinct body but on similar lines to the Presbyterian Church of Eastern Australia, formed as a result of the Disruption.

Forbes became the leader of the Free Church group in the city. Forbes gave up his stipend (£200 from the government plus £150 from the congregation), the church, school and manse he had erected, and commenced afresh. He issued his Protest on 29 October 1846 and submitted it to the Presbytery of Melbourne on 17 November, the date of the organising meeting of what the minutes call The Free Presbyterian Church of Australia Felix. He used the premises of the Mechanics' Hall (where the Athenaeum now stands) for the new denomination. The first service was held on 22 November 1846, with about 200 people crowding the building.

The building of John Knox Free Presbyterian Church, Swanston Street was opened 8 May 1848 on the corner with Little Lonsdale Street and with frontage to that street. The John Knox School began in the building on 3 July 1848 with Thomas James Everist as teacher. Within a year there were 120 students and an adjoining brick building came into use in August 1850. The congregation erected a two-storey manse next door to the church in Swanston Street late in 1850. The church was reconstructed in 1863 and re-opened by Rev William McIntyre 26 July of that year. It now houses the Church of Christ congregation.

Forbes sought to obtain additional ministers for the Free Church. He apparently offended the Irish Church by some critical remarks on some individual Irish ministers who had not stood with him in 1846, so assistance came chiefly from the Free Church of Scotland. Thomas Hastie came from Tasmania in January 1847 and was settled at Buninyong and The Leigh, while Rev J.Z. Huie became minister at Geelong in the same year. Schools were established in both parishes. There was little other help until the explosion of population following the discovery of gold in 1851, the year of Forbes' death.

The three ministers and Henrie Bell, elder at John Knox, formed the Synod of the Free Presbyterian Church on 9 June 1847. Forbes showed himself an efficient administrator. He not only wrote the Fundamental Act of the Synod (which was adopted also by the Free Presbyterian Church of South Australia upon its formation 9 May 1854) but he drew up rules for the guidance of the church.

His own death plus the revolution caused by the Gold Rush meant his careful positions were modified to facilitate union into the Presbyterian Church of Victoria in 1859. At this time, his denomination merged with Church of Scotland and United Presbyterian congregations.

His strong stance against receiving state aid on an indiscriminate basis was modified in 1853. Ironically, the three parishes that ultimately continued the Free Presbyterian Church of Victoria and united with the Presbyterian Church of Eastern Australia in 1953 (St Kilda East, Geelong (Myers Street) and Hamilton/Branxholme) had all benefited from state-aid.

== Forbes and education ==
Forbes has been called Victoria's First Public Educationist (Edward Sweetman, 1939). He wrote extensively on this subject in the Port Phillip Gazette and in his own Port Phillip Christian Herald.

The Chalmers Free Church School began in purpose-built premises at what is now 257 Spring Street as a small co-educational school under George McMaster, an experienced Scottish teacher. The school was named after Thomas Chalmers, the first Moderator of the Free Church of Scotland Assembly. the students were transferred to the Knox school in May 1851 and the premises kept ready for the arrival of a rector for a boys college. Forbes was keen to see a superior educational institution which would provide an education in the higher branches of science and literature as 'the first step towards the training of a Colonial ministry from among the Colonial youth.' He personally sought and obtained the assistance of Miss Mure of Warriston, Edinburgh, to guarantee the salary of a rector and so make the project viable. The Academy, as it was called, opened in the Chalmers premises 6 October 1851 with Robert Lawson as rector. The Academy moved to the south-west corner of Spring and Little Collins Streets in 1852, and to East Melbourne in 1854 where it soon adopted the name Scotch College. Forbes died shortly before the opening. Scotch College, now located in Hawthorn, opened the first stage of the impressive buildings of the James Forbes Academy in 2002.

== Forbes and politics ==
He was an early temperance advocate and, given the variety of religious bodies in the colony, was strongly opposed to churches receiving financial aid from the state.

== Family life ==
In 1845, Forbes married Helen Clow (1822–1898), the daughter of James Clow and they had four children:

- Margaret (1846) who married Robert Chirnside.
- James (1847–1898) who died unmarried and was buried with his parents.
- Helen (1849) who married Alexander Creswick.
- Charles (1851–1901), also a bachelor, baptised by his father as his last ministerial act.

== Death and legacy ==
Forbes' passing was much lamented. In 1855 his remains were removed to the new Melbourne Cemetery and a memorial erected. His name is held in honour still by both the Presbyterian Church of Victoria formed in 1859 as a union of most of the different strands of Presbyterianism, and by those few who continued the Free Presbyterian Church of Victoria and who in 1953 united with the Presbyterian Church of Eastern Australia.

== See also ==
- Adam Cairns
- Free Presbyterian Church of Victoria
- John Dunmore Lang
- William Miller
- Presbytery of New South Wales
- Scotch College, Melbourne
- Scots' Church, Melbourne
- Synod of Australia

== Bibliography ==
- Baker, D.W.A. (1998). Preacher, Politician, Patriot: A Life Of John Dunmore Lang. Carlton, Victoria: Melbourne University Press. ISBN 9780522848229.
- Balfour, R. Gordon (1899). "Lecture 4 - II Presbyterianism in Victoria". Presbyterianism in the colonies, with special reference to the principles and influence of the Free church of Scotland . Edinburgh: Macniven & Wallace. pp. 121-129, et passim.
- Finn, Edmund (1891). The Chronicles of Early Melbourne, 1835 to 1852 Historical, Anecdotal and Personal. Vol. 1. Melbourne: E. A. Petherick. pp. 159-166.
- French, E. L. (1969). "Forbes, James (1813–1851)". Australian Dictionary of Biography. Vol. 3. National Centre of Biography, Australian National University. p. 76. ISBN 978-0-522-84459-7. ISSN 1833-7538. OCLC 70677943.
- M. Harman, James Forbes of Melbourne (Sydney: Crossing Press, 2001)
- Prentis, Malcolm. "Great Australian Presbyterians: The Game". Uniting Church in Australia. Archived from the original on 11 December 2006.
- Scott, Hew (1928). Fasti ecclesiae scoticanae; the succession of ministers in the Church of Scotland from the reformation. Vol. 7. Edinburgh: Oliver and Boyd. p. 587-588.
- R.S.Ward (ed), Presbyterian Leaders in 19th Century Australia (Melbourne, 1993) 37–53
