= Leochel-Cushnie =

Leochel-Cushnie is a parish in Aberdeenshire, about 40 km west of Aberdeen (West Aberdeenshire (UK Parliament constituency)).

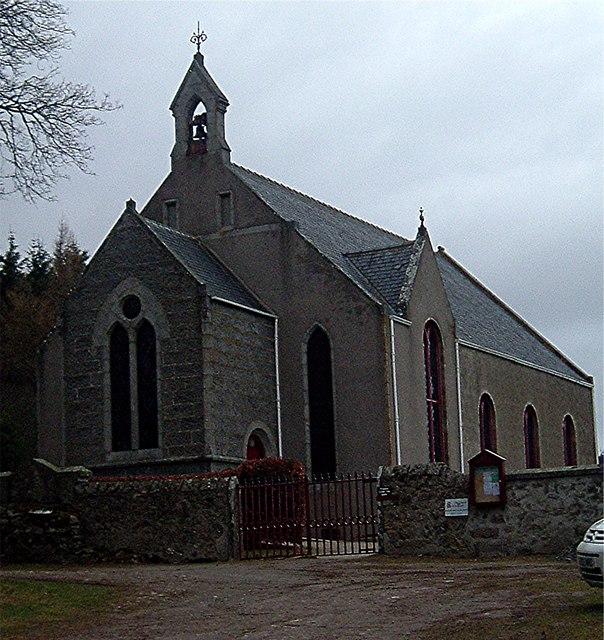

== Etymology ==
Cushnie over the centuries has been spelt Cussenin, Cusschene, Cusseny, Cuischnie, Cusney, and Cushney. It is pronounced locally with the 'U' as in 'cUsp'. There are several theories as to the origin of this name. One being that it derives from the Gaelic 'Cuisneach' meaning the frosty place – given that much of the Parish sits at around 1,000 ft above sea level and experiences harsh winters. Another possible theory according to Alexander Smith in 'A New History of Aberdeenshire' is that it comes from the Celtic Ch'oisinn, or Ch'oisne, which means the "corner or angle" of the country, as Dal or Daile-choisne, in Perthshire, means "the field at the corner or angle."

In ancient documents, Leochel is spelt Loychel, Loquhell, Lochel, Lochale, Leuchell, and Leochel. It is pronounced phonetically 'LUKEL.' According to Alexander Smith "the name is derived from the Celtic Lia, which signifies grey, and with the compound word uichill, a very common construction of Uch-dach-M'hill, meaning "prominent hills," we have Lia-uich-ill, the "grey prominent hills," which are very descriptive of the parish, and the derivation has every degree of probability.

Many of the place names in Leochel-Cushnie are of Scottish Gaelic origin including Balnakeilly (Baile-na-coille), "the town of the wood"; Balchimmy "the town of combing wool"; The Socach; "the snout or beak" Coiliochbhar "the wooded point or hill" and Alt Thronach "Stream or burn" (meaning of Thronach unknown). Pressendye – the highest hill that overlooks Cushnie at 619 metres – does not appear to be of Gaelic origin and its true meaning is unknown. It may derive from Pictish, which is an extinct Brittonic language that is related to Welsh and was spoken in the Northeast of Scotland until around the 11th century, being gradually replaced by Scottish Gaelic with the expansion of Dàl Riada and the unification of the Scottish kingdom. Scots Gaelic in turn was replaced by lowland Scots English or 'Doric', in this area of Aberdeenshire around the 16th and 17th centuries. By the time of the Statistical Accounts of Cushnie in 1792, it is stated "English is the only language known in the parish, the Gaelic having ceased to be understood".

== Stone circle ==
In January 2019 a supposedly ancient local "recumbent stone circle" was revealed to have been constructed by a former farm owner in the 1990s. Historic Environment Scotland and Aberdeenshire Council's archaeology service believed it to be real and ceased research after the former owner informed them.

== Notable people ==
- Peter Shepherd (1841–1879), a British Army doctor. He was born at Leochel Cushnie.
- Patrick Forbes, Bishop of Caithness, died at Craigievar, Aberdeenshire, in October 1668, and was buried in Leochel church, in the Craigievar aisle.
- John Forbes (1593–1648), a Scottish minister and theologian, was buried in the churchyard of Leochel.
- James Forbes (minister), a Scottish-Australian Presbyterian minister and educator, born 1813 in Leochel-Cushnie.

== See also ==
- List of listed buildings in Leochel-Cushnie, Aberdeenshire
