= Thomas James Everist =

Australian civil engineer, surveyor and architect

Thomas James Everist c1860.

Thomas James Everist (February 1807 – September 1879) was an Australian civil engineer, surveyor and architect who served as the first building surveyor of the City of Melbourne.

== Early life and emigration ==
Everist was born in Gravesend, Kent, in 1807. He trained as a civil engineer and architect and lived in Aberdeen before emigrating to Australia as an assisted migrant. He travelled with his wife, Ann Mitchell, and their infant daughter, Elizabeth, aboard the Isabella Watson arriving at Port Phillip on 11 August 1840.

Unable to find employment in his profession, Everist worked as a seedsman and flour merchant opening a store in Flinders Street and Collins Street by 1842. He and his father, Henry (who ran a stall at Market Place) sold fruit trees and vines imported from England and grown by John Pascoe Fawkner. In 1845, Everist was appointed collector for the Port Phillip Gazette.

== Building surveyor ==
In October 1849, Everist applied to succeed Charles Laing as Melbourne's city surveyor. Laing had secured the position ahead of Everist in 1842. Whilst Everist was seen to be a potential favourite for the position, the council instead elected James Blackburn on 23 October. Five weeks later, on 28 November, Everist was one of four candidates for the newly created office of building surveyor. He received all 12 votes cast. The position paid £150 a year and included assisting Blackburn.

Everist took office on 1 January 1850, when Melbourne's new building legislation came into force. The legislation regulated construction and the walls shared by adjoining properties to reduce the risk of fire spreading between buildings. Builders had to notify the council of proposed work and pay a fee before construction began. Everist was commissioned by the council to design and superintend construction of the Melbourne City Baths on Swanston Street. The baths opened in 1860. The present building, which replaced them in 1904, was designed by J. J. Clark.

Everist was building surveyor for 22 years through the Victorian gold rush and retired in 1872, being awarded a gratuity of £750 by the City Council. John Reilly, who had served as city surveyor, succeeded him on his resignation.

== Church activity and causes ==
Everist was an active leader in Melbourne's Presbyterian community. He opposed state aid to religion and joined the Free Presbyterian Church of Victoria congregation formed in Melbourne by the Reverend James Forbes after the Presbyterian split of 1846. When Forbes laid the foundation stone of John Knox Free Church (designed by city surveyor Charles Laing) at the corner of Swanston and Little Lonsdale streets on 17 November 1847, the document placed inside the stone named Everist as one of the congregation's three elders. The church opened in May 1848.

On 3 July 1848, the John Knox School opened in the church with Everist as its first teacher. Within a year it had 120 pupils. The school formed part of the educational work that led Forbes to establish the Melbourne Academy, later Scotch College. In May 1851, pupils from Forbes's Chalmers Free Church School transferred to John Knox, freeing the Chalmers schoolhouse in Spring Street for the new academy. It opened there on 6 October 1851.

In addition to his surveying work, Everist was a member of the Australasian Anti-Transportation League founded in Melbourne in 1851 by delegates from Victoria and Van Diemen's Land (now Tasmania). The league campaigned to end Britain's practice of sending convicted prisoners to the Australian colonies. He also served as a director of the Victoria Freehold Land Society. The society bought large parcels of land and divided them into smaller blocks that individuals could own outright, helping to establish Melbourne's first suburbs.

== Spring Hill vineyard ==
In 1855, Everist established a vineyard and orchard at Spring Hill in Hawthorn, on land bounded by Auburn Road, Barkers Road, Harcourt Street and Kildare Street. By 1861 he was selling Spring Hill wine in Melbourne. At the 1862 International Exhibition in London, he exhibited two white wines, Carignan and Gouais. He also exhibited wines at the 1865 Dublin Exhibition. His collection at the Melbourne Intercolonial Exhibition of 1866–67 included Mataro, Carignan and Hermitage and received an honourable mention.

== Family and death ==
Thomas James and Ann Everist had eight children, Elizabeth, Henry, George, Thomas, John, Isabella, Christina and James. Their great-grandson was the architect Neil Everist (1929–2016) who with David McGlashan founded the architectural practice McGlashan Everist.

Thomas James Everist died at Spring Hill in September 1879, aged 72. He was buried in the Booroondara Cemetery.
