= James Oswald Dykes =

British clergyman

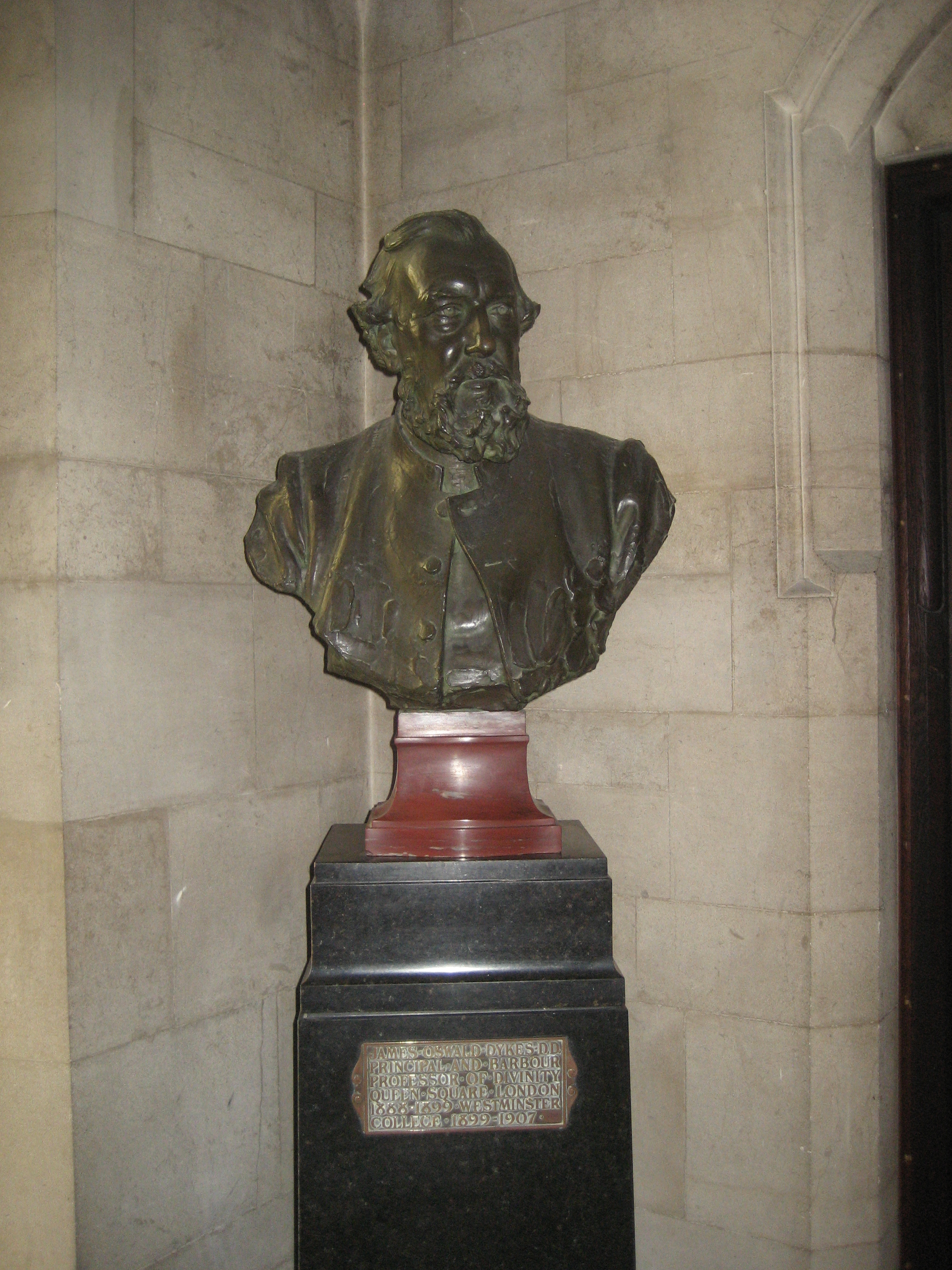
James Oswald Dykes (Bust in Westminster College, Cambridge)

James Oswald Dykes (14 August 1835, Port Glasgow – 1 January 1912, Edinburgh) was a Scottish Presbyterian clergyman and educator.

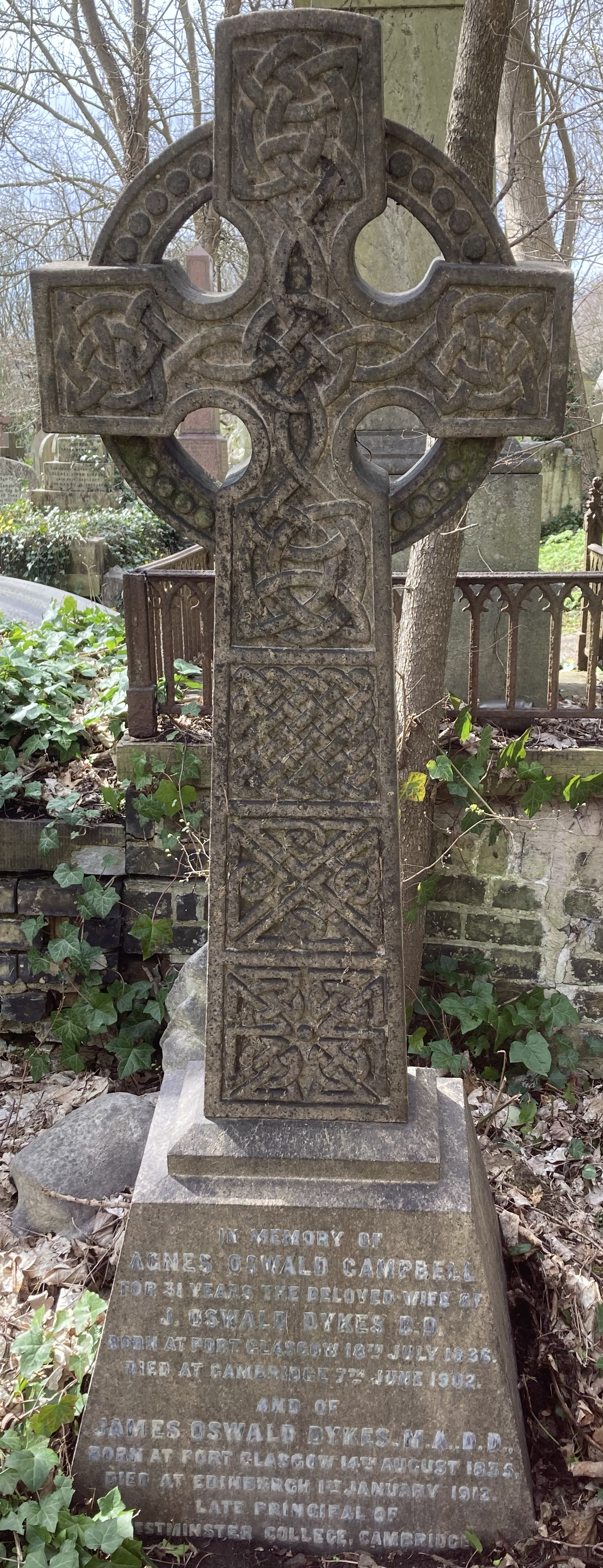
Grave of James Oswald Dykes in Highgate Cemetery

== Biography ==
James Oswald Dykes studied at Dumfries Academy and at the universities of Edinburgh, Heidelberg, and Erlangen. He was ordained to the Presbyterian ministry in 1859. From 1861 to 1864 he served with Robert Smith Candlish of Free St George's Church, Edinburgh.

Dykes visited the Australian colony of Victoria, where he influenced John Knox Church of Melbourne to join the Presbyterian Church of Victoria in 1867.

In 1869 Dykes was appointed minister of the Regent Square Presbyterian Church, London. Dykes was appointed principal and Barbour Professor of Divinity of the Theological College of the Presbyterian Church of England, now Westminster College, Cambridge, from 1888 to 1907. Cambridge University awarded him an honorary MA in 1900. In June 1901, he received an honorary doctorate of divinity from the University of Glasgow.

He died on 1 January 1912 and is buried on the eastern side of Highgate Cemetery.

== Works ==
His publications include:

- From Jerusalem to Antioch (1875)
- The Law of the Ten Words (1884)
- The Gospel according to St. Paul (1888)
- Plain Words on Great Themes (1892)
- The Christian Minister and his Duties (1908)
- The Divine Worker in Creation and Providence (1909)
