= Peter Shepherd (British Army officer) =

British Army doctor

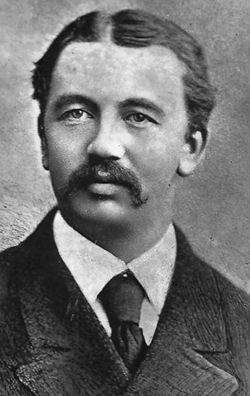
- Peter Shepherd, Surgeon Major
- Born: 25 August 1841; Leochel-Cushnie, Aberdeenshire
- Died: 22 January 1879 (aged 37); Battle of Isandhlwana, Natal, British Empire (now South Africa)
- Burial place: Isandhlwana, South Africa
- Alma mater: University of Aberdeen
- Military career
- Allegiance: United Kingdom
- Branch: British Army
- Service years: 1864–1879
- Rank: Surgeon Major
- Unit: Royal Army Medical Corps
- Conflicts: Battle of Isandlwana, Anglo-Zulu War
- Other work: First aid, ambulance manuals

Peter Shepherd (25 August 1841 – 22 January 1879) was a British Army doctor.

He was born at Leochel-Cushnie, Aberdeenshire. In 1851, he was living at his father's 50-acre farm Craigmill, with his parents, Peter (aged 50), Mary (aged 38), younger brother James, sister Mary Ann, his 19-year-old cousin Peter, as well as 16-year-old farm labourer John Edwards. He is listed in the census as a "scholar". At 19, he was lodging in 37 Bonaccord Street, Old Machar, Aberdeen and studying medicine at the University of Aberdeen.

He joined the medical service of the Army on 30 September 1864 and was sent to the Cape of Good Hope. He was quartered near Grahamstown, where he treated "Caffres as well as Europeans". His first salaries were used to pay back the friends who had supported his studies. From there, he was posted to Ireland, then India, before being forced to return home in 1872 in poor health and assigned a post at the recently opened Royal Herbert Hospital, Woolwich, London.

He was promoted to Surgeon Major on 30 September 1876 whilst still at Woolwich. In 1878, Surgeon-Major Shepherd, together with Colonel Francis Duncan established the concept of teaching first aid skills to civilians. Duncan was a fellow graduate of Aberdeen University, a career artillery officer and a deeply religious man with high humanitarian values who strongly supported the principle of battlefield ambulance transport He later wrote a history of the Royal Artillery and was elected to Parliament as a Conservative. Both Shepherd and Duncan were active members of the Presbyterian Church at Woolwich. Shepherd, together with a Dr Coleman, conducted the first class in the hall of the Presbyterian school in Woolwich using a comprehensive first aid curriculum that he had developed. It was Shepherd who first used the English term "first aid for the injured". Shepherd's last service was to prepare a manual at the request of the Central Ambulance Committee of the "Order of St John of Jerusalem in England, Ambulance Department" for use by Metropolitan Police and other ambulance classes.

He did not have time to revise this work when he received orders to leave for South Africa again. Dr (later Lieutenant General Sir) James Cantlie, another graduate of Aberdeen University, later published Shepherd's lesson notes from that course as "First Aid to the Injured". It was not long before the newly formed St. John Ambulance was using this manual in other public courses in cities throughout Britain.

In 1879, he was with the troops that crossed Tugela River into the Zulu kingdom. Outmanoeuvred by King Cetshwayo, the troops were ambushed and heavily defeated at the Battle of Isandlwana. With no soldiers to protect him, Shepherd attempted to move a wagon of wounded troops back to Rorke's Drift. The ambulance was quickly overrun, its remains being left on the field for months. The wounded soldiers were hauled out and killed, and Shepherd was put to death.

There is no grave marker for Peter Shepherd at Isandlwana. Shepherd was attending to George MacLeroy of the Natal Carbineers; eyewitness Andrew Muirhead stated that Shepherd was killed by a thrown assegai shortly afterwards. Surgeon Major Shepherd's pony was recognised later by Surgeon Major Reynolds VC as it was ridden back to the camp at Rorke's Drift by a native soldier.

A memorial brass was placed on the wall of the Royal Victoria Hospital Chapel at Netley with the inscription "In memory of Peter Shepherd, M.B., University of Aberdeen, Surgeon-Major Her Majesty's Army; born at Leochel Cushnie, Aberdeenshire, 25 August 1841; who sacrificed his own life at the battle of Isandhlwane, Zululand, 22 January 1879, in the endeavour to save the life of a wounded comrade. Erected by his brother officers and friends." The committee that arranged the Shepherd Memorial for the Netley Chapel also placed a marble tablet to his memory in the graveyard of Leochel Cushnie Church and founded a "Shepherd Gold Medal" to be competed for annually as a surgical prize in the University of Aberdeen.

== See also ==
- Royal Army Medical Corps
