= William Miller (Australian Presbyterian minister) =

The Rev William Miller (sometimes Millar) (1815–1874) was a Scots-born minister of the Free Presbyterian Church of Victoria who served the John Knox Church, cnr Little Lonsdale and Swanston streets, Melbourne 1851–64, and was the first Chairman of the council of Scotch College, Melbourne.

Miller should not be confused with his contemporary Rev William Baird Millar/er, who belonged to the United Presbyterian Church of Victoria 1851–53, and never held a charge but engaged chiefly in teaching.

== Life and ministry ==
He was born on 4 August 1815 in East Kilpatrick the son of John Miller and Isabella Wilson. He studied Divinity at New College, Edinburgh.

Miller was licensed by the Free Church of Scotland Presbytery of Linlithgow on 14 August 1849, and was ordained for Melbourne, Victoria on 17 April and arrived in Melbourne on 11 September. He was received by the Free Presbyterian Church of Victoria on 22 September, and appointed to the oversight of the John Knox Church in Swanston Street, its founding minister James Forbes having died the previous month. His ministrations were so acceptable that the congregation soon extended a call to him, which he accepted, and was inducted into the charge on 16 December.

Miller laboured faithfully as a minister of the Free Presbyterian Church of Victoria, and was spoken of as "highly esteemed", "possessing good abilities", "amiable in character" and "commanding the love and respect of the community". However, he did not have the vision or capacity of James Forbes.

Miller had arrived in Melbourne the same day as Robert Lawson, the rector appointed by the Free Church of Scotland for the Academy planned by James Forbes and later known as Scotch College. On 9 November 1851 the Free Presbyterian Synod appointed Miller Convener of the Academy Committee (the other members were the members of the Session of John Knox Church), and so he may be regarded as the first Chairman of the College Council. In 1853 Miller, along with Rev Duncan MacDiarmid Sinclair (1816-1887), Rev John Tait (1809-60), John Armstrong (1810-1857) of Bush Station and Archibald Bonar, merchant, were appointed the first trustees of the East Melbourne site of Scotch College. Miller was subsequently replaced as Convener of the Academy Committee by Dr. Adam Cairns (1802-1881).

In 1853, Miller was appointed to the church committee which was to investigate and potentially negotiate the basis for union with the various Presbyterian denominations in Victoria. A union basis between the Free Presbyterian Church of Victoria and the Church of Scotland Synod of Victoria was drafted, but by 1856 Miller opposed further negotiations due to disputation over the doctrinal standards, legislative basis and ministerial supply. The John Knox congregation supported this stand by resolution at a congregational meeting in August 1856. Of his own denomination, "he hoped they would have grace and courage to maintain their own integrity and consistency by refusing all further negotiations until this point (i.e. the legislative basis) should be conceded".

Miller and several other opponents of union on the proposed basis were expelled by the majority in April 1857, through an apparently illegal motion of 26 paragraphs by Dr. Cairns. A minority synod of the Free Presbyterian Church of Victoria, of which Miller became the moderator on 14 April continued. It became the only Free Presbyterian Synod when the majority, with the blessing of the Free Church of Scotland, entered into the union forming the Presbyterian Church of Victoria in April 1859 on a basis drawn up in 1858.

Funds were raised to send Miller to Scotland to represent the interests of the minority at the May 1860 Assembly of the Free Church of Scotland. The Assembly would not receive him as a deputy of the Free Presbyterian Church of Victoria, but only as one of a body "calling itself" the Free Presbyterian Church of Victoria. This he declined. On the advice of friends, he appealed to appear by way of petition as an individual. The Assembly urged reconciliation and reunion.

The rebuff by the Assembly did not help stability in the Victorian Synod, and this was aggravated by the May 1861 Assembly undertaking, by a vote of 341 to 64, to recognise the minority only if they ceased to claim they represented the position formerly occupied by the Free Presbyterian Church of Victoria. In May 1864 the Free Presbyterian Synod divided down the middle and Miller took the side of those who thought union with the Presbyterian Church of Victoria was appropriate. At the close of the year he submitted his resignation from the ministry of John Knox Church, citing the poor health of his wife, although the difficult church situation must also have been relevant. The congregation sided with those opposed to union but ultimately joined the union church in 1867 through the influence of a visiting Scottish minister, Rev James Oswald Dykes (1835-1912). The kind of union that occurred in Victoria in 1859 did not occur in Scotland until 1900 and 1929.

Miller returned to Britain around March 1865, where he served the English Presbyterian Church at St Helens, Lancashire for some years, before he retired to Callander in Scotland. He suffered a heart attack during a journey, and died at the newly constructed Callander railway station on 10 August 1874 aged 59.

== Family ==
He married Mary Brisbane (1818-1894), an industrial school teacher from Paisley, in West Calder on 21 March 1851. No children have been identified to date.

== Publications ==
- Letter on the Position and Necessities of the Free Presbyterian Church of Victoria, to the General Assembly of the Free Church of Scotland (Glasgow 1860, 32pp)
- Victorian Pulpit #5 (sermon, Melbourne n.d. [186-]).
- Free Presbyterian Church in Victoria (reprinted from Paisley Herald, Glasgow 1861, 20pp).
- Presbyterian Union in Australia - To the Editor of the Scottish Guardian (Glasgow 1861, 2pp).
- The Edinburgh Presbytery and the Australian Union (reprinted from The Witness, Edinburgh 1861, 12pp).
- Union in Victoria. Additional Extracts with remarks. (Edinburgh 1861, 4pp).

== Sources ==
- The Free Presbyterian Church of Australia by James Campbell Robinson, W.A. Hammer, Melbourne VIC 1947.
- The Bush Still Burns by Rowland S. Ward, Melbourne VIC 1989.
- Address on the Present Position of the Free Presbyterian Church of Victoria delivered at the Close of the Meeting of Synod on 18 April 1865, by the Moderator with Relative Correspondence etc. by Rev. Arthur Paul, Walker May, Melbourne VIC 1865.
- Minutes of John Knox Free Presbyterian Church, Swanston Street 22/11/1846-1/08/1865 PCEA Archives, Wantirna, Vic.
- Minutes of the Synod of the Free Presbyterian Church of Australia Felix (afterwards Victoria) from 9 June 1847 PCV Archives, Melbourne
