= Francis Macnab =

Australian Christian minister and psychologist (1931–2023)

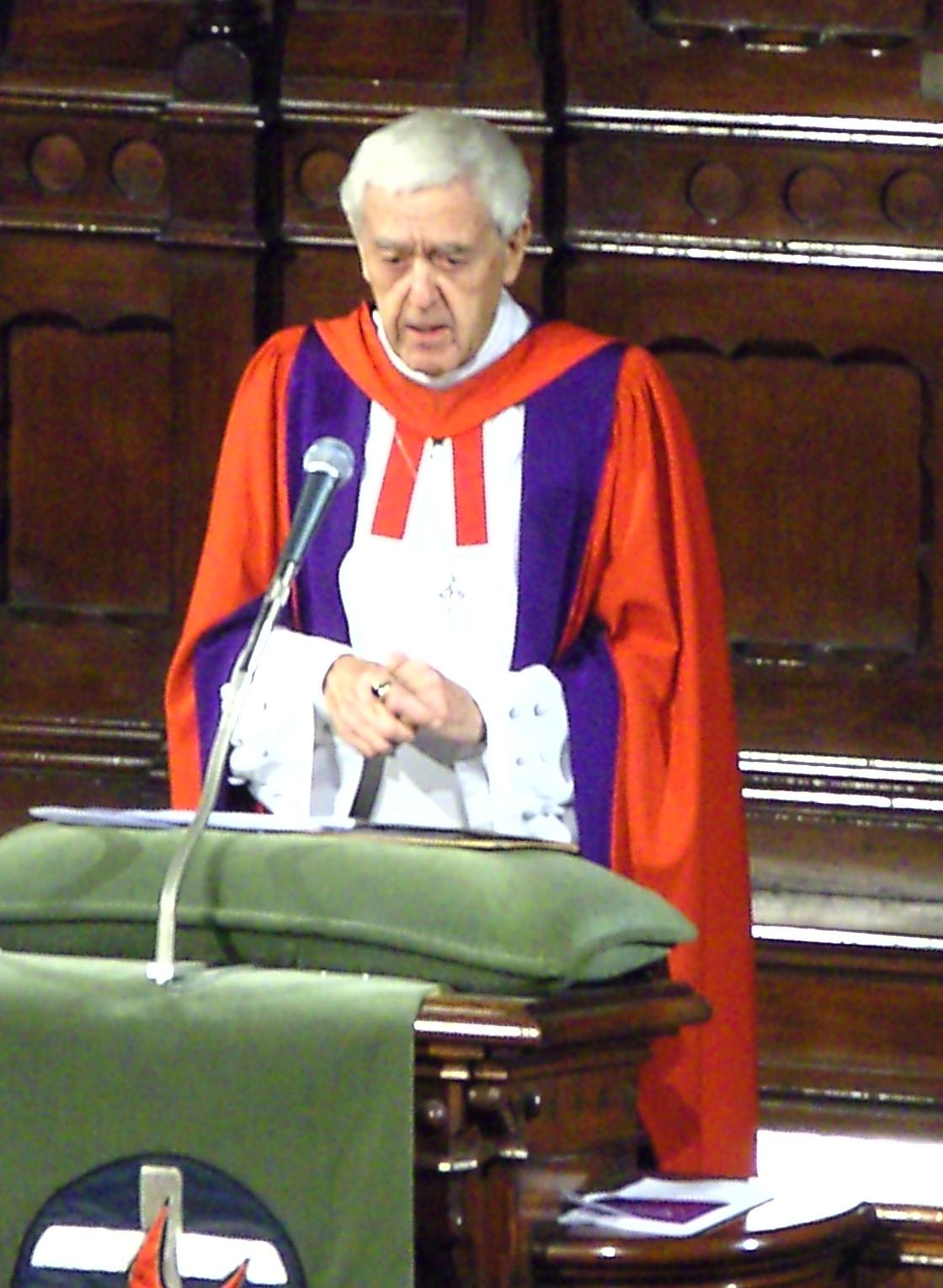
Macnab in 2012

Francis Macnab (21 June 1931 – 27 April 2023) was an Australian Christian minister. He was the executive minister of St Michael's Uniting Church, a congregation of the Uniting Church in Australia in Collins Street, Melbourne, until December 2016. He was a fellow of the Jesus Seminar.

== Early life ==
Macnab was born to J. D. Macnab and Mary Anne Louisa Hughes on 21 June 1931.

== Training and psychological work ==
Macnab held a Doctor of Divinity degree from the University of Aberdeen. He had honorary doctorates from the University of Melbourne and RMIT University in psychology and applied science.

In 1961, Macnab opened the Cairnmillar Institute, a clinical psychological centre, the largest in Australia, which was for some time the largest training body for psychologists and counsellors in the country. He continued as its executive director until 2015.

Macnab founded and was director of the Australian Foundation for Aftermath Reactions which provides trauma treatment and training. He was a Fellow of the Australian Psychological Society.

== Ministry ==
Following a ministry at Prahran Presbyterian Church from 1961 to 1970, Macnab became minister of the then Collins Street Congregational Church, now known as "St Michael's on Collins", in 1971. The church became a congregation of the Uniting Church in Australia at its inception in 1977. He retired on 31 December 2016.

=== Mingary ===
During his ministry, Macnab created "Mingary, the Quiet Place" a contemplative space at St Michael's open for members of the public for meditative and reflective experience. Mingary also offers low cost counselling.

== Theology ==
=== "A New Faith" ===
Banner proclaiming the "10 Commandments are the most negative document written"

In the 16 September 2008 edition of The Age, he said that "The old faith is in large sections unbelievable. We want to make the new faith more believable, realistic and helpful in terms of the way people live". The new faith was launched with a $120,000 advertising campaign including posters reading, "The Ten Commandments, one of the most negative documents ever written." Macnab described Moses as a mass murderer, Abraham as concocted and Jesus as a Jewish peasant and certainly not God.

==== Reaction ====
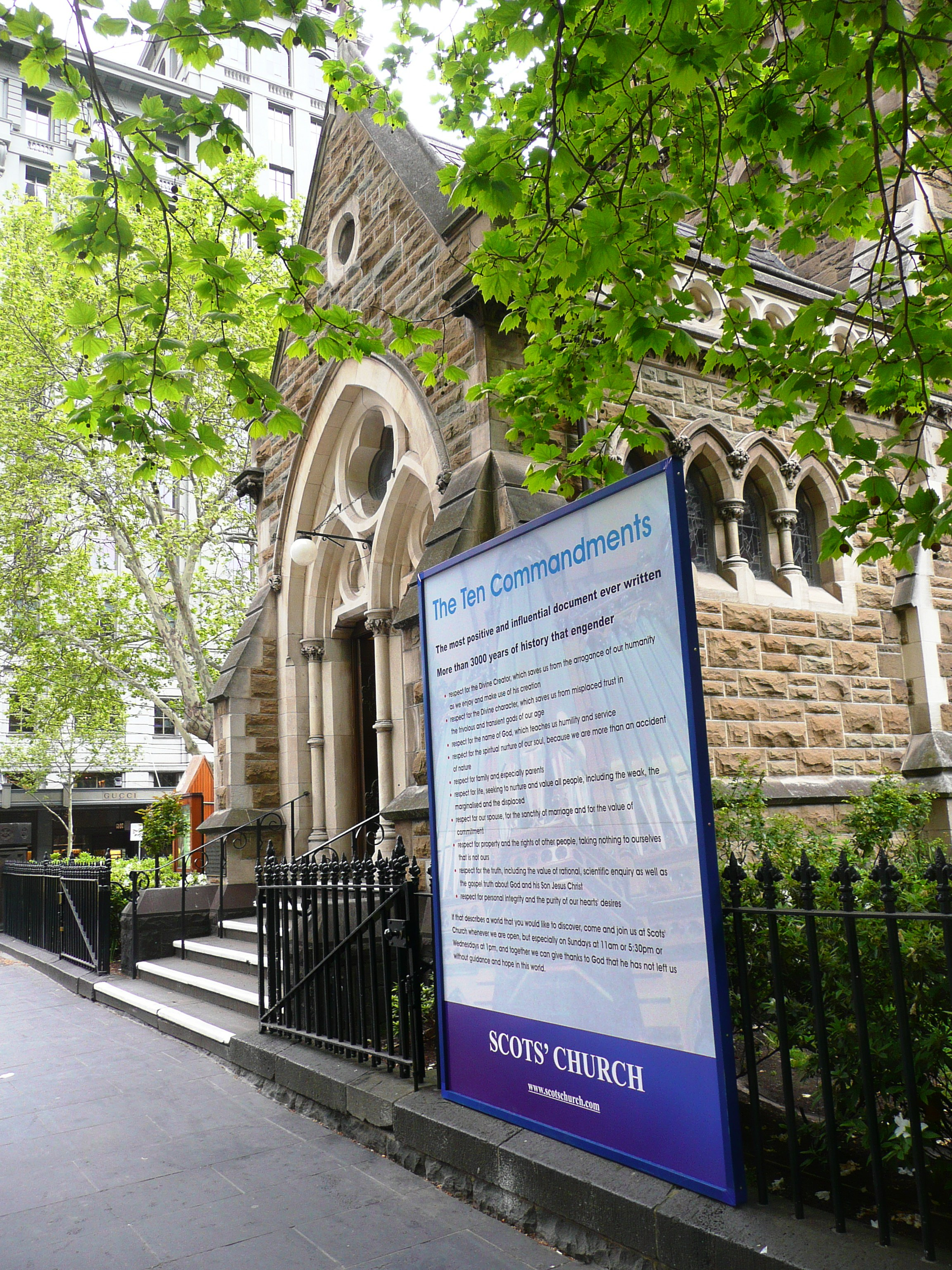
A poster published and displayed by Scots' Church in response to a poster from St Michael's Uniting Church describing the Ten Commandments as "one of the most negative documents ever written"

The moderator of the synod of Victoria and Tasmania, the Revd Jason Kioa, described Macnab's comments challenging the divinity of Jesus as questioning some of the faith's most basic beliefs, turning away from 2000 years of "orthodox Christian belief". The synod voted to request St Michael's Uniting Church to remove advertising for its new faith and apologise to Jews, Christians and Muslims for the comments it contained about the Ten Commandments. The Uniting Church did not move to discipline Macnab because no formal complaint had been received.

Scots' Church, a member church of the Presbyterian Church of Australia located across the road from St Michael's, installed a poster declaring benefits of the Ten Commandments facing towards St Michael's.

==== Macnab's response ====
In an interview with Stateline Victoria, Macnab replied to criticism saying that he was in agreement with others inside Christianity who "are asking the traditional church to re-examine and renew their basic thinking about what faith can be, because millions of people do not find the old faith meaningful to their lives." He said he "would expect that kind of reaction from people who take the scriptures far too literally."

In an address on 5 October, Macnab defended his comments, including against suggestions they were offensive to Jews, citing his study in undergraduate and postgraduate work in Hebrew language and history, including distinctions, and saying "Some of the comments have been knee-jerk reactions, uninformed and heavily overloaded with bad manners." He also stated, "While I have no intention of denigrating the Ten Commandments as a sacred symbol of the Jewish Torah and the Old Covenant, I say they are negative." He gave eight reasons why he believes the Ten Commandments to be negative and outlined his alternative 10 commandments, which he described as "positive, plausible and powerful".

1. Believe in a Good Presence in your life. Call that Good Presence: God, G-D – and follow that Good presence so that you live life fully – tolerantly, collaboratively, generously and with dignity.
2. Believe in a God-Presence in your life that will lift you constantly to live harmoniously in yourself and with others, always searching for your best health and happiness.
3. Take care of your home, your environments, your Planet and its vital resources for the life and health of people in all the world.
4. Be kind and caring of the animals, the birds, and the creatures of land and the rivers and the seas.
5. Help people develop their potential and become as fully functioning human beings as is possible from birth, through traumas and triumph to the end of their days.
6. Be magnanimous and excessive in your support of good causes, and use your affluence and material goods and scientific skills in altruistic concern for the future of the world.
7. Study ways to encourage and sustain the dignity, hope and integrity of all human beings and study ways to help all human beings embrace their dignity, hope, and integrity.
8. Be alive to new possibilities, new ways, and to the unfolding mysteries and wonders of life and the world.
9. We often focus our lives on many things and pursuits that promise our fulfilment. Study the deeper things of the Spirit, and the things of ultimate concern for all human beings. Be part of an evolving life-enhancing Faith that will also bring a new resilience to the future.
10. Take time to worship the great Source of all the positive transforming energies of life, and search to be at one with "the spirit of the good, the tender and the beautiful"

=== In the media ===
In February 2010, a billboard was posted on the Monash Freeway with pictures of Florence Nightingale, Martin Luther King Jr. and Macnab. St Michael's Church's website said that while Nightingale "gave people faith in the future that kept their spirits alive" and King "started a movement that shaped attitudes of acceptance of others", Macnab "speaks to us about how a new faith can energise our bodies and spirits that is necessary to accept ourselves in a greater way, and also accept others in a spirit of generosity and open-mindedness."

The Age newspaper reported that Macnab had posted the billboard "with pictures of Florence Nightingale, Martin Luther King and himself as model leaders". It also reported accusations of self-promotion. Macnab said that the billboard was intended to give the new faith a lift for 2010 and show that individuals could make a big difference.

== Personal life and death ==
Macnab married his wife, Sheila, in 1958. They had two daughters and a son.

Francis Macnab died on 27 April 2023, aged 91.

== Honours ==
Macnab was made a member of the Order of Australia for his contributions to psychotherapy and religion.
