= Presbyterian Church of Eastern Australia =

- Classification: Protestant
- Orientation: Calvinism
- Origin: 1846; Sydney
- Separated from: "Synod of Australia in connexion with the Established Church of Scotland" in 1846
- Absorbed: Union achieved in 1953 with Free Presbyterian Church of Victoria
- Separations: 1979 Australian Free Church
- Congregations: 11
- Members: 500

The Presbyterian Church of Eastern Australia (PCEA) is a small Presbyterian denomination which was formed in Sydney on 10 October 1846 by three ministers and a ruling elder. As of December 2024 it consists of 11 pastoral charges with a total of 14 regular preaching places, 6 serving ministers, 2 ministers without charge, 3 retired ministers and a community of about 500 (including about 350 communicant members).

== Origins ==
In October 1840 the Presbyterian ministers then in mainland Australia formed the "Synod of Australia in connection with the Established Church of Scotland". However, the movement in the Established Church of Scotland, which resulted in the exodus of about 40% of the ministers in 1843 to form the Free Church of Scotland, had repercussions in Australia. Ultimately the Australian Synod decided to retain its legal and moral connection with the Established Church despite the acceptance of what was considered improper State interference by that body, contrary to the Confession of Faith. This led to Rev William McIntyre (Maitland), Rev John Tait (Parramatta), Rev Colin Stewart (Bowenfels) and Samuel Martin (Hunter elder) protesting and constituting a new Synod on the original basis. While independent of the Free Church of Scotland, the PCEA received its ministers from that source in the early years. In far-off Melbourne, James Forbes of Scots Church also protested and withdrew. He formed the Free Presbyterian Church of Australia Felix (afterwards Victoria). The remnant of this body joined the PCEA in 1953.

== History ==
The revolution caused by the discovery of gold in 1851, brought more ministers and a vastly increased population. The three Presbyterian divisions then existing in Australia – representing the Established, Free and United Presbyterian Church of Scotland streams – achieved union over the years 1859/1865. Sections of the latter two streams remained apart, the Free because of the practical compromise considered to be involved in the united body receiving ministers from the different streams, despite the Free Church of Scotland policy from 1858 being in favour of colonial unions. It was considered that diversity of view at this point established an attitude which would lead to diversity on other points at the very heart of the faith. There was also concern that toleration of a view point found among United Presbyterians could lead to the secular ideal of the state, which indeed developed in the 20th century. The PCEA became a very active body, although short of ministers until 1853.

Seven of the 22 PCEA ministers in November 1864 stayed out of the union. Most early PCEA members were Highland Scots or conservative Irish Presbyterians. The PCEA grew to 12 ministers within a few years of 1864, despite the death of early leaders, but suffered a serious schism in 1884 over the training of students. This was not healed until the 20th century, and much ground was lost. A section of the Brushgrove-Grafton congregation was not reconciled and joined the Free Presbyterian Church of Scotland in 1911. [The descendants of this group have a church in Grafton and another in Riverstone (Sydney).] Additionally there was no recognition by the Free Church of Scotland from 1864 until after 1900, when close relations were resumed with the section that stayed outside the union which formed the United Free Church of Scotland in 1900. There was a painful dispute in the 1970s which led to a minister who made exaggerated claims for the Authorised (King James) Version of the Bible being removed in 1979. The repercussions contributed to several ministers joining the Presbyterian Church of Australia. The English Standard Version or the New King James Version are the most generally used translations at present, although the denomination does not hold a formal view on this issue. Of recent times the church has been stable with increasing diversity of ethnic origins represented in its membership and ministerial ranks. Until recent years the membership was largely outside major cities. Currently (2017) about 60% of the following is in the capital cities of Brisbane, Sydney and Melbourne.

== Distinctive position ==
The PCEA is distinguished from the Presbyterian Church of Australia (PCA) by adherence to "the whole doctrine" of the Confession of Faith as adopted by the Church of Scotland in 1647 and vindicated in the Scottish Disruption of 1843. It does not have what it considers an ambiguous Declaratory Statement, such as that of the PCA, which includes allowance of "liberty of opinion on matters not essential to the doctrine" without defining what is essential. Despite this difference there have been many strong connections with the PCA, particularly since it has moved to a more conservative theological position since 1977. One minister served as Professor in the PCA's Theological College in Melbourne (1977–81), another as Principal of Presbyterian Ladies' College (Melbourne) (1986–97), and another has written extensively on Australian Presbyterian history.

The PCEA is often noted for its practice of exclusive psalmody. This is the maintenance of the older pre-1870 approach to public worship among Presbyterians in which the 150 psalms of the Word of God in metrical form were exclusively used, and without instrumental accompaniment. The Scottish Psalter of 1650 was traditionally used in the PCEA, but is now supplanted in most congregations by more modern versions either the version produced by Melbourne PCEA in 1991, or the version produced by the Free Church of Scotland in 2003. The principle behind the practice of exclusive psalmody is that Scripture should regulate our worship and that we cannot do better than to use the Word of God in the public worship. The actions of the Free Church of Scotland in November 2010 in relaxing its stance on a capella psalmody have no bearing on the practice of the PCEA.

== Organisation ==
The PCEA’s supreme assembly is a Synod which meets annually hosted by one of the congregations. The PCEA has a long-standing arrangement enabling ready interchange of ministers with the Free Church of Scotland, and is a member of the International Conference of Reformed Churches (ICRC). More recently, interchange of ministers with the Reformed Churches of New Zealand (2006) and with the Orthodox Presbyterian Church in the US (2007), both also ICRC members, has been approved. The PCEA does not operate its own theological college, but has trained ministers in the Free Church of Scotland College, Edinburgh, at the Reformed Theological College, Geelong, and, more recently, in the training institutions of the mainline Presbyterian Church, supplemented in certain subjects. In Victoria it has friendly relations with the Reformed Presbyterian Church of Australia which has congregations at Geelong, Frankston and MacKinnon, and whose presence in Australia also dates from colonial times.

The current communicant membership (31/12/2017) is about 450 with a total community of about 800. At the same date there were 11 ministers in pastoral charges and another seconded to provide leadership for Australian Indigenous Ministries (formerly Aboriginal Inland Mission). A significant work has developed among Sudanese refugees in Melbourne, with one minister from the Nuer people of South Sudan.

The main centres are:

- Northern Presbytery: Brisbane (Wooloowin); Northern Rivers (Maclean, Grafton); Hastings (Wauchope, Port Macquarie)
- Central Presbytery: Manning (Taree); Hunter (Queens Avenue, Cardiff, Raymond Terrace); Sydney: St Georges, 201a Castlereagh Street, Mount Druitt, Bexley North
- Southern Presbytery: Geelong (Newcomb), Melbourne - Knox (Wantirna), All Nations (Mulgrave); Carrum Downs; Narre Warren; Ulverstone, Tasmania

== See also ==
- List of Presbyterian and Reformed denominations in Australia
- Presbyterian polity
