= William McIntyre (minister) =

William McIntyre (6 March 1806 – 12 July 1870) was a Scottish-Australian Presbyterian minister and educator.

== Early life ==
William McIntyre was the fifth son and seventh child of Duncan McIntyre and Catherine Kennedy, who were sheep farmers in the parish of Kilmonivaig, Inverness-shire, Scotland. He was proficient in Latin and Greek when he commenced at the University of Glasgow in 1823. He graduated MA in 1829, completed Divinity in 1832, and was licensed by the Presbytery of Dunoon. He taught in a Glasgow school conducted by his older brother Allan and was recruited for Australia by Dr John Dunmore Lang, who heard him preach in Greenock in 1837. He was ordained for Australia with his friend James Forbes on 29 June 1837 by the Church of Scotland Presbytery of Glasgow. He was appointed Chaplain to some 260 immigrants on the Midlothian, which left Portree, Skye on 7 August 1837 and arrived in Sydney 12 December 1837.

== Early Australian ministry ==
McIntyre was the first Gaelic-speaking minister in Australia and the immigrants who came out on the Midlothian mainly spoke that language. Lang falsely represented to Governor Gipps that Lord Glenelg had given public assurances that they would be allowed to settle as a group, which was contrary to the usual policy. Most became occupiers of small but productive farms on Andrew Lang's estate on the Paterson River. Particularly from 1857 they began to move north as new lands were opened and formed the nucleus of most of the congregations that adhered to the Presbyterian Church of Eastern Australia minority which remained outside the general Presbyterian union of 1864/65.

McIntyre joined Lang's Synod in January 1838, taught at Lang's Australian College, and acted as Lang's locum tenens while Lang was overseas from January 1839 to March 1841. He facilitated the union of Lang's Synod and the Presbytery which was accomplished in October 1840. McIntyre was called to Maitland in 1840, but was only settled there in September 1841 following a second call. On 3 April 1844 he was married to Mary McIntyre (1786–1872), the sister and heir of Peter McIntyre (1783–1842) by James Forbes. They made the Pitnacree Estate at east Maitland their home. Peter's estate exclusive of runs and licence for over 280,000 acres (1,100 km^{2}) of land was sworn at not less than £25,000, so Mary was exceedingly wealthy. There were no children and most of the money found its way into church and charitable causes in due time.

== Presbyterian Church of Eastern Australia ==
McIntyre led those who protested and withdrew to form the Presbyterian Church of Eastern Australia in October 1846. He partly financed the first PCEA church in Sydney, the old Pitt Street Congregational Church purchased in 1846. A brick church still existing was opened in Free Church Street, Maitland in 1849. McIntyre was anxious to see a thoroughly orthodox and evangelistic Church but was hampered by the difficulty of securing recruits prior to the discovery of Gold in 1851 and the tensions between Highlanders and Lowlanders. In 1854 he recruited his brother Allan and James McCulloch, who had married McIntyre's niece, for the PCEA ministry. McIntyre removed to St George's Church, Castlereagh Street, Sydney and was inducted 20 February 1862. He served without stipend and saw the debt of £12,000 reduced to £5,000 by the time of his death.

== Literary and educational work ==
McIntyre supervised the training of the first locally trained Presbyterian minister (J.S. White, ordained by the Synod of Australia in 1847). He edited Lang's newspaper The Colonist during the latter's absence overseas in 1839–40. He conducted a fortnightly paper, The Voice in the Wilderness (1846–1852). His major literary work was an Exposition of the Sermon on the Mount, published in Edinburgh in 1854. He established the high school of Maitland in 1855, took a number of classes, including classics, acted as headmaster without payment (1857–59) and made the school one of the best in New South Wales. As well as a number of booklets and pamphlets, McIntyre published The Testimony monthly (1865–70) until shortly before his death.

== Attitude to Church Union ==
Scottish attitudes to colonial church union changed in 1857 and those of Free Church sympathy who stood apart from the union in Victoria in 1859 were refused recognition by the Free Church of Scotland in 1860 and 1861. McIntyre therefore contemplated union of New South Wales Presbyterians and thought he had secured a satisfactory basis in November 1863; it was certainly a better crafted basis than in Victoria. However, some of his natural Gaelic constituency would not contemplate union with those allied to the Established Church of Scotland. Those in Maclean seceded in December 1863. McIntyre ultimately became convinced that while in theory the basis was satisfactory the use which the unionists planned to make of it was not. By receiving ministers from the various Scottish churches on an equal footing, the church became complicit in practical involvement in the errors of the Established Church, he held, and therefore compromised the PCEA testimony against Erastianism. He considered that this signalled an approach to truth that seemed capable of extension to other doctrines of the Westminster Confession of Faith. Ultimately 5 of the 22 PCEA ministers continued outside the union accomplished 1864/65, and several united who were not really in favour. The still-maintained practice of a capella psalmody in the PCEA was not regarded as an issue of principle on the level of the Erastian issue by McIntyre and his colleagues.

He was an able man, a solid if not winsome preacher. He was a man of firm principles of whom Sir Samuel Griffith, one time Premier of Queensland and the first Chief Justice of the High Court of Australia, wrote: "On the whole he was a remarkable man, and his name deserves to be remembered as one of the foremost worthies of New South Wales."
