= St Michael's Uniting Church, Melbourne =

St Michael's Uniting Church
- Collins Street Uniting Church
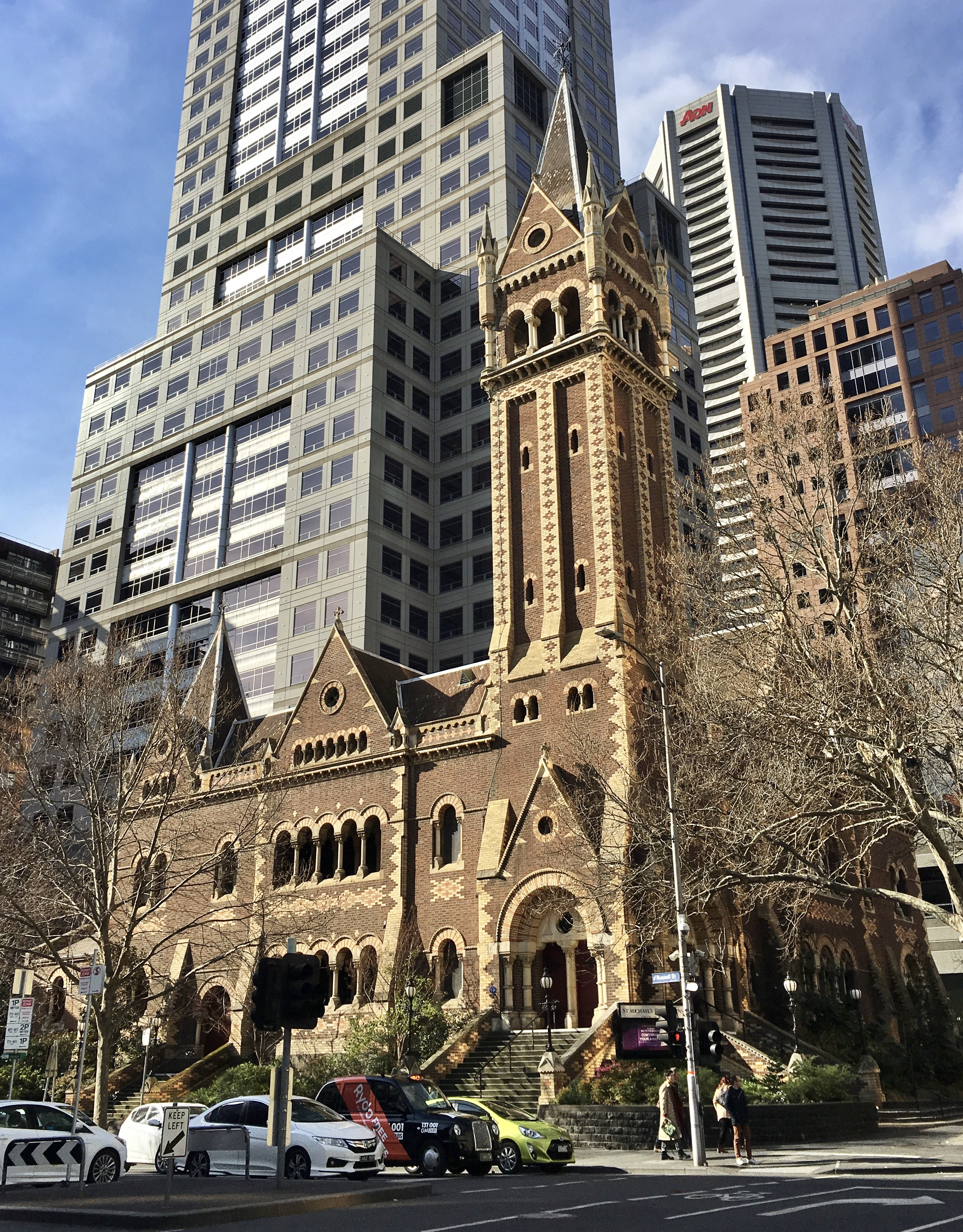
- St Michael's Uniting Church, Melbourne
- St Michael's Uniting Church
- 37°48′51.6″S 144°58′9.1″E
- Address: Corner of 120 Collins Street and Russell Street, Melbourne, Victoria
- Country: Australia
- Denomination: Uniting (since 1977)
- Website: stmichaels.org.au

History
- Former names: Collins Street Independent Church; Collins Street Congregational Church
- Founded: 1839
- Dedication: Saint Michael
- Dedicated: 1867

Architecture
- Architect: Joseph Reed
- Architectural type: Church
- Style: Lombardic Romanesque
- Years built: 1866–1867

Administration
- Parish: St Michael's Uniting

St Michael's Uniting Church is an Australian church located on Collins Street in central Melbourne, Victoria. Originally the Collins Street Independent Church, a Congregational Union of Australia church, St Michael's is now a congregation of the Uniting Church in Australia. The church became known as a centre of liberal theology and political radicalism under its long-serving minister Francis Macnab from 1971 to 2016. In 2020, the church appointed the Reverend Margaret Mayman as its minister.

== History ==
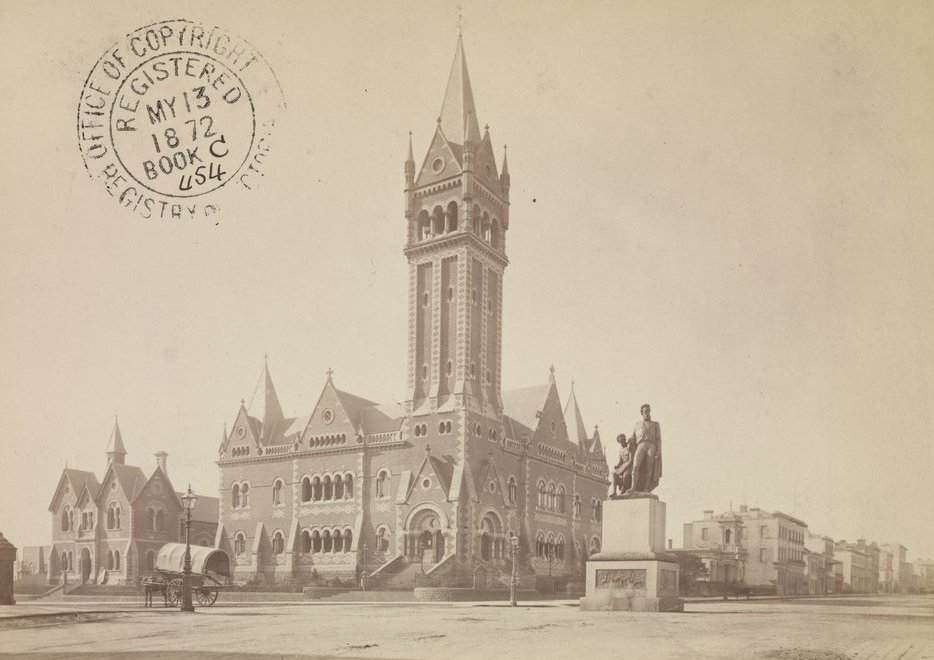
Congregational Church 1872, now known as St Michael's Uniting Church State Library Victoria H96.160/1701

The first church on the site was built in 1839–41, one of the first churches in the Port Phillip District (now the state of Victoria). Following the appointment of the Rev. A. M. Henderson, that structure was demolished in 1863 to make way for the present building, completed in 1866. It was designed by architect Joseph Reed, who had also designed the Melbourne Town Hall, and later the Royal Exhibition Building. It is classified by the National Trust of Australia and listed by Heritage Victoria.

In 1978 the interior underwent a major restoration, refurbishment and modification of the church was undertaken, raising the communion table, replacing the lectern, the choir and organ console moved, and the timber pews replaced with padded metal ones. Two candelabras flank the communion table representing the 'Divine presence' and the 'Light of the World'.

As part of the Australian Bicentenary in 1988, new stained glass windows by artist Klaus Zimmer were installed in the ground floor. The windows tell of the journey of humanity from the experience of aloneness and questioning towards the symbolic gateway of the New Jerusalem.

St Michael's was previously known as the Independent Church and the Congregational Church before it was given its present name in 1990. In 1991, the office tower development 120 Collins Street that surrounds the church was completed, built in part on church owned land.

== Architecture ==
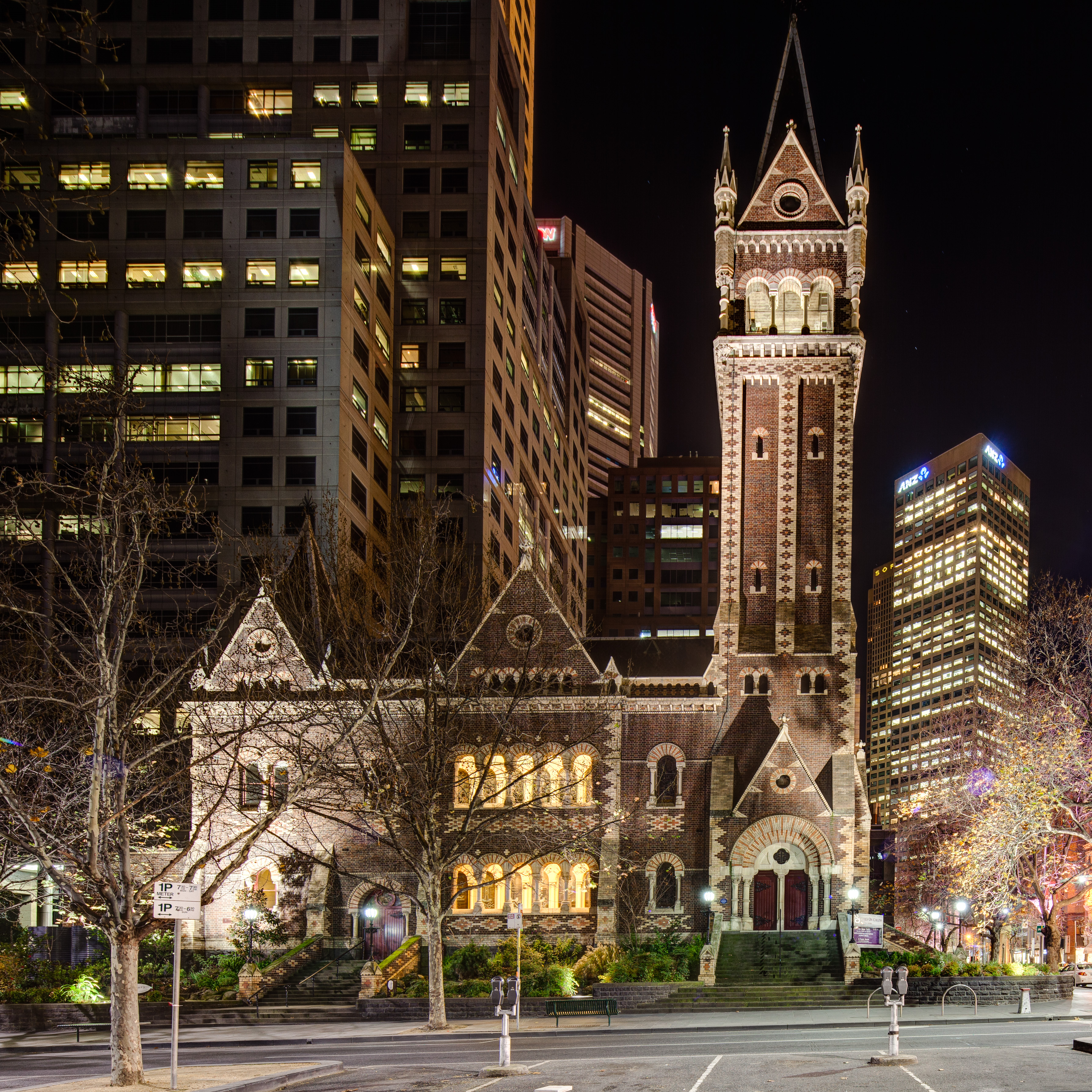
St Michael's Church at night

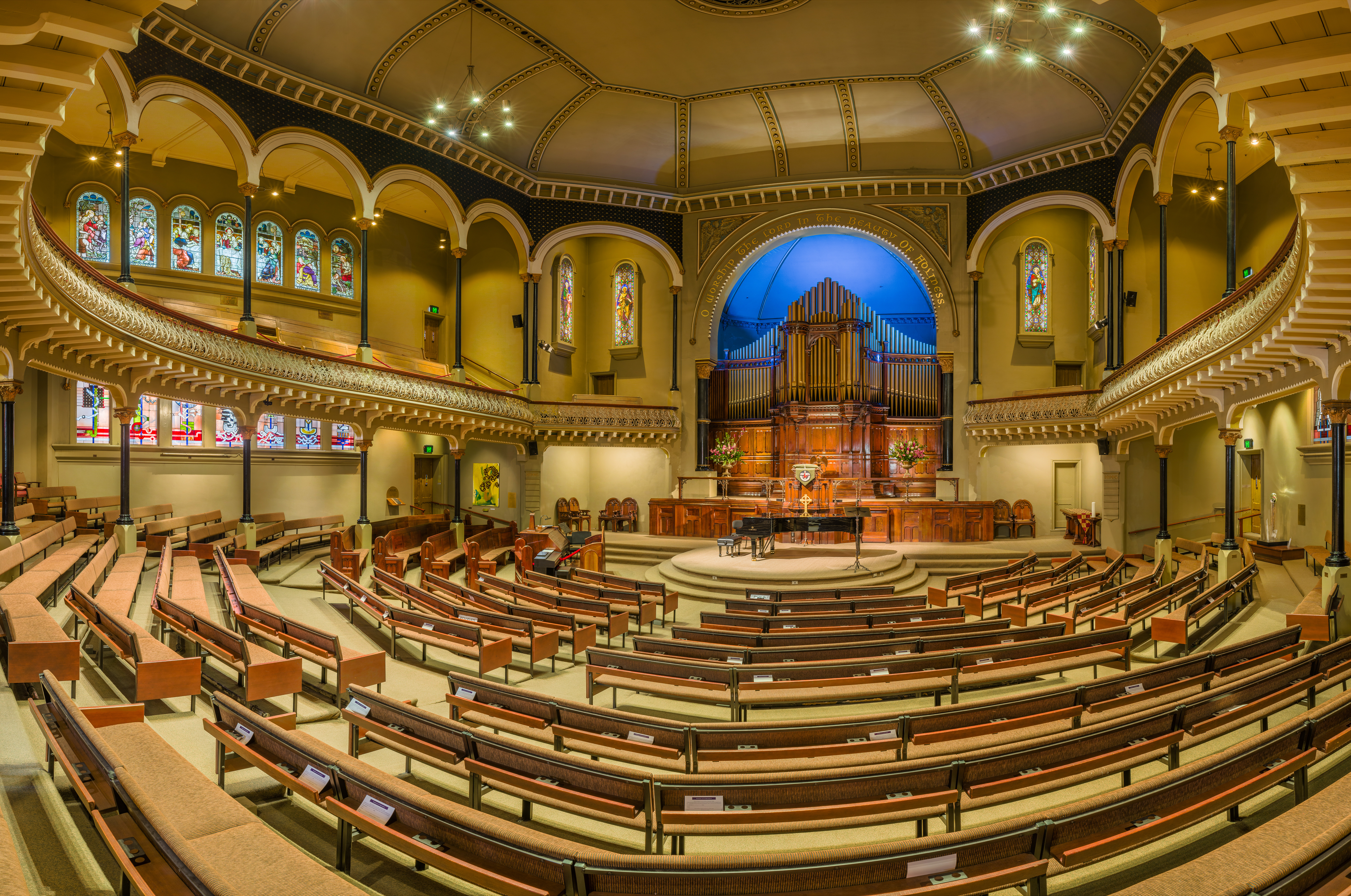
The interior of St Michael's Church as viewed from slightly right of centre looking towards the central organ

The building is described as Lombardic Romanesque in style and is considered the first example of polychrome brickwork in Victoria, a style that became very popular for all manner of buildings by the 1880s. It features a tall square bell tower marking the important street corner, and round Romanesque arches around doors and windows and the open cloisters in each side.

The interior was designed in the form of a theatre auditorium, in accordance with the principles of the Congregationalist Church, as a place where all members of the congregation could both hear and see the preacher. It features a sloping floor with tiered seating, and a steep gallery behind a ring of high aches on slender cast iron columns, ensuring good sight lines.

== Recent ministers ==
=== Margaret Mayman (2020-2025) ===
The Reverend Margaret Mayman was inducted as minister with St Michael's Uniting Church in February 2020. Mayman was born in New Zealand and was ordained as a Presbyterian minister there in 1983. She holds a PhD in Christian social ethics from Union Theological Seminary in New York, where she lived, studied and taught for 12 years. She was a parish minister in New Zealand for 18 years before moving to Sydney in December 2013 to be the minister at Pitt Street Uniting Church.

Under Mayman's leadership, St Michael's has embraced an open and affirming message, where the LGBTQIA+ community, people with disabilities and First Nations people are encouraged to join the congregation. Mayman, a key figure in the Same-Sex Marriage plebiscite in Australia, has seen St Michael's "provide a sanctuary for LGBTQ people hurt by religious institutions".

=== Francis Macnab (1971–2016) ===
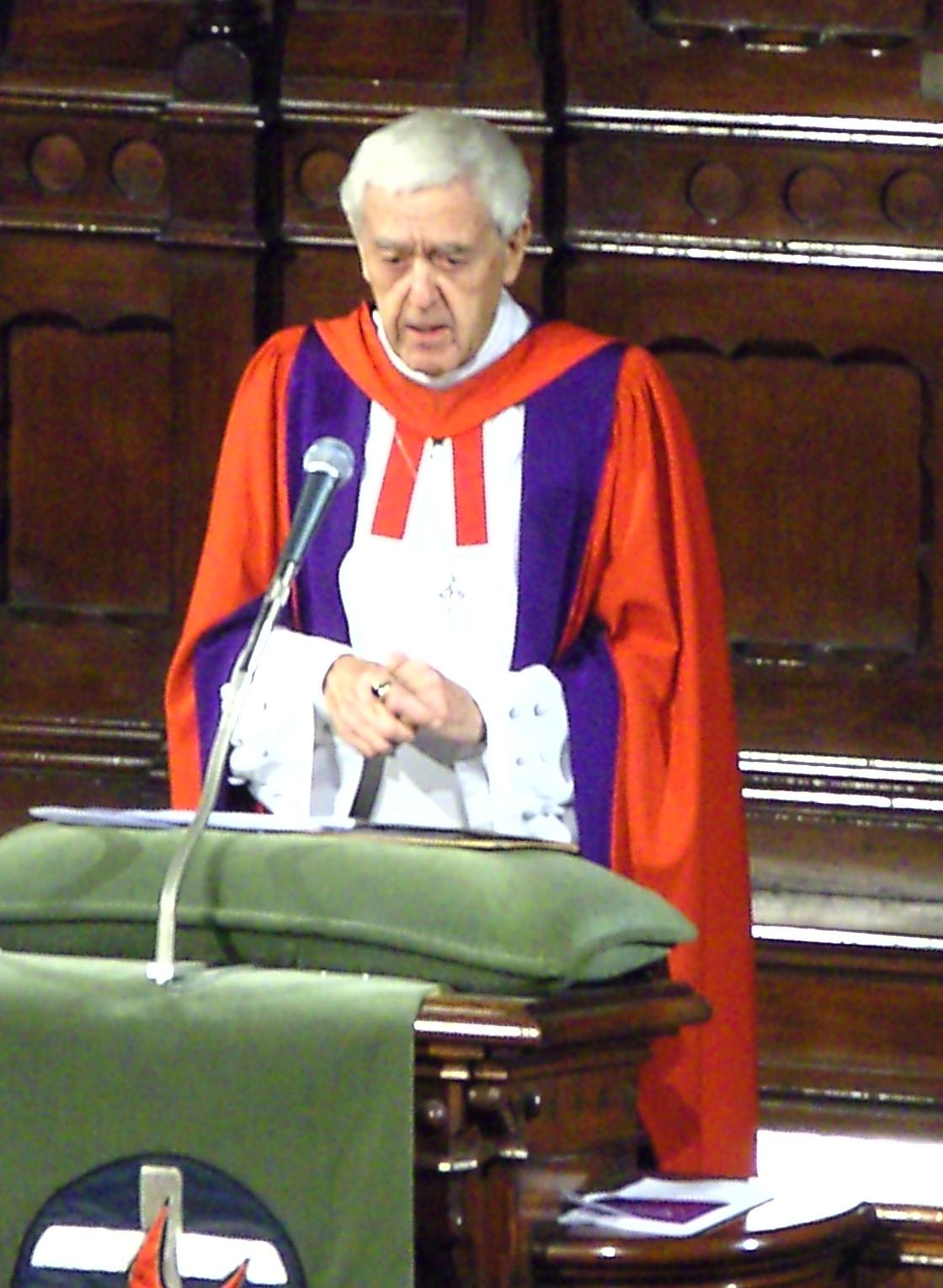
Macnab on 8 April 2012 (Easter Sunday service at St Michael's Church)

The Reverend Francis Macnab was the executive minister of St Michael's from February 1971 to December 2016. In addition to being a minister, Macnab was also the founder and previous executive director of the Cairnmillar Institute, a non-for-profit clinic for counselling available to the general public and a postgraduate school of psychology, counselling and psychotherapy. Macnab holds a Doctor of Divinity degree from the University of Aberdeen. He has honorary doctorates from the University of Melbourne and RMIT in psychology and applied science.

Through Cairnmillar and St Michael's, Macnab developed a healthy ageing program called Successful Ageing, Growth and Enjoyment (S.A.G.E.) for people aged over 55. He also recognised a need for The Big Tent Project, aimed at supporting kindergarten aged children living with mental health issues.

== Psychological services ==
"Mingary – the Quiet Place" is a contemplative space at St Michael's opened in 1999. Mingary-Cairnmillar Counselling Service also offers low-cost counselling. Mingary is run in conjunction with the Cairnmillar Institute, founded by previous minister Francis Macnab.
