= James Clow =

Scottish-Australian minister (1790–1861)

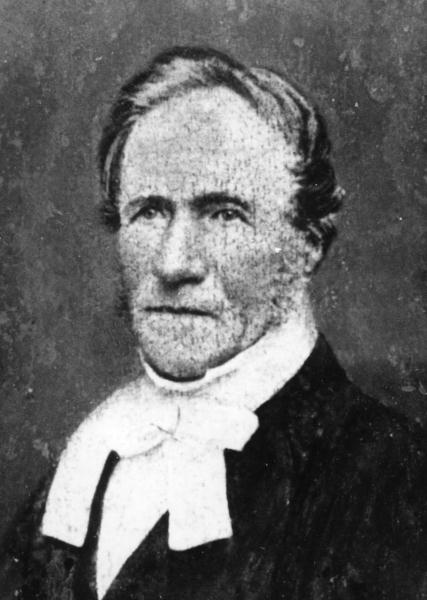
- Church: Church of Scotland; Presbyterian Church of Victoria

Personal details
- Born: 26 May 1790
- Died: 15 March 1861 (aged 70)

Moderator of General Assembly of the Presbyterian Church of Victoria
- In office 7 April 1859 – 1 November 1859

James Clow (26 May 1790 – 15 March 1861) was a Presbyterian minister, in the area which now consists of the outer-eastern suburbs of Melbourne, Australia.

== Early life and education ==
James Clow was born at Ardoch on 26 May 1790. He educated at the University of St Andrews. He was licensed to preach by the Presbytery of Kirkcaldy on 21 July 1813, He was subsequently appointed chaplain at Bombay by the Court of Directors H.E.I.C. on 8 December 1814, and ordained (by Presb of Kirkcaldy) on 5 April 1815.

== Work in Bombay ==
Clow arrived in Bombay on 8 November 1815, and on 15 December attended a meeting called by the government to select a site and consider plans for a church. He held his first meeting of kirk-session on 11 February 1816. Clow returned to Scotland on account of ill-health in October 1817. He was back in India on 10 March 1819 and opened St Andrew's church on 25 April following, Clow was frequently away for long periods on sick leave and retired from the service on 10 October 1833.

== Work in Melbourne ==
He returned to Scotland in 1833 and then headed to Hobart, Australia, in 1837. On Christmas Day 1837, he and his large family arrived in Melbourne. On 25 December 1837 he settled in Melbourne (then Port Phillip) and was the pioneer of Presbyterianism in New South Wales.

He conducted the first Church of Scotland service in the Port Phillip District on 31 December. In Melbourne he purchased 2 acres (8,100 m^{2}) of land on Swanston Street. The family initially lived in tents till he could have erected on the land a pre-fabricated house he brought with him from Hobart.

In August 1838 he leased the Corhanwarrabul run, an area which covered approximately 36 square miles (93 km^{2}), on which he built a settlement called 'Tirhartruan', and an out-station called 'Glen Fern'. The Aboriginals often visited he and his family at their homestead.

He sold the lease to John Wood Beilby in 1850. Tirhartruan was located on the north side of Wellington Road, just east of Dandenong Creek, and was the subject of an archaeological dig in the 1970s. The electoral ward of Tirhartruan in the City of Knox is named after Clow's homestead.

He preached and laboured among the colonists, taking no salary, and occupying no stated pastorate, and was the inspirer and founder of the Scots Church erected in Collins Street. Clow was elected first Moderator of the General Assembly of the Presbyterian Church of Victoria on 7 April 1859. He died on 15 March 1861, Father of the Church in Victoria. His portrait was in St Andrew's vestry, Bombay.

== Family ==
He married 13 April 1819, Margaret Morison, and had several children —

- James Maxwell, born 13 January 1820, died 1894
- Mary Elizabeth, born 27 June 1821, died a child
- Helen Johanna, born 24 October 1822, married Rev. James Forbes
- Margaret Jessie, born 28 January 1824, married Rev. Hamilton
- Mary Elizabeth, born 1 March 1825, died 16 December 1893, married Dr Wilkie
- Jane, born 3 and died 8 July 1828
- Jane, born 4 March 1830, married Dr Robertson
- Henry Monereiff, born 30 March 1832, died 29 March 1852
- Emma, born 1834, died 15th April, 1855
