= Head of the River (Queensland) =

Rowing event in Queensland, Australia

Coordinates: 26°44′28.94″S 153°07′24.51″E

The Queensland Head of the River refers to two high school rowing regattas in Queensland Australia, one for boys (Great Public Schools Association of Queensland Inc., G.P.S.) and one for girls (Brisbane Schoolgirls' Rowing Association, B.S.R.A.). The boys' regatta is held in mid to late March while the girls' regatta is held in late August to early September. Due to the lack of water at Wivenhoe Dam the boys' Head of the River was moved to Hinze Dam for 2006, and was then moved to Lake Kawana on the Sunshine Coast, Queensland the following year. Since the girls require 10 lanes for their regattas, the BSRA Head of the River was held at Hinze Dam from 2005 to 2007. However, due to construction work that was underway to increase the size of the dam, the BSRA Head of the River was also moved to Lake Kawana for the 2008 season. Both the GPS and BSRA competitions moved to Wyaralong Dam in 2017 following the opening of the Queensland State Regatta Centre the previous year.

== G.P.S. Head of the River ==
=== Participating Schools ===
Seven of the nine GPS schools compete at the annual Head of the River. Only GPS Schools can compete.

School	Location	Enrolment	Founded	Denomination	Day/Boarding	School Colours	Abbreviation	Nickname	In competition since
Anglican Church Grammar School	East Brisbane	1,700	1912	Anglican	Day & Boarding	Blue & Grey	ACGS	Churchie	1920
Brisbane Boys' College	Toowong	1,600	1902	Uniting Church	Day & Boarding	Green, White & Black	BBC	College	1918
Brisbane Grammar School	Spring Hill	1,400	1868	Non-Denominational	Day & Boarding	Dark Blue & Light Blue	BGS	Grammar	1918
Brisbane State High School	South Brisbane	3,361	1921	Non-Denominational	Day	Cerise & Navy Blue	BSHS	State High	1924
St Joseph's College, Gregory Terrace	Spring Hill	1,337	1875	Catholic	Day	Red & Black	GT	Terrace	1928
St Joseph's Nudgee College	Boondall	1,470	1891	Catholic	Day & Boarding	Blue & White	NC	Nudgee	2001
The Southport School	Southport	1,200	1901	Anglican	Day & Boarding	Maroon, Navy & White	TSS	Southport	1918

Gregory Terrace first competed in 1928, but did not compete again until 1954.

Between 1916 and 1985 the Anglican Church Grammar School (ACGS), was known as Church of England Grammar School (CEGS).

=== Early years ===
The first inter-school rowing contests took place in 1890 and 1891 between Brisbane Grammar School and Ipswich Grammar School. Following these initial competitions, a devastating flood in 1893 led to Ipswich Grammar School abandoning the sport.

From 1899 to 1909, Brisbane Grammar School and Maryborough Grammar School competed nine times, with races held alternately in Brisbane and Maryborough. Brisbane Grammar School were victorious in seven of these contests.

In 1908, Southport entered the competition and won on its first attempt. Southport continued its success, securing five more titles over the next six years. 1908 also marked the last appearance of Maryborough Grammar School in the competition.

Rockhampton Grammar School made its first and only appearance on the Brisbane River in 1913. However, Maryborough and Rockhampton Grammar Schools continued to compete against each other on the Mary and Fitzroy Rivers until Maryborough Grammar School closed in 1935.

Brisbane Grammar School claimed the championship titles in 1910 and 1917. Technical College High School entered the competition in 1915, winning both that year and the following year, 1916. Brisbane Boys' College, initially known as Clayfield College, joined the competition in 1917. Church of England Grammar School made its first appearance in 1920.

Southport, after winning the race in 1908, 1909, and 1911, secured the Smith Cup. Southport also won outright the Henderson Cup in 1914 and the Lawless Cup in 1921.

Year	1st	2nd	3rd	4th
1890	Ipswich Grammar	Brisbane Grammar		
1891	Brisbane Grammar	Ipswich Grammar		
1899	Brisbane Grammar	Maryborough Grammar		
1902	Maryborough Grammar	Brisbane Grammar		
1903	Brisbane Grammar	Maryborough Grammar		
1904	Brisbane Grammar	Maryborough Grammar		
1905	Maryborough Grammar	Brisbane Grammar		
1906	Brisbane Grammar	Maryborough Grammar		
1907	Brisbane Grammar	Maryborough Grammar		
1908	Southport	Brisbane Grammar	Maryborough Grammar	
1909	Southport	Brisbane Grammar		
1910	Brisbane Grammar	Southport		
1911	Southport	Brisbane Grammar		
1912	Southport	Brisbane Grammar		
1913	Southport	Rockhampton Grammar	Brisbane Grammar	
1914	Southport	Brisbane Grammar		
1915	Technical College High School	Southport	Brisbane Grammar	
1916	Technical College High School	Southport	Brisbane Grammar	
1917	Brisbane Grammar	Southport	Brisbane Boys' College	Technical College High School

=== Open 1st VIII – O'Connor Cup ===
The G.P.S. Head of the River, known then as the All Schools' Race, commenced in 1918 when the Secondary Schools' Association was formed. The O'Connor Cup was first presented in 1922 and is for perpetual competition. The race was contested in "fours" from 1918 to 1954, and in "eights" since 1955.

Year	Champions	2nd	3rd	Winning Time	Venue
1918	The Southport School	Brisbane Grammar	Brisbane Boys' College		Bridge Reach, Brisbane River
1919	Brisbane Boys' College	Technical College High School	Brisbane Grammar		Bridge Reach, Brisbane River
1920	The Southport School	Church of England Grammar	Brisbane Boys' College		Hamilton Reach, Brisbane River
1921	The Southport School	Church of England Grammar	Brisbane Grammar		Bridge Reach, Brisbane River
1922	Church of England Grammar	The Southport School	Brisbane Grammar		Bridge Reach, Brisbane River
1923	The Southport School	Brisbane Boys' College	Church of England Grammar		Bridge Reach, Brisbane River
1924	Brisbane Boys' College	Brisbane State High	Brisbane Grammar		Bridge Reach, Brisbane River
1925	Brisbane State High	Brisbane Boys' College	The Southport School		Bridge Reach, Brisbane River
1926	Church of England Grammar	The Southport School	Brisbane Grammar		Bridge Reach, Brisbane River
1927	Brisbane State High	The Southport School	Brisbane Boys' College		Bridge Reach, Brisbane River
1928	Brisbane State High & Brisbane Grammar		Brisbane Boys' College		Bridge Reach, Brisbane River
1929	Brisbane Grammar	The Southport School	Church of England Grammar		Bridge Reach, Brisbane River
1930	The Southport School	Brisbane Grammar	Church of England Grammar		Milton Reach, Brisbane River
1931	The Southport School	Brisbane Grammar	Brisbane Boys' College		Milton Reach, Brisbane River
1932	Brisbane State High	Brisbane Boys' College	Brisbane Grammar		Milton Reach, Brisbane River
1933	The Southport School	Brisbane Boys' College	Brisbane State High		Milton Reach, Brisbane River
1934	Brisbane Grammar	The Southport School	Brisbane State High		Milton Reach, Brisbane River
1935	Brisbane Boys' College	Church of England Grammar	The Southport School		Milton Reach, Brisbane River
1936	Church of England Grammar	Brisbane Grammar	Brisbane Boys' College		Milton Reach, Brisbane River
1937	Brisbane Boys' College	Church of England Grammar	Brisbane Grammar		Milton Reach, Brisbane River
1938	Brisbane Boys' College	Church of England Grammar	The Southport School		Milton Reach, Brisbane River
1939	Church of England Grammar	Brisbane Boys' College & Brisbane State High (tie)			Milton Reach, Brisbane River
1940	Church of England Grammar	Brisbane State High	Brisbane Boys' College		Milton Reach, Brisbane River
1941	Church of England Grammar	Brisbane State High	Brisbane Boys' College		Milton Reach, Brisbane River
1942	No race, World War II				
1943	No race, World War II				
1944	No race, World War II				
1945	No race, World War II				
1946	Brisbane Boys' College	Church of England Grammar	The Southport School		Milton Reach, Brisbane River
1947	Brisbane Boys' College	Church of England Grammar	The Southport School		Milton Reach, Brisbane River
1948	Brisbane State High	The Southport School	Church of England Grammar		Milton Reach, Brisbane River
1949	Brisbane Boys' College	Church of England Grammar	Brisbane Grammar		Milton Reach, Brisbane River
1950	Brisbane Boys' College	Brisbane State High	Brisbane Grammar		Milton Reach, Brisbane River
1951	Brisbane Boys' College	Church of England Grammar	Brisbane Grammar		Milton Reach, Brisbane River
1952	Brisbane Boys' College	The Southport School	Church of England Grammar		Milton Reach, Brisbane River
1953	The Southport School	Church of England Grammar	Brisbane Boys' College		Milton Reach, Brisbane River
1954	The Southport School	Brisbane Grammar	Brisbane Boys' College		Milton Reach, Brisbane River
1955	Brisbane Grammar	The Southport School	Church of England Grammar		Milton Reach, Brisbane River
1956	Brisbane Boys' College	The Southport School	Brisbane Grammar		Milton Reach, Brisbane River
1957	Brisbane Boys' College	The Southport School	Brisbane Grammar		Milton Reach, Brisbane River
1958	The Southport School	Gregory Terrace	Brisbane Grammar		Milton Reach, Brisbane River
1959	The Southport School	Gregory Terrace	Brisbane Grammar & Brisbane Boys' College (tie)		Milton Reach, Brisbane River
1960	Brisbane Grammar	The Southport School	Church of England Grammar	6 min 23.00 sec	Milton Reach, Brisbane River
1961	Brisbane Boys' College	Church of England Grammar	Brisbane Grammar	6 min 12.00 sec	Milton Reach, Brisbane River
1962	Brisbane Boys' College	Brisbane Grammar	Church of England Grammar	6 min 56.00 sec	Milton Reach, Brisbane River
1963	Church of England Grammar	Brisbane State High	Gregory Terrace	6 min 25.00 sec	Milton Reach, Brisbane River
1964	Brisbane Grammar	The Southport School	Brisbane State High	6 min 25.00 sec	Milton Reach, Brisbane River
1965	Brisbane Boys & Brisbane Grammar (tie)		Brisbane State High	5 min 40.25 sec	Milton Reach, Brisbane River
1966	Brisbane Boys' College	Brisbane State High	The Southport School	6 min 9.50 sec	Milton Reach, Brisbane River
1967	Brisbane Grammar	The Southport School	Brisbane State High	5 min 58.00 sec	Milton Reach, Brisbane River
1968	Brisbane Boys' College	Brisbane Grammar	Brisbane State High	5 min 43.00 sec	Milton Reach, Brisbane River
1969	Church of England Grammar	Brisbane State High	Brisbane Boys' College	6 min 5.00 sec	Milton Reach, Brisbane River
1970	The Southport School	Brisbane State High	Brisbane Boys' College	7 min 11.50 sec	Milton Reach, Brisbane River
1971	Church of England Grammar	Brisbane Grammar	Brisbane State High	6 min 28.50 sec	Milton Reach, Brisbane River
1972	Brisbane Boys' College	Brisbane Grammar	Church of England Grammar	6 min 24.30 sec	Milton Reach, Brisbane River
1973	Church of England Grammar	The Southport School	Brisbane Boys' College	5 min 51.70 sec	Milton Reach, Brisbane River
1974	Brisbane Boys' College	Brisbane State High	Church of England Grammar		Lake Kurwongbah
1975	Church of England Grammar	Brisbane Grammar	Brisbane Boys' College		Lake Kurwongbah
1976	Brisbane Grammar	Brisbane State High	The Southport School	6 min 30.70 sec	Lake Kurwongbah
1977	Brisbane Grammar	The Southport School	Brisbane State High	6 min 15.00 sec	Hinze Dam
1978	The Southport School	Brisbane State High	Brisbane Grammar	6 min 13.50 sec	Hinze Dam
1979	Brisbane Grammar	The Southport School	Church of England Grammar	6 min 19.20 sec	Hinze Dam
1980	Brisbane Grammar	Church of England Grammar	The Southport School	6 min 25.00 sec	Hinze Dam
1981	Brisbane Grammar	Gregory Terrace	Brisbane Boys' College		Hinze Dam
1982	Gregory Terrace	Brisbane Grammar	Brisbane Boys' College		Hinze Dam
1983	No Race				Hinze Dam
1984	Brisbane Grammar	The Southport School	Gregory Terrace		Hinze Dam
1985	The Southport School	Brisbane Grammar	Gregory Terrace		Hinze Dam
1986	The Southport School	Brisbane Grammar	Gregory Terrace		Hinze Dam
1987	The Southport School	Gregory Terrace	Brisbane Grammar		WIvenhoe Dam
1988	Brisbane Grammar	Gregory Terrace	Anglican Church Grammar		Wivenhoe Dam
1989	The Southport School	Brisbane Grammar	Brisbane Boys' College		Wivenhoe Dam
1990	Brisbane Boys' College	The Southport School	Anglican Church Grammar		Wivenhoe Dam
1991	The Southport School	Brisbane Boys' College	Anglcian Church Grammar		Wivenhoe Dam
1992	Brisbane Boys' College	Anglican Church Grammar	Brisbane Grammar		Wivenhoe Dam
1993	Brisbane Boys' College	The Southport School	Gregory Terrace		Wivenhoe Dam
1994	Gregory Terrace	Brisbane Boys' College	The Southport School	5 min 54 sec	Wivenhoe Dam
1995	Brisbane Grammar	Gregory Terrace	Brisbane Boys' College	5 min 48 sec	Wivenhoe Dam
1996	Gregory Terrace	Brisbane Grammar	Brisbane Boys' College	5 min 54 sec	Wivenhoe Dam
1997	Brisbane Grammar	Gregory Terrace	Brisbane Boys' College	5 min 46 sec	Wivenhoe Dam
1998	Anglican Church Grammar	Gregory Terrace	Brisbane Grammar	5 min 58 sec	Wivenhoe Dam
1999	Brisbane Grammar	Anglican Church Grammar	The Southport School	5 min 51 sec	Wivenhoe Dam
2000	The Southport School	Anglican Church Grammar	Brisbane Grammar	5 min 58 sec	Wivenhoe Dam
2001	Brisbane Grammar	The Southport School	Anglican Church Grammar	5 min 59 sec	Wivenhoe Dam
2002	Brisbane Boys' College	Brisbane Grammar	Nudgee College	5 min 59 sec	Wivenhoe Dam
2003	Nudgee College	Brisbane Boys' College	Brisbane Grammar	6 min 8 sec	Wivenhoe Dam
2004	Anglican Church Grammar	Brisbane Grammar	The Southport School	5 min 56 sec	Wivenhoe Dam
2005	Anglican Church Grammar	The Southport School	Gregory Terrace	5 min 15 sec (1.8 km)	Wivenhoe Dam
2006	The Southport School	Anglican Church Grammar	Nudgee College	5 min 53 sec	Hinze Dam
2007	Brisbane Grammar	Gregory Terrace	The Southport School	6 min 21.19 sec	Lake Kawana
2008	Gregory Terrace	Anglican Church Grammar	Nudgee College	6 min 4.99 sec	Lake Kawana
2009	Nudgee College	Gregory Terrace	Brisbane Grammar	6 min 2.30 sec	Lake Kawana
2010	Anglican Church Grammar	The Southport School	Nudgee College	6 min 3.10 sec	Lake Kawana
2011	Nudgee College	Anglican Church Grammar	Gregory Terrace	6 min 12.00 sec	Lake Kawana
2012	Anglican Church Grammar	Nudgee College	The Southport School	6 min 0.64 sec	Lake Kawana
2013	Nudgee College	Anglican Church Grammar	The Southport School	5 min 57.04 sec	Lake Kawana
2014	Nudgee College	Brisbane Boys' College	Anglican Church Grammar	6 min 11.31 sec	Lake Kawana
2015	Nudgee College	Anglican Church Grammar	The Southport School	5 min 45.30 sec	Lake Kawana
2016	Nudgee College	Anglican Church Grammar	Brisbane Boys' College	5 min 51.0 sec	Lake Kawana
2017	Nudgee College	The Southport School	Gregory Terrace	5 min 54.05 sec	Wyaralong Dam
2018	The Southport School	Nudgee College	Anglican Church Grammar	6 min 3.36 sec	Wyaralong Dam
2019	Nudgee College	Gregory Terrace	Anglican Church Grammar and The Southport School (tie)	6 min 00.87 sec	Wyaralong Dam
2020	Brisbane Grammar	The Southport School	Gregory Terrace	5 min 47.06 sec	Wyaralong Dam
2021	Brisbane Boys' College	Anglican Church Grammar	Gregory Terrace	6 min 05.78 sec	Wyaralong Dam
2022	Brisbane Boys' College	The Southport School	Nudgee College	5 min 38.46 sec	Wyaralong Dam
2023	Brisbane Boys' College	The Southport School	Brisbane Grammar	5 min 53.71 sec	Wyaralong Dam
2024	The Southport School	Brisbane Grammar	Nudgee College	5 min 45.40 sec	Wyaralong Dam
2025	The Southport School	Brisbane Grammar	Brisbane State High	5 min 54.53 sec	Wyaralong Dam
2026	The Southport School	Anglican Church Grammar	Brisbane Grammar	5 min 46.38 sec	Wyaralong Dam

- The race is run over a 2000-metre course.
- 1983 - The race was run but due to multiple protests the race was deemed a "No Race" by the Headmasters at the time.
- 2005 - The race was shortened to 1800 metres due to lack of water in Wivenhoe Dam.

School	Number of wins in Fours	Number of wins in Eights	Total	Last win
Brisbane Boys' College	11	16	27	2023
The Southport School	9	15	24	2026
Brisbane Grammar School	3	18	21	2020
Anglican Church Grammar School	6	10	16	2012
St Joseph's Nudgee College	0	9	9	2019
Brisbane State High School	5	0	5	1948
St Joseph's College Gregory Terrace	0	4	4	2008

=== Points Score – Old Boys' Cup ===
The Old Boys' Cup for overall points score was first presented in 1988.
In 1988 and 1989 the lowest number of points won.
The point score system currently being used was introduced in 1990 and amended in 2001 when Nudgee College competed for the first time. Only the 12 championship events count for points.
The Championship events are:

- Open 1st, 2nd, and 3rd Eights
- Year 11 1st, 2nd, and 3rd Eights
- Year 10 1st, 2nd, 3rd, 4th, 5th, and 6th Quad Sculls

Year	Champions	Points	2nd	Points	3rd	Points	4th	Points	5th	Points	6th	Points	7th	Points
1988	BGS		ACGS		BBC		TSS		GT		BSHS			
1989	TSS													
1990	ACGS	73	BBC	61	BGS	56	GT	50	BSHS	26				
1991	ACGS	101	TSS & BBC	75			GT	58	BGS	52	BSHS	27		
1992	BBC	90	ACGS	83	BGS	74	TSS	62	BSHS	42	GT	41		
1993	BBC	92	ACGS	87	BGS	83	GT	59	TSS	48	BSHS	21		
1994	BGS	95	GT	94	BBC	71	TSS	54	ACGS	51	BSHS	23		
1995	BGS	104	GT	100	BBC	63	ACGS	57	TSS	49	BSHS	17		
1996	BGS	106	GT	93	BBC	75	TSS	52	ACGS	49	BSHS	13		
1997	GT	100	BGS	98	BBC	59	ACGS & TSS (tie)	57			BSHS	15		
1998	BGS	91	ACGS	85	TSS	79	GT	60	BBC	58	BSHS	11		
1999	ACGS	93	BGS	83	BBC	72	GT	67	TSS	63	BSHS	6		
2000	TSS	89	BBC	87	BGS	76	ACGS	67	GT	54	BSHS	14		
2001	BBC	101	ACGS	98.5	BGS	97	GT	74	TSS	72.5	BSHS	25	NC	14
2002	BBC	108	ACGS	90	GT	88	BGS	83	TSS	66	BSHS	32	NC	21
2003	BBC	113	ACGS	104	GT	84	BGS	73	TSS	46	NC	37	BSHS	16
2004	ACGS	99	GT	95	BBC	85	BGS	76	TSS	55	BSHS	46	NC	7
2005	ACGS	106	BBC	88	GT	81	BGS	73	TSS	63	BSHS	53	NC	24
2006	ACGS	110	GT	91	BBC	81	BGS	78	TSS	63	NC	32	BSHS	27
2007	GT	106	ACGS	94	BBC	85	BGS	82	TSS	73	NC	31	BSHS	8
2008	GT	112	ACGS	88	BBC	85	TSS	66	BGS	63	NC	62	BSHS	13
2009	GT	104	BGS	87	NC	84	BBC	79	ACGS	74	TSS	35	BSHS	26
2010	Not awarded													
2011	NC	108	ACGS	94	TSS	92	GT	83	BGS	57	BBC	47	BSHS	9
2012	NC & TSS (tie)	98			ACGS	83	GT	76	BGS	62	BBC	58	BSHS	11
2013	TSS	107	NC	95	ACGS	92	GT	65	BGS	61	BBC	60	BSHS	9
2014	NC	107	TSS	97	ACGS	92	BBC	78	BGS	58	GT	46	BSHS	19
2015	NC	110	TSS	98	ACGS	87	GT	63	BGS	62	BBC	58	BSHS	13
2016	NC	108	ACGS	101	TSS	91	GT	72	BGS	57	BBC	52	BSHS	10
2017	NC	100	ACGS	92	TSS	91	GT	85	BBC	68	BGS	41	BSHS	11
2018	NC	104	ACGS	102	TSS	92	GT	77	BGS	55	BBC	52	BSHS	6
2019	ACGS	105	GT	98	TSS	90	NC	89	BGS	49	BBC	40	BSHS	5
2020	ACGS	110	NC	90	TSS	85	GT	77	BGS	61	BBC	55	BSHS	4
2021	ACGS	111	NC	86	TSS	85	GT	78	BBC	69	BGS	53	BSHS	5
2022	TSS	113	ACGS	86	BBC	83	NC	80	GT	65	BGS	47	BSHS	9
2023	TSS	112	BBC	105	GT	84	ACGS	68	BGS	65	NC	39	BSHS	7
2024	TSS	110	GT	102	BGS	86	ACGS	59	BBC	57	NC	40	BSHS	12
2025	TSS	116	BGS	96	GT	95	ACGS	66	BBC	49	NC	36	BSHS	11
2026	TSS	111	BGS	88	ACGS	85	GT	81	NC	60	BBC	53	BSHS	2

- In 2010, due to inclement weather, only the Open 1st, 2nd, and 3rd Eights were raced at Head of the River. Therefore, due to a lack of events, the Old Boys' Cup was not awarded.

School	Total	Last win
Brisbane Boys' College	5	2003
The Southport School	9	2026
Brisbane Grammar School	5	1998
Anglican Church Grammar School	9	2021
St Joseph's Nudgee College	7	2018
Brisbane State High School	0	
St Joseph's College Gregory Terrace	4	2009

=== Winning Head of the River Championship Events ===
Crew	Open 1st VIII	Open 2nd VIII	Open 3rd VIII	U16 1st VIII	U16 2nd VIII	U16 3rd VIII	U15 1st IV	U15 2nd IV	U15 3rd IV	U15 4th IV	U15 5th IV	U15 6th IV
1994	GT	BBC	GT	BGS	BGS	GT	BGS	BBC	BGS	BGS	GT	GT
1995	BGS	GT	GT	BGS	BGS	GT	GT	BGS	BGS	BGS	TSS	GT
1996	GT	BGS	BGS	GT	BBC	BGS	TSS	GT	BGS	BGS	BGS	BGS
1997	BGS	GT	GT	BGS	GT	BGS	ACGS	TSS	BGS	GT	BGS	ACGS
1998	ACGS	TSS	BGS	BGS	ACGS	BGS	ACGS	TSS	BGS	TSS	TSS	TSS
1999	BGS	GT	ACGS	ACGS	ACGS	BBC	ACGS	BGS	BGS	BGS	BGS	BBC
2000	TSS	TSS	TSS	TSS	BBC	BBC	BBC	ACGS	BGS	BGS	BGS	ACGS
2001	BGS	GT	GT	BBC	BGS	ACGS	BBC	ACGS	BBC	BBC	BGS	BBC
2002	BBS	BBC	BGS	BBC	BBC	BBC	ACGS	GT	GT	GT	ACGS	GT

Crew	Open 1st VIII	Open 2nd VIII	Open 3rd VIII	U16 1st VIII	U16 2nd VIII	U16 3rd VIII	U15 1st Quad	U15 2nd Quad	U15 3rd Quad	U15 4th Quad	U15 5th Quad	U15 6th Quad
2003	NC	ACGS	BBC	ACGS	BBC	BBC	ACGS	ACGS	BBC	GT	BBC	GT
2004	ACGS	TSS	BBC	BSHS	GT	GT	ACGS	BGS	BSHS	ACGS	ACGS	ACGS
2005	ACGS	ACGS	GT	ACGS	GT	ACGS	BGS	BSHS	ACGS	BGS	BBC	BSHS
2006	TSS	ACGS	ACGS	GT	GT	ACGS	GT	GT	BBC	BGS	ACGS	BBC
2007	BGS	ACGS	GT	GT	GT	ACGS	BGS	GT	BBC	BGS	GT	BGS
2008	GT	ACGS	ACGS	TSS	GT	BBC	BBC	BGS	GT	BBC	BGS	BGS

Crew	Open 1st VIII	Open 2nd VIII	Open 3rd VIII	Year 11 1st VIII	Year 11 2nd VIII	Year 11 3rd VIII	Year 10 1st Quad	Year 10 2nd Quad	Year 10 3rd Quad	Year 10 4th Quad	Year 10 5th Quad	Year 10 6th Quad
2009	NC	NC	BBC	GT	ACGS	Gt	GT	GT	GT	NC	GT	BSHS
2010	ACGS	ACGS	GT	No race	No race	No race	No race	No race	No race	No race	No race	No race
2011	NC	ACGS	TSS	NC	NC	NC	NC	TSS	NC	TSS	TSS	TSS
2012	ACGS	ACGS	NC	NC	TSS	TSS	BBC	NC	BBC	NC	NC	TSS
2013	NC	TSS	TSS	TSS	ACGS	NC	TSS	BGS	TSS	TSS	TSS	BBC
2014	NC	TSS	NC	NC	BBC	NC	BBC	TSS	BBC	TSS	NC	ACGS
2015	NC	TSS	NC	BGS	TSS	TSS	BBC	NC	NC	NC	ACGS	NC
2016	NC	NC	NC	TSS	TSS	ACGS	ACGS	ACGS	ACGS	NC	NC	NC
2017	NC	NC	ACGS	ACGS	BGS	GT	BBC	NC	NC	ACGS	ACGS	ACGS
2018	NC	NC	NC	ACGS	ACGS	ACGS	BGS	GT	NC	TSS	GT	TSS
2019	NC	NC	ACGS	GT	ACGS	ACGS	ACGS	GT	TSS	TSS	ACGS	ACGS
2020	BGS	GT	ACGS	TSS	ACGS	ACGS	BBC	BBC	BBC	ACGS	ACGS	ACGS
2021	BBC	NC	ACGS	TSS	TSS	ACGS	ACGS	BBC	GT	NC	ACGS	ACGS
2022	BBC	TSS	TSS	BBC	BBC	ACGS	TSS	GT	ACGS	GT	TSS	ACGS
2023	BBC	BBC	TSS	GT	GT	TSS	GT	TSS	TSS	TSS	TSS	TSS
2024	TSS	TSS	GT	TSS	TSS	GT	BGS	BGS	ACGS	ACGS	GT	TSS
2025	TSS	TSS	GT	BGS	TSS	TSS	TSS	TSS	BGS	GT	TSS	TSS
2026	TSS	TSS	TSS	BGS	BGS	BGS	BBC	GT	TSS	TSS	TSS	TSS

- The Eights race over 2000 metres and the Quads race over 1500 metres.
- Prior to 2003, the Under 15 age group raced in Fours.
- Since 2009, crews have raced by year group, rather than age group.

=== Head of the River Championship Events – Results ===
2007

Crew	1st	2nd	3rd	4th	5th	6th	7th
U15 6th Quad	BGS	BBC	ACGS	GT	TSS		
U15 5th Quad	GT	ACGS	BBC	TSS	BGS		
U15 4th Quad	BGS	GT	ACGS	BBC	TSS		
U15 3rd Quad	BBC	BGS	GT	TSS	ACGS	BSHS	NC
U15 2nd Quad	GT	BGS	TSS	BBC	ACGS	NC	BSHS
U15 1st Quad	BGS	TSS	GT	ACGS	BBC	NC	BSHS
U16 3rd VIII	ACGS	BBC	GT	TSS	BGS		
U16 2nd VIII	GT	ACGS	BGS	BBC	TSS	NC	
U16 1st VIII	GT	ACGS	TSS	BBC	BGS	NC	
Open 3rd VIII	GT	ACGS	BBC	TSS	BGS		
Open 2nd VIII	ACGS	NC	BBC	GT	TSS	BGS	BSHS
Open 1st VIII	BGS	GT	TSS	BBC	NC	ACGS	BSHS

2008

Crew	1st	2nd	3rd	4th	5th	6th	7th
U15 6th Quad	BGS	NC	GT	BBC	TSS	ACGS	
U15 5th Quad	BGS	TSS	BBC	NC	GT	ACGS	
U15 4th Quad	BBC	BGS	GT	BSHS	ACGS	NC	TSS
U15 3rd Quad	GT	NC	BBC	ACGS	BGS	TSS	BSHS
U15 2nd Quad	BGS	ACGS	NC	GT	BBC	BSHS	TSS
U15 1st Quad	BBC	ACGS	NC	GT	TSS	BSHS	BGS
U16 3rd VIII	BBC	GT	ACGS	TSS			
U16 2nd VIII	GT	BBC	TSS	ACGS	BGS		
U16 1st VIII	TSS	GT	NC	ACGS	BGS	BBC	BSHS
Open 3rd VIII	ACGS	BBC	BGS	GT	NC		
Open 2nd VIII	ACGS	TSS	GT	NC	BGS	BBC	
Open 1st VIII	GT	ACGS	NC	BBC	TSS	BGS	BSHS

2009

Crew	1st	2nd	3rd	4th	5th	6th	7th
Year 10 6th Quad	BSHS	GT	NC	ACGS	BBC	BGS	
Year 10 5th Quad	GT	BGS	BBC	NC	BSHS	ACGS	TSS
Year 10 4th Quad	NC	GT	BBC	BGS	ACGS	TSS	BSHS
Year 10 3rd Quad	GT	NC	BGS	ACGS	BBC	TSS	BSHS
Year 10 2nd Quad	GT	NC	BGS	BBC	ACGS	TSS	BSHS
Year 10 1st Quad	GT	TSS	BBC	NC	BGS	ACGS	BSHS
Year 11 3rd VIII	GT	BGS	ACGS	BBC	NC		
Year 11 2nd VIII	ACGS	BGS	BBC	GT	TSS	NC	BSHS
Year 11 1st VIII	GT	BGS	TSS	ACGS	NC	BSHS	BBC
Open 3rd VIII	BBC	ACGS	GT	NC	BGS		
Open 2nd VIII	NC	BBC	BGS	ACGS	GT	BSHS	
Open 1st VIII	NC	GT	BGS	BBC	TSS	ACGS	BSHS

2010

Crew	1st	2nd	3rd	4th	5th	6th	7th
Open 3rd VIII	GT	NC	ACGS	BGS	TSS		
Open 2nd VIII	ACGS	NC	TSS	GT	BGS	BBC	BSHS
Open 1st VIII	ACGS	TSS	NC	GT	BGS	BBC	BSHS

2011

Crew	1st	2nd	3rd	4th	5th	6th	7th
Year 10 6th Quad	TSS	BBC	GT	NC	ACGS	BGS	
Year 10 5th Quad	TSS	ACGS	GT	NC	BBC	BGS	
Year 10 4th Quad	TSS	NC	BBC	GT	ACGS	BGS	BSHS
Year 10 3rd Quad	NC	TSS	ACGS	GT	BBC	BSHS	BGS
Year 10 2nd Quad	TSS	NC	GT	ACGS	BBC	BGS	BSHS
Year 10 1st Quad	NC	TSS	ACGS	BGS	BBC	GT	BSHS
Year 11 3rd VIII	NC	BGS	ACGS	GT	TSS		
Year 11 2nd VIII	NC	ACGS	BGS	TSS	GT	BBC	
Year 11 1st VIII	NC	ACGS	GT	TSS	BGS	BBC	
Open 3rd VIII	TSS	GT	NC	ACGS	BBC	BGS	
Open 2nd VIII	ACGS	GT	TSS	NC	BBC	BGS	BSHS
Open 1st VIII	NC	ACGS	GT	BGS	TSS	BBC	BSHS

2012

Crew	1st	2nd	3rd	4th	5th	6th	7th
Year 10 6th Quad	TSS	GT	NC	BBC	BGS	ACGS	
Year 10 5th Quad	NC	BBC	TSS	BGS	GT	ACGS	
Year 10 4th Quad	NC	BBC	TSS	GT	ACGS	BGS	BSHS
Year 10 3rd Quad	BBC	TSS	GT	BGS	NC	ACGS	BSHS
Year 10 2nd Quad	NC	BBC	GT	TSS	BGS	ACGS	BSHS
Year 10 1st Quad	BBC	ACGS	NC	BSHS	GT	BGS	TSS
Year 11 3rd VIII	TSS	ACGS	GT	NC	BGS		
Year 11 2nd VIII	TSS	NC	GT	BGS	ACGS	BBC	
Year 11 1st VIII	NC	ACGS	TSS	GT	BBC	BGS	
Open 3rd VIII	NC	BGS	TSS	ACGS	GT		
Open 2nd VIII	ACGS	TSS	GT	BBC	BGS	NC	BSHS
Open 1st VIII	ACGS	NC	TSS	BGS	GT	BBC	BSHS

2013
BSHS placed 7th in the Year 11 2nd VIII event, but were not eligible for placing or points.

Due to a protest, the Year 11 1st VIII event was re-raced.

Crew	1st	2nd	3rd	4th	5th	6th	7th
Year 10 6th Quad	BBC	GT	ACGS	NC	TSS	BGS	
Year 10 5th Quad	TSS	NC	BBC	ACGS	GT	BGS	BSHS
Year 10 4th Quad	TSS	ACGS	BGS	BBC	BSHS	GT	NC
Year 10 3rd Quad	TSS	NC	BBC	ACGS	BGS	GT	BSHS
Year 10 2nd Quad	BGS	NC	GT	ACGS	BBC	TSS	BSHS
Year 10 1st Quad	TSS	NC	ACGS	BGS	GT	BBC	BSHS
Year 11 3rd VIII	NC	TSS	ACGS	GT	BGS		
Year 11 2nd VIII	ACGS	NC	TSS	BBC	GT	BGS	
Year 11 1st VIII	TSS	ACGS	BBC	BGS	NC	GT	
Open 3rd VIII	TSS	GT	BGS	NC	ACGS	BBC	
Open 2nd VIII	TSS	NC	ACGS	GT	BGS	BBC	
Open 1st VIII	NC	ACGS	TSS	BBC	GT	BGS	BSHS

== B.S.R.A. Head of the River ==
=== Participating Schools ===
School	Location	Enrolment	Founded	Denomination	Day/Boarding	School Colours	Abbreviation	In competition since
All Hallows' School	Brisbane	1,300	1861	Catholic	Day	Light Blue & White	AHS	1990
Brisbane Girls' Grammar School	Spring Hill	1,150	1875	Non-Denominational	Day	Royal Blue	BGGS	1991
Brisbane State High School	South Brisbane	3,361	1921	Non-Denominational	Day	Sangria & Navy Blue	BSHS	1990
Lourdes Hill College	Hawthorne	850	1916	Catholic	Day & Boarding	Silver, Purple & White	LHC	2000
St Aidan's Anglican Girls' School	Corinda	800	1929	Anglican	Day	Navy Blue, White & Brown	STA	1990-2021
St Hilda's School	Southport	750	1912	Anglican	Day & Boarding	Red, Yellow & Blue	STH	1990
St Margaret's Anglican Girls' School	Ascot	900	1895	Anglican	Day & Boarding	Navy Blue, White & Brown	STM	1990
St Peter's Lutheran College	Indooroopilly	2,000	1945	Lutheran	Day & Boarding	Maroon & White	SPLC	1990
Stuartholme School	Toowong	700	1920	Catholic	Day & Boarding	Red, Gold & Blue	STU	1991
Somerville House	South Brisbane	1,200	1899	Uniting Church	Day & Boarding	Navy Blue, Bottle Green & White	SOM	1990

- St Aidan's Anglican Girls' School stopped competing in the BSRA after the 2021 competition

=== Open 1st VIII – Brisbane Schoolgirls' Rowing Association Cup ===
1990 was the inaugural Schoolgirls' Head Of The River. The race was run over 1500 metres from 1990 until 1993, and over 2000 metres since 1994.

Year	Champions	2nd	3rd	Winning Time	Venue
1990	Somerville	St Margaret's	State High		Milton Reach, Brisbane River
1991	Somerville	State High	St Margaret's		Milton Reach, Brisbane River
1992	State High	Somerville	All Hallows		Milton Reach, Brisbane River
1993	State High	Girls Grammar	Somerville		Milton Reach, Brisbane River
1994	Somerville	State High	All Hallows		Wivenhoe Dam
1995	Somerville	St Margaret's	State High		Hinze Dam
1996	All Hallows	Somerville	State High		Wivenhoe Dam
1997	St Margaret's	All Hallows	Somerville		Wivenhoe Dam
1998	Stuartholme	St Margaret's	Somerville		Wivenhoe Dam
1999	St Margaret's	Somerville	St Aidan's	6 min 58.4 sec	Wivenhoe Dam
2000	All Hallows	St Margaret's	St Aidan's	7 min 19.0 sec	Wivenhoe Dam
2001	St Margaret's	All Hallow	Stuartholme	6 min 45.5 sec	Wivenhoe Dam
2002	St Margaret's	Stuartholme	Somerville	6 min 54.0 sec	Wivenhoe Dam
2003	Somerville	St Margaret's	All Hallows	6 min 56.0 sec	Wivenhoe Dam
2004	St Aidan's	St Margaret's	All Hallows	6 min 49.0 sec	Wivenhoe Dam
2005	St Margaret's	St Aidan's	Somerville	7 min 39.0 sec	Hinze Dam
2006	Somerville	St Margaret's	Girls Grammar	6 min 50.0 sec	Hinze Dam
2007	St Margaret's	St Peter's	Somerville	6 min 51.0 sec	Hinze Dam
2008	St Peter's	St Margaret's	St Aidan's	7 min 47.0 sec	Lake Kawana
2009	St Margaret's	St Peter's	Girls Grammar	8 min 7.86 sec	Lake Kawana
2010	St Peter's	Somerville	St Aidan's	6 min 36.41 sec	Lake Kawana
2011	St Margaret's	St Aidan's	Somerville	7 min 39.9 sec	Lake Kawana
2012	St Margaret's	St Aidan's	St Peter's	6 min 52.11 sec	Lake Kawana
2013	St Margaret's	Somerville	St Aidan's	6 min 52.77 sec	Lake Kawana
2014	St Margaret's	Somerville	Grils Grammar	6 min 41 sec	Lake Kawana
2015	St Margaret's	Somerville	St Hilda's	6 min 42.7 sec	Lake Kawana
2016	St Margaret's	St Hilda's	Somerville	6 min 46.81 sec	Lake Kawana
2017	St Hilda's	Somerville	St Margaret's	6 min 17.64 sec	Wyaralong Dam
2018	Stuartholme	Somerville	St Margaret's	6 min 33.94 sec	Wyaralong Dam
2019	St Margaret's	Stuartholme	All Hallows	6 min 50.77 sec	Wyaralong Dam
2020	Girls Grammar	St Hilda's	Somerville	6 min 50.40 sec	Wyaralong Dam
2021	St Margaret's	St Hilda's	All Hallows	7 min 10.69 sec	Wyaralong Dam
2022	St Margaret's	St Hilda's	All Hallows	6 min 37.63 sec	Wyaralong Dam
2023	All Hallows'	St Margaret's	St Hilda's	6 min 48.57 sec	Wyaralong Dam
2024	All Hallows'	St Margaret's	Girls Grammar	6 min 37.57 sec	Wyaralong Dam
2025	All Hallows'	St Margaret's	Girls Grammar	6 min 35.63 sec	Wyaralong Dam

School	Number of wins
St Margaret's Anglican Girls' School	16
Somerville House	6
All Hallows School	5
Brisbane State High School	2
St Peter's Lutheran College	2
Stuartholme School	2
St Aidan's Anglican Girls' School	1
Brisbane Girls Grammar School	1
St Hilda's School	1
Lourdes Hill College	0

=== Points Score – Aggregate Cup ===
The Aggregate Cup for overall points score was first awarded in 1995 to the most successful school. Only the 21 Championship events count for points.
The Championship events are:

- Open 1st Eight
- Senior 2nd, and 3rd Eights
- Senior Four
- Year 10 1st, 2nd, 3rd, and 4th Quad Sculls
- Year 9 1st, 2nd, 3rd, and 4th Quad Sculls
- Year 8 1st, 2nd, 3rd, and 4th Quad Sculls

- Year 12 Single Scull
- Year 11 Single Scull
- Year 10 Single Scull
- Year 9 Single Scull
- Year 8 Single Scull

Year	Winning School
1995	Somerville
1996	St Margaret's
1997	St Margaret's
1998	Somerville
1999	St Margaret's
2000	Not awarded
2001	St Margaret's
2002	St Margaret's
2003	Somerville
2004	Somerville
2005	St Aidan's
2006	Girls Grammar
2007	St Aidan's
2008	St Aidan's
2009	Somerville
2010	Somerville
2011	Somerville
2012	Somerville
2013	Somerville
2014	Somerville
2015	St Margaret's
2016	St Margaret's
2017	St Margaret's
2018	St Margaret's
2019	St Hilda's
2020	St Margaret's
2021	St Margaret's
2022	All Hallows & St Hilda's (tie)
2023	St Hilda's
2024	All Hallows'
2025	All Hallows'

- In 2000, due to inclement weather, all Single Scull events were cancelled. Therefore, due to lack of events, the Aggregate Cup was not awarded.

=== Winning Head of the River Championship Events ===
Senior Age Groups

Crew	Open 1st VIII	Open 2nd VIII	Open 1st IV	Open 2nd IV	Open Single Scull	Year 11 1st IV	Year 11 2nd IV	Year 11 3rd IV	Year 11 4th IV	Year 11 Single Scull
1999	STM	STM	SOM	SOM	BSHS	SOM	STM	SOM	SOM	SPLC
2000	AHS	STM	SOM	STM	No race	STM	SOM	SOM	STM	No race
2001	STM	SOM	STM	SOM	STM	SOM	STM	STA	STM	BSHS

Crew	Open 1st VIII	Open 2nd VIII	Open 3rd VIII	Open IV	Open Single Scull	Year 11 Single Scull
2002	STM	SOM	STM	STM	STM	BSHS
2003	SOM	SOM	SOM	STM	STM	STM
2004	STA	SOM	STM	LHC	STM	SPLC
2005	STM	SOM	SOM	BSHS	STU	SOM
2006	SOM	STA	STA	BSHS	STU	SPLC
2007	STM	STA	STA	STH	SPLC	SPLC
2008	SPLC	STA	BGGS	STH	SPLC	STM

Crew	Open 1st VIII	Senior 2nd VIII	Senior 3rd VIII	Senior IV	Year 12 Single Scull	Year 11 Single Scull
2009	STM	STA	STA	SOM	STM	SPLC
2010	SPLC	SOM	SOM	STH	SPLC	SPLC
2011	STM	STU	STU	STA	STM	SPLC
2012	STM	SOM	SOM	STH	SPLC	BGGS
2013	STM	SOM	STM	STM	BSHS	SPLC
2014	STM	SOM	STM	BGGS	BGGS	SOM
2015	STM	STM	STM	SPLC	SOM	STM
2016	STM	STM	STM	STU	No race	No race
2017	STM	STM	AHS	SPLC	SPLC	STU
2018	STU	STM	STM	LHC	SOM	STM
2019	STM	STM	STM	LHC	STU	STH
2020	BGGS	BGGS	AHS	STM	STM	BGGS
2021	STM	SOM	STM	STU	STM	SPLC
2022	STM	BGGS	STH	SPLC	SOM	STM
2023	AHS	STM	STH	SPLC	STM	BGGS
2024	AHS	STH	AHS	STM	BGGS	LHC
2025	AHS	STM	BGGS	BSHS	STM	SPLC

- The Senior Eights race over 2000 metres, the Senior Four races over 1500 metres, and the Single Sculls race over 1000 metres.
- Prior to 2002, the Senior age group was split into Year 11 and Open. The Year 11s raced in Fours and the Opens raced in both Fours and Eights.
- In 2009, the Open Single Scull, Open 2nd VIII, Open 3rd VIII, and Open IV were renamed to the Year 12 Single Scull, Senior 2nd VIII, Senior 3rd VIII, and Senior IV respectively.

Junior Age Groups

Crew	Year 10 1st Quad	Year 10 2nd Quad	Year 10 3rd Quad	Year 10 4th Quad	Year 10 Single Scull	Year 9 1st Quad	Year 9 2nd Quad	Year 9 3rd Quad	Year 9 4th Quad	Year 9 Single Scull	Year 8 1st Quad	Year 8 2nd Quad	Year 8 3rd Quad	Year 8 4th Quad	Year 8 Single Scull
1999	STM	STM	STM	SOM	STM	BSHS	STH	STM	STM	SOM	STM	STM	STU	STU	STM
2000	BSHS	SOM	STM	STM	No race	STM	STM	STM	STU	No race	STM	SOM	STM	STM	No race
2001	SOM	STM	STM	STU	STM	SOM	STM	STM	SOM	STM	STM	STM	STA	STU	STM
2002	STA	STM	SOM	SOM	LHC	STM	STA	STA	STU	STM	SOM	SOM	SOM	STA	SOM
2003	STM	SOM	SOM	STM	STM	STM	SOM	SOM	SOM	SOM	SOM	STU	STM	SOM	SPLC
2004	SOM	SOM	STM	SOM	SOM	STN	SOM	STA	STA	SPLC	SOM	STA	SOM	STA	SOM
2005	SOM	STM	STA	STA	SPLC	BGGS	STU	STM	SOM	STA	BGGS	SPLC	BGGS	STA	STM
2006	SPLC	STM	BGGS	BGGS	SPLC	STM	BGGS	STA	BGGS	STM	SOM	SOM	STA	BGGS	STH
2007	STM	BGGS	STA	STA	STM	BGGS	BGGS	STM	BGGS	STH	STA	AHS	STU	BGGS	AHS
2008	STH	STM	SPLC	SOM	SPLC	STA	STU	STU	STU	AHS	SOM	SOM	SOM	SOM	STH
2009	STA	STM	STU	SOM	SOM	STA	SOM	SOM	SOM	SOM	STA	AHS	STU	STU	SOM
2010	SOM	SOM	SOM	SOM	SOM	BGGS	AHS	SOM	SOM	SOM	STM	SOM	STM	STM	STM
2011	SOM	SOM	AHS	SOM	SPLC	STM	STM	STM	STM	STM	SOM	STH	STM	SOM	SPLC
2012	SOM	SOM	STM	AHS	SOM	SOM	SOM	STH	SPLC	SPLC	STM	SPLC	STU	STM	STM
2013	AHS	SOM	STH	SPLC	SPLC	SOM	STM	STH	STH	SPLC	STM	SOM	SOM	SOM	STM
2014	STH	STH	STH	SOM	STM	SPLC	SOM	SOM	SOM	SPLC	STM	STM	STH	STH	STU
2015	STM	SOM	STM	STM	SPLC	STM	SOM	BGGS	STM	SOM	STU	BGGS	STU	STU	BGGS
2016	SOM	STU	STU	STM	No race	STU	STU	STU	STU	No race	STM	STM	STM	SOM	No race
2017	STU	STM	STU	STU	BGGS	AHS	SOM	STU	STM	AHS	STM	STM	SOM	STM	BGGS
2018															
2019															
2020															
2021															
2022															
2023	BSHS	STH	BSHS	STH	LHC	STH	STM	STM	STH	SPLC	AHS	AHS	STM	BSHS	AHS
2024	BGGS	AHS	STM	SOM	BGGS	AHS	AHS	SOM	AHS	LHC	STH	AHS	STU	AHS	SPLC
2025	SOM	STU	STU	STU	AHS	STH	AHS	AHS	STM	SOM	STM	SOM	SOM	STM	AHS

- The Year 10 Quads race over 1500 metres, and the Year 9 Quads, the Year 8 Quads, and the Single Sculls race over 1000 metres.

=== Head of the River Championship Events – Results ===
1999

Crew	1st	2nd	3rd	4th	5th	6th	7th	8th	9th
Year 8 Single Scull									
Year 8 4th Quad									
Year 8 3rd Quad									
Year 8 2nd Quad									
Year 8 1st Quad									
Year 9 Single Scull									
Year 9 4th Quad									
Year 9 3rd Quad									
Year 9 2nd Quad									
Year 9 1st Quad									
Year 10 Single Scull									
Year 10 4th Quad									
Year 10 3rd Quad									
Year 10 2nd Quad									
Year 10 1st Quad									
Year 11 Single Scull									
Year 11 4th IV									
Year 11 3rd IV									
Year 11 2nd IV									
Year 11 1st IV									
Open Single Scull									
Open 2nd IV									
Open 1st IV									
Open 2nd VIII									
Open 1st VIII									

2000

Crew	1st	2nd	3rd	4th	5th	6th	7th	8th	9th	10th
Year 8 Single Scull										
Year 8 4th Quad										
Year 8 3rd Quad										
Year 8 2nd Quad										
Year 8 1st Quad										
Year 9 Single Scull										
Year 9 4th Quad										
Year 9 3rd Quad										
Year 9 2nd Quad										
Year 9 1st Quad										
Year 10 Single Scull										
Year 10 4th Quad										
Year 10 3rd Quad										
Year 10 2nd Quad										
Year 10 1st Quad										
Year 11 Single Scull										
Year 11 4th IV										
Year 11 3rd IV										
Year 11 2nd IV										
Year 11 1st IV										
Open Single Scull										
Open 2nd IV										
Open 1st IV										
Open 2nd VIII										
Open 1st VIII										

2001

Crew	1st	2nd	3rd	4th	5th	6th	7th	8th	9th	10th
Year 8 Single Scull										
Year 8 4th Quad										
Year 8 3rd Quad										
Year 8 2nd Quad										
Year 8 1st Quad										
Year 9 Single Scull										
Year 9 4th Quad										
Year 9 3rd Quad										
Year 9 2nd Quad										
Year 9 1st Quad										
Year 10 Single Scull										
Year 10 4th Quad										
Year 10 3rd Quad										
Year 10 2nd Quad										
Year 10 1st Quad										
Year 11 Single Scull										
Year 11 4th IV										
Year 11 3rd IV										
Year 11 2nd IV										
Year 11 1st IV										
Open Single Scull										
Open 2nd IV										
Open 1st IV										
Open 2nd VIII										
Open 1st VIII										

2002

Crew	1st	2nd	3rd	4th	5th	6th	7th	8th	9th	10th
Year 8 Single Scull										
Year 8 4th Quad										
Year 8 3rd Quad										
Year 8 2nd Quad										
Year 8 1st Quad										
Year 9 Single Scull										
Year 9 4th Quad										
Year 9 3rd Quad										
Year 9 2nd Quad										
Year 9 1st Quad										
Year 10 Single Scull										
Year 10 4th Quad										
Year 10 3rd Quad										
Year 10 2nd Quad										
Year 10 1st Quad										
Year 11 Single Scull										
Open Single Scull										
Open IV										
Open 3rd VIII										
Open 2nd VIII										
Open 1st VIII										

2003

Crew	1st	2nd	3rd	4th	5th	6th	7th	8th	9th	10th
Year 8 Single Scull										
Year 8 4th Quad										
Year 8 3rd Quad										
Year 8 2nd Quad										
Year 8 1st Quad										
Year 9 Single Scull										
Year 9 4th Quad										
Year 9 3rd Quad										
Year 9 2nd Quad										
Year 9 1st Quad										
Year 10 Single Scull										
Year 10 4th Quad										
Year 10 3rd Quad										
Year 10 2nd Quad										
Year 10 1st Quad										
Year 11 Single Scull										
Open Single Scull										
Open IV										
Open 3rd VIII										
Open 2nd VIII										
Open 1st VIII										

2004

Crew	1st	2nd	3rd	4th	5th	6th	7th	8th	9th	10th
Year 8 Single Scull										
Year 8 4th Quad										
Year 8 3rd Quad										
Year 8 2nd Quad										
Year 8 1st Quad										
Year 9 Single Scull										
Year 9 4th Quad										
Year 9 3rd Quad										
Year 9 2nd Quad										
Year 9 1st Quad										
Year 10 Single Scull										
Year 10 4th Quad										
Year 10 3rd Quad										
Year 10 2nd Quad										
Year 10 1st Quad										
Year 11 Single Scull										
Open Single Scull										
Open IV										
Open 3rd VIII										
Open 2nd VIII										
Open 1st VIII										

2005

Crew	1st	2nd	3rd	4th	5th	6th	7th	8th	9th	10th
Year 8 Single Scull										
Year 8 4th Quad										
Year 8 3rd Quad										
Year 8 2nd Quad										
Year 8 1st Quad										
Year 9 Single Scull										
Year 9 4th Quad										
Year 9 3rd Quad										
Year 9 2nd Quad										
Year 9 1st Quad										
Year 10 Single Scull										
Year 10 4th Quad										
Year 10 3rd Quad										
Year 10 2nd Quad										
Year 10 1st Quad										
Year 11 Single Scull										
Open Single Scull										
Open IV										
Open 3rd VIII										
Open 2nd VIII										
Open 1st VIII										

2006

Crew	1st	2nd	3rd	4th	5th	6th	7th	8th	9th	10th
Year 8 Single Scull										
Year 8 4th Quad										
Year 8 3rd Quad										
Year 8 2nd Quad										
Year 8 1st Quad										
Year 9 Single Scull										
Year 9 4th Quad										
Year 9 3rd Quad										
Year 9 2nd Quad										
Year 9 1st Quad										
Year 10 Single Scull										
Year 10 4th Quad										
Year 10 3rd Quad										
Year 10 2nd Quad										
Year 10 1st Quad										
Year 11 Single Scull										
Open Single Scull										
Open IV										
Open 3rd VIII										
Open 2nd VIII										
Open 1st VIII										

2007

Crew	1st	2nd	3rd	4th	5th	6th	7th	8th	9th	10th
Year 8 Single Scull										
Year 8 4th Quad										
Year 8 3rd Quad										
Year 8 2nd Quad										
Year 8 1st Quad										
Year 9 Single Scull										
Year 9 4th Quad										
Year 9 3rd Quad										
Year 9 2nd Quad										
Year 9 1st Quad										
Year 10 Single Scull										
Year 10 4th Quad										
Year 10 3rd Quad										
Year 10 2nd Quad										
Year 10 1st Quad										
Year 11 Single Scull										
Open Single Scull										
Open IV										
Open 3rd VIII										
Open 2nd VIII										
Open 1st VIII										

2008

Crew	1st	2nd	3rd	4th	5th	6th	7th	8th	9th	10th
Year 8 Single Scull										
Year 8 4th Quad										
Year 8 3rd Quad										
Year 8 2nd Quad										
Year 8 1st Quad										
Year 9 Single Scull										
Year 9 4th Quad										
Year 9 3rd Quad										
Year 9 2nd Quad										
Year 9 1st Quad										
Year 10 Single Scull										
Year 10 4th Quad										
Year 10 3rd Quad										
Year 10 2nd Quad										
Year 10 1st Quad										
Year 11 Single Scull										
Open Single Scull										
Open IV										
Open 3rd VIII										
Open 2nd VIII										
Open 1st VIII										

2009

Crew	1st	2nd	3rd	4th	5th	6th	7th	8th	9th	10th
Year 8 Single Scull										
Year 8 4th Quad										
Year 8 3rd Quad										
Year 8 2nd Quad										
Year 8 1st Quad										
Year 9 Single Scull										
Year 9 4th Quad										
Year 9 3rd Quad										
Year 9 2nd Quad										
Year 9 1st Quad										
Year 10 Single Scull										
Year 10 4th Quad										
Year 10 3rd Quad										
Year 10 2nd Quad										
Year 10 1st Quad										
Year 11 Single Scull										
Year 12 Single Scull										
Senior IV										
Senior 3rd VIII										
Senior 2nd VIII										
Open 1st VIII										

2010

Crew	1st	2nd	3rd	4th	5th	6th	7th	8th	9th	10th
Year 8 Single Scull										
Year 8 4th Quad										
Year 8 3rd Quad										
Year 8 2nd Quad										
Year 8 1st Quad										
Year 9 Single Scull										
Year 9 4th Quad										
Year 9 3rd Quad										
Year 9 2nd Quad										
Year 9 1st Quad										
Year 10 Single Scull										
Year 10 4th Quad										
Year 10 3rd Quad										
Year 10 2nd Quad										
Year 10 1st Quad										
Year 11 Single Scull										
Year 12 Single Scull										
Senior IV										
Senior 3rd VIII										
Senior 2nd VIII										
Open 1st VIII										

2011

Crew	1st	2nd	3rd	4th	5th	6th	7th	8th	9th	10th
Year 8 Single Scull										
Year 8 4th Quad										
Year 8 3rd Quad										
Year 8 2nd Quad										
Year 8 1st Quad										
Year 9 Single Scull										
Year 9 4th Quad										
Year 9 3rd Quad										
Year 9 2nd Quad										
Year 9 1st Quad										
Year 10 Single Scull										
Year 10 4th Quad										
Year 10 3rd Quad										
Year 10 2nd Quad										
Year 10 1st Quad										
Year 11 Single Scull										
Year 12 Single Scull										
Senior IV										
Senior 3rd VIII										
Senior 2nd VIII										
Open 1st VIII										

2012

Crew	1st	2nd	3rd	4th	5th	6th	7th	8th	9th	10th
Year 8 Single Scull										
Year 8 4th Quad										
Year 8 3rd Quad										
Year 8 2nd Quad										
Year 8 1st Quad										
Year 9 Single Scull										
Year 9 4th Quad										
Year 9 3rd Quad										
Year 9 2nd Quad										
Year 9 1st Quad										
Year 10 Single Scull										
Year 10 4th Quad										
Year 10 3rd Quad										
Year 10 2nd Quad										
Year 10 1st Quad										
Year 11 Single Scull										
Year 12 Single Scull										
Senior IV										
Senior 3rd VIII										
Senior 2nd VIII										
Open 1st VIII										

2013

Crew	1st	2nd	3rd	4th	5th	6th	7th	8th	9th	10th
Year 8 Single Scull	SPLC	STM	BGGS	SOM	STH	AHS	LHC	BSHS	STA	STU
Year 8 4th Quad	SOM	STH	STU	LHC	BGGS	AHS	STM	BSHS	SPLC	
Year 8 3rd Quad	SOM	BGGS	STM	AHS	BSHS	STA	STH	STU	LHC	SPLC
Year 8 2nd Quad	SOM	STH	BGGS	AHS	LHC	BSHS	STM	SPLC	STU	STA
Year 8 1st Quad	STM	SOM	SPLC	AHS	STH	BGGS	BSHS	STU	STA	LHC
Year 9 Single Scull	SPLC	SOM	STM	STH	BSHS	LHC	BGGS	AHS	STU	STA
Year 9 4th Quad	STH	STM	SOM	SPLC	BGGS	AHS	STU	LHC	BSHS	
Year 9 3rd Quad	STH	STM	SPLC	SOM	AHS	LHC	STU	BSHS	BGGS	STA
Year 9 2nd Quad	STM	STH	SOM	AHS	BGGS	STU	STA	SPLC	LHC	BSHS
Year 9 1st Quad	SOM	BGGS	STM	BSHS	SPLC	STA	STH	STU	AHS	LHC
Year 10 Single Scull	SPLC	STH	SOM	STU	BGGS	AHS	BSHS	STA	LHC	STM
Year 10 4th Quad	SPLC	AHS	STH	BGGS	STM	STU	SOM			
Year 10 3rd Quad	STH	AHS	STM	SPLC	STU	BSHS	SOM	LHC	BGGS	STA
Year 10 2nd Quad	SOM	AHS	SPLC	STM	STH	STU	STA	BGGS	LHC	BSHS
Year 10 1st Quad	AHS	SPLC	BGGS	STU	SOM	STM	STH	STU	LHC	STA
Year 11 Single Scull	SPLC	SOM	BGGS	BSHS	LHC	STA	STM	AHS	STU	STH
Year 12 Single Scull	BSHS	AHS	STA	SOM	BGGS	SPLC	STM	STH	STU	LHC
Senior IV	STM	STU	SOM	AHS	BGGS	STA				
Senior 3rd VIII	STM	SOM	STU	AHS	BGGS					
Senior 2nd VIII	SOM	STA	STM	AHS	STH	LHC	STU	BGGS	SPLC	
Open 1st VIII	STM	SOM	STA	AHS	STH	BGGS	LHC	SPLC	BSHS	STU

- Due to the number of participating schools outnumbering the number of lanes, each event is split into A and B Finals. Schools marked in italics participated in the B Final.

=== Open 2nd VIII ===
Year	Winner	2nd	3rd
1999	St Margaret's	Somerville	Brisbane Girls Grammar
2000	St Margaret's	Somerville	All Hallows
2001	Somerville	St Margaret's	All Hallows
2002	Somerville	St Margaret's	St Aidan's
2003	Somerville	St Aidan's	St Margaret's
2004	Somerville	St Aidan's	Stuartholme
2005	Somerville	St Margaret's	St Aidan's
2006	St Aidan's	Somerville	St Margaret's
2007	St Aidan's	St Margaret's	Brisbane Girls Grammar
2008	St Aidan's	St Margaret's	Brisbane Girls Grammar
2009	St Aidan's	St Margaret's	Somerville
2010	Somerville	Stuartholme	St Margaret's
2011	Stuartholme	St Margaret's	Somerville
2012	Somerville	All Hallows	Stuartholme

=== The Open Single Scull (Div 1) ===
Year	Winner	2nd	3rd
1999	Brisbane State High School	St Aidan's	Brisbane Girls Grammar
2000	Race cancelled due to bad weather.		
2001	St Margaret's	St Peter's	St Aidan's
2002	Brisbane State High School	St Margaret's	Somerville
2003	St Margaret's	Lourdes Hill	Brisbane Girls Grammar
2004	St Margaret's	Lourdes Hill	Brisbane State High School
2005	Stuartholme	St Peter's	Somerville
2006	Stuartholme	Somerville	St Peter's
2007	St Peter's	St Aidan's	Somerville
2008	St Peter's	Stuartholme	Somerville
2009	St Margaret's	St Peter's	St Aidan's
2010	St Peter's	Brisbane State High School	Stuartholme
2011	St Margaret's	St Aidan's	St Peter's
2012	St Peter's	Somerville	Brisbane Girls Grammar

== See also ==
- Head of the River (Australia)
- Great Public Schools Association of Queensland
- Queensland Girls' Secondary Schools Sports Association
