= O'Connor Cup =

The O'Connor Cup may refer to:

- HEC O'Connor Cup/Michael O'Connor Cup, a Ladies' Gaelic football intervarsity competition.
- O'Connor Cup, awarded to the winners of the Munster Senior Club Football Championship.
- Michael O'Connor Cup, awarded to the winners of the Kerry Club Football Championship.
- O'Connor Cup, a trophy awarded at the Head of the River regatta.
- Liam O'Connor Cup, an inter county under-20 Gaelic football competition.
- Tom O'Connor Cup, featuring Ladies' Gaelic football teams affiliated with London GAA
- James O'Connor Cup, featuring teams affiliated with Leinster Rugby.
