= Queensland Girls' Secondary Schools Sports Association =

- Formation: 1908
- Headquarters: Brisbane, Queensland, Australia
- Members: 10 member schools
- Official language: English
- Website: qgsssa.com.au

The Queensland Girls' Secondary Schools Sports Association Inc (QGSSSA) is a sporting association for girls from eight private girls' schools, one co-educational private school, and one co-educational public school, based in Brisbane, Queensland, Australia. Established in 1908 as the Secondary Schools Sports Association, inter-school competition commenced in 1909 in the sports of Swimming, Tennis and Basket Ball. Competition is offered to, and organised for, girls from Years 7 to 12.

== History ==
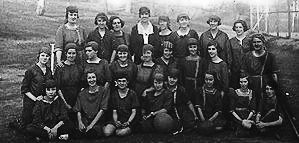
Somerville House athletics team, c.1900

The Sports Association of Secondary Schools of Queensland, was formed in 1908, with three members: Brisbane Girls Grammar School, The Brisbane High School for Girls (now Somerville House) and Eton High School (now St Margaret's Anglican Girls School). There is some evidence to suggest that Moreton Bay College may also have participated in sporting competitions in the early years. The association had been initiated by Constance Elizabeth Harker, co-Principal of Somerville House, and its aim was to "promote a friendly spirit between schools and at the same time deepen and strengthen the loyalty of individual girls to their own school".

Ipswich Girls' Grammar School and St Hilda's School joined the Association in 1911, followed by Brisbane State High School in 1921, St Aidan's Anglican Girls' School in 1939, Clayfield College in 1941, Moreton Bay College in 1945, and St Peters Lutheran College in 1946. Several other schools have also been members of the QGSSSA at some time, – Girton College Toowoomba, Commercial State High School, University High School, Wynnum High School and Technical College.

== Schools ==
=== Current Members ===
School	Location	Enrolment	Founded	Denomination	Day/Boarding	Year Entered Competition	School Colors
Brisbane Girls Grammar School	Spring Hill	~1,150	1875	Non-Denominational	Day	1908	Royal blue
Brisbane State High School	South Brisbane	~3,150	1921	Secular	Day	1921	Cerise and navy blue
Clayfield College	Clayfield	~945	1931	Uniting Church	Day & Boarding	1941	Dark green, gold and navy
Ipswich Girls' Grammar School	Ipswich	~860	1892	Non-Denominational	Day & Boarding	1911	Navy blue, pale blue, and white
Moreton Bay College	Manly West	~1,137	1901	Uniting Church	Day	1945	Maroon and gold, with pink often used to represent sporting teams
St Aidan's Anglican Girls' School	Corinda	~857	1929	Anglican	Day	1939	Navy, white and brown
St Hilda's School	Southport	~1,188	1912	Anglican	Day & Boarding	1911	Navy, red and gold
St Margaret's Anglican Girls School	Ascot	~900	1895	Anglican	Day & Boarding	1908	Navy, white and brown
Somerville House	South Brisbane	~1,200	1899	Uniting Church	Day & Boarding	1908	Navy, apple green and white

== Head of the Schoolgirls Regatta ==
Swimming

== See also ==
- List of schools in Queensland
- Head of the River (Queensland)
