= Stuartholme School =

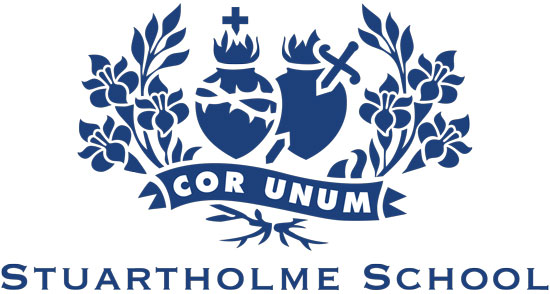

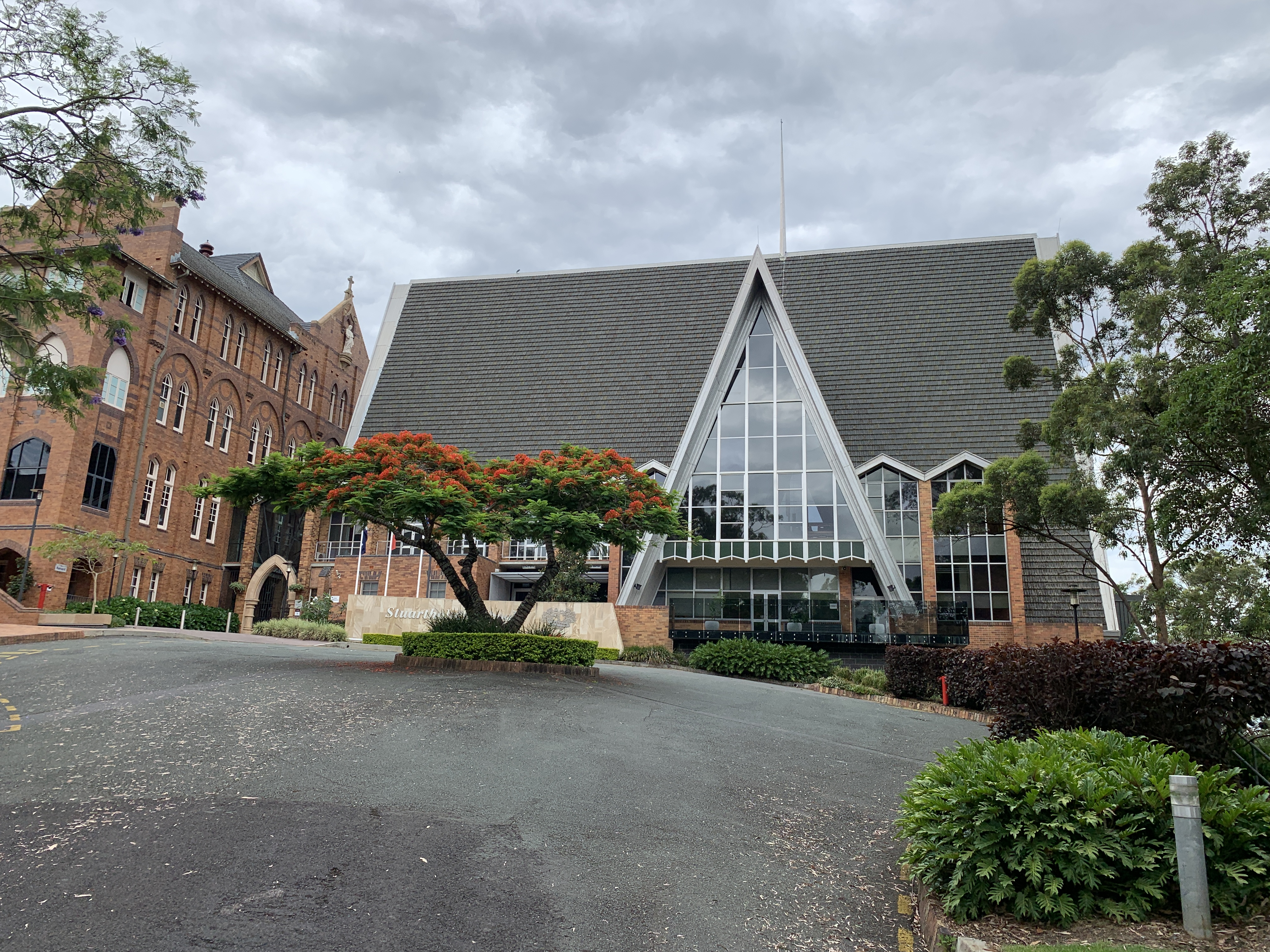
- Chapel, Stuartholme School, 2021

Location
- Toowong, Queensland; Australia
- Coordinates: 27.4692°S 152.9738°E

Information
- Type: Independent secondary day and boarding school
- Motto: Latin: Cor Unum (One Heart)
- Religious affiliation: Catholicism
- Denomination: Society of the Sacred Heart
- Established: 1 August 1920; 105 years ago
- Founder: Archbishop James Duhig
- Oversight: Network of Sacred Heart Schools
- Principal: Daniel Crump
- Years offered: 5–12
- Gender: Girls
- Enrolment: c. 700
- Slogan: Cor Unum
- Affiliations: Alliance of Girls' Schools Australasia; Association of Heads of Independent Schools of Australia; Australian Boarding Schools Association; Catholic Secondary Schoolgirls' Sports Association
- Website: www.stuartholme.com

Stuartholme School is an independent Catholic secondary day and boarding school for girls, located at 365 Birdwood Terrace, Toowong, Brisbane, Queensland, Australia. Established in 1920 by the Society of the Sacred Heart, the school caters for approximately 700 students from Years 5 to 12, including 150 boarders. Year 5 commences in 2024 and Year 6 commences in 2025.

Stuartholme is a member of the Alliance of Girls' Schools Australasia (AGSA), the Association of Heads of Independent Schools of Australia (AHISA), the Australian Boarding Schools Association (ABSA), and the Catholic Secondary Schoolgirls' Sports Association (CaSSSA).

The school is listed on the Brisbane Heritage Register.

== History ==
Stuartholme is a part of the Society of the Sacred Heart of Jesus, started in 1800 by Madeline Sophie Barat in France.

In 1882 farmer Richard Wingfield Stuart purchased a 57-acre block of land on the slopes of Mount Coot-tha (then known as One Tree Hill) in Brisbane. He built a house on the property and called the farm and the house Stuartholme. On Good Friday 16 April 1897, the house was destroyed by fire, which was believed to be caused by a meteor or "comet".

In 1914 Reverend Mother Janet Erskine Stuart, Superior General of the Society of the Sacred Heart, visited Brisbane to meet Archbishop James Duhig and thought it was a good idea to start a school in Brisbane. The order of the Sacred Heart came to Stuartholme in 1917 because Duhig had invited them to run the school.

In September 1917 Duhig purchased the land of the then-deceased Mr Stuart .

Duhig laid the foundation stone of the school building on 25 May 1919. At that ceremony, Duhig revealed the coincidence that Richard Wingfield Stuart was the step-brother of Reverend Mother Janet Eskine Stuart. Although by then deceased, Reverend Mother Stuart was aware sisters from her order had been invited to Brisbane, but not that her step-brother's property would be the site of the new convent and school.

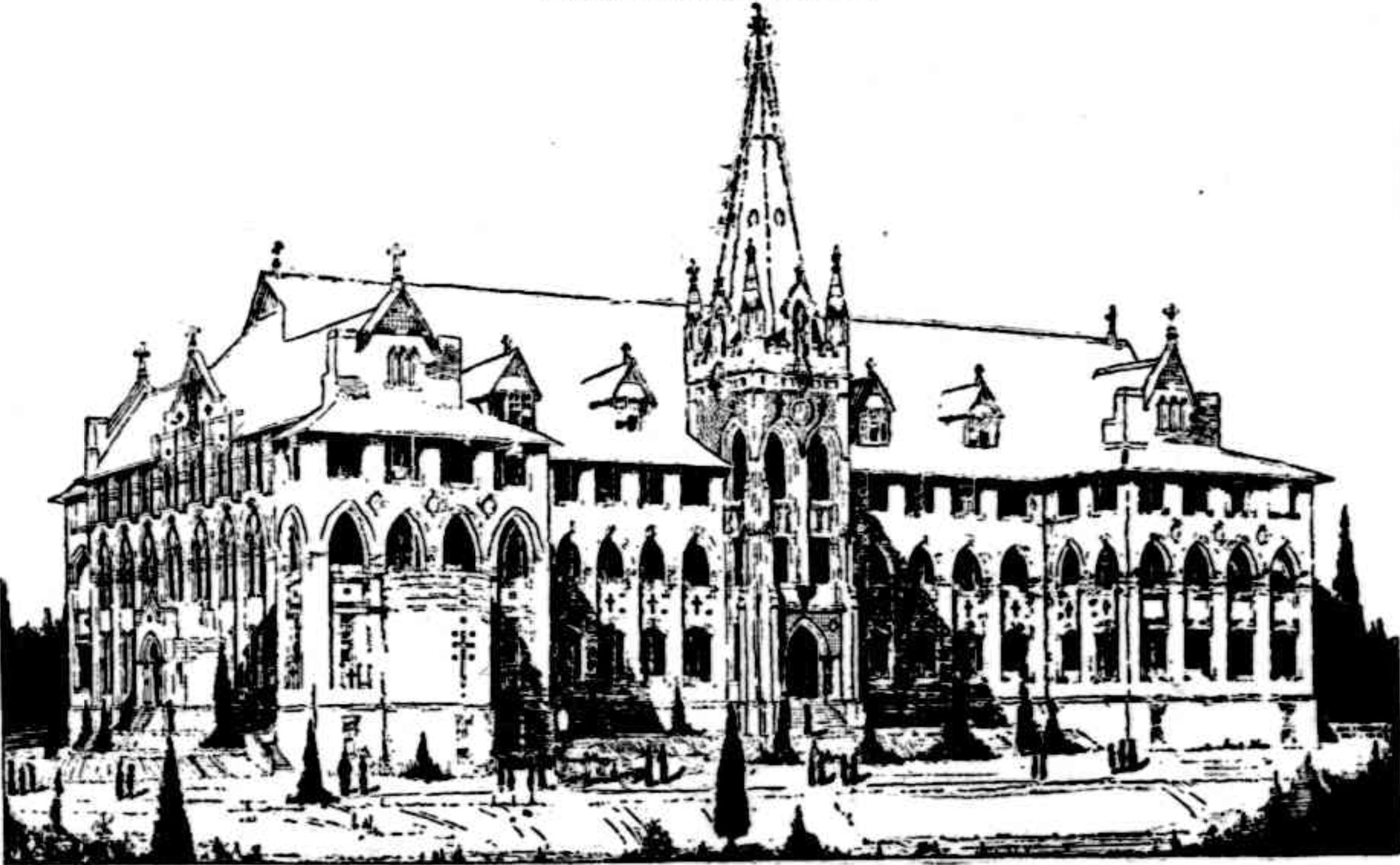
Sketch of original building, 1925

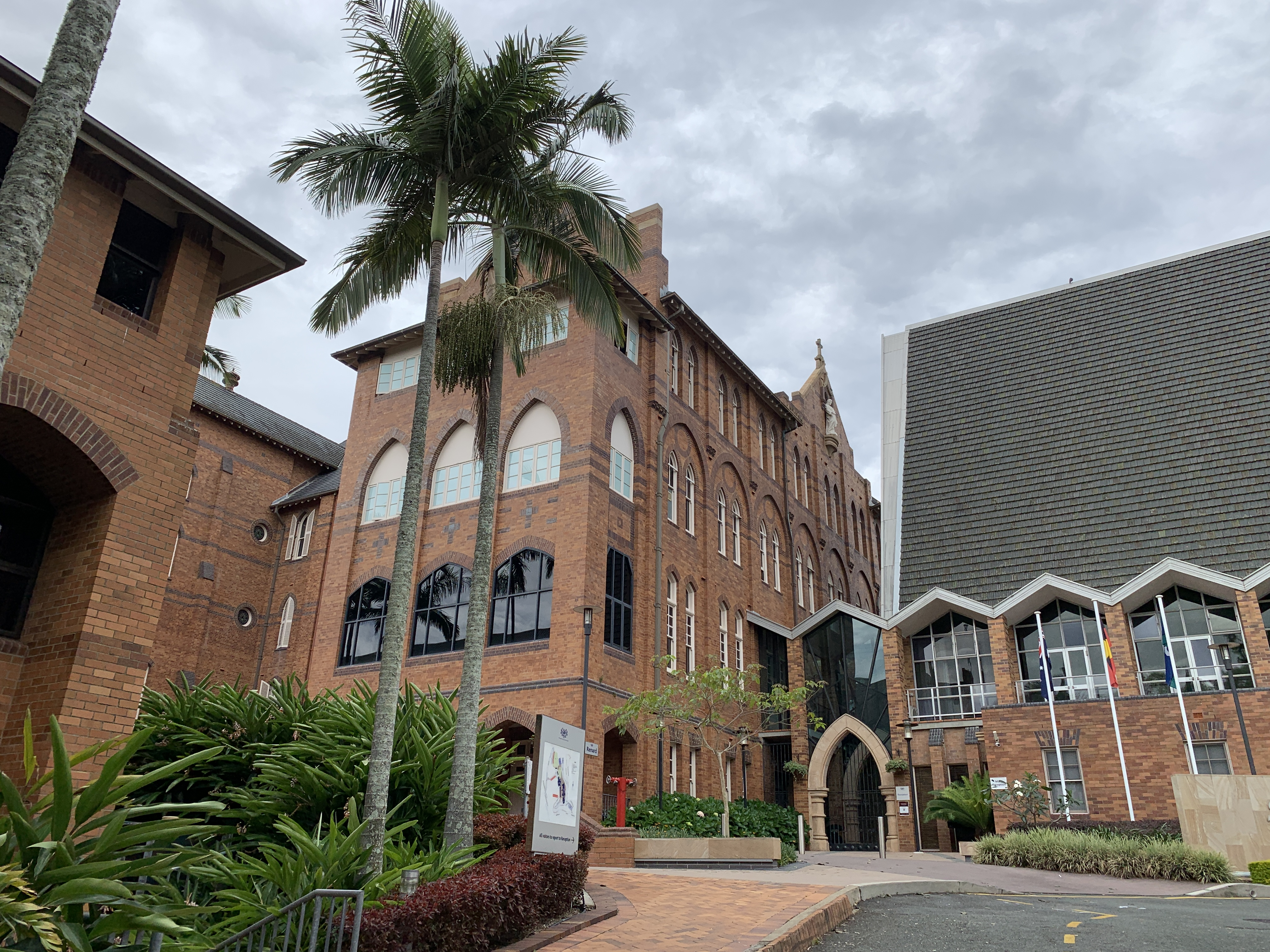
Side view of original school building (centre), 2021

In February 1920 the sisters of the Sacred Heart moved into the school. On 1 August 1920 Stuartholme was officially opened by Apostolic Delegate Bartolomeo Cattaneo assisted by Duhig, although the building was not yet completed. In the first year the school was run on the verandas of the cottages. The nuns and pupils lived in the cottages and with five students initially enrolled. The number of pupils grew and between 1925 and 1940 there were 36 students attending Stuartholme.

During World War II the school was taken over for use as the United States Army 42nd General Hospital. The students were relocated initially to Canungra and then later to Southport.

In the 1960s and 1970s young women had stopped entering the religious life so Sacred Heart and other Catholic schools were staffed mainly by lay people. David Manning was the first lay principal, appointed in 1983, who served until 2003. Daniel Crump is the current principal.

In the past ten years Stuartholme has had some significant changes including a lot of re-modelling, but the Sacred Heart education has remained a part of the school curriculum.

On 17 May 2013 the school was listed on the Brisbane Heritage Register.

== Co-curriculum ==
=== Sport ===
Stuartholme students may compete in sporting competitions conducted by the Catholic Secondary Girls School Sports Association and the Independent Schools Association.

The sports Stuartholme compete in are: athletics, Australian rules football, basketball, cross country running, equestrian, hockey, netball, rowing, sailing, soccer, softball, swimming, tennis, touch football, volleyball, and water polo.

== Notable alumnae ==
- Davida Allen – artist
- Tracey Curro – journalist; former reporter for the Seven Network's Beyond 2000, and 60 Minutes (also attended Ingham State High School)
- Claire Holt – actress
- Dr Sarah Ogilvie - lexicographer and linguist
- Susan McDonald – Senator for Queensland
- Jane Moran – national water polo champion and Olympic Bronze medalist
- Katie Noonan – lead singer of george

== See also ==
- Catholic education in Australia
- List of schools in Queensland
- Head of the River
