= Geraldine Moses =

Australian consulting pharmacist and professor of pharmacy

Geraldine Moses AM
- Education: BPharm; DClinPharm; AdvPracPharm
- Medical career
- Profession: Adjunct Associate Professor
- Institutions: School of Pharmacy, University of Queensland

Geraldine Michelle Moses, AM is an Australian doctor of clinical pharmacy, a consultant pharmacist, and an Adjunct Associate Professor of clinical pharmacy at the University of Queensland. She is a Senior Clinical Pharmacist at Mater Pharmacy Services in Brisbane.

Moses provides advisory and educational services to many organizations, she founded PharEducation which provides seminars, and she has set up numerous information help lines for the general public and for health care professionals.

In 2019, she was appointed a Member of the Order of Australia for her services to medicine.

== Education ==
Moses attended St Aidan's Anglican Girls' School in Brisbane, matriculating in 1980. After graduating with a BPharm, Moses earned a postgraduate Diploma in Clinical Pharmacy in 1999, followed by a Doctorate in Clinical Pharmacy (DClinPharm) focused in Pharmacovigilance from The University of Queensland in 2005. She also holds certification as an Advanced Practice pharmacist (AdvPracPharm) (2015).

== Medical career ==
Since 1992 Moses has worked as Consultant Drug Information Pharmacist to the Academic Practice Unit of Mater Health Services, Mater Misericordiae, and since 2015 she has been an Adjunct Associate Professor in the School of Pharmacy at the University of Queensland.

She consults to many organisations, including the Queensland Office of Health Ombudsman, the Commission for Safety in Quality in Health Care, the Department of Veterans Affairs, and the New Zealand Dental Association. She jointly founded PharmEducation, which provides seminars on medicines and medication management for health care professionals, and has been a director of it since 2010.

Moses is well known for her work on information helplines for consumers and professionals, being one of the founders of the Queensland Medication Helpline in 1995. She was leader of the Medicines Information Line pilot project at Mater Health Services, Mater Misericordiae from 2003 to 2006, funded by the Australian Council on Safety and Quality in Health Care. In addition to providing advice to consumers, it also provided insight into what issues people are having. Moses was especially concerned about the issues caused by complementary and over-the-counter medicines.

In 2013 she led the establishment of “Pharma-Advice”, a national drug information service for dentists, and she serves as Consultant Pharmacist there. She is a frequent speaker at seminars and conferences for the Australian Dental Association.

=== Public engagement ===
Moses started hosting a regular show Medication Talkback on ABC radio in 1990, and it ran until 2004. During this time, she also co-hosted Conversation hour on ABC radio for two years, medical talk-back shows on radio 4BC and Vision Radio. On television, she co-hosted Your Health on channel Briz31, and was a regular guest on Channel 9's Extra program. She continues to host health programs for Rural Health TV.

In addition, she is regularly interviewed for her expert commentary and she has written for the public, with published articles on subjects including the need for tougher regulation for alternative medicines in the wake of the biggest drug recall in Australian history from Pan Pharmaceuticals, warnings that so-called "natural remedies" are not harmless, adverse reactions from the uncontrolled practice of adding herbal medicines to foods and beverages, risks of the popular sleep drug Stilnox and the consequent legal action.

Building on her early media interactions, Moses joined with colleagues from the Mater Hospital in Brisbane to create The Medicines Online, which was the first public telephone help line about drug information in Australia. This led to her being awarded the Churchill Fellowship in 1999, that funded her to investigate best practice in consumer drug information internationally.

Her persistence in holding supplementary, complementary and alternative medicines to the same standards as accepted treatments has drawn criticism from bodies that support those industries.

=== Published works ===
As of February 2021, Google Scholar lists 60 publications by Moses, and it estimates her h-index as 8. She wrote a series of articles for the Australian Family Physician journal, mostly concerning so-called "complementary medicines". Moses' most notable published academic work is the Adverse Drug Reaction Reporting Study, 2000–2002.

== Awards and recognition ==
Moses is a Fellow of the Australian College of Pharmacy, and has received the following honours:

- 1993 - Queensland Bowl of Hygeia award to recognize "outstanding records of civic leadership".
- 1996 - William A Harris Memorial Award, Queensland Branch, Society of Hospital Pharmacists Australia.
- 1999 - Churchill Fellowship, regarding consumer role in pharmacovigilance.
- 2002 - Pharmaceutical Society of Australia Australian Pharmacist of the Year.
- 2012 - Fellow of the Pharmaceutical Society of Australia
- 2013 - Medal of Merit from the Australian Dental Association for services to the dental profession as a non-dentist.
- 2015 - Advanced Practice Pharmacist, Australian Pharmacy Council.
- 2018 - Honorary Member of NPS MedicineWise "in recognition of a varied and exemplary career, including as the provider of the ADA’s PharmaAdvice service".
- 2019 - Member of the Order of Australia "for significant service to medicine as a pharmacist, particularly through advisory and educational roles”.

== Personal life ==
Moses is married, with a daughter, Rebecca.
