= Lourdes Hill College =

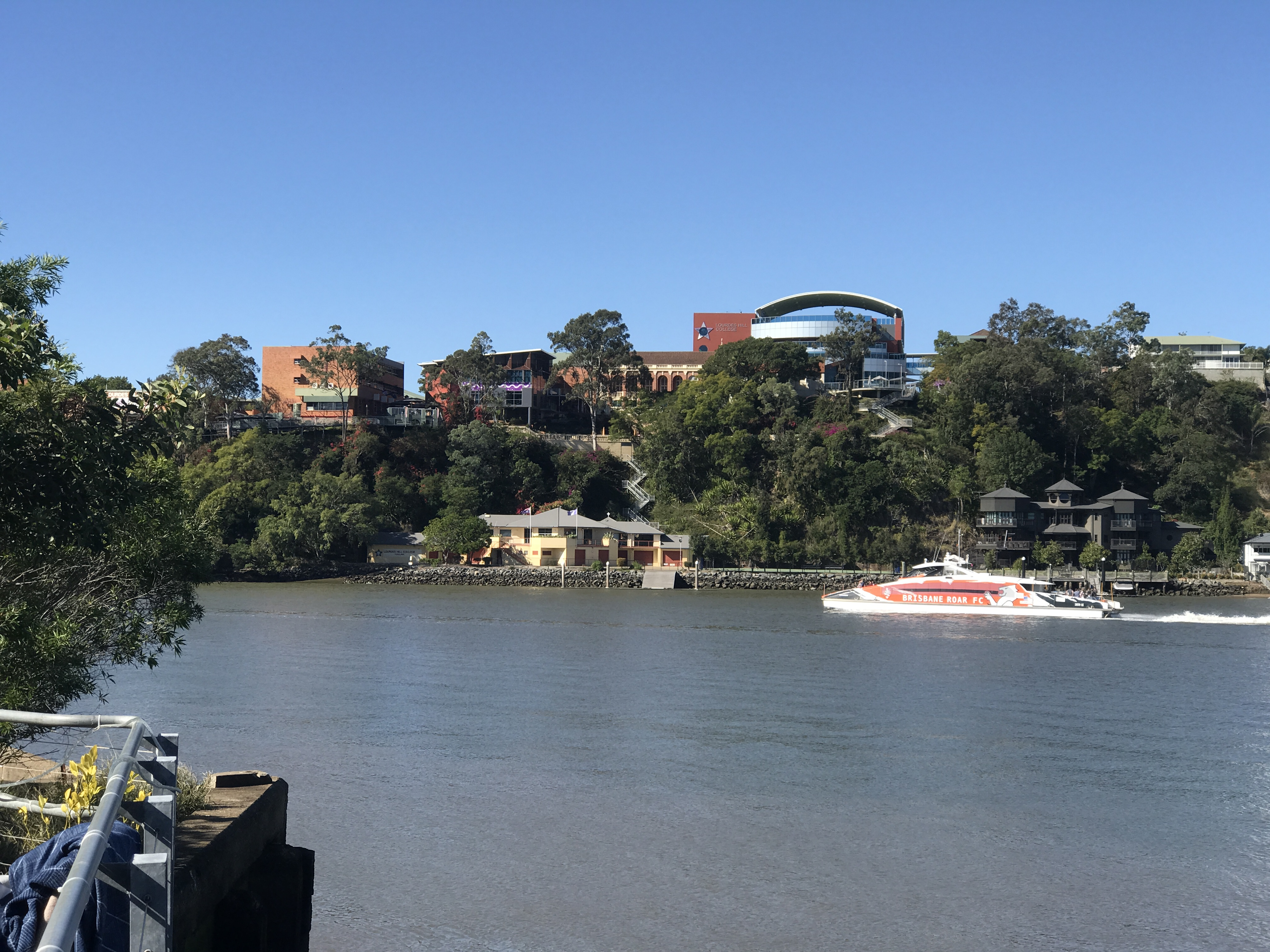
- Lourdes Hill College, seen from New Farm across the Brisbane River

Location
- Hawthorne, Brisbane, Queensland; Australia; 27°28′8.94″S 153°3′30.33″E

Information
- Type: Good Samaritan Education secondary day school
- Motto: Latin: Respice Stellam Voca Mariam (Look to the Star and Call Upon Mary)
- Religious affiliation: Good Samaritan Education
- Denomination: Roman Catholic
- Established: 1916; 110 years ago
- Founders: Sisters of the Good Samaritan
- Principal: Kay Gleeson
- Years: 7–12
- Gender: Girls
- Enrolment: c. 1,000
- Houses: Beck; Cullen; D'Arcy; Healy; Hendricks; McKee; Lee; Roche
- Colours: Silver, purple and white
- Affiliations: Association of Heads of Independent Schools of Australia; Brisbane Schoolgirls Sporting Association; Catholic Secondary Schoolgirls' Sports Association
- Website: lhc.qld.edu.au

Lourdes Hill College is a Good Samaritan Education secondary day school for girls, located in the inner-eastern Brisbane suburb of Hawthorne, Queensland, Australia. The college also operated as a boarding school until its boarding facilities were closed in 2011.

The college was named after Lourdes in France, where Mary is said to have appeared to a young girl named Bernadette Soubirous. It was founded in 1916 by the Sisters of the Good Samaritan of the Order of Saint Benedict, and as of 2025 caters for approximately 1300 students from Years 5 to 12 (9 to 18 years of age).

Lourdes Hill is one of a network of 10 schools under the care of Good Samaritan Education, a church entity set up to take over the educational mission of the Sisters of the Good Samaritan. The college was incorporated by the Sisters of the Good Samaritan in 1986 as a Company Limited by Guarantee. It is affiliated with the Queensland Catholic Education Commission, the Association of Heads of Independent Schools of Australia (AHISA), and the Brisbane Schoolgirls Sporting Association (BSGSA). The school was previously affiliated with the Australian Boarding Schools' Association (ABSA).

== History ==
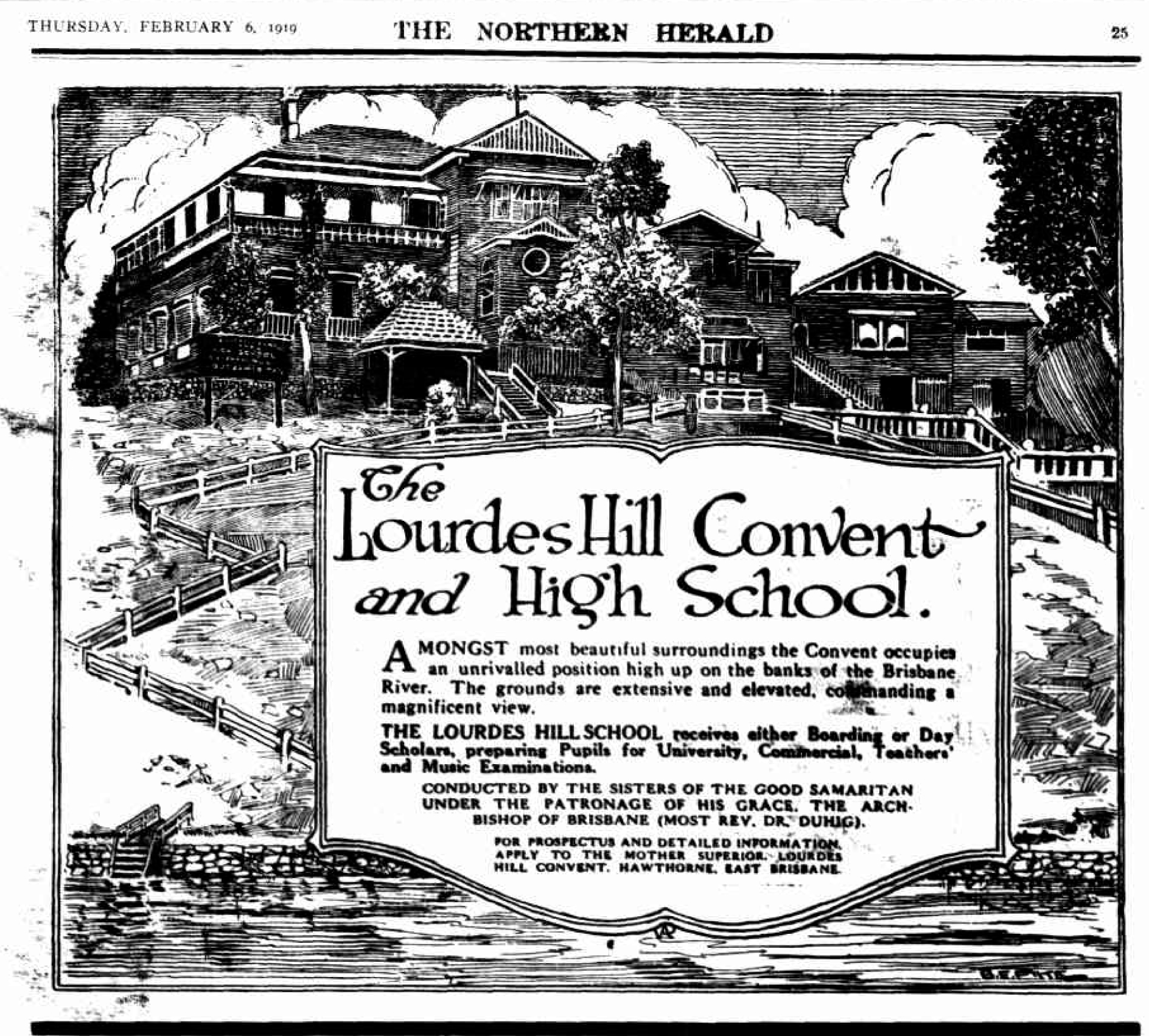
1919 advertisement for Lourdes Hill Convent and High School

Lourdes Hill College traces its origins to 1915, when the Archbishop of Brisbane, James Duhig, invited the Sisters of the Good Samaritan to establish schools in Brisbane. Subsequently, that same year, thirteen Sisters travelled from Sydney opening convents at Bulimba and Coorparoo.

Archbishop Duhig offered the sisters one of the choicest sites in Brisbane for a convent and a secondary girls' school. Lourdes Hill College was established in January 1916, with Mother Berchmans and thirteen sisters sailing up the river on the ship "Osterley" and docking at the site.

The college was named after Lourdes in France, where Mary is said to have appeared to a young girl named Bernadette Soubirous. When the Good Samaritan Sisters were setting up the school, Archbishop Duhig commented that the site reminded him of Lourdes.

== Campus ==
Lourdes Hill College is situated on the Bulimba Reach of the Brisbane River in suburban Hawthorne, across the river from New Farm Park. The campus is 5 kilometres (3.1 mi) from the Brisbane central business district.

=== Boarding ===
The aim of the College Boarding House was to provide a homely environment. Year 8 students lived in rooms of four girls, while Years 9 to 11 students were in single-, two-, three- or four-bed accommodation. All Seniors had single rooms. The Boarding House closed in 2010.

== Curriculum ==
Lourdes Hill offers a broad curriculum covering the faculties of English, Religious Education, Mathematics, Science, Social Science, Languages, Information Technology, Business, Visual Arts, Performing Arts, Health and Physical Education, and Hospitality.

Students may also choose to combine their secondary school studies with Vocational Educational Training (VET) and workplace learning. The Work Education Program can be incorporated into the Year 11 and 12 academic program. Students who complete their senior studies in combination with this program receive a Senior Certificate and a QTAC selection rank that allows access to TAFE and many university courses. Opportunities also exist for students to commence a school based apprenticeship or traineeship, involving part-time school and part-time paid employment.

== Co-curriculum ==
=== Sport ===
Lourdes Hill students may participate in a range of sporting activities, both at social and competition level. The school is a member of the Catholic Secondary Schoolgirls' Sports Association (CaSSSA) and participates in Wednesday afternoon competitions for sports such as basketball, hockey, netball, soccer, softball, touch football, and volleyball. Carnivals are also held for swimming, athletics, and cross country, both within school and against other girls' schools.

The college offers five sporting clubs, in canoeing, rowing, hockey, sailing, sport aerobics and tennis. These clubs participate in a variety of competitions.

==== AFL Team Achievements ====
===== Senior Female (Years 10-12) =====
- AFL Queensland Schools Cup

(bronze) Third Place: 2018

== Notable alumnae ==
Alumnae of Lourdes Hill College are commonly referred to as 'Lourdanians', and may elect to join the schools alumni association, the Lourdes Hill College Past Pupils Association (LHCPPA). Some notable Lourdanians include:

- Natalie Blair – actor, best known for role as Carmella Cammeniti on Neighbours
- Linda Cassell – Former professional Australian tennis player, now member of the Sisters of the Good Samaritan
- Candy Devine – Australian broadcaster
- Janet Fielding – actor, best known for role as Tegan Jovanka in Doctor Who.
- Susie O'Neill – Olympic Swimmer
- Clare Polkinghorne – co-captain, Australia women's national football team (the Matildas)
- Georgia Sheehan – Australian gold medalist in diving
- Jackie Trad – politician, former Deputy Premier of Queensland
- Astrid Jorgensen – Founder and director of Pub Choir

== See also ==
- List of schools in Queensland
- Head of the River (Queensland)
