= St Aidan's Anglican Girls' School =

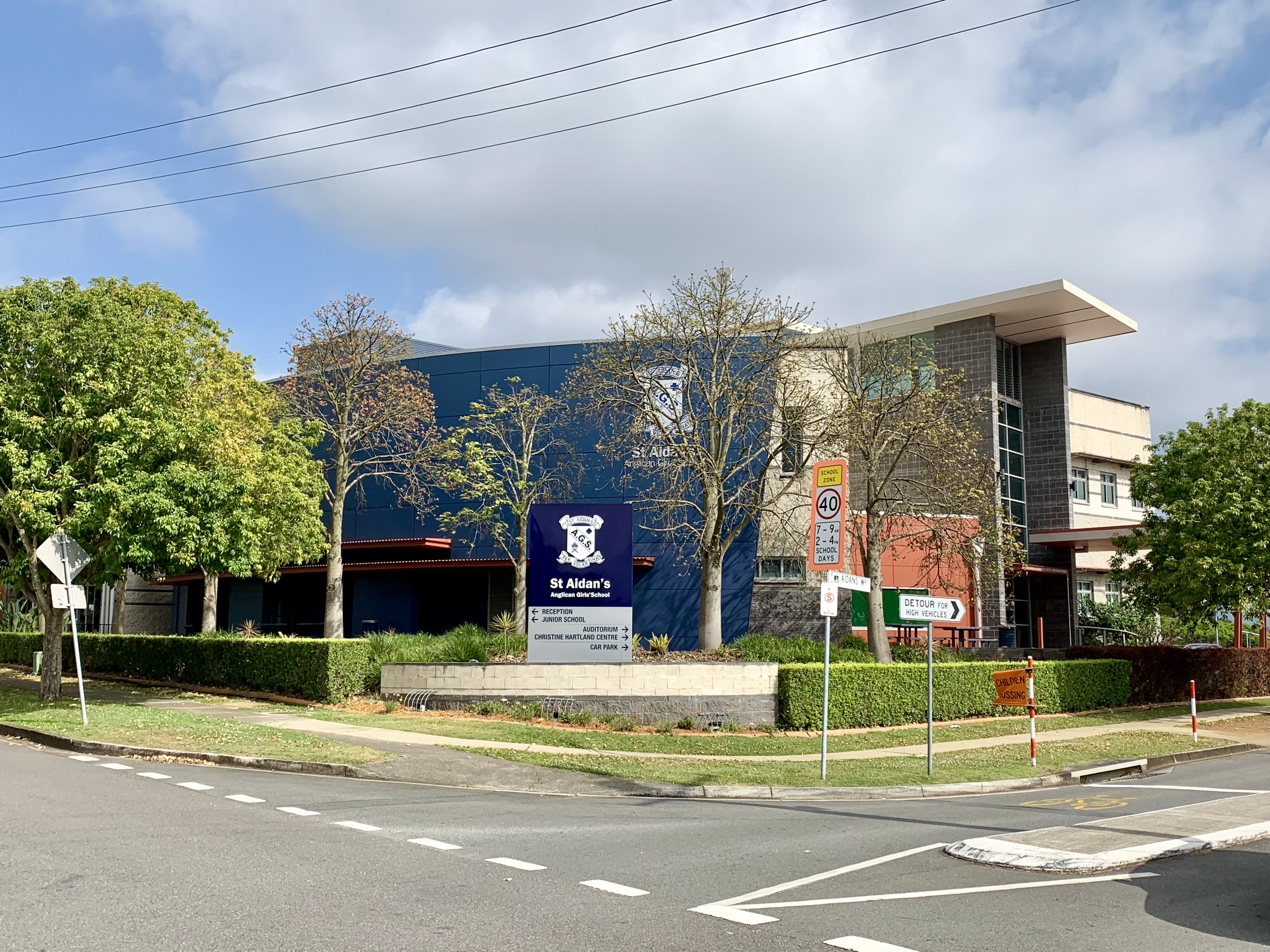

Location
- Corinda, Queensland; Australia
- Coordinates: 27°32′18″S 152°58′44″E

Information
- Type: Independent single-sex girls' day school
- Motto: Per Volar Sunata (Born to Fly) (Note: ""per volar sù nata", from Dante's Purgatorio XII, 95)
- Denomination: Anglican
- Established: 1929
- Sister school: Anglican Church Grammar School
- Chairperson: Stephen Green
- Principal: Toni Riordan
- Chaplain: Gillian Moses
- Enrolment: ~900 (P–12)
- Colours: Blue, white, brown
- Website: staidans.qld.edu.au

St Aidan's Anglican Girls' School is an independent, Anglican, day school for girls, located in Corinda, a western suburb of Brisbane, Queensland, Australia. It was named after Aidan of Lindisfarne, an Irish saint.

Founded in 1929 by the Sisters of the Society of the Sacred Advent, the school has a non-selective enrolment policy and caters for approximately 800 students from Kindergarten to Year 12. Along with St Margaret's Anglican Girls School, it remains a school run by the Sisters of the Society of the Sacred Advent (part of the Anglican Diocese of Brisbane).

St Aidan's is affiliated with the Association of Heads of Independent Schools of Australia (AHISA), the Junior School Heads Association of Australia (JSHAA), the Alliance of Girls' Schools Australasia (AGSA), and has been a member of the Queensland Girls' Secondary Schools Sports Association (QGSSSA) since 1939.

== Tradition ==
St Aidan's was opened, in Corinda, on 4 February 1929, by Henry Frewen Le Fanu. Sister Elisabeth was Sister-in-Charge, Mrs Christine Hartland was Headmistress, and Canon W. E. C. Barrett was Chaplain; the house Barrett was named after his daughter Helen (1921–2019).

The initial enrolment, comprising kindergarten, first, third and fourth forms was 17, including one boy. This had risen to 42 by the end of the year, when Miss Sutton had joined the staff with students from her small school at Sherwood. Boys were admitted into SSA schools so that they could have an Anglican education before attending nearby Anglican Church Grammar School.

The depression years affected most church schools negatively but St Aidan's had 65 students by 1930 and 134 by 1934.

The Sisters were fifty years ahead of time when they appointed a married woman to the position of Headmistress: at the time, State School teachers were forced to resign as soon as they married.

In 1948 the first Sister-in-Charge, Sister Lois, heralded the beginning of a 32-year period of St Aidan's having Sisters-in-Charge. For the previous 19 years the Sisters had always come out from the Community House to teach Divinity and to prepare students for confirmation. Overall the sisters' views of education were farsighted and progressive and they deplored any view which denigrated the value of education for girls. In Sister Lois' 1951 report, she stated "Girls must be equally educated as, at the very least, they will need trained, well-informed and keen minds to be capable mothers."

Sister Moira stressed the importance of parental involvement in student spiritual practices. Under her guidance, support for the Arts had grown, essential Senior School building works were under construction and Science subjects had received a much-needed boost.

Sister Helen Marie succeeded Sister Moira in 1962 and, in 1964, the school saw a year of extraordinary building and academic change and expansion – plus increased enrolments. Sister Rachel's years saw much expansion and progress within the school in many aspects. The enrolment had risen to 312 at the start of 1965, which meant that the school needed an urgent building programme to provide further classrooms and she embarked on several projects. Sister Kathleen was supported by Sister Norma and Sister Bridget, and Sister Julian who acted as housekeeper for them at Broads.

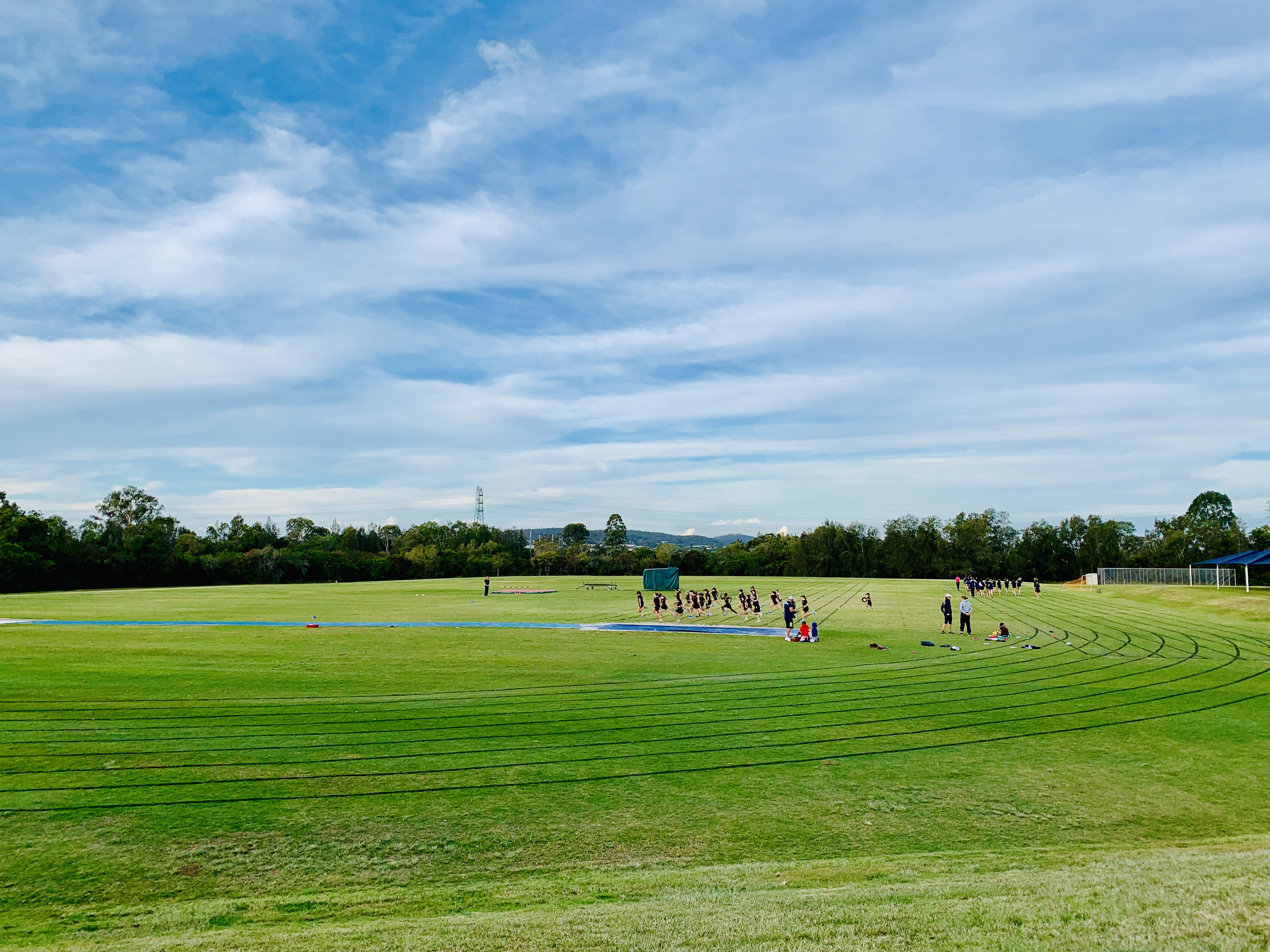
Ambiwerra Sportsfield

Marjorie Neil succeeded Sister Julian as principal, leading St Aidan's for 12 years from 1980. She was followed in 1992 by Patricia Evans, a former teacher of German language at the School.

Mrs Spiller, a former teacher at St Margaret's, Hillbrook Anglican School, Deputy Principal of St Aidan's, then became the new principal to herald the new century. Mrs Spiller has led the School through the development and enhancement of the Junior School facilities, the creation of the Science and Technology building, and the redevelopment of the Performing Arts Centre (PAC), to be known as The Christine Hartland Centre (completed mid-2010) and extension of the Junior School (completed mid-2010).

== House system ==
As with most Australian schools, St Aidan's utilises a house system. The school has six houses:

	Colour	Named after
Austen	Red	Author Jane Austen
Barrett	Pink	Past School Captain (1938) Helen Barrett
Bronte	Yellow	Authors Charlotte, Anne and Emily Brontë
Cavell	Blue	WW1 nurse Edith Cavell
Hartland	Purple	Former principal Mrs. Hartland
Nightingale	Green	Crimean War nurse Florence Nightingale

== Notable alumnae ==
- Kate Carnell (1972), former Chief Minister ACT, executive director Australian Division General Practitioners, chief executive officer of the Australian General Practice Network; recipient of the Centenary Medal 2003
- Sarah-Jane Clarke AM (1992), designer and one of the founders of Sass & Bide
- Gayle Mayes (1973), Olympian
- Kate Miller-Heidke (1998), singer-songwriter
- Geraldine Moses (1980), consulting pharmacist and professor of pharmacy

== See also ==
- Lists of schools in Queensland
- Education in Australia

== Notes and references ==
Notes
