= Brisbane State High School =

- Crest of Brisbane State High School

Location
- South Brisbane, Queensland; Australia; 27°28′49″S 153°1′5″E

Information
- Type: Public, selective, co-educational, secondary, day school
- Motto: Latin: Scientia est Potestas (Knowledge is Power)
- Established: 1913, 1921 (official); 1913–1925 (known as The Normal School); 1925–present (known as Brisbane State High School)
- Principal: Greg Pierce
- Enrolment: 3,602 (7–12) (2026)
- Campus: Urban (South Brisbane)
- Colours: Cerise and navy blue
- Website: statehigh.com.au

Brisbane State High School (BSHS), commonly State High, is a partially selective, co-educational state secondary school, located in South Brisbane, Queensland, Australia. It is a member of the Great Public Schools Association of Queensland (GPS), and the Queensland Girls' Secondary Schools Sports Association (QGSSSA). It was the first state secondary school established in Brisbane, as well as the first academic state high school in Queensland.

Brisbane State High School hosts approximately 3600 students from Year 7 to Year 12, with a larger proportion of enrolments allocated to the local catchment area than to its selective-entry program. Of the places available in the selective-entry program, approximately 50% are allocated to academic entry, 40% to sporting entry, and 10% to cultural entry (Music and Art).

The school is noted for its academic and sporting success in Queensland, and for being the only government school in the GPS and QGSSSA. In 2023, Brisbane State High School achieved the most 99.95 ATAR scores in the country, the highest university entrance score.

== History ==
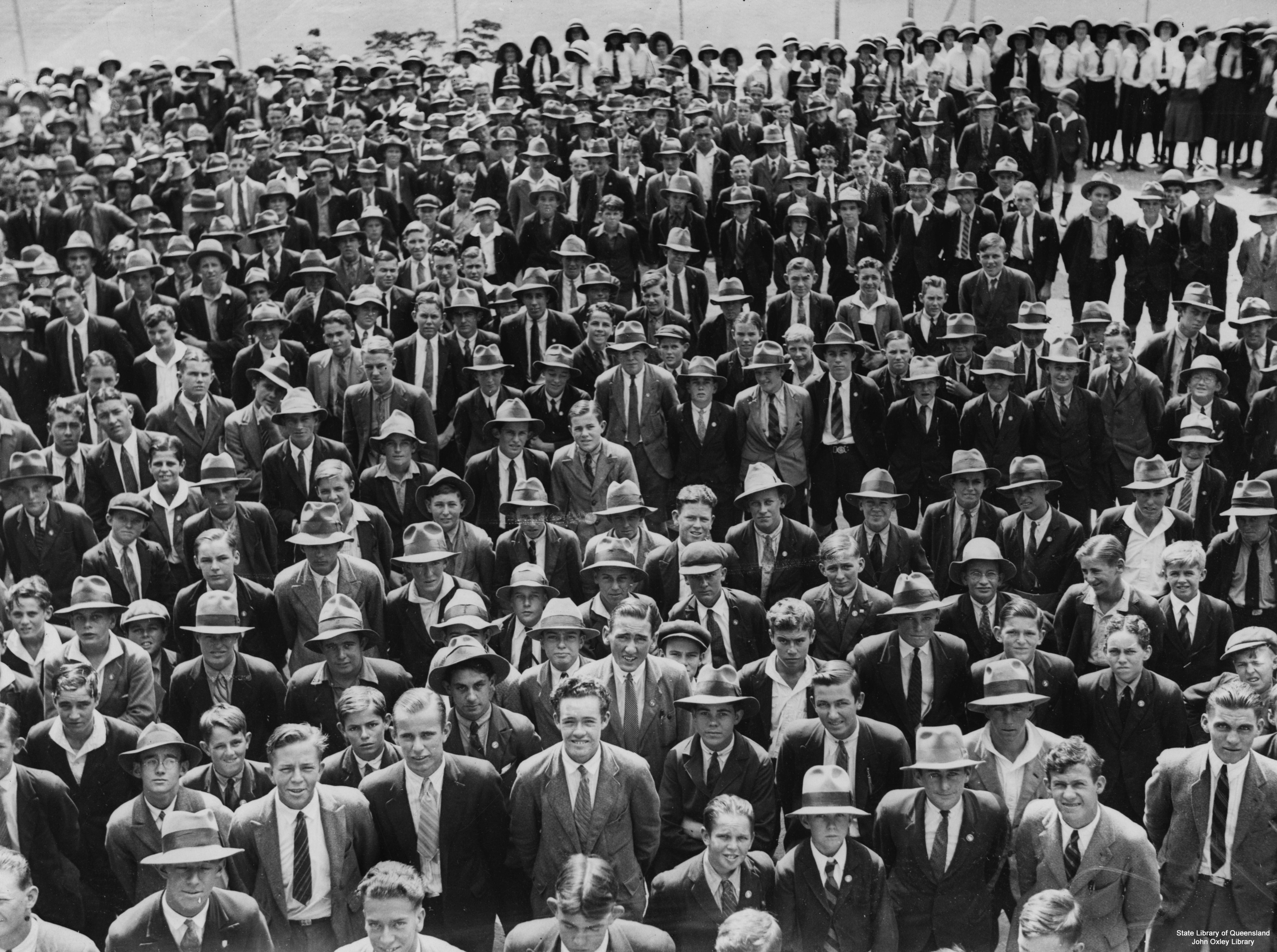
Pupils listening to the Anzac Day address, 23 April 1932

T. Max Hawkins, historian and author of The Queensland Great Public Schools – A History, wrote of the origins of Brisbane State High School:

The school developed from the School of Arts in Ann Street, and later from the old Normal School which was built by convict labour on the site where the State Government Insurance building now stands...The year 1913 is generally taken as the start of the Brisbane State High School, a co-educational school which, by 1964, had expanded to accommodate 1310 students, 891 of them boys.

Further information on the origins of the school is discussed in Philip Walker Davidson's thesis:

Headmasters of various metropolitan state schools were asked to nominate 76 boys and girls for admission to the new school, and a further 70 paying students made up the first year's enrolment. Classrooms were provided in the Technical College buildings, Ann Street, until 1914 when the school moved to lower George Street.

...in 1921 the school was to occupy the well known Normal School buildings on the corner of Adelaide and Edward Streets...At about this stage it was separated from the control of the Central Technical College and combined with the Junior High School which had been operating as a secondary department at the Normal School. The name Brisbane State High School was then first applied.

Although the school's beginning is taken as having been 1913, it was relocated to its current campus next to Musgrave Park at South Brisbane in 1925. The laying of the foundation stone of the first building of the school, Block A, took place in 1923 in the attendance of Queensland Education Minister John Huxham, and William Forgan Smith, then Queensland Minister for Public Works and later Premier. The cost of constructing Block A was estimated to be £32,443 at the time. Brisbane State High School has been a member of the GPS since the 1920s, and of the QGSSSA since 1921. Several of the school's features are listed on the Queensland Heritage Register: notably Block A (1925); Block H (1865), formerly the Brisbane South Girls and Infants School; and three mature fig trees (predating 1946).

The Brisbane State High School's first principal, Isaac Waddle, served for 24 years; he first retired in 1941 but was asked to return again by the Minister for Education, finally retiring in 1945. Waddle's successor, John Barnes, served for barely a year before dying in office, and between 1947 and 1960 the post was held by a further three principals: Herbert Watkin, Arthur Copeman and Fredrick Cafferky. During the ensuing leadership of George Lockie, the school underwent massive expansions, growing from 1091 students in 1961 to 2183 in 1967, as well as consolidating its reputation as being highly competitive amongst the private school institutions of South-East Queensland. For the 6 years from 2003 to 2008, then to 2012, the OP results consistently climbed, with 86% of students receiving an OP of 1–15 in 2008, and nearly 95% of students in 2012 received an OP of 1–15. Mr Wade Haynes, formerly an acting principal of the school in 2002, became the principal in 2011, serving for 12 years until 2023. In 2024, Greg Pierce took over as Executive Principal of Brisbane State High School.

== Principals ==
The following principals have led the school since it was opened:

- Mea. Bryden; 1913–1915
- Unspecified position from 1916 to 1919
- Isaac Waddle; 1920–1945
- J. A. Barnes; 1945–1946
- Herbert G. Watkin; 1947–1951
- A. B. Copeman; 1952–1957
- F. H. R. Cafferky; 1958–1960
- George W. Lockie; 1961–1971
- Raymond F. Fitzgerald; 1972–1981
- Colin R. Mason; 1981–1997
- David F. Sutton; 1998–2008
- Richard C. Morrison; 2009–2011
- Wade Haynes; 2011–2023
- Greg Pierce; 2024–present

== Extracurricular activities ==
=== GPS membership ===
Brisbane State High School joined the Great Public Schools' Association of Queensland in 1930, and consequently the school is able to enter competitions against other GPS schools in South East Queensland. A wide range of activities are offered in the GPS including, Australian rules football, athletics, basketball, chess, cricket, cross country, debating, rowing, rugby union, soccer, swimming, tennis, volleyball. Brisbane State High's Queensland Great Public Schools (GPS) premierships include:

=== GPS premierships ===
Activity	Premiership years
Rugby	1947, 1964, 1969, 1973, 1974, 1975, 1976, 1983, 1984, 1992, 1993, 2005, 2009, 2010, 2016
Rowing	GPS Premiership (Old Boys Cup) 1st VIII (O'Connor Cup) 1925, 1927, 1928, 1932, 1948
Swimming	1933, 1966, 1968, 1978, 1979, 1980, 1981, 1982, 1983, 1984, 1985, 1986
Basketball	1998, 1999, 2000, 2002, 2004, 2006, 2007, 2010, 2011, 2016, 2022
Tennis	1959, 1972, 1973, 1984
Cross Country	2020, 2021, 2023, 2025
Soccer	2005, 2006
Track and Field	1946, 1947, 1966, 1967, 1968, 1975, 1976, 1977, 1978, 1979, 1980, 1981, 1982, 1983, 1984, 1985, 1986, 1987, 1988, 1989
Cricket	1949, 1966, 1977, 1979, 1992, 1993, 2002
Volleyball	
Debating	2024, 2025, 2026

=== Rugby ===
In 2009, the BSHS first XV rugby union team went undefeated in the season scoring a total of 405 points for (50.63 per game) and conceding a total of 85 points against (10.63 per game) from 8 season game. The team broke the GPS record when the school beat Brisbane Grammar School 103–0. The match was soon abandoned when the referee called for the use of the 'surrender rule' with 7 minutes still permitted to play. This First XV has been regarded by many as the best GPS rugby team in Australia from this decade. Two other players are representing the Australian A School boys team. This equalled the feats of the class of 2007, when two players represented the Australian schoolboys Rugby Union team while two others represented Australia A. Another two boys represented the Australian schoolboys rugby league team.

=== QGSSSA sport ===
A wide range of sporting and other similar activities are offered Queensland Girls' Secondary Schools' Sports Association competitions, including Australian rules football, athletics, badminton, basketball, cricket, cross country, rowing, soccer, swimming, tennis, volleyball, rhythmic gymnastics, field hockey, netball, softball, touch football, waterpolo, and fencing.

=== QGSSSA premierships ===
The schools has won premierships in a number of sports.

Activity	Premiership years
Athletics	1966, 1967, 1968, 1971, 1972, 1973, 1974, 1975, 1976, 1977, 1978, 1979, 1980, 1981, 1982, 1983, 1984, 1985, 1986, 1987, 1988, 1989, 1991, 1993, 1994, 2000, 2001, 2012, 2014, 2015
Badminton	2001, 2002, 2003, 2009, 2010, 2015, 2016, 2020
Basketball	1993, 2007, 2009, 2010, 2011, 2012, 2013, 2014, 2015, 2016, 2017, 2018
Cricket	1990, 2000, 2003, 2004, 2005, 2007, 2009, 2012, 2014, 2015 (10 different years up 2018)
Cross Country	1999, 2000, 2014, 2015, 2016, 2017, 2018, 2019 (8 different years up to 2019)
Gymnastics (Artistic)	
Gymnastics (Rhythmic)	2019
Hockey	1922, 1934, 1935, 1937, 1938, 1940, 1941, 1964, 1965, 1966, 1968, 1969, 1970, 1971, 1975, 1977, 1978, 1979, 1980, 1981, 1983, 1984, 1989, 1991, 1994, 1995, 1996, 1997, 1999, 2000, 2001, 2004, 2005, 2008, 2009, 2014, 2015, 2016, 2017, 2018, 2019
Netball	1931, 1932, 1935, 1938, 1939, 1941, 1943, 1944, 1960, 1961, 1963, 1964, 1965, 1967, 1968, 1969, 1970, 1971, 1973, 1974, 1975, 1976, 1978, 1980, 1983, 1984, 1989, 1991, 1995, 2012, 2013, 2017
Soccer (Football)	2000, 2002, 2003, 2004, 2005, 2007, 2008, 2009, 2010, 2011, 2012, 2015, 2017
Softball	1968, 1969, 1970, 1971, 1972, 1973, 1974, 1975, 1977, 1978, 1979, 1980, 1982, 1983, 1984, 1985, 1986, 1987, 1988, 1989, 1990, 1991, 1993, 1994, 1995, 2009, 2010, 2011, 2012, 2013, 2014, 2016, 2017, 2018
Swimming	1923, 1962, 1963, 1967, 1968, 1969, 1970, 1971, 1976, 1977, 1978, 1979, 1980, 1981, 1982, 1983, 1984, 1990, 1991, 1992, 1993, 1995
Tennis	1969, 1975, 1976, 1977, 1978, 1979, 1980, 1981, 1982, 1983, 1985, 1999, 2004, 2014
Touch Football	2005, 2006, 2009, 2010, 2013, 2014, 2017, 2018
Volleyball	1974, 1984, 1985, 1994, 2011, 2013, 2016, 2019

=== Cultural ===
==== Performing arts ====
The school's Instrumental Music programme was established in 1975 and caters for about 20% of the school population. There are numerous strings orchestras: Southbank, Merivale, Cordelia, Kurilpa and Symphony Orchestras. There are also multiple wind bands: Wind Ensemble, Concert Band, Concert Winds, Wind Orchestra, and Symphonic Band. In addition to these, students can participate in many chamber groups and secondary ensembles including Stage Band, Big Band, Percussion Ensembles, Flute Ensembles, Brass Ensembles.

Brisbane State High School ensembles have been grand finalists in the Creative Generation Instrumental Fanfare every year since 2006, and winning the Erica Brindley Memorial Trophy in 2006, 2012, 2014 and 2022.

In 2021, the Bellissima choir was a grand finalist in the Creative Generation Choral Fanfare. In 2022, to celebrate its centenary, the school presented Timeless—an original production—at the Queensland Performing Arts Centre.

The school has a high-achieving Dance Troupes program. As of 2026, there are six troupes: Junior and Senior Dance Troupes (specialising in jazz, contemporary and musical theatre dance), Junior and Senior Hip Hop Crews, Bollywood Troupe and Tap Troupe. These teams compete in eisteddfods around Queensland and perform at school events such as State High Day and the annual BSHS Dance Showcase. Students are also encouraged to extend their skills in choreography, with frequent opportunities presenting themselves through School Productions, Dance Troupes, in class, and more.

==== Debating ====
Brisbane State High School has been involved in the GPS, Queensland Debating Union (QDU), and Brisbane Girls' Debating Association competitions. In 2024, the Brisbane State High School Senior A team won their first GPS Debating premiership (shared with Brisbane Grammar School), making them the fourth school in the history of the competition to achieve this title. In 2025 the Senior A team won the school their second premiership, and first sole premiership in the competition with a historic undefeated run in the Senior A GPS competition. In 2026 they won their third premiership, and second sole premiership in a row.

== Campus ==
=== The main campus ===
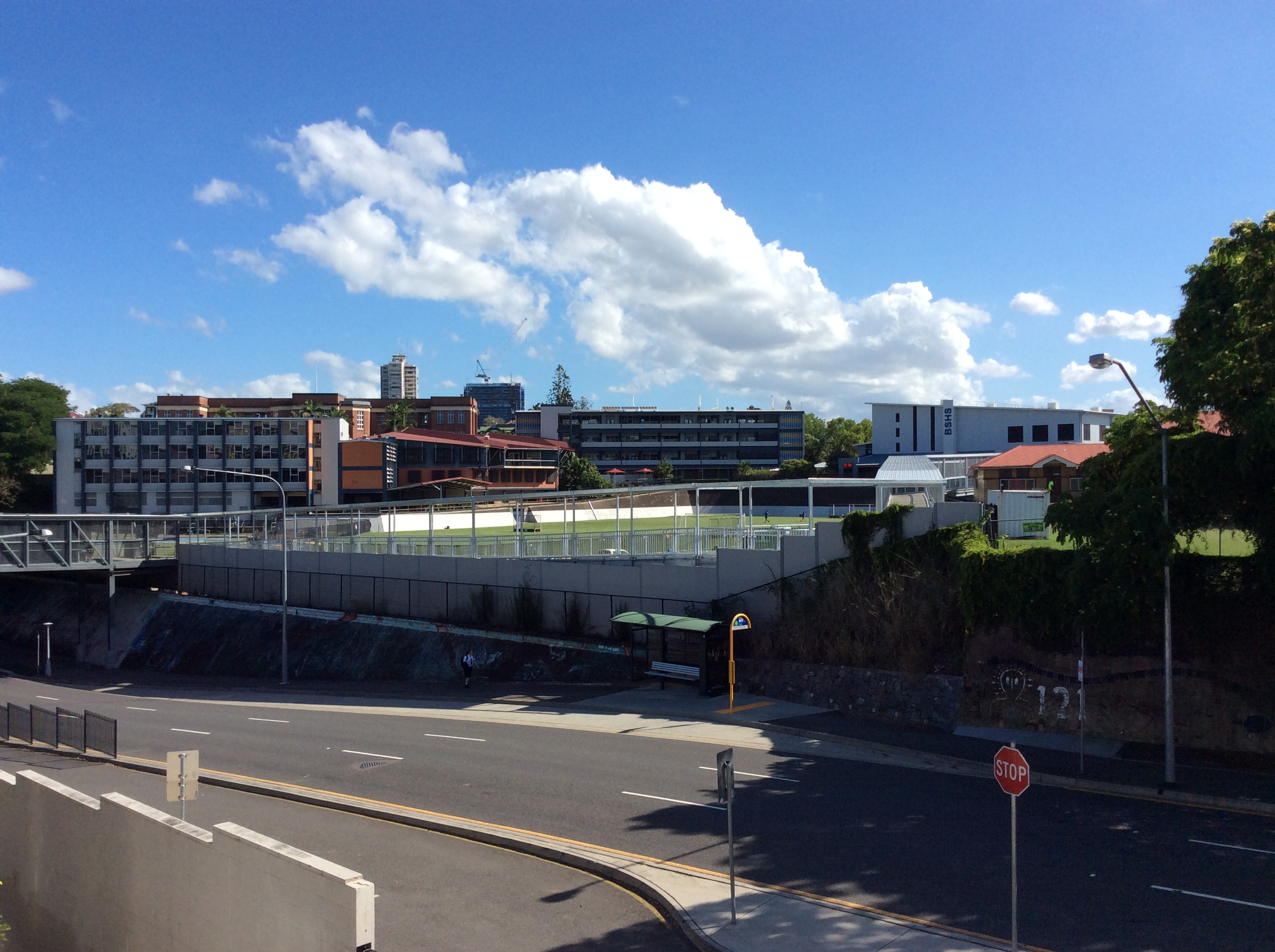
A shot of the Upper Campus from the newly built I Block

Two main campuses possessing a variety of architectural styles dominate the school's layout. The Upper Campus is the site of the school's original building and central administrative block constructed in 1920s brick architecture. The upper quadrangle extends out from this building with the library and the two storey computer block forming frontal wings. In addition, the Upper Campus houses the mathematics rooms, the science laboratories, the manual arts complex, sports facility, tennis courts and oval. An overpass walkway connects the Upper and Lower Campuses. H Block in the Lower Campus was constructed in 1864 as part of the South Brisbane Primary School and is a heritage-listed school building. J Block is predominantly used by the humanities department and the languages department, and M Block serves as a secondary administrative block, whilst the neighbouring K Block (demolished October 2009) was home to the performing arts. The space upon which it once stood is in the process of being converted into a formal entrance and car park. In 2008/09, massive redevelopment projects totaling $20.5 million saw the performing arts block moved to a new and larger facility at the other end of the Lower Campus. The gym within the sports complex is planned to be redeveloped within the next 4 years.

==== The Link Bridge ====
The Link Bridge links the Merivale and Vulture Street Campuses.

The Old Link Bridge still exists to this very day and is used as an overpass for the general public.

The Current link bridge was built in 2009 and was extended in 2015 when I Block was opened.

=== Fursden Road playing fields ===
Brisbane State High maintains additional sporting facilities, with theirs located at Carina, about 7 kilometres (4.3 mi) from the Brisbane CBD. 5 playing fields as well as change rooms and a canteen comprise the campus. Cricket, rugby and football are large users of the facilities, with games taking place on weekends and on various afternoons. A master plan has been put forward for a large development of Fursden Road which would include a new grandstand. It is believed that work on the development will commence in the next few years.

=== West End rowing sheds ===
The school maintains rowing sheds on the West End Reach of the Brisbane River, within close proximity of the rowing sheds of other GPS and BSRA (Brisbane SchoolGirls Rowing Association) member schools. Rowing boats, dingies and other necessary equipment are stored at the sheds and it is on that and other reaches of the river that training for the annual Head of the River rowing competition takes place.

== House structure ==
Rather than being named after past students, the Houses are named in honour of army generals from the First World War.

House	Colour	Name Origin
Allenby	Blue	Named after Viscount Edmund Allenby (1861–1936). British field marshal notable for commanding the Egyptian Expeditionary Force in the conquest of Palestine and Syria during the First World War.
Birdwood	Red	Named after Field Marshal William Riddell Birdwood (1865–1951). British soldier who served in the Boer War and was known later on for providing overall command of the "Australian and New Zealand Army Corps" (ANZAC) throughout the battles of the Gallipoli Peninsula in the First World War.
Glasgow	Gold	Named after Major-General Sir William Glasgow (1876–1955), a senior Australian officer at Gallipoli in 1915 who went on to command the First A.I.F Division with distinction in battles on the Somme as well as the final offensive of August 1918.
Monash	Green	Named after General Sir John Monash (1865–1931). Served in the Gallipoli Campaign and later on in Flanders, commanding Australian forces at Messines Ridge, Passchendaele and in the battles of the Hindenburg Line.

== School Council ==
Brisbane State High School has a School Council by reason of it being an Independent Public School, a class of school existing in Queensland. The Council monitors the school's progress in the implementation of its policies and assists the Principal in setting the school's strategic direction. Its members include representatives of the teaching staff, students, and the parents of students.

== Past Students' Association ==
The Brisbane State High School Past Students' Association was formed in 1921, originally in two discrete entities as the Old Boys' and Old Girls' Associations. It now operates as an amalgamated body. The association's newsletter, Amicus, is mailed four times annually to all members. Contributions to projects geared towards promoting the tradition and spirit of the school are some of its primary functions. The current patron of the association is the school's twelfth Executive Principal, Mr Greg Pierce.

== School museum ==
Founded in 1996 as a gift from that year's departing seniors, the museum contains documents, photographs and other memorabilia charting the school from its inception to its recent past. School badges and blazers from the 1920s and 1930s as well as originals of every school magazine are housed in the museum.

== Notable alumni ==
The school has produced many notable alumni, including Bill Hayden and Wally Lewis, as well as 36 Olympic athletes.

== See also ==
- Education in Australia
- Lists of schools in Queensland
