= St Hilda's School =

School in Queensland, Australia

Location
- Southport, Queensland; Australia; 27°58′09″S 153°24′25″E

Information
- Type: Independent single-sex early learning, primary and secondary day and boarding school
- Motto: Latin: Non nobis solum (Not for Ourselves Alone)
- Denomination: Anglicanism
- Established: 1912; 114 years ago
- Chairman: Catherine O'Sullivan
- Principal: Amanda Shuttlewood (Acting 2023)
- Staff: ~246
- Enrolment: ~1,250 (Pre–Prep to 12)
- Colours: Red, yellow and blue
- Brother school: The Southport School
- Website: sthildas.qld.edu.au

St Hilda's School is an independent, Anglican, day and boarding school for girls, located in Southport, a central suburb of the Gold Coast, Queensland, Australia.

Established in 1912, St Hilda's has a non-selective enrolment policy and currently caters for approximately 1,250 students from Pre-Preparatory to Year 12, including 160 full and weekly boarders from Years 6 to 12. St Hilda's is the only girls' school in the Gold Coast region. Its brother school is The Southport School (TSS), also located in Southport, and the only boys' boarding school in the region.

The school is a member of the Queensland Girls' Secondary Schools Sports Association (QGSSSA), the Alliance of Girls' Schools Australia (AGSA), the Junior School Heads Association of Australia (JSHAA), the Association of Heads of Independent Schools of Australia (AHISA), and the Australian Boarding Schools' Association.

== History ==
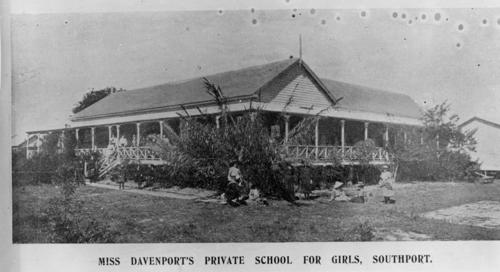
Goyte-Lea, Miss Davenport's Private School for Girls, 1905

St Hilda's School was founded in 1912, when the Diocese of Brisbane of the Anglican Church of Australia purchased an older school, Goyte-Lea, from Miss Davenport. Goyte-Lea was established prior to Federation of Australia in the late 19th century. The school was named after the seventh century Abbess of Whitby Saint Hilda. Saint Hilda was said to have turned serpents into stone, and three stone serpents are the emblem of the school's crest.

The school's first headmistress was Catherine Bourne, for whom a series of classrooms are named. The school's motto since establishment is Non nobis solum, Latin for "Not for Ourselves Alone".

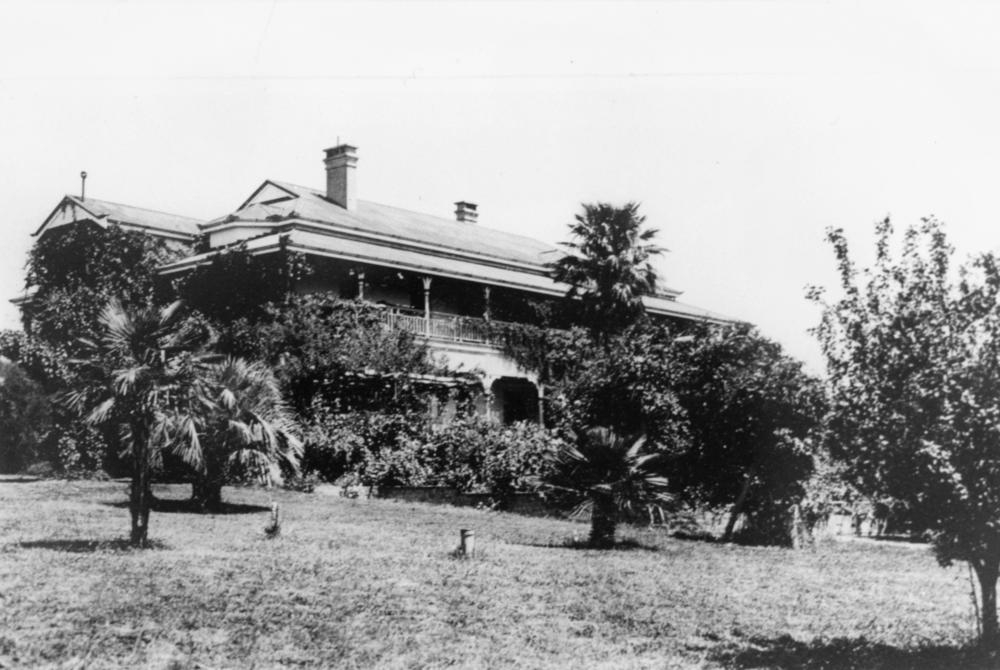
Pikedale Homestead (destroyed by fire in 1963)

Although always a girls' school, St Hilda's does have 'old boys'. During the Second World War, secondary schools were used as army barracks. In March 1942, St Hilda's evacuated 90 boarders to Pikedale homestead near Stanthorpe. The Anglican Church relocated boys from the Church of England Boys' School in Toowoomba (now Toowoomba Anglican School), to St Hilda's in April 1942, while St Hildas was also used for a short time by the 135th Medical Regiment. The school returned from Pikedale to Southport in December 1943.

From 2006 until 2016, Peter Crawley served as the first male principal of the school.

== Campus ==
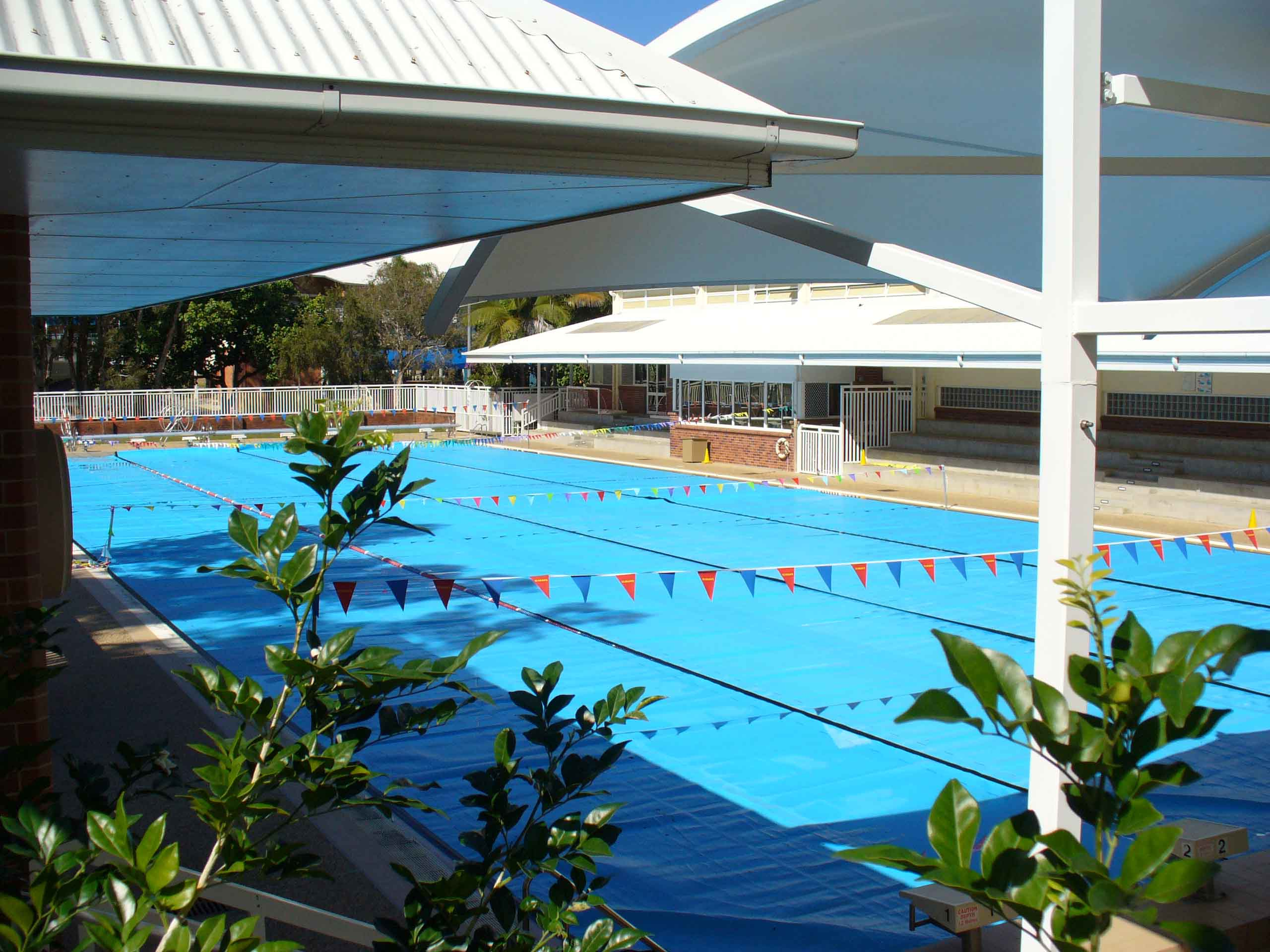
St Hilda's School pool

St Hilda's is situated on a single, 14 hectares (35 acres) campus, featuring gardens and bushland, at Southport, located one hour's drive south of Brisbane on Australia's Gold Coast. The school comprises a primary school (Pre-Preparatory to Year 6), middle school (Years 7 to 9) and senior school (Years 10 to 12). The whole school is on the one grounds, although the primary school is separate from the middle and senior schools. The middle and senior schools share facilities and teaching staff. The school has two libraries, the Junior School Library and Senior School Library, as well as IT facilities.

Built in 1995, the St Hilda's School Sports complex features indoor courts suitable for basketball, netball, badminton, and volleyball; a fitness gym; an artistic and rhythmic gymnastics area including a foam pit, balance beams and vaulting horse; and a 50m heated outdoor swimming pool. The school also has one oval and outdoor tennis and netball courts. The school previously owned hockey fields opposite the Gold Coast Hospital but this land was sold and is now developed as part of the redevelopment of the Gold Coast Hospital precinct.

== House system ==
As with most Australian schools, St Hilda's uses a [house system] to facilitate in-school competition in sporting and cultural events. A highlight of this competition is the Inter-House Musicals which are held at the Gold Coast Arts Centre. Other competitions include the Inter-House Athletics carnival, Inter-House Cross-Country, Inter-House Swimming carnival, Inter-House Drama Festival and Inter-House Debating.

The school's houses are named after Australian plants. In the middle and senior schools, the houses are Banksia, Melaleuca and Karragaroo. The corresponding junior school houses are Acacia, Tristania and Grevillea.

== Co-curriculum ==
=== Sport ===
St Hilda's is a member of the Queensland Girls' Secondary Schools Sports Association (QGSSSA) and the Andrews Cup, the only such school on the Gold Coast. Members of sporting teams travel to areas throughout South East Queensland to participate in sporting events.

== Student Exchange Program ==
St Hilda's participates in a Student Exchange Program with a number of schools in the United States of America, England, New Zealand, Scotland, Canada, and South Africa. About 40 students, in Year 10, participate in the program each year. They travel to the exchange schools for a six-week period.

== Notable alumnae ==
- Lauren Brant – television personality, singer, dancer and actress
- Kimberley Joseph – actress
- Amira Karroum – Australian jihadist killed in Syrian Civil War
- Elise Kellond-Knight – soccer player
- Emma Snowsill – triathlete

== See also ==
- List of schools in Gold Coast, Queensland
- Anglican education in Australia
- List of boarding schools in Australia
