= History of state education in Queensland =

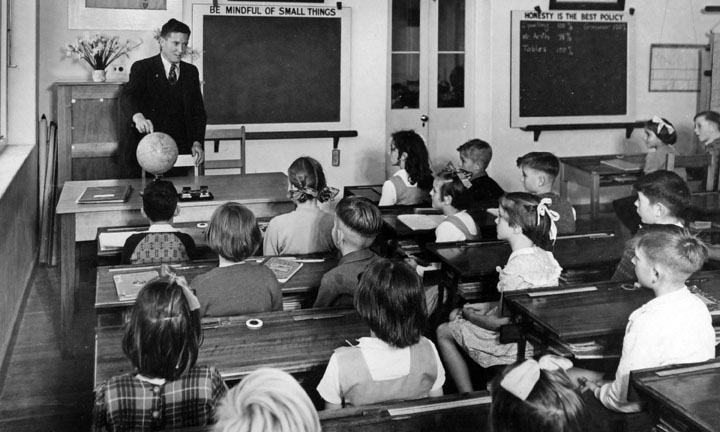
Classroom in Kelvin Grove State School, 1951

The history of state education in Queensland commences with the Moreton Bay penal settlement of New South Wales in Australia, which became the responsibility of the Queensland Government after the Separation of Queensland from New South Wales in 1859.

== Primary education ==
=== New South Wales ===
In 1826 the first primary school was conducted in Brisbane, then the Moreton Bay penal settlement of New South Wales, by Esther Roberts, a soldier's wife. Although her stipend of £10 was drawn from the funds of the New South Wales colonial government, her school was actually administered by the Anglican Church because in those days it was generally believed that it was the duty of the Church to conduct schools. After a succession of teachers, mostly soldiers, the school was closed in 1842 with the closure of the penal settlement in favour of opening the district for free settlement.

Almost all of the schools in the early free settlement period were short-lived. Many were private establishments in front parlours, with a few boarders and day students. Fees and pretensions to gentility were high; standards seem to have been low. In 1845 the first Roman Catholic school was opened by Michael Bourke, thus beginning a pattern of small denominational schools which provided education of a sort for almost 20 years in Brisbane. Many children in the Moreton Bay District, however, went without any formal education.

In 1848 the Governor of New South Wales, Charles Augustus FitzRoy, appointed a Board of National Education to undertake the task of creating government schools similar to the National Schools in Ireland. This was a response to the problem of providing an efficient system of elementary education for a scattered population of different religious denominations, without seriously antagonising those denominations. As a compromise, the New South Wales National Schools offered secular subjects and non-denominational scripture lessons and allowed visiting clergy to provide religious instruction during school hours to the children of those parents who desired it. A Denominational Board, appointed a day after the National Board, did not exercise much supervisory power. Its major function was to distribute funds to the four existing systems of church schools.

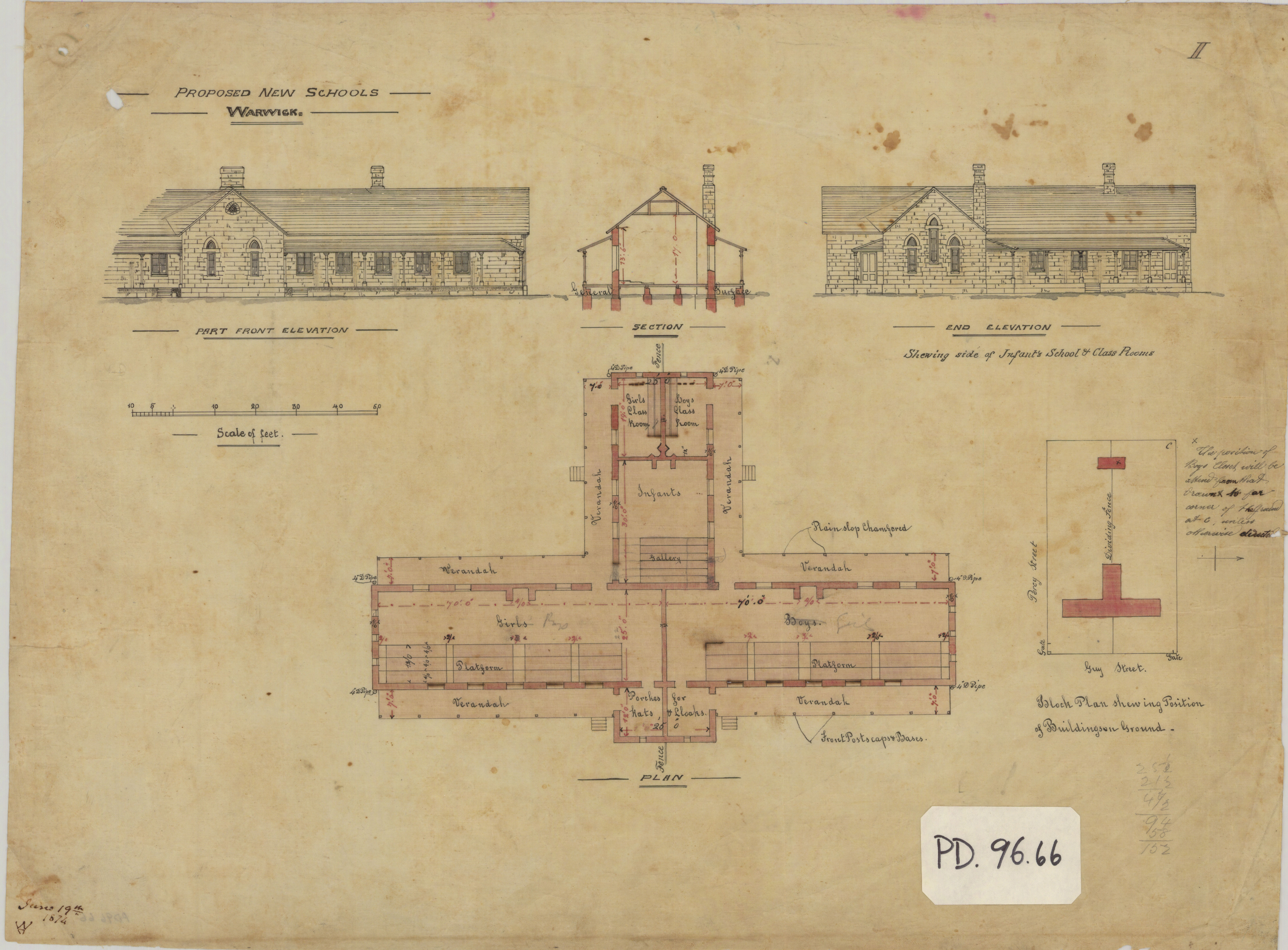
Architectural plans for Warwick Central School

The National Board established and administered schools where parents contributed a third of the total building costs and guaranteed an average attendance of at least 30 pupils. The parents also had to pay school fees which formed part of the teacher's salary paid by the Board. The curriculum consisted of reading, writing, grammar, geography, object lessons (including biography, nature studies and elementary mechanics), scripture lessons and, in the final year, mathematics (algebra and geometry) or Latin. The reading books were the Irish National Readers which had no Australian content.

Four National schools were established in Queensland: Warwick (opened in 1850), Drayton (opened in 1851), Brisbane Boys and Brisbane Girls (both opened in 1860).

=== Early Queensland ===
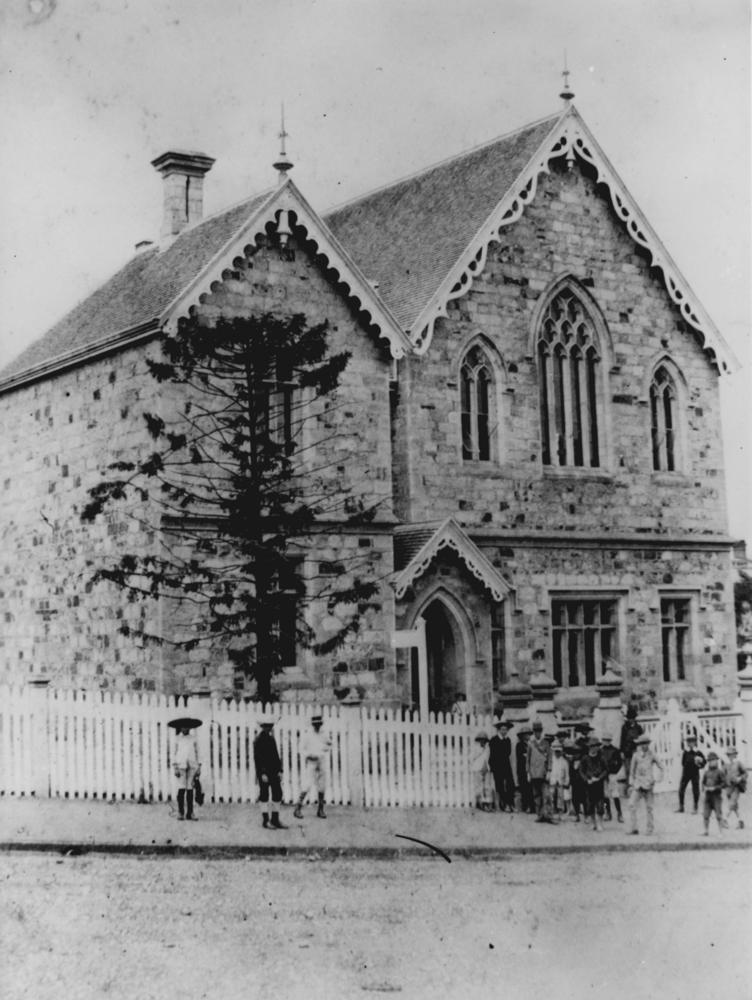
Brisbane Normal School, circa 1885

Queensland was declared a separate colony from New South Wales on 10 December 1859 and in the following year the Queensland Parliament faced the task of providing an education system for the new colony. They provided a Board of General Education which combined the functions of the National and Denominational Boards of New South Wales. The new Board acquired the four National schools from New South Wales and had the authority to establish and administer primary schools vested in the Board under similar conditions to those applied by the New South Wales National Board. The new board also paid the salaries of teachers in non-vested schools, nearly all of which were established and administered by churches. By stipulating certain conditions for the payment of these salaries, the Board of General Education exercised close supervision over the non-vested schools.

The curriculum provided by vested schools was the same as that provided by the earlier National schools but clergy wishing to give religious instruction were expected to attend before or after school hours, a practice which made such instruction unpopular with many parents. In 1862 a new building, designated the Brisbane Normal School was erected within the grounds of the Brisbane Boys and Brisbane Girls Primary Schools. Margaret Berry was the head of Brisbane Normal Girls Primary School and the Brisbane Normal Boys School was separate. The most important function of the Normal Schools was that they were also training centres where pupil-teachers could see the best and most efficient teaching methods in operation.

The pupil-teacher system was a cheap form of recruitment, though perhaps a little hard on the pupils and teachers involved. Children as young as 14 were enlisted as apprentices, working as class teachers during the school day and receiving their teacher training before and after school. Pupil-teachers at the Normal School were well trained, but only a fraction of Queensland's teacher needs could be met in this way. The training system was therefore modified to allow head teachers of other schools to train pupil-teachers, thus relieving the pressure on the Brisbane centre.

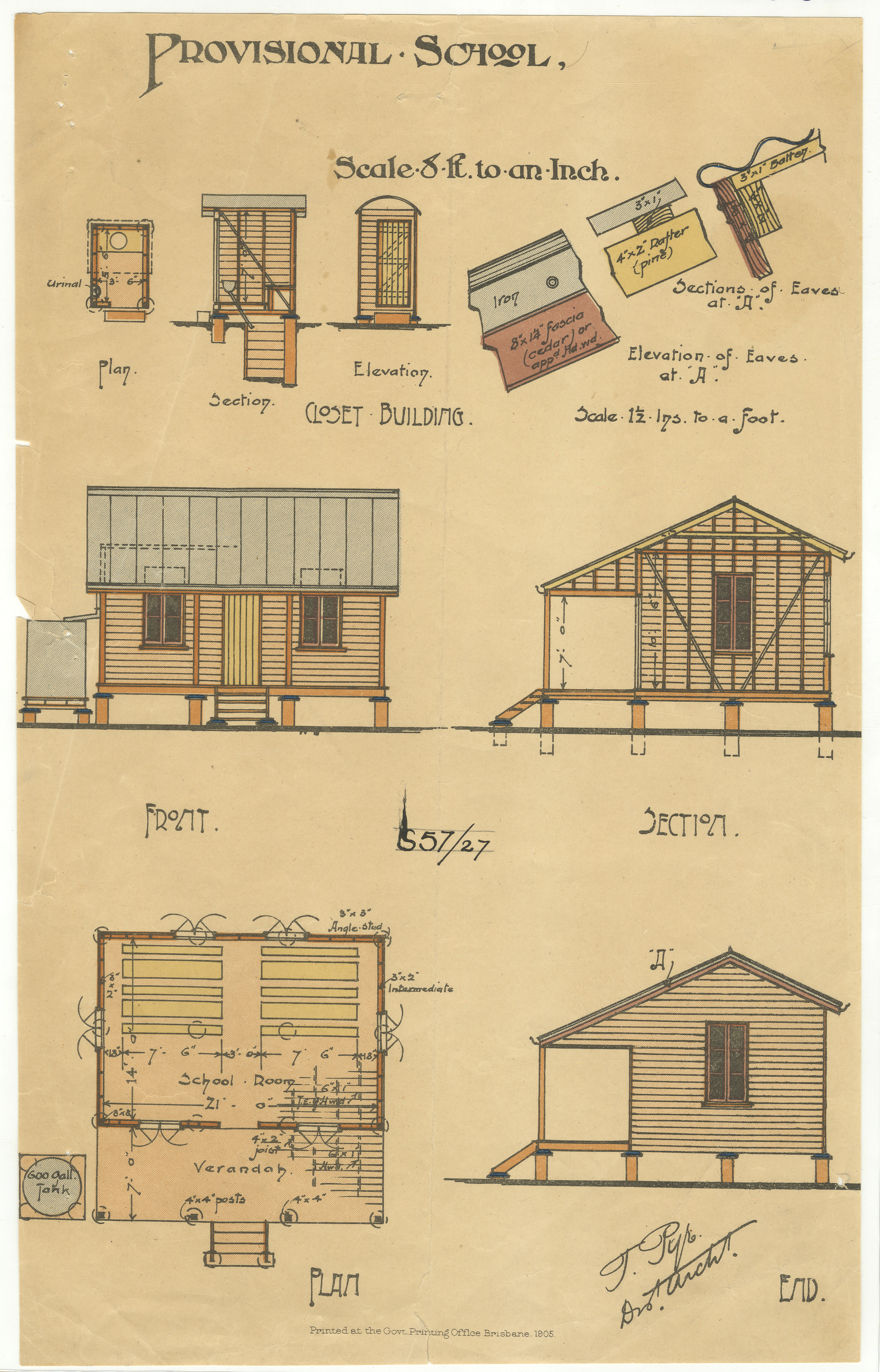
Architectural drawing of a Provisional School

In 1869 the board provided provisional schools. These represented one of the earliest efforts to tackle a perennial problem of Queensland education - how to provide basic education to a scattered population with a limited education budget. Because they could be opened with as few as 15 children (reduced later to 12), provisional schools were a means of providing education in areas where the expense of a full state school was unjustified, or where the local people were unable to raise the necessary contributions towards a state school. The local people were responsible for providing a suitable building, and provisional school buildings were often of a very low standard. Moreover, teachers' salaries were low, and their standards of training correspondingly poor. As their name implies, provisional schools were intended as a temporary expedient which would eventually be replaced by standard state schools. Sometimes, when a locality prospered into a large, stable settlement, this happened; often, however, the provisional school withered away as population shifted, the gold played out or the railway moved further west.

Another significant advance came in 1870 when the payment of fees to National schools was abolished. There seems to have been little regularity in the amount or collection of fees which could be as high as one shilling per week per child. Although fees certainly augmented the meagre salaries of some teachers, their collection seems to have resulted in irregular attendance by the students.

By the 1870s, Queensland was experiencing a wave of prosperity brought on by gold rushes and the start of the mineral boom. Queensland was invigorated with a sense of democracy and national purpose, leading to the State Education Act 1875 which provided the following initiatives:

- Primary education for children aged from 6 to 12 was to be compulsory. (This provision was not fully implemented until 1900.)
- Education was to be secular, i.e. under the control of the Queensland Government. (In conformity with this policy, all assistance to non-vested schools was withdrawn in 1880. This provision occasioned considerable ill-feeling among Roman Catholics and some Anglicans.)
- Primary education was to be free.
- A Department of Public Instruction was established to administer the Act.

The architects of the act were Charles Lilley and Samuel Griffith, two of the most astute leaders in the young colony.

=== Department of Public Instruction ===
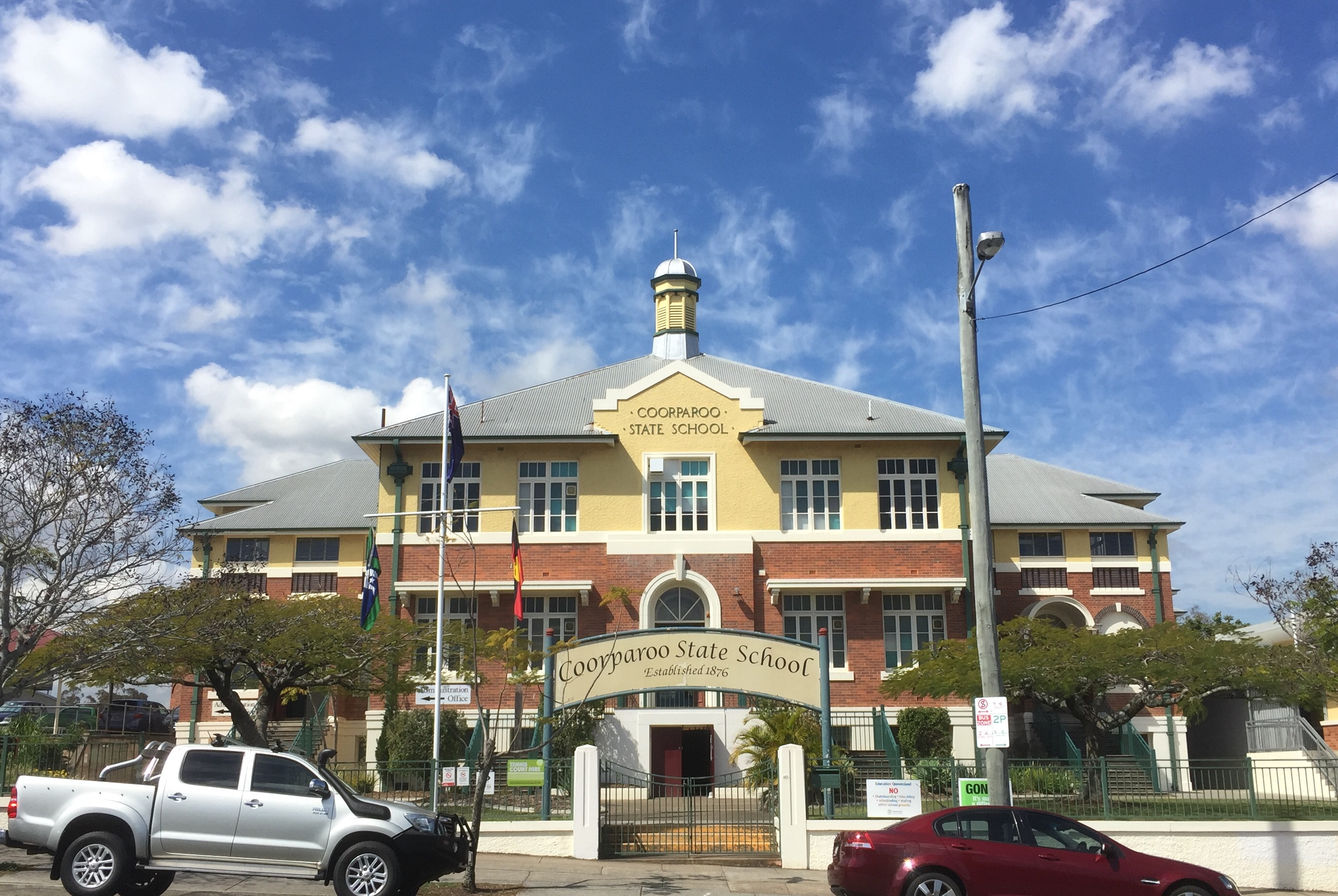
Coorparoo State School, established 1876

Closer settlement in Queensland progressed rapidly in the 1880s and 1890s and, consequently, the number of schools rose from 231 in 1875 to 911 in 1900. This situation strained the colony's limited education budget and created problems of inadequate teacher supply and training, a proliferation of poorly designed and equipped provisional schools, and a perennial teacher housing problem in rural areas. These problems, however, should be kept in perspective: despite the difficulties, colonial educators achieved a remarkable feat in bring basic literacy to most Queensland children by 1900.

Though a number of highly qualified teachers were imported from Britain in the 1880s, the pupil-teacher system was the main method of recruiting and training teachers. Not until 1914, when a teacher training college was established in Brisbane, was it possible to upgrade the standard of teacher preparation beyond the level of the pupil-teacher system, which was phased out between 1923 and 1935. Moreover, the disproportionate number of provisional schools in the colonial period helped keep the overall standard of buildings and teaching down. In 1908 there were 640 of these essentially makeshift schools compared with only 461 state schools. A significant development came in 1909 when the minimum attendance required for a state school was reduced from 30 to 12. This led to the reclassification of large numbers of provisional schools as state schools, and meant that new districts applying for a school were more likely to be granted a state school. Consequently, in 1909 there were 1059 state schools and only 79 provisional schools in Queensland.

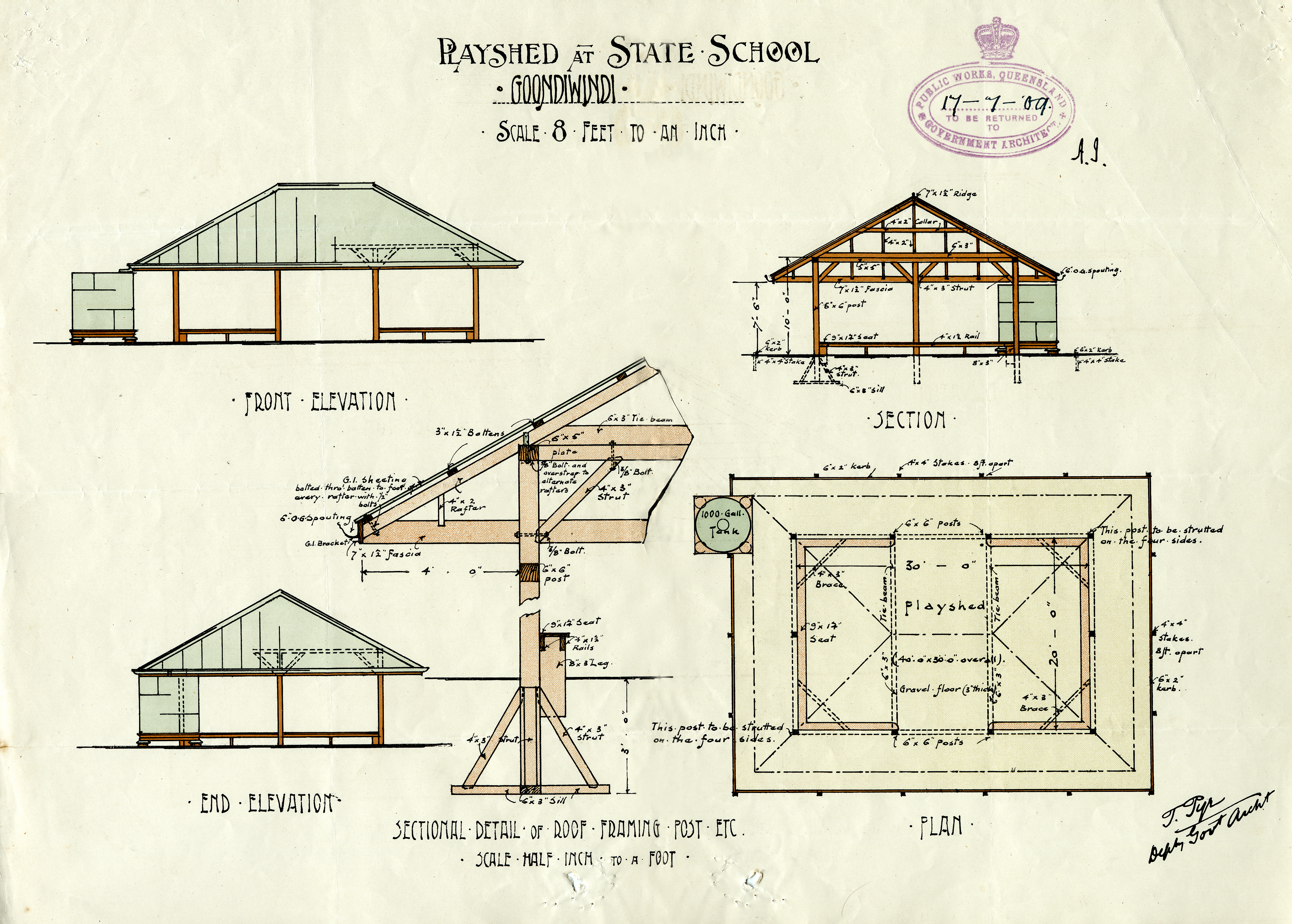
Design for the play shed at Goondiwindi State School, 1909

The basis of the colonial curriculum was the three Rs (reading, writing and arithmetic). In addition, object lessons (show and tell lessons), drill and gymnastics, and vocal music were supposed to be taught, but in practice these relatively new subjects were often ignored or poorly taught. Geography, needlework, grammar, history and mechanics were also included in the curriculum at various levels. While some of these subjects were included for their practical usefulness, the main criterion for inclusion of subjects in the curriculum was not their practical value, but their value in disciplining ("sharpening") mental faculties such as memory and reasoning.

The influence of this mental discipline concept on the curriculum was receding by the 1890s. Such subjects as agriculture and domestic economy were introduced as part of object lessons, and the introduction of Arbor Day in 1890 also reflected a growing concern for the utility of the knowledge and values imparted in schools. By 1905, when important syllabus changes were made, the value of subjects was increasingly assessed in terms of their everyday usefulness, and "learning by doing" was stressed. The child rather than the teacher, was becoming the centre of the learning process, at least in theory. These changes in the philosophy of education, combined with attempts to mould the content and methods of teaching to the peculiar geographic conditions of Queensland, were major influences on education for the next six decades.

A major consequence of these trends was the increasing emphasis on vocational subjects such as manual training and agriculture. This reflects not only the new educational ideas, but also the idea held by many educators that economic growth was essential to the progress and strength of Queensland. In 1905, for example, nature study was included in the curriculum. This subject included elements of agriculture, botany and biology. Then in 1910 a teacher of agriculture was appointed to travel among the schools. This teacher's work laid a basis for the project club system developed after 1923. In addition, in 1917 the Rural School concept was introduced at Nambour State School. In this new type of vocational school, boys were taught manual skills, elementary agriculture and farm management, while girls were taught home management and needlework skills. Rural Schools remained an important part of the education system till the 1960s.

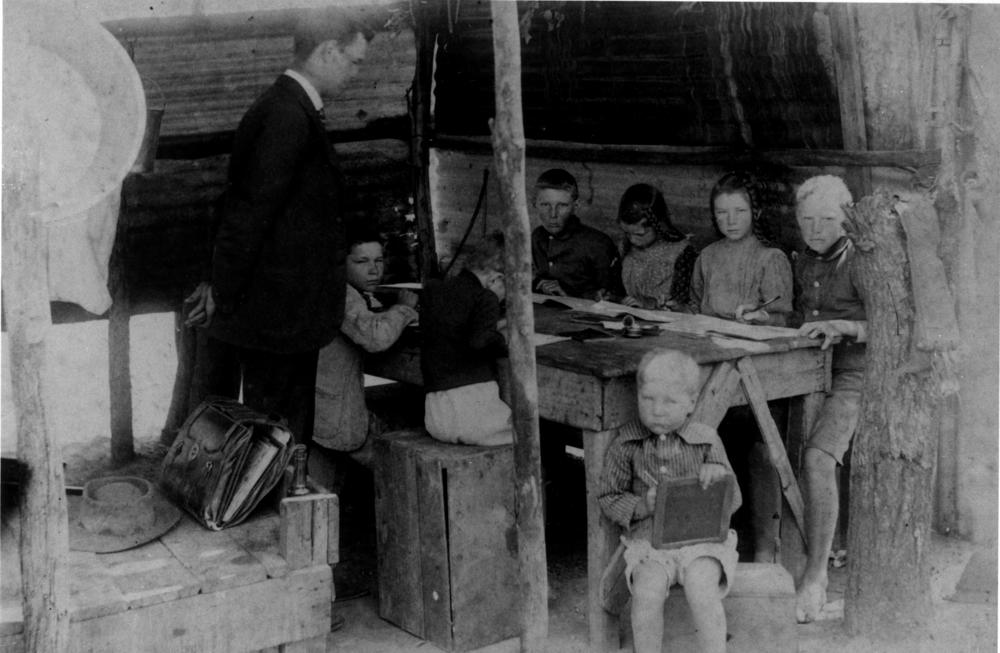
Frederick William Hodgens, itinerant teacher in the Tambo-Adavale area, 1910-1914

Attempts to solve this problem of distance constituted another important trend in the new century. Distance had always been a major factor inhibiting the spread of schooling. To help overcome this problem, the Department implemented an itinerant teacher scheme between 1901 and 1932. Itinerant teachers travelled over the isolated areas of Outback Queensland to bring books and a few hours of schooling to the children of isolated settlers and pastoral workers, but few of these teachers were able to visit families more than three times a year. With the improvement of postal facilities, the Department gradually replaced the work of the itinerant teacher by the more efficient services of the Primary Correspondence School, founded in 1922. This school reached its peak during World War II, when it was serving both isolated children and those whose schools had been closed in the national emergency. In another attempt to overcome the problem of distance, travelling domestic science and manual training railway cars were introduced in 1923 and 1925 respectively. These were in operation until 1967.

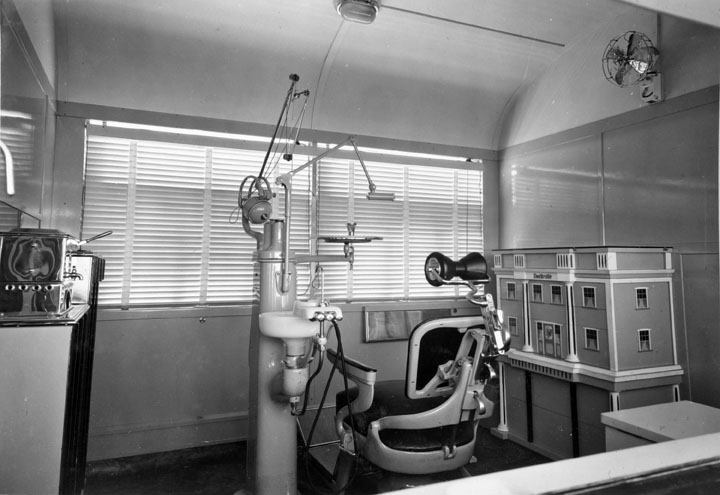
Railcar dental clinic, 1945

Increasing emphasis on school services in the 1900s reflected a concern for the "whole child". After 1907 attempts were made to combat the widespread western Queensland problem of ophthalmia (an eye inflammation known locally as blight) and in 1911 a Medical Branch of the Department, staffed by travelling doctors, dentists and ophthalmologists was created. In later years, railcars were fitted out for use by these people.

One of the major influences in this period was the external Scholarship examination. This was initially designed to provide an opportunity for secondary education for a limited number of academically gifted students. Subsequently, the provision of scholarships was widened to include the majority of those who sat for the examination. By the 1950s many educationists felt that this Scholarship examination was hampering necessary educational reforms.

The period of the Great Depression imposed financial strains on primary education. As part of a general austerity drive, building programs were retarded and teachers' salaries were cut. World War II, which followed immediately on the heels of the depression, then created staff shortages. Unfortunately, there was to be no return to the pre-war arrangements for education after 1945. Once the effects of the post-war baby boom began to be felt in the 1950s, classroom crowding and staff shortages remained endemic.

=== Department of Education ===
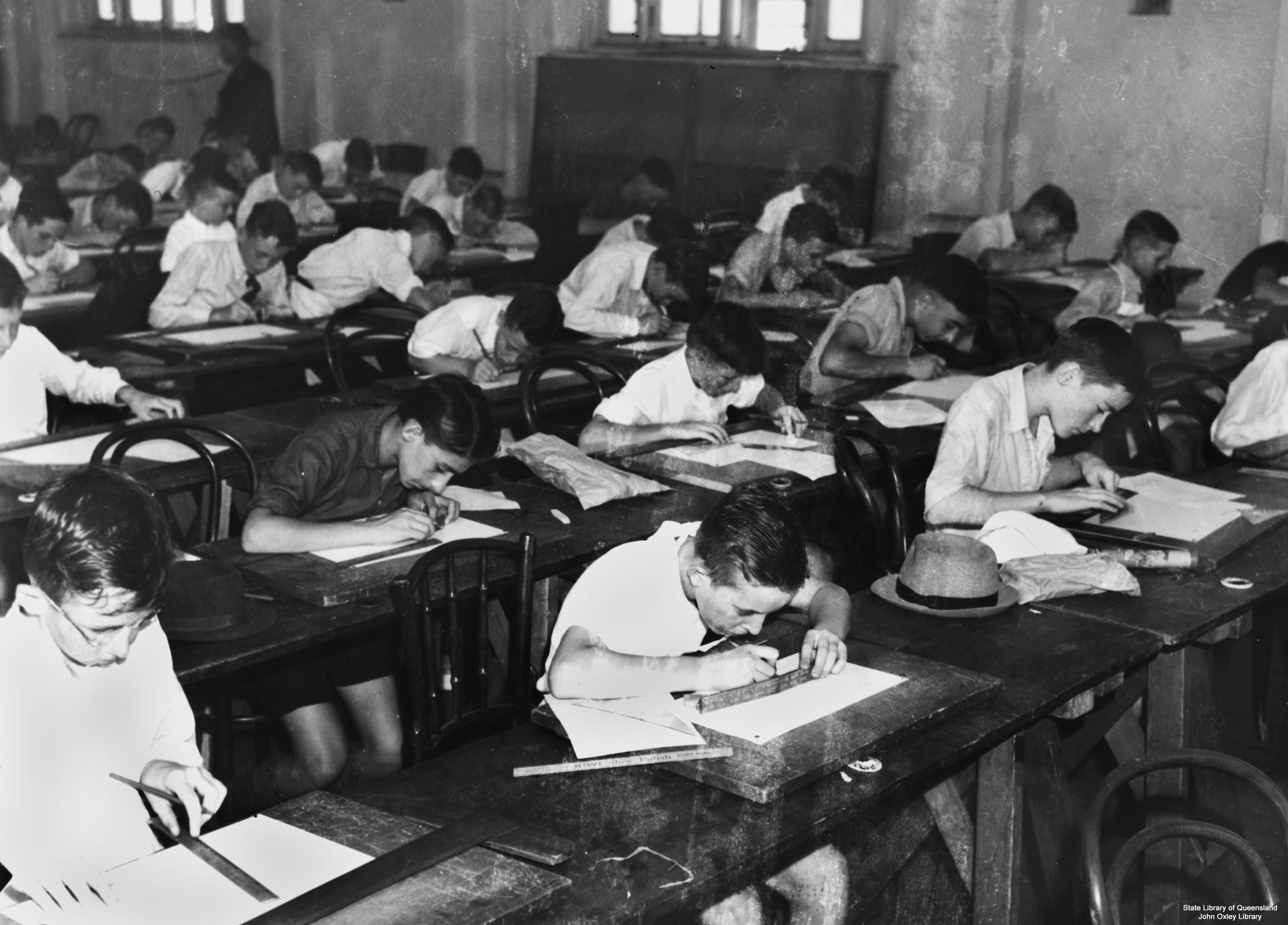
School children doing scholarship examinations, 1940

Until 1963, the endpoint of primary education in Queensland was the Scholarship examination, which selected students for entry into a secondary school. Particularly from the 1930s, this examination came under increasing criticism. Many educators believed that because some teachers treated Scholarship passes as their main goal, the examination unduly restricted the content and methods of primary education. Others felt that the examination limited the opportunities of many children to receive a secondary education. In the late 1950s and early 1960s increasingly rapid social change encouraged the Department to free schools from the bonds of the Scholarship examination, and the Government's plan, after 1957, to make secondary education freely available to all children removed the need for the examination.

The abolition of the Scholarship examination in 1963, and the passage of the State Education Act 1964 which replaced the 1875 act and its amendments, marked the beginning of a new age in primary education. An extensive revision of the syllabuses was carried out, with new syllabuses introduced in mathematics (developed in 1966–68 and again in 1974–76), science (1966 and 1975–76), language arts (1974–75), social studies (1970–71), art (1972), health and physical education (1972) and music (1974).

These programs reflected the new spirit in primary education. They gave the teacher a statement of the general aims of education, a statement of subject aims, and a basic syllabus structure, but did not, as in the past, force schools into a uniform mould. Within the guidelines provided by the programs, teachers were permitted greater flexibility in planning learning experiences for their pupils.

This greater freedom created a need for the extension of support, supervision and evaluation mechanisms, and the development of these mechanisms was a major trend in the 1970s. Thus in-service education facilities were greatly extended. Among other initiatives, a Co-ordinator of In-Service Education was appointed (1973); teachers centres were established (1973); full-time release programs were begun (1975); and the Bardon Professional Development Centre was opened in Brisbane (1977). Other support facilities and personnel introduced included a variety of specialist teachers, including advisory teachers (1970), teacher-librarians (1970–71) and resource teachers (1975), teacher aides (1973) appointed as a means of relieving teachers of some non-teaching duties, expanded and decentralised guidance facilities, and expanded media facilities, including new media forms such as videotapes. From the 1960s district inspectors provided further support for the classroom teacher, placing a greater emphasis on advice and support. Finally, the reorganisation of the planning and services functions of Head Office increased the Department's effectiveness in monitoring and evaluating the implementation of programs, and developing new programs (e.g. religious education) and resources (e.g. studies of local school environments).

A major development, particularly after 1973, was the injection of increasing amounts of Australian Government funding into specific areas of education provided by state governments. This assisted the development of library facilities which superseded standard state-issued textbooks. These federal funds also allowed greater attention to disadvantaged groups, including Aborigines, migrants and the geographically isolated, thus giving support to the Queensland Government policy of equality of educational opportunity. Furthermore, federal funds have made a major contribution to the school-based innovations program developed after 1973.

Other trends during the 1970s which influenced the education system were the increasing community interest in education and the concern for accountability to the community. In combination with the great diversity of values in modern society, these trends have created debate over such issues as the role of the 3 Rs in education, the standards of education, and the proposed introduction of human relationships and religious education courses in schools. Such debates prompted the appointment in 1978 of a Parliamentary Select Committee to investigate the education system. The recommendations of this committee are still under consideration.

Innovations in teaching methods have brought accompanying changes in primary school architecture. The official opening of Petrie Terrace State School in 1970 introduced a new era of modern school buildings incorporating open area teaching spaces and the extensive use of carpeting and sound-proofing.

=== 21st century ===
In 2007 a Prep (preparatory) year was introduced as an optional choice prior to Year 1. It is a full-time program operating within primary schools within normal school hours. Children must be 5 years old by 30 June to enrol in Prep that year. From 2017, Prep became compulsory. As part of this process, the entry age into Year 1 was raised by six months.

In 2015, Year 7 was moved from primary schools into secondary schools following a trial involving 20 secondary schools in 2012.

These changes were motivated to bring Queensland into line with other states to better facilitate the 2014 introduction of the Australian Curriculum, a national program to provide a more consistent education across Australia, reducing problems for children moving between schools in different states, each with a different curriculum.

== Secondary education ==
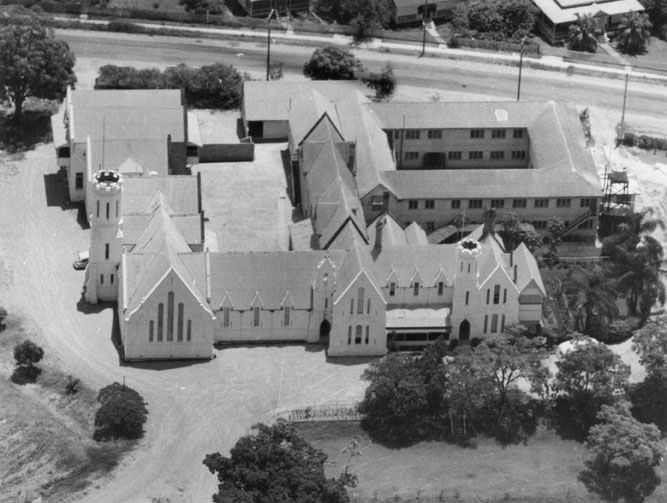
Aerial photograph of Ipswich Grammar School

=== Grammar schools ===
In 1860 Queensland's first Parliament passed the Grammar Schools Act 1860 which allowed for the establishment of a grammar school in any town where at least £1000 could be raised locally. The act provided for a government subsidy of twice this local contribution. When established, each school could be run by its own seven-member board, including a government representative. The first grammar school established under the 1860 act was the Ipswich Grammar School, opened in 1863. In the years 1863–1892, 10 grammar schools were opened, the last being the Rockhampton Girls Grammar School.

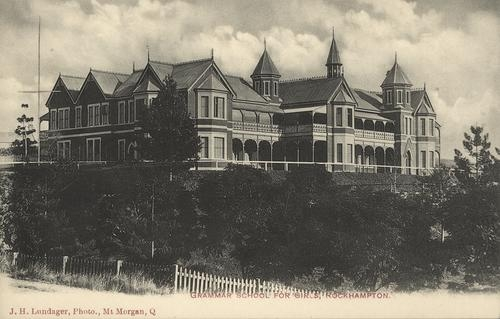
Rockhampton Girls Grammar School, circa 1895

Queensland grammar schools followed the traditional English model, with curricular dominated by classical subjects like Latin and Greek. Because fees were charged, the children of gentlemen, the wealthy of the colony, were the only ones likely to avail themselves of grammar schools. These schools catered for an elite, in accord with the nineteenth century view that popular education beyond the elementary level was not desirable.

Provision for the award of scholarships to grammar schools was made in the Grammar Schools Act 1860. The first awards were made in 1864 for the 1865 school year at Ipswich Grammar School (the only one then existing). Between 1865 and 1873 only about twelve such scholarships were awarded. Selection was on the basis of a personal examination by a senior officer (in 1864 the Colonial Secretary acted as the first examiner). The first formal Scholarship examination was held in July 1883. Until 1914 a fixed number of scholarships was awarded though the number varied over the years depending on the amount of money allocated. From 1914 this system was changed and all students obtaining 50 per cent or more in the examination, were awarded a scholarship to any approved secondary school (which by then included state high schools).

In 1891 a Royal Commission on Education advised that a "system of secondary schools more directly controlled as to foundation and management by the State would be less expensive and quite as effective in the education of the youth of the colony". Grammar schools would continue, but would be supplemented by a state secondary system similar to the "superior" school system in NSW, in which secondary classes were attached to primary schools.

Initially, the Department of Public Instruction opposed this extension of secondary education. The Under Secretary and General Inspector were both conservative men who believed that the Department had enough to do to implement compulsory, free and secular primary education. Furthermore, they felt that Queensland's economy was not ready for such an expansion of secondary education: "The State can only absorb a certain quantity of highly educated labour and if it spends the years of its young people in the pursuit of higher education, there will be a loss as these young people find themselves forced to fall into the ordinary avocations of life". Perhaps there were social reasons too for this fear of "over education".

Despite these doubts, the Education Act 1875 was amended in 1897 to allow additional subjects to be taught. Literature, science, algebra and geometry were added to the syllabus of sixth class, the highest in the primary school. Though this change affected a small minority of schools, it was the beginning of state secondary education in Queensland.

Another area of development of secondary education was within the technical colleges. During the 1880s and the 1890s some of them provided night classes in grammar school subjects. By 1898 the Brisbane Central Technical College was providing a full secondary curriculum during the day, and in 1905 the South Brisbane Technical College opened a high school which prepared day students for the Sydney public examinations. In 1910 the Department of Public Instruction established separate day schools within the two technical colleges directly under their administration: Brisbane Central Technical College and Warwick Technical College. Though strongly oriented towards technical education, and consequently not regarded as the first state high schools, these schools did prepare students for the Junior and Senior examinations of the University of Queensland.

=== State high schools ===
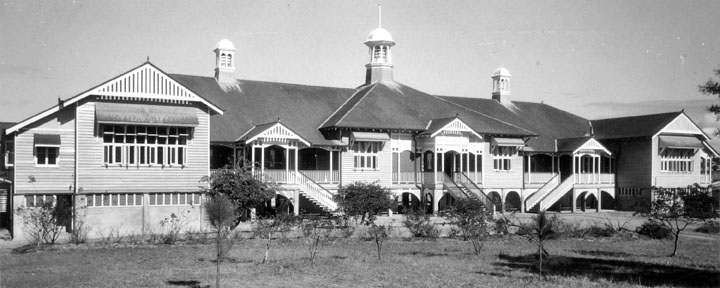
Gympie State High School, 1940

The huge task of bringing secondary education to all Queensland children was finally tackled in 1912. The Queensland Government undertook to establish a free high school in places with a likely attendance of 25 qualified students, provided that there was no other provision for other government-funded secondary education (such as grammar schools) in these places. State high schools were opened in six centres - Charters Towers, Gympie, Mount Morgan, Warwick, Bundaberg and Mackay - in 1912, while secondary departments were attached to the primary schools at Herberton, Gatton and Childers. General, commercial and domestic science courses were offered.

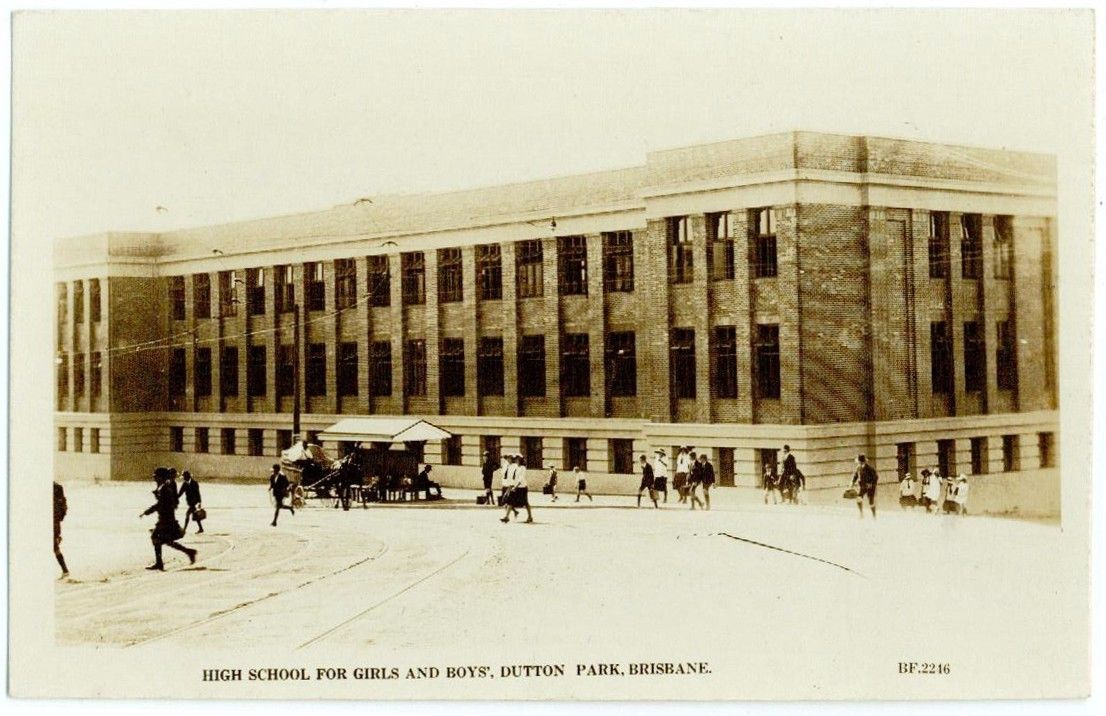
Brisbane State High School, circa 1940s

These facilities were extended gradually to other parts of Queensland over the next twelve years. Between 1913 and 1918, new secondary departments were opened at Dalby, Kingaroy, Pittsworth, Southport, Wynnum Central and Emerald. Separate high schools were opened at Roma and Brisbane (1920) and Cairns and Townsville (1924). The secondary departments connected with the Brisbane Central Boys’ and the Brisbane Central Girls’ Schools were amalgamated from 1 January 1920 and designated "The Brisbane Junior High School". In 1921 this school was merged with high school classes at the Brisbane Central Technical College to form the Brisbane State High School. In 1924 it moved to its present site adjacent to Musgrave Park, South Brisbane.

By 1924 there were five high school sections attached to technical colleges (Rockhampton, Toowoomba, Bowen, Ipswich and Central), making a total of 22 state secondary schools in Queensland. The next year, 1925, the technical, commercial and domestic science secondary sections of the Brisbane Central Technical College were each given high school status and subsequently became separate high schools.

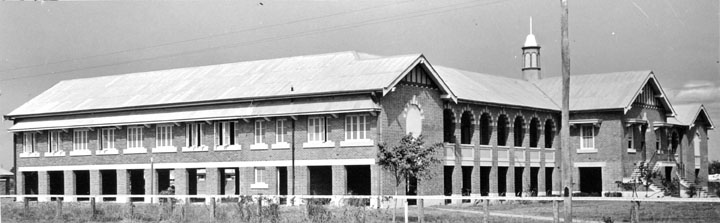
Ayr Intermediate School, 1940

From 1925 until the later 1930s there was little expansions in secondary education, one significant reason being the depressed economic conditions of much of this period. Though several new secondary departments were provided, Ayr State High School, opened in 1937, was the only new high school. In 1936, the Maryborough Grammar School and Maryborough Girls' Grammar Schools were in financial difficulty and were taken over by the Queensland Government, merging them into the Maryborough State High School.

An important development after 1928 was the creation of intermediate schools as links between primary and high schools. These schools, created in the wake of the 1927 Hadow Report in England, drew children aged 12 years from a ring of contributing primary schools. They offered a two-year course, with appropriate attention to science, manual training, domestic science, and the predominant economic interests of the local area. In retrospect, the intermediate school concept did not work very well, mainly because of the expense and organisational problems involved in providing separate schools for a two-year course. In 1936 there were only two separate intermediate schools in Queensland, though intermediate classes were attached to a number of high schools.

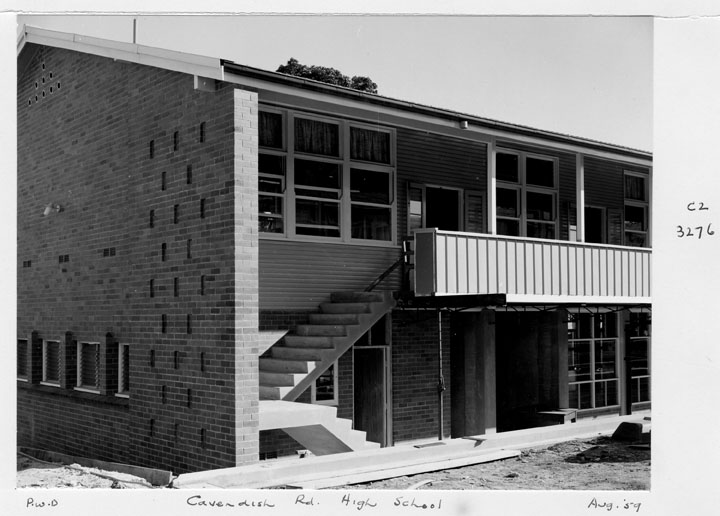
Cavendish Road State High School,1959

The first suburban state high schools in Brisbane to offer a range of subjects were opened at Wynnum in 1942 and Holland Park (Cavendish Road State High School) in 1952. Rural state high schools have always offered a range of subjects, mainly because the size of their localities would not permit the provision of separate schools similar to the Commercial, Domestic Science and Industrial High Schools in Brisbane.

In August 1957 there were 37 state high schools, and 34 secondary departments attached to primary schools in Queensland, with a total enrolment of 15,444 (including correspondence students). After 1957, the Department further extended secondary education by liberalising the awarding of scholarships, opening many new secondary schools and instituting transport services for isolated students. By 1980 the number of state secondary schools in Queensland had almost tripled to 135 high schools and 68 secondary departments, while enrolments had increased to 105,427. In the same period, Queensland's population increased from 1,392,384 to an estimated 2,213,000.

Although this expansion was largely enabled by the more favourable economic conditions in Australia during the 1950s and 1960s, the forces which helped to bring it about and shape its course were diverse and complex. During the period 1930 to 1957 there were many changes in community attitudes and new perceptions of societal needs arising from many demographic, industrial and economic movements. The following factors had a particularly significantly influence on the demand for secondary education in Queensland:

- The moderate increases in the Queensland birth rate from 1939 to 1941 and the more rapid increases in 1942 to 1947. These increases were reflected in the numbers of students completing primary schooling in the period 1952 to 1960. Moreover, in the period 1949 to 1959, the retention rates in the final year of primary schooling increased from 59 to 85 per cent.
- The relative affluence of the 1950s, 1960s and early 1970s throughout the western world combined with rapid scientific and technological advancement created a demand for increased numbers of workers with special skills in the sciences and technology.
- An acceleration in the movement of the workforce from occupations in primary and secondary industries to occupations in service industries and the professions. As a result, a much larger proportion of the workforce was employed in clerical, administrative and professional positions.

By 1960 almost 80 per cent of 14-year-olds were remaining at school of their own volition, so that it could be said that the Watkin Committee's recommendation in 1961 that the leaving age be raised to 15 sought to recognise a fait accompli. The Watkin Committee (chaired by Herbert Georg Watkin, Director-General of Education) also recommended that this extension in the years of compulsory schooling should be coupled with a reduction in the age of transfer from primary to secondary school and the provision of new secondary curricula. These recommendations were largely implemented under the Education Act of 1964. Under this Act, secondary school curricula and examinations became the responsibility of two new administrative bodies, the Board of Junior Secondary School Studies and the Board of Senior Secondary School Studies. During the second half of the 1960s these Boards kept the Junior and Senior syllabuses and examinations under constant review, in an effort to cater for the wider range of abilities and future vocations of the students then entering the secondary school. In some cases, as in certain of the Senior science subjects, such as physics, biology and chemistry, completely new courses were introduced.

In an attempt to provide for the large proportion of secondary students who did not intend to continue on to higher studies, a range of modified Junior courses was introduced in 1965. These included courses in English Expression, general mathematics, general science, social studies and homecrafts. The Radford Committee, appointed in 1969 to review the system of public examinations for Queensland secondary school students and to make recommendations for the assessment of students' achievement, suggested in its 1970 report that public examinations be replaced by a system of internal school assessment.

The Radford Committee's recommendations were enacted in the Education Act Amendment Act (No.2) of 1970. Consequently, the Junior and Senior examinations, first held in 1910, were held for the last time in 1970 and 1972 respectively. The Scholarship examination, first held in 1873, was held for the last time in 1962, and in 1963 Grade 8 became a part of secondary schooling. These changes meant that no Queensland school student in 1973 was required to sit for a public examination. The century long reign of the public examination was over. Freed from the constraints of public examinations, syllabuses could now be significantly revised and teachers given much more freedom in interpreting and teaching them.

Overall responsibility for implementing the Radford proposals was given to a Board of Secondary School Studies established in 1971. As it was some time before the new broad framework syllabuses could be prepared by the Board, most schools in the early 1970s continued to rely on the older more prescriptive syllabuses. Nevertheless, between 1971 and 1978, 70 new syllabuses were written, trialled, piloted, brought into full operation and in some cases revised. The new English syllabus, for example, had been written and trialled by 1973, and was progressively introduced to Years 8–12 between 1974 and 1979. In addition to syllabuses devised by the Board, some schools have constructed their own syllabuses for what then became designated as "school subjects". From 1981 further changes in assessment procedures will be progressively implemented on the recommendation of the Scott Committee, which was established by the Board of Secondary School Studies in 1976. The Scott Committee recommended that a competency-based system of assessing and reporting students' achievements be implemented.

One of the effects of the introduction of internal assessment and of broad framework syllabuses was a marked increase in the workload of teachers, with respect to curriculum development and assessment, as well as changes in the nature of the work that teachers were asked to perform. The Radford Committee anticipated these problems, as the following extract from its report indicates:

"To meet these and other long-standing needs, the Department made provision (or extended existing provisions) for a large number of support services, some of which were school-based. Some of these provided professional, specialist support, while others provided non-professional support designed to free teachers from clerical and similar duties to allow them to concentrate on the professional aspects of their work with students. As described in the earlier section on primary education, these initiatives included the appointment of teacher-librarians, resource and remedial teachers, and teacher aides, as well as the extension of guidance and resource services and in-service education."

As with primary education, these developments were accompanied by changes in secondary school architecture. In 1972 a detailed evaluation of secondary school building designs was commenced, and in 1973 Cabinet approval was granted for the planning of a new concept designed around a faculty-based campus. The first new high school built to this design was Craigslea State High School opened in 1975, the centenary of the Department's establishment.

=== 21st century ===
In 2015, Year 7 was moved from primary schools into secondary schools following a trial involving 20 secondary schools in 2012. This change was motivated to bring Queensland into line with other states to better facilitate the 2014 introduction of the Australian Curriculum, a national program to provide a more consistent education across Australia, reducing problems for children moving between schools in different states, each with a different curriculum.

In 2007–2008, three academies were opened for high achieving students; these academies offer Years 10–12 and entry to them is competitive based on ability. Each was to specialise in a topic area and be co-located with a university with a strength in that same topic area. In 2008 the Queensland Academy for Creative Industries opened at Kelvin Grove, Brisbane within the Kelvin Grove campus of the Queensland University of Technology in close proximity to the university's Faculty of Creative Industries. In 2008 the Queensland Academy for Science, Mathematics and Technology was opened in Toowong, Brisbane, on the site of the Toowong College (a state high school which closed in 2006); this location was chosen "to capitalise on its close educational and geographic links with the University of Queensland" (but was 4 km away from the university's St Lucia campus). In 2009 the Queensland Academy for Health Sciences opened at Southport within the Gold Coast campus of Griffith University.

== Technical education ==
=== 19th century ===
During the 1860s and 1870s, formal education in Queensland beyond primary level was conducted almost exclusively in grammar schools. These schools were expensive and thus available only to the wealthy. There were some individuals, however, who could not afford a grammar school education but were interested in further education which would provide a form of upward social mobility. The middle class liberals of the time encouraged such attitudes to education. In 1872 Charles Lilley, for example, urged that the North Brisbane School of Arts and Sciences should be used as a centre for teaching young mechanics and tradesmen the elements of the useful arts and sciences. Lilley believed that such an education would lead to greater industrial efficiency and productivity and would also further the careers of these young men. Technical classes were established in that year but failed to continue beyond 1872.

It was not until 1881 when J. A. Clarke and C. Waagepetersen took regular classes in mechanical art and freehand drawing that technical education proved successful. The students included some schoolboys and also men studying in such fields as architecture, carpentry, shipbuilding, surveying, photography and engineering. In 1882 the Brisbane Technical College began formally, as a result of efforts by the President of the North Brisbane School of Arts, the Hon. John Douglas, formerly Premier of Queensland.

A sub-committee of the North Brisbane School of Arts was formed to control the college and an annual grant of £600 was obtained from the Queensland Parliament. In 1882 the college had nine teachers who gave instruction in 11 subjects to 80 students. There was no systematic approach to courses of instruction.

By 1889 the college's activities were made distinct from those of the School of Arts, and the work of instruction was placed under David Rose McConnel who systematised instruction and remained in control for 20 years. In 1892 a pound for pound subsidy was instituted, which meant that such classes as typewriting, shorthand and bookkeeping, which attracted large numbers of students and required little apparatus, were most profitable. Science classes attracted small numbers, were unremunerative, and often could be maintained only by the enthusiasm of the instructors. The Brisbane Technical College Incorporation Act 1898 set up a council consisting of six government representatives, three elected by the subscribers and three elected by certified students. This council controlled the college for the next 10 years.

Outside Brisbane, the technical colleges were limited neither by statue nor by regulations. Classes of technical instruction were held in 15 centres, usually in conjunction with the School of Arts, and, as reports by district inspectors showed in 1901, the funds supplied were used in a variety of ways unconnected with technical education. One instance was where a violin teacher taught private pupils listed at a technical college and split the government subsidy with the college. As students selected their own subjects, often with no clear objective in view, studies were often not co-ordinated towards preparation for a vocation. The first technical college which prepared students for a specific vocation was the Charters Towers School of Mines which opened its doors to 100 students in 1901, under the supervision of the Department of Mines.

Towards the end of the nineteenth century, the government wished to rationalise technical education in Queensland since it was considered that one of the reasons for the industrial and trade successes of Germany at Great Britain's expense had been efficient German technical education. The desire to integrate a more efficient technical education into the general education system, in the name of national efficiency and self-survival, led to a sequence of reforms.

=== 20th century ===
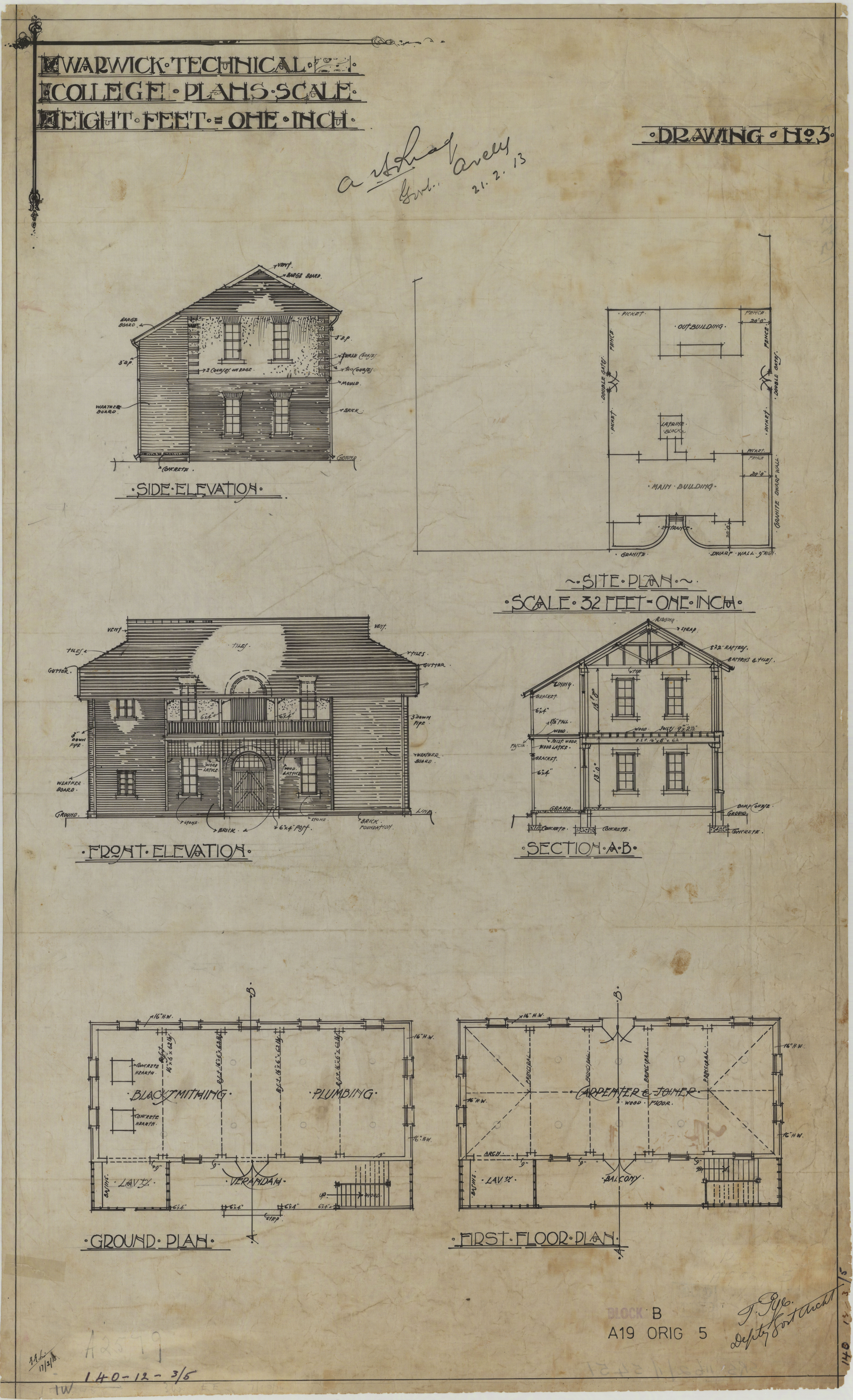
Architectural plans for Warwick Technical College, 1913

In 1902 a Board of Technical Education was created to advise the minister.

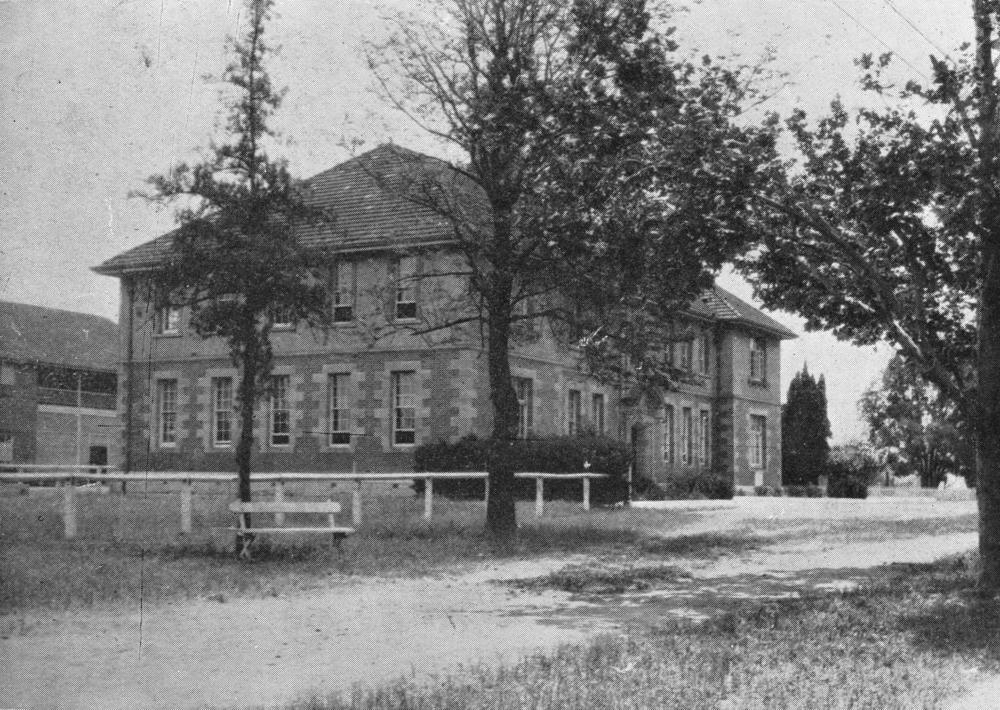
Warwick Technical College, 1933

In 1905, as a result of disagreements between the Council of the Brisbane Technical Education and the department, the board was abolished and a separate branch of the Department of Public Instruction was created to exercise greater control over technical education.

R. M. Riddell, as Inspector of Technical Colleges, was placed in charge of this branch. The Inspector's duties were to foster and develop the system of technical education, to inspect the technical colleges, and to supervise the grants. After 1905 the various colleges were placed on a more uniform footing with regard to the syllabus, examinations and endowments. As the reports of the Inspector drew attention the wastefulness and overlapping of the three Brisbane technical colleges (North Brisbane, South Brisbane and West End), the Technical Instruction Act 1908 was passed, amalgamating them into the Central Technical College and providing for direct state control. After the passing of the Technical Instruction Amendment Act 1918, the control of the country colleges was gradually transferred to the Department of Public Instruction.

Warwick Technology College commenced in Guy Street in 1906, taking over the technical classes offered by the Warwick School of Arts since 1896. The college attracted many students and a new larger building was required. After some years of community fund raising, on Saturday 28 February 1914, the Queensland Governor laid the foundation stone of the new Warwick Technical College and High School in front of a crowd of about 2,000 dignitaries and local residents despite the rain falling so heavily through the ceremony that the governor's speech could not be heard. The college would consist of a main college building (costing £9000 with a separate trades block (£2000) plus ancillary works for a total of £11,710.

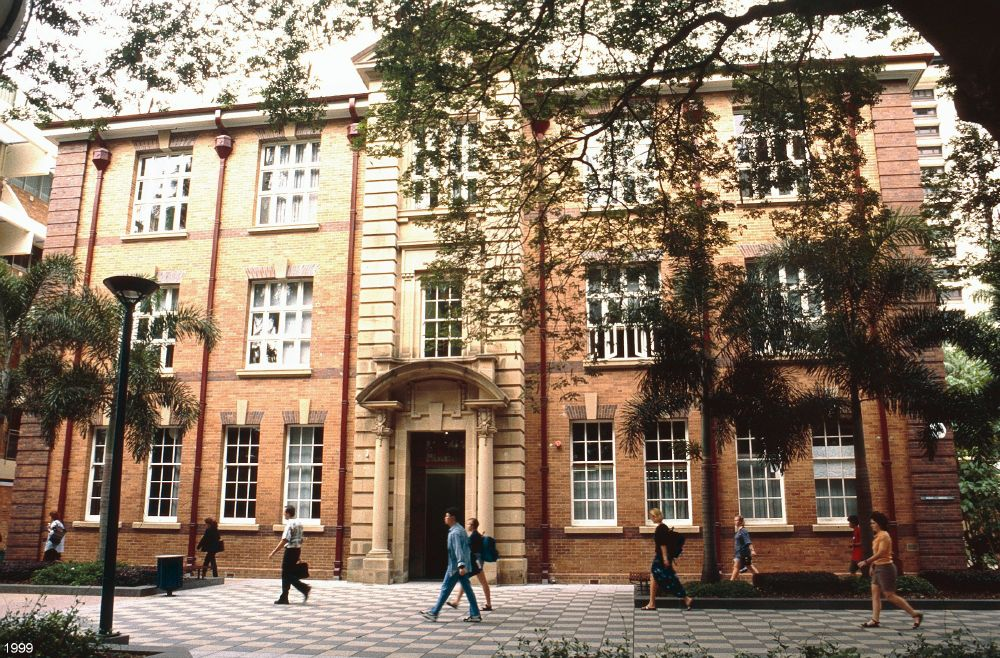
Brisbane Central Technical College (now part of Queensland University of Technology)

In 1914 the Brisbane Central Technical College occupied new buildings adjacent to the University of Queensland. The Diploma of Engineering work of the College was then co-ordinated with that of the Faculty of Engineering of the University.

A few years later, at the conclusion of World War I, technical colleges provided rehabilitation trade courses for ex-servicemen. Shortly after this, in 1924, a major step in the public recognition of technical college qualifications was made when the holders of prescribed diplomas were given the right to '"letters" after their names.

When the Great Depression of the 1930s came, it was hoped that unemployment would be alleviated if the jobless were taught trade skills, the unskilled workers being the first to be affected by the Depression. Furthermore, the government saw a political danger in having so many young men idle. Unemployed youth were consequently encouraged to attend free training in various technical skills at the technical colleges.

After the outbreak of World War II in 1939, the Technical Education Branch trained thousands of skilled workers for munitions works, the aircraft factories and the technical branches of the services. At the end of the war, Commonwealth Reconstruction Training Courses were provided for ex-servicemen in the technical colleges. The post-war period was a difficult one for the Technical Education Branch. Although the equipment and machines of the colleges had been in use for long periods during the war, it had not been possible to replace them as they depreciated. As a consequence, the branch was faced with the task of replacing heavy equipment in the post-war period when salaries and other running costs were rising.

The remarkable post-war growth of secondary industry created a growing demand for trained personnel at both the technician (tradesman) and technologist (professional) levels. To meet this demand, technical education was reorganised in the 1960s, many of the existing colleges being raised to tertiary level and others being created to provide additional technical education. Acceptance by the Australian Government of the 1964 Martin Report, which recommended that increased funds be made available to the states to help establish autonomous tertiary-level institutes of advanced education, provided the financial support for this reorganisation. The Education Act 1964 provided the necessary legislative basis for the reorganisation. It created a Technical Education Advisory Council, with members from industry, commerce, education and government departments, which was responsible for advising the Minister for Education on the future development of technical education.

Consequently, in the late 1960s and 1970s, technical education divided into two streams. Tertiary-level institutes of technology were established at Brisbane in 1965, and Toowoomba and Rockhampton in 1967. These were granted autonomy in 1971. Furthermore, to help fulfil the demand for technical or certificate-level studies, a perimeter of specialist technical colleges was established around Brisbane in the early 1970s, each specialising in one or more of the sub-tertiary functions of the Brisbane Central Technical College, which was phased out. These colleges were situated at Yeronga, Eagle Farm, South Brisbane, Ithaca, Kangaroo Point, Coorparoo and Seven Hills. At the same time many of the country colleges, e.g. Mount Isa, Cairns and Bundaberg, were moved into new accommodation, separate from the high schools.

The recommendations of the Martin Report and the Education Act 1964 also led to a reorganisation of post-secondary agricultural education. The Department of Education recognised that the elevation of the Queensland Agricultural College at Lawes to tertiary status would leave Queensland without institutions for agricultural education at sub-tertiary or technician level. The Rural Training Schools Act 1965 filled this gap by providing for post-secondary schools serving particular industries. The first of these rural training schools was opened at Longreach in 1967 to serve the wool industry. Schools were later opened at Emerald in 1971 to serve the beef industry, Claredale in the Burdekin region in 1976 to serve the tropical and sub-tropical coast, and Dalby in 1979 to serve the grain industry.

A further period of rationalisation of post-secondary education began in 1974, with the release of the draft report of the Australian Commission on Technical and Further Education. This report recognised that because of rapid school change and the creation of new industries, society's needs and expectations for technical education had changed in the previous decade. It recommended that community resources for adult and technical education be rationalised and expanded to meet these new needs and expectations. In consequence, further funds were made available to technical and further education in 1975–76, and in January 1977 the integration of the two areas was completed and TAFE formally came into existence.

New TAFE colleges were opened and existing facilities improved. Courses offered were greatly expanded, particularly in the area of pre-vocational courses and courses designed to foster greater community involvement in technical education. In fact, the basis of the TAFE conception has been the identification of local colleges with the needs of the local community.

== Heritage listings ==
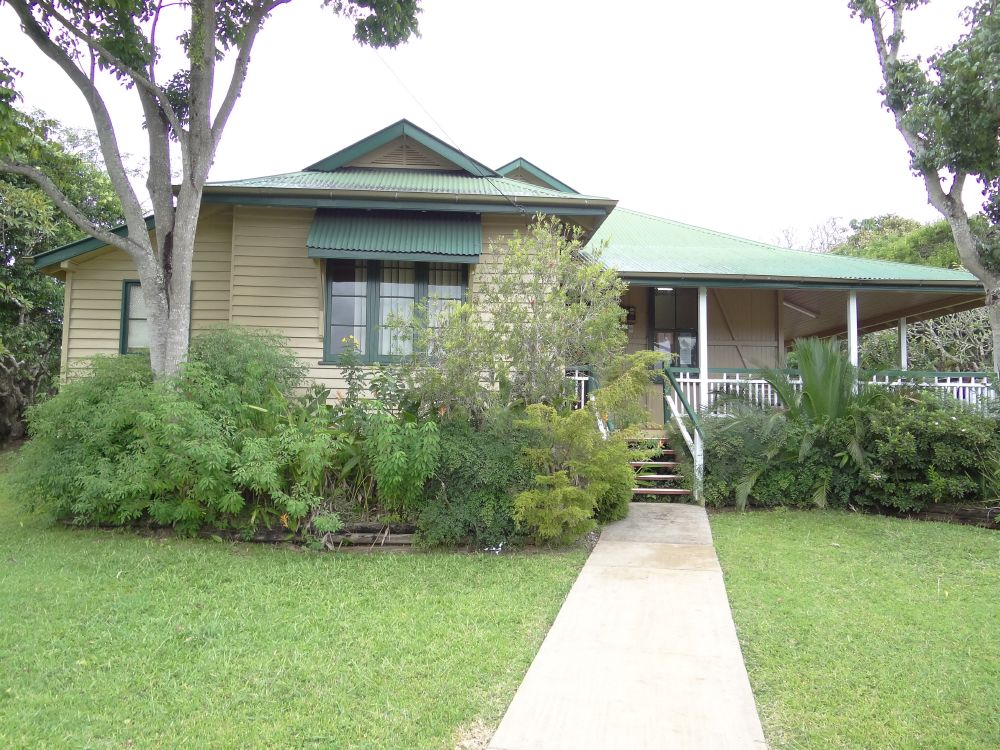
Atherton State School Head Teacher's Residence

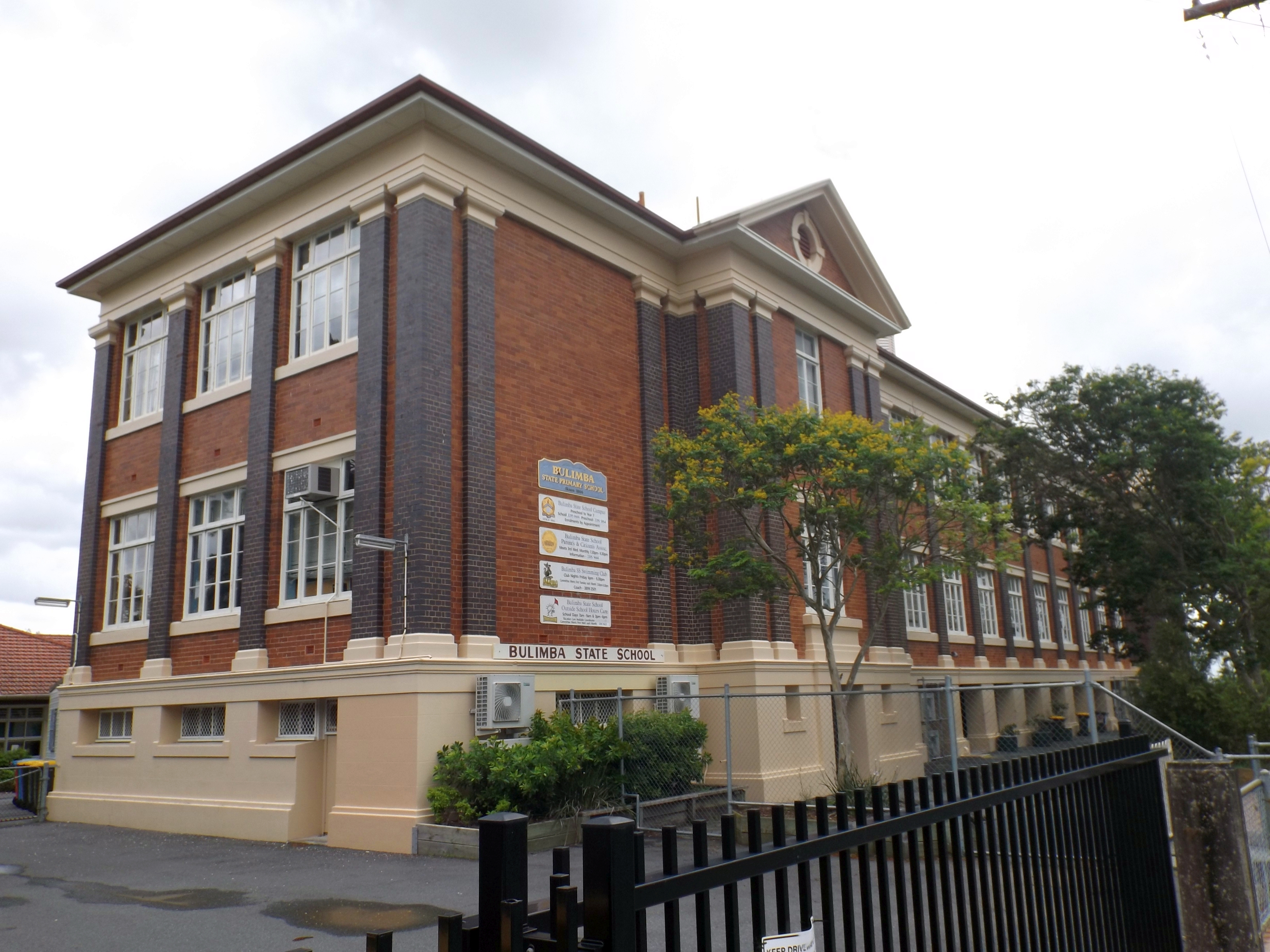
Bulimba State School

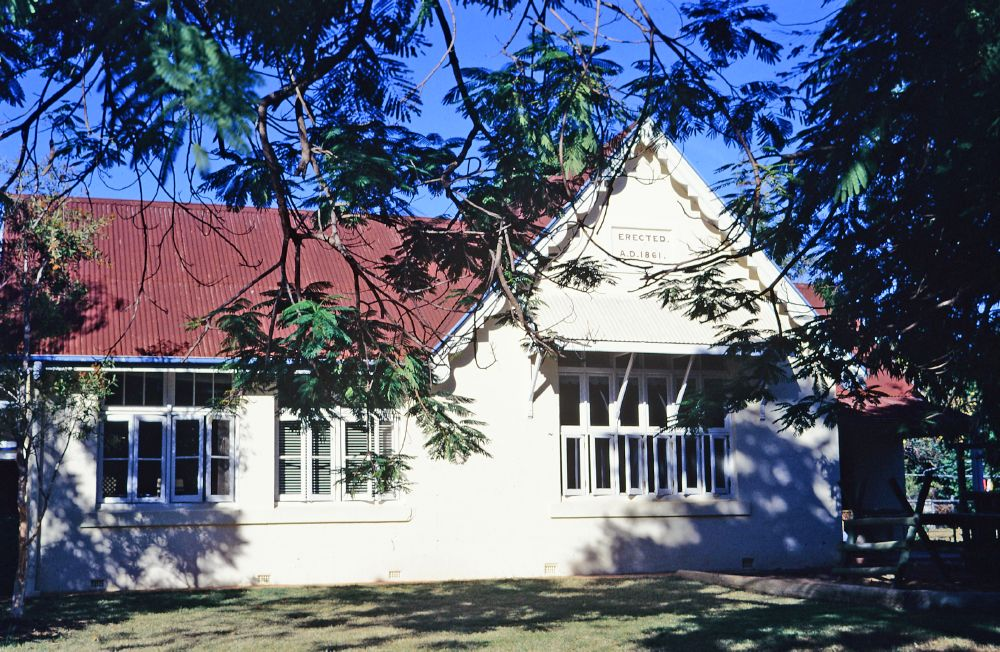
Gayndah State School

Many state education institutions are heritage-listed, including:

School name	Suburb/locality	Local government area
Ascot State School	Ascot	City of Brisbane
Atherton State School Head Teacher's Residence	Atherton	Tablelands Region
Ayr State High School	Ayr	Shire of Burdekin
Baroona Special School	Petrie Terrace	City of Brisbane
Boolboonda State School	Gin Gin	Bundaberg Region
Bowen State School	Bowen	Whitsunday Region
Brisbane Central State School	Spring Hill	City of Brisbane
Brisbane South Girls and Infants School	South Brisbane	City of Brisbane
Bulimba State School	Bulimba	City of Brisbane
Bundaberg State High School	Bundaberg South	Bundaberg Region
Buranda State School	Woolloongabba	City of Brisbane
Cairns Technical College and High School Building	Cairns North	Cairns Region
Charters Towers School of Mines	Charters Towers	Charters Towers Region
Coorparoo State School	Coorparoo	City of Brisbane
Dalby State High School	Dalby	Western Downs Region
East Brisbane State School	East Brisbane	City of Brisbane
Fortitude Valley State School	Fortitude Valley	City of Brisbane
Gayndah State School	Gayndah	North Burnett Region
Gladstone Central State School, Block B	Gladstone	Gladstone Region
Hemmant State School	Hemmant	City of Brisbane
Indooroopilly State High School	Indooroopilly	City of Brisbane
Ipswich West State School	West Ipswich	City of Ipswich
Ithaca Creek State School	Bardon	City of Brisbane
Ipswich North State School	North Ipswich	City of Ipswich
Junction Park State School	Annerley	City of Brisbane
Kalkie State School	Bundaberg	Bundaberg Region
Leyburn State School	Leyburn	Southern Downs Region
Mackay Central State School	Mackay	Mackay Region
Maryborough State High School	Maryborough	Fraser Coast Region
Maryborough Central State School	Maryborough	Fraser Coast Region
Mitchell State School (1914 Building)	Mitchell	Maranoa Region
Monkland State School Residence	Gympie	Gympie Region
Moorooka State School	Moorooka	City of Brisbane
Mount Morgan Central State School	Mount Morgan	Rockhampton Region
Mount Morgan State High School	Mount Morgan	Rockhampton Region
Mount Tarampa State School	Mount Tarampa	Somerset Region
Murgon State School	Murgon	South Burnett Region
New Farm State School	New Farm	City of Brisbane
Newmarket State School	Newmarket	City of Brisbane
Norman Park State School	Norman Park	City of Brisbane
Nundah State School	Nundah	City of Brisbane
Old Carbrook State School	Carbrook	City of Logan
Old Logan Village State School	Logan Village	City of Logan
Picnic Bay State School	Picnic Bay	City of Townsville
Prenzlau State School	Prenzlau	Somerset Region
Ravenswood School and Residence	Ravenswood	Charters Towers Region
Redland Bay State School Residence	Redland Bay	City of Redland
Sherwood State School	Sherwood	City of Brisbane
Southport State High School Buildings	Southport	City of Gold Coast
Springbrook State School	Springbrook	City of Gold Coast
Stafford State School	Stafford	City of Brisbane
Tallegalla State School	Tallegalla	City of Ipswich
Tarampa State School	Tarampa	Somerset Region
Toowoomba East State School	East Toowoomba	Toowoomba Region
Toowoomba North State School	Toowoomba City	Toowoomba Region
Toowoomba South State School	South Toowoomba	Toowoomba Region
Townsville Central State School	North Ward	City of Townsville
Townsville West State School	West End	City of Townsville
Tully State School	Tully	Cassowary Coast Region
Urangan Point State School, Block D	Urangan	Fraser Coast Region
Ventnor State School	Ventnor	North Burnett Region
Warwick Central State School	Warwick	Southern Downs Region
Warwick East State School	Warwick	Southern Downs Region
Waterford State School	Waterford	City of Logan
Windsor State School	Windsor	City of Brisbane
Wooloowin State School	Lutwyche	City of Brisbane
Yeppoon State School building	Yeppoon	Shire of Livingstone
Yeronga State School	Yeronga	City of Brisbane

== See also ==
- Education in Australia
- Queensland State Schools
- List of schools in Queensland includes state and non-state schools
