= Selective school =

School that has criteria for admittance

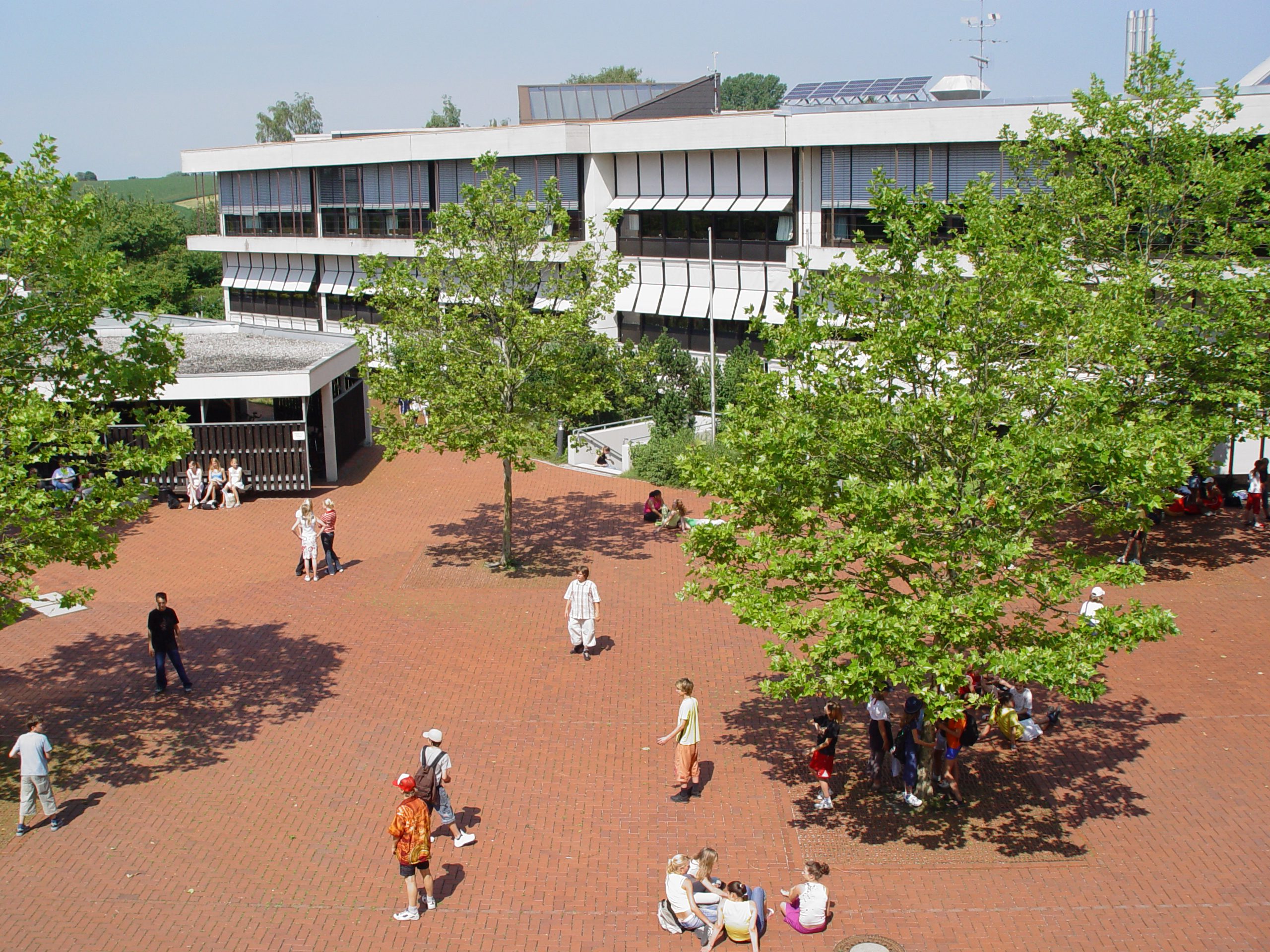
Selective school (Gymnasium) in Germany.

A selective school is a school that admits students on the basis of some sort of selection criteria, usually academic. The term may have different connotations in different systems and is the opposite of a comprehensive school, which accepts all students, regardless of aptitude. Primary education is rarely selective, secondary education is selective and comprehensive depending on country, at the university level is almost universally selective.

== Australia ==
=== New South Wales ===
In New South Wales, selective high schools are government schools that select students on the basis of academic ability. Most students enter a selective high school in Year 7, after sitting the Selective High Schools Test the previous year. The process of entering selective schools is much like that of a university, with students electing their preferences and getting chosen for schools based on their performance on the Selective High Schools Test.

Compared to the other states, New South Wales has many more selective and partially selective schools, (see List of selective high schools in New South Wales).

=== Victoria ===
In Victoria, Australia, there are four non-specialised selective schools: Melbourne High School, Mac.Robertson Girls' High School, Nossal High School and Suzanne Cory High School.

There are also a number of selective schools specialising in specific areas, such as the Victorian College of the Arts Secondary School (specialising in the arts), John Monash Science School (specialising in science) and Maribyrnong College (specialising in sport). The University High School also operates a selective science-specialist subschool called Elizabeth Blackburn Sciences.

In addition to these, there are also over 40 schools in Victoria offering Select Entry Accelerated Learning (SEAL) programs, in which academically gifted students may either complete secondary education in five years (instead of six) or complete their Victorian Certificate of Education in three years (instead of two).

All students who seek to enrol in the fully selective schools or in the partially selective SEAL schools must sit entrance examinations, with the exception of a few of the specialist schools.

=== Queensland ===
In Queensland, there are four selective entry high schools: Brisbane State High School, which is partially selective and formed in 1921, and the three Queensland Academies, which are fully selective and were formed in 2007/8. All require entry based on academic entry tests, Naplan results, primary school grades, interviews and other considerations. In 2005, the premier of Queensland, Peter Beattie announced as part of the Smart State Strategy the additional creation of the Queensland Academies "as an innovative alternative educational program for highly capable high school students." There are three Queensland Academies for students Years 10 to 12 and all study the International Baccalaureate Diploma Program which in 2019 had a yearly fee of $2,291.45. In 2019 QASMT additionally opened entry to grade 7 students. Brisbane State High School is for Years 7 to 12 and does not have an International Baccalaureate Diploma Program fee, although a fee is payable (less than $260 in 2019), with its membership in the Great Public Schools Association of Queensland and Queensland Girls' Secondary Schools Sports Association.

The Queensland Academy for Science, Mathematics and Technology (QASMT) at Toowong was opened in 2007. It has a partnership with the University of Queensland at St Lucia. The Queensland Academy for Creative Industries (QACI) at Kelvin Grove opened in 2007. It has a partnership with the Queensland University of Technology Creative Industries Precinct at Kelvin Grove. The Queensland Academy for Health Sciences opened on the Gold Coast (QAHS) in 2008. It has a partnership with Griffith University at the Gold Coast. In the University of NSW ICAS competition for 2018, university medals (The highest result in the state) were awarded to: Brisbane State High School 13 Medal/s, QASMT 1 Medal/s, QACI 0 Medal/s and QAHS 1 Medal/s. In the same competition for 2017 university medals were awarded to Brisbane State High School 12 Medal/s, QASMT 1 Medal/s, QACI 0 Medal/s and QAHS 0 Medal/s. In 2018 in Queensland there were 733 OP 1's Overall Position (The highest possible result high school graduates can receive in Queensland and a 99+ ATAR.) out of which 67 (9.14% of the Queensland total) were achieved at Brisbane State High School.

=== Western Australia ===
In Western Australia, selective secondary education (officially named Gifted and Talented Education (GATE)) is operated by the Western Australian Department of Education through the Gifted and Talented Selective Entrance Programs for Year 7, and subject to limited placement availability for year-levels upward to Year 10. All applicants are required to sit the Academic Selective Entrance Test and possibly complete combined interviews, auditions and/or workshops depending on the program(s) applied for. The programs are categorized into three strands: academic, language, and arts. Eighteen state schools participate in the Gifted and Talented Programs, each specializing in one of the strands. All participating schools are partially selective and partially local intake, with the exception of Perth Modern School which is fully selective.

== United Kingdom ==
Most government funded secondary schools in the UK are comprehensive schools, which are non-selective. However, there are still 163 grammar schools in several counties of England, which select pupils either on the basis of an eleven-plus examination, by an internally set and moderated examination, or by both. There are no selective state schools in Scotland or Wales, however private schools located there typically require an entrance test to gain admission.

Grammar school areas and groups as identified by the Education (Grammar School Ballots) Regulations 1998:

- Bexley
- Buckinghamshire
- Kent
- Lincolnshire
- Medway Towns
- Slough
- Southend
- Torbay
- Trafford

Several other areas were identified as having a non-selective system, but with at least one selective school existing alongside their comprehensive counterparts, these were: Barnet, Birmingham, Bournemouth, Bristol, Bromley, Calderdale, Cumbria, Devon, Enfield, Essex, Gloucestershire, Lancashire, Liverpool, Kingston-upon-Thames, Kirklees, North Yorkshire, Plymouth, Poole, Reading, Redbridge, Stoke-on-Trent, Walsall, Warwickshire, Wiltshire, Wirral, Wolverhampton, The Wrekin.

There are also a smaller number of partially selective schools in England.

== United States ==
Selective schools in the United States are typically high school level and are often also specialized schools. In New York City, students must take the competitive Specialized High Schools Admissions Test prior to possible admittance to one of eight specialized high schools. Though most selective schools are at the high school level, there are also selective schools for younger students.

== Germany ==
The German public school system is fundamentally selective after four years of elementary school. The selective Gymnasium (grades 5 through 12 or 13, depending on the state) is supposed to prepare pupils for university. The German Realschule is also a selective school, though with lower requirements, ending at grade 10.

The pros and cons of a selective school system are a constant issue in discussions about German schools, while many parents take strong efforts to make their children attend Gymnasium.

Attendance of Gymnasium had strongly increased in the second part of the 20th century to the majority of pupils in many areas. As a consequence, mainly pupils with rather low aptitudes remained for the non-selective Hauptschule, traditionally the third main tier (and originally the main tier) of the German school system. Some German federal states have abolished the three-tier system in favour of a combination of Realschule and Hauptschule, starting about 1997.

== Iran ==
National Organization for Development of Exceptional Talents (acronym: NODET or SAMPAD) governs national selective schools (middle and high school level) in Iran developed specifically for the development of exceptionally talented students. The organization was first founded in 1976, as the National Iranian Organization for Gifted and Talented Education (NIOGATE), and re-established later as NODET in 1987.

== See also ==
- Magnet school
- Specialist school
- Tracking (education)
- Ability grouping
- Differentiated instruction
- Expertise reversal effect
