= QAHS =

QAHS may refer to:

- Queen Anne High School Dunfermline, Scotland
- Queensland Academy for Health Sciences, Gold Coast, Australia
