= Queensland Academy for Creative Industries =

Queensland Academies Creative Industries Campus (QACI)

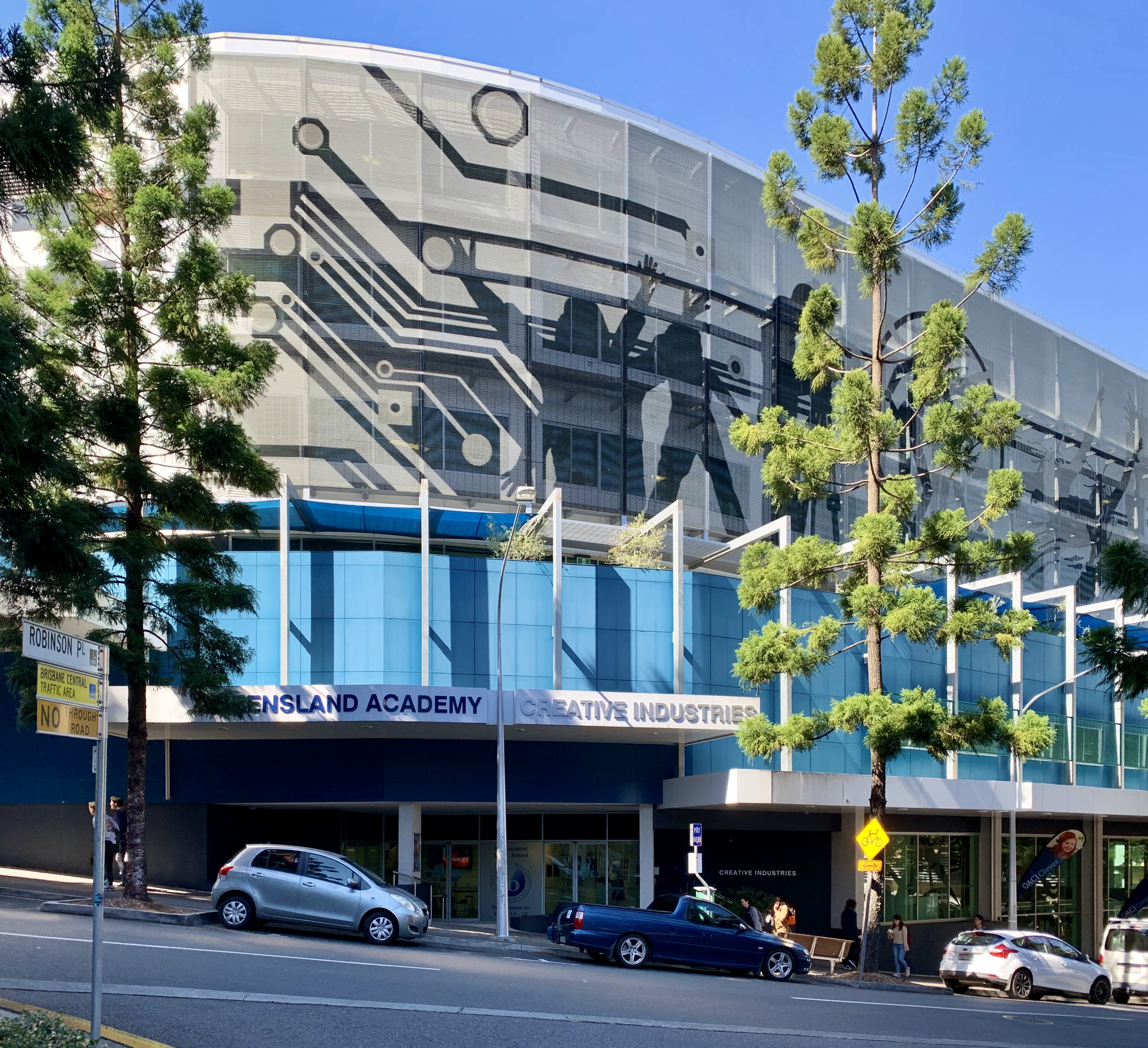

Location
- 61 Musk Ave, Kelvin Grove; Brisbane, Queensland, 4059; Australia; 27°27′09.65″S 153°00′53.20″E

Information
- Type: Public (selective)
- Established: 2007
- Principal: Shannon Carter
- Enrolment: 519 (2023)
- Houses: Éveiller, Matjiin and Vivezza
- Colour: Blues
- Website: https://qaci.eq.edu.au/

The Queensland Academies Creative Industries (QACI) is a selective entry senior state high school in Brisbane, Queensland, Australia which offers the International Baccalaureate Diploma Programme. The school aims to provide a platform for academic like-minded students wishing to study the rigorous International Baccalaureate Diploma Programme. Students are selected through an academic selective entry process including testing and interviews. It is located within the Kelvin Grove Urban Village. The Queensland Academies – Creative Industries Campus is Queensland’s first vertical school, opened in 2007.

== History ==
The creation of the Queensland Academies was announced by Premier Peter Beattie on 17 April 2005 as part of the Queensland Government's Smart State Strategy – a policy designed to foster knowledge, creativity and innovation within the state. The Creative Industries Campus subsequently opened in 2007 in partnership with the Queensland University of Technology.

== Principals ==
- Founding Principal: John Jose (2007 – July 2014)
- Previous Acting Principal: Glen Donald (July 2014 – December 2015)
- Previous Principal: Gavin Bryce (January 2016 – December 2020)
- Previous Acting Principal: Karen Casey (January 2021 – July 2021)
- Previous Principal: Gavin Bryce (July 2021 – March 2023)
- Previous Acting Principal: Mick Leigh (April 2023 – June 2024)
- Previous Principal: Gavin Bryce (July 2024 – August 2024)
- Current Principal: Shannon Carter (August 2024 – Present)

== Facilities ==
QACI is a 7-level high rise school which possesses an industry standard art gallery, film editing studios, a green room, visual art studios, a music recording studio, a dance studio, a black box theatre studio and a 360-seat performance theatre. The whole building is air conditioned. The refectory on level 4 has fridges, microwaves and hot water to accommodate students during lunch as well as two outdoor courtyards and a beanbag lounge. The academy has 4 elevators to assist with traveling around the school in addition to a digital access control system to ensure student safety and building security. The academy's Information Research Centre has a range of IB subject specific books. Students also have access to various QUT Kelvin Grove services via the academy's associate membership of the University.

The facilities are available for hire for external use, and have a moderate lamp stock for the venue. The Music recording studio is run by a company named lot 17 studios, and is also available for external hire through the company.

== Curriculum ==
Students at QACI may exclusively study the International Baccalaureate Diploma Programme (IBDP). Year 10 students at the Academy study an IB preparation program known as Pre-IB. Year 11 and 12 students then undertake the official IBDP. A student may do two Group 6 subjects instead of a science but is required to study Environmental Systems and Societies as their Group 3 subject, or a student may select two Group 4 subjects and no Group 6 subject.

Year 10 students are encouraged to take pre-IB subjects which line-up with their senior IB subjects. Year 10 subjects are not taught at SL/HL, but are rather combined. Year 10 students must take one subject from each of the following groups.

Year 10 Pre-IB Subjects (2021)
Group	Available subjects
Group 1 (Studies in Language and Literature – Primary Language)	English Language and Literature
Group 2 (Language B – Secondary Language)	French (Ab initio/Advanced), Spanish (Ab initio/Advanced), Mandarin (Ab initio/Advanced)
Group 3 (Individuals and Societies)	Business Management, Psychology, Global Politics, Science
Group 4 (Sciences)	Design Technology, Science, Second Arts Subject
Group 5 (Mathematics)	Year 10 Mathematics, Advanced Mathematics
Group 6 (The Arts)	Music, Visual Art, Theatre, Film, Dance, Second Science (i.e. DT & Science)
Extra Inner-Core Subjects	IBL

In years 11 and 12, students select one subject from each of the groups plus all of the mandatory IB components. At least three subjects must be taken at Higher Level (HL) and the remainder are taken at Standard Level (SL).

Group	Available subjects
Group 1 (Studies in Language and Literature – Primary Language)	English Language and Literature (SL/HL), School-Supported-Self-Taught Literature (SL Studied Independently)
Group 2 (Language B – Secondary Language)	English (SL/HL Studied Independently), French (Ab initio/SL/HL), Spanish (Ab initio/SL/HL), Mandarin (Ab initio/SL/HL), Non-Mainstream Language (SL/HL Studied Independently)
Group 3 (Individuals and Societies)	Environmental Systems and Societies (SL), Business and Management (SL/HL), Psychology (SL/HL), Global Politics (SL/HL)
Group 4 (Sciences)	Design Technology (SL/HL), Chemistry (SL/HL), Biology (SL/HL), Physics (SL/HL)
Group 5 (Mathematics)	Mathematics: Applications and Interpretations (SL), Mathematics: Analysis and Approaches (SL/HL)
Group 6 (The Arts)	Music (SL/HL), Visual Art (SL/HL), Theatre (HL), Film (HL), Dance (HL)
Mandatory IB Components	Theory of Knowledge (TOK), Creativity, Activity and Service (CAS), Extended Essay (EE)

== House system ==
QACI has three houses, each name represents a different cultural or language group thus reflecting QACI's global outlook.

These three houses are:

- Éveiller (green) – meaning to awaken in French
- Matjiin (red) – believed to mean create in an Australian Indigenous language
- Vivezza (yellow) – meaning liveliness in Italian.

== Partnerships ==
The Queensland Academies - Creative Industries seeks to build partnerships with leading artistic leaders and organizations. The theatre and gallery spaces are commonly used by world-renowned artists and performers to exhibit their work, intended to expose students to the potential of their art subject.

== Notable alumni ==
- Sarah McCreanor, dancer and YouTuber.

== See also ==
- Queensland Academy for Science, Mathematics and Technology
- Queensland Academy for Health Sciences
- International Baccalaureate Organisation
