= Queensland Academy for Science, Mathematics and Technology =

Queensland Academies – Science Mathematics & Technology Campus

Location
- 78 Bywong Street, Toowong; Queensland; Australia; 27.487194°S 152.979296°E

Information
- Type: Public (selective by exam)
- Motto: Inspiring Great Minds
- Established: 2007
- Principal: Kath Kayrooz
- Teaching staff: 106.3 (on an FTE basis)
- Enrolment: 1358 (2025–26)
- Campus: Toowong
- Houses: Agnesi, Curie, DaVinci, Franklin, Hawking, Hollows, Jackson and Newton
- Colours: Blue and red
- Website: https://qasmt.eq.edu.au

The Queensland Academy for Science, Mathematics and Technology (QASMT) is a selective entry high school in Toowong, Queensland, Australia. It was developed in partnership with the University of Queensland. QASMT offers the International Baccalaureate Diploma Programme to students in Year 11 and 12, and also offers the International Baccalaureate Middle Years Programme to Year 7–9 students.

The school is one of three state high schools for highly capable students in the Queensland society; the others are the Queensland Academy for Creative Industries and Queensland Academy for Health Sciences.

In 2025, Better Education ranked Queensland Academy for Science Mathematics & Technology 10th in the state of Queensland based on the percentage of students achieving in each ATAR band - 80+, 90+ and 99+ ATAR. QASMT was outside the top ten for median ATAR and percentage of students achieving 95+ ATAR.

QASMT is a 100% selective school with a socio-educational advantage index in the 99th percentile.

== History ==
As part of the Queensland Government's Smart State Strategy, which aims to foster knowledge, creativity, and innovation within QLD, Premier Peter Beattie announced the creation of the Queensland Academies on 17 April 2005. The Queensland Academy for Science Mathematics & Technology (QASMT) subsequently opened in January 2007. The University of Queensland established the school, focusing on sciences and mathematics. The site occupied by QASMT was formerly Toowong College; this location was chosen "to capitalise on its close educational and geographic links with the University of Queensland."

The site was occupied by the house known as Ormlie originally and later as Easton Gray and owned by Sir Arthur Hunter Palmer, Premier of Queensland and subsequently the residence of his brother-in-law Hugh Mosman (who discovered gold at Charters Towers). Easton Gray was sold in 1944 for the construction of Toowong State High School, later Toowong College.

In 2007, The Queensland Academy for Creative Industries (QACI) was established in partnership with the Queensland University of Technology with a focus on media, film, design and technology, music, theatre arts, and visual arts. In 2008, the Queensland Academy for Health Sciences (QAHS) was developed in partnership with Griffith University with a focus on medicine, dentistry, physiotherapy, optometry, and medical research.

The construction of the new Eastern Science, Technology, Engineering, and Mathematics building (L-Block) was completed in December 2019. The Northern Learning Centre building (M-Block) was completed in mid-2020.

== See also ==
- International Baccalaureate Organisation
- Queensland Academy for Creative Industries
- Queensland Academy for Health Sciences
- University of Queensland
