= Old Logan Village State School =

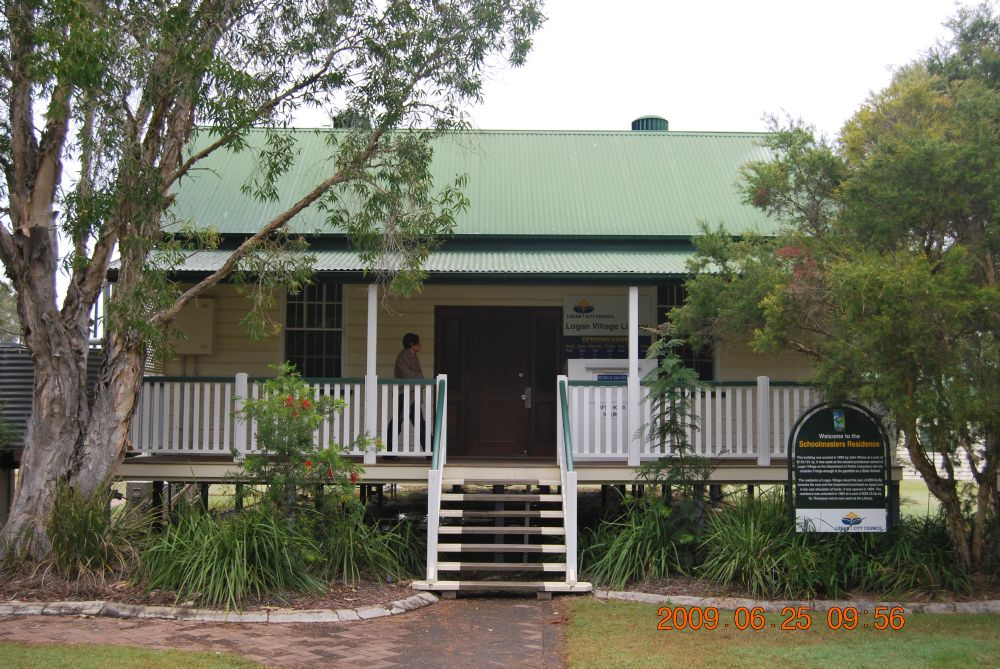
- Old Logan Village Provisional School, later teacher's residence, 2009

- Location within Queensland Location within Australia
- 27.7678°S 153.1054°E
- Location: River and Wharf Streets, Logan Village, City of Logan, Queensland, Australia

Queensland Heritage Register
- Official name: Logan Village State School and Teacher Residence (former), The Village of Logan Provisional School
- Type: state heritage (built)
- Designated: 3 December 2007
- Reference no.: 602610
- Significant period: 1900–1981

The Old Logan Village State School is a heritage-listed former state school with teacher's residence at River and Wharf Streets, Logan Village, City of Logan, Queensland, Australia. It is also known as The Village of Logan Provisional School. It was added to the Queensland Heritage Register on 3 December 2007.

== History ==
Sign in front of Old Logan Village State School, 2016

The Logan Village School was built in 1900; the teacher's residence (formally the Provisional School) is an earlier building dating from 1894. As a set, the two buildings represent the transition of educational facilities in early Queensland. The school is situated on River and Wharf Street, Logan Village. The buildings are situated a block from the Logan River and are surrounded by community sports grounds, children's play grounds and landscaped gardens using native flora.

In 1826 Captain Patrick Logan, commandant of the Moreton Bay penal colony, explored the Logan and Albert Rivers. In the 1840s it was the timber-getters in search of cedar and hardwoods that moved into the district. These were the first Europeans in this area. By the 1860s, however, many Europeans from Germany, Ireland, and England had begun to establish settlement in the district. Under the Crown Land Alienation Act of 1860 settlers could purchase agricultural land for £1 per acre, this was a direct attempt by the Queensland Government to encourage agricultural and pastoral industry as a means to increase the wealth and productivity of the young colony. It was also a way to encourage immigration to the colony. In conjunction with the Land Act the government reserved large tracts of land, known as Agricultural Reserves. These areas were surveyed into small blocks, ready for sale. One of these reserves was on the Logan River. By 1862, 68 blocks had been selected by 27 selectors in the Logan Agricultural Reserve. Those farming the Logan area found it beneficial to farm several differing crops so as to help ensure a viable and sustainable food source for the farm's inhabitants as well as a means of generating income. These smaller farms grew cotton, some sugar, maize, arrowroot, vegetables and many moved into dairying in the early twentieth century.

The Village of Logan, as it was then known, was a closer settlement that began to prosper due to successful farming and its access to the Logan River. Logan Village was considered an important commercial settlement by its surrounding stations and settlements as far away as the southern border (New South Wales). Supplies were delivered to its wharf. By 1882 the village had a ferry, a hotel, a store and a church. It also had a reserved area for the future school.

Early education in Queensland was privately conducted and at Separation of Queensland from New South Wales in 1859 there were only two National Schools, located at Warwick and Drayton, and churches ran most schools. The Education Act of 1860 created a Board of General Education for Queensland and new schools were built, local communities contributing to the cost. In 1869, provisional schools were introduced to economically solve the problem of educating children in thinly populated areas. Under this scheme, the parents of the pupils provided a simple building and the authorities paid for a teacher and books.

From 1875 Logan Village used the local church for school. As enrolments were below 30 pupils, the Queensland Government recognised this school as a Provisional School. In the same year The Education Act was passed in the Queensland Parliament providing free (and compulsory) secular education, for all children. A major problem faced by the Logan Village Provisional School, and not an uncommon one in rural areas in Queensland at this time, was attendance. Many of the enrolled students would often spend many of their days working on the family farms.

Limited Government assistance was given, such as salary assistance for a teacher and the supply of state approved books. The community had to provide the school building as well as accommodation for the teacher. By 1882 the conditions within the Provisional School classroom had become crowded and unproductive for the children. In a report from the School Inspector the small school was described in this period: "Honest work is being done in the school and work of a reliable kind, considering the unsuitable school-room and antiquated furniture". The community realised that a new school was needed; children's education was seen as extremely important to the residents of Logan Village.

An important development for the Village was the railway link from Bethania to Logan Village, completed in 1885, this brought added prosperity to the Village due to an increase in traffic and trade to the area. It also provided a direct link to Brisbane other than the often unreliable waterway. With added prosperity the Village could afford to build a brand new school building.

By 1882 the condition of Provisional Schools was an embarrassment to the Department of Public instruction and measures were introduced in an attempt to improve their standard. In some cases, such as Logan Village, the government agreed to provide half the construction costs and a recommended plan and specifications were prepared by the Department of Public Instruction. These schools could not be built within four miles of another school; this was the case with Logan Village.

In 1882 a new school was requested by the Logan Village School Committee, composed solely of community members J. Powell, T. Bishop, J. Downman, H. Watson, I. Seymor, W. Drynan, and M. Hinchcliffe as Chairman. A petition was compiled to request permission from the Department of Public Instruction to build a new school building on Crown Land situated in Wharf Street. After constant campaigning from the School Committee to the Department of Public Instruction, in 1894 permission was finally granted and the community built the wooden school building for £116, half of which was paid for by the community, the other half by the Government. The wooden building was built under the Plans and Specifications detailed by the Department of Public Instruction. By 1899 enrolments in the Provisional School reached 43 students.

In 1899 plans were drawn to build another new school building and to convert the existing one into the Teacher Residence. Enrolments had increased and more room was needed for the children. The request was submitted to the Department of Public Instruction. To have the school approved as a State School meant that the government would essentially run it, with minimal cost to the community. The Logan Village School was gazetted as a State School in September 1900, and had an attendance of 43 pupils.

The Logan Village Hotel had previously been used for the accommodation of the teacher. Departmental policy was to provide married male head teachers in country areas with residences, thereby securing a resident caretaker and cleaner for the school in the person of the headmaster's wife. The requirements laid out by the Queensland Government in relation to the Teacher Residence specified a residence have no less than two rooms and a kitchen. What had been the Provisional School was converted to the Teacher Residence in 1900.

The new school building was built from the standard plans set forth by the Department of Public Instruction. These plans had been designed by R. Ferguson, Superintendent of School Buildings. The building was to be a low set, timber framed, single skinned building. Design features included were to provide the required minimum area of eight square feet per pupil, a wide veranda at the front, a level floor throughout, lining of the walls, improved ventilation, larger and higher set windows.

At the time of the transition from Provisional to State School in Logan Village changes to the school syllabus were put in place by the Department of Public Instruction. Increased writing, drawing and activity which required more space, greater detachment and privacy for the student were being taught in Queensland schools. Educationalists recommended that "an allowance of 18 inches per scholar at each desk and bench should be some multiple of 18 inches". These specifications were met within the new State School building in Logan Village.

In 1901, the Queensland State Primary School system consisted of six classes, each extending over one and a half years. The school year was divided into three terms called "half-years", with two holidays, five weeks in summer and one week in winter. The school day was eight hours. Lesson contact time was 4 hours and 50 minutes. The core subjects were reading, writing, arithmetic, grammar, geography, history, elementary mechanics, vocal music, drill and gymnastics and, for girls, sewing and needlework. The rest of the time was spent in neatness inspections and marching.

In 1904, the Teacher Residence was further extended to accommodate the large family of the then teacher, Mr. Cooke. The price of the extensions was £59. In 1909 the underpart of the school building was asphalted. The river reserve was added to the school grounds in 1916, adding waterfront land to the school boundary.

To commemorate past students killed and wounded in the First World War an Honour Board was erected in 1918 and was placed on the south wall inside the school building.

The Logan Village State School relocated to a new site in North Street in 1981. The old school building was raised and built under to accommodate two-level use of the building for community purposes. The Teacher Residence was converted into a local library. Other historic buildings were moved onto the site as part of a heritage precinct. The river front land is now privately owned residential blocks.

== Description ==
The Old Logan Village State Primary School and its Teacher Residence consists of two buildings, the earliest (the Teacher Residence) was built in 1894, the other in 1900. The buildings are situated a block from the Logan River and are surrounded by community sports grounds, children's play grounds and landscaped gardens using native flora.

=== The Teacher Residence ===
This building was initially built as the Provisional School in 1894. It is a low set timber framed structure. In 1904 the building, then the Teacher Residence was extended. The front stairs and veranda have recently been replaced with new timber, but replicates the original stairs and veranda.

Externally, the building has weatherboard cladding, a corrugated iron double gabled roof, and is supported by steel posts. A veranda exists at the front (north) of the building, with a corrugated iron roof, central timber stair, timber posts and timber rail balustrade. There is two wooden framed windows either side of the front door that have had security bars fixed on them. The entrance door has been replaced with a modern wooden door.

The extensions can be easily identified from the outside of the building as the original, single gable roof-line, weatherboards and windows remain in the older section of the building. The 1904 extension enclosed the rear veranda of the building; this is apparent due to the inconsistent roof line as the renovations have added an extra gable at the rear.

Two wooden framed windows with timber and iron window hoods and covered ventilation windows above are built in the original part along each side of the building. Another window with a hood and no ventilation window sits beside the first on the east side. On the west side of the original building is a wide, closed doorway with no stairs to the ground. The extended part of the building has a door on the east side with a small wooden staircase to the ground. Two more windows were built into the extended building on the side and at the back, and a small set of louvers have been placed into the east wall where the present bathroom/toilet are.

Internally, the original building consisted of two large rooms, and two smaller rooms to the rear, one for a kitchen the other a bathroom, with front and back verandas, but this changed with the 1904 extensions. These changes included adding two extra rooms at the rear of the building, enclosing the rear veranda and fitting a larger kitchen area at the rear. The renovations added an extra five metres to the length of the building.

The interior of the existing building has high coved ceilings in the front two rooms. The walls and ceilings are sheeted internally by vertical wooden boarding. The boarding on the walls sits vertically; the boarding on the ceilings follows the curve of the coved ceilings. The divide between the front and middle room has been extended to provide two large rectangular arches, lined with pine wood, placed there for the ease of movement around the library. The present library utilises all the rooms, with large bookshelves and a librarian's desk. The rear room, the "kitchen", has a wooden partition built from the rear wall to the next wall in the direction of the front of the building, the ceiling boards slope at the corners to create an arched appearance. The west side of this partition once held the stove, and this is apparent due to the large panel of fibrolite placed over the stove culvert. On either side of this culvert are two small windows. Fibrolite panels have been used on the east wall of the rear room in contrast to the other three wooden board walls.

=== The State School ===
The State School building was built in 1900. It is a high set, wooden building. Originally it was low set with timber stumps until raised and built under in the 1980s.

The exterior of the building has weatherboard cladding, a corrugated iron single gabled roof. At the front (north) of the building is a veranda with a central timber stair. The stair and the floor of the veranda are not original but from the renovations in the 1980s. The rail balustrade and veranda posts are timber. There is a swinging wooden gate at the entrance of the top of the stairs. The front door is not original, but of a modern type for security purposes. Above the front door sits an original swing window, to allow extra air and light into the classroom. Two large sash windows are on either side of the front door. The front wall of the veranda consists of exposed, unlined, original timbers. The ends of the veranda have wooden spandrels. The rear (south) of the building has a central wooden staircase. On either side of this staircase are two large wooden sash windows.

The interior of the school building consists of one large room and an enclosed annex at the back, originally intended for hand basins and hats and coats. The main area of the school is a large hall with high coved ceilings. The walls are sheeted internally by wooden boarding that sits horizontally; the boarding on the ceilings follows the curve of the coved ceilings. The interior is illuminated by two sets of large, timber framed casement windows with extra top lights. The set on the west of the room are built high to sit above the blackboard. The set on the east of the room are the same size but sit lower on the parallel wall. The students were originally seated facing the west wall, where the blackboard is still situated. The set of windows on the south of the building have exterior timber and iron window hoods.

The Roll of Honour for the Logan Village School has been erected on the internal south wall. The annex sits behind this wall to the back of the building. The door to the annex is an original wooden door; a swing window identical to that on the front door sits atop. On either side of this door are two sets of wooden sash windows.

The renovation to the building in the 1980s built in underneath. A set of wooden stairs was placed internally from the annex to the ground floor. The interior of the downstairs area is tiled and the walls are plaster board. A small kitchenette has been installed on the south wall. Externally the added walls have been built with wooden boards, similar in appearance to those of the original upper part. The west side of the downstairs area has three wooden windows, the south has two, and the east side has two windows and a large wooden garage door to the rear.

The grounds of the State School and Teacher Residence hold a small toilet block situated between the two buildings. The gardens are neatly landscaped with many native trees, shrubs and grasses.

== Heritage listing ==
The Old Logan Village State School and its Teacher Residence were listed on the Queensland Heritage Register on 3 December 2007 having satisfied the following criteria.

The place is important in demonstrating the evolution or pattern of Queensland's history.

The former Logan Village State School and Teacher Residence, that opened in 1900, reflects the development of, and changes in, Primary Education in Queensland. As a public building the school is a record of the development of the Logan Village area and the growth of, and changes to, the Logan Village Community. As a set of buildings it is an example of the successful transition that occurred in many areas of early Queensland as the Government's education policies succeeded, from Provisional School to State School.

The place is important because of its aesthetic significance.

As timber buildings built in a traditional style, the former Logan State School and Teacher Residence make a substantial contribution to the built character of Logan Village.

The place has a strong or special association with a particular community or cultural group for social, cultural or spiritual reasons.

The former Logan Village State School and Teacher Residence has a long association with the community of Logan Village and the surrounding areas as an important component of a public educational facility for many years.
