= Brisbane South Girls and Infants School =

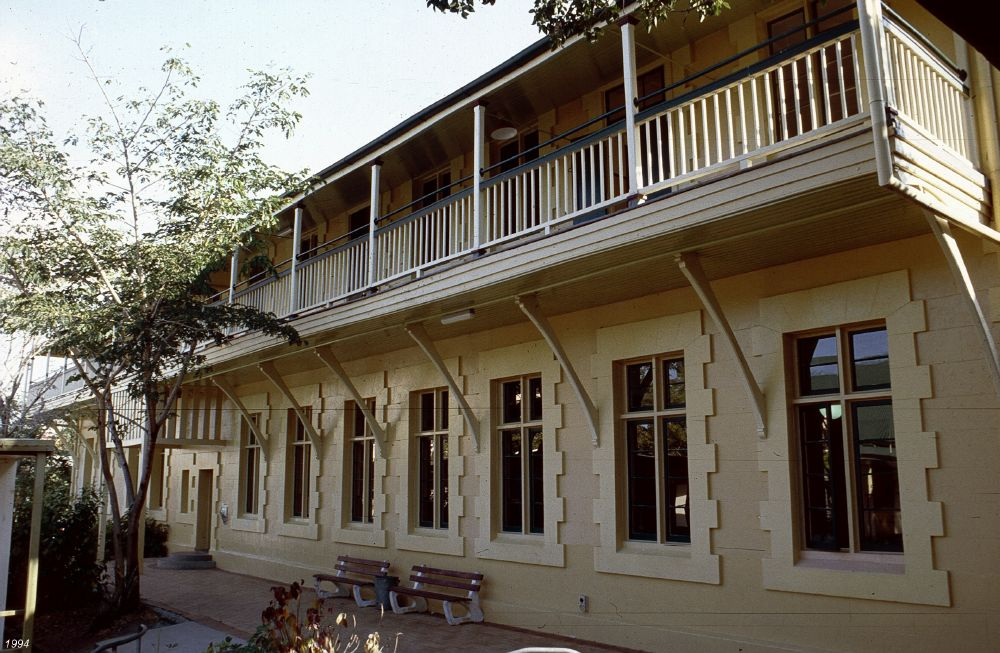
- Brisbane State High School, Block H, 1994

- Location within Queensland Location within Australia
- 27.4795°S 153.0188°E
- Location: 112 Merivale Street, South Brisbane, Queensland, Australia

History
- Design period: 1840s–1860s (mid-19th century)
- Built: 1864–1932

Queensland Heritage Register
- Official name: Brisbane State High School, Block H, Brisbane South Girls and Infants School, Brisbane South Intermediate School, South Brisbane Primary School
- Type: state heritage (built)
- Designated: 31 October 1994
- Reference no.: 601222
- Significant period: 1860s (historical); 1930s (historical); 1860s–1930s (fabric school); 1910s (fabric teachers' rooms)
- Significant components: school/school room, staffroom/s / teachers' room/s / teachers' retiring room/s

Brisbane South Girls and Infants School is a heritage-listed state school at 112 Merivale Street, South Brisbane, Queensland, Australia. It was built from 1864 to 1932. It is also known as Brisbane South Intermediate School, South Brisbane Primary School, and currently as Brisbane State High School Block H. It was added to the Queensland Heritage Register on 31 October 1994.

== History ==
Brisbane State High School's Block H, a two-storeyed brick building which is now part of the Junior School, is one of the oldest state school buildings in Queensland. The core was constructed in 1864 as the South Brisbane Primary School, with key extensions erected in 1877 and 1932.

The building is associated with the early establishment of general education in Queensland. It was erected under the new Education Act of 1860, which brought all Queensland schools under a Board of General Education, and provided for a system of government-subsidised primary schools, similar to the system then operating in New South Wales (which in turn had been based on the Irish system of National Schools). Under Queensland's Education Act, communities were required to contribute one-third of the cost of construction of new school buildings. Only six primary school buildings were erected in the period 1861–63, parents finding the one-third contribution difficult to raise. This led to some relaxation of the regulation, and in 1864, eleven schools, including the South Brisbane Primary School, were constructed. Of the 17 primary school buildings erected between 1861 and 1864, the only ones known to remain are Gayndah State School (1861), South Brisbane (1864) and Warwick East State School (1864), all of which are brick buildings.

Moves to establish a school at South Brisbane commenced in 1860, and in November 1861 the Queensland Government granted to the Board of General Education, 2 acres (0.81 ha) of land fronting Cordelia and Merivale Streets, for school purposes. Subscriptions took some time to raise, and in April 1863, a primary school was established in temporary, overcrowded accommodation at the Mechanics Institute in Stanley Street. The colonial government had approved the application for a new school in February 1863, and had employed Brisbane architect Charles Porter to prepare plans, but delayed calling tenders until December 1863, waiting for the School Committee to raise the one-third contribution.

Porter was the first architect for the Board of General Education, and his work for it included the design of the Normal School at North Brisbane, and schools at Little Ipswich, Ipswich State School, and Gladstone. The plan for the South Brisbane school may have been duplicated from that of the Ipswich School.

The contract was let in August 1864 to Brisbane contractor Charles Beauchamp, with a tender of £1050, and the building was completed in time for the commencement of the new school year on 23 January 1865. Although designed by Charles Porter, Brisbane architect Benjamin Backhouse was employed to supervise the construction.

The two-storey brick building was rectangular in plan, and designed to accommodate 300 pupils. Each floor comprised one large room, with boys on the ground floor, and girls and infants on the upper floor. The unrendered building had a shingled roof, and projecting porch and balconies on the front facade to Merivale Street. The staircase and hat rooms were at the rear of the building.

By the 1870s, South Brisbane was rivalling North Brisbane in importance as a commercial and residential area, and the accompanying population increase put pressure on the accommodation at the South Brisbane Primary School. At least one playshed (no longer extant) had been erected by 1873, and in 1874 a balcony was added to the rear of the school building, for girls and infants. In the second half of 1877, substantial additions were made with the construction of a two-storey brick wing at right-angles to the rear of the building. This provided two new classrooms, each about 30 by 20 feet (9.1 by 6.1 m), with exterior stairs. The contractor was P Nott, with a price of £725.

South Brisbane, with its busy wharves and commercial sector, continued to expand in the boom years of the 1880s, and the district population trebled. During this decade the school playground, much of which comprised low-lying swampy ground, was filled and levelled, partly using rock excavated in 1884 for the second stage of the South Brisbane Dry Dock. Early in 1888 the shingled roof of the school building was replaced with corrugated iron sheeting.

By the late 1880s, overcrowding at the South Brisbane Primary School had reached a critical stage. In 1888 the Department of Public Instruction decided to divide the school, which had already been operating as two separate departments. A new building was erected on the other side of Merivale Street, at the corner of Glenelg Street, and this became Brisbane South Boys School. South Brisbane Primary School was closed, then re-opened as Brisbane South Girls & Infants School.

Comparatively few changes were made to the Girls & Infants School in the following three decades. About 1914 a small, single-storey, timber retiring room for staff was erected on the northern side of the 1877 wing, and c. 1917 this room was duplicated on the southern side. (These two small buildings have since been re-located about 20 metres (66 ft) to the south against Cordelia Street.) New windows were installed in the rear wing in 1927.

By the late 1920s, South Brisbane's heyday was over. The progressive City of South Brisbane had been absorbed in 1925 by the new City of Brisbane, and South Brisbane had lost much of its civic focus. Many of the larger residences were being converted into flats by the mid-1920s, and young families were moving to the less crowded workers' dwellings suburbs, like Annerley, Greenslopes and Coorparoo. Enrolments at both Brisbane South Girls & Infants School and Brisbane South Boys School were declining.

In December 1928, Department of Public Instruction approval was given for alterations costing £1,000 to the Girls & Infants School, for conversion to an Intermediate School. On 31 December 1928, the two existing South Brisbane state schools were closed, and on 1 January 1929, the former Boys School was re-opened as the combined Brisbane South State School. At the former Girls & Infants School, the exterior walls were rendered, the rooms were partitioned, and the front porch was removed, and the building was re-opened in August 1929 as Brisbane South Intermediate School. In 1930, plans were prepared to extend the 1864 wing of the Brisbane South Intermediate School by an additional four bays to the southeast, virtually doubling its size. The contract for this work was let in 1932, at a cost of £1430.

Intermediate schools, equipped with workshops, laboratories, and domestic science rooms, were established in principal Queensland towns after 1928. They reflected a fundamental change in Queensland education policy in the late 1920s, focussing on syllabus revision and the education of children over 11 years of age. In Brisbane, Intermediate schools were established as separate institutions, but in country areas, they formed part of existing high schools. They catered for children 12–13 years of age, offering a two-year course as a link between primary and secondary education. Setting up new schools for a two-year course proved expensive, and the Intermediate school concept was replaced in the 1940s and 1950s by multilateral high schools offering a variety of courses. Brisbane South Intermediate School was closed on 31 December 1953.

In the late 1940s, the deteriorating condition of the Brisbane South State Primary School building (erected 1888), had prompted proposals either to close the school, or to transfer to another site. The decision was postponed for some years, but by March 1954, the cost of repairs to the 1888 building was considered too great, and recommendation was made to transfer the school to the premises formerly occupied by the Brisbane South Intermediate School. In August 1954, Brisbane South State School re-occupied the premises vacated by the Girls & Infants School 25 years before. At this time, nearby Brisbane State High School was using two rooms and the laboratory on the top floor of the building; it was anticipated that the High School would vacate these rooms in 1955, but it is not clear whether this eventuated.

With student numbers continuing to decline, Brisbane South Primary School was closed permanently on 31 December 1963, after more than one hundred years of operation. The school premises, also close to a century old, subsequently became part of the High School, and were used mainly for domestic science and manual training classes. The building was refurbished in 1989 as Brisbane State High School's Junior School, and further work was carried out in 1991. The former primary school building and the teachers' retiring rooms continue as part of the high school campus in 2014.

== Description ==
Brisbane State High School, Block H is a two-storey rendered brick building with steeply pitched corrugated iron gable roofs. It stands within a complex of school buildings which includes two small timber pavilions, the former teachers' retiring rooms, which were once attached to verandahs of an 1877 wing former primary school building.

Constructed in three primary stages, the former primary school building comprises a main north-east facing wing (constructed in 1864 and 1932), with a smaller wing projecting to the south-west (1877). In the main building, a stairwell and main entrance divides the 1864 section to the north-west from the 1932 section to the south-east. The 1877 section projects out from the centre of the 1864 section. The building has full-length timber verandahs to each long side.

The principal frontage to the north-east is decorated with toothed windows surrounds and quoins, and has large carved brackets supporting the verandah. The ground floor entry is marked with battened panels over a porch. The verandah has a timber balustrade and square timber posts with square capitals supporting a skillion roof. The skillion is timber-lined and the verandah soffit has a timber battened ceiling. The south-western frontage of the main building is clad in weatherboard with internally exposed framing and small openings. The building has large casement windows and timber French doors with fanlights with timber mullions opening onto the verandahs.

The 1877 wing has similarly detailed verandahs, windows and doors to the main building, but opening surrounds are not decorated. The upper floor has a row of large casement windows facing south-east, and smaller windows to the north west.

The gable end of the 1864 section has windows with toothed surrounds, whilst the 1932 and 1877 sections have gable ends without openings or decoration.

The main building contains five classrooms on each level, three belong to the 1864 section, and two to the 1932 section. The building has two sets of concrete stairs with timber balustrades; the main entrance stair and another in the north-western corner of the building. The ground floor classrooms in the main wing have timber lined ceilings, and are separated by timber folding partitions. The upper floor classrooms have timber floors, timber-lined ceilings with raked sides, and partially exposed trusses. The south-western verandah has a timber-lined ceiling with exposed rafters, which butts against fixed-on-the-diagonal, timber-lined gable end where the rear wing intersects the main wing. The 1877 building has a single large classroom on each level. The ground floor room has a timber-lined ceiling, whilst the first floor room has timber floors, exposed timber trusses and a diagonally boarded ceiling.

The teachers' retiring rooms, now detached from the former primary school buildings, are located about 20 metres (66 ft) to its south against Cordelia Street. These two buildings are single room, weatherboard buildings with corrugated iron half-gabled roofs, sitting on painted concrete stumps with timber battening. The half-gables have shaped barge boards and battened panels with louvred vents behind. The rooms have central solid timber doors reached by timber stairs, and single casement windows on two faces, with sunhoods which extend out from the roof and have lattice side panels and timber brackets. The buildings are virtually identical, with the exception of a high window on the southern building. Internally they are lined with vertically jointed timber, and have timber boarded ceilings with partly raked edges.

== Heritage listing ==
The former Brisbane South Girls and Infants School, now Block H of Brisbane State High School, was listed on the Queensland Heritage Register on 31 October 1994 having satisfied the following criteria.

The place is important in demonstrating the evolution or pattern of Queensland's history.

The building is one of the oldest state school buildings in Queensland, and was associated with the early development of a system of general education in Queensland following separation from New South Wales in 1859. It illustrates the development of South Brisbane, as reflected in the 1877 additions and in the 1888 separation of the boys and girls schools.

The place demonstrates rare, uncommon or endangered aspects of Queensland's cultural heritage.

It is a rare example of a two-storeyed 1860s brick school building with several extensions, and has remained coherent in form and detail.

The place is important in demonstrating the principal characteristics of a particular class of cultural places.

It is a rare example of a two-storeyed 1860s brick school building with several extensions, and has remained coherent in form and detail. The alterations and extensions carried out in 1929–32 are important evidence of the implementation of the Intermediate School system, experimented with by the Queensland Department of Public Instruction during the interwar years.

The place is important because of its aesthetic significance.

The 1910s teachers' retiring rooms are skilfully detailed modest pavilions.
