= Queensland Academy for Health Sciences =

Queensland Academies – Health Sciences Campus

Location
- 102 Edmund Rice Drive, Southport; Gold Coast, Queensland; 27.966706°S 153.383086°E

Information
- School type: Public (selective entry)
- Established: 28 January 2008
- Principal: Vanessa Rebgetz
- Staff: 34
- Grades: 10–12
- Enrolment: 360
- Language: English
- Colours: Blues and green
- Office Hours: 8:00am to 4:00pm
- Website: https://qahs.eq.edu.au

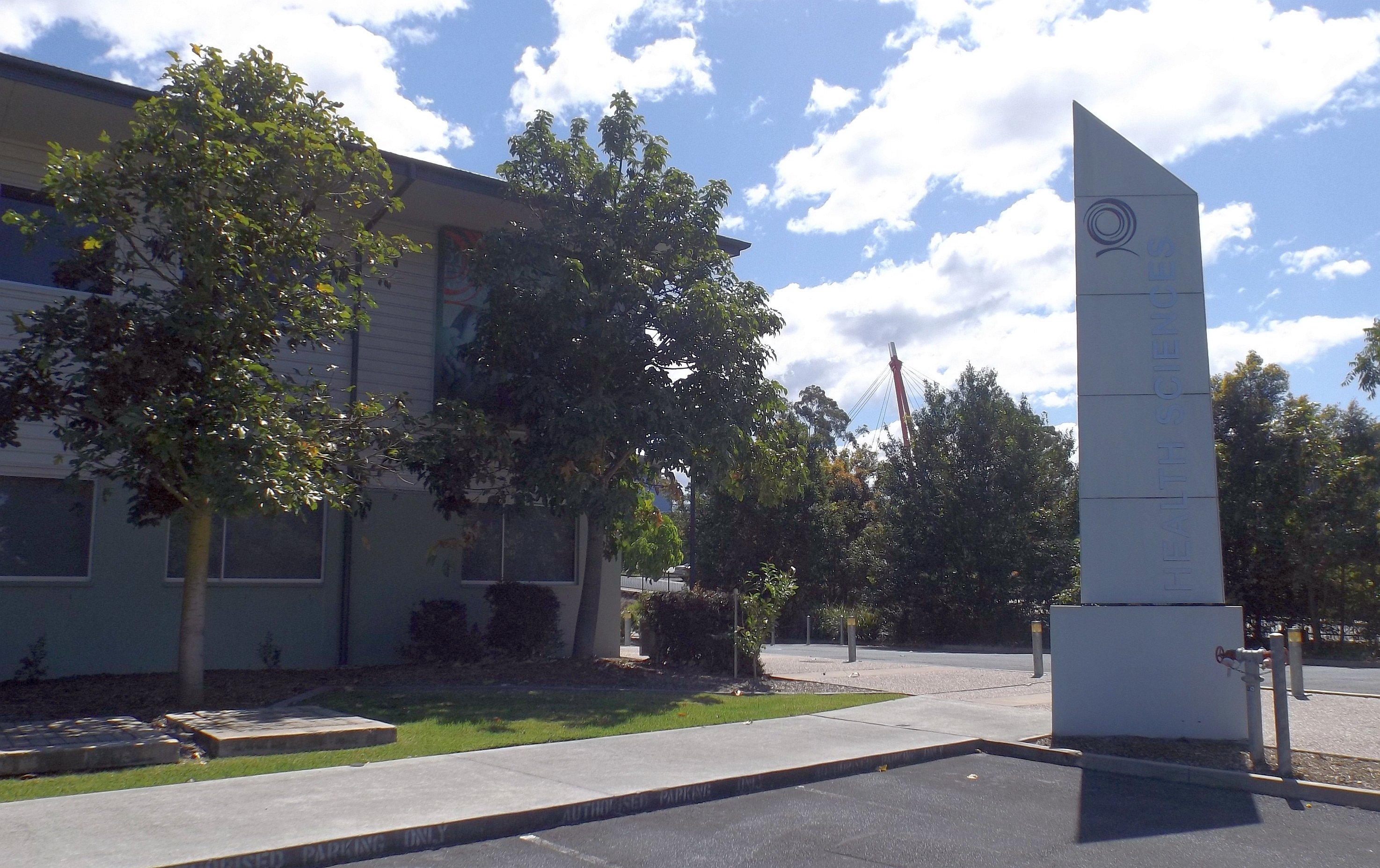
Sign and buildings along Edmund Rice Drive, 2015

The Queensland Academies – Health Sciences Campus (QAHS) is a Queensland State Government selective entry high school located on the Gold Coast in Queensland, Australia. QAHS offers the International Baccalaureate Diploma Program to students in years 11 and 12, and is also open to year 10 students, who study a preparation program for the IBDP. The school aims to attract students wanting to enter the scientific, medical and health-related industries, and is only open to the state's 'best and brightest high school students'.

In 2017, Better Education ranked Queensland Academy for Health Sciences as the #1 school in the state of Queensland based on OP/IBD results.

== History ==
On 17 April 2005, the then premier of Queensland, Peter Beattie announced the creation of the Queensland Academies "as an innovative alternative educational program for high achieving high school students".

QAHS first opened on Tuesday 29 January in time for the commencement of the 2008 Australian school year. The following day, an Official Opening Ceremony was held in the school's Lecture Theatre, which was attended by the foundation principal Leanne Nixon, the foundation deputy principal Jane Sleeman, and dignitaries including the then current Queensland Premier Anna Bligh and Education Minister Rod Welford.

== Student Entry ==
The Queensland Academy for Health Sciences is currently offering entry for Year 9 students preparing to enter Year 10.

Student entry to QAHS is a two-phase process. Firstly, students complete an entry exam, which is generally held between June and August in locations throughout Queensland. Special requests to sit the exam outside of these test locations can also be made for people who live in rural areas or cities outside of Queensland. Successful students then move on to an interview with Education Queensland staff. Students who are successful in the interview will receive an invitation to attend the Academy.

All throughout the year, advertisement campaigns both physically, such as on Public Transport, and digitally, such as on the radio and Internet, are used to attract students wishing to enter the Academy for the following year.

== Facilities ==
The QAHS campus features modern architecture classrooms, seven university standard science laboratories, a multimedia suite, a sports and recreation centre and a 500-seat lecture theatre. In addition to this, students are also able to have full access to facilities. The refectory includes hot water, a refrigerator and microwave ovens for student use. The library has books, student resources, printer access, as well as a green room for private study and a collaborative learning area for group study. There is also a discussion room for small groups to work on projects or hold tutorials.

== Use of Technology ==
All students who enter the Academy are required to obtain a laptop for use in their classes. All classrooms on the QAHS campus have data projectors as well as whiteboards, allowing teachers to conduct their classes more efficiently, and engage their students in different ways compared to traditional schools. Every class room is now fitted with a digital "Smart Board." The school features smart-card access to most exterior main doors as well as the interior doors inside the science laboratories for higher security. The entire campus also features wireless Internet access and audio loops.

== Curriculum ==
Because of the selective nature of student entry, the two-year International Baccalaureate courses studied at QAHS is fast-tracked. Year 10 students at the Academy study an accelerated version of the IB Middle Years Program and begin their Year 11 education in Term 4.

A variety of subjects are currently offered at the Academy which are aimed to provide all students with a balanced and solid foundation entering health science, and other high-level university fields. As per the rules of the International Baccalaureate, one subject from each of the groups must be studied. However, students may study another subject from either Group 3 or Group 4 (in place of a Group 6 subject).

Group	Available Subjects
Group 1 (Studies in Language and Literature – Primary Language)	English Language and Literature (SL/HL)
Group 2 (Language B – Secondary Language)	French (Ab initio/SL/HL), Mandarin (Ab initio/SL/HL), Spanish (Ab initio/SL/HL)
Group 3 (Individuals and Societies)	Business Management (SL/HL), Economics (HL), Psychology (SL/HL)
Group 4 (Sciences)	Biology (SL/HL), Chemistry (SL/HL), Physics (HL), Sports, Exercise and Health Science (HL), Computer Science (SL)
Group 5 (Mathematics)	Analysis and Approaches (SL/HL), Applications and Interpretations (HL/SL)
Group 6 (The Arts)	Music (HL)

== House system ==
House Logos

From 2010, QAHS introduced a house system. Students can gain points for their house from entry into various academic and sporting competitions, challenges and events both at the Academy, locally or nationally. There is a trophy at the end of the year for the house with the most points.

There are four houses:

- Aqua (water) – Blue
- Ignis (fire) – Red
- Terra (earth) – Green
- Ventus (wind) – Yellow

The current holder of the House Trophy is Ventus.

== See also ==
- List of schools in Queensland
- Queensland Academy for Creative Industries
- Queensland Academy for Science, Mathematics and Technology
