= Fewings =

Fewings is a surname. Notable people with the surname include:

- Eliza Ann Fewings (1857–1940), English teacher
- James Fewings (1849–1920), British cricketer
- Jo Stone-Fewings (born 1967), British actor
- Paul Fewings (born 1978), British footballer
