= Baptist City Tabernacle =

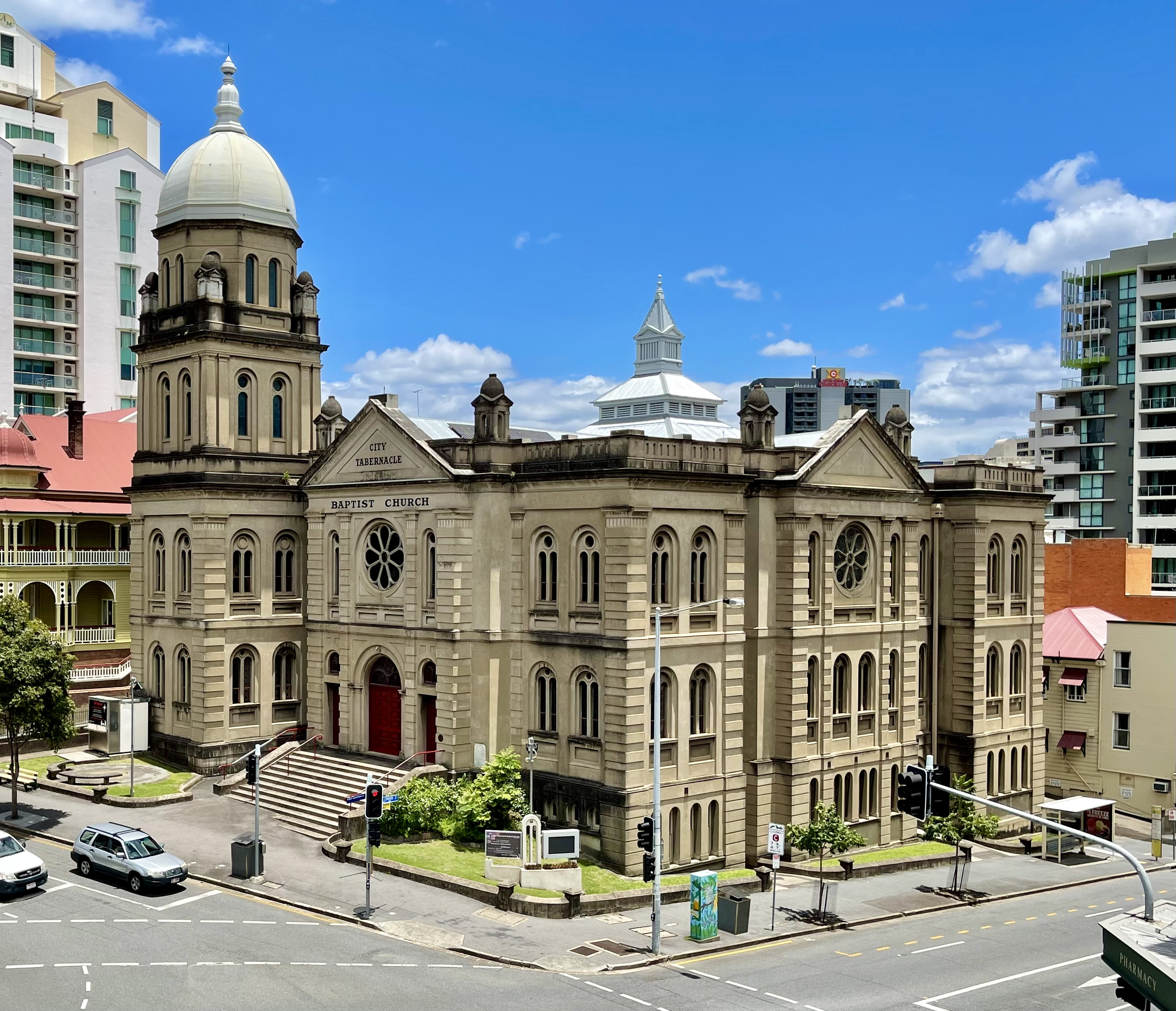
- Baptist City Tabernacle, 2020
- Baptist City Tabernacle
- 27.4646°S 153.0247°E
- Address: 163 Wickham Terrace, Spring Hill, Brisbane, Queensland
- Country: Australia
- Denomination: Baptist
- Website: citytabernacle.com

History
- Status: Church
- Dedicated: 9 October 1890

Architecture
- Architect: Richard Gailey
- Architectural type: Church
- Style: Classicism
- Years built: c. 1889–1890
- Construction cost: £18,000

Specifications
- Materials: Rendered cement; galvanised iron

Queensland Heritage Register
- Official name: Baptist City Tabernacle
- Type: State heritage (built)
- Designated: 21 October 1992
- Reference no.: 600175
- Significant period: 1889–1890 (fabric)
- Significant components: Furniture/fittings, gallery, tower, hall

Baptist City Tabernacle is a heritage-listed Baptist church at 163 Wickham Terrace, Spring Hill, Brisbane, Queensland, Australia. It was designed by Richard Gailey and built from c. 1889 to 1890. It was added to the Queensland Heritage Register on 21 October 1992. The church is affiliated with the Australian Baptist Ministries.

== History ==
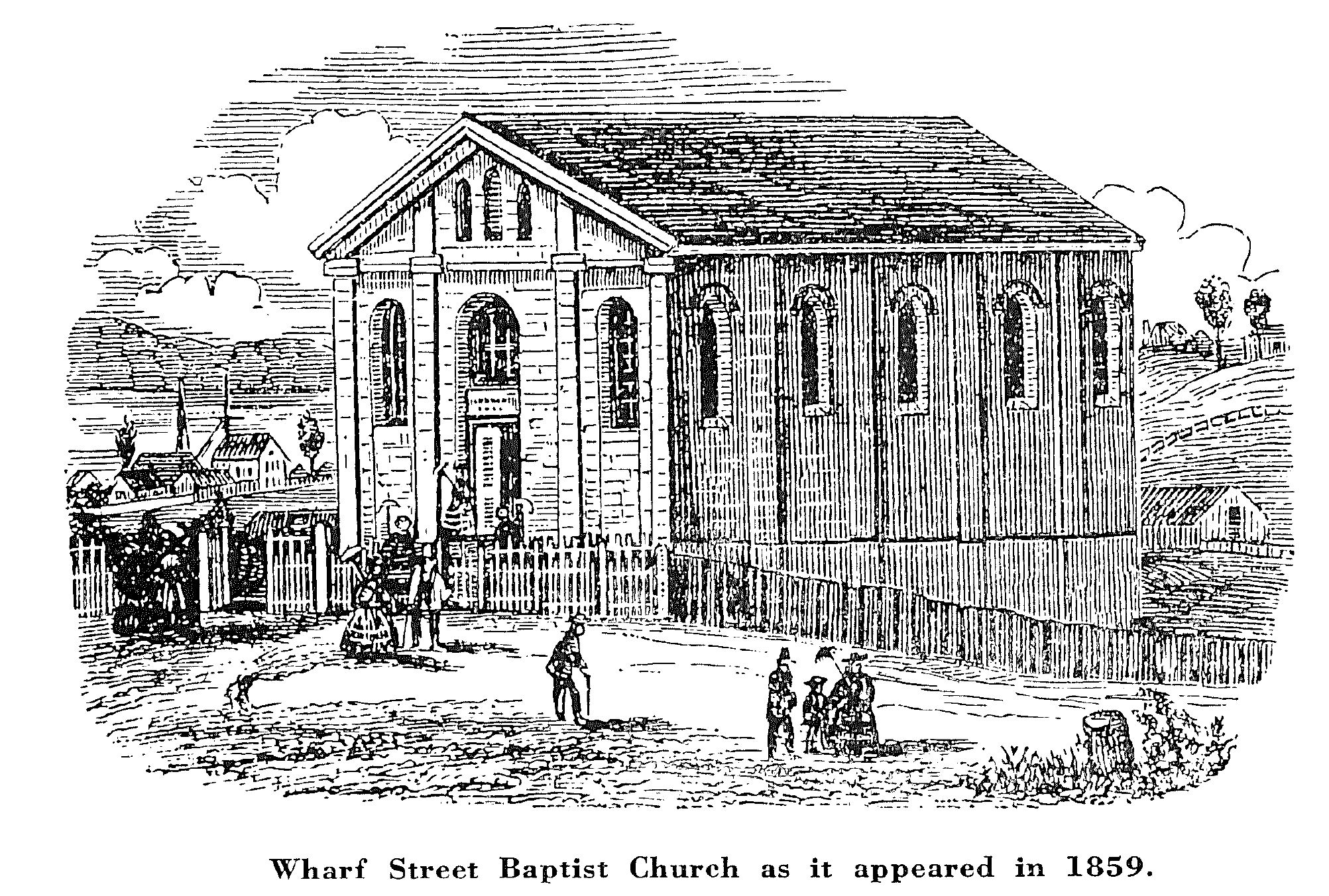
Wharf Street Baptist Church, 1859

The Baptist City Tabernacle is a large cement rendered church on a corner site overlooking the central business district.

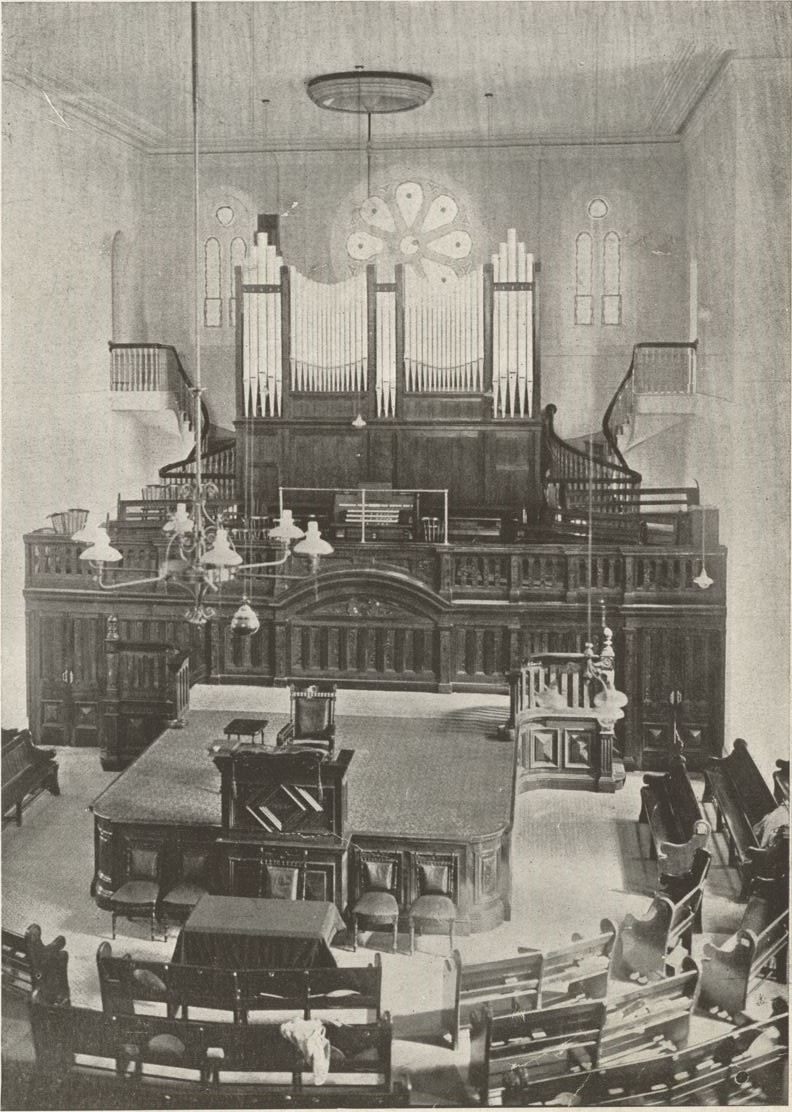
New 'Carnegie' organ, 1915

Baptists first arrived in Brisbane about 1851 with the first Baptist church, the Wharf Street Baptist Church, being built in 1859 on the corner of Wharf and Adelaide Street. By 1887, with a congregation of over 400, a new church was needed. Prominent Brisbane architect Richard Gailey, a member of the congregation, designed both the Tabernacle and the former manse which still survives on an adjacent site. The dedication took place on 9 October 1890 and the total cost was over £18,000. It was described at the time as being a Classic Venetian style building.

The first pastor was Rev. William Whale, a notable Brisbane churchman, leader and preacher of the time. In the early 1900s, Miss Fewing's Private School for Girls, which later became Somerville House, occupied the basement. The Baptist Theological College was formed in the tower and occupied it for many years, along with the minister's fraternal for use as a meeting place. The basement rooms provided space for the Sunday School, and related church activities.

In 1915, a Carnegie organ was installed.

The Tabernacle is the major centre for the Baptist Church in Queensland and site for the annual Assembly and other Union functions. It was for many years the administrative headquarters for the Baptist Union.

== List of ministers ==
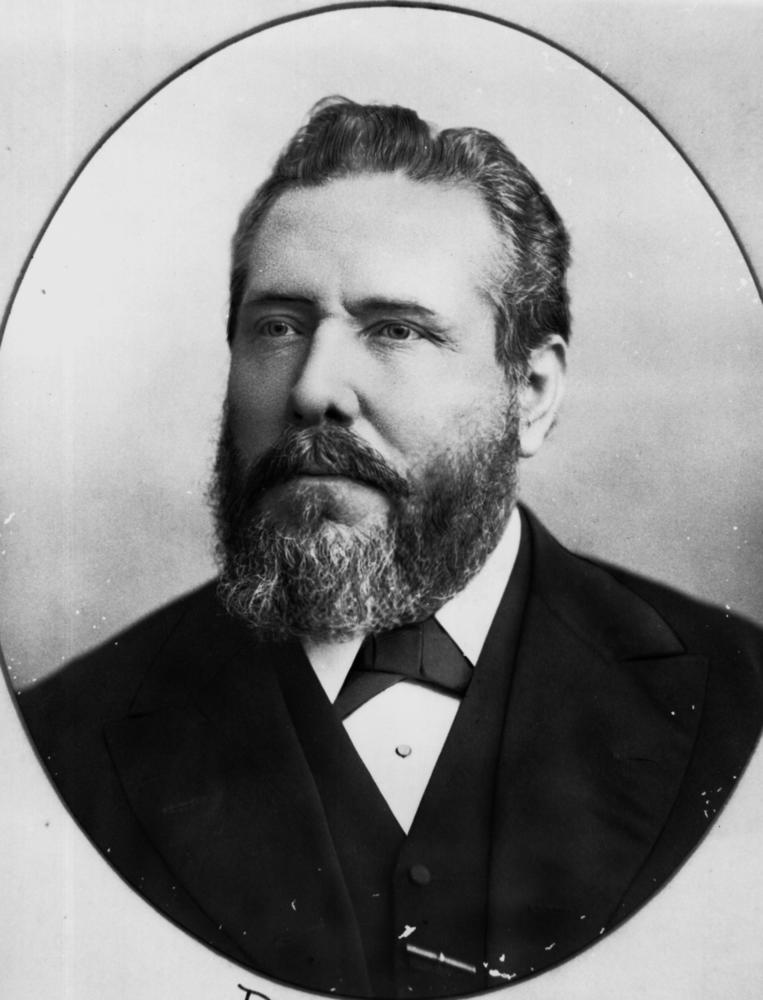
Reverend William Whale

This list is incomplete.

Wharf Street

- B. G. Wilson, M.B. September 1858 – February 1878
- Henry Coombs 1878 – September 1885
- William Whale October 1885

Wickham Terrace

- William Whale – September 1903 (died)
- George M. Rice October 1904 – October 1908 (resigned)
- James Mursell July 1909 – March 1915 (resigned)
- W. G. Pope August 1916 – April 1926 (retired)
- James Mursell 1926 – 1927
- W. E. Hurst April 1927 – March 1934 (resigned August 1934)
- Albert Butler November 1935 – 1947 (died)
- F. T. Smith May 1948 –

== Description ==
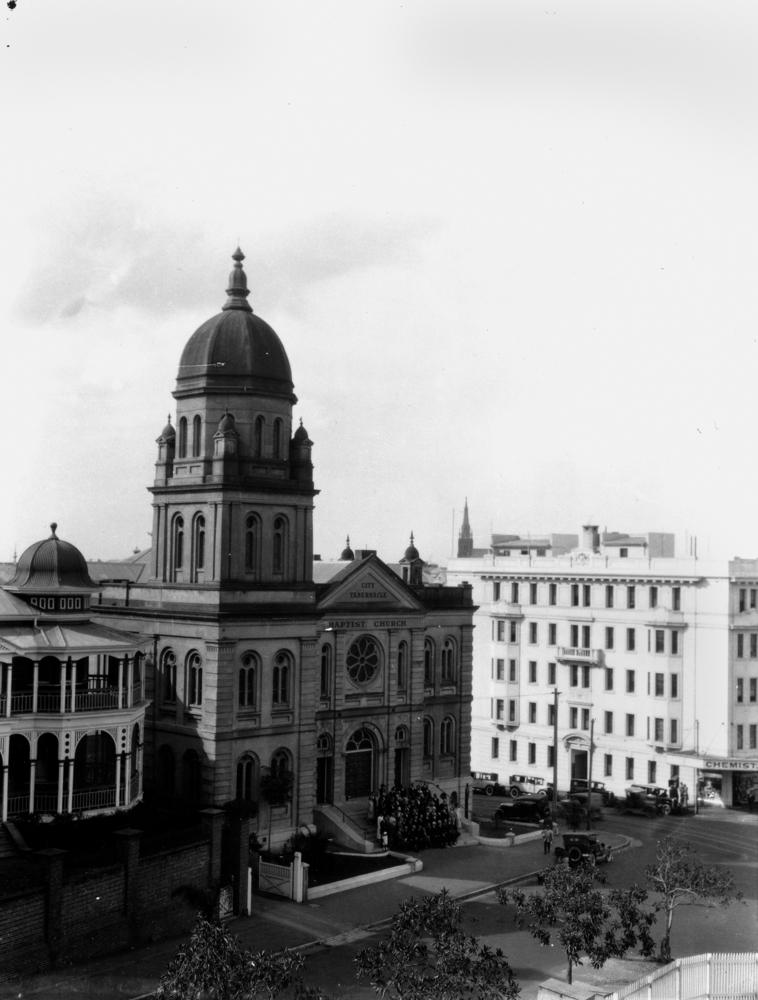
Four storey tower and cupola, circa 1929

This centrally planned church is a cement rendered brick building with parapet walls that conceal a galvanised corrugated iron roof. It is situated on a sloping site on the corner of Upper Edward Street and Wickham Terrace, overlooking the central business district, with the main entrance on the higher Wickham Terrace side.

The front facade is distinguished by centrally positioned entry stairs and an attached tower, surmounted by a cupola, that is prominently located on the southwest corner, the highest part of the site. With the exception of the four-storey tower, the building is two storeys tall and sits on a base that forms a third storey, visible at the rear and sides.

All four facades are composed of variations of the same classically derived elements and motifs and are symmetrical except for the location of the tower. Each facade is divided into three bays, the central bay being larger than the two peripheral bays.

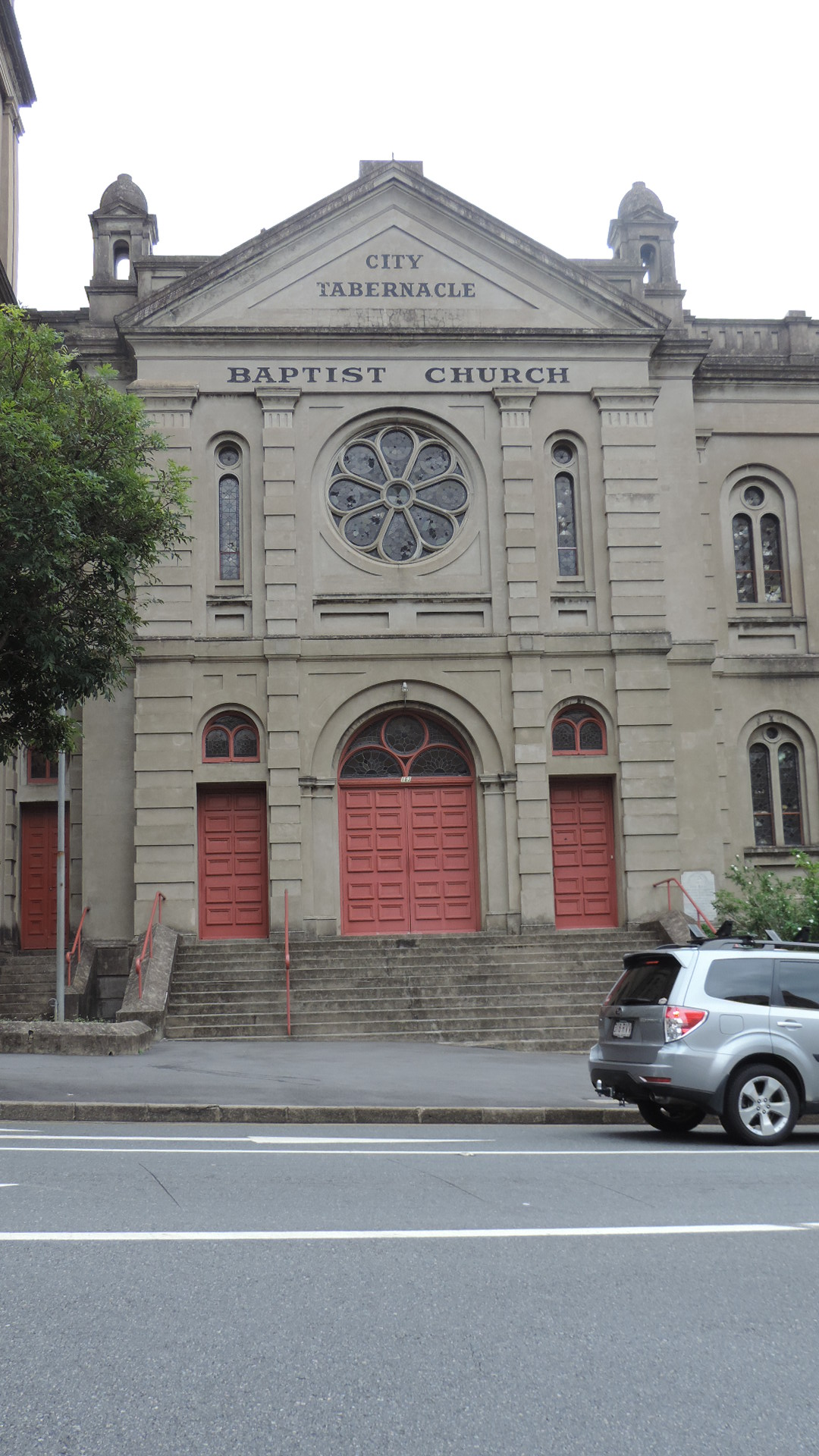
Rose window over the front entrance, 2015

The central bay sits proud on the front and rear elevations and recedes slightly on the east and west elevations. Each central bay is further divided into three parts and has a rose window in the centre of the upper level. All other openings are arched. On the south, east and west facades the central bay is surmounted by a triangular pediment. Corners and compositional divisions in the facade are marked by banded rustication and rusticated pilasters.

The longer east and west elevations have two additional bays recessed between the two main bays. In these recesses are arched entry doors that open onto the lower-ground floor. On this level are the Sunday school rooms, lecture hall, kitchen and meeting rooms.

On the ground level above, the entry vestibule opens onto the double height space of the church; a 70-foot (21 m) wide space which is spanned by timber trusses that are concealed by a flat plaster ceiling. In the corners of the building are two-storeyed rooms that look into this space, as does the gallery located over the vestibule. Internal walls are plastered and contain built-in circular cast iron ventilation grates. Decoration is restrained with the windows containing geometric patterned leadlight.

Cedar pews are arranged in a semicircular pattern facing the pulpit, baptistery, organ and choir gallery that are located at the northern end of the space and feature timber panelling. A screen has been built behind the choir. This screen blocks the original view from the auditorium of the north wall with its rose and arched windows and the spiralling timber stairs.

== Heritage listing ==
Baptist City Tabernacle was listed on the Queensland Heritage Register on 21 October 1992 having satisfied the following criteria.

The place is important in demonstrating the evolution or pattern of Queensland's history.

The Baptist City Tabernacle, as the home of Brisbane's oldest Baptist congregation, is important in demonstrating the evolution of the Baptist Church in Queensland.

The place is important because of its aesthetic significance.

The Baptist City Tabernacle is important in exhibiting a range of aesthetic characteristics valued by the community, in particular it is significant for its contribution to the Brisbane townscape, Wickham Terrace and Upper Edward Street Streetscapes and as a city landmark. The composition of the building's architectural elements and the quality and craftsmanship of the timber joinery and leadlight contribute the Baptist City Tabernacle's aesthetic significance.

The place has a strong or special association with a particular community or cultural group for social, cultural or spiritual reasons.

The Baptist City Tabernacle has a strong association with the Baptist Church, in Queensland, and has a special association with notable Brisbane architect Richard Gailey, as a major example of his ecclesiastical work.

The place has a special association with the life or work of a particular person, group or organisation of importance in Queensland's history.

The Baptist City Tabernacle has a strong association with the Baptist Church, in Queensland, and has a special association with notable Brisbane architect Richard Gailey, as a major example of his ecclesiastical work.
