= Normanhurst School, Ashfield =

Independent school for girl in Sydney, Australia

Normanhurst School

Location
- Ashfield, New South Wales; Australia
- Coordinates: 33°53′11″S 151°07′45″E

Information
- Type: Independent, girls'
- Denomination: Non-denominational
- Established: 1882
- Founder: Ellen Clarke
- Status: Closed
- Closed: 1941

The Normanhurst School was an independent, non-denominational, day and boarding school for girls that operated in Ashfield, in the Inner Western suburbs of Sydney, New South Wales, Australia.

Despite being non-denominational, the Normanhurst school maintained close links with St John's Anglican Parish, which was situated in the vicinity of the school.

== History ==
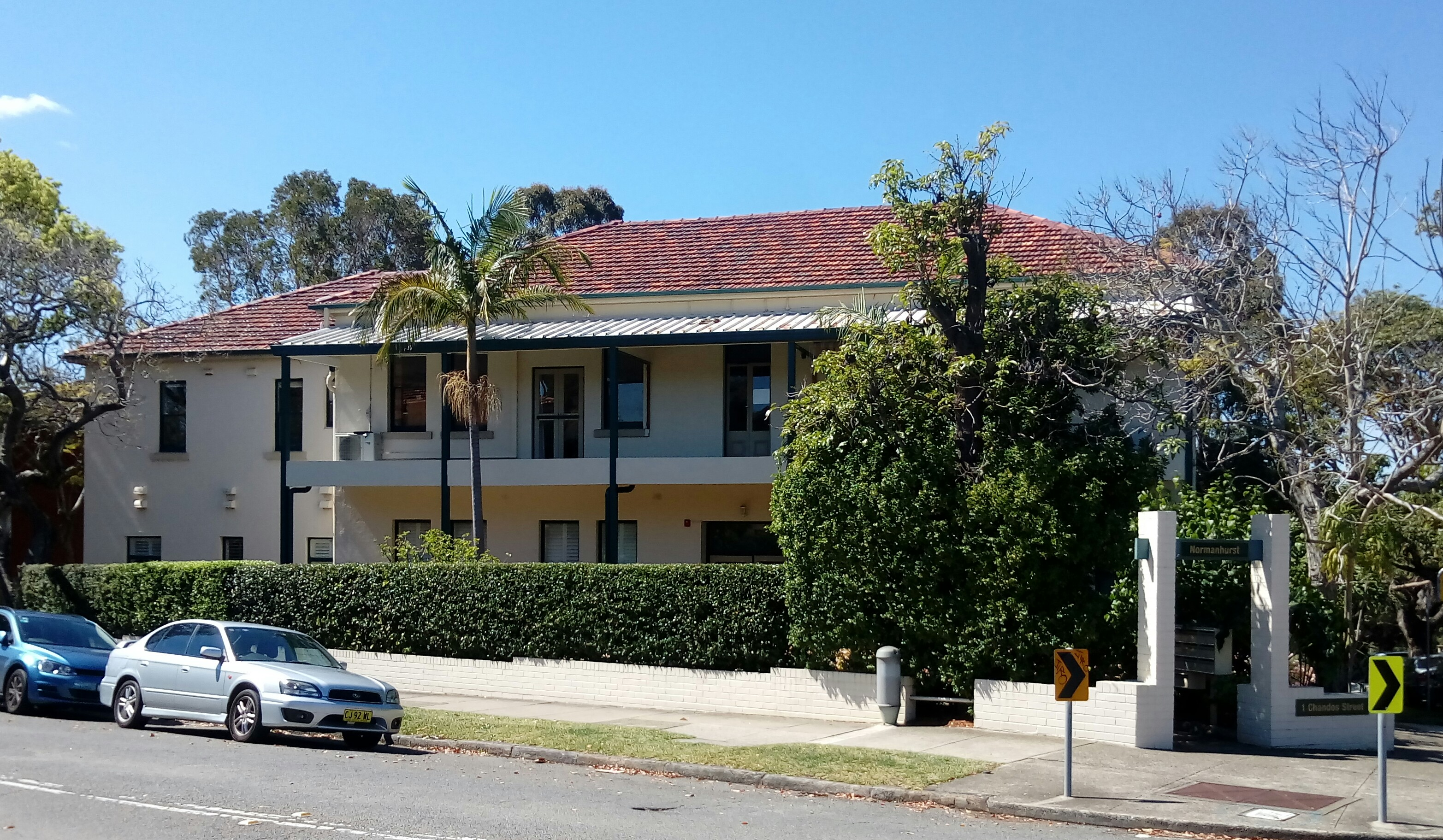
The former main building of the Normanhurst School in 2018.

The Normanhurst School was established in 1882 by Ellen Clarke, who was an English national. Clarke was principal of the school from its founding in 1882 to 1893. In 1884, her sister Marian Clarke arrived in Australia from England to join the faculty, and founded Abbotsleigh the following year.

At its foundation, the school operated out of a cottage located on Bland Street, Ashfield. Later as the school expanded, it moved to another larger campus in Ashfield at the intersection of Orpington and Chandos streets (pictured right).

Through the initiative of the then headmistress, Evelyn Tildesley, the Normanhurst School became a founding member of the Headmistresses’ Association of NSW (which has since become the Association of Heads of Independent Girls' Schools) in 1916.

The school ceased operations in 1941.

== Notable alumnae ==
- Daphne Akhurst (1903–1933) – five times Australian Open tennis champion
- Janet Cosh (1901–1989) – amateur botanist and plant collector
- Constance Elizabeth Harker (1875–1964) – was a headmistress at Somerville House.
- Margaret Slattery AM, DCSG (1922–2015) – National Secretary of the Australian Parents Council during the 1970s, an advocacy organisation for non-government schools
- P. L. Travers AO (1899–1996) – author of the Mary Poppins series of children's books, later adapted into the musical film of the same name
