= Frances Craig =

Australian headmistress (1888–1969)

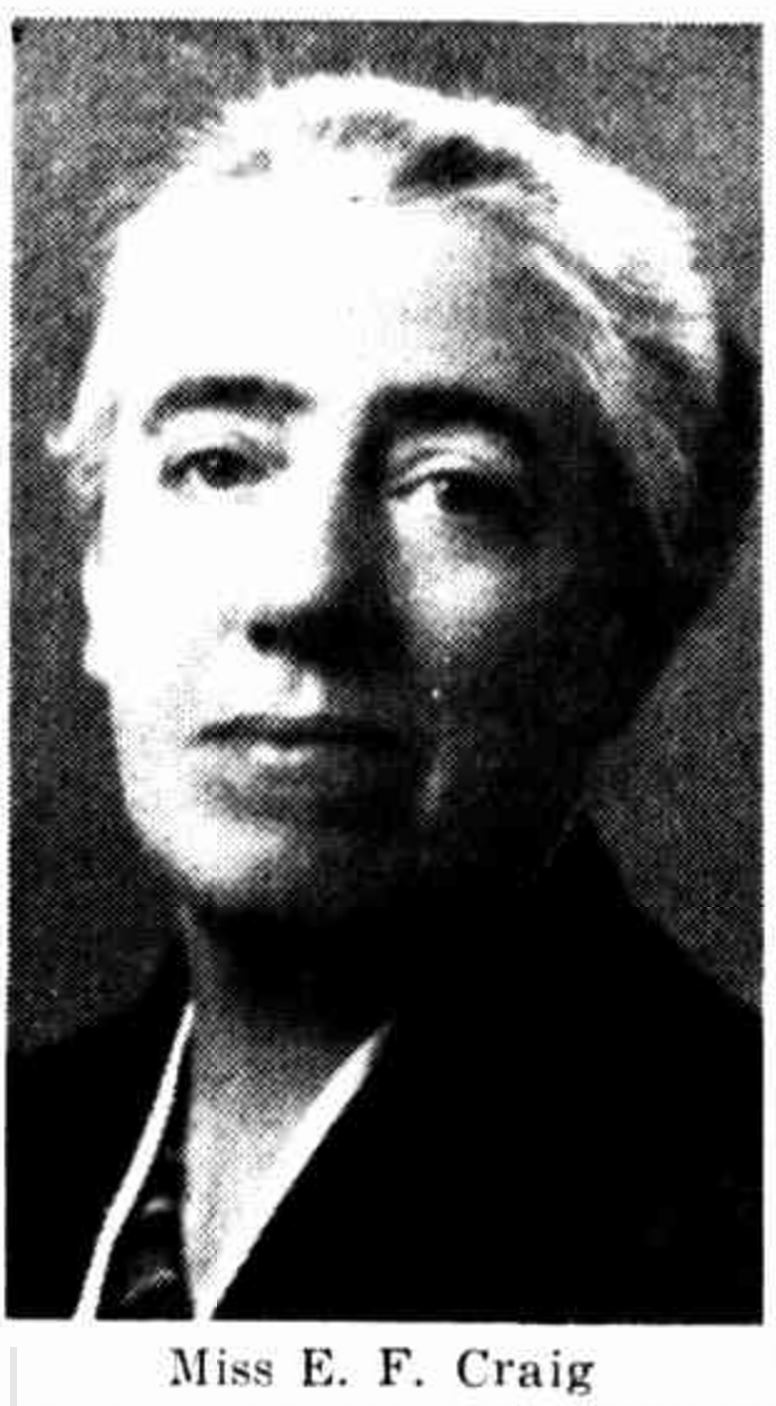
Frances Craig, 1940

Elinor Frances Craig (1888–1969) was a teacher in Brisbane, Queensland, Australia. She was the headmistress of Somerville House and continued to operate the school during World War II despite its premises being commandeered for military purposes and the threat of Japanese invasion.

== Early life ==
Known as Frances Craig, she was born in 1888 in Swansea, Tasmania. Her father, Rev. William Waters Craig, a Presbyterian clergyman, was sent to Singleton, New South Wales, where Frances completed her primary education.

== Teaching career ==
Frances Craig began teaching in 1912 at a school based in Newcastle, but later enrolled at the University of Sydney and studied there.

Craig transferred to the University of Queensland in 1917, so she could take a position as resident mistress at Brisbane High School for Girls (called Somerville House in 1920), where she finished her degree in 1919. After some time abroad where she undertook further study and experience, in 1932 Craig accepted the invitation at Somerville House to become vice-principal following the retirement of Constance Elizabeth Harker. She was appointed principal of Somerville House on 1 January 1941.

From January 1942 in World War II, the premises on which Somerville House was located was commandeered by the Australian Military Forces, and later used as a headquarters by a supply section of the United States Army. Day pupils were divided between Drysllwyn in Auchenflower and Queen Alexandra Home in Coorparoo, while the boarders were relocated to Mioiminda in Stanthorpe. Due to Craig's persistence and effort to keep together dispersed centres, students were able to return to the former school grounds in January 1945 where classes commenced on 6 February.

Craig retired on 30 April 1953.

== Later Life ==
Frances Craig died on 16 January 1969 in Mosman, Sydney.
