= Lottie Dalziel =

Australian sustainability expert (born 1993)

- Born: June 1993 (age 33); Brisbane, Queensland
- Education: Somerville House; Queensland University of Technology
- Occupation: Sustainability expert
- Years active: 2008-present
- Awards: NSW Young Australian of the Year 2023
- Website: https://banish.com.au/

Lottie Dalziel (born 1993) is an Australian sustainability expert, author and environmental advocate. She has promoted eco-friendly lifestyles and is the founder of online retailer and sustainable company Banish.

Dalziel is known for her contributions to the sustainable living movement in Australia through her company Banish and its recycling program BRAD. She was named NSW Young Australian of the Year in 2023. and Forbes 30 under 30 for Asia-Pacific Social Impact.

== Early life and education ==
Lottie Dalziel was born in 1993 in Brisbane.

== Career ==
In 2018, Dalziel founded Banish, an organisation with a mission to educate and provide sustainable alternatives to consumers. She began to raise awareness about sustainable living and provide accessible solutions to consumers, with education being the main focus.

Dalziel created a sustainable hub at Central Station in Sydney, Australia. It is home to interactive exhibits, a retail space, a recycling center and base of the nationwide the BRAD program

In February 2025 Dalziel published her first book 365+ Ways to Save the Planet and Your Money at the Same Time. The book outlines practical ways to live sustainably on a budget, which the Sydney Morning Herald called "an invaluable bible".

== Advocacy and achievement ==
Dalziel was named as one of Australia's Top 50 People in E-Commerce in 2023. She was 2021's Business NSW Sydney Metro Young Entrepreneur of the Year and Banish won overall Business of the Year

In 2023 Dalziel was named NSW Young Australian of the Year.

Dalziel planted a tree for the Coronation of Their Majesties King Charles III and Queen Camilla at Government House in 2023.

== Bibliography ==
- Dalziel, Lottie (2025). 365+ Ways to Save the Planet and Your Money at the Same Time. Australia: Murdoch Books. ISBN 978-1-76150-001-5 OCLC 1446795815
