= Cumbooquepa =

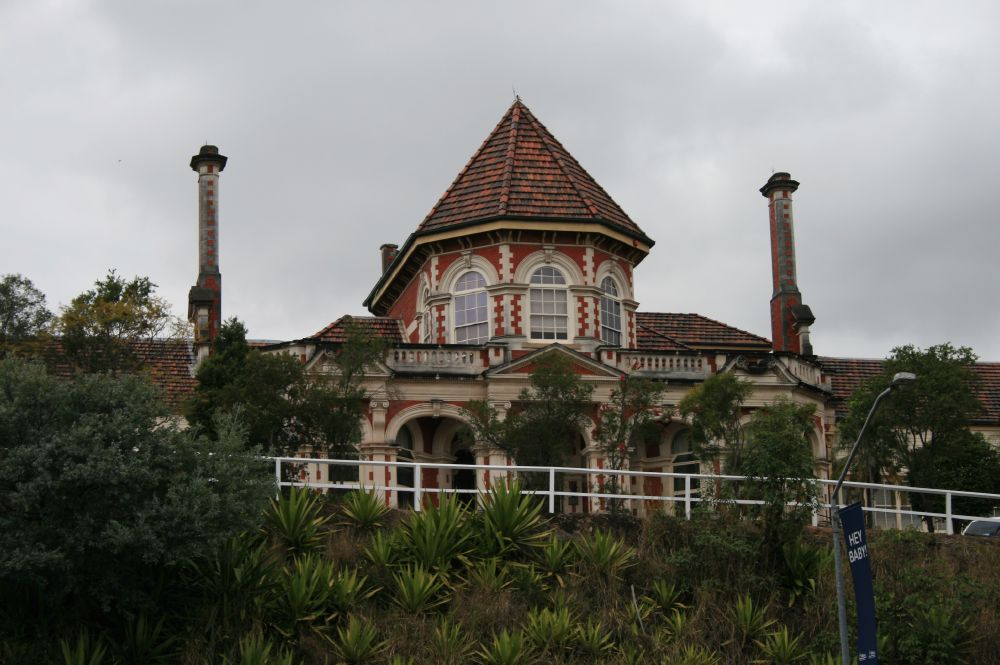
- Cumbooquepa, 2008

- Location within Queensland
- 27.4832°S 153.0244°E
- Location: 253 Vulture Street, South Brisbane, City of Brisbane, Queensland, Australia

History
- Design period: 1870s–1890s (late 19th century)
- Built: 1890

Site notes
- Architect: George Henry Male Addison

Queensland Heritage Register
- Official name: Somerville House, Brisbane High School for Girls, Cumbooquepa
- Type: state heritage (landscape, built)
- Designated: 21 October 1992
- Reference no.: 600305
- Significant period: 1890s–1910s (historical Stephens family); 1920s–1930s (historical school); 1942–1944 (historical WWI
- Significant components: classroom/classroom block/teaching area, residential accommodation – housing, garden/grounds, library – building

Cumbooquepa is a heritage-listed house at Somerville House, 253 Vulture Street, South Brisbane, City of Brisbane, Queensland, Australia. It was designed by George Henry Male Addison and built in 1890. It is also known as Brisbane High School for Girls. It was added to the Queensland Heritage Register on 21 October 1992.

== History ==
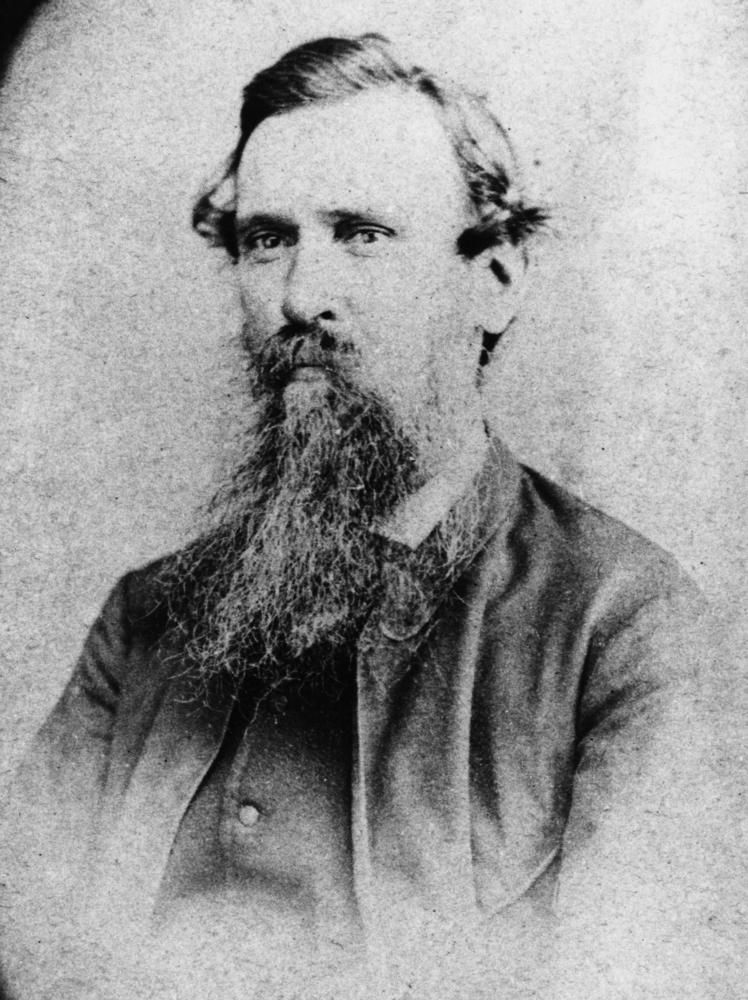
Thomas Blacket Stephens, 1867

Cumbooquepa is a large single-storeyed house built in 1890 on a ridge overlooking the South Brisbane Reach of the Brisbane River.

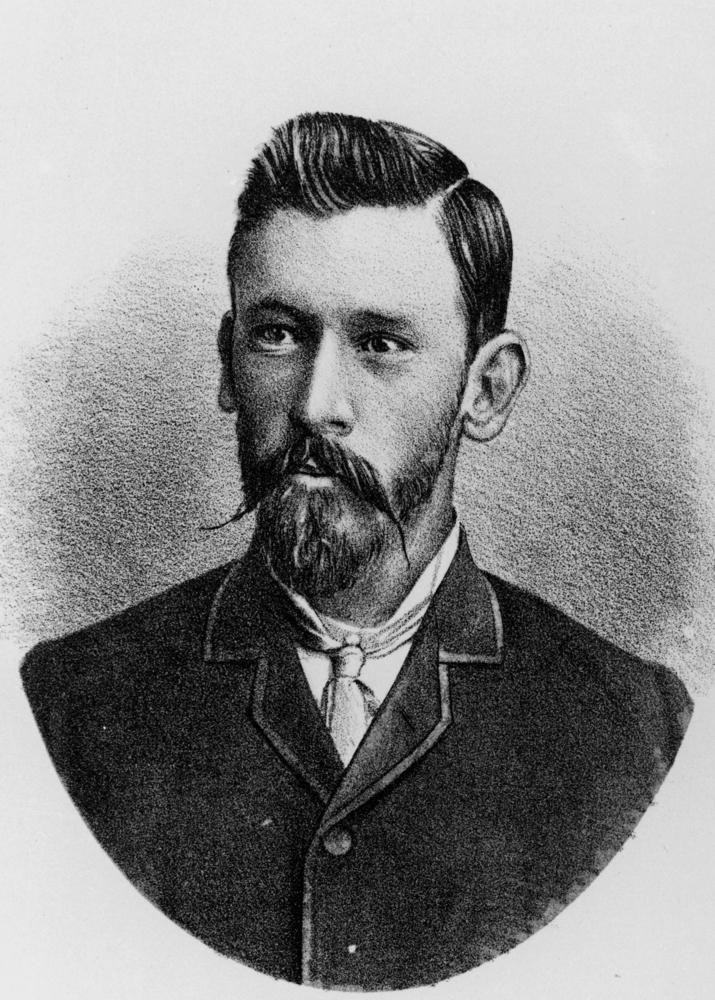
William Stephens, circa 1889

The land was acquired in 1856 by Thomas Blacket Stephens, a politician, newspaper proprietor and businessman, who became Brisbane's second mayor. Stevens built a timber dwelling called Cumbooquepa on the property. He died in 1877 and management of his estate passed to his eldest son, William Stephens, a politician, businessman and first mayor of South Brisbane.

In 1890 the Stephens family moved into a new house designed by GHM Addison where they lived until the early 1900s. This second Cumbooquepa was built on a higher part of the site, a short distance from the original which was demolished in 1890 to make way for the south coast and southern suburbs railway line.

The house remained in the family until 1919 when the property was acquired by the Presbyterian and Methodist Schools Association as the new premises for the Brisbane High School for Girls. In 1920 Somerville House was added to the title of the school honouring Mary Somerville, a Scottish scientist whose name was also associated with Somerville College at the University of Oxford. Constance Elizabeth Harker and Marjorie Kate Jarrett, important for their contributions to female education in Queensland, were the co-principals of the school from 1909 until the retirement of Miss Harker in 1931.

An L-shaped two-storeyed educational block was built in 1920 to a design by architects Chambers and Powell with an extension containing a gymnasium and chemistry and biology laboratories completed in 1926.

A two-roomed library building designed by Thomas Brenan Femister Gargett as a memorial to CE Harker was opened in 1935 and extended to include an art studio in 1939–40. The former library includes memorial stained glass windows by William Bustard. It was probably the first purpose-designed library building at a girls' school in Queensland. Recently altered, the building is now used as a chapel.

Early in 1942 Somerville House became General Headquarters, United Army Forces Far East, United States Army Services of Supply and Base Section 3. TBF Gargett, architect to the US Army, was responsible for adapting the school buildings for the army. During this period the school relocated, reopening at South Brisbane in January 1945.

Since the Second World War various classrooms, a five-storeyed science wing and sporting facilities have been erected. The Constance Harker Hall was built during the 1970s. It houses an 1888 pipe organ by Alfred Hunter & Sons of London.

== Description ==
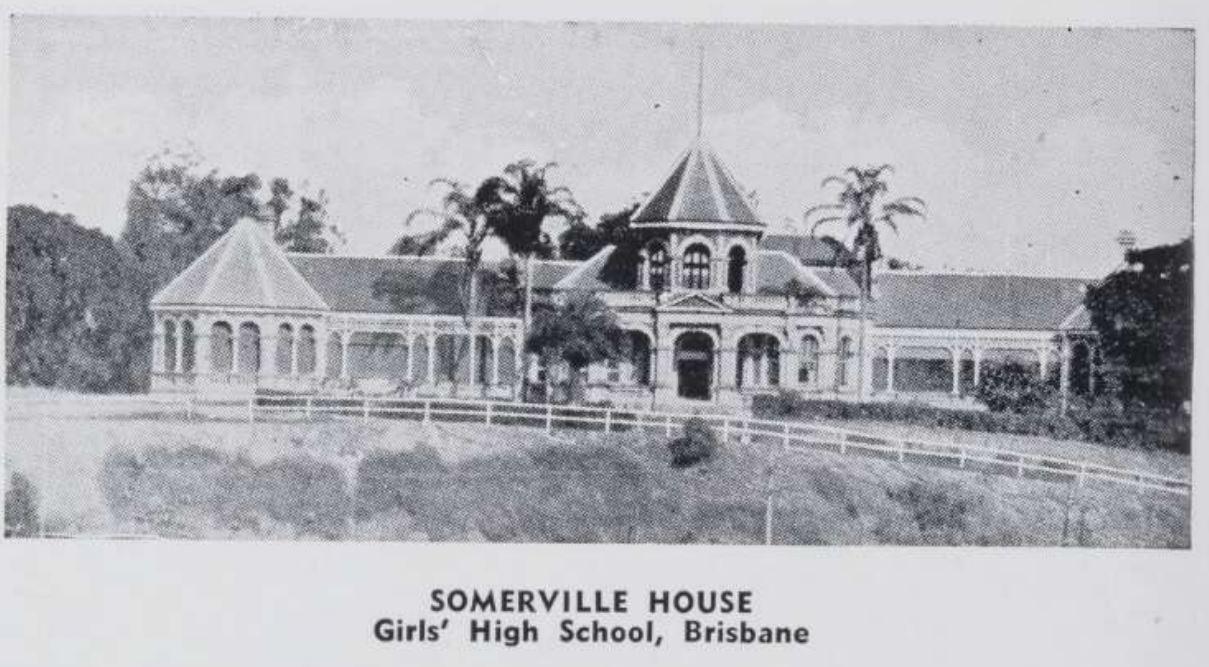
Cumbooquepa, circa 1947

Somerville House comprises structures and landscaping elements, including paths, walls and cuttings on the large triangular block bounded on the north side by Vulture Street and on the west by the railway line. The buildings situated on the main Vulture Street frontage are Cumbooquepa in the north eastern part of the site and, in the northwest corner, the former library/studio building.

Cumbooquepa, a single-storeyed masonry and timber house with terracotta tiled and corrugated iron hip roofs, is located on the highest part of the site overlooking the Brisbane River to the north. It is deliberately sited to present a grand hilltop facade addressing the city. Much of the ornament is lavished on this northern facade, the other sides of the building being relatively modest in materials and detail. The house is constructed of red brick on a patterned brick and stone base with timber verandahs to the side and rear elevations. Originally E-shaped in plan, the long northern facade connects central, eastern and western wings arranged around two verandahed courtyards. The central wing contains the entrance hall, reception rooms, dining room and kitchen while the eastern and western wings are used to provide accommodation for boarders and staff.

The north elevation is a symmetrical composition consisting of bow-fronted pavilions on the eastern and western corners connected by colonnades to a central entry pavilion surmounted by a tower. This front facade is embellished with arches, pediments, quoins, cornices, parapets, balustrades and pilasters with Ionic capitals that are rendered to contrast with the brickwork.

The central entrance pavilion includes two bow-fronted rooms, a meeting room to the east and study to the west, and a central entrance hall and porch. These rooms have rendered masonry walls, plaster ceilings and feature high-quality timber joinery. The entrance hall, has a marbled tiled floor and is timber panelled to dado height. Stained glass in two fanlights and tall arched niches in its four corners depict Shakespearian characters: Touchstone (As You Like It), Jaques (As You Like It), Portia (The Merchant of Venice), Beatrice (Much Ado About Nothing), Viola (Twelfth Night) and Rosalind (As You Like It). The niche in the southwest corner of the hall opens onto a timber staircase which leads to the tower room. In the study are elaborate built-in timber bookshelves and cabinets and a fireplace with an ornate timber surround.

The dining room, accessed from a breezeway at the rear of the entrance hall, has rendered walls with timber wainscoting and an ornate coved and panelled ceiling that is lined with diagonal tongue and groove boards. The room, which overlooks both courtyards, is embellished with stained glass windows in arched openings, elaborate timber lintels over the entry doors, built-in timber furniture, two fireplaces and bay windows in arched recesses.

Circulation throughout the building is via the extensive verandahs and colonnades, all of which are now enclosed. The southern ends of the courtyards, once open, are now blocked off by two brick bathroom wings with storage areas underneath. The house has six brick chimney stacks, some of which are highly ornate.

While the former house is elevated high above the street, the former library/studio building, now the chapel, steps down the site. Built on a finger of land between the entry driveway, Vulture Street and the railway line, the building which is integrated with the adjacent pathway, steps and walls, forms an entry onto the site. The former library is a one-storeyed buttressed brick structure with contrasting rendered details including castellated parapets, window frames, arches and base and has steeply pitched terracotta tiled roofs. It was designed in the English Perpendicular "gothic revival" style.

The octagonal north end has four stained glass memorial windows which are the work of Brisbane artist William Bustard. The interiors have been altered and a new entry constructed at the southern end.

These buildings of Somerville House are all red brick with cement render details and form a cohesive and intact group prominently located above the historic precinct surrounding South Brisbane Memorial Park and adjoining the former South Brisbane Town Hall.

== Heritage listing ==
Cumbooquepa was listed on the Queensland Heritage Register on 21 October 1992 having satisfied the following criteria.

The place is important in demonstrating the evolution or pattern of Queensland's history.

Cumbooquepa is important in demonstrating the evolution of Queensland's history as evidence of education for girls in Queensland.

The place demonstrates rare, uncommon or endangered aspects of Queensland's cultural heritage.

Cumbooquepa is an uncommon example of a large late 19th century residence, which is exceptional for its architectural quality, lavish interiors, and prominence as a landmark.

The place is important because of its aesthetic significance.

The school buildings are important in exhibiting a range of aesthetic qualities valued by the community, in particular the architectural distinction of the former library/studio building, the high quality of the stained glass and timber joinery in Cumbooquepa and the former library/studio building, the cohesive and picturesque grouping of landscape elements and buildings, the contribution of the wall and garden to the streetscape and the contribution to the townscape as a landmark.

The place has a strong or special association with a particular community or cultural group for social, cultural or spiritual reasons.

Cumbooquepa has a special association with the Brisbane High School for Girls.

The place has a special association with the life or work of a particular person, group or organisation of importance in Queensland's history.

Cumbooquepa has a special association with the Stephens Family, CE Harker, MK Jarrett and the US Army and Brisbane architects, GHM Addison, and TBF Gargett and artisan William Bustard, and are important examples of their work.
