= Janet Cosh =

Amateur botantist, botanical collector and teacher (1901–1989)

Janet Louise Cosh (21 April 1901 – 22 October 1989) was an amateur botanist, botanical collector and secondary school teacher. The Janet Cosh Herbarium at the University of Wollongong is named in her honour.

== Life ==
Janet Louise Cosh born in Ashfield, New South Wales on 21 April 1901. She was the daughter of Louise (née Calvert) and Dr John Cosh. An only child, she was educated at Normanhurst School for Girls (1914–1918) before studying English, history and classics at the University of Sydney. After graduation, she returned to Normanhurst School to teach.

Although not trained as a botanist, Cosh collected 1,600 specimens and made nearly 2,000 botanical illustrations of plants she found in the Southern Highlands and Illawarra regions of New South Wales.

== Legacy ==
The Janet Cosh Herbarium at the University of Wollongong was established by a bequest in her will. It houses her specimens, illustrations and other materials including field notebooks, photographs and maps. The position of curator of her eponymous herbarium was funded by her bequest until it was exhausted in 2020, but the herbarium itself is supported by the university.

Another bequest enabled the creation of the Janet Cosh Memorial Room at the visitors centre at Fitzroy Falls through the Foundation for National Parks and Wildlife. The room holds specimens of local flora and copies of some of Cosh's botanical illustrations.
