= Constance Elizabeth Harker =

Australian headmistress (1875–1964)

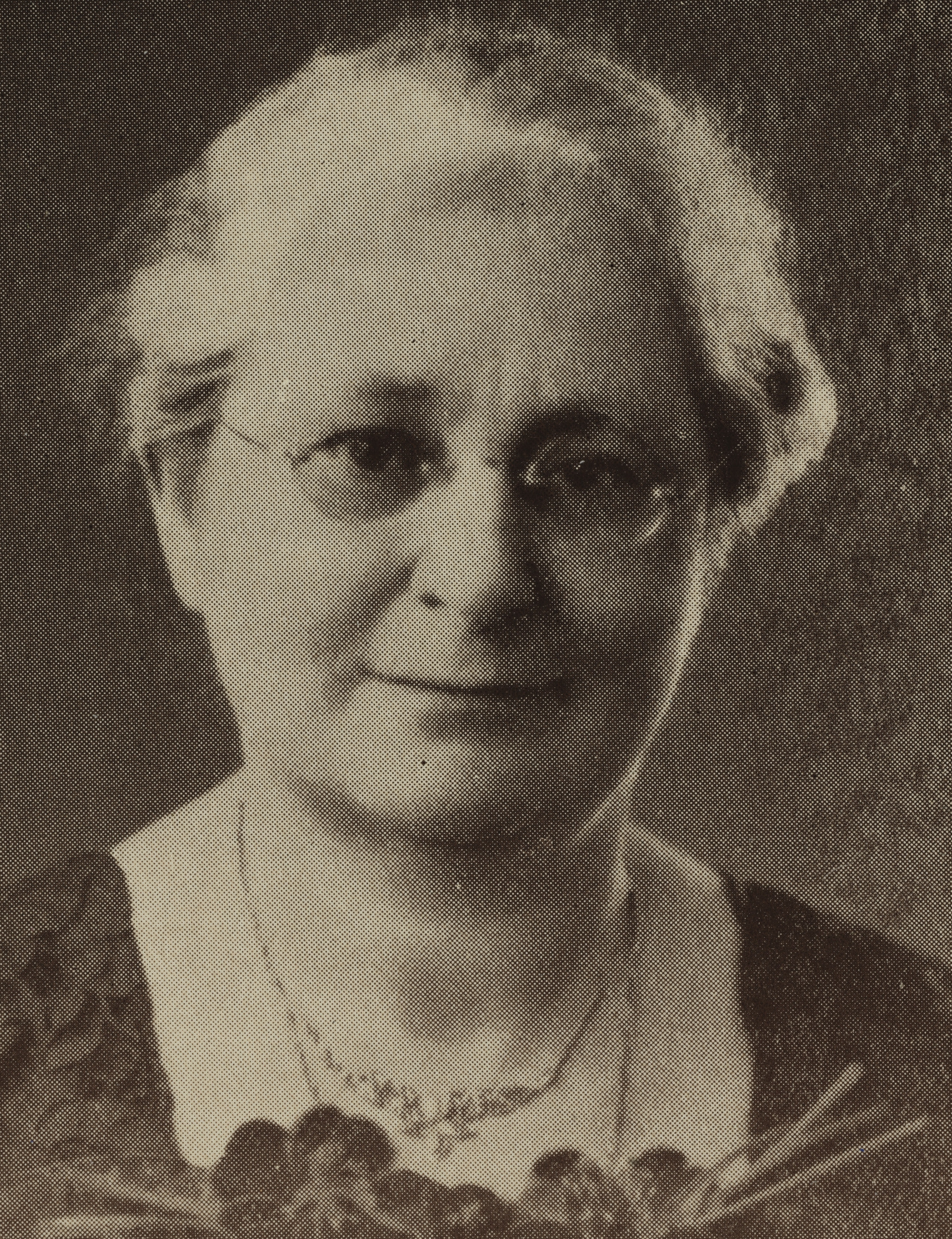
- Born: 1 April 1875; Fitzroy
- Died: 16 December 1964 (aged 89); Toowoomba
- Occupation: School principal
- Partner: Marjorie Kate Jarrett

Constance Elizabeth Harker (1 April 1875 – 16 December 1964) was an Australian headmistress who with Marjorie Jarrett ran the Brisbane High School for Girls. Under their leadership it became part of the Presbyterian and Methodist Schools Association and gained its popular name of Somerville House.

== Life ==
Harker was born in 1875 in the suburb of Fitzroy. Her Australian born parents were Priscilla Matilda (born Boase) and her husband John Harker - who was a manufacturer. She attended Normanhurst School, Ashfield after her family moved to Sydney. At the age of sixteen she became one of the four founding pupils of the University of Sydney's Women's College. She studied history and English and graduated from the University of Sydney, in 1895, with a first class honours degree.

It was at Presbyterian Ladies' College, Croydon that she met her future partner Marjorie Kate Jarrett where they were both teaching. In 1905 she left for Europe where she studied languages and educational methods in Germany, Britain and France. She returned in 1908 and began work at the Brisbane High School for Girls as the acting headmistress. The school had been founded by Welsh-born Eliza Ann Fewings in 1899 and it soon became the largest girls' school in Queensland. Fewings had been made the warden at the Alexandra Hall in Wales and she wanted to sell her school. A sale was agreed and Harker and Marjorie Jarrett became the co-principals in 1909. The school in Wickham Terrace succeeded but not financially so Jarett and Harker agreed to sell the school to the Presbyterian and Methodist Schools Association who then employed them as principals.

In 1920 the school moved into Cumbooquepa the former home of the politician and newspaperman Thomas Blacket Stephens in Vulture Street, South Brisbane. The school still with had the same official name but was re-branded as Somerville House with an initial rollcall of 225 girls. Somerville was the name of the leading Scottish scientist Mary Somerville.

She continued to live at the school with Marjorie Jarrett after she retired in 1931. In 1934 the new school library was started and Harker laid the foundation stone. Marjorie Jarrett retired in 1940 and died in 1944.

Harker died in 1964 in Toowoomba. Harker was credited with founding the Queensland Girls' Secondary Schools Sports Association.
