= Ida Nancy Ashburn =

Australian head-mistress and nurse (1909–1980)

Ida Ashburn
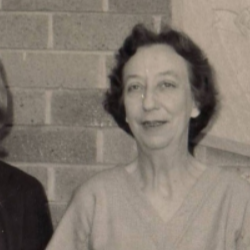
- Ashburn at her retirement announcement in 1964.
- Born: Ida Nancy Ashburn; 3 August 1909; Esk, Queensland, Australia
- Died: 20 October 1980 (aged 71); Clayfield, Queensland, Australia
- Other name: "Ashie"
- Education: University of Queensland
- Occupations: Head-mistress; Nurse

Ida Nancy Ashburn (3 August 1909 – 20 October 1980) was an Australian headmistress and nurse. After graduating from the University of Queensland, she became founding principal of Clayfield College from 1934 to 1964. During the Second World War, she trained as a nurse to the Voluntary Aid Detachment and from 1959 served on the Soldiers' Children Education Board for 20 years.

== Early life ==
Ashburn was born on 3 August, 1909 at Esk, Queensland to married couple John Mark Ashburn and Ida Victoria, née Thorn, as the fourth of five children. Her father was a grazier on the property "Rocklea" near Barcaldine, before moving to Brisbane. In her early years she was educated in a private school in Clayfield before she was moved to Brisbane State High School for girls (which was attached to Somerville House) from between 1923 and 1927, where the Australian Dictionary of Biography observes "she was noted by the co-principals Constance Harker and Marjorie Jarrett 'for future use'." Ashburn was the recipient of a State scholarship in 1923, which was extended for two years in 1926.

== Career ==
After being granted her extended scholarship in 1926 to the Teachers' Training College in Brisbane, Ashburn qualified for University matriculation — she came third class in English, French, Greek, mathematics A and ancient history and second class in biology. Ashburn graduated from the University of Queensland in 1929 with a double-major in English, and Language and Psychology. She taught at her first school, Albert State School in Maryborough, as an assistant-teacher before transferring to Monto State School in May 1930. When Clayfield College moved to Bayview Terrace in Clayfield she resigned from Monto State School and commenced a position as mistress-in-charge of the college's primary school. The Australian Dictionary of Biography describes her as "an energetic and dynamic teacher" who also "undertook all secretarial and administrative tasks in her early days at Clayfield College". She was made head-mistress of the school in 1934, and in 1938 she formed one of the first instances of a parent's committee in a Brisbane school. Whilst in this position she studied the Classics part-time at the University of Queensland and received her B.A. in 1936.

She was a regular member of St Mark's Anglican Church in Clayton.

After her only brother Colin died in World War II she trained as a nurse with the State Voluntary Aid Detachment and later served on the State branch of the Repatriation Department's Soldiers' Children Education Board. She remained on the board from 1959 before retiring in 1979.

== Retirement and death ==
Ashburn retired from Clayfield College in 1964. The Australian Dictionary of Biography notes that the school could never have been considered large, but that this allowed her to know each student personally — to the point where students nick-named her "Ashie". Ashburn died on 20 October 1980 in Clayfield and was cremated. The college library was named after her, and later the college developed the Nancy Ashburn Learning Centre in her honour.
