= Tania Major =

Australian activist (born 1981)

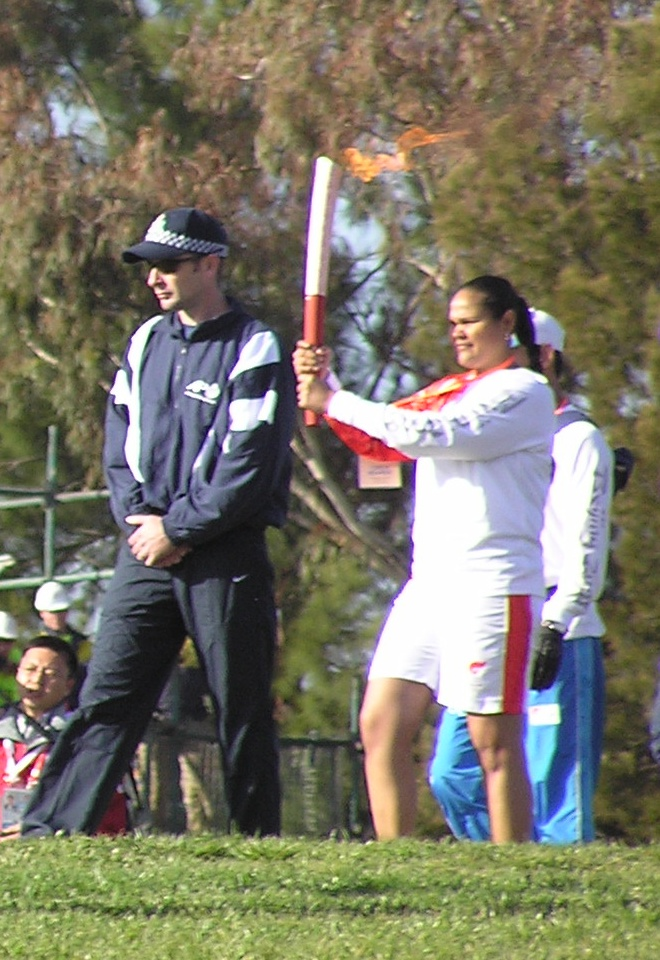
- Tania Major, the first torch bearer at the 2008 Olympic torch relay in Canberra
- Born: 13 June 1981 (age 45); Cairns, Queensland, Australia
- Education: Clayfield College
- Alma mater: Griffith University
- Occupation: Aboriginal activist

Tania Major (born 13 June 1981) is an Australian Aboriginal activist who first came to prominence in 2004 as the youngest person elected to the Aboriginal and Torres Strait Islander Commission (ATSIC).

== Biography ==
Born in Cairns, Queensland, to Peter Taylor and Priscilla Major, Major was educated at Clayfield College and Griffith University in Brisbane, where she graduated with a Bachelor of Arts in criminology and criminal justice.

The Cairns-based indigenous youth advocate used her profile to draw attention to domestic violence in the Aboriginal community. Her forthright way of addressing the problems focused national attention on the issue. She spoke to opinion makers, the public and government about sexual violence and rape in the Aboriginal community, asking Prime Minister John Howard to help lift the "blanket of shame" that was preventing such assaults being reported. "I'm proud to be an Aboriginal Australian and to have been recognised and acknowledged for the work I'm involved in," Major said.

In 2007, Major was named as the Young Australian of the Year, having been earlier named as the Queensland Young Australian of the Year. She is currently the Youth Development Project Officer for the Cape York Institute for Policy and Leadership, and a Regional Councillor for the Aboriginal and Torres Strait Islander Commission (ATSIC).

Awards
Preceded by Trisha Broadbridge	Young Australian of the Year; 2007	Succeeded by Casey Stoner
