= William Whale =

British Baptist minister

William Whale (c. 20 September 1842 – 5 September 1903) was a British Baptist minister who had a career in Brisbane, Australia.

== History ==
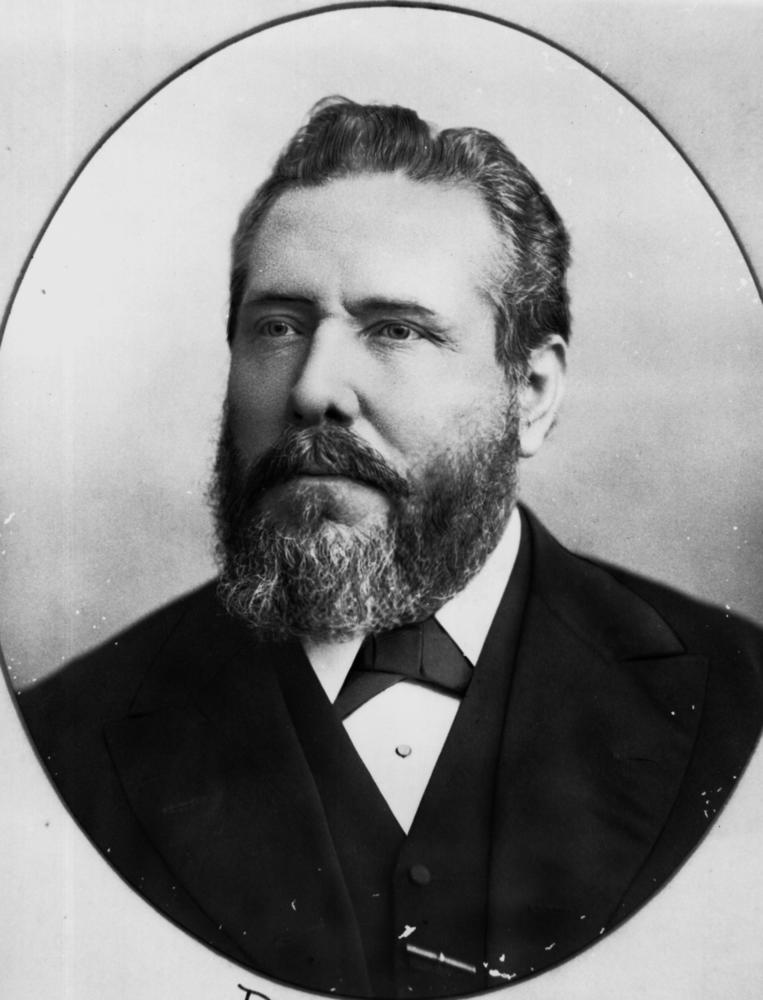
Rev. William Whale

Whale studied for the ministry at the Pastors' College, and after a few minor postings he was sent to Middlesbrough, Yorkshire, where he gained a reputation as a great public speaker.

On 5 October 1885 he arrived in Brisbane and began work at the Wharf Street Baptist Church, which soon proved adequate for the number of worshippers, so land was purchased on Wickham Terrace, where they erected the building known as the City Tabernacle. He became a great friend of the (Anglican) bishop W. T. T. Webber; they worked together on various social projects, each holding the other with the highest regard.

He had a reputation for generosity – assisting other Baptist ministers who did not have his advantages, and providing sources of information to his parishioners from his own well-stocked library.

He suffered considerably from a painful condition in the months and years before his death.

== Family ==
Whale married Sarah Latchford (4 March 1842 – 22 August 1933) in 1863. They had one son, W. H. Whale, who was employed by the Post and Telegraph Department. They had four daughters:

- Harriet Kate Whale (1868 – 24 March 1893) married Jeremiah Garnett Horsfall on 10 September 1891, lived in Brisbane.
- Mary Elizabeth Whale married (John) Herbert Goldsmith on 25 June 1895. He was a chemist, from Rockhampton. She was president of the Queensland Women's Electoral League.
- Jessie Josephine Whale married Leonard C. Morris on 3 January 1906. He was Director of Technical Education, had a home at Wingara Street, Yeerongpilly.
- Elsie Louise Whale married Frederick William Simpson on 18 February 1903, living at Orange, New South Wales.

No link has been found to Albert Toomer Whale (1890–1964), also a Baptist minister.
