= Somerville House =

Location
- 17 Graham Street; South Brisbane, Queensland, 4101; Australia; 27°29′2″S 153°1′26″E

Information
- Type: Independent, day and boarding
- Motto: Honour Before Honours
- Denomination: Presbyterian and Uniting Church
- Established: 1899
- Founder: Eliza Fewings
- Principal: Deborah Priest
- Staff: ~80
- Grades: Pre–prep to Year 12
- Gender: Girls
- Enrolment: ~1,400
- Colours: Green, blue, and white
- Website: somerville.qld.edu.au

Somerville House is an independent, boarding and day school for girls, located in South Brisbane, an inner-city suburb of Brisbane, Queensland, Australia.

Established in 1899 as the Brisbane High School for Girls, the School was eventually named after the Scottish scientific writer, Mary Somerville (1780–1872), though the school's official name is still Brisbane High School for Girls. Today, Somerville House is owned by the Presbyterian and Methodist Schools Association (PMSA), and provides classes from Preparatory to Year 12, within two sub-schools — Junior School (Years Prep to 6) and Senior School (Years 7 to 12). Within the Senior School it is also split into Middle Years (Years 7–9) and Senior Years (Years 10–12). The school currently caters for approximately 1,385 students from Prep to Year 12, including approximately 100 boarders currently ranging from Years 5 to 12.

Somerville House is affiliated with the Association of Heads of Independent Schools of Australia (AHISA), the Junior School Heads Association of Australia (JSHAA), the Alliance of Girls' Schools Australasia (AGSA), the Australian Boarding Schools Association (ABSA), and is a founding member of the Queensland Girls' Secondary Schools Sports Association Inc (QGSSSA).

The former boarding house, Cumbooquepa, meaning waterholes that existed below the house, is listed on the Queensland Heritage Register.

== History ==
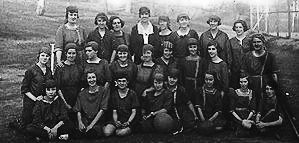
Athletics team, c.1900

The Brisbane High School for Girls (later to be known as Somerville House) was established with 39 students in the basement of the Baptist City Tabernacle at 183 Wickham Terrace, by Eliza Fewings in October 1899. The early school consisted of a large Assembly hall, drill hall, and a number of separate classrooms, with the four founding boarders living with Fewings at her home, "Glen Olive", in Toowong. Fewings, who had previously been Headmistress of the Brisbane Girls Grammar School, but after being dismissed, decided to open her own school, she aimed to create a school community where girls could be educated and equipped with social graces, and would be able to take a leading role in the management of the nation. Based on English models, within three years it became the largest girls' secondary school in Queensland, with 150 students.

In 1900, the boarders moved to "Whytecliffe" at Albion, a property which still stands in Whytecliffe Street. In July 1903, the boarders were moved again, this time to "Garth House" on Wickham Terrace, which was closer to the Day School. Early in 1906, after Fewings returned from a trip abroad, the boarding students were relocated once more to "Cheltenham", which was situated in what is now Jephson Street, Toowong.

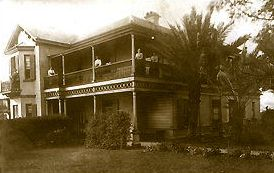
"Garth House", the boarding school, c.1903

Constance Elizabeth Harker had been an acting headteacher and she and Marjorie Jarrett purchased the school in 1909, and so began their partnership as co-principals. The two women had met while teaching at the Presbyterian Ladies' College, Sydney, where Harker was senior English and classics mistress. Following their purchase of the school, they searched for a site in Brisbane that could house the day and boarding schools under one roof, and in 1912, settled on "Erneton" on Wickham Terrace, which was located next door to the boarders previous residence, "Garth House". A paddock at the rear of Garth House was rented for a netball court. As time went on, space became limited at the new site, and so Athol Place, a few doors away on the Terrace was rented for extra boarders and two primary classes.

Harker and Jarrett gained little income from the school, as teacher-proprietors had little chance of financing a modern expanding school, especially one with boarding facilities. In 1918, due to these financial struggles, they transferred ownership to the newly formed Presbyterian and Methodist Schools Association, while retaining their Principalship. In 1920 the school moved from Wickham Terrace to its present site on Mater Hill, in South Brisbane, opening with an enrolment of 225 pupils. The boarding-school occupied "Cumbooquepa",the now heritage-listed former home of prominent Brisbane businessman, newspaper publisher, and one time Mayor of Brisbane, Thomas Blacket Stephens and his son William Stephens mayor of the South Brisbane City Council (built 1890). A new classroom block was constructed in 1919, designed by architect Lange Powell. At this time the school's name was changed to Somerville House, in recognition of the work of Mary Somerville (1780–1872), a famous Scottish scientist and mathematician of the 19th century. Over the next two decades the school carried out a major building programme and established a good reputation.

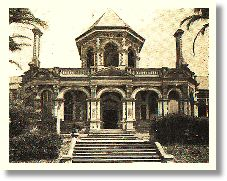
Cumbooquepa, c.1920

Harker retired in 1931, but continued to live at the boarding school until Jarrett's retirement in 1940. During her time as Principal, she gained a reputation in Queensland as a pioneer in the education of girls. The academic achievements of Somerville House during her co-Principalship were amongst the best in the state, and she widened the interests of her pupils by encouraging visitors who were authorities on literature, music, art and international affairs. She encouraged good citizenship and social service, and during World War I formed the first school branch of the Red Cross Society in Queensland. The school subsequently had branches of the Australian Student Christian Movement and the League of Nations Union, two companies of Girl Guides, and a Cot Fund which supported the ill and disabled. The still functioning Queensland Girls' Secondary Schools Sports Association (QGSSSA), was initiated by her.

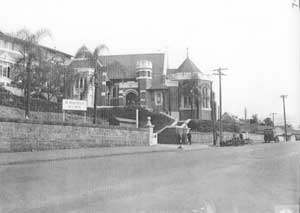
WWII Communication Centre at Somerville, c.1943

On Saturday 24 January 1942, Military authorities visited Somerville House with a view to taking it over. The school was officially commandeered by the Australian Military Forces on 1 February, and was later used as Base Section Three Headquarters of the United States Army, East Asian Command, for the duration of the Second World War. Pupils from north of the Brisbane River were transferred to Raymont Lodge, at Auchenflower, while those from the south went to the former Queen Alexandra Home, Coorparoo; boarding students were sent to Moiomindah at Stanthorpe, which became the school's administrative centre. Based at Stanthorpe, the Principal at the time, Elinor Frances Craig, managed the three dispersed centres and frequently commuted by rail to maintain a presence in Brisbane. The school returned to South Brisbane with minimal inconvenience in January 1945, and classes commenced on 6 February. The American forces still occupied the upper floor of the school's education block with an armed guard at the door.

The years since the war have seen many changes to Cumbooquepa, which was used as a boarding house until 2017 when the new Bauer building was constructed and now houses the boarders. Restoration work was undertaken in 1980 in order to preserve the building. The first new building since the library in 1934 was opened in 1960, the MK Jarrett School of Music and Drama. This has been followed with further construction, including the Aquatic Centre, Seymour Centre, classrooms, and the Valmai Pidgeon Performing Arts Complex, opened in 2000. In 1986, Old Girls of the School rallied from around the country in protest of an offer to the School Council from an overseas syndicate, to purchase the School for use as a trade centre, adjoining the Expo '88 site. This offer was eventually rejected.

On 15 June 1999, the school purchased the adjacent heritage-listed Old South Brisbane Town Hall. The school uses the buildings for offices and function rooms.

== Principals ==
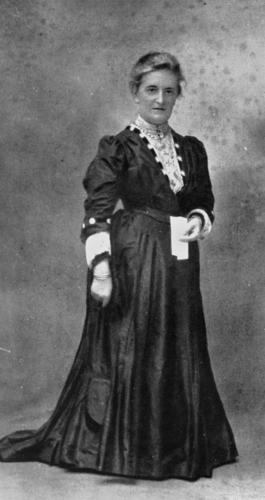
Eliza Ann Fewings, Founder and first principal of the Brisbane High School for Girls, c.1899

Period	Details
1899–1909	Eliza Ann Fewings
1910–1931	Constance Elizabeth Harker
1910–1940	Marjorie Kate Jarrett
1941–1953	Elinor Frances Craig
1953–1956	Ellen Christensen
1957–1969	Isobel Taylor
1970–1973	Rod Wells
1974–1987	Sam Seymour
1988–2003	Murray J Evans
2004–2010, 2017–2018	Ness Goodwin
2011–2017	Flo Kearney
2019–2023	Kim Kiepe
2024–2026	Sandra Hastie
2026	Deborah Priest
2027–	Samantha Jensen

== Curriculum ==
Somerville House typically performs well in statewide examinations, scoring the second highest rating for academic outcomes from girls' schools, directly after Brisbane Girls Grammar School in the Queensland Studies Authority's 2005 report.

== Gallery ==
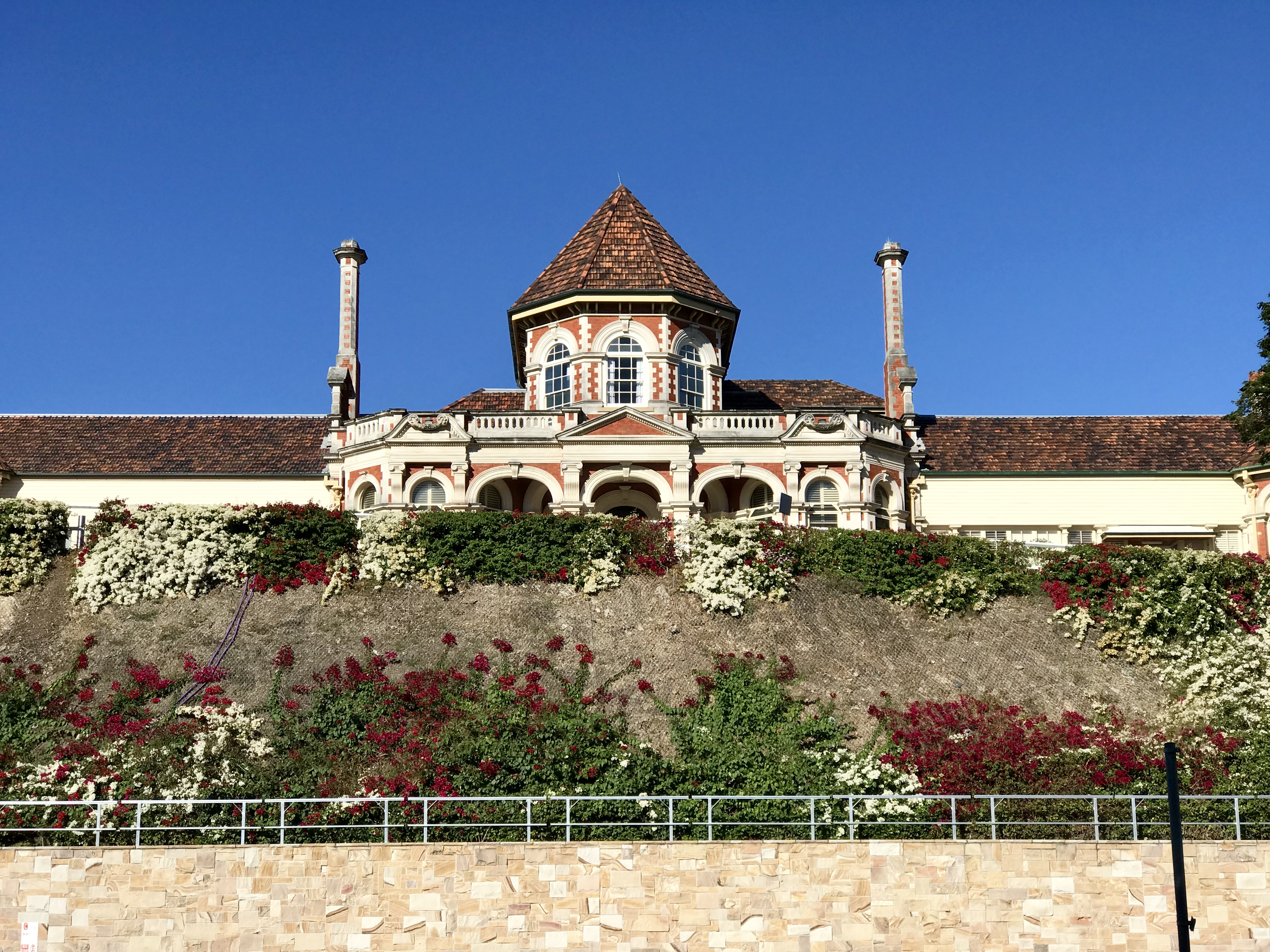
Cumbooquepa building, c. 1880

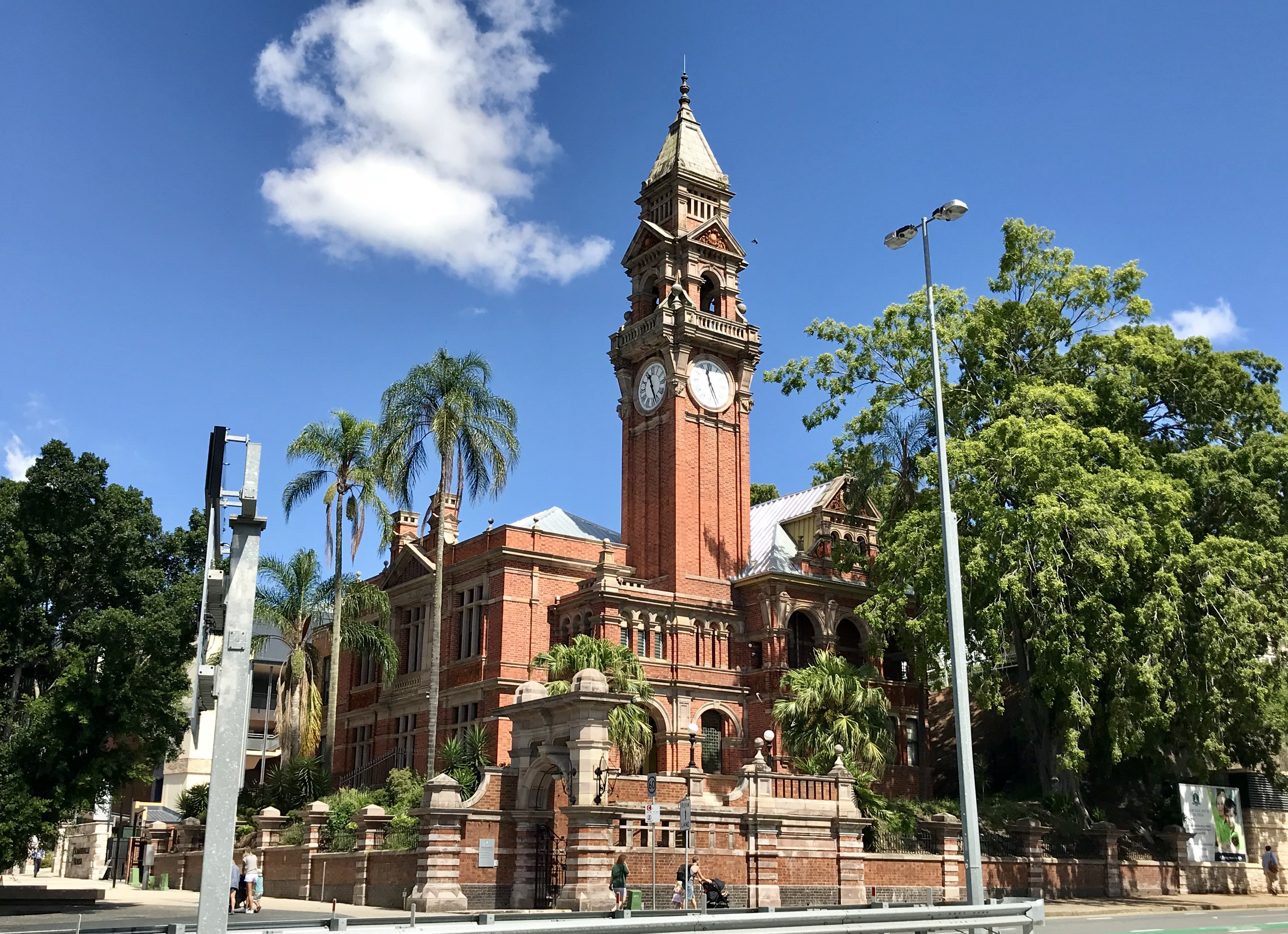
"The Chambers" building (formerly South Brisbane Town Hall), c. 1892

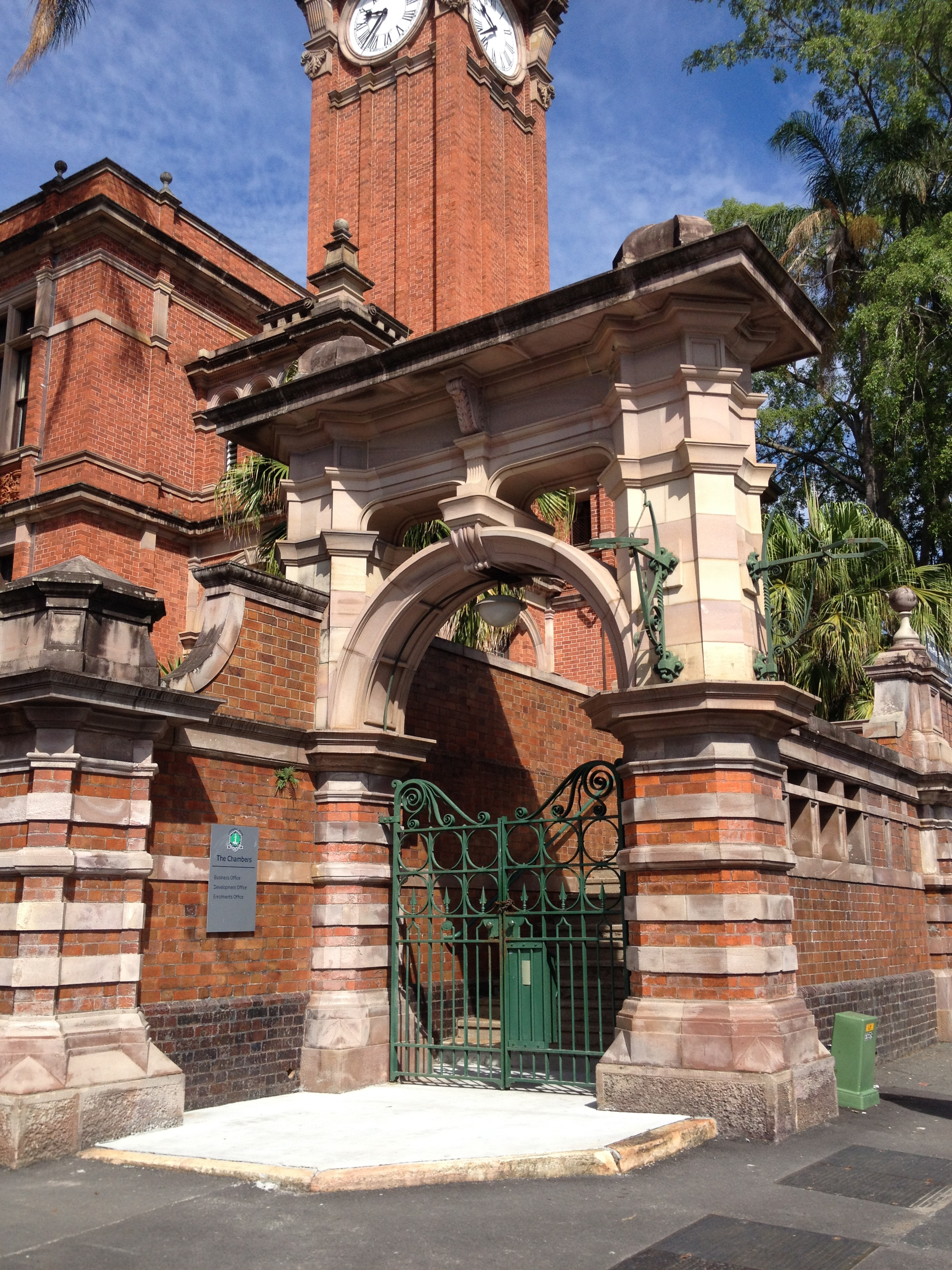
Entrance via "The Chambers"

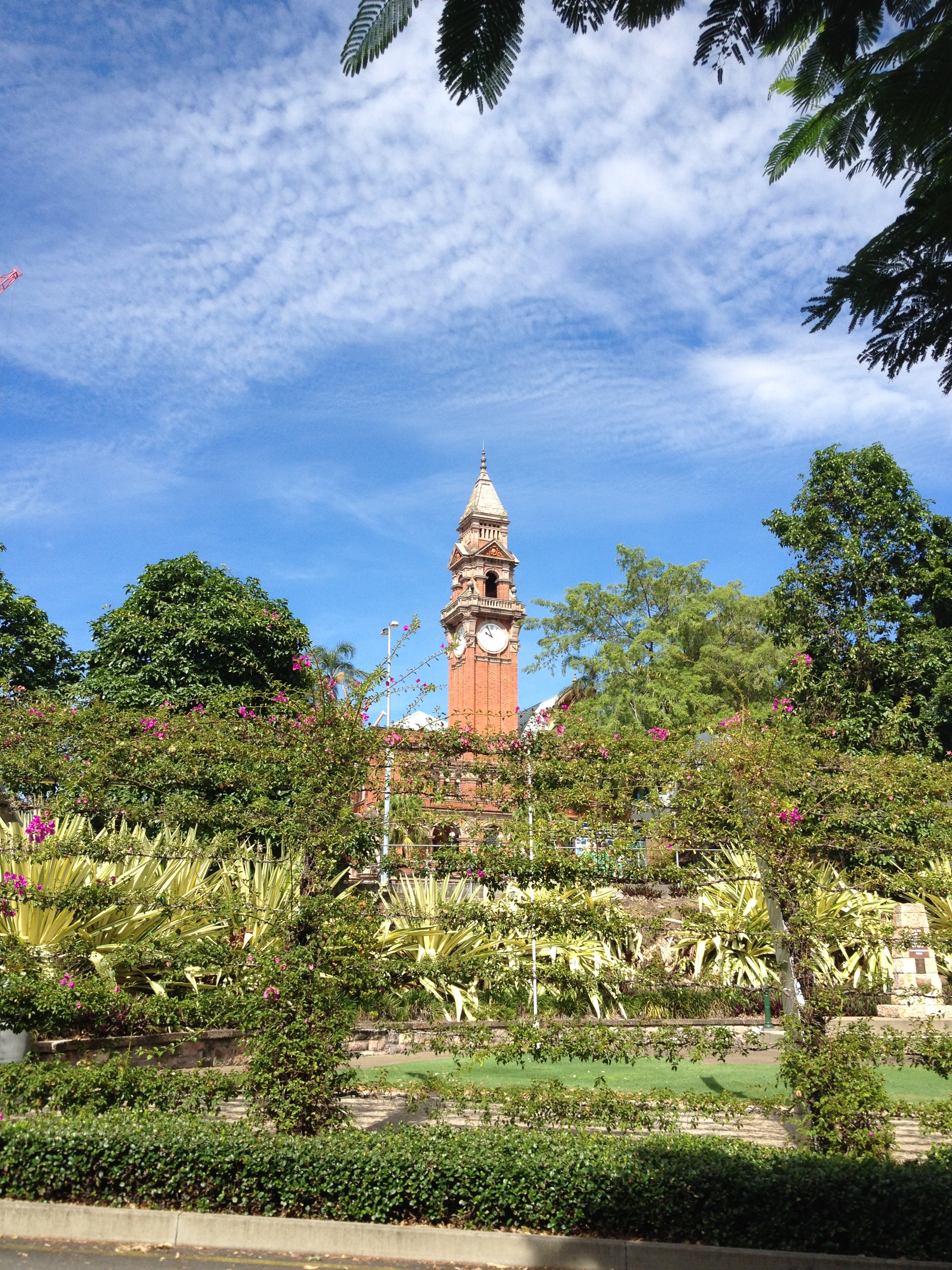
Somerville House gardens

== School badge ==
The School Badge appeared for the first time on the cover of the June Magazine in 1902, and was designed by architect, Robin Dods. The central figure represents Wisdom, standing upon or emerging from, the open book, representing Knowledge. In her hand is a lamp, representing Truth. The school motto Honour before Honours can be found at the base of the badge. The illustration is also a clear reference to the famous verse from Psalm 119:105 "Your word is a lamp to my feet and a light to my path."

In 1912 the original school colours of yellow and white were changed to navy blue and green. The colours of the School badge are blue, green and white, with blue associated with loyalty, green representing growth, and white representing purity.

From 1949, the name Somerville House surmounted the badge and the side letters of B.G.H.S. were omitted.

== House system ==
Somerville House utilises a house system. During World War II, a limited house system was first introduced to encourage participation in sport. The two houses were named Leslie and Cunningham, after two local pioneers. After the school was reunited at Vulture Street in 1945, it was decided to divide the school from Form IVA (Year 12) to Form IIB (Year 3), into four groups. The Houses (Chisholm, Franklin, MacArthur and Osburn) were named after outstanding women in Australian history. It was not until 1983, when the school had grown significantly, that two more Houses were started – Durack and Gilmore.

Today the school has six houses, each named after an Australian woman who was a pioneer in her field:

- Chisholm – Named after Caroline Chisholm
- Durack – Named after Mary Durack (née Costello)
- Franklin – Named after Jane Franklin
- Gilmore – Named after Mary Gilmore
- Macarthur – Named after Elizabeth Macarthur
- Osburn – Named after Lucy Osburn

The houses have competed for the Adamson Shield since 1947, a gift of Dr R V Adamson, father of a past pupil. In 1948, Mr D.J Drysdale donated a shield for competition in Choral singing between the Houses, which is still presented at the annual Choral Festival. Inter-house competitions held throughout the year, include a Swimming Carnival, Athletics Carnival, Cross Country, Hockey, Speedball (fusion of netball and soccer – frequently played in physical education classes at Somerville), Chess Competition, Senior School Choral Festival (Years 10–12), and Middle School Arts Festival (Years 7–9).

== Notable alumnae ==
Alumnae of Somerville House are known as Old Girls, and may elect to join the schools alumnae association, the Somerville House Old Girls' Association (OGA). The OGA was established in 1901. Some notable Somerville House Old Girls include:

Academic

- Ida Nancy Ashburn – Founding Principal of Clayfield College
- Abigail Allwood – geologist and astrobiologist at the NASA Jet Propulsion Laboratory
- Susan Caroline Bambrick – Consultant; Emeritus Professor at the University of Southern Queensland
- Isobel Bennett – One of Australia's most distinguished marine biologists
- Hazel Joyce Harrison (1905–1970) – kindergarten principal
- Margaret Hardy Fallding – Research zoologist
- Joan Kerr – Art and architectural historian

Business and philanthropy

- Ann Caroline Sherry – Chief Executive Officer of Carnival Australia; Director of Special Olympics Australia; Recipient of the Centenary Medal 2003
- Valmai Pidgeon – Leading figure in the Arts and the construction industry

Entertainment, media and the arts

- Olive Ashworth – Textile designer
- Betty Churcher – Artist and former Director of the Australian National Gallery
- Melissa Downes – Weeknight co-presenter of Nine News Queensland
- Melissa Dunphy – Composer
- Jackie French – Author
- Maude Garrett – Radio and television presenter
- Marion Grasby – Journalist and foodie
- Lindy Morrison – Drummer, The Go-Betweens
- Margaret Olley – Artist
- Amy and Emma Sheppard – Musicians, Sheppard (band)
- Ann Thomson – Artist

Politics, public service and the law

- Jane Lesley Aagaard – Speaker of the Northern Territory Legislative Assembly; Member for Nightcliff in the Northern Territory Legislative Assembly (ALP)
- Gracia Baylor – Politician (Liberal), Member for Boronia; One of the first two women elected to the Victorian Legislative Council (1979)
- Anthe Philippides – Judge of the Supreme Court of Queensland

Sport

- Tippah Dwan – Professional Netball Player
- Harriet Hudson – Olympic Rower and Bronze Medalist
- Isabella Holland – Professional Tennis Player
- Lisa Curry – Olympic Swimmer
- Lisbeth Trickett – Olympic Swimmer and World Record Holder
- Julia Price – Australian Women's Cricketer

== See also ==
- List of schools in Queensland
- List of boarding schools
- Education in Australia
