= James Fewings =

English cricketer (1849–1920)

James Fewings (3 October 1849 – 20 August 1920) was an English cricketer. He was a right-handed batsman and wicket-keeper who played for Gloucestershire. He was born in Bristol and died in Southampton.

Fewings made his debut in August 1872 against Nottinghamshire, against whom he scored a single run in the first innings in which he batted and a duck in the second.

Fewings' second and final first-class appearance came the following week, against Sussex - being bowled out by future Test cricketers James Southerton and Fred Grace for a duck in each innings.
