= Clayfield College =

Independent school in Queensland, Australia

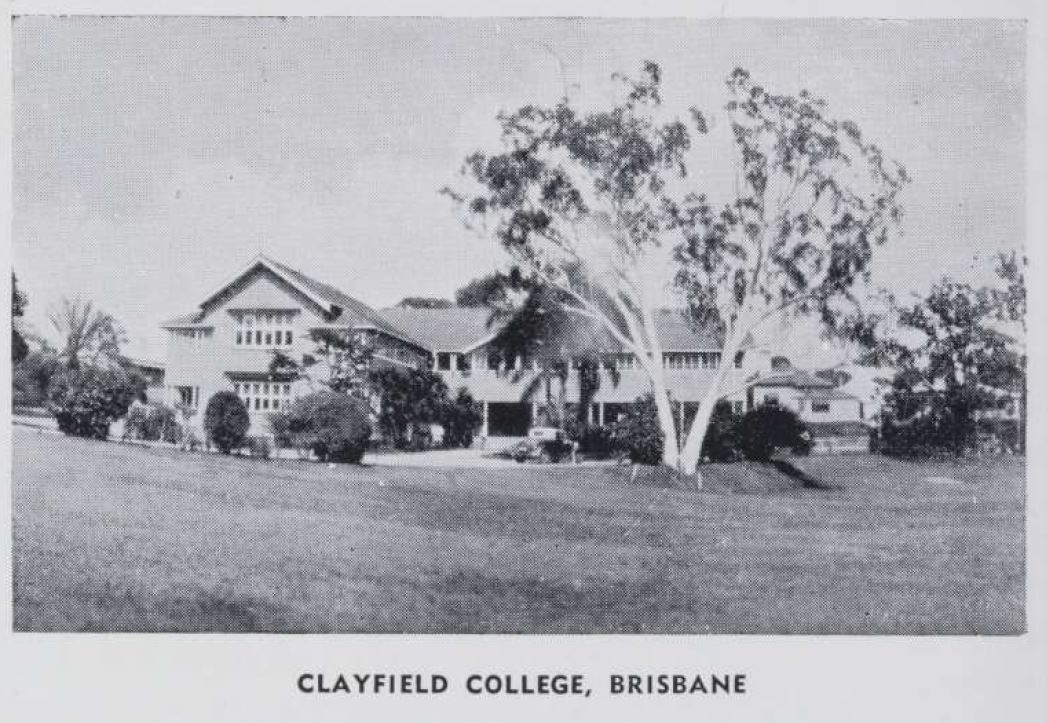
- Clayfield College, circa 1947

Location
- Clayfield, Queensland; Australia; 27°25′11″S 153°3′10″E

Information
- Type: Independent, day and boarding
- Motto: Latin: Luceat Lux Vestra (Let Your Light Shine)
- Denomination: Uniting Church and Presbyterian
- Established: 1931
- Principal: Dr. Andrew Cousins
- Chaplain: Reverend Paul Yarrow
- Grades: PP–12
- Gender: Girls and Boys
- Enrolment: 582
- Colours: Green, gold and blue
- Website: clayfield.qld.edu.au

Clayfield College is an independent, Uniting Church and Presbyterian, coeducational day and boarding school, located in Clayfield, an inner-northern suburb of Brisbane, Queensland, Australia. The College is owned and governed by the Presbyterian and Methodist Schools Association.

Founded in 1931, the College has a non-selective enrolment policy and caters for approximately 500 students from Pre-Prep to Year 12, including boarders from Years 5 to 12.

Clayfield College is affiliated with the Association of Heads of Independent Schools of Australia (AHISA), the Junior School Heads Association of Australia (JSHAA), the Australian Boarding Schools' Association (ABSA), the Alliance of Girls' Schools Australasia (AGSA), and has been a member of the Queensland Girls' Secondary Schools Sports Association (QGSSSA) since 1941.

== History ==
In September 2021, the College transitioned to be fully coeducational using the Parallel Learning model that sees girls and boys learning together from Pre-Prep to Year 6, then learning in single-sex classrooms for Year 7 through to Year 9. In Year 10 students come together for selected classes, and then coeducational classes in Years 11 and 12.

=== Principals ===
- 1934–1964: Ida Nancy Ashburn
- 1964–1990: Ida Kennedy
- 1991–2006: Carolyn Hauff
- 2007–2014: Brian Savins
- 2015: Melissa Powell
- 2016–2019: Kathy Bishop
- 2020–present: Andrew Cousins

== Curriculum ==
Students in Years P–10 study a core curriculum based on the Australian curriculum key learning areas. In Year 9, and again in 10, students may choose electives from within languages, the arts and technology as well as continuing to study in the other core learning areas.

English and Mathematics are compulsory for all students in Years 11 and 12. In addition, students elect to study four other subjects ranging from Arts, Business, Languages, Sciences, Social Sciences, Health & Physical Education and Technology. English as a Second Language (ESL) is offered throughout the Senior School to students from non-English speaking backgrounds.

== Co-curriculum ==
=== Sport ===
Sports offered by Clayfield College include artistic gymnastics, basketball, athletics, badminton, cricket, cross country, hockey, netball, soccer, softball, swimming, tennis, touch football, and volleyball.

== Notable alumnae ==
- Tania Major – youngest person elected to the Aboriginal and Torres Strait Islander Commission; 2007 Young Australian of the Year
- Mallrat – Artist who has appeared within the top 3 of the Triple J Hottest 100, 2020, with her song Charlie.
- Jan McLucas – former federal Minister for Human Services; Senator (ALP) for Queensland
- Stephanie Rice – swimmer; Commonwealth Games gold medallist and Olympic gold medallist
- Karin Schaupp – classical guitarist
