= Presbyterian and Methodist Schools Association =

The Presbyterian and Methodist Schools Association (PMSA) is an independent joint not for profit organisation of the Uniting Church in Australia and Presbyterian Church of Queensland. The PMSA owns and operates four independent schools: Brisbane Boys' College, Somerville House, Clayfield College and Sunshine Coast Grammar School. All the schools owned and managed by the Association are located in Queensland.

Despite the name of the PMSA, the 1977 merger of approximately two-thirds of the Presbyterian Church, the entire Methodist Church of Australasia, and almost all of the churches of the Congregational Union of Australia formed the Uniting Church of Australia. All PMSA schools are guided by and practise ecumenical Christian values - relationships, care, ethics, personal development, excellence and celebration.

== See also ==
- Education in Australia
- Education in the Uniting Church in Australia
