= Eliza Ann Fewings =

Australia and Wales-based school teacher

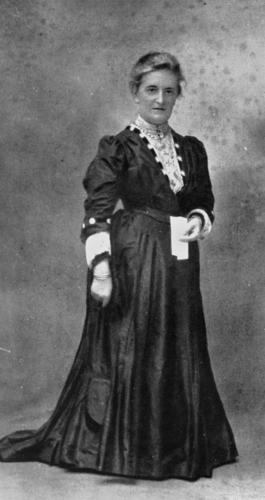
- Born: 28 December 1857; Bristol
- Died: 11 October 1940 (aged 82)
- Occupation: Headteacher
- Known for: founding Brisbane High School for Girls now Somerville House.

Eliza Ann Fewings (28 December 1857 – 11 October 1940) was a teacher and school principal in Wales and Australia. She led a pioneer school of secondary education for girls in Wales for a decade. Later in Brisbane, Queensland, Australia, she was the head of Brisbane Girls' Grammar School after which she founded her own school, the Brisbane Girls High School (which is now known as Somerville House).

== Life ==
Fewings was born in Bristol in south west England in 1857. Her father was in the boot industry but her brother was a teacher and he assisted her to become a teacher too.

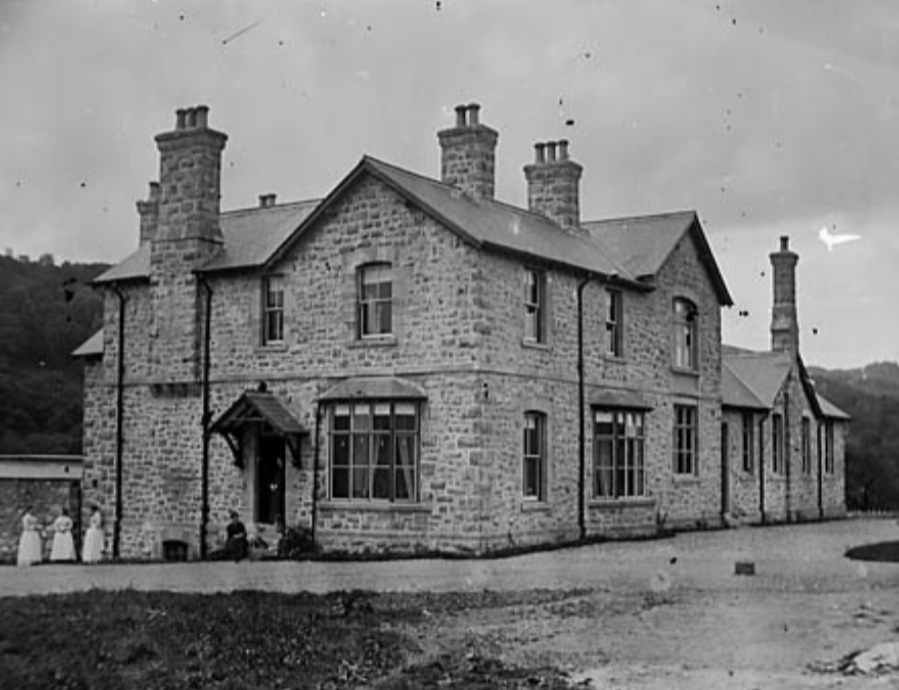
Dr Williams' School in Dolgellau in 1876

In 1876, she became the head of Dr Williams's Endowed High School for Girls in Dolgellau. She was to stay at the school for ten years. The school's motto was "Honour before Honours". The school was a pioneer in Wales because it was a secondary school for girls. One of the pupils in 1880 was Margaret Owen who to be "First Lady" of the UK during the first World War.

In 1896, Fewings became the head of Brisbane Girls' Grammar School which she led for three years until the governors were alerted to accusations that she was inadequate. Two of the governors who were leading barristers interviewed her and they decided that she should be dismissed. Her request for a review of the decision was refused. When the trustees turned up to ensure that Fewings handed over the keys to the school they were met by the local press. She did not leave quietly and the row between her and the trustees became public knowledge.

Fewings had the support of some of the previous staff and some parents and with their encouragement she opened her own rival school Brisbane High School for Girls. It started with 31 pupils in October 1899 but it was by 1902 the largest girls' secondary school in Queensland with 150 pupils. At first the school had operated without a uniform but in time a white and yellow uniform was agreed upon. The school motto was the same as Dr Williams' School "Honour before honours".

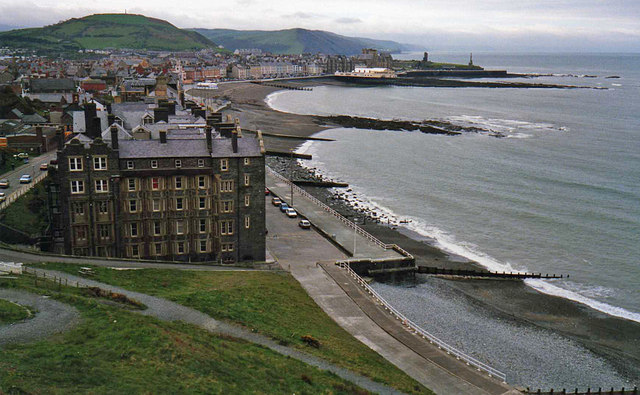
Fewings became the warden of the huge Alexandra Hall in Aberystwyth, Wales.

Fewing's success was acknowledged when she was asked to inspect schools in America and in the UK. Whilst she was in Wales she was offered the post of warden of Alexandra Hall as part of University College, Aberystwyth. She accepted and returned to Australia briefly to make her goodbyes and sell her school to Constance Elizabeth Harker and Miss Jarrett. When she returned to Wales she was instrumental in forming the first Young Women's Christian Association building in Wales. She retired in 1914 and she was given an honorary master's degree by Aberystwyth University in 1921.

She died in Bristol, Gloucestershire, in 1940.
