= Notnel =

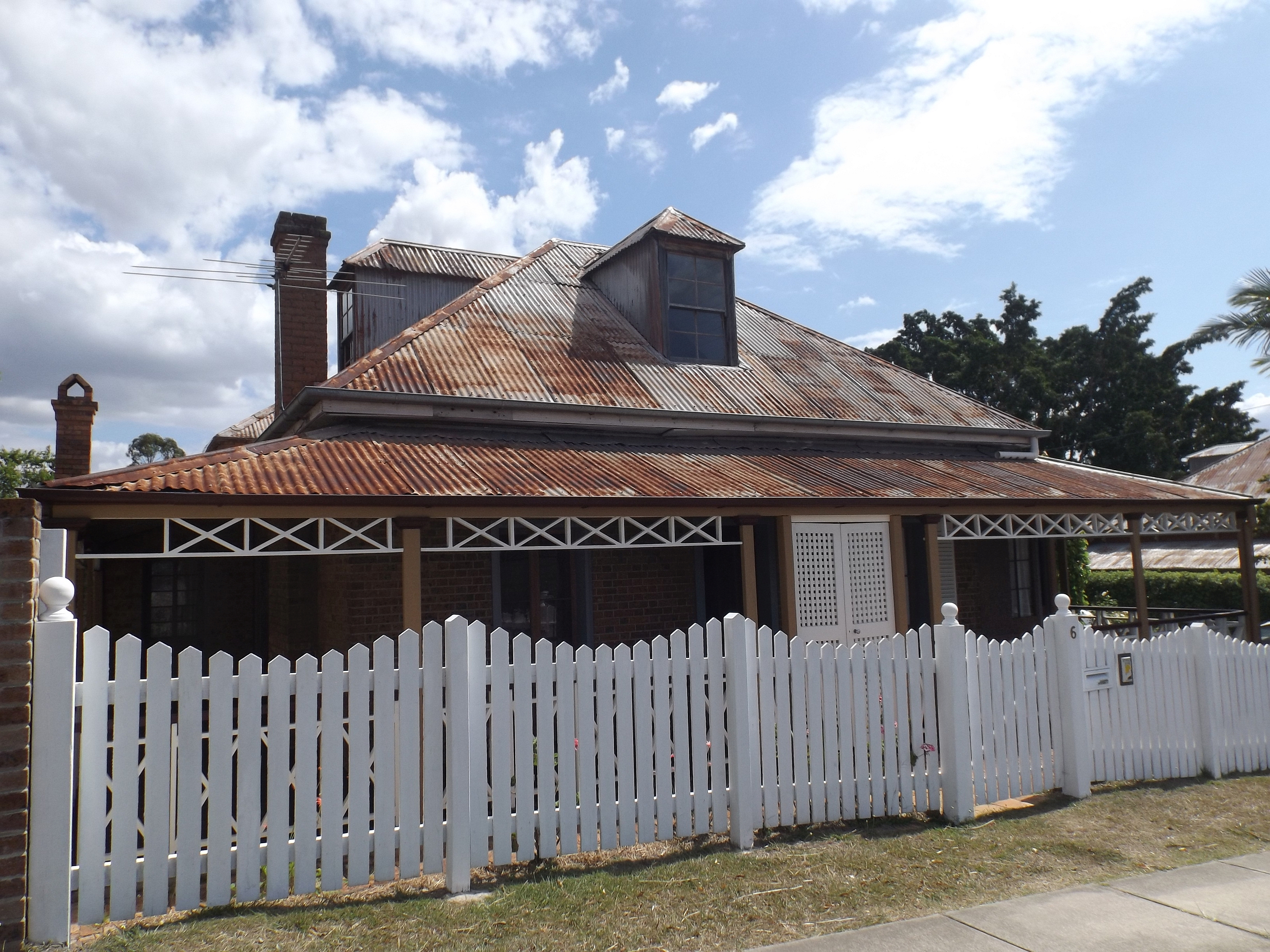
- Residence in 2015

- Location within Queensland Location within Australia
- 27.6161°S 152.7521°E
- Location: 6 Burnett Street, West Ipswich, City of Ipswich, Queensland, Australia

History
- Design period: 1840s–1860s (mid-19th century)
- Built: c. 1863

Queensland Heritage Register
- Official name: Notnel
- Type: state heritage (built)
- Designated: 21 October 1992
- Reference no.: 600571
- Significant period: 1860s (fabric, historical)
- Significant components: kitchen/kitchen house, residential accommodation – main house

Notnel is a heritage-listed detached house at 6 Burnett Street, West Ipswich, City of Ipswich, Queensland, Australia. It was built c. 1863. It was added to the Queensland Heritage Register on 21 October 1992.

== History ==
The residence at 6 Burnett Street, West Ipswich, is a brick house built c. 1863 for David McLaughlin.

The allotment on which this residence is situated was first purchased on 11 May 1855 as allotment 97, parish of Ipswich, county Stanley (1r 32.5p), by Patrick O'Sullivan at a cost of £31. O'Sullivan was born in 1818 in Ireland and at the age of 19 he was found guilty of assault with a bayonet at Canterbury, England, and transported to Australia. By 1847, O'Sullivan had settled in Ipswich where he worked as a shopkeeper and was elected to the Queensland Legislative Assembly in 1860.

By March 1857, the title to allotment 97 was transferred to David McLaughlin, an Ipswich builder. He was born in Newtown Limavady, in Ireland, and it appears that it was there that McLaughlin first became acquainted with William Leckey Ferguson, a bricklayer. Because Ferguson did not emigrate until December, 1863, McLaughlin and possibly William Leckey Ferguson's son, a fellow Irishman from Newtown began a building contracting business in Ipswich known as McLaughlin & Ferguson and which successfully tendered for work on the Ipswich Grammar School. As a builder, McLaughlin was in an advantageous position to have his own house built and Ipswich Municipal Council Valuation Registers indicate that a brick cottage and workshop existed on the allotment in Burnett Street as early as 1863.

In 1870, Council records indicate that Alfred Dann was the occupant. When sold it was described as "just the thing for a gentleman on the lookout for a town house" and intriguingly said to enjoy "sea breezes". Despite the enticements, the property remained in the ownership of David McLaughlin until June 1872, when title to the land was registered in the name of John North. North was born in Hertfordshire, England, and migrated with his sister to Australia in 1854 on board the Genghis Khan which is the same ship that brought David McLaughlin to Australia. Within 2 years North was living in Ipswich and working for the major department store, Cribb & Foote, where he remained in employment for over 40 years. By 1876, he had acquired allotment 98 adjacent to 6 Burnett Street from William Berry, the then owner of 1 Burnett Street. Ipswich Municipal Council records indicate that North demolished a timber cottage that had stood on this allotment and utilized it for the next 22 years as his garden.

North died at his Burnett Street residence in August 1898 and the property was passed to his wife, Laura Ann North, who remained there until she sold the estate on 1 February 1907 to George William Wesley Rylatt, a dentist of Brisbane Street, Ipswich. Ownership was then passed to Carl Friedrich Wilhelm Runge who was listed as the registered owner of the property in April 1920. Runge, who also owned 2 Burnett Street at the time, did not live in the house at 6 Burnett Street and continued to rent it until his death in 1923, after which time it was held in trust and eventually transferred to his son, also named Carl Friedrich Wilhelm Runge. After taking possession of the property, Carl Friedrich Wilhelm Runge junior sold allotment 98 as subdivisions.

By 1934, the title to the land had once again changed hands and George Hawley was registered as the owner of the property. The Hawley family had migrated to Australia from England and were farmers in the Fassifern Valley. The Burnett Street estate remained in the family for 56 years and it was named "Notnel" (Lenton backwards) by George Hawley in memory of Lenton Avenue where he had lived in England. In 1990, the title to 6 Burnett Street was transferred to a family which undertook substantial refurbishments and repairs to the property.

== Description ==
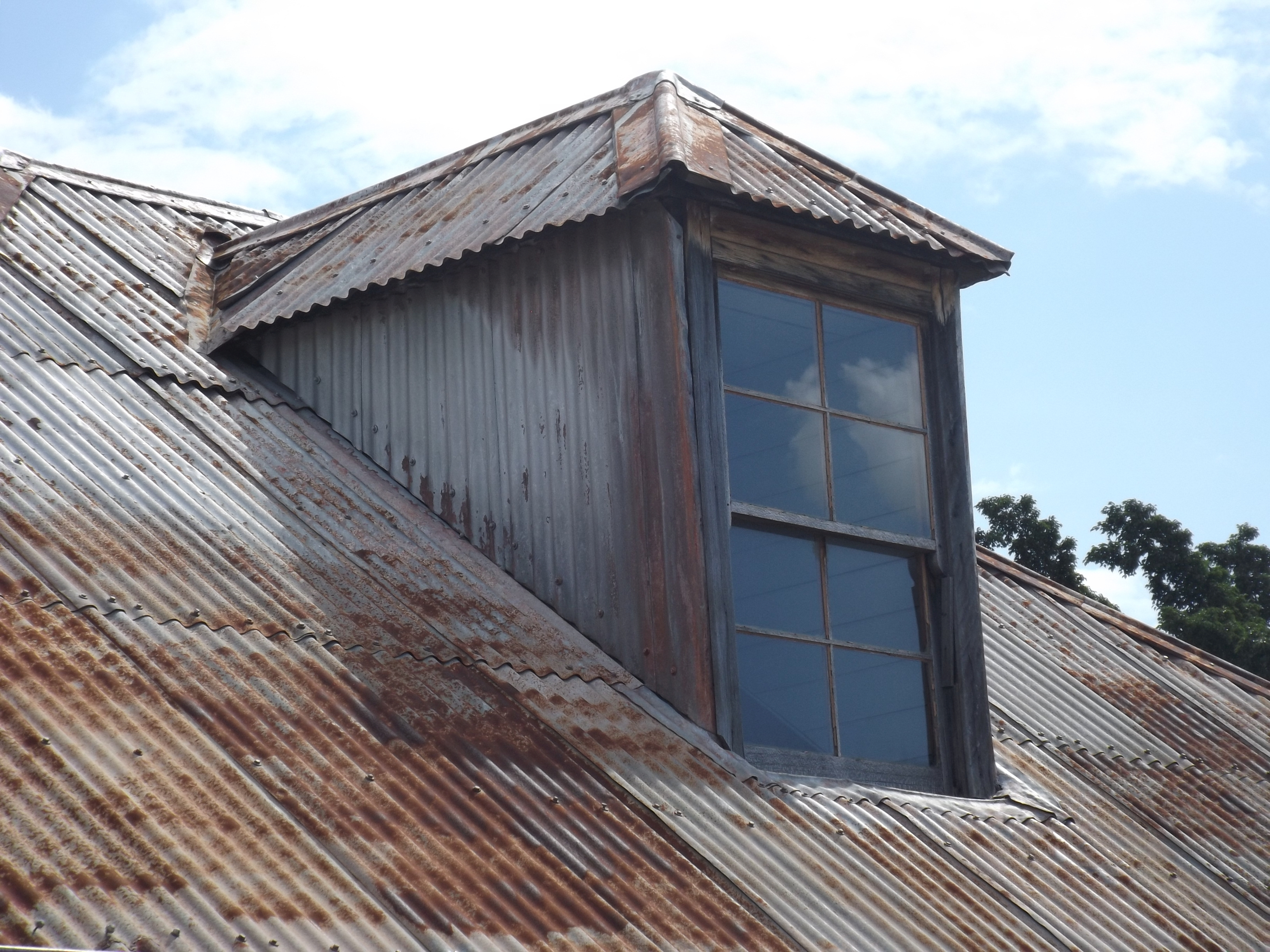
Rooftop, 2015

Notnel occupies a very large, long allotment that is 2,203 square metres (23,710 sq ft) in size and located less than one km from the Ipswich town centre. The house is sited close to the Burnett Street boundary, the front verandah edge being set back from it by only 1.8 metres (5 ft 11 in). Notnel does not enjoy the same elevated positions No.1 Burnett Street (William Berry residence) and Idavine do, however it overlooks a wide area to the west where the Ipswich Grammar School is located.

The front part of the single-storey house features a steeply pitched, short-ridge roof surrounded on three and a half sides by separate verandah roofs. Two dormer windows protrude to the north and east from this main roof structure. Their sides are clad in corrugated iron and their roofs are short-ridged. At the rear is a smaller pyramid-roofed structure separated from the front section by a short gabled roof. A small skillion roof abuts the rear sloping away from the pyramid-roofed structure. On the eastern facade the verandah roof continues over enclosed space to meet the rear skillion. On the western facade the verandah roof extends in front of the pyramid-roofed structure. The entire roof is clad in corrugated iron, with two brick chimney stacks protruding through it.

External walls are predominantly brick. Facing the eastern boundary and Burnett Street, the verandah edges are defined by square timber posts with simply carved capitals. Centred on the front facade is a set of double lattice doors held in place by recent, unpainted timber posts without capitals. Between the verandah posts are simple, timber handrails, and cross-braced balustrades and valances. On the western facade, aligned to the house's front brick face, a set of four full-height sash windows have been installed. The southern end of this facade is completed in brick.

Under the main short-ridge roof facing Burnett Street are four rooms. The front two are living and dining spaces. Entry is from the verandah and through the living room, which has a fireplace centred on its eastern wall. Entry to the dining room is through a door on the western wall. A further door from the living room opens into the short central hallway that separates the two rear rooms. The stairs to the single attic room start in this hallway space. All four rooms open onto the verandah with timber double doors.

A door from the short hallway opens onto the rear verandah area. Off this space to the left, access is gained to a single bedroom contained partly under the gable roof and the extension of the verandah roof. A fireplace is located on its eastern wall. To one's right is a bathroom, which occupies a corner of space contained under the west-facing verandah roof.

To the left along the rear, west-facing verandah, access is gained to the kitchen, which is contained under the pyramid roof. The overall height of this space and a remaining rim of skirting boards at approximately 2.5 metres (8 ft 2 in), suggest that there was once a room above the kitchen and access to this space is now gained by a set of narrow stairs. In the kitchen's southern wall is a large stove alcove. A door in the room's eastern wall opens onto a small covered space. This opens into a storage room. These spaces are under the last part of the extension of the verandah roof, the storage area abutting the skillion-roofed laundry on its southern wall. The laundry is accessed from the rear yard space.

== Heritage listing ==
Notnel was listed on the Queensland Heritage Register on 21 October 1992 having satisfied the following criteria.

The place is important in demonstrating the evolution or pattern of Queensland's history.

Built c. 1863, Notnel is one of Ipswich's earliest brick houses and remains important in demonstrating the evolution or pattern of Queensland's history and in demonstrating the principal characteristics of a particular class of cultural places. The house was constructed in a period characterized by high unemployment and poor economic conditions, however Ipswich emerged as a centre of business and industrial activity. The house remains one of Ipswich's finest and most significant examples of early Queensland domestic architecture from a period when the growing strength of the city was reflected in the more substantial residential buildings being constructed from the mid-1860s onwards. Built originally for David McLaughlin, a contractor, is an example of a substantial early house in the Ipswich area and remains of interest for its unique features such as the attic and dormer windows.

The place is important in demonstrating the principal characteristics of a particular class of cultural places.

Built c. 1863, Notnel is one of Ipswich's earliest brick houses and remains important in demonstrating the evolution or pattern of Queensland's history and in demonstrating the principal characteristics of a particular class of cultural places. The house was constructed in a period characterized by high unemployment and poor economic conditions, however Ipswich emerged as a centre of business and industrial activity. The house remains one of Ipswich's finest and most significant examples of early Queensland domestic architecture from a period when the growing strength of the city was reflected in the more substantial residential buildings being constructed from the mid-1860s onwards. Built originally for David McLaughlin, a contractor, is an example of a substantial early house in the Ipswich area and remains of interest for its unique features such as the attic and dormer windows.

The place is important because of its aesthetic significance.

Located on Burnett Street, Notnel also assumes an important aesthetic role in the historical streetscape of Ipswich. In a precinct shared with other heritage-listed properties, the house makes a significant contribution to the character of the area and stands as a well-preserved landmark of Ipswich's past.
