= William Berry residence =

Heritage-listed detached house in Australia

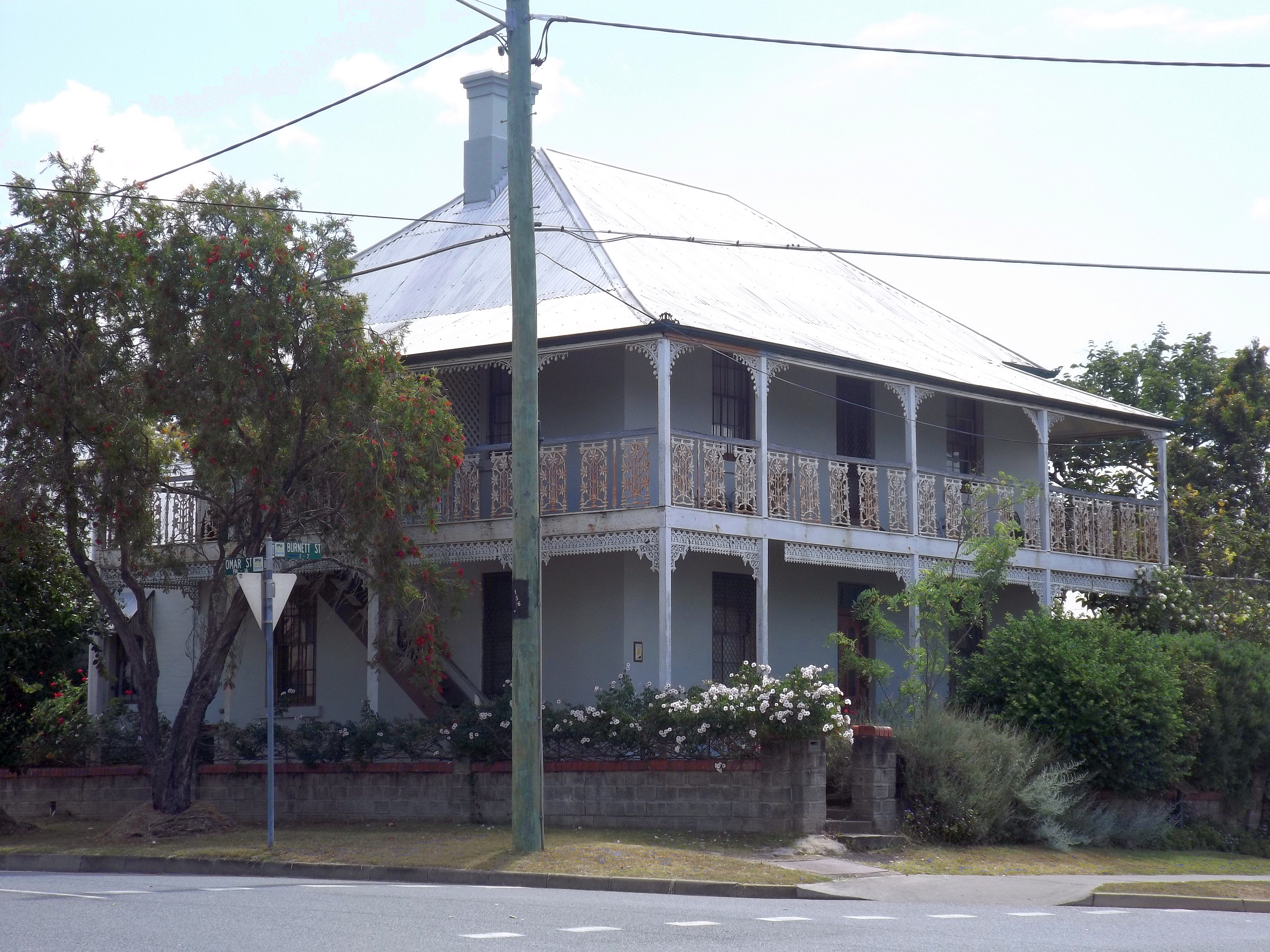
- Residence in 2015

- Location within Queensland Location within Australia
- 27.6162°S 152.753°E
- Location: 1 Burnett Street, West Ipswich, City of Ipswich, Queensland, Australia

History
- Design period: 1870s–1890s (late 19th century)
- Built: c. 1874

Queensland Heritage Register
- Official name: Residence, 1 Burnett Street (c. 1874), William Berry residence
- Type: state heritage (built, landscape)
- Designated: 21 October 1992
- Reference no.: 600570
- Significant period: 1870s (fabric); 1870s–1880s (historical)
- Significant components: kitchen/kitchen house, garden/grounds, residential accommodation – main house

The William Berry residence is a heritage-listed detached house at 1 Burnett Street, West Ipswich, City of Ipswich, Queensland, Australia. It was built c. 1874. It is also known as William Berry residence. It was added to the Queensland Heritage Register on 21 October 1992.

== History ==
The residence at 1 Burnett Street, West Ipswich, is a brick house built c. 1874 for William Berry.

The allotment on which this residence is situated was first purchased on 11 May 1855 as allotment 101, parish of Ipswich, county Stanley (1r 32.5p), by William Berry at a cost of £35. Berry was an Ipswich district farmer who was born c. 1811 in Aberdeenshire, Scotland, and by 1843 was resident in the Moreton Bay region. In March of that year he was one of the signatories to a petition to Sir George Gipps, Governor of New South Wales, requesting the sale of Crown Lands in the Moreton Bay area to be transferred from Sydney to Brisbane where the petitioners, "being Men of limited Capital", could afford to attend to purchase allotments. The appeal proved to no avail and in the subsequent Crown auction held in Sydney on 11 October 1843 Berry was among the first purchasers of Ipswich allotments. It is not clear exactly when Berry moved to Ipswich, however he was reputedly living there by 1848 and quickly acquired a distinct local patriotism. In 1849, he signed a petition that urged the then New South Wales Governor, Sir Charles Augustus Fitzroy, not to introduce more than a fair proportion of Crown prisoners to the Ipswich and Moreton Bay region on the grounds that their presence in the area would reduce the future prosperity of the district. Twelve years later Berry was again placing his signature to a petition, this time objecting to the incorporation of Ipswich as a municipality, which the petitioners believed "would be impolitic and injurious to the interests of the inhabitants".

Although extant records indicate Berry was a farmer by occupation, it is known that he was also a land owner and was referred to in his death documents as a freeholder. Between 1852 and 1854 he purchased three town lots in Cleveland, Brisbane, and in August 1866 the title to 2 Burnett Street was transferred to Berry. By 1870, Berry had also acquired Lots 98 and 99 next to 2 Burnett Street, and the area generally became known as Berry's Hill. Ipswich Municipal Council Valuation Registers indicate he utilized these allotments as his garden and he resided in a modest timber cottage at 1 Burnett Street until c. 1874 when Council records show a brick house was built on the property.

The construction of this larger residence was indicative of both Berry's burgeoning financial status and the increasing economic prosperity of the Ipswich region during the mid to late 1870s. It was an impressive house which Berry described, in an advertisement for sale in September 1886, as having a slate roof, eight rooms, kitchen, servant's room, bathroom and bath, large underground tank, two-stalled stable, buggy shed, wash house and other offices. In April the following year, Berry died suddenly at his Burnett Street house, aged 76 years.

Following Berry's death the property was held in trust by his wife, Margaret Berry, and George Miles Challinor, a clerk of Esk, until July 1889 when title to the land was transferred to William Berry's son, Alexander, although Margaret Berry appears to have remained as occupant of the house.

By March 1900, title to the property had been transferred to Paul Marcel Terlier who retained title to the property until 1945. During this period the allotment was subdivided, with one subdivision sold to the then owners of 2 Burnett Street, Sophia Helena Lewis and Norman Lewis, for use as a garden. The house remained on a reduced parcel of 24 perches and four-tenths of a perch. It was also during Terlier's ownership of 1 Burnett Street that the house was reputedly divided into flats and the verandahs enclosed with fibro sheeting.

In the 30 years after 1945, the property passed between 5 owners, until 1974 when it was registered in the name of Allan and Lily Maude Whybird. Allan Whybird had served as an alderman on the Ipswich City Council in 1964 and as Deputy Mayor between 1970 and 1973. He was also the grandson of John Whybird who established the first removalist company in Ipswich in 1857. The Whybirds carried out some internal renovations during their 10 years of ownership and replaced the original balustrading on the upper verandah with cast iron inserts obtained from the local branch of the Bank of New South Wales, which was demolished in the second half of the 20th century. By 1984, the property was used as a shelter for homeless youths and was owned by the Ipswich Independent Youth Service, before passing into the hands of new owners, who restored the building to its original function as a family home.

== Description ==
The house at 1 Burnett Street sits on a compact allotment, at a corner with Omar Street, approximately 1 kilometre (0.62 mi) from Ipswich town centre. It occupies a prominent position on a hill overlooking a wide expanse of the town. It is clearly visible at a distance when travelling along Limestone St and from the northern end of Burnett St where Ipswich Grammar School is located. There are a number of other houses on the eastern section of Burnett Street that are entered on Queensland's Heritage Register, including Idavine on the adjacent allotment and Notnel at 6 Burnett Street. Across the street, a number of timber vernacular cottages have been converted into a single restaurant.

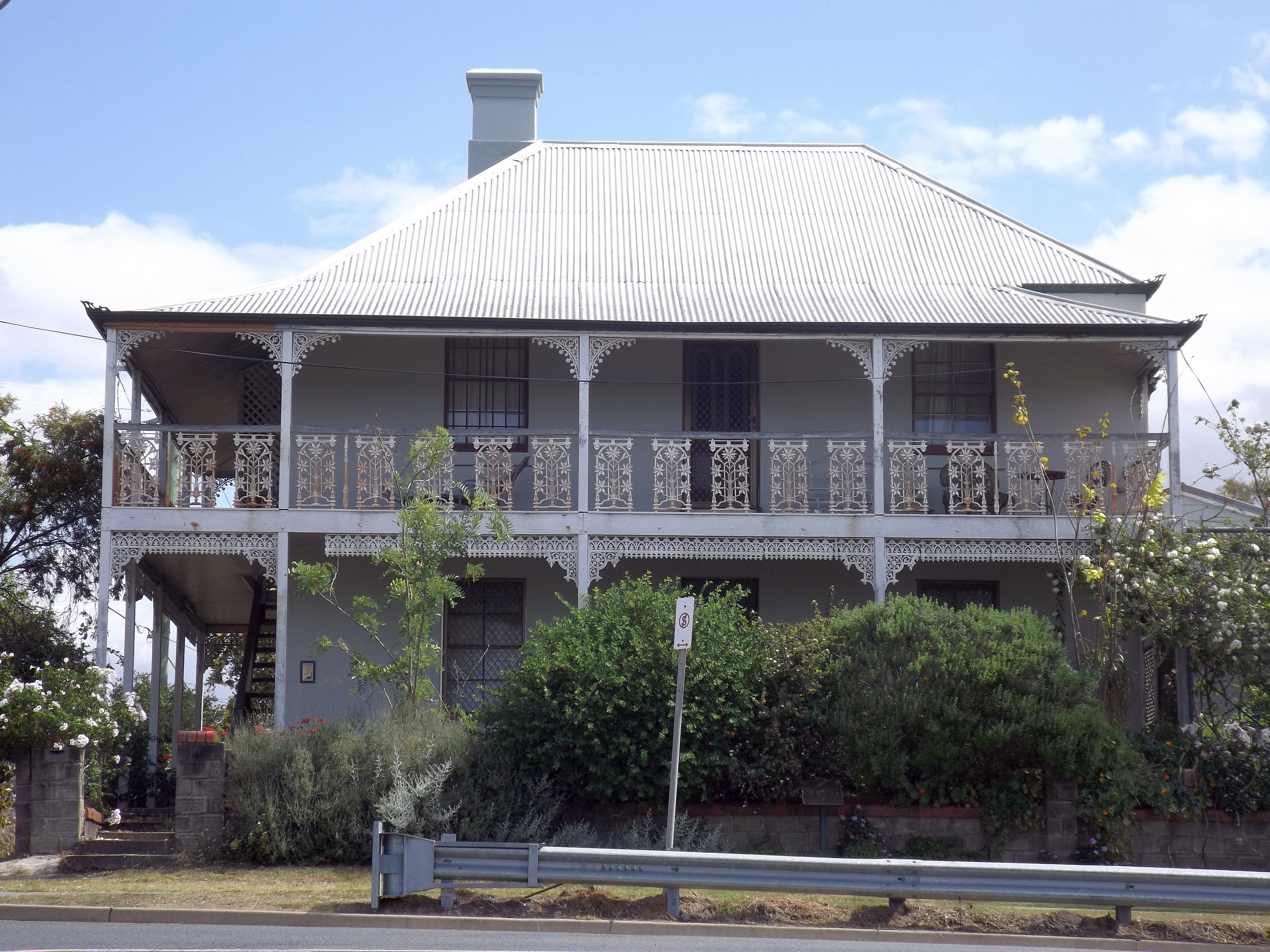
Building in 2015

The original house of rendered and painted brick is sited in the front eastern corner of the 617 sqm lot. The render has been scored to create the illusion of large masonry blocks. Its main roof is hipped with a short-ridge and sheeted in corrugated iron. The timber verandahs face the two streets with the eastern verandah edge sitting on the fence-line and the other setback approximately 1.2 metres (3 ft 11 in). Their roof is continuous with the main roof at a slightly reduced pitch. The upper storey's balustrading is cast iron obtained from elsewhere by the Whybirds. A number of balusters are missing, and some aluminium frieze pieces have been fitted around the lower storey. A photo taken late in the 19th century shows the original verandah edge made up of simple timber columns with capitals, carved brackets and horizontal pieces between them. One chimneystack protrudes from the main roof at the eastern end of the ridge and there is a lone acroteria decorating it. There is also a lone decorated soldered rainwater head fitted to the western face.

A flight of stairs rise through the verandah space overlooking Omar Street. They were likely built in the period prior to the end of the Second World War when the house was converted to flats. The stairs are screened with lattice and run between the two window rows on this facade.

One end of the gable-roofed, single storey kitchen abuts the main house on its southern facade. Its eastern face is in line with that of the main house. The steeply pitched corrugated iron roof has no overhang with the fascia fixed to the outer wall. This structure has painted brick walls and two hooded windows facing Omar Street and the east. The hoods are skillion with timber battening to the sides and a carved timber piece to the front. The two upper storey rear windows also have these hoods. The kitchen windows are sash with 6 panes in each leaf. A sunroom, laundry and covered patio separate the kitchen structure from the small square of garden to the house's west facing the neighbouring property. The sunroom's walls appear to follow a similar scheme to the main house using scored render. A steel sheeted skillion roof (Lysaght Klip-Lok profile) covers both, having no gutters.

Access to the tiled lower-storey verandah is gained from Burnett Street up a short flight of concrete stairs. The front door has a pivoting glass fanlight and opens onto a central hallway divided in two by an arched opening. The walls are plastered brick and a scraping has revealed a two-part colour scheme (light green atop dark, separated by a thin maroon band). Two rooms open to each side of this hallway. A set of stairs begins at its end and an opening to the sunroom fits under them. To the right are the living and dining spaces, which are joined by a broad archway. There is evidence that this wall was originally complete and featured a two-way fireplace, matching that which is found between the two rooms opening to the left of the hall. A section of brick chimneystack remains within the roof space. The ceilings are 3 metres (9.8 ft) in height and lined with 20-centimetre (7.9 in) wide beaded tongue-and-groove boarding. The boarding features a central dummy bead. The hallway's ceiling is lined in a similar manner.

A fibro sheet ceiling has been removed to reveal the ceilings boards, 2-part cornices and picture rail fitted at 2.5 metres (8 ft 2 in). The walls are plaster with a shaped timber skirting, matching the other rooms on this level of the main house. One window opens to the front and back of the house. They, as are all the others in the 8 main rooms are sash with 4 panes in each leaf. The windows and doors throughout feature painted timber architraves and reveals. The floors in the hallway, dining and living rooms are pine boards.

The two rooms opening to the left off the hallway are yet to have their fibro sheet ceilings removed. The mantelpiece to the fireplace in the front room is possibly polished Cedar, while the opposite one has been painted. It consists of a simple mantel top supported by two columns in relief. The arched cast register grates are still in place, the front rooms' being painted white. In the rear room, used as a bedroom, the brick hearth extends some 15 centimetres (5.9 in) with slates laid under the grate. The front room's hearth appears to be stone or concrete.

The stairs have been sanded back in places and appear to be made of Hoop Pine. They complete a 180 degree turn in making their way to the upper storey. Its layout reflects exactly that found below. The outer stringer is not continuous at the bend, suggesting some change has been made. A high window overlooks the stairwell. All internal walls are plaster as the ones below are. However the internal wall corresponding to that which separates the hall and living room below, has been breached to reveal boarding that matches the ceilings downstairs. There is matching joinery to all windows and doors. The room above the dining room has been converted into a bathroom. All ceilings are lined with fibro sheeting. They slope down to meet each external wall in a 30-centimetre (12 in) wide zone. The upper storey hall opens via a door onto the verandah. It is reported that the Whybirds lowered the level of this verandah, and this is evident in the three steps leading off this doorway. When this change occurred the original verandah timberwork was replaced. Bolts and nuts can be seen on the interior of certain walls where the verandah roof has been tied back.

On the ground floor, from the rear of the central hallway opens the sunroom. To the left are two doors leading through a thick wall to the large kitchen. Above the doors are fixed frames of rough painted lattice. Its ceiling is lined as the living and dining rooms' are and is sloped at each side. The boards at the south end of the flat section of the ceiling are all cut at a distance of approximately 80 centimetres (31 in) from the wall. This might suggest the existence of an earlier hearth. In the sunroom, on the wall shared with the main part of the house is a faintly visible curved line suggesting a curved roof may have been removed when the skillion was constructed. The line stops short of the current width of the sunroom.

=== Grounds ===
The fences to both streets consist of small columns and a base of concrete blocks cast to resemble rough-hewn stone. They are capped by red clay-bricks with bullnose edges that are laid stretcher face down. Between the columns of the Omar Street fence are fitted painted steel frames with bracing.

A two-storey pavilion, said to have been built by the Whybirds, occupies the rear western corner of the allotment, which is believed to be previously the site of the stables. On the ground floor is a double garage accessed by a driveway coming off Omar Street. Above this are bedrooms. A set of stairs and awning roof connect the pavilion with the covered patio attached to the sunroom.

== Heritage listing ==
The William Berry residence was listed on the Queensland Heritage Register on 21 October 1992 having satisfied the following criteria.

The place is important in demonstrating the evolution or pattern of Queensland's history.

The residence at 1 Burnett Street was constructed c. 1874 and is important in demonstrating the evolution or pattern of Queensland's history in that it is representative of the burgeoning economic fortunes of the Ipswich region during the mid to late 1870s. The original owner of the residence was a farmer and the construction of this large brick house is indicative of the prospect of rising social and financial status offered to early settlers as Ipswich developed into a wealthy commercial and industrial centre of Queensland.

The place is important in demonstrating the principal characteristics of a particular class of cultural places.

The house also assumes a prominent position in the Burnett Street area and is important in demonstrating the principal characteristics of a particular class of cultural places and because of its aesthetic significance. The house remains a well-preserved example of 1870s residential architecture and contributes to the overall historical character of the Burnett Street precinct.

The place is important because of its aesthetic significance.

With its rich historical milieu, Ipswich abounds with significant examples of early Queensland housing and architecture and as such this residence represents an important landmark in the local area and forms an integral part of the overall streetscape of the city.
