= Ipswich West State School =

Heritage-listed state school in Queensland, Australia

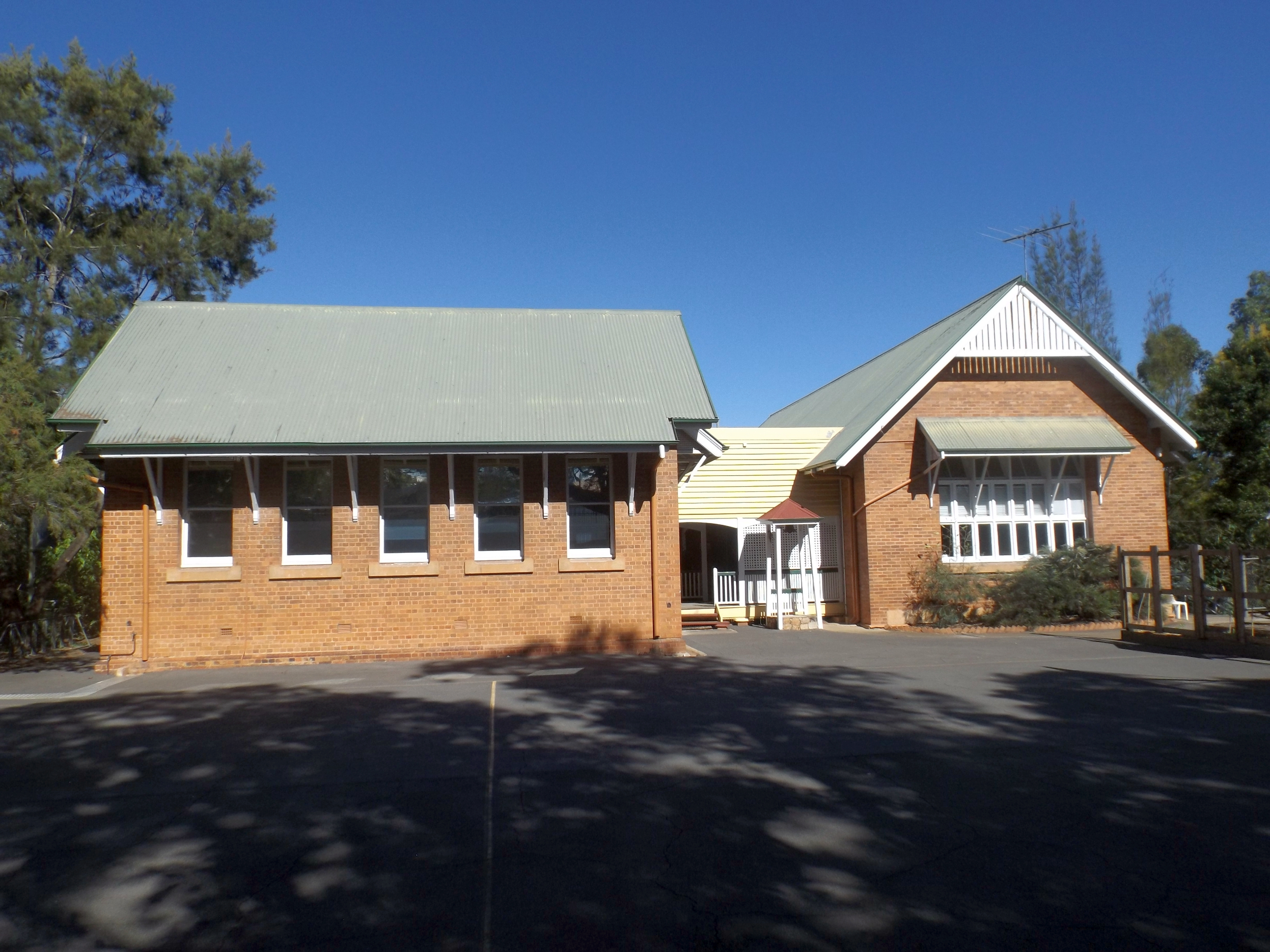
- Buildings, 2016

- Location within Queensland Location within Australia
- 27.6204°S 152.7512°E
- Location: 12 Omar Street, West Ipswich, City of Ipswich, Queensland, Australia

History
- Design period: 1840s–1860s (mid-19th century)
- Built: 1861–1919

Queensland Heritage Register
- Official name: Little Ipswich State School, Ipswich West Special School, Ipswich West State School
- Type: state heritage (built)
- Designated: 21 October 1992
- Reference no.: 600606
- Significant period: 1860s (historical); 1860s ongoing (social); 1860s–1920s (fabric)
- Significant components: tower – bell / belfry, classroom/classroom block/teaching area, school/school room, play shed

Ipswich West State School (formerly Little Ipswich State School) is a heritage-listed state school at 12 Omar Street, West Ipswich (formerly Little Ipswich), City of Ipswich, Queensland, Australia. It was built from 1861 to 1919. It is also known as Ipswich West Special School. It was added to the Queensland Heritage Register on 21 October 1992.

== History ==
The Ipswich West State School and Ipswich West Special School stand on a site which has been used as a primary school since 1861. Following the first Education Act of 1860 a government based education system was commenced in Queensland and schools began to appear across the state. In 1861, seven National Schools were opened in Queensland which included the coeducational school at Little Ipswich on 5 August. Little Ipswich (now West Ipswich) was an area of early urban settlement in Ipswich and in 1862 there were 52 pupils enrolled at the school.

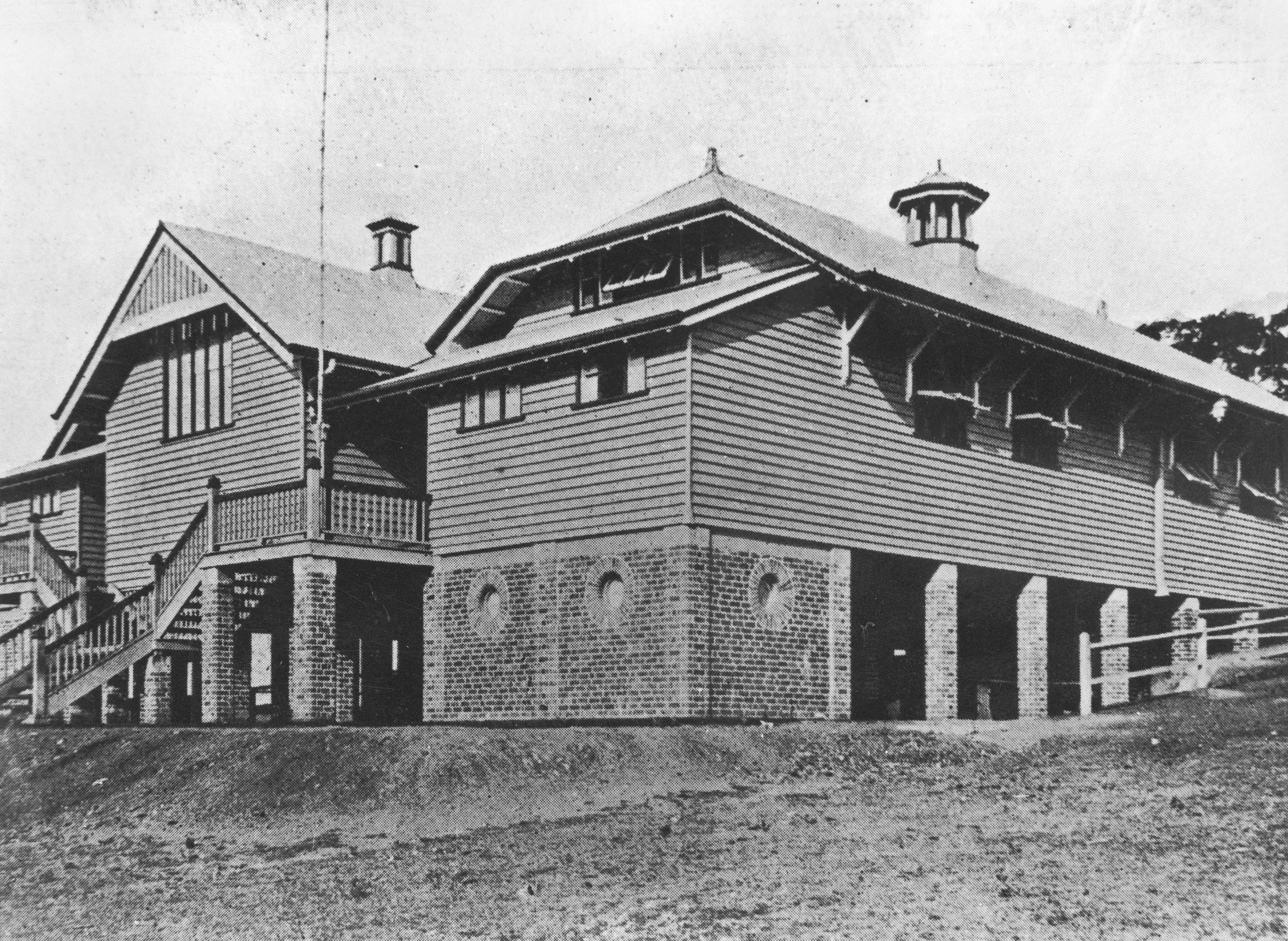
The Boys school

Later agitation by the Ipswich National School Committee forced the establishment of a separate Boys' and Girls' Schools and a new Boys' School Building was erected in 1882 on the site of the present Special School. Contractors Reuben Worley and James Whitehead erected the building at a cost of £621, of which £200 was provided by the local community in accordance with government legislation of the time. The Education Act of 1875 introduced free, compulsory education for children aged 6 to 12 years which prompted an increase in school attendance and a need for additional educational facilities. Local communities were required to provide one fifth of the cost of construction and the Department of Public Instruction provided a teacher and resources.

The school was erected to one of the standard designs of Robert Ferguson, Superintendent of School Buildings for the Department of Public Instruction from 1875 to 1893. This standard design was known as "Carpenter Gothic", a style used in metropolitan areas and provincial cities from 1880 to 1893. The design addressed problems in earlier school buildings by providing wider verandahs, ample floor space, play sheds, well protected hat rooms, convenient lavatories and decent offices. The design of these school buildings also reflected a change in attitude to the education of children as it responded to the concerns of educationalists including improved light and ventilation for students.

The former Boys' School building displays many of the original design features such as steeply pitched roofs, decorative finials and brackets at the end gables and diagonal boarding on the verandah ceilings. The grounds also contained a play shed, common in the Ferguson era, still standing today.

After the erection the Boys' School the girls continued to occupy the original 1861 school building. During the floods of 1893 the Girls' School was used for accommodating people who had lost their homes. Building of a new Girls' School began in 1907 and this involved construction of a brick wing by Harry Woodford at a cost of £613. In 1911 an additional brick wing was added by Wilson and Pickels contractors at a cost of £894/10/-. Work on the final section was commenced in 1919 at a cost £3,123 and was officially opened on 19 June 1920.

The gradual construction of the three brick school buildings from 1907 to 1919 reflected a change in the design and construction method of state schools due to the increased prosperity in Queensland in the early 1900s. Brick schools were all individually designed and were built in areas where a large population justified their construction. Brick schools were not commonplace which makes the Ipswich West State School buildings a good example of the type of school buildings erected in an established urban area during the period.

In 1934 the Boys' and Girls' Schools again became coeducational, occupying only the brick buildings, with C.W. Munro as the Headmaster. At this time pupils numbered 232 and remodelling of the school was undertaken at a cost of £682.

For twenty years the old Boys' School stood unoccupied and fell into disrepair. Demolition was resisted by the School Committee who carried out some maintenance and used it as a venue for fund raising functions. In 1957 vocational training for primary pupils of the Ipswich district was introduced and the old school became a manual training centre. The school is the now the premises for the Ipswich West Special School.

Recent additions to both school complexes include a new painted blockwork and timber covered way and classroom block designed by Bruce Buchanan Architects Pty Ltd and built in 1991 at a cost of $400,000 at the Ipswich West State School, and a new block designed by David Pagenden Architects for the Special School, also built in 1991.

== Description ==
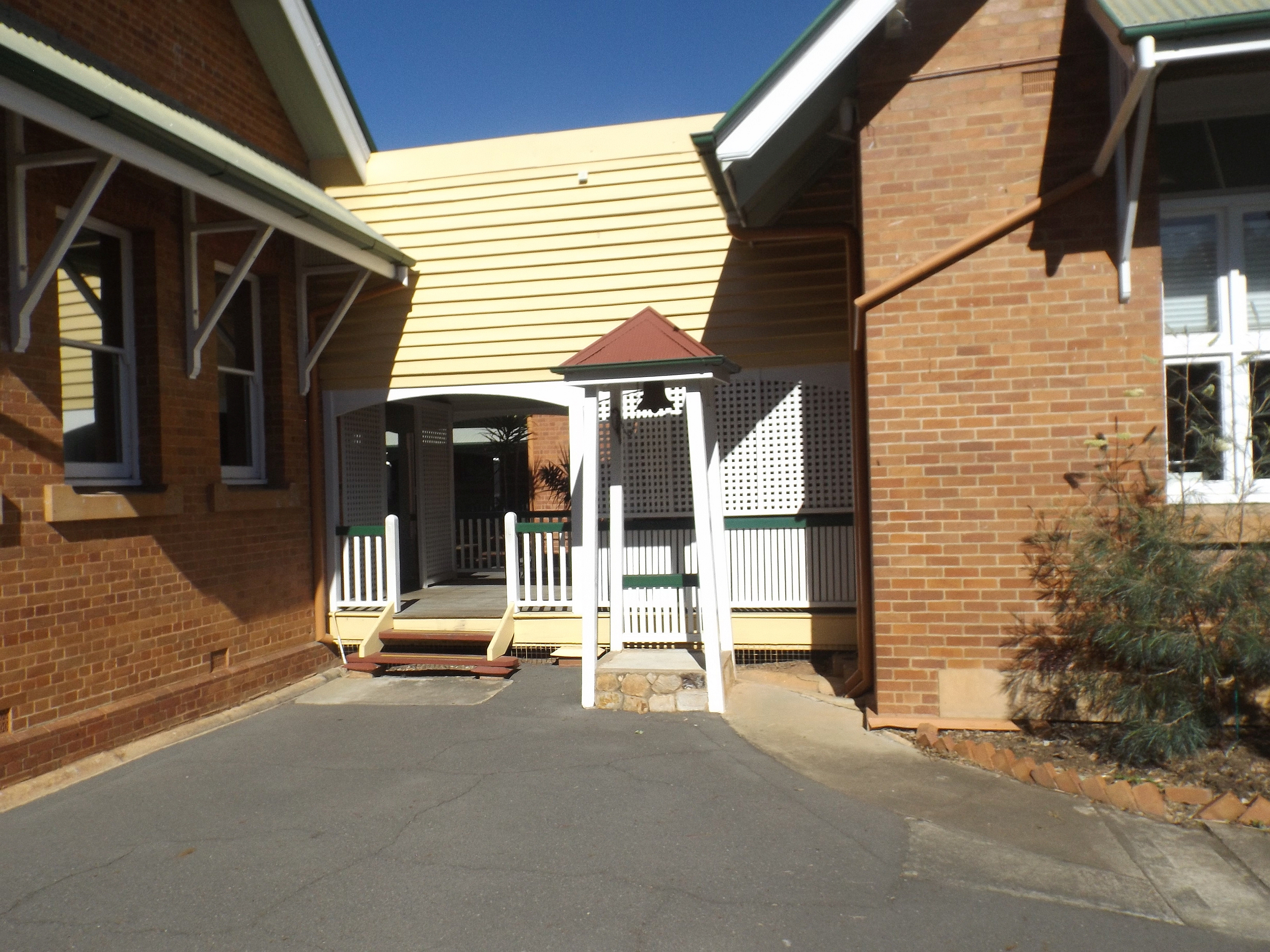
Belfry, 2016

The listing boundary encompasses two separate state schools on a single site - Ipswich West State School and Ipswich West Special School, both of which contain early school buildings.

Ipswich West Special School, at the northern end of the site, contains two early timber school buildings, constructed in 1882. These buildings are typical of the schools constructed during the Ferguson Era (1875–1893) of the Department of Public Instruction and are similar to the B/T4 Type, usually designed for medium to larger schools.

The two wings are set at right angles to each other and are low set, timber-framed buildings clad in chamferboards and supported on brick piers. They have steeply pitched gable roofs with stepped bargeboards to the original verandah spaces. Decorative timber brackets are set in front of timber louvred vents at each gable end. Each wing originally contained two separate classrooms with verandahs front and back. At each end wall a large bank of windows is protected by a timber window hood. The classrooms in the eastern wing feature tall, narrow timber windows which pivot from a central fitting. The original verandah ceilings are lined with diagonal boarding on top of the rafters. Classroom walls and ceilings are lined internally with horizontal boarding. The northern wing has a separate teachers room set at 90 degrees to the main building and accessed from the front verandah.

The northern wing retains one classroom with internal boarded finish, the other classroom has been divided with plasterboard partitions into office spaces. The eastern wing contains two classrooms linked by a concertina door. The rear walls to the verandahs have been removed and the verandah space incorporated into the classrooms. A new classroom block and covered walkway has been added at right angles to the eastern wing.

An early timber play shed is located in the Ipswich West Special School grounds. It is a gable roofed open structure of the B/T5 Type. Surviving early fabric includes large-scale timber posts with curved timber brackets. The posts have been cut off at the base and supported on steel stirrups. The play shed has been re-roofed and the end wall enclosed with steel custom-orb sheeting with weatherboards to each gable end.

Ipswich West State School contains three brick school buildings which were constructed between 1907 and 1919. Brick schools were not as common as timber schools and these buildings do not conform to a particular typology. Brick schools were usually individually designed and were built in areas which had a larger population.

The buildings are set in a U-shape configuration, and are of face brick construction with steeply pitched gable roofs. Decorative timber fretwork is a feature of each gable end, and the south and west wings have louvred vents behind the fretwork. The 1907 wing is separated from the adjoining western wing, the western wing abuts the south wing at one corner and all buildings are connected by a timber verandah. A separate room was constructed for the principal's office at 90 degrees to the west wing, accessed from the verandah. The verandah is simply detailed with slatted timber balustrades, lattice panels and curved timber valances.

The 1907 north wing is a low-set building with equally spaced double- hung windows to three sides. Separate window hoods protect the end windows and the roof is extended down and supported with timber brackets to protect the windows to the northern side. The eastern end of the verandah has been enclosed with weatherboards to form a storeroom. The interior ceilings are lined with tongue and groove boarding and feature a central lattice vent. The original single room has been divided into two offices with a recent glazed partition. Adjacent to the verandah is an early school bell. The bell hangs under a small pyramid roof set on four timber posts on a stone base.

The south wing appears to be the earlier 1911 building because the west wing has been joined to it at the corner and the end window of the south wing has been bricked in. The south wing is high set at the eastern end with toilets under the building. The toilet space is divided by single-skin vertically boarded partitions. The fixtures are recent. The upper floor of the building originally contained three separate classrooms which have now been converted to two classrooms with a multi-purpose space between them. The south wall has equally spaced double-hung windows protected by a roof overhang supported by timber brackets. A timber-framed addition with a hip roof is at the eastern end of the building, which is used for offices.

The west wing, probably built in 1919, is high set with play space and a tuckshop under the building. The upper floor originally contained three separate classrooms but has been modified to house the staff room in one original classroom space, with the library occupying two classrooms with the dividing wall removed. Large bays of casement windows to each end wall remain, with the top bay of windows set inwards at an angle. Window hoods with timber brackets and lattice panels protect these windows. Access to the classrooms is provided by double timber doors with fanlights above. A separate brick office, originally for the principal, is accessed from the verandah of this wing. It is a gable roofed extension set at 90 degrees to the building with a single double-hung window.

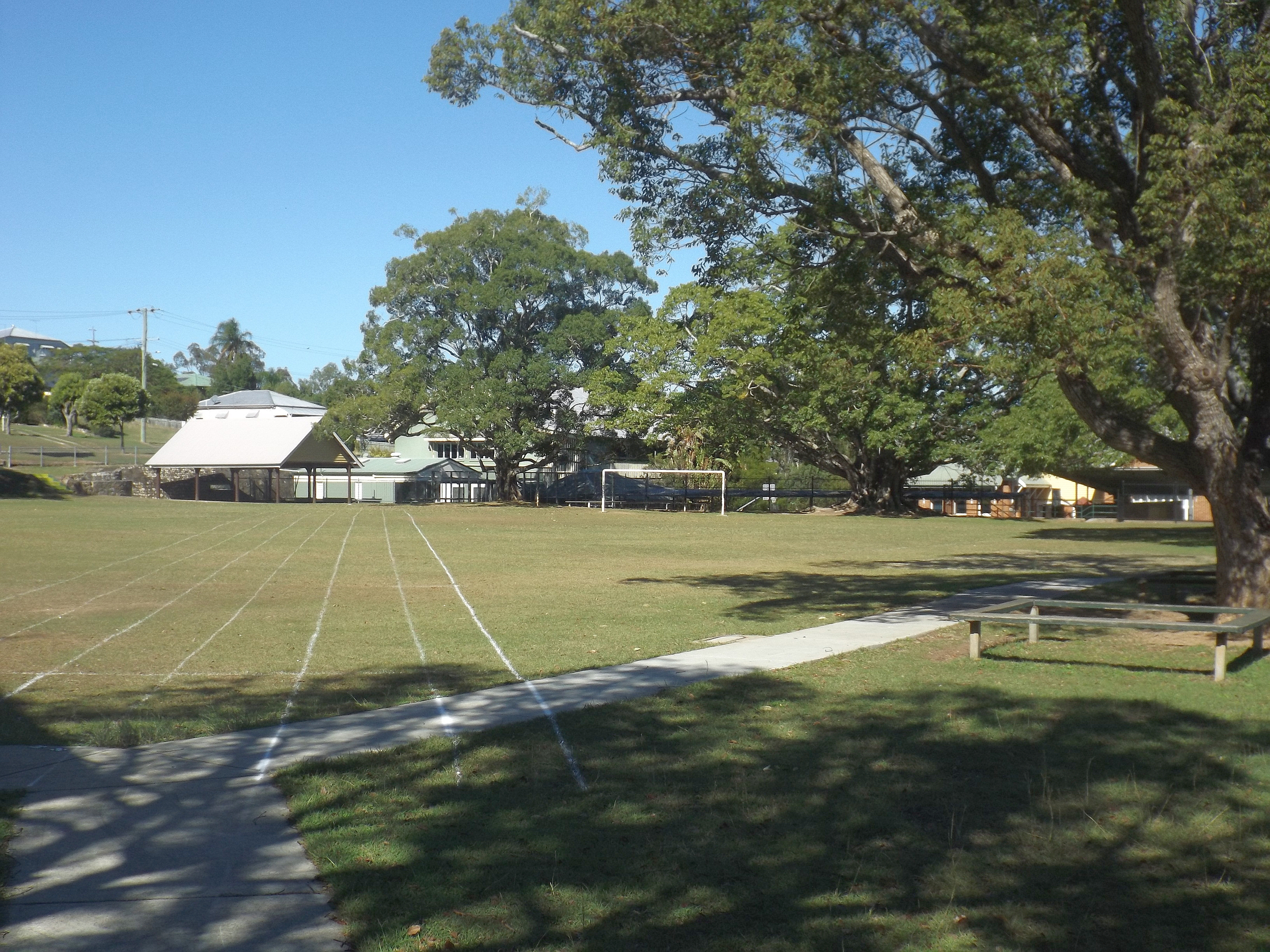
Sports oval, 2016

A brick toilet block stands to the east of the buildings. It is constructed of face brick with a hip roof and high-level louvred windows. Recent school buildings have been set well back from the early buildings and do not intrude on the setting.

== Heritage listing ==
The school was listed on the Queensland Heritage Register on 21 October 1992 having satisfied the following criteria.

The place is important in demonstrating the evolution or pattern of Queensland's history.

The school is important in demonstrating the pattern of Queensland's history as the layers of school buildings constructed since 1861 reflect the growth of Queensland's education system.

The place is important in demonstrating the principal characteristics of a particular class of cultural places.

They are also prime examples of two different architectural types of Queensland State School buildings which changed in response to practical needs, changing attitudes to education and social trends in local communities and the state as a whole. The 1882 buildings (in the Special School Complex) were built to the standard Ferguson design, "Carpenter Gothic", developed in response to requests by educationalists to improve standards of school buildings in Queensland. The brick buildings (in the Ipswich West State School Complex, 1907–1919) were constructed in a period which saw variance in design dictated by the size and wealth of the local community.

The place is important because of its aesthetic significance.

The two school complexes are of aesthetic significance, the brick buildings creating a visually consistent composition unobstructed by recent buildings and framed by mature trees in the school grounds. Both the brick and the earlier timber buildings are significant for their architectural composition and detailing e.g. the steeply pitched gabled roofs, timber brackets and finials, diagonal boarding and variety of window types.

The place has a strong or special association with a particular community or cultural group for social, cultural or spiritual reasons.

The schools have a strong association with the past, present and future generations of the school communities as a place of continuous education and recreation and as a focal point for the local community since 1861.
