= West Ipswich, Queensland =

West Ipswich Ipswich, Queensland
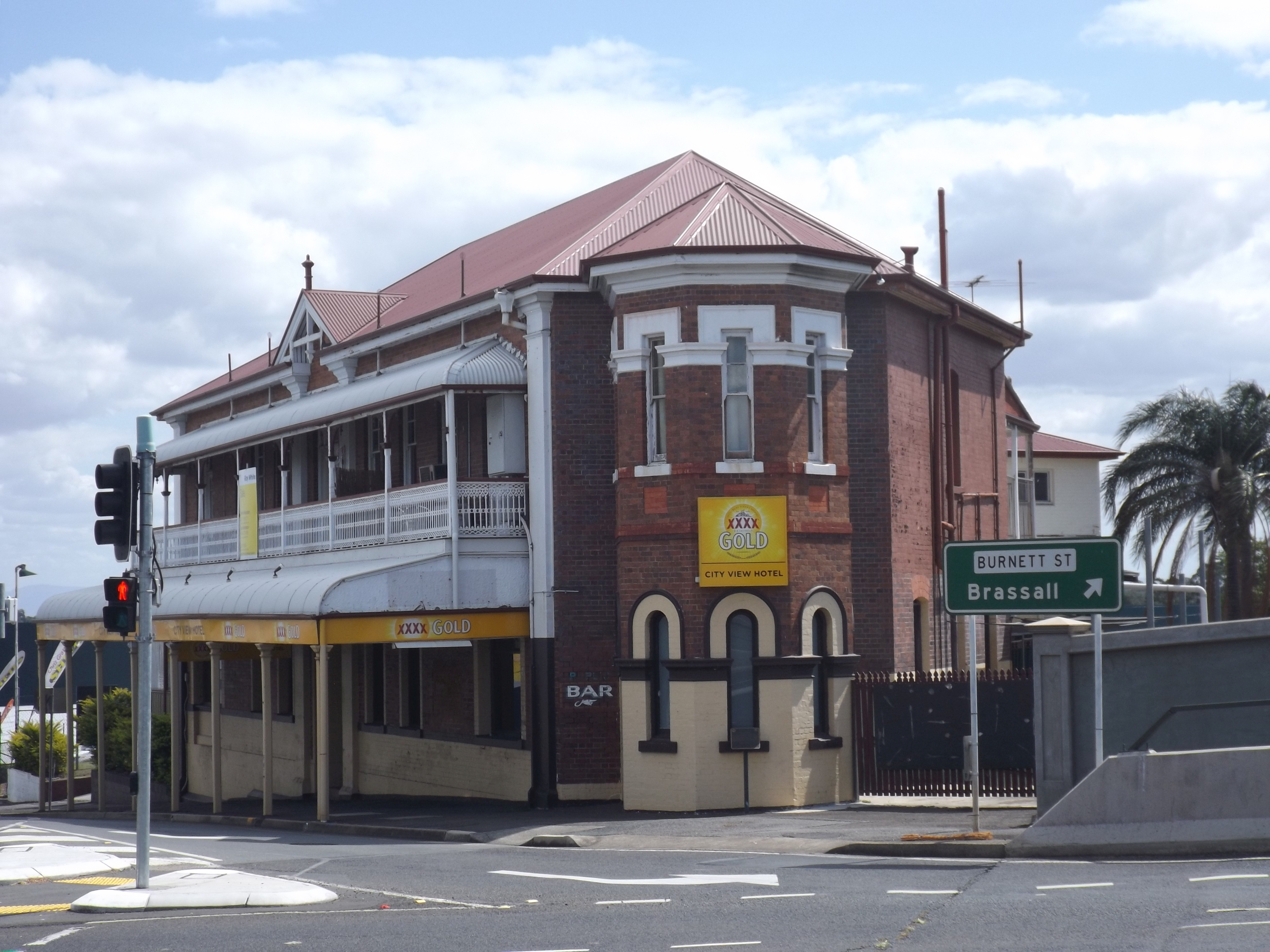
- City View Hotel, 2015

- Coordinates: 27.6202°S 152.7483°E
- Population: 512 (2021 census)
  - Density: 730/km^{2} (1,890/sq mi)
- Postcode(s): 4305
- Area: 0.7 km^{2} (0.3 sq mi)
- Time zone: AEST (UTC+10:00)
- Location: 1.4 km (1 mi) SW of Ipswich CBD; 43.8 km (27 mi) SW of Brisbane CBD
- LGA(s): City of Ipswich
- State electorate(s): Ipswich
- Federal division(s): Blair
Suburbs around West Ipswich:
Sadliers Crossing	Sadliers Crossing	Ipswich CBD
Leichhardt	West Ipswich	Ipswich CBD
Leichhardt	Churchill	Ipswich CBD

West Ipswich is a suburb of Ipswich in the City of Ipswich, Queensland, Australia. In the 2021 census, West Ipswich had a population of 512 people.

== Geography ==
The suburb is bounded to the west in part by the Bremer River, to the south by the river and Deebing Creek, to the north in part by the Main Line railway.

== History ==
West Ipswich was earlier known as Little Ipswich when urban settlers inhabited the area in 1840s. The suburb covered various prominent places such as Brisbane Street shopping area, the showground, Denmark Hill, etc., which were transferred to the central suburb of Ipswich in 1991. It still has many old buildings that date back to 1900s.

Little Ipswich State School opened on 1 August 1861 under headmaster William O'Donnell. The school was later renamed Ipswich West State School. On 17 September 1883, the school was splits into Ipswich West Boys State School and Ipswich West Girls and Infants State School. On 1 January 1934, the two schools were amalgamated to form Ipswich West State School.

The Little Ipswich railway station was on the Dugandan railway line from 1882 to 1964 and remained on the Churchill railway line after the closure of most of the Dugandan line in 1964. It was on the south-east corner of Pound and Keogh Streets (27.6218°S 152.7505°E).

Ipswich West Opportunity School opened in 1973 under principal Kevin Morris. In January 1979, it was renamed Ipswich West Special School.

== Demographics ==
In the 2016 census, West Ipswich had a population of 494 people.

In the 2021 census, West Ipswich had a population of 512 people.

== Heritage listings ==
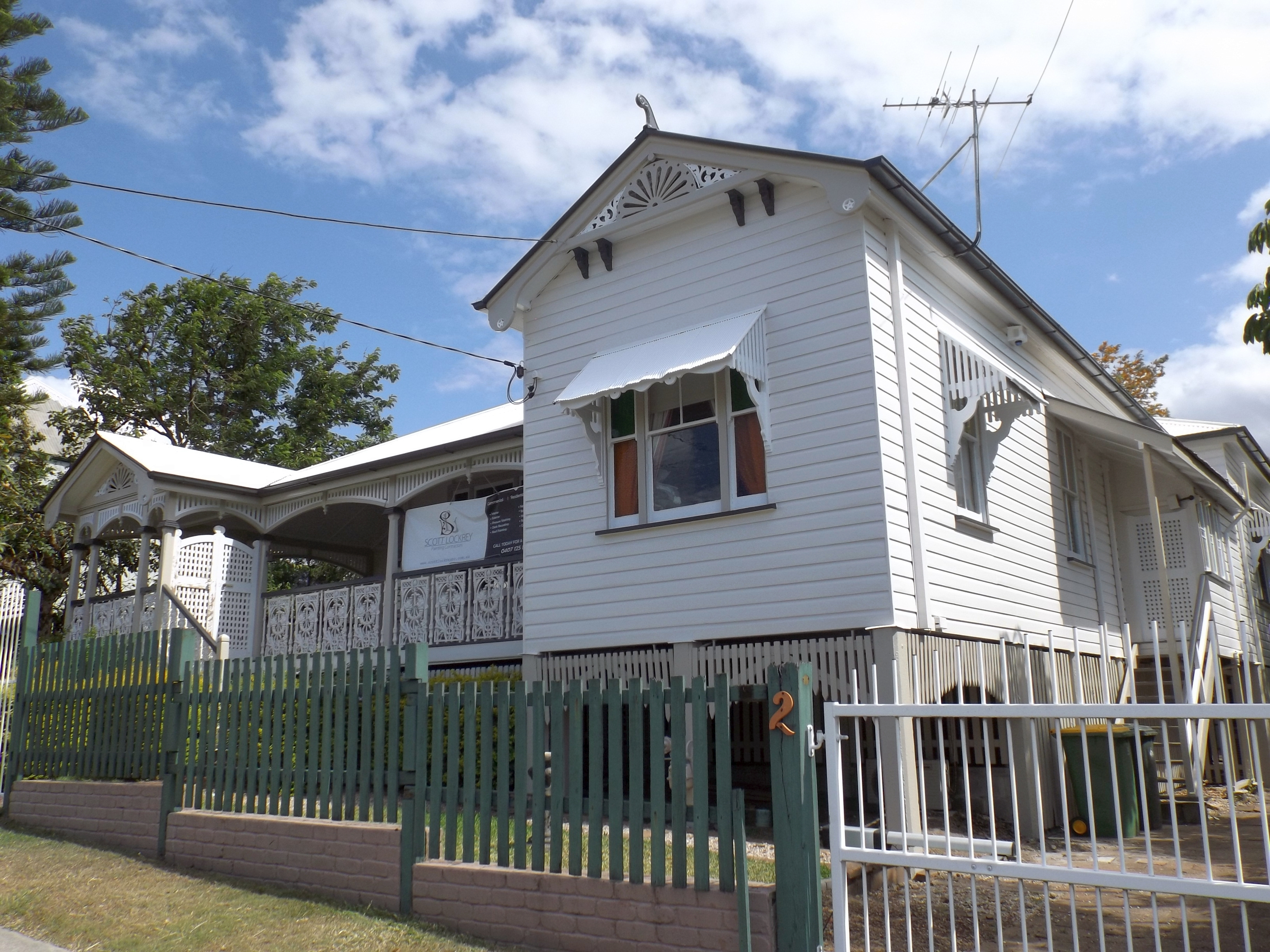
Idavine is a heritage-listed detached house demonstrating Federation-style residential architecture

West Ipswich has a number of heritage-listed sites, including:

- 277 Brisbane Street: City View Hotel
- 1 Burnett Street: William Berry residence
- 2 Burnett Street: Idavine
- 6 Burnett Street: Notnel
- 12 Omar Street: Ipswich West State School

== Education ==
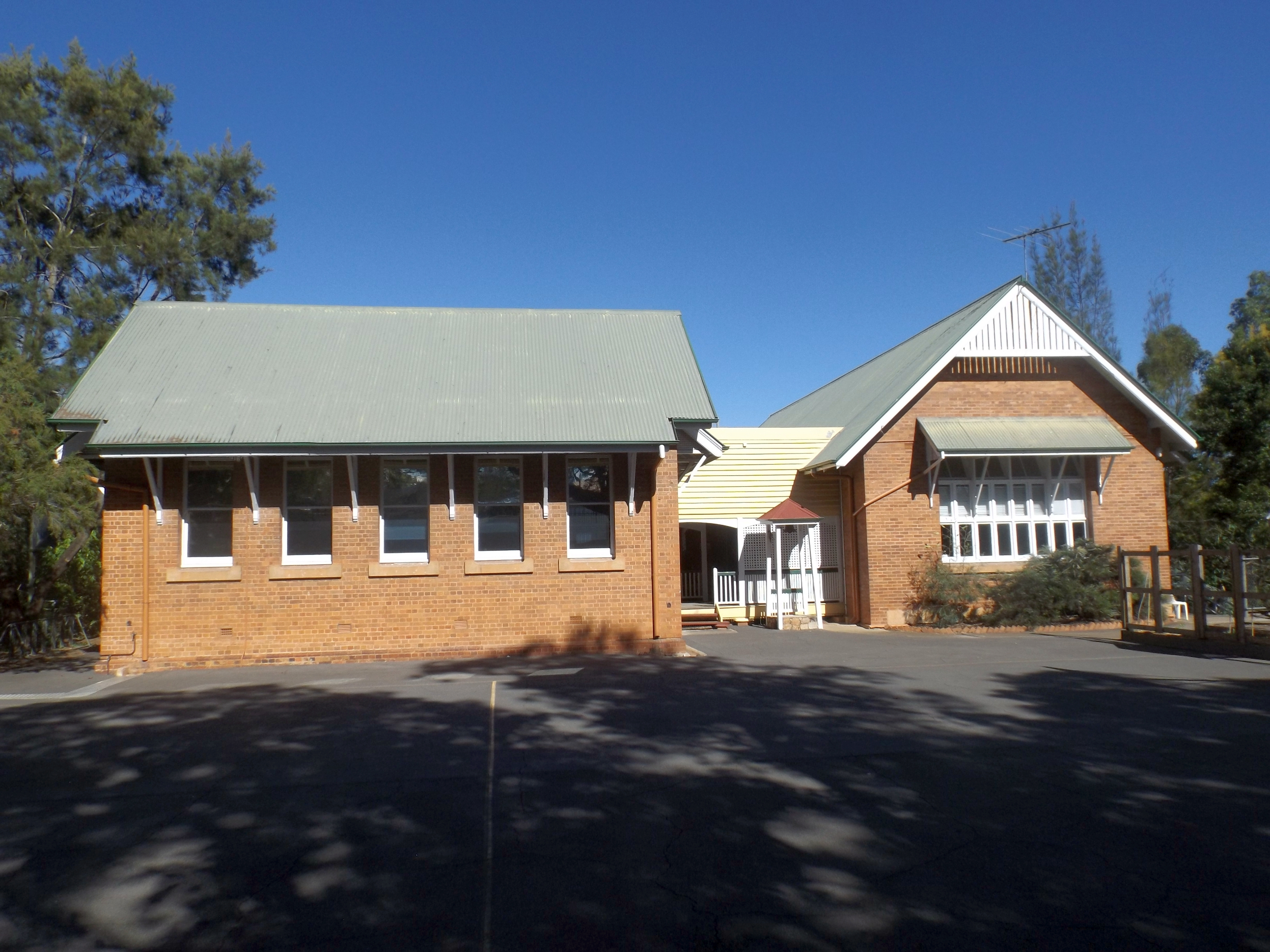
Ipswich West State School, 2015

Ipswich West State School is a government primary (Prep–6) school for boys and girls at 12 Omar Street (corner of Keogh Street, 27.6207°S 152.7506°E). In 2018, the school had an enrolment of 241 students with 16 teachers (15 full-time equivalent) and 14 non-teaching staff (10 full-time equivalent).

Ipswich West Special School is a special primary and secondary (Prep–12) school for boys and girls at 12 Omar Street (entrance on Tiger Street, 27.6195°S 152.7518°E). In 2018, the school had an enrolment of 88 students with 20 teachers (19 full-time equivalent) and 29 non-teaching staff (19 full-time equivalent).

There are no mainstream secondary schools in West Ipswich. The nearest mainstream government secondary schools are Bremer State High School in neighbouring Ipswich CBD to the south-east and Ipswich State High School in Brassall to the north.

== Amenities ==
Willey Street Park has a BMX track (27.6247°S 152.7540°E). The Ipswich and West Moreton BMX Club use this track.
