= Idavine =

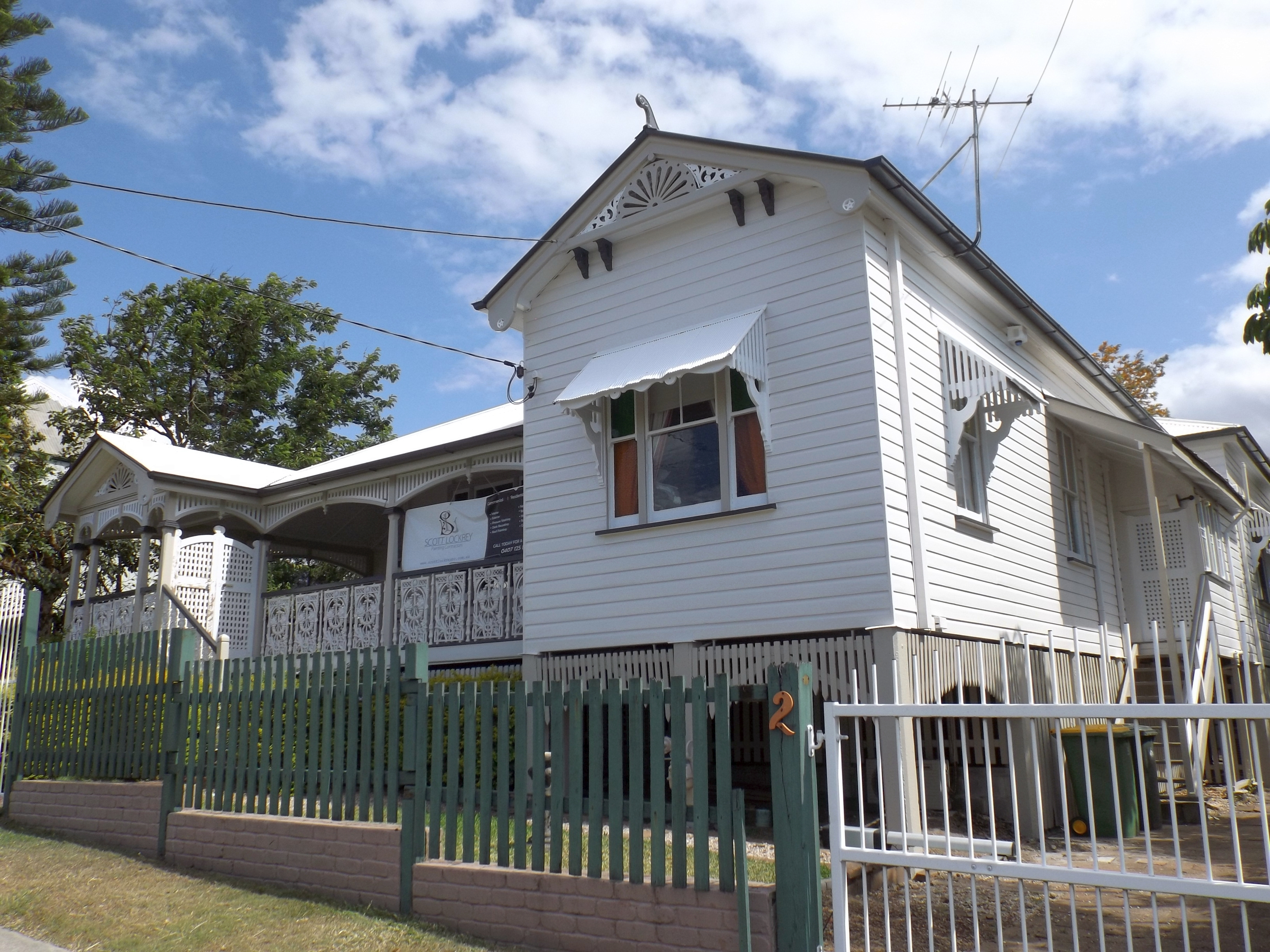
- Residence in 2015

- Location within Queensland Location within Australia
- 27.6161°S 152.7528°E
- Location: 2 Burnett Street, West Ipswich, City of Ipswich, Queensland, Australia

History
- Design period: 1900–1914
- Built: c. 1910

Queensland Heritage Register
- Official name: Idavine
- Type: state heritage (built)
- Designated: 21 October 1992
- Reference no.: 600572
- Significant period: 1900s–1910s (fabric, historical)
- Significant components: kitchen/kitchen house, residential accommodation – main house

Idavine is a heritage-listed detached house at 2 Burnett Street, West Ipswich, City of Ipswich, Queensland, Australia. It was built c. 1910. It was added to the Queensland Heritage Register on 21 October 1992.

== History ==
Idavine, a residence at 2 Burnett Street, West Ipswich, is a timber house for which existing evidence indicates a construction date during the Federation Period.

The allotment on which this residence is situated was first alienated in 1855 as allotment 100, parish of Ipswich, county Stanley (1 rood 32.5 perches (1,830 m^{2})), by Henry Mort at a cost of £25. Mort was a pastoralist and company director as well as a member of the New South Wales Legislative Council between 1881 and 1900. The allotment appears to have remained unoccupied during the 11 years of Mort's ownership.

In August 1866, the title to allotment 100 was transferred to William Berry, an Ipswich district farmer. Although extant records indicate Berry was a farmer by occupation, it is known that he was also a land owner and was referred to in his death documents as a freeholder. Between 1852 and 1854 he purchased three town lots in Cleveland, Brisbane, and in 1855 was the owner of the property, adjacent to 2 Burnett Street, at 1 Burnett Street (allotment 101). Berry resided in a modest timber cottage at 1 Burnett Street until c. 1874 when he built a brick house and Ipswich Municipal Council Valuation Registers indicate he utilized allotment 100 (2 Burnett Street) as his garden. By 1870, Berry had also acquired Lots 98 and 99 next to 2 Burnett Street, and the area became generally known as Berry's Hill.

Despite Berry's real estate interests in Burnett Street, allotment 100 remained unimproved during his ownership. In 1886 title to the land was transferred to August Knopke and it appears that Knopke erected a timber house on the property c. 1887-88 as his residence, as indicated in the Ipswich Municipal Council Valuation Register for 1888.

No documentary evidence exists to definitively date the residence which is now located at 2 Burnett Street, however the overall form of the house, ascertained through site inspection, suggests it was built in the Federation period, possibly after the turn of the century. It is unlikely that the current house was constructed by August Knopke and the link between the name "Idavine" and its owner in 1913, Ida Retschlag (née Boettcher), may be significant.

Retschlag remained as the registered owner of the property until 1918 when it passed into the hands of Sophia Helena Lewis, daughter of Carl Friedrich Wilhelm Runge & Wilhelmine Charlotte Runge. The property remained in the Lewis-Runge family for the next 60 years and it was reputedly during this period that the house was at one-time used as flats. It is significant to note that following the establishment of an immigration incentive scheme in Germany during the late 19th century, German emigrants formed close communities in many Queensland towns and the association of this house with German owners from 1886 onwards is symptomatic of their influential presence in the Ipswich area.

Since the mid-1970s, the property has passed between several owners and remains a well-preserved example of the architectural style of its era.

== Description ==
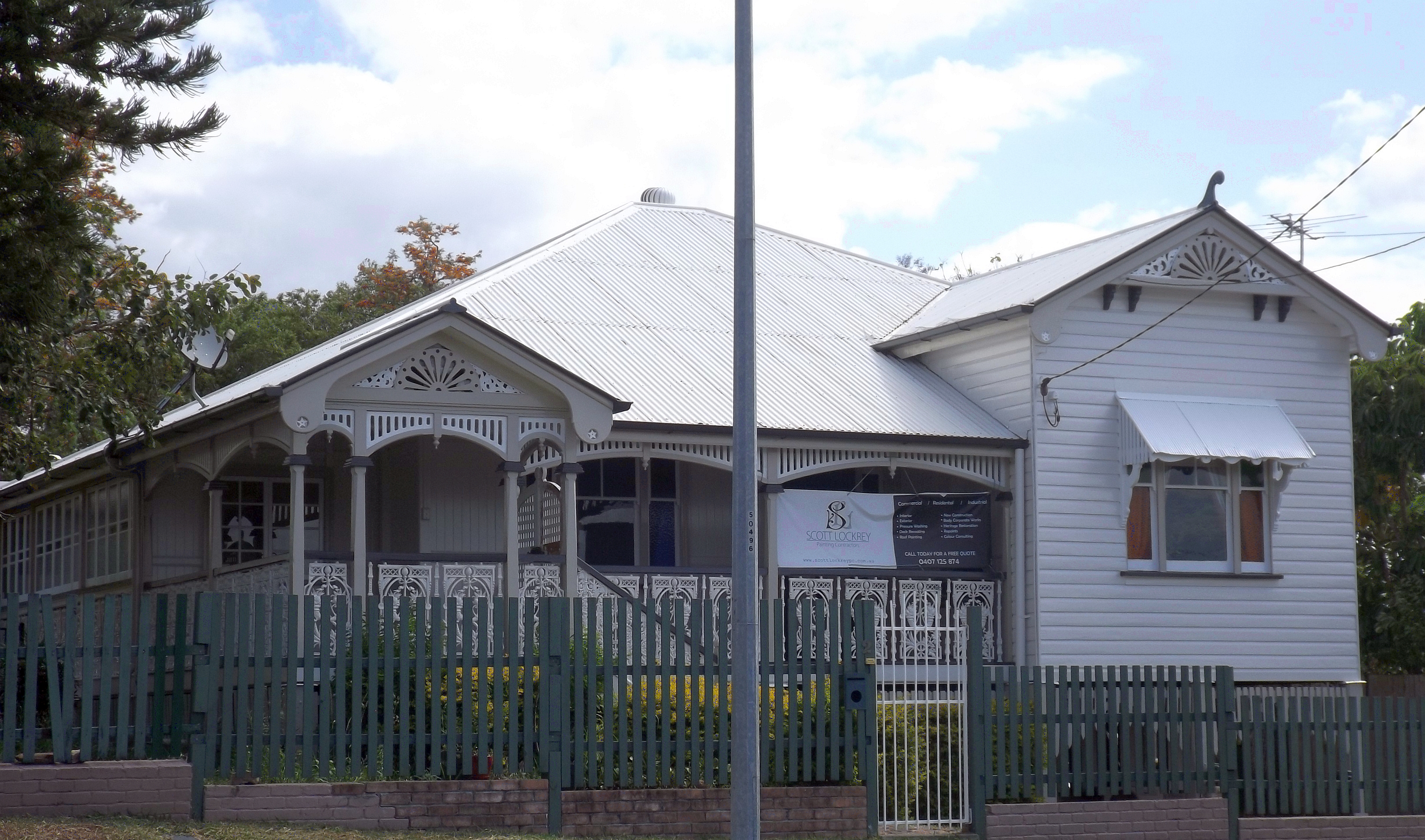
House viewed from across street, 2015

Idavine is located on a compact lot facing Burnett Street to its north-east. It sits atop a hill approximately 1 kilometre (0.62 mi) from the Ipswich town center. The house is situated approximately 3 metres (9.8 ft) from the front fence line at its narrowest point and 4.5 metres (15 ft) at its widest. The eastern face of the building is approximately 3 metres (9.8 ft) from the side boundary, and the western face is approximately 4 metres (13 ft) from the boundary at the narrowest point. The front verandah provides the visitor with an uninterrupted vista along Limestone Street, the approach route from the town centre.

The house is timber-framed and externally clad on its exposed faces in chamferboards. All its original timber stumps have been replaced with concrete ones. While the timber floor framing appeared to be in good condition, it was noted that a number of steel bearers had been introduced. Painted timber battens screen the gaps between each exterior concrete stump. The building has two gable projections on the front facade. The smaller of the two sits above the verandah, while the other incorporates a triple window. The main roof is short-ridged and slopes continuously to the edge of the verandah. Where the kitchen abuts the dining room, the main roof is joined to another short-ridged roof sloping at right angles to it. The entire roof is of corrugated galvanized iron with recently installed vents in each ridge.

The bargeboards to the verandah gable are shaped and rounded at each end, with a star pattern cut out from the resulting panel of timber. The triangular gable infill is made of decorated timber. A similarly ornate infill panel adorns the other larger gable. It projects approximately 30 centimetres (12 in) from the wall below and is supported by carved timber brackets. A double set is located either side of the triple window below. A finial projects from the gable's ridge.

Entry to the verandah is gained via stairs at right angles to the gable projection and through a set of double lattice doors. Its open edge is decorated with tapering, chamfered timber posts. Between each post is an arched frieze panel in-filled with timber battens and divided by a carved timber drop. The ends of the arched friezes rest on timber capitals. The open edge is also decorated with cast iron baluster panels and balusters beneath a timber handrail. The panels display a cornucopia design motif featuring two horns, one filled with fruit and the other with vegetables. Below the symmetrically curved horns are bunches of wheat and another plant. Located centrally at the bottom of the panel, where the ends of each bunch cross, is a horseshoe. The balustrading pattern matches one registered in Victoria on 7 April 1892 by J Cochrane & G Scott.

The combined effect of the cast iron balustrading and the decorative timberwork to the verandah is to give the house a strong street presence. This is despite the fact that these elements are hidden somewhat by foliage. The cast iron balustrading and handrail continues for almost the entire length of the eastern face of the house; however part of the verandah is enclosed with windows.

The framing is exposed on the exterior face of the building adjoining the verandah. This wall is single skin, vertically jointed tongue and groove boarding. Exposed framing is found elsewhere facing the kitchen and sleep-out areas. A tripartite, double-hung sash window opens from the verandah into the current living room. A casement window opens between the sleep-out and verandah. The front door, consisting of one side panel and a pivoting glass fanlight, also opens off the verandah. Next to the front door is fixed a timber plaque on which the name "Idavine" is painted in gold. It was in place when the current owners took possession of the property in 2001.

The front door opens onto a hall with an approximately 3.5-metre (11 ft) high ceiling. The ceilings in all rooms, except the kitchen, laundry and sleep-out (enclosed verandah), are this height. The hall is divided in two by an arched doorway, on either side of which are fixed glass panels. The walls are lined with vertically jointed tongue and groove boarding, as are all other walls in the house. In the hall are located the only skirting boards to be found in the house. The floor is polished timber boarding, as are all others excluding those in the bathroom, ensuite, kitchen and laundry. The ceilings in both segments of the hallway are pressed metal, as are the cornices. There are further pressed metal ceilings in the living room, kitchen and main bedroom. All other ceilings, excluding those in the sleep-out and verandah, which are sheeted, are lined with vertically jointed tongue and groove boarding.

Six rooms open off the hallway, two to the left, three to the right and one to the rear. Above each doorway (all fitted with timber doors) is a decorated frieze panel, except above the rear door where there is a pivoted fanlight. The rooms to the left are the current living and dining rooms, which are joined by a large, rectangular shaped opening. Its shape and the difference in ceiling finishes in each room suggest that this was an amendment to the original plan. Both rooms have doorways onto the sleep-out that feature frieze panels. The living room's pressed metal ceiling incorporates a border and concave cornice. In the centre is located a single square featuring a cherub. In the rear wall of the dining room there is an unusual shaped opening. Above a long rectangular servery is centered a square fixed glass panel. This panel's head height matches those of the doors, as does its width. Therefore, it could have been a door at some point. The framing for the hallway walls is exposed in the rooms opening off it.

The majority of rooms with windows opening through the western and southern facades of the house have skillion hoods. Those that do not are sheltered by the overhang of the ensuite's skillion roof. The hoods feature flat, galvanized iron roofs, timber battens to each side and carved timber brackets. All windows are double-hung sashes, except three opening off the ensuite, which are casement.

The last room to open to the right off the hallway has a picture rail fixed at a height of approximately 3 metres (9.8 ft). In its western wall a door opens into an ensuite. This was built after an application was made by the current owners to the Heritage Branch in November 2001. The ensuite fills in what had been a small entry verandah accessed by a short flight of stairs. The stairs remain, as does the lattice door that once opened into the verandah. One of the ensuite's three casement windows has been covered, although it is visible on the exterior. The door between the bedroom and ensuite has a fixed glass panel above and a timber threshold.

In plan, the kitchen is L-shaped and one enters from the hallway at its corner. Three more rooms open off this space. The first is currently (2003) a main bedroom, the second is the main bathroom, and the third room is a small laundry. A bank of timber, casement windows line the external wall of the kitchen, and open onto a patio, which is recent and roofed with clear PVC sheeting. Both doors accessing these rooms from the kitchen have timber thresholds. The main bathroom has a tiled floor from the later part of the twentieth century. Its walls are lined with vertically jointed tongue and groove, and pine boarding divided by a picture rail at door head height. The bedroom's only window is divided into three parts.

The ceiling to the kitchen slopes to match that found in the sleep-out and verandah areas. In the south-west corner of the house, where the kitchen opens into the sleep-out, there are two windows. One is fixed glass and visible on the rear facade. The other window can only be seen from inside the toilet, which has been added to the building, possibly when it was used as flats. Taking the evidence of the slope in the ceilings and the location of timber thresholds, fixed glass panels above doors, and exposed framing, it is likely that the kitchen space was open at some point.

=== Grounds ===
The front fence consists of painted timber frame and palings atop a low, stepped brick wall. The pedestrian and driveway entry gates are made of white, painted tubular steel. A brick pathway leads from the pedestrian gate to the entry stairs. A large palm tree shelters part of the front facade, extending the height of the house's western gable end. There is some small to medium size shrubbery situated within the zone of the front setback.

When moving around the exterior of the house, it becomes clear that a number of level changes occur on the lot. In general terms, a continuous step divides the eastern and western sides of the lot. The western area is flat and allows cars to be driven along the driveway and under the rear of the house. A step of approximately 1.5 metres (4 ft 11 in) runs perpendicular from the rear boundary and meets the underside of the house where the patio has been attached. It moves underneath the house and the difference in level is dissipated toward the front boundary. The eastern half of the yard is also largely flat. Adjoining the verandah are three established trees and some low planting. A large brick BBQ sits against the eastern fence at the point where the patio stairs empty out.

== Heritage listing ==
Idavine was listed on the Queensland Heritage Register on 21 October 1992 having satisfied the following criteria.

The place is important in demonstrating the evolution or pattern of Queensland's history.

Idavine at 2 Burnett Street is important in demonstrating the evolution or pattern of Queensland's history and is important in demonstrating the principal characteristics of a particular class of cultural places insofar as it is a representative example of Federation-style residential architecture in a precinct of Ipswich containing historically significant timber and brick houses. Its long association with German owners from 1886 onwards is also indicative of the influential presence of German emigrants in Queensland following the well-planned immigration scheme established in Germany during the late 19th century.

The place is important in demonstrating the principal characteristics of a particular class of cultural places.

Idavine at 2 Burnett Street is important in demonstrating the evolution or pattern of Queensland's history and is important in demonstrating the principal characteristics of a particular class of cultural places insofar as it is a representative example of Federation-style residential architecture in a precinct of Ipswich containing historically significant timber and brick houses.

The place is important because of its aesthetic significance.

It is also important because of its aesthetic significance, which contributes to the overall historical character of the Burnett Street precinct. As a whole, the streetscape of Ipswich abounds with significant examples of early Queensland housing and architecture and this residence remains an important and well-preserved example of Federation housing in the area. Its well-maintained state also gives it individual aesthetic value, with many of its original internal and external features intact.
