= 2022–23 Melbourne Renegades season =

Australian domestic cricket team

Melbourne Renegades
2022–23 season
- Coach: David Saker
- Captain(s): Nic Maddinson
- Home ground: Marvel Stadium; GMHBA Stadium
- BBL season: 3rd
- BBL finals: Knockout
- Leading Run Scorer: Aaron Finch (428)
- Leading Wicket Taker: Tom Rogers (23)
- Player of the Season: Aaron Finch
- Highest home attendance: 22,437 vs. Melbourne Stars at Marvel Stadium (14 January 2023)
- Lowest home attendance: 6,892 vs. Brisbane Heat at GMHBA Stadium (21 December 2022)
- Average home attendance: 11,809

The 2022–23 Melbourne Renegades season will be the twelfth in the club's history. Coached by David Saker and captained by Nic Maddinson, they competed in the BBL's 2022–23 season.

== Squad information ==
=== Playing squad ===
The current squad of the Melbourne Renegades for the 2022–23 Big Bash League season as of 16 January 2023.

- Players with international caps are listed in **bold**.
- * denotes a player who is currently unavailable for selection.
- * denotes a player who is unavailable for rest of the season.

| No. | Name | Nat. | Date of birth | Batting style | Bowling style | Notes |
Batsmen
| 5 | **Aaron Finch** | Australia | 17 November 1986 (age 39) | Right-handed | Slow left arm orthodox | Vice captain |
| 31 | **Martin Guptill** | New Zealand | 30 September 1986 (age 39) | Right-handed | Right-arm off break | Visa contract, replacement player for Andre Russell |
| 23 | Jake Fraser-McGurk | Australia | 11 April 2002 (age 24) | Right-handed | Right arm leg break | |
| 14 | **Marcus Harris** | Australia | 21 July 1992 (age 33) | Left-handed | Right arm off break | |
| 3 | Mackenzie Harvey | Australia | 18 September 2000 (age 25) | Left-handed | Right arm medium-fast | |
| 53 | **Nic Maddinson** | Australia | 21 December 1991 (age 34) | Left-handed | Left-arm orthodox | Captain |
| 9 | **Shaun Marsh** | Australia | 9 July 1983 (age 43) | Left-handed | Slow left arm orthodox | |
| 29 | Jonathan Wells | Australia | 13 August 1988 (age 37) | Right-handed | Right-arm medium | |
All-rounders
| 20 | Matt Critchley | England | 13 August 1996 (age 29) | Right-handed | Right-arm leg break | Visa contract, replacement player for Akeal Hosein |
| – | **Liam Livingstone** | England | 4 August 1993 (age 32) | Right-handed | Right-arm off break | Visa contract |
| 121 | **Andre Russell** | West Indies | 29 April 1988 (age 38) | Right-handed | Right-arm fast-medium | Visa contract, replacement player for Liam Livingstone |
| 12 | Will Sutherland | Australia | 27 October 1999 (age 26) | Right-handed | Right arm fast medium | |
Wicketkeepers
| 54 | **Peter Handscomb** | Australia | 26 December 1994 (age 31) | Right-handed | Right-arm off break | |
| 6 | Sam Harper | Australia | 10 December 1996 (age 29) | Right-handed | – | |
Pace bowlers
| 2 | Zak Evans | Australia | 26 March 2000 (age 26) | Right-handed | Right-arm fast | |
| 15 | David Moody | Australia | 28 April 1995 (age 31) | Right-handed | Right-arm fast-medium | Injury replacement player for Zak Evans |
| 61 | Jack Prestwidge | Australia | 28 February 1996 (age 30) | Right-handed | Right-arm medium fast | |
| 55 | **Kane Richardson** | Australia | 12 February 1991 (age 35) | Right-handed | Right arm fast medium | |
| 8 | Tom Rogers | Australia | 3 March 1994 (age 32) | Left-handed | Right arm fast-medium | |
Spin bowlers
| 52 | **Fawad Ahmed** | Australia | 5 February 1982 (age 44) | Right-handed | Right arm leg spin | Injury replacement player for Shaun Marsh |
| 7 | **Akeal Hosein** | West Indies | 25 April 1993 (age 33) | Left-handed | Left-arm orthodox | Visa contract |
| 4 | Ruwantha Kellepotha | Sri Lanka | 13 July 1991 (age 35) | Right-handed | Right-arm leg-spin | Visa contract, replacement player for Mujeeb Ur Rahman |
| 77 | Corey Rocchiccioli | Australia | 8 October 1997 (age 28) | Right-handed | Right-arm off break | |
| 88 | **Mujeeb Ur Rahman** | Afghanistan | 28 March 2001 (age 25) | Right-handed | Right-arm off break | Visa contract |

=== Administration and support staff ===
The current administration and support staff of the Melbourne Renegades for the 2022–23 Big Bash League season as of 6 December 2022.

| Position | Name |
|---|---|
| Head coach | David Saker |
| Assistant coach | Brad Hodge |
| Assistant coach | Lloyd Mash |
| Strength & conditioning Coach | Richard Johnson |
| Physiotherapist | Nick Adcock |
Source:Renegades staff

== Pre-season ==
13 August 2022
Summary

| Melbourne Renegades Academy; 7/158 (20 overs) | v | Melbourne Stars Academy; 5/159 (19.4 overs) |

Melbourne Stars Academy won by 5 wickets
DXC Arena, Darwin

15 August 2022
Summary

| Melbourne Renegades Academy; 108 (17.4 overs) | v | Cricket Australia XI; 4/109 (18.3 overs) |

Cricket Australia XI won by 6 wickets
DXC Arena, Darwin

17 August 2022
Summary

| Melbourne Renegades Academy; 8/160 (20 overs) | v | Northern Territory; 5/147 (20 overs) |

Melbourne Renegades Academy won by 13 runs
DXC Arena, Darwin

20 August 2022
Summary

| Papua New Guinea; 6/152 (20 overs) | v | Melbourne Renegades Academy; 5/155 (16.2 overs) |

Melbourne Renegades Academy won by 5 wickets
DXC Arena, Darwin

5 October 2022

| Melbourne Renegades Academy | v | Scotland |

No result
HP Barr Reserve, Wangaratta

6 October 2022

| Melbourne Renegades Academy | v | Namibia |

No result
HP Barr Reserve, Wangaratta

9 December 2022
Scorecard

| Melbourne Stars; 7/220 (20 overs) | v | Melbourne Renegades; 2/221 (18.5 overs) |

Melbourne Renegades won by 8 wickets
CitiPower Centre, Melbourne

11 December 2022
Scorecard

| Melbourne Renegades Academy; 4/155 (20 overs) | v | Melbourne Stars Academy |

No result
Chirnside Park, Melbourne

== Regular season ==
=== League table ===
| Pos | Team | Pld | W | L | NR | Pts | NRR | Qualification |
|---|---|---|---|---|---|---|---|---|
| 1 | Perth Scorchers (C) | 14 | 11 | 3 | 0 | 22 | 1.205 | Advanced to play-off phase |
| 2 | Sydney Sixers | 14 | 10 | 3 | 1 | 21 | 0.846 | Advanced to play-off phase |
| 3 | Melbourne Renegades | 14 | 7 | 7 | 0 | 14 | −0.027 | Advanced to play-off phase |
| 4 | Sydney Thunder | 14 | 7 | 7 | 0 | 14 | −0.716 | Advanced to play-off phase |
| 5 | Brisbane Heat | 14 | 6 | 7 | 1 | 13 | −0.483 | Advanced to play-off phase |
| 6 | Hobart Hurricanes | 14 | 6 | 8 | 0 | 12 | −0.340 | |
| 7 | Adelaide Strikers | 14 | 5 | 9 | 0 | 10 | −0.151 | |
| 8 | Melbourne Stars | 14 | 3 | 11 | 0 | 6 | −0.287 | |

Source: ESPNcricinfo
(C) Champions

=== Result by round ===
| Round | 1 | 2 | 3 | 4 | 5 | 6 | 7 | 8 | 9 | 10 | 11 | 12 | 13 | 14 |
|---|---|---|---|---|---|---|---|---|---|---|---|---|---|---|
| Ground | A | H | H | A | A | H | H | A | H | A | H | A | A | H |
| Result | W | W | W | L | L | L | L | W | W | L | W | L | L | W |
| Position | 2 | 2 | 2 | 2 | | | 5 | 3 | 4 | 5 | 3 | 3 | 4 | 3 |

Updated to match(es) played on 23 January 2023. Source: Big Bash League
A = Away; H = Home; W = Win; L = Loss; NR = No result

=== Matches ===
Match 3
15 December 2022
18:15 (N)
Scorecard

| Melbourne Renegades; 7/166 (20 overs) | v | Brisbane Heat (H); 6/144 (20 overs) |
| Nic Maddinson 87 (49); Matthew Kuhnemann 3/32 (4 overs) | | Jimmy Peirson 43 (30); Akeal Hosein 3/15 (4 overs) |

Melbourne Renegades won by 22 runs
Cazalys Stadium, Cairns
Attendance: 6,708
Umpires: Phillip Gillespie and Donovan Koch
Player of the match: Nic Maddinson (Melbourne Renegades)

- Brisbane Heat won the toss and elected to field.
- Josh Brown (Brisbane Heat) made his T20 debut.

Match 7
18 December 2022
19:15 (N)
Scorecard

| Sydney Thunder; 6/174 (20 overs) | v | Melbourne Renegades (H); 6/175 (19.5 overs) |
| Rilee Rossouw 53 (38); Tom Rogers 2/41 (4 overs) | | Aaron Finch 70* (43); Daniel Sams 3/33 (4 overs) |

Melbourne Renegades won by 4 wickets
Docklands Stadium, Melbourne
Attendance: 7,087
Umpires: Sam Nogajski and Ben Treloar
Player of the match: Aaron Finch (Melbourne Renegades)

- Sydney Thunder won the toss and elected to bat.

Match 10
21 December 2022
19:15 (N)
Scorecard

| Brisbane Heat; 8/137 (20 overs) | v | Melbourne Renegades (H); 6/139 (19.2 overs) |
| Jimmy Peirson 45* (30); Tom Rogers 4/23 (4 overs) | | Andre Russell 57 (42); Michael Neser 4/32 (4 overs) |

Melbourne Renegades won by 4 wickets
Kardinia Park, Geelong
Attendance: 6,892
Umpires: Simon Lightbody and David Taylor
Player of the match: Andre Russell (Melbourne Renegades)

- Brisbane Heat won the toss and elected to bat.
- Michael Neser (Brisbane Heat) took the 9th BBL hat-trick.

Match 14
24 December 2022
15:30 (D/N)
Scorecard

| (H) Hobart Hurricanes; 122 (18 overs) | v | Melbourne Renegades; 114 (19.2 overs) |
| James Neesham 28 (19); David Moody 3/16 (4 overs) | | Will Sutherland 40 (29); Riley Meredith 3/12 (4 overs) |

Hobart Hurricanes won by 8 runs
Bellerive Oval, Hobart
Attendance: 9,128
Umpires: Shawn Craig and Sam Nogajski
Player of the match: Riley Meredith (Hobart Hurricanes)

- Hobart Hurricanes won the toss and elected to bat.

Match 18
28 December 2022
19:15 (N)
Scorecard

| (H) Sydney Sixers; 8/149 (20 overs) | v | Melbourne Renegades; 115 (19 overs) |
| Josh Philippe 55 (40); Mujeeb Ur Rahman 3/29 (4 overs) | | Aaron Finch 36 (35); Ben Dwarshuis 4/17 (4 overs) |

Sydney Sixers won by 34 runs
Sydney Cricket Ground, Sydney
Attendance: 16,208
Umpires: Sharad Patel and Paul Wilson
Player of the match: Ben Dwarshuis (Sydney Sixers)

- Melbourne Renegades won the toss and elected to field.

Match 21
30 December 2022
18:30 (N)
Scorecard

| (H) Melbourne Renegades; 7/124 (20 overs) | v | Sydney Sixers; 4/126 (17.5 overs) |
| Shaun Marsh 35 (29); Chris Jordan 2/25 (4 overs); Hayden Kerr 2/25 (4 overs) | | James Vince 39 (31); Akeal Hosein 2/24 (4 overs) |

Sydney Sixers won by 6 wickets
Kardinia Park, Geelong
Attendance: 12,336
Umpires: Gerard Abood and Stephen Dionysius
Player of the match: Chris Jordan (Sydney Sixers)

- Melbourne Renegades won the toss and elected to bat.

Match 24
1 January 2023
13:40 (D/N)
Scorecard

| (H) Melbourne Renegades; 6/155 (20 overs) | v | Perth Scorchers; 5/156 (19.4 overs) |
| Aaron Finch 65 (48); Andrew Tye 3/32 (4 overs) | | Josh Inglis 47 (34); Kane Richardson 2/21 (4 overs) |

Perth Scorchers won by 5 wickets
Docklands Stadium, Melbourne
Attendance: 9,027
Umpires: Bruce Oxenford and Shawn Craig
Player of the match: Josh Inglis (Perth Scorchers)

- Melbourne Renegades won the toss and elected to bat.

Match 27
3 January 2023
19:15 (N)
Scorecard

| Melbourne Renegades; 7/141 (20 overs) | v | Melbourne Stars (H); 9/108 (20 overs) |
| Mackenzie Harvey 32* (23); Trent Boult 2/23 (4 overs) | | Nick Larkin 48* (40); Tom Rogers 5/16 (4 overs) |

Melbourne Renegades won by 33 runs
Melbourne Cricket Ground, Melbourne
Attendance: 38,564
Umpires: Gerard Abood and Phillip Gillespie
Player of the match: Tom Rogers (Melbourne Renegades)

- Melbourne Stars won the toss and elected to field.

Match 32
7 January 2023
18:05 (N)
Scorecard

| Hobart Hurricanes; 8/162 (20 overs) | v | Melbourne Renegades (H); 4/164 (18.1 overs) |
| Caleb Jewell 28 (17); Kane Richardson 2/20 (4 overs) | | Sam Harper 89 (48); Nathan Ellis 1/17 (3.1 overs) |

Melbourne Renegades won by 6 wickets
Docklands Stadium, Melbourne
Attendance: 12,514
Umpires: Gerard Abood and Nathan Johnstone
Player of the match: Sam Harper (Melbourne Renegades)

- Melbourne Renegades won the toss and elected to field.

Match 36
10 January 2023
19:10 (N)
Scorecard

| (H) Adelaide Strikers; 4/202 (20 overs) | v | Melbourne Renegades; 6/182 (20 overs) |
| Chris Lynn 69* (37); Ruwantha Kellepotha 2/32 (4 overs) | | Sam Harper 63 (36); Matt Short 2/26 (4 overs); Wes Agar 2/26 (4 overs) |

Adelaide Strikers won by 20 runs
Adelaide Oval, Adelaide
Attendance: 21,345
Umpires: Claire Polosak and Shawn Craig
Player of the match: Chris Lynn (Adelaide Strikers)

- Melbourne Renegades won the toss and elected to field
- Ruwantha Kellepotha (Melbourne Renegades) made his T20 debut.

Match 41
14 January 2023
19:30 (N)
Scorecard

| (H) Melbourne Renegades; 7/162 (20 overs) | v | Melbourne Stars; 7/156 (20 overs) |
| Sam Harper 51 (36); Liam Hatcher 2/34 (4 overs) | | Joe Clarke 59 (37); Kane Richardson 2/17 (4 overs) |

Melbourne Renegades won by 6 runs
Docklands Stadium, Melbourne
Attendance: 22,437
Umpires: Greg Davidson and Michael Graham-Smith
Player of the match: Kane Richardson (Melbourne Renegades)

- Melbourne Stars won the toss and elected to field.

Match 47
19 January 2023
19:15 (N)
Scorecard

| Melbourne Renegades; 9/142 (20 overs) | v | Sydney Thunder (H); 2/144 (18.3 overs) |
| Will Sutherland 42* (23); Usman Qadir 2/20 (4 overs) | | Matthew Gilkes 74* (55); Corey Rocchiccioli 2/25 (4 overs) |

Sydney Thunder won by 8 wickets
Manuka Oval, Canberra
Attendance: 10,862
Umpires: David Taylor and Paul Wilson
Player of the match: Matthew Gilkes (Sydney Thunder)

- Melbourne Renegades won the toss and elected to bat.

Match 52
22 January 2023
16:15 (N)
Scorecard

| (H) Perth Scorchers; 5/212 (20 overs) | v | Melbourne Renegades; 5/202 (20 overs) |
| Cameron Bancroft 95* (50); Matt Critchley 2/34 (4 overs) | | Aaron Finch 76* (35); Ashton Turner 2/25 (3 overs) |

Perth Scorchers won by 10 runs
Perth Stadium, Perth
Attendance: 32,259
Umpires: Donovan Koch and Paul Wilson
Player of the match: Cameron Bancroft (Perth Scorchers)

- Melbourne Renegades won the toss and elected to field.

Match 54
24 January 2023
19:15 (N)
Scorecard

| Adelaide Strikers; 7/142 (20 overs) | v | Melbourne Renegades (H); 4/143 (18.2 overs) |
| Alex Carey 65 (47); Fawad Ahmed 3/17 (4 overs) | | Aaron Finch 63* (54); Peter Siddle 1/24 (3.2 overs) |

Melbourne Renegades won by 6 wickets
Docklands Stadium, Melbourne
Attendance: 13,477
Umpires: Ben Treloar and Phillip Gillespie
Player of the match: Aaron Finch (Melbourne Renegades)

- Melbourne Renegades won the toss and elected to field.

== Play-offs ==
=== Bracket ===
Eliminator
4 | Sydney Thunder | 1/52 (6.5 overs)
5 | Brisbane Heat | 5/203 (20 overs)

Qualifier
1 | Perth Scorchers | 3/154 (18.3 overs)
2 | Sydney Sixers | 8/151 (20 overs)
Knockout
3 | Melbourne Renegades | 5/162 (20 overs)
5 | Brisbane Heat | 3/164 (18.5 overs)

Challenger
2 | Sydney Sixers | 9/116 (20 overs)
5 | Brisbane Heat | 6/117 (18.2 overs)

Final
1 | Perth Scorchers | 5/178 (19.2 overs)
5 | Brisbane Heat | 7/175 (20 overs)

=== Matches ===
Knockout
29 January 2023
19:15 (N)
Scorecard

| Melbourne Renegades; 5/162 (20 overs) | v | Brisbane Heat; 3/164 (18.5 overs) |
| Shaun Marsh 82* (53); Xavier Bartlett 3/18 (4 overs) | | Usman Khawaja 59 (47); Tom Rogers 2/33 (3.5 overs) |

Brisbane Heat won by 7 wickets
Docklands Stadium, Melbourne
Attendance: 10,699
Umpires: Bruce Oxenford and Phillip Gillespie
Player of the match: Xavier Bartlett (Brisbane Heat)

- Brisbane Heat won the toss and elected to field.

== Season statistics ==
=== Attendances ===
| Match No. | Teams | Date | Venue | Location | Attendance | Capacity % (Note: Based on general venue capacity, which will vary depending on cricket capacity.) |
|---|---|---|---|---|---|---|
| 3 | Brisbane Heat vs Melbourne Renegades | 15 December 2022 | Cazalys Stadium | Cairns | 6,708 | 50% |
| 7 | Melbourne Renegades vs Sydney Thunder | 18 December 2022 | Docklands Stadium | Melbourne | 7,087 | 13% |
| 10 | Melbourne Renegades vs Brisbane Heat | 21 December 2022 | Kardinia Park | Geelong | 6,892 | 19% |
| 14 | Hobart Hurricanes vs Melbourne Renegades | 24 December 2022 | Bellerive Oval | Hobart | 9,128 | 46% |
| 18 | Sydney Sixers vs Melbourne Renegades | 28 December 2022 | Sydney Cricket Ground | Sydney | 16,208 | 34% |
| 21 | Melbourne Renegades vs Sydney Sixers | 30 December 2022 | Kardinia Park | Geelong | 12,336 | 34% |
| 24 | Melbourne Renegades vs Perth Scorchers | 1 January 2023 | Docklands Stadium | Melbourne | 9,027 | 16% |
| 27 | Melbourne Stars vs Melbourne Renegades | 3 January 2023 | Melbourne Cricket Ground | Melbourne | 38,564 | 39% |
| 32 | Melbourne Renegades vs Hobart Hurricanes | 7 January 2023 | Docklands Stadium | Melbourne | 12,514 | 23% |
| 36 | Adelaide Strikers vs Melbourne Renegades | 10 January 2023 | Adelaide Oval | Adelaide | 21,345 | 40% |
| 41 | Melbourne Renegades vs Melbourne Stars | 14 January 2023 | Docklands Stadium | Melbourne | 22,437 | 40% |
| 47 | Sydney Thunder vs Melbourne Renegades | 19 January 2023 | Manuka Oval | Canberra | 10,862 | 68% |
| 52 | Perth Scorchers vs Melbourne Renegades | 22 January 2023 | Perth Stadium | Perth | 32,259 | 53% |
| 54 | Melbourne Renegades vs Adelaide Strikers | 24 January 2023 | Docklands Stadium | Melbourne | 13,477 | 24% |
| K | Melbourne Renegades vs Brisbane Heat | 29 January 2023 | Docklands Stadium | Melbourne | 10,699 | 19% |
| Home Average | | | | | 11,809 | 24% |
| Home Total | | | | | 94,469 | — |
| Overall Average | | | | | 15,303 | 35% |
| Overall Total | | | | | 229,543 | — |

- denotes home matches.
