= Myf =

Myf or MYF may refer to:

Myf also an internet slang which means "My fault".

== People ==
- A nickname for people named Myfanwy
- Myf Shepherd (born 1991), Australian fashion model
- Myf Warhurst (born 1974), Australian radio announcer and television personality

== Other uses ==
- Montgomery Field, a public airport in San Diego, United States (IATA airport code)
- Bambassi language, an Omotic language spoken in Ethiopia

== See also ==
- MYF5, protein
