= Arthur Poister =

- Born: Arthur William Poister; June 13, 1898
- Died: February 25, 1980 (aged 81) Durham, North Carolina, United States
- Genres: Classical
- Occupation: Organist
- Instrument: Organ

Arthur William Poister (June 13, 1898 – February 25, 1980) was an eminent American organist, who was especially renowned as one of the country's leading pedagogues of future generations of musicians.

Arthur Poister served as music director at Syracuse University's Hendricks Chapel from 1948 to 1965, and as organ professor from 1948 to 1967. Decades earlier, he taught for nearly twenty years at the Oberlin Conservatory of Music, where a large number of famous organists studied with him during their collegiate years. He was also a professor at the University of Redlands around the year 1933. Later in the 1930s, he taught at the University of Minnesota.

Poister was at Oberlin until 1948, when he moved to Syracuse University. The move was facilitated in part by the building of several new organs at Syracuse, including a pair of concert instruments and several practice organs. He also had shorter teaching stints at the University of Colorado, Longwood College in Farmville, Virginia and Meredith College in Raleigh, North Carolina. The Arthur Poister Organ Competition was created in his honor in 1976, and is one of the leading competitions of its kind in America.

Poister's past students have included Fenner Douglas, David Boe, Roger Nyquist, Elizabeth, Raymond Chenault, Carlo Curley, Judith Hancock, Donald Sutherland, David N. Johnson, David Hurd, Roberta Gary, Leonard Raver, Carl B. Staplin, and Chris Yorks.

Arthur Poister died in Durham, North Carolina at the age of 81. During his final years, he had been living in Raleigh. He was survived by his wife Dorothy, daughter Wendy, son Theodore, five grandchildren, and four great-grandchildren.
