= Sheila Lawrence =

- Born: Sheila Ann Lawrence; 12 December 1945; Ootakamund, Tamil Nadu State, India
- Died: 25 February 1990 (aged 44) Esher, Surrey, England
- Genres: Classical
- Occupation: Musician
- Instrument: Organ

Sheila Ann Lawrence (December 12, 1945 – February 25, 1990) was a concert organist who performed throughout the UK and broadcast frequently on BBC Radio 3.

== Life and career ==
Sheila Lawrence was born in Ootakamund, India in December 1945 to Edward Lawrence and Helena Campbell. Her father was a mercantile assistant and travelled widely. She studied at the Royal Academy of Music in London and made her debut at the Purcell Room, London on 13 December 1973. Lawrence performed at the Purcell Room throughout her career.

In April 1978, Lawrence appeared at the Wigmore Hall, London with Elisabeth Perry (violin), Christian Rutherford (French horn) and Jonathan Rutherford (piano) in a programme of Bach-Rutherford, Jonathon Rutherford, Mozart, Bach and Brahms. Sheila Lawrence was married to Peter Mitton and had three children. She died in 1990 at the age of 44.

== Organ building ==
Lawrence was a member of the Incorporated Society of Organ Builders with a special interest in organ reform, and had built a portable chamber organ. The portable organ was built from her design by Peter Collins, and was a portable concert pipe organ. It was played by Lawrence in October 1980 at the Royal Albert Hall in an organ concert which featured Carlo Curley, Noel Rawsthorne and William Davies. It was again played by her in the Albert Hall in April 1982, at an event called 'The Organists Entertain', directed by the organ virtuoso Carlo Curley. Also performing at the event were Pierre Cochereau, Robin Richmond and Lyn Larsen.

== Recitals and performances ==
She broadcast on BBC Radio 3 frequently during the 1970s and 1980s and was the Director of Music at the Servite Priory in Chelsea, London. In 1983, to mark the 750th anniversary of the founding of the Servite Order, Lawrence released an LP, on the Meridian Label, of Organ Music from the Servite Priory, entitled 'Magnificat'. It featured works by Buxtehude, A. Schlick, J.S. Bach, N. Bruhns, S. Scheidt, J. Bull and F. Correa de Arauxo. The album was featured on BBC Radio 3's New Records programme, broadcast in March 1984.

Some of her notable recitals, recorded and broadcast for BBC Radio 3, include: Music for Two Organs, with the organist Robert Munns (July 1975); Organ works by Clerambault, J.S. Bach and Mendelssohn (June 1977); A performance of works by renaissance composers Jean Titelouze, Paul Hofhaimer, Arnolt Schlick and Peeter Cornet with the BBC Singers, conducted by Simon Joly (April 1985).

Lawrence also broadcast for BBC Radio 4, playing for the Morning Service in April 1984. In February 1989 she played organ and virginals on BBC Radio 4's Saturday Feature, which explored the diary of the Elizabethan organ-builder Thomas Dallam.

As well as performing around the UK, Lawrence gave recitals in Germany, Denmark, the Netherlands and Italy. She was a founding member of the British Organ Archive, the archive of the British Institute of Organ Studies. In 1982 she wrote an article entitled Technique - a key to interpretation in the Journal of the British Institute of Organ Studies.
