= Josie Dooley =

Australian cricketer (born 2000)

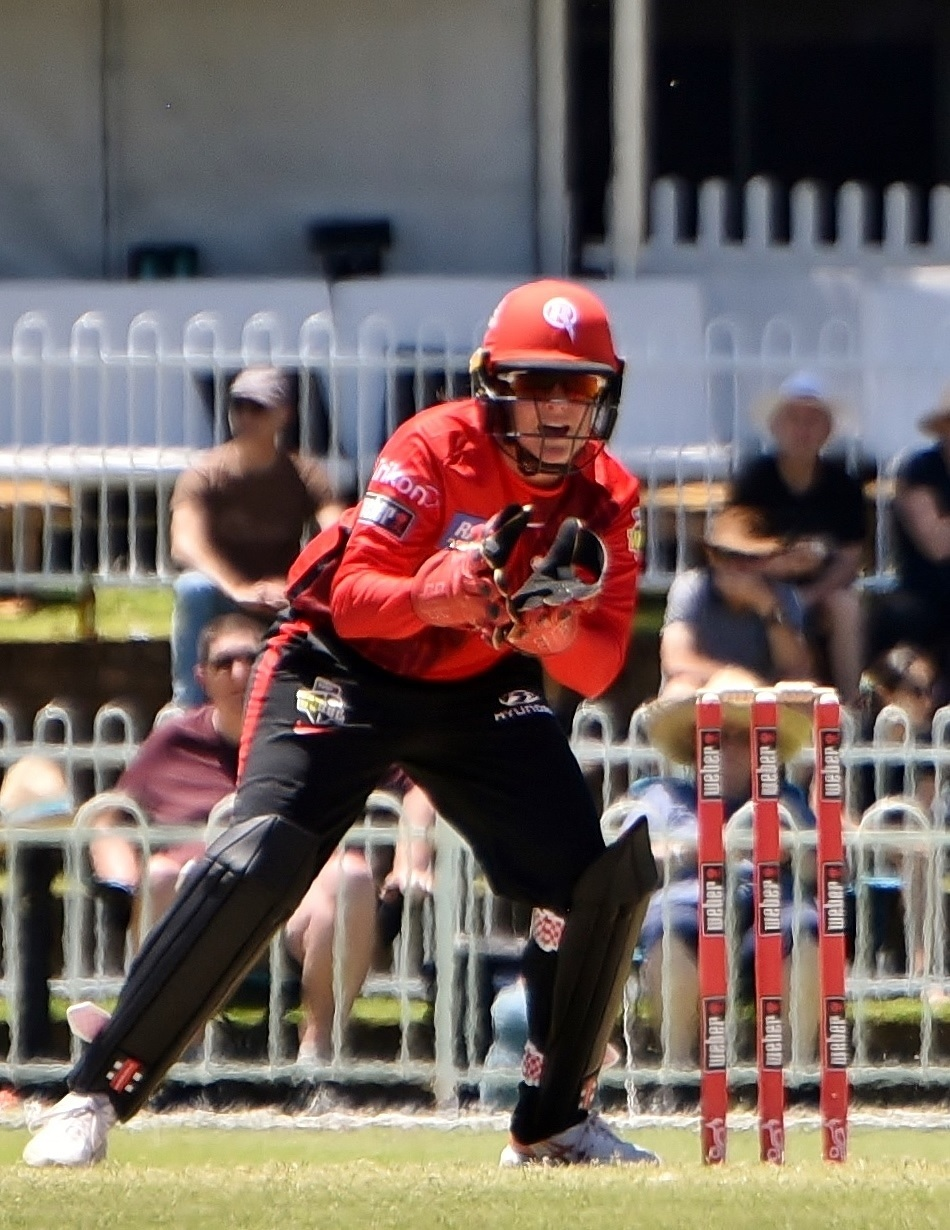
- Dooley wicket-keeping for the Melbourne Renegades during a WBBL|07 match

Personal information
- Full name: Josephine Erin Dooley
- Born: 21 January 2000 (age 26); Brisbane, Queensland, Australia
- Batting: Right-handed
- Role: Wicket-keeper
- Relatives: Patrick Dooley (brother)

Domestic team information
- Years: Team
- 2017/18–2019/20: Queensland
- 2018/19: Brisbane Heat
- 2019/20–present: Melbourne Renegades
- 2020/21–present: South Australia

Career statistics
Competition	WLA	WT20
Matches	53	80
Runs scored	1,461	885
Batting average	33.13	18.97
100s/50s	1/11	0/2
Top score	116	54
Catches/stumpings	28/12	35/14
- Source: CricketArchive, 26 October 2023

Josephine Erin Dooley (born 21 January 2000) is an Australian cricketer who plays for the South Australian Scorpions in the Women's National Cricket League (WNCL). A right-handed wicket-keeper-batter, Dooley also plays for the Melbourne Renegades in the Women's Big Bash League (WBBL).

== Early life ==
Dooley attended Brisbane Girls Grammar School in Brisbane, Queensland.

== International tours ==
Dooley's first taste of representative honours occurred in November 2017 when she was selected to play a Twenty20 for the Governor-General's XI at Drummoyne Oval against a touring England team. She was then selected in Australia's Under 19 squad for a tour of South Africa in April 2018, and named in the first official Australia A women's squad which toured India in October 2018.

Following her second appearance for the Governor-General's XI, playing a 50-over match against a touring New Zealand team in February 2019, Dooley was again part of Australia's Under 19 squad in March 2019 which would tour New Zealand. Later that year, she toured England in June and was selected for a home series against India A in December, both as a member of the Australia A squad. Her third appearance for the Governor-General's XI occurred in January 2020, playing a Twenty20 against a touring Indian team.

== Domestic career ==
=== Women's National Cricket League ===
Dooley made her WNCL debut on 18 February 2018, playing for the Queensland Fire in a 31-run loss to the Western Fury. She managed a breakout performance in the first match of the following season on 21 September 2018, finishing with an unbeaten half-century to help her team secure a one-wicket win over New South Wales.

Ahead of the 2020–21 WNCL season, Dooley departed Queensland and joined South Australia. She recorded her maiden century on 19 March 2021, scoring 116 from 112 balls in a 61-run win against Tasmania.

=== Women's Big Bash League ===
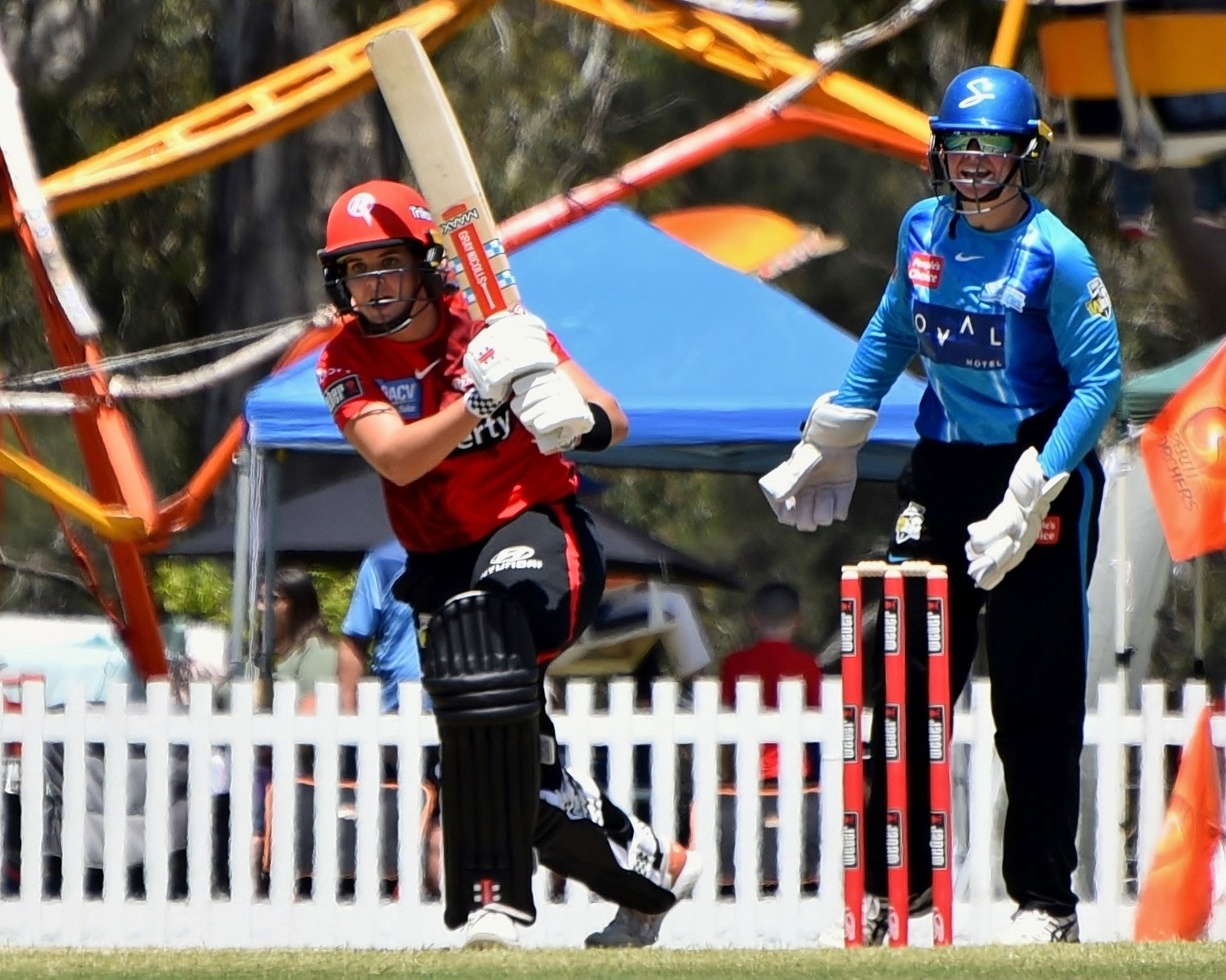
Dooley batting for the Melbourne Renegades during WBBL|07

In the lead-up to WBBL|04, Dooley sustained a broken finger injury, delaying her maiden Big Bash appearance. She debuted for the Brisbane Heat on 26 December 2018 in a five-wicket victory against the Perth Scorchers at Optus Stadium.

Dooley top-scored for the Heat in her third WBBL appearance, making 44 not out off 30 balls to help defeat the Hobart Hurricanes by 58 runs on 31 December 2018 at UTAS Stadium. She earned her first Player of the Match award in her team's next fixture, a 43-run win against the Adelaide Strikers at Harrup Park on 5 January 2019, scoring 48 not out from 33 balls. Dooley would go on to be a member of the Heat's championship team which defeated the Sydney Sixers in the final on 26 January at Drummoyne Oval.

On 19 May 2019, the Melbourne Renegades announced the signing of Dooley for WBBL|05, providing her with the chance to establish herself as a wicket-keeper—a position already occupied by Beth Mooney at the Heat. Her strongest contribution of the season came in a four-wicket semi-final loss at Allan Border Field against her former team, top-scoring for the Renegades with 50 not out off 42 balls.

== Personal life ==
Dooley is the daughter of Jon and Leanne. She has three brothers: Patrick, Louis and Will. Patrick is also a cricketer, currently in the Big Bash League for the Hobart Hurricanes.

In April 2024, Dooley suffered a stroke whilst holidaying in Hawaii and was medically evacuated to Australia.
