= David Boe =

American musician (1936–2020)

- Born: March 11, 1936; Duluth, Minnesota U.S.
- Died: April 28, 2020 (aged 84) Glenview, Illinois U.S.
- Occupation: Organist

David Stephen Boe (March 11, 1936 – April 28, 2020) was an American organist and head of the organ department of the Oberlin Conservatory of Music, where he taught from 1962 to 2008. He was most notable for his work as a pedagogue, having trained a large number of organists during his time at the conservatory.

== Life ==
Boe was born in Duluth, Minnesota, and attended St. Olaf College during his undergraduate years. He later studied with Arthur Poister at Syracuse University. As a Fulbright scholar, he studied with Helmut Walcha, and later with Gustav Leonhardt. Shortly after his study with Walcha, he was appointed to the organ faculty at Oberlin, from which he retired in 2008.

Boe commissioned organ-builder John Brombaugh's first major instrument, Opus 4, in Lorain, Ohio, and has always been keenly interested in historical performance and early temperaments. He was interviewed on the nationally televised program The Wind at One's Fingertips.

Since 1962, Boe taught hundreds of organists at Oberlin, including fellow Oberlin faculty member James David Christie. He retired in May, 2008, after 46 years of teaching.

Boe served as music director and organist for over 40 years at First Lutheran Church, Lorain, Ohio.

== Death ==
Boe died on April 28, 2020, of complications from COVID-19 at Glenbrook Hospital in Glenview, Illinois, during the COVID-19 pandemic in Illinois.
