= Patrick Dooley (cricketer) =

Australian cricketer

Paddy Dooley
Personal information
- Full name: Patrick Gabriel Dooley
- Born: 17 May 1997 (age 29)
- Batting: Left-handed
- Bowling: Left-arm unorthodox spin
- Role: Bowler
- Relatives: Josie Dooley (sister)

Domestic team information
- Years: Team
- 2021/22: Brisbane Heat
- 2022/23: Hobart Hurricanes
- 2022/23: Queensland
- 2025/26: Brisbane Heat

Career statistics
Competition	List A	T20
Matches	9	21
Runs scored	87	54
Batting average	14.50	13.50
100s/50s	0/0	0/0
Top score	39	19
Balls bowled	499	455
Wickets	10	26
Bowling average	47.40	22.19
5 wickets in innings	0	0
10 wickets in match	0	0
Best bowling	2/42	4/16
Catches/stumpings	2/-	4/0
- Source: Cricinfo, 15 December 2025

Patrick Gabriel Dooley (born 17 May 1997) is an Australian cricketer. He currently plays for the Brisbane Heat in the Big Bash League. He is a left-arm unorthodox spinner.

== Early life ==
Dooley attended Brisbane Grammar School in Brisbane, Queensland. He played Premier grade cricket for Wests and was an Australian under-16 representative. In 2020, he was named in the Queensland Cricket club team of the year having helped captain Wests' title-winning 50 over side.

== Career ==
In January 2022, Dooley debuted for the Brisbane Heat in the 2021–22 Big Bash League season. He joined the team as a Covid replacement player.

Dooley joined the Hobart Hurricanes for the 2022–23 Big Bash League season. On 19 December 2022, in just his third Big Bash game, Dooley took four wickets in a victory over the Perth Scorchers in Launceston. He finished with 19 wickets in 10 matches for the Hurricanes, making him the leading spinner in the competition.

On 26 February 2023, Dooley made his List A debut for Queensland against the New South Wales in the 2022–23 Marsh One-Day Cup.

In May 2023, Dooley signed a one-year deal with Tasmania.

Dooley re-joined the Hobart Hurricanes for the 2023–24 Big Bash League season.

In December 2025, Dooley rejoined the Brisbane Heat for the 2025–26 Big Bash League season as a local replacement player for Matthew Kuhnemann.

== Personal life ==
Dooley is the son of Jon and Leanne. He has three siblings, brothers Louis and Will, and sister Josie. His sister is also a cricket player in the Women's Big Bash League for the Melbourne Renegades.
