= Edith Alice Waterworth =

Australian welfare worker, columnist and women's rights activist

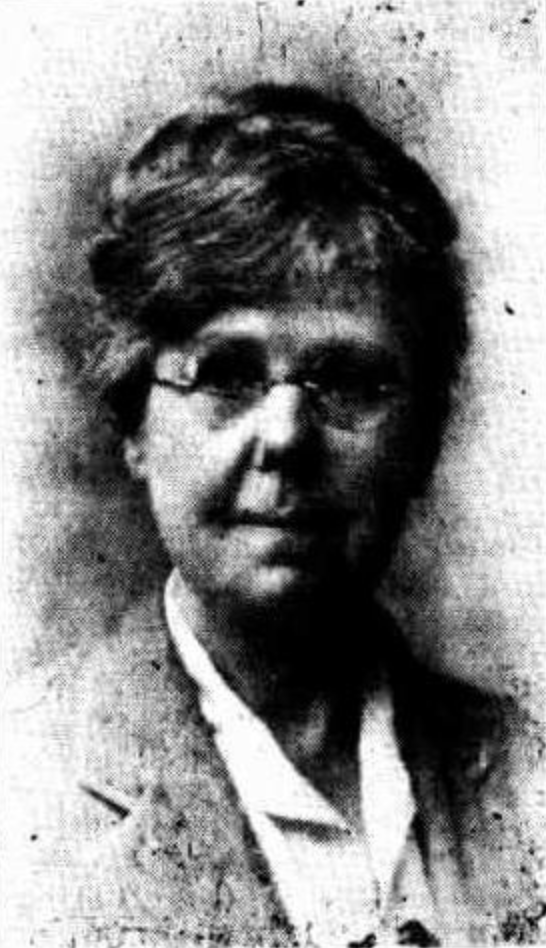
Edith Alice Waterworth

Edith Alice Waterworth OBE (18 October 1873 – 6 November 1957) was an Australian welfare worker, columnist and women's rights activist from the 19th century. She fought to liberalise Tasmania for women and she often petitioned the government to implement these changes.

== Early life ==
Edith Alice Waterworth was born on 18 October 1873 in Castleton, Lancashire, England, the daughter of Henry Hawker and Irish born Emma (née Hamilton). Waterworth's family eventually moved to Queensland, Australia and she was educated at Brisbane Girls Grammar School.

== Career ==
Waterworth became a teacher and she taught at state schools for years.

=== Politics ===
In 1922 and later in 1925 Waterworth ran two unsuccessful campaigns for the Parliament of Tasmania. During these two unsuccessful campaigns for the parliament, Waterworth's campaign ran on a platform for widows, deserted wives and for their children. She also advocated for the admission of women on juries and to be made justices in addition to cross-examination changes for women. For health-related issues, Waterworth campaigned for better maternity hospitals and bush nursing services and for a domestic science training centre. Her 1922 vote percentage (6.5 per cent of the primary vote), was the highest per cent of a vote that a female candidate got in such an election in Australia until 1955 when Amelia Best became the first female elected to the House of Assembly.

Despite these unsuccessful campaigns, Waterworth became president of the Women's Non-Party League in 1929. In 1943 she ran unsuccessfully for the Tasmanian Legislative Council. Waterworth was also a member of the Women's Criminal Law Reform Association.

=== Advocacy ===
Waterworth attended advocacy events like the Women's International League for Peace and Freedom in Washington, DC in 1924 and the International Alliance of Women for Suffrage and Equal Citizenship in Berlin in 1929. In 1935, Waterworth embarked on a fundraising tour throughout Tasmania for the King George V and Queen Mary maternal and infant welfare appeal; her motto for this was 'Make Motherhood Worthwile.' Waterworth advocated that the betterment of women in their homes would improve the falling birthrates. Waterworth helped create and chair the Tasmanian Council for Mother and Child through her bridging the welfare work for women. Moreover, she founded the Child Welfare Association in 1917 due in part to her views eugenic views.

Despite being known to campaign for women's rights, Waterworth also campaigned for boys too. In 1925, she was appointed to a committee by the Australian government to report on the workings of the Boys' Training School (aka State Farm and School for Boys). The committee recommended that the boys be encouraged instead of harshly disciplined and classified based on certain facts like age, mental health, qualifications and behaviour. They also asked for the Navy to accept boys from reformatories. These changes sought to touch up the 1918 Children of the State Act to be more innovative and gentle.

== Further career ==
Waterworth was also on the National Council of Women and the Free Kindergarten Association and the Board of Censors of Moving Pictures. She was a columnist in The Mercury where she was outspoken and earned the nickname 'Mrs Hot Waterworth'. Waterworth was also a eugenicist. and she also stated that sex offenders were not normal mentally and she called for them to be cured via operations. She was appointed O.B.E in 1935 in recognition of her work in maternal and child welfare.

== Personal life ==
Waterworth was married to John Newham Waterworth for 46 years until his death on 3 August 1949 and they had three children together. She died on 6 November 1957 in Sandy Bay.
