= Margy Osmond =

Australian businesswoman

Margy Osmond is an Australian businesswoman and current Chief Executive Officer of the Tourism & Transport Forum (TTF), the peak national industry group for the tourism, aviation and transport sectors. Prior to joining TTF in October 2014, she was CEO of the Australian National Retailers Association (ANRA).

Osmond was the inaugural CEO of ANRA which was established in 2006 as a lobby and research organisation to be the voice of the large national retailers in Australia.

Prior to this appointment Osmond was the CEO of the State and Sydney Chambers of Commerce in NSW for five years and founder of the Sydney 2000 Olympic Commerce Centre and the Sydney First projects. In that role she sat on the Olympic Business Roundtable, the Rugby World Cup Business Roundtable, the G’Day LA Business Roundtable and the Forbes Conference Bidding Group.

Born in Sydney and educated at Brisbane Girls Grammar School, Osmond moved to New South Wales in 1980 and worked in media and public relations for government departments including fisheries and health before taking up a position as media liaison officer for the Royal Tours of Australia in 1988.

She was appointed media adviser to the NSW Minister for Business and Consumer Affairs under Premier Nick Greiner in 1998 and later became Chief of Staff to the NSW Minister for State and Regional Development.

Osmond joined the State Chamber of Commerce in 1996 and was appointed CEO in 2001.

Osmond is a member of the Boards of the Australian Sports Commission, Bell Shakespeare and has recently been appointed as Chair of the TAFE NSW Commission Board. She also chairs the Retail Advisory Panel established by the City of Sydney.

Her previous Board appointments include the Retail Employees Superannuation Trust, Tourism NSW, the NSW Major Events Board, the NSW Police Minister's Advisory Board and State Transit Authority. In addition Osmond chaired the bid and official Organising Committee for the largest non-elite sporting event in the world, the International World Masters Games, held in Sydney in 2009.
