= Louise McDonald =

Australian headmistress (1903 – 1988)

Louise Warden McDonald
- Born: Louise Warden Crooks; 14 July 1903; Belfast
- Died: 20 November 1988 (aged 85); Gympie
- Education: University of Queensland
- Employer: Brisbane Girls Grammar School
- Known for: Headmistress
- Predecessor: Kathleen Mitford Lilley
- Spouse: Hugh McCallum McDonald

Louise Warden McDonald born Louise Warden Crooks (14 July 1903 – 20 November 1988) was an Irish born Australian headmistress at Brisbane Girls Grammar School. She introduced houses. She improved the teaching of science and the resulting science block was named for her.

== Life ==
McDonald was born in 1903 in Belfast, but by 1912 she was in Brisbane in Australia where her parents, Theresa (born Hogan) and Silas Crooks, had emigrated. The family lived in the Brisbane suburb of Paddington where her father worked as a draper. She attended Brisbane Normal School and she was at what is now called St Margaret's Anglican Girls' School from 1919 to 1922. She was Dux and led the school's debating society. She went on to study science at the University of Queensland and she gained her degree in 1926.

In 1940 she was first employed by Brisbane Girls’ Grammar School where Kathleen M. Lilley was the head and she was proud of the school's reputation for English.

Lilley retired and McDonald, then still named Crooks, took over as head in 1952. She wanted more of the students to study science but it was tricky to find competent science teachers and facilities were essential. McDonald argued that the school's trustees should apply for Commonwealth money and this approach led to success. The new money was used to build science laboratories for the school that opened in 1964 and a science block that followed in 1969. Houses were introduced at Brisbane Girls’ Grammar School to encourage co-curricular competition in 1964. There were initially ten houses with five named after former chairs of governors and the other five O’Connor, Mackinlay, Beanland, Wilkinson and Mackay were the names of former headmistresses.

McDonald's husband died in 1968 and she retired in 1970.

== Death and legacy ==
Her school's science block was refurbished in 2003 and it was named for McDonald who had died in 1988 at Gympie.

== Private life ==
At the end of 1958 she married at Brisbane's St Andrew’s Presbyterian Church, Hugh McCallum McDonald. He was a divorcee. At the end of her life she was cared for by her step-daughter.
