= Brisbane Girls Grammar School =

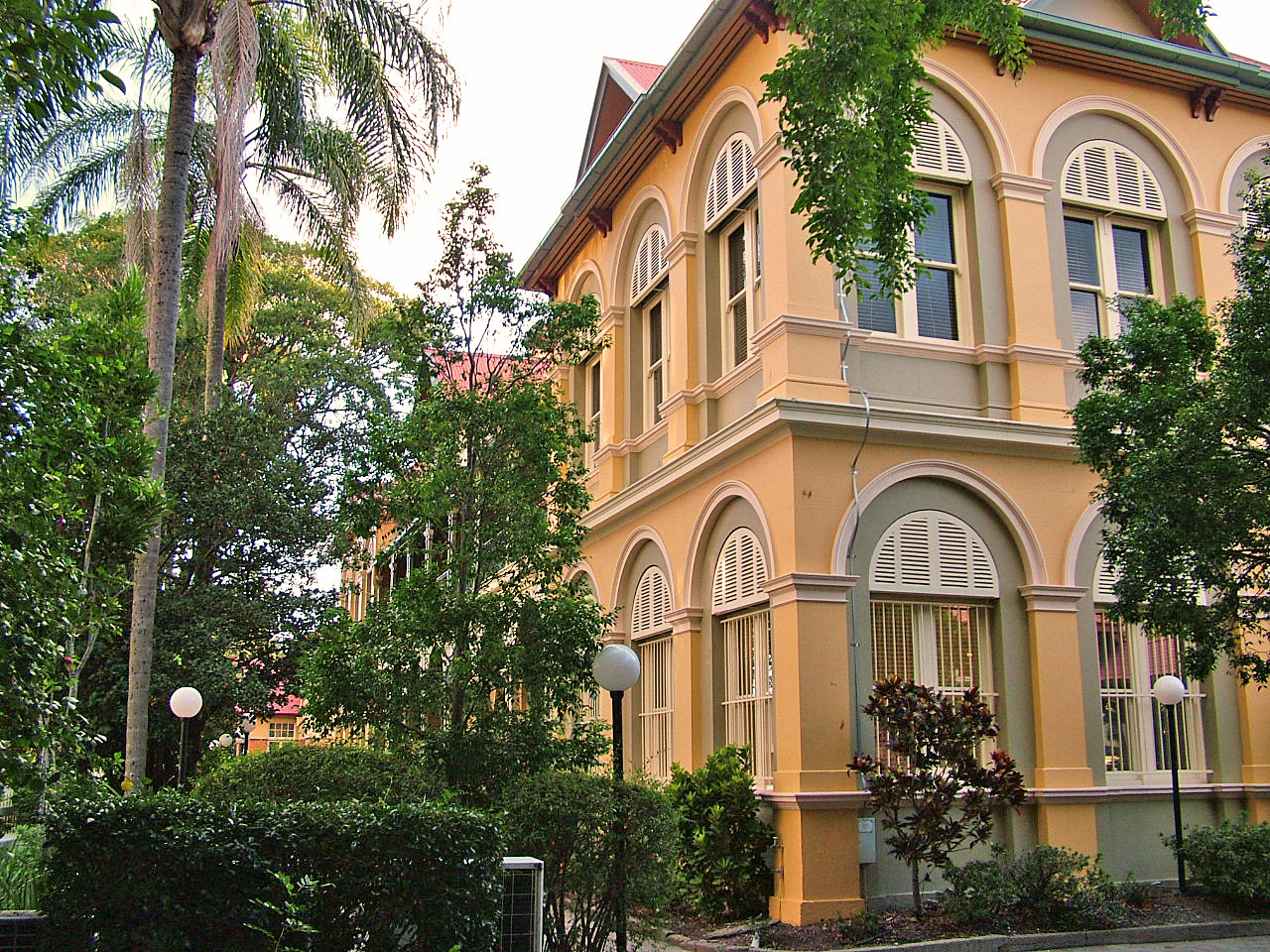
- The main building, in 2011

Location
- Gregory Terrace; Spring Hill, Queensland, 4000; Australia; 27°27′30″S 153°1′11″E

Information
- Type: Independent secondary day school
- Motto: Latin: Nil Sine Labore (Nothing without labour)
- Denomination: Non-denominational
- Established: 1875; 151 years ago
- Sister school: Brisbane Grammar School
- Principal: Jacinda Euler
- Gender: Girls
- Enrolment: c. 1,550
- Colour: Royal blue
- Affiliations: Association of Heads of Independent Schools of Australia; International Coalition of Girls' Schools; Queensland Girls' Secondary Schools Sports Association
- Website: bggs.qld.edu.au

Brisbane Girls Grammar School is an independent non-denominational secondary day school for girls, located in Spring Hill, an inner suburb of Brisbane, Queensland, Australia. Founded in 1875, the school is one of eight grammar schools in Queensland that were established under the Grammar Schools Act of 1860. The school originally opened as a branch of the Brisbane Grammar School with fifty students under the direction of a principal, Janet O'Connor.

Brisbane Girls Grammar School is affiliated with the Association of Heads of Independent Schools of Australia (AHISA), the International Coalition of Girls' Schools, and is a member of the Queensland Girls' Secondary Schools Sports Association (QGSSSA).

Brisbane Girls Grammar School has approximately 1,550 students enrolled in Years 7 to 12. Its brother school is Brisbane Grammar School. The School opened its Junior School in 2026, taking in students in Years 5 and 6.

== History ==
Brisbane Girls Grammar School was founded in March 1875, six years before women were admitted to universities in Sydney and Melbourne. The school opened as a branch of Brisbane Grammar School with fifty female students under the direction of a lady principal, Janet O'Connor, in premises on George Street, Brisbane. Within six months the school outgrew these premises and subsequently moved to a site on Wickham Terrace.

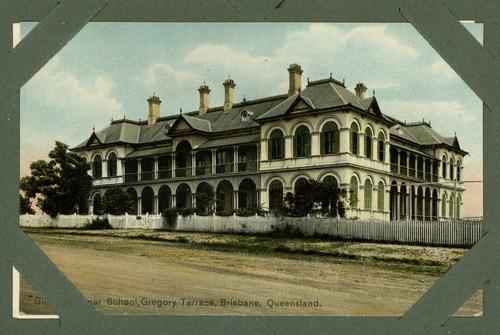
Main Building, c. 1910

By July 1882, the school was well established and a decision was made to separate from Brisbane Grammar School, so as to operate independently under the Grammar Schools Act. Plans were also made to move the school to its present location on Gregory Terrace, Spring Hill. In 1884, the Main Building, designed by architect Richard Gailey, was opened to one hundred students.

The school's motto is Nil Sine Labore, Latin for "Nothing Without Labour". It was adopted from the Brisbane Grammar School, which in turn borrowed it from Horace's Second Book of Satires. The school badge is an open book on a shield with the school motto on a ribbon underneath. The open book was also borrowed from Oxford University, where over half of the original staff of Brisbane Grammar School were originally secured.The School colour is royal blue, adopted from the colours of Brisbane Grammar School, which were originally derived as a compromise between the Oxford colour of light blue and the Cambridge colour of dark blue.

In 2007, the $25 million, six-level Cherrell Hirst Creative Learning Centre opened, winning several awards including the prestigious Sir Zelman Cowen Award for public architecture in 2008. In 2009 a new 25-metre (82 ft) suspended swimming pool and multi-purpose covered area were completed. The Gehrmann Building, constructed in 1986, was renovated in 2011.

In 2015, the five-storey, $17.4 million Elizabeth Jameson Research Learning Centre opened, to coincide with the introduction of Year 7 to the school. Home to a collection of more than 55,000 resources, the Research Learning Centre provides numerous flexible contemporary learning spaces as well as space for individual study.

In 2026, the school opened its Junior School, expanding enrollment to include students in Years 5 and 6.

== Co-curriculum ==
Brisbane Girls Grammar offers 18 competitive and non-competitive sports. The School is a founding member of the Queensland Girls’ Secondary Schools Sporting Association (QGSSSA) competition, and participates in a range of Brisbane Club associations as well as operating a comprehensive Interhouse programme.

QGSSSA: Australian rules football, artistic gymnastics, athletics, badminton, basketball, cricket, cross country, football, hockey, netball, rhythmic gymnastics, softball (retired 2024), swimming, tennis, touch and volleyball. Club: Fencing (QFA), Rowing (BRSA) and water polo (BWPI) Lifestyle: Yoga, pilates and rock climbing.

The three core music domains (strings, band and choir) offer more than 900 places for students to pursue their musical talents at their specific level of proficiency. Specialist music staff provide instrumental and vocal tuition in group and private lessons.

In addition, the School offers a range of clubs and activities including debating, calligraphy, design club, and a music studio.

== Principals ==
Ordinal	Officeholder	Term start	term end	Time in office	Notes
1	Janet O'Connor	1875	1876	0–1 years	
2	Sarah Cargill	1877	1878	0–1 years	
3	Mary Mackinlay	1878	1881	2–3 years	
4	Sophia Beanland	1882	1889	6–7 years	
5	Charlotte Pells	1889	1895	5–6 years	
6	Eliza Fewings	1896	1899	2–3 years	
7	Milisent Wilkinson	1900	1912	11–12 years	
8	Mary Atkinson Williams	1913	1914	0–1 years	
9	Jane Walker	1914	1915	0–1 years	
10	Annie Mackay	1916	1924	7–8 years	
11	Kathleen Lilley	1925	1952	26–27 years	
12	Louise McDonald	1952	1970	17–18 years	(née Louise Crooks)
13	Nancy Shaw	1971	1976	4–5 years	
14	Judith Hancock AM	1977	2001	23–24 years	
15	Amanda Bell AM	2001	2012	10–11 years	
16	Jacinda Euler	2013	incumbent	12–13 years	

== House system ==
As with most Australian schools, Brisbane Girls Grammar School uses a house system. The house system provides a framework of support for students during their years at the school. The house system originated in 1964, with 10 houses that were amalgamated to five in 1966. In 1973 the house system reverted to Interform Competitions but was reintroduced in 1980. Since then, some of the previously discontinued houses have returned, while new houses have been created. There are currently nine houses, each named after past principals and teachers of the school as well as previous chairmen of the board of trustees:

House	Colour	Name Origin
Beanland	Pink	Named after Sophia Beanland, the former Head Mistress of the school from 1882 to 1889. The house was first established in 1964 when the school had ten Houses, each with approximately fifty students. Beanland House and four other houses were discontinued in 1966, as the system of ten houses was not manageable. Beanland House was reintroduced in 1994.
England	Blue	Named after John Edwyn England, one of the longest serving trustees of the school. He was a member of the trust for 20 years and was chairman of the board from 1952 to June 1963.
Gibson	Purple	Originally formed in 1964 and lasted until 1973 when the house system was discontinued in favour of a horizontal division based on year groups. Gibson House was officially reconstituted in February 1980 after a gap of seven years and is named in honour of Major John Lockhart Gibson, M.D. one of Brisbane's best-known doctors. Gibson was appointed Vice-Chairman of the school board of trustees in 1906. From 1929 until his resignation in 1940, he served as chairman of the board.
Griffith	Red	Originally established in 1964 and combined with Mackinlay House in 1966 to form a larger Griffith house. It continued in this form until 1973, when the house system was discontinued. Griffith House was officially reconstituted in February 1980 and is named in honour of Sir Samuel Walter Griffith, former Chairman of Trustees, Premier of the Colony of Queensland, Chief Justice of Queensland and the first Chief Justice of the High Court of Australia.
Hirschfeld	Orange	Named after Konrad Hirschfeld who served as chairman of the board of Brisbane Girls Grammar School between 1963 and 1976. Hirschfeld was involved in many aspects of the medical profession and also had an enduring passion and commitment to education. Hirschfeld House was formed in 1980 in recognition of his services to education and the school.
Lilley	Green	One of nine houses established in 1964. Lilley House was named after Sir Charles Lilley, the former Premier and Chief Justice of Queensland, and the founder of Brisbane Girls Grammar School. Particularly influential in the educational arena, Sir Charles Lilley had a substantial influence on the Education Act 1875 and was responsible for the introduction of free education in Queensland in 1870.
Mackay	White	Started in 1998 and named after Margaret Annie Mackay, a pupil at the school in its early days. She became a teacher at Brisbane Girls Grammar School and was appointed Head Mistress in 1916. She retired in 1924.
O'Connor	Maroon	Named after Brisbane Girls' Grammar School's first Headmistress, Janet O'Connor. From 1875 to December 1876, O'Connor led the fledgeling school which was then located on George Street. O'Connor House was established in 1964 and was discontinued in 1966. In 1990, it was re-established and adopted maroon as its colour.
Woolcock	Yellow	First established in 1964 and named after John Laskey Woolcock in recognition of his contribution to the school and to education in general. In 1966, Woolcock and O'Connor Houses combined, keeping the name Woolcock. In 1973 the House was discontinued but was re-established in 1980.

== Campuses and facilities ==
In addition to the main school site at Gregory Terrace, Spring Hill, the school has a Sports Campus, Rangakarra, in the Brisbane suburb of Fig Tree Pocket and an outdoor education campus, Marrapatta, in the Mary Valley.

Brisbane Campus, Gregory Terrace, Spring Hill

Since 1884, Brisbane Girls Grammar has continually developed their main campus. Recent building projects include the Science Learning Centre, opened in October 2020 by His Excellency, the Honourable Paul de Jersey AC. The building’s seven storeys offer dedicated floors and specialised equipment for each scientific discipline (Biology, Chemistry, Physics and Junior Science). In 2015, to coincide with the introduction of Year 7, the school developed the Elizabeth Jameson Research Learning Centre. The Cherrel Hirst Creative Learning Centre, opened in 2007, houses music, drama, computer technology and art facilities. Additional Main Campus facilities include a 25-metre suspended swimming pool, the Gehrmann Theatre and the McCrae Grassie Sports Centre.

Marrapatta Memorial Outdoor Education Centre

The school operates a dedicated Outdoor education Centre in the Mary Valley at Imbil, approximately 2 hours drive north of Brisbane.

Rangakarra Recreational and Environmental Education Centre

In 2013, Brisbane Girls Grammar School acquired a 13-hectare site in Fig Tree Pocket, which comprises two playing fields and three ovals. It is 12 kilometres (7.5 mi) from the CBD and is the home ground for sports such as hockey, cricket and touch. The campus is also used to teach environmental sciences, with school groups working with local organisations to rehabilitate areas of ecological significance. The site was officially named Rangakarra Recreational and Environmental Education Centre on 23 May 2015 and the Main Field was renamed the Daphne Welch (1949) Oval in honour of past student and athlete Daphne Pirie (Welch) MBE, AO. The second oval is called the Pauline Harvey-Short Oval, named after dedicated alumnae and staff member, Pauline Harvey-Short (Harvey, 1971).

== Notable alumnae ==
- Minna Atherton – Australian competitive swimmer and 100m backstroke world record holder
- Betty Churcher AO – artist and former director of the Australian National Gallery (attended Somerville House from age 7–15)
- Shelley Craft – television presenter
- Rhoda Felgate – speech and drama teacher and founder of Brisbane's Twelfth Night Theatre.
- Lucy Fry – actress
- Professor Adele Green AC – Queenslander of the Year 2013, epidemiologist, Queensland Institute of Medical Research.
- Air Vice Marshal Julie Hammer AM, CSC – engineer
- Gwen Harwood AO – poet
- Professor Dorothy Hill AC, CBE – geologist
- May Darlington Lahey – lawyer and judge
- Margaret McMurdo AC – president and judge of Queensland Court of Appeal
- Margy Osmond – businesswoman
- Professor Cheryl Praeger AM – mathematician
- Judith Rodriguez (née Green) – poet
- Myf Shepherd – international model
- Lenore Taylor – editor of The Guardian Australia
- Edith Alice Waterworth OBE – welfare worker, columnist and women's rights activist
- Grace Wilson CBE, RRC - high-ranked nurse in the Australian Army during World War I and the first years of World War II

== See also ==
- List of schools in Queensland
- Education in Australia
- Queensland Great Public Schools
