= Ruwantha Kellepotha =

Sri Lankan cricketer (born 1991)

Personal information
- Born: 13 July 1991; Kandy, Central Province, Sri Lanka
- Batting: Right-handed
- Bowling: Right-arm leg-break
- Role: Bowler

Domestic team information
- Years: Team
- Moors Sports Club
- Sri Lanka Police Sports Club
- Kurunegala Youth Cricket Club
- 2022/23-2023/24: Victoria
- 2022/23-2023/24: Melbourne Renegades
- 2025/26-: Tasmania

Career statistics
| Competition | FC | LA | T20 |
|---|---|---|---|
| Matches | 24 | 15 | 3 |
| Runs scored | 723 | 44 | 2 |
| Batting average | 38.05 | 4.88 | - |
| 100s/50s | 1/2 | 0/0 | 0/0 |
| Top score | 100* | 15 | 1* |
| Balls bowled | 2,936 | 596 | 60 |
| Wickets | 66 | 22 | 3 |
| Bowling average | 31.13 | 23.09 | 25.00 |
| 5 wickets in innings | 2 | 1 | 0 |
| 10 wickets in match | 0 | 0 | 0 |
| Best bowling | 5/66 | 5/40 | 2/32 |
| Catches/stumpings | 22/- | 6/- | 0/- |
- Source: Cricinfo, 21 October 2025

Ruwantha Prasad Kellepotha also known as Ruwantha Kellapotha (born 13 July 1991) is a Sri Lankan first-class cricketer who currently resides in Australia. He has played in 21 first-class matches with 20 of them occurring on Sri Lankan soil between 2011 and 2013 while a solitary first-class appearance came on Australian soil.

== Early career ==
Ruwantha Kellepotha pursued his primary and secondary education at St. Thomas' College, Matale. He played school cricket for St. Thomas' College, Matale, in various age groups including under-12 (2003), under-13 (2004), under-15 (2005), under-17 (2006-2007) and under-18 (2005-2010). Kellepotha has also captained his school team in under-15, under-17 and under-19 age categories. He made rapid strides through school cricket with his all-round prowess and was a consistent performer at school level matches representing his school.

Kellepotha had a stellar 2009-2010 Sri Lankan schools cricket season with the ball by grabbing 108 wickets and was adjudged the Best Bowler Outstation during the 32nd edition of the Observer-Mobitel Schoolboy Cricketer of the Year awards in 2010. He also became the first player from St. Thomas' College, Matale to take 100 wickets in a single schools cricket season. He was also the first player from a Central Province school as well as from outstation school to complete a haul of 100 wickets for the 2009–2010 season.

Kellepotha was also adjudged as runner-up for Best Allrounder category and runner-up in Outstation Schoolboy Cricketer of the Year during the 2010 Observer-Mobitel Schoolboy Cricketer of the Year awards. He also ensured success during the 2008-2009 schools cricket season capturing 87 wickets.

Kellepotha has also played for Ragama Cricket Club in the SLC under-23 cricket tournament.

Kellepotha made his List A debut in the Sri Lankan domestic circuit playing for Moors Sports Club against Sri Lanka Air Force Sports Club on 31 December 2010 at the Moors Sports Club Ground during the 2010 Premier Limited Overs Tournament Tier B. He made his first-class debut in the Sri Lankan domestic circuit for Moors Sports Club against Seeduwa Raddoluwa Cricket Club on 4 March 2011 at the Moors Sports Club Ground during the 2011 Premier League Tournament Tier B.

== Domestic career in Australia ==
Kellepotha moved to Melbourne, Australia in 2013 in pursuit of better career opportunities. Since his arrival to Australia, he has played in lower level competitions including a stint of eight seasons with Dandenong District Cricket Association in Melbourne's south-eastern suburbs where he plied his trade for four different clubs. He later began playing in Victorian Premier Cricket for Casey-South Melbourne Cricket Club in 2022 season and he soon emerged as the club's main to go-man with the ball after becoming the leading wicket-taker of the competition with a record 46 wickets across the First XI and Super Slam matches during the season and he also played an important role in helping Casey-South to reach the final of the competition in March 2022. In March 2022, he won the prestigious Alan Wookey medal after being adjudged as the best player in the turf 1 season In August 2022, he also played for Melbourne Renegades Academy in the Top End T20 Series in Darwin featuring in three games. In November 2021, he received call-up to join Victoria Second XI team despite having played only one Premier Cricket match.

In September 2022, Kellepotha was signed as an overseas replacement player by Melbourne Renegades for both Mujeeb Ur Rahman and Akeal Hosein as both of them later withdrew from the 2022–23 Big Bash League season in order to make themselves available for United Arab Emirates's new T20 franchise competition International League T20. His signing created shockwaves as he had never played in a T20 match before being drafted to the Big Bash League, which is Australia's top domestic T20 League. His impressive performances in the 2022 Premier Cricket and the Top End T20 Series were also instrumental in gaining Big Bash League contract with Melbourne Renegades. He also became the first Sri Lankan professional cricketer in nearly seven years to be contracted with a Big Bash League club since Kumar Sangakkara. He made his T20 debut for the Melbourne Renegades, on 10 January 2023 against the Adelaide Strikers in the 2023 BBL.

Kellepotha made his comeback return to first-class cricket after a gap of nine years during the 2022–23 Sheffield Shield season which is a top-tier domestic first-class competition in Australia. It also marked his first stint with Sheffield Shield and his selection into the Victorian squad as an overseas player was a surprise package and also raised eyebrows due to the fact that he had not played in any form of a competitive cricket match since 22 March 2013 as he last turned up for Kurunegala Youth Cricket Club in a first-class match against Chilaw Marians Cricket Club. He subsequently made his Sheffield Shield debut representing Victoria against South Australia on 17 October 2022 at the age of 31 albeit of an injury concern to Jon Holland and it also marked his debut in Australian top-tier state cricket. He also became the first international player to be recruited by Victoria men's cricket team since Fawad Ahmed's signing in February 2013. On his Sheffield Shield debut match, he returned with figures of 2 for 122 runs in a long marathon spell of 26.2 overs in the first innings which also included the priced scalps of Cameron Bancroft and D'Arcy Short. Meanwhile, he followed it up with a spell of conceding 47 runs in 12 overs without claiming a wicket in the second innings as the match ended in a high scoring draw. He also became the fifth Sri Lankan to play for an Australian state team in Sheffield Shield history after Pat McCarthy, Gamini Goonesena, Malcolm Francke and Dav Whatmore.
