= Myfanwy (given name) =

Myfanwy (Welsh: [məˈvanʊɨ̯, məˈvanʊi̯], from Welsh annwyl 'beloved') is a feminine given name popularised by the Welsh song, Myfanwy composed by Joseph Parry and first published in 1875.

The name may refer to:

- Myfanwy Ashmore (born 1970), Canadian artist
- Myfanwy Bekker, South African artist
- Myfanwy Fychan (born mid-14th century), Welsh noblewoman, subject of many poems
- Myfanwy Haycock (1913–1963), Welsh poet
- Myfanwy Horne (1933–2013), Australian journalist, writer, reviewer and book editor
- Myfanwy Howell (1903-1988), Welsh television broadcaster
- Myfanwy Macleod (born 1961), Canadian artist
- Myfanwy Pavelic (1916–2007), Canadian portrait painter
- Myfanwy Piper (1911–1997), British art critic and opera librettist
- Myfanwy Pryce (1890–1976), Welsh novelist and short story writer
- Myfanwy Talog (1944–1995), Welsh actress
- Myfanwy Warhurst (born 1973), Australian radio announcer
- Myfanwy Waring (born 1977), Welsh actress
- Myvanwy M. Dick (1910–1993), British-American zoologist and curator
