= Myf Shepherd =

Australian fashion model

- Born: Myfanwy Amy Elizabeth Shepherd; 4 April 1991 (age 35); Cairns, Queensland, Australia
- Modeling information
- Height: 5 ft 11 in (1.80 m)
- Hair color: Brown
- Eye color: Blue
- Agency: NEXT Models Chic Models Management

Myfanwy Amy Elizabeth Shepherd (born 4 April 1991), known professionally as Myf Shepherd, is an Australian fashion model.

== Early and personal life ==
She was born in Cairns, Australia in 1991 and attended Brisbane Girls Grammar School. She auditioned for Cycle 4 of Australia's Next Top Model, but was rejected by the judges. Only a few months later, she walked runways in New York City, London, Paris, and Milan.

Shepherd is a vegan.
