= Judith Hancock =

Australian educator and high school principal

Judith Anne Hancock AM (born 25 August 1937 in Lismore, New South Wales) is an Australian retired educator and high school principal.

She worked as a science Teacher at Dover Heights Girls High School, Science Mistress at Sydney Church of England Girls' Grammar School and Deputy Principal at Presbyterian Ladies' College, Sydney.

Hancock became principal of Brisbane Girls Grammar School in 1977. The Hancock Communication Centre at the school is named after her.

In 2000, Hancock was appointed a Member of the Order of Australia.

Hancock was appointed as a member of the Board of Trustees of the Rockhampton Girls Grammar School from 11 November 2010 until 30 January 2012.
