= David Taylor (Australian cricketer) =

Australian cricketer

Personal information
- Born: 2 May 1881; Sydney, Australia
- Source: ESPNcricinfo, 3 February 2017

David Taylor (born 2 May 1881, date of death unknown) was an Australian cricketer. He played one first-class match for New South Wales in 1907/08.

Locally, Taylor played for Glebe District Club. His first-class opportunity came in Brisbane against Queensland, playing as a wicket-keeper in Charles Gorry's absence. Taylor did not "set the world a-fire" in the match, according to "Recorder", a columnist in the Sydney Sportsman, but they believed "his time would come".

Reviewers described Taylor as a "hard-hitting batsman" and compared him to preceding New South Wales cricketers Hugh Massie and Charles Bannerman.

== See also ==
- List of New South Wales representative cricketers
