= Carlo Curley =

American musician

- Born: Carlo James Curley; August 24, 1952; Monroe, North Carolina
- Died: August 11, 2012 (aged 59); Melton Mowbray, England
- Occupation: Classical concert organist

Carlo James Curley (August 24, 1952 – August 11, 2012) was an American classical concert organist who lived much of his later life in Great Britain.

Curley was born into a musical family in Monroe, North Carolina, US, and attended the North Carolina School of the Arts and by the age of 15 was organist at a large Baptist church in Atlanta, Georgia. He subsequently studied with Virgil Fox, Robert Elmore, George Thalben-Ball and Arthur Poister. His long-time friend and confidant Robert Noehren was another noted influence. At 18, he was director of music at Girard College in Philadelphia. Curley developed his performance style in the manner of Virgil Fox, with respect to popularising classical organ music popular to a wider audience, which included his arrangements and transcriptions of pieces from other classical genres.

He was the resident organist at the Alexandra Palace in the 1970s and was the first classical organist to perform a solo organ recital at the White House for President Jimmy Carter. He also played before several European heads of state and toured extensively throughout the world, earning the marketing nickname "the Pavarotti of the Organ". He was one of only a few concert organists worldwide who supported themselves exclusively by giving recitals, concerts and master classes, without any supplement from teaching or church position.

Curley used a substantial Allen touring organ where the venue lacked an instrument of sufficient scope to support his repertoire. He recorded commercially for various labels such as RCA, ProArte, Rediffusion and Decca International. He participated in several 'Battle of the Organs' concerts, and his final such concert was in June 2012 at Liverpool Anglican Cathedral with his friend Ian Tracey using a Copeman Hart instrument.

He served as patron for numerous music societies as well as for the newly formed British Academy of Music. He was involved in organ design and construction and served as advisor to numerous clients, including Melbourne City Council (Australia), and The Cube, Shiroishi (Japan). His autobiography In The Pipeline was published by HarperCollins in 1998. One of his Allen organs is now used in the Cathedral of St Michael and St George in Aldershot in the UK.

A life-long bachelor, Curley died on 11 August 2012 aged 59 in Melton Mowbray, England. His ashes are interred in the grounds of Pershore Abbey in Worcestershire.

== Discography ==
=== Albums ===
- Principals Unshackled (early 1970s), recorded at Fountain Street Church, Grand Rapids, Michigan
- Sculpture in Sound (1970s), recorded at Atlantis Sound Studios in Decatur, Georgia
- Carlo Curley Plays Bach (1978), recorded at Vangede Church, Copenhagen, Denmark (RCA)
- The Incredible Carlo Curley Plays the Organ of the Royal Albert Hall (1978)
- Carlo Curley – Goes Digital (1979), Chalfont Records
- Popular Organ Pieces (1984)
- The Finest Hour (1987), Proarte
- The Emperor's Fanfare (1990), Decca (on Argo label)
- Brightly Shining (1991), Decca (on Argo label)
- Organ Imperial (1991), Decca (on Argo label)
- Organ Fantasia (1992), Decca (on Argo label)
- Bach Favourite Organ Works (1992), Universal
- Dueling Organs (1993), Proarte - with Lyn Larsen
- The World of Carlo Curley (1994), Decca
- Bach Great Organ Works (1995), Decca
- Inaugural Concert (1997)
- Toccata - Organ Favourites (1998), Decca
- Concert Favorites (1998)
- A Genesis in Harmony (2003)

=== Video ===
- Organ Imperial (1993), Decca
- The Carlo Curley Classic Collection volumes 1, 2 and 3 (2009)
