= 2022–23 Big Bash League season =

12th edition of the Big Bash League

2022–23 Big Bash League
- Dates: 13 December 2022 – 4 February 2023
- Administrator: Cricket Australia
- Cricket format: Twenty20
- Tournament format(s): Double round-robin and playoffs
- Champions: Perth Scorchers (5th title)
- Participants: 8
- Matches: 61
- Attendance: 1,019,891 (16,720 per match)
- Player of the series: Matt Short (Adelaide Strikers)
- Most runs: Aaron Hardie (Perth Scorchers) (460)
- Most wickets: Sean Abbott (Sydney Sixers) (29)
- Official website: cricket.com.au/big-bash

The 2022–23 Big Bash League season or BBL|12 was the twelfth edition of the Big Bash League (BBL), the professional men's Twenty20 domestic cricket competition in Australia. The round-robin phase of the tournament ran from 13 December 2022 to 4 February 2023 with Perth Scorchers dominating the standings. Perth won their fifth BBL title, beating Brisbane Heat in the final by five wickets.

== Background ==
Perth Scorchers were the defending champions, having won their fourth title in the 2021–22 Big Bash League season. The season saw the implementation of the international draft system, and removal of the Bash Boost point and X-Factor from the tournament. The Decision Review System was also implemented for the first time, with each team having one review available per innings, retaining the review if successful.

== Teams ==
=== Personnel and stadiums ===
Team	Home ground/s (capacity)	Captain/s	Head coach
Adelaide Strikers	Adelaide Oval (53,583)	Travis Head	Jason Gillespie
Brisbane Heat	The Gabba (42,000); Carrara Stadium (25,000)	Usman Khawaja	Wade Seccombe
Hobart Hurricanes	Bellerive Oval (20,000); York Park (21,000)	Matthew Wade	Adam Griffith
Melbourne Renegades	Docklands Stadium (48,003); Kardinia Park (26,000) (Note: During the season, the stadium was undergoing construction, which had reduced the stadium's capacity to around 26,000. The stadium will have a capacity of 40,000 once construction is complete.)	Nic Maddinson	David Saker
Melbourne Stars	Melbourne Cricket Ground (100,024); Junction Oval (7,000)	Glenn Maxwell; Adam Zampa	David Hussey
Perth Scorchers	Perth Stadium (60,000)	Ashton Turner	Adam Voges
Sydney Sixers	Sydney Cricket Ground (48,000); Coffs Harbour International Stadium (20,000)	Moises Henriques	Greg Shipperd
Sydney Thunder	Sydney Showground Stadium (22,000); Manuka Oval (16,000)	Jason Sangha	Trevor Bayliss

=== Squads ===
Teams	Playing squads
Adelaide Strikers	Wes Agar, Cameron Boyce, Alex Carey, Harry Conway, Colin de Grandhomme, Ryan Gibson, Travis Head (c), Adam Hose, Henry Hunt, Thomas Kelly, Rashid Khan, Chris Lynn, Harry Nielsen, Matt Short, Jake Weatherald, Henry Thorton, Peter Siddle, Ben Manenti
Brisbane Heat	Xavier Bartlett, James Bazley, Sam Billings, Max Bryant, Sam Hain, Sam Heazlett, Usman Khawaja (c), Matthew Kuhnemann, Marnus Labuschagne, Colin Munro, Michael Neser, Jimmy Peirson, Matthew Renshaw, Mark Steketee, Mitchell Swepson, Ross Whiteley, Jack Wildermuth, Spencer Johnson, Will Prestwidge
Hobart Hurricanes	Asif Ali, Faheem Ashraf, Tim David, Nathan Ellis, Caleb Jewell, Shadab Khan, Ben McDermott, Riley Meredith, Mitch Owen, Joel Paris, Wil Parker, D'Arcy Short, Matthew Wade, Billy Stanlake, Paddy Dooley, Chris Tremain, Iain Carlisle, Mac Wright, Zak Crawley, Jimmy Neesham
Melbourne Renegades	Zak Evans, Aaron Finch, Akeal Hosein, Jake Fraser-McGurk, Sam Harper, Mackenzie Harvey, Nic Maddinson (c), Shaun Marsh, Mujeeb ur Rahman, Kane Richardson, Peter Handscomb, Tom Rogers, Will Sutherland, Jon Wells, Jack Prestwidge, David Moody, Ruwantha Kellapotha, Marcus Harris, Andre Russell (first four matches only), Martin Guptill
Melbourne Stars	Joe Burns, Hilton Cartwright, Joe Clarke, Brody Couch, Nathan Coulter-Nile, Sam Elliott, Liam Hatcher, Clint Hinchliffe, Campbell Kellaway, Nick Larkin, Glenn Maxwell, Cam McClure, Tom O'Connell, Marcus Stoinis, Beau Webster, Trent Boult, Luke Wood, Adam Zampa (c), Tom Rogers
Perth Scorchers	Ashton Agar, Cameron Bancroft, Ashton Turner (c), Jason Behrendorff, Cooper Connolly, Faf du Plessis, Stephen Eskinazi, Cameron Green, Aaron Hardie, Peter Hatzoglou, Nick Hobson, Josh Inglis, Matt Kelly, Adam Lyth, Hamish McKenzie, Lance Morris, David Payne, Jhye Richardson
Sydney Sixers	Sean Abbott, Jackson Bird, Dan Christian, Ben Dwarshuis, Moises Henriques, Daniel Hughes, Hayden Kerr, Nathan Lyon, Izharulhaq Naveed, Chris Jordan, Steve O'Keefe, Kurtis Patterson, Josh Philippe, Jordan Silk, James Vince, Jack Edwards, Mickey Edwards, Steve Smith
Sydney Thunder	Oliver Davies, Brendan Doggett, Matthew Gilkes, Chris Green, Alex Hales, Baxter Holt, Nathan McAndrew, Alex Ross, Rilee Rossouw, Daniel Sams, Jason Sangha (c), Tanveer Sangha, David Warner, Fazalhaq Farooqi, Ben Cutting, Usman Qadir, Gurinder Sandhu

=== Visa-contracted players ===
Maximum of 3 visa-contracted players permitted in the matchday squad.

Club	Player 1	Player 2	Player 3	Replacement players
Adelaide Strikers	Rashid Khan	Colin de Grandhomme	Adam Hose	—
Brisbane Heat	Sam Billings	Colin Munro	Ross Whiteley	Sam Hain
Hobart Hurricanes	Shadab Khan (Note: Hobart Hurricanes announced that Khan would be replaced by Zak Crawley from 11 January 2023 while he takes part in Pakistan's ODI series against New Zealand)	Asif Ali	Faheem Ashraf	Zak Crawley; Jimmy Neesham
Melbourne Renegades	~~Liam Livingstone~~ (Note: Melbourne Renegades announced on 3 November 2022 that Livingstone would be replaced by Andre Russell for the first four matches of the season, while he takes part in England's three-match test series against Pakistan. However, on 22 November it was confirmed he had withdrawn from the tournament in full, citing his increased international workload)	Mujeeb Ur Rahman	Akeal Hosein	Ruwantha Kellapotha; Andre Russell; Martin Guptill
Melbourne Stars	Trent Boult	Joe Clarke	Luke Wood	—
Perth Scorchers	~~Laurie Evans~~ (Note: Perth Scorchers announced that Evans would be replaced by Faf du Plessis for the first 7 games after Evans tested positive after a routine anti-doping test)	~~Phil Salt~~ (Note: Pulled out on 2 December 2022 after suffering a grade 2 liguament injury to his shoulder.)	~~Tymal Mills~~	Faf du Plessis; Adam Lyth; David Payne
Sydney Sixers	Chris Jordan	James Vince	Izharulhaq Naveed	—
Sydney Thunder	~~David Willey~~ (Note: Pulled out on 15 November 2022.)	Alex Hales	Rilee Rossouw	Fazalhaq Farooqi Usman Qadir

== Draft ==
The 2022–23 season saw the inaugural international draft for the Big Bash League. It was held on 29 August 2022.

Table of international draft selections
Round	Pick	Player	Club	National team	Notes
1	1	Liam Livingstone	Melbourne Renegades	England	Withdrew from tournament due to international commitments on 22 November.
1	2	Trent Boult	Melbourne Stars	New Zealand	
1	3	Sam Billings	Brisbane Heat	England	
1	4	Chris Jordan	Sydney Sixers	England	
1	5	Rashid Khan	Adelaide Strikers	Afghanistan	Retention pick.
1	6	Passed	Perth Scorchers	—	
1	7	David Willey	Sydney Thunder	England	Withdrew from tournament for personal reasons on 15 November.
1	8	Shadab Khan	Hobart Hurricanes	Pakistan	
2	9	Mujeeb Ur Rahman	Melbourne Renegades	Afghanistan	
2	10	Joe Clarke	Melbourne Stars	England	
2	11	Colin Munro	Brisbane Heat	New Zealand	
2	12	Laurie Evans	Perth Scorchers	England	Retention pick; contract terminated on 22 November.
2	13	James Vince	Sydney Sixers	England	
2	14	Colin de Grandhomme	Adelaide Strikers	New Zealand	
2	15	Alex Hales	Sydney Thunder	England	
2	16	Asif Ali	Hobart Hurricanes	Pakistan	
3	17	Faheem Ashraf	Hobart Hurricanes	Pakistan	
3	18	Rilee Rossouw	Sydney Thunder	South Africa	
3	19	Phil Salt	Perth Scorchers	England	Withdrew from tournament due to injury on 2 December.
3	20	Adam Hose	Adelaide Strikers	England	
3	21	Passed	Sydney Sixers	—	
3	22	Passed	Brisbane Heat	—	
3	23	Luke Wood	Melbourne Stars	England	
3	24	Passed	Melbourne Renegades	—	
4	25	Akeal Hosein	Melbourne Renegades	West Indies	
4	26	Passed	Melbourne Stars	—	
4	27	Ross Whiteley	Brisbane Heat	England	
4	28	Izharulhaq Naveed	Sydney Sixers	Afghanistan	
4	29	Passed	Adelaide Strikers	—	
4	30	Tymal Mills	Perth Scorchers	England	Withdrew from tournament for personal reasons on 15 December.
4	31	Passed	Sydney Thunder	—	
4	32	Passed	Hobart Hurricanes	—	

== Venues ==
A total of seventeen venues have been selected to be used for the tournament, with North Sydney Oval No. 1, Lavington Sports Ground in Albury, and Cazalys Stadium in Cairns each hosting their first BBL match.

Adelaide	Albury	Brisbane	Cairns	Canberra
Adelaide Oval	Lavington Sports Ground	The Gabba	Cazalys Stadium	Manuka Oval
Capacity: 53,583	Capacity: 12,000	Capacity: 42,000	Capacity: 13,500	Capacity: 14,000
Matches: 7	Matches: 1	Matches: 5	Matches: 1	Matches: 2
Team: Adelaide Strikers	Team: Sydney Thunder	Team: Brisbane Heat	Team: Brisbane Heat	Team: Sydney Thunder
Coffs Harbour	2022–23 Big Bash League season is located in Australia			Geelong
Coffs Harbour International Stadium	2022–23 Big Bash League season is located in Australia			Kardinia Park
Capacity: 20,000	2022–23 Big Bash League season is located in Australia			Capacity: 26,000
Matches: 1	2022–23 Big Bash League season is located in Australia			Matches: 2
Team: Sydney Sixers	2022–23 Big Bash League season is located in Australia			Team: Melbourne Renegades
Gold Coast	2022–23 Big Bash League season is located in Australia			Hobart
Carrara Stadium	2022–23 Big Bash League season is located in Australia			Bellerive Oval
Capacity: 25,000	2022–23 Big Bash League season is located in Australia			Capacity: 19,500
Matches: 1	2022–23 Big Bash League season is located in Australia			Matches: 5
Team: Brisbane Heat	2022–23 Big Bash League season is located in Australia			Team: Hobart Hurricanes
Launceston	Melbourne			Perth
York Park	Docklands Stadium	Melbourne Cricket Ground	Junction Oval	Perth Stadium
Capacity: 16,000	Capacity: 53,359	Capacity: 100,024	Capacity: 7,000	Capacity: 60,000
Matches: 2	Matches: 5	Matches: 6	Matches: 1	Matches: 7
Team: Hobart Hurricanes	Team: Melbourne Renegades	Team: Melbourne Stars	Team: Melbourne Stars	Team: Perth Scorchers
A small stand to the left and a two tier stand and scoreboard filled with people in the backdrop of an oval grass playing surface scattered with players. Spectators stand in the foreground.				
	Sydney			
	North Sydney Oval	Sydney Showground Stadium	Sydney Cricket Ground	
	Capacity: 19,000	Capacity: 22,000	Capacity: 48,000	
	Matches: 1	Matches: 4	Matches: 5	
	Team: Sydney Sixers	Team: Sydney Thunder	Team: Sydney Sixers	

== Pre-season ==
Pre-season matches

13 August 2022

Melbourne Renegades Academy; 7/158 (20 overs)	v	Melbourne Stars Academy; 5/159 (19.4 overs)

Melbourne Stars Academy won by 5 wickets
Marrara Cricket Ground, Darwin

15 August 2022

Melbourne Renegades Academy; 108 (17.4 overs)	v	Cricket Australia XI; 4/109 (18.3 overs)

Cricket Australia XI won by 6 wickets
Marrara Cricket Ground, Darwin

17 August 2022

Melbourne Renegades Academy; 8/160 (20 overs)	v	Northern Territory; 5/147 (20 overs)

Melbourne Renegades Academy won by 13 runs
Marrara Cricket Ground, Darwin

20 August 2022

Papua New Guinea; 6/152 (20 overs)	v	Melbourne Renegades Academy; 5/155 (16.2 overs)

Melbourne Renegades Academy won by 5 wickets
Marrara Cricket Ground, Darwin

5 October 2022

Melbourne Renegades Academy	v	Scotland

No result
HP Barr Reserve, Wangaratta

6 October 2022

Melbourne Renegades Academy	v	Namibia

No result
HP Barr Reserve, Wangaratta

9 December 2022

Melbourne Stars; 7/220 (20 overs)	v	Melbourne Renegades; 2/221 (18.5 overs)

Melbourne Renegades won by 8 wickets
Junction Oval, Melbourne

11 December 2022

Melbourne Renegades Academy; 4/155 (20 overs)	v	Melbourne Stars Academy

No result
Chirnside Park, Melbourne

== Teams and Standings ==
=== Points table ===
Pos	Team	Pld	W	L	NR	Pts	NRR	Qualification
1	Perth Scorchers (C)	14	11	3	0	22	1.205	Advanced to play-off phase
2	Sydney Sixers	14	10	3	1	21	0.846	Advanced to play-off phase
3	Melbourne Renegades	14	7	7	0	14	−0.027	Advanced to play-off phase
4	Sydney Thunder	14	7	7	0	14	−0.716	Advanced to play-off phase
5	Brisbane Heat	14	6	7	1	13	−0.483	Advanced to play-off phase
6	Hobart Hurricanes	14	6	8	0	12	−0.340	
7	Adelaide Strikers	14	5	9	0	10	−0.151	
8	Melbourne Stars	14	3	11	0	6	−0.287	

Source: ESPNcricinfo
(C) Champions

=== Win–loss table ===
A summary of results for each team's fourteen regular season matches, plus finals where applicable, in chronological order. A team's opponent for any given match is listed above the margin of victory or defeat.

Team	1	2	3	4	5	6	7	8	9	10	11	12	13	14	E	Q	K	C	F	Pos.
Adelaide Strikers (ADS)	SYS; 51 runs	SYT; 124 runs	SYT; 6 wickets	BRH; 6 runs	PRS; 3 wickets	MLS; 8 runs	HBH; 7 wickets	HBH; 7 wickets	MLR; 20 Runs	MLS; 9 wickets	BRH; 17 runs	SYS; 59 runs	PRS; 7 wickets	MLR; 6 wickets	X	X	X	X	X	7th (DNQ)
Brisbane Heat (BRH)	MLR; 22 runs	MLR; 4 wickets	ADS; 6 runs	SYT; 10 wickets	SYT; 11 runs	SYS; 15 runs	SYS; No Result	PRS; 7 wickets	PRS; 8 wickets	ADS; 17 runs	MLS; 3 wickets	HBH; 12 runs	MLS; 4 runs	HBH; 2 runs	SYT; 8 runs	→	MLR; 7 wickets	SYS; 4 wickets	PRS; 5 wickets	2nd (RU)
Hobart Hurricanes (HBH)	MLS; 38 runs	PRS; 8 runs	SYS; 6 runs	MLR; 8 runs	SYT; 62 runs	ADS; 7 wickets	ADS; 7 wickets	MLR; 6 wickets	MLS; 2 wickets	SYT; 5 wickets	PRS; 7 wickets	BRH; 12 runs	SYS; 24 runs	BRH; 2 runs	X	X	X	X	X	6th (DNQ)
Melbourne Renegades (MLR)	BRH; 22 runs	SYT; 4 wickets	BRH; 4 wickets	HBH; 8 runs	SYS; 34 runs	SYS; 6 wickets	PRS; 5 wickets	MLS; 33 runs	HBH; 6 wickets	ADS; 20 runs	MLS; 6 runs	SYT; 8 wickets	PRS; 10 runs	ADS; 6 wickets	→	→	BRH; 7 wickets	X	X	4th (KM)
Melbourne Stars (MLS)	SYT; 1 wicket	HBH; 38 runs	PRS; 61 runs	SYS; 7 wickets	PRS; 6 wickets	ADS; 8 runs	MLR; 33 runs	SYS; 6 wickets	HBH; 2 wickets	ADS; 9 wickets	MLR; 6 runs	BRH; 3 wickets	BRH; 4 runs	SYT; 3 wickets	X	X	X	X	X	8th (DNQ)
Perth Scorchers (PRS)	SYS; 38 runs	HBH; 8 runs	MLS; 61 runs	ADS; 3 wickets	MLS; 6 wickets	MLR; 5 wickets	SYT; 6 wickets	BRH; 7 wickets	BRH; 8 wickets	SYT; 9 wickets	SYS; 6 runs	HBH; 7 wickets	ADS; 7 wickets	MLR; 10 runs	→	SYS; 7 wickets	→	→	BRH; 5 wickets	1st (C)
Sydney Sixers (SYS)	ADS; 51 runs	PRS; 38 runs	HBH; 6 runs	MLS; 7 wickets	MLR; 34 runs	MLR; 6 wickets	BRH; 15 runs	BRH; No Result	MLS; 6 wickets	SYT; 7 wickets	PRS; 6 runs	ADS; 59 runs	SYT; 125 runs	HBH; 24 runs	→	PRS; 7 wickets	→	BRH; 4 wickets	X	3rd (CM)
Sydney Thunder (SYT)	MLS; 1 wicket	ADS; 124 runs	MLR; 4 wickets	ADS; 6 wickets	BRH; 10 wickets	BRH; 11 runs	HBH; 62 runs	PRS; 6 wickets	SYS; 7 wickets	PRS; 9 wickets	HBH; 5 wickets	MLR; 8 wickets	SYS; 125 runs	MLS; 3 wickets	BRH; 8 runs	X	X	X	X	5th (EM)

Team's results→	Won	Lost	N/R

As of 4 February 2023

=== League progression ===
Team	Group matches														Playoffs		
Team	1	2	3	4	5	6	7	8	9	10	11	12	13	14	Q/K	C	F
Adelaide Strikers	2	4	6	6	6	6	6	8	10	10	10	10	10	10			
Brisbane Heat	0	0	2	2	2	4	5	5	5	7	9	11	13	13	W	W	W
Hobart Hurricanes	0	2	2	4	4	6	6	6	8	10	10	10	10	12			
Melbourne Renegades	2	4	6	6	6	6	6	8	10	10	12	12	12	14		L	
Melbourne Stars	0	2	2	2	2	4	4	4	4	6	6	6	6	6			
Perth Scorchers	2	2	4	6	8	10	10	12	14	16	16	18	20	22	W		
Sydney Sixers	0	0	2	4	6	8	8	9	11	13	15	17	19	21	L		L
Sydney Thunder	2	2	2	2	4	6	8	10	10	10	10	12	12	14	L		

Win	Loss	No result

- Note: The total points at the end of each group match are listed.
- Note: Click on the points (group matches) or W/L (playoffs) to see the match summary.

=== Match summary ===
Visitor team →	ADS	BRH	HBH	MLR	MLS	PRS	SYS	SYT
Home team ↓	ADS	BRH	HBH	MLR	MLS	PRS	SYS	SYT
Adelaide Strikers		Heat; 17 runs	Strikers; 7 wickets	Strikers; 20 runs	Stars; 8 runs	Scorchers; 7 wickets	Strikers; 51 runs	Strikers; 6 wickets
Brisbane Heat	Heat; 6 runs		Heat; 12 runs	Renegades; 22 runs	Heat; 4 runs	Scorchers; 8 wickets	Heat; 15 runs	Thunder; 11 runs
Hobart Hurricanes	Hurricanes; 7 wickets	Hurricanes; 2 runs		Hurricanes; 8 runs	Hurricanes; 2 wickets	Hurricanes; 8 runs	Sixers; 24 runs	Hurricanes; 5 wickets
Melbourne Renegades	Renegades; 6 wickets	Renegades; 4 wickets	Renegades; 6 wickets		Renegades; 6 runs	Scorchers; 5 wickets	Sixers; 6 wickets	Renegades; 4 wickets
Melbourne Stars	Stars; 9 wickets	Heat; 3 wickets	Stars; 38 runs	Renegades; 33 runs		Scorchers; 61 runs	Sixers; 6 wickets	Thunder; 3 wickets
Perth Scorchers	Scorchers; 3 wickets	Scorchers; 7 wickets	Scorchers; 7 wickets	Scorchers; 10 runs	Scorchers; 6 wickets		Scorchers; 38 runs	Thunder; 6 wickets
Sydney Sixers	Sixers; 59 runs	Match abandoned	Sixers; 6 runs	Sixers; 34 runs	Sixers; 7 wickets	Sixers; 6 runs		Sixers; 125 runs
Sydney Thunder	Strikers; 124 runs	Thunder; 10 wickets	Thunder; 62 runs	Thunder; 8 wickets	Thunder; 1 wicket	Scorchers; 9 wickets	Sixers; 7 wickets	

Home team won	Visitor team won

- Note: Results listed are according to the home (horizontal) and visitor (vertical) teams.
- Note: Click on a result to see a summary of the match.

== League stage ==
On 14 July 2022, Cricket Australia confirmed the full schedule for the tournament.

=== Week 1 ===
Match 1
13 December 2022
19:15 (N)
Scorecard

Melbourne Stars; 8/122 (20 overs)	v	Sydney Thunder (H); 9/123 (20 overs)
Nick Larkin 25 (26); Fazalhaq Farooqi 2/20 (4 overs)		Alex Ross 28 (27); Nathan Coulter-Nile 3/19 (4 overs)

Sydney Thunder won by 1 wicket
Manuka Oval, Canberra
Attendance: 6,221
Umpires: Gerard Abood and Paul Wilson
Player of the match: Gurinder Sandhu (Sydney Thunder)

- Sydney Thunder won the toss and elected to field.

Match 2
14 December 2022
18:45 (N)
Scorecard

(H) Adelaide Strikers; 6/184 (20 overs)	v	Sydney Sixers; 7/133 (20 overs)
Matthew Short 84 (53); Sean Abbott 3/37 (4 overs)		Jordan Silk 36 (25); Henry Thornton 4/20 (4 overs)

Adelaide Strikers won by 51 runs
Adelaide Oval, Adelaide
Attendance: 12,621
Umpires: Bruce Oxenford and Eloise Sheridan
Player of the match: Matthew Short (Adelaide Strikers)

- Adelaide Strikers won the toss and elected to bat.

Match 3
15 December 2022
18:15 (N)
Scorecard

Melbourne Renegades; 7/166 (20 overs)	v	Brisbane Heat (H); 6/144 (20 overs)
Nic Maddinson 87 (49); Matthew Kuhnemann 3/32 (4 overs)		Jimmy Peirson 43 (30); Akeal Hosein 3/15 (4 overs)

Melbourne Renegades won by 22 runs
Cazalys Stadium, Cairns
Attendance: 6,708
Umpires: Phillip Gillespie and Donovan Koch
Player of the match: Nic Maddinson (Melbourne Renegades)

- Brisbane Heat won the toss and elected to field.
- Josh Brown (Brisbane Heat) made his T20 debut.

Match 4
16 December 2022
17:05 (D/N)
Scorecard

(H) Melbourne Stars; 5/183 (20 overs)	v	Hobart Hurricanes; 9/145 (20 overs)
Joe Clarke 101* (66); Riley Meredith 2/38 (4 overs)		Matthew Wade 35 (35); Luke Wood 3/25 (4 overs)

Melbourne Stars won by 38 runs
Melbourne Cricket Ground, Melbourne
Attendance: 9,142
Umpires: Michael Graham-Smith and Nathan Johnstone
Player of the match: Joe Clarke (Melbourne Stars)

- Hobart Hurricanes won the toss and elected to field.
- Campbell Kellaway (Melbourne Stars) made his T20 debut.

Match 5
16 December 2022
20:15 (N)
Scorecard

Adelaide Strikers; 9/139 (20 overs)	v	Sydney Thunder (H); 15 (5.5 overs)
Chris Lynn 36 (27); Fazalhaq Farooqi 3/20 (4 overs)		Brendan Doggett 4 (2); Henry Thornton 5/3 (2.5 overs)

Adelaide Strikers won by 124 runs
Sydney Showground Stadium, Sydney
Attendance: 6,103
Umpires: Simon Lightbody and Sam Nogajski
Player of the match: Henry Thornton (Adelaide Strikers)

- Adelaide Strikers won the toss and elected to bat.
- Thunder's 15 all out is the lowest score in a completed innings in a men's professional T20 until it was surpassed by the Isle of Man being bowled out for 10 against Spain in February 2023. At 35 balls, it was also the shortest completed innings in all men's professional T20s.

Match 6
17 December 2022
16:05 (D/N)
Scorecard

(H) Perth Scorchers; 9/155 (20 overs)	v	Sydney Sixers; 117 (20 overs)
Aaron Hardie 55 (32); Jackson Bird 3/26 (4 overs)		Hayden Kerr 42 (35); Jhye Richardson 4/9 (4 overs)

Perth Scorchers won by 38 runs
Perth Stadium, Perth
Attendance: 21,042
Umpires: Shawn Craig and Bruce Oxenford
Player of the match: Jhye Richardson (Perth Scorchers)

- Perth Scorchers won the toss and elected to bat

Match 7
18 December 2022
19:15 (N)
Scorecard

Sydney Thunder; 6/174 (20 overs)	v	Melbourne Renegades (H); 6/175 (19.5 overs)
Rilee Rossouw 53 (38); Tom Rogers 2/41 (4 overs)		Aaron Finch 70* (43); Daniel Sams 3/33 (4 overs)

Melbourne Renegades won by 4 wickets
Docklands Stadium, Melbourne
Attendance: 7,087
Umpires: Sam Nogajski and Ben Treloar
Player of the match: Aaron Finch (Melbourne Renegades)

- Sydney Thunder won the toss and elected to bat.

Match 8
19 December 2022
19:15 (N)
Scorecard

(H) Hobart Hurricanes; 8/172 (20 overs)	v	Perth Scorchers; 8/164 (20 overs)
Matthew Wade 51 (29); Jhye Richardson 3/26 (4 overs)		Josh Inglis 62 (37); Patrick Dooley 4/16 (4 overs)

Hobart Hurricanes won by 8 runs
York Park, Launceston
Attendance: 5,342
Umpires: Greg Davidson and Michael Graham-Smith
Player of the match: Patrick Dooley (Hobart Hurricanes)

- Hobart Hurricanes won the toss and elected to bat.

=== Week 2 ===
Match 9
20 December 2022
18:45 (N)
Scorecard

Sydney Thunder; 5/150 (20 overs)	v	Adelaide Strikers (H); 4/151 (18.4 overs)
Alex Hales 68 (50); Henry Thornton 2/18 (3 overs)		Matthew Short 65 (44); Nathan McAndrew 2/25 (4 overs)

Adelaide Strikers won by 6 wickets
Adelaide Oval, Adelaide
Attendance: 17,134
Umpires: Gerard Abood and Shawn Craig
Player of the match: Matthew Short (Adelaide Strikers)

- Sydney Thunder won the toss and elected to bat.

Match 10
21 December 2022
19:15 (N)
Scorecard

Brisbane Heat; 8/137 (20 overs)	v	Melbourne Renegades (H); 6/139 (19.2 overs)
Jimmy Peirson 45* (30); Tom Rogers 4/23 (4 overs)		Andre Russell 57 (42); Michael Neser 4/32 (4 overs)

Melbourne Renegades won by 4 wickets
Kardinia Park, Geelong
Attendance: 6,892
Umpires: Simon Lightbody and David Taylor
Player of the match: Andre Russell (Melbourne Renegades)

- Brisbane Heat won the toss and elected to bat.
- Michael Neser (Brisbane Heat) took the 9th BBL hatrick.

Match 11
22 December 2022
19:15 (N)
Scorecard

(H) Sydney Sixers; 6/137 (14 overs)	v	Hobart Hurricanes; 7/131 (14 overs)
Josh Philippe 43 (21); Patrick Dooley 2/19 (3 overs)		Asif Ali 41 (13); Sean Abbott 2/32 (3 overs)

Sydney Sixers won by 6 runs
Sydney Cricket Ground, Sydney
Attendance: 13,432
Umpires: Michael Graham-Smith and Claire Polosak
Player of the match: Josh Philippe (Sydney Sixers)

- Sydney Sixers won the toss and elected to bat.
- The match was reduced to 14 overs per side due to rain.

Match 12
23 December 2022
15:30
Scorecard

Perth Scorchers; 7/229 (20 overs)	v	Melbourne Stars (H); 8/168 (20 overs)
Josh Inglis 74 (33); Luke Wood 5/50 (4 overs)		Beau Webster 43 (32); Jason Behrendorff 3/32 (4 overs)

Perth Scorchers won by 61 runs
Junction Oval, Melbourne
Attendance: 3,697
Umpires: Simon Lightbody and Paul Wilson
Player of the match: Josh Inglis (Perth Scorchers)

- Perth Scorchers won the toss and elected to bat.

Match 13
23 December 2022
18:00 (N)
Scorecard

(H) Brisbane Heat; 9/166 (20 overs)	v	Adelaide Strikers; 9/160 (20 overs)
Sam Billings 79 (48); Matt Short 3/14 (3 overs)		Thomas Kelly 43 (33); Mark Steketee 4/34 (4 overs)

Brisbane Heat won by 6 runs
The Gabba, Brisbane
Attendance: 17,283
Umpires: Greg Davidson and Sharad Patel
Player of the match: Sam Billings (Brisbane Heat)

- Brisbane Heat won the toss and elected to bat.

Match 14
24 December 2022
15:30
Scorecard

(H) Hobart Hurricanes; 122 (18 overs)	v	Melbourne Renegades; 114 (19.2 overs)
James Neesham 28 (19); David Moody 3/16 (4 overs)		Will Sutherland 40 (29); Riley Meredith 3/12 (4 overs)

Hobart Hurricanes won by 8 runs
Bellerive Oval, Hobart
Attendance: 9,128
Umpires: Shawn Craig and Sam Nogajski
Player of the match: Riley Meredith (Hobart Hurricanes)

- Hobart Hurricanes won the toss and elected to bat.

Match 15
26 December 2022
18:05 (N)
Scorecard

Melbourne Stars; 5/150 (20 overs)	v	Sydney Sixers (H); 3/151 (19.1 overs)
Beau Webster 78 (51); Hayden Kerr 2/26 (4 overs)		Moises Henriques 52* (32); Adam Zampa 1/21 (4 overs)

Sydney Sixers won by 7 wickets
Sydney Cricket Ground, Sydney
Attendance: 13,236
Umpires: Greg Davidson and Ben Treloar
Player of the match: Moises Henriques (Sydney Sixers)

- Sydney Sixers won the toss and elected to field.

Match 16
26 December 2022
18:15 (N)
Scorecard

Adelaide Strikers; 7/133 (20 overs)	v	Perth Scorchers (H); 7/136 (19.1 overs)
Chris Lynn 35 (34); Andrew Tye 3/30 (4 overs)		Ashton Turner 48* (38); Matt Short 2/11 (2 overs)

Perth Scorchers won by 3 wickets
Perth Stadium, Perth
Attendance: 26,211
Umpires: Gerard Abood and Nathan Johnstone
Player of the match: Ashton Turner (Perth Scorchers)

- Adelaide Strikers won the toss and elected to bat.

=== Week 3 ===
Match 17
27 December 2022
19:15 (N)
Scorecard

Brisbane Heat; 6/121 (20 overs)	v	Sydney Thunder (H); 0/124 (11.4 overs)
Colin Munro 43 (47); Chris Green 2/14 (4 overs)		Alex Hales 59* (36)

Sydney Thunder won by 10 wickets
Sydney Showground Stadium, Sydney
Attendance: 8,534
Umpires: Donovan Koch and Michael Graham-Smith
Player of the match: Matthew Gilkes (Sydney Thunder)

- Brisbane Heat won the toss and elected to bat.

Match 18
28 December 2022
19:15 (N)
Scorecard

(H) Sydney Sixers; 8/149 (20 overs)	v	Melbourne Renegades; 115 (19 overs)
Josh Philippe 55 (40); Mujeeb Ur Rahman 3/29 (4 overs)		Aaron Finch 36 (35); Ben Dwarshuis 4/17 (4 overs)

Sydney Sixers won by 34 runs
Sydney Cricket Ground, Sydney
Attendance: 16,208
Umpires: Sharad Patel and Paul Wilson
Player of the match: Ben Dwarshuis (Sydney Sixers)

- Melbourne Renegades won the toss and elected to field.

Match 19
29 December 2022
17:05 (D/N)
Scorecard

Sydney Thunder; 6/182 (20 overs)	v	Brisbane Heat (H); 9/171 (20 overs)
Rilee Rossouw 39 (35); James Bazley 4/22 (4 overs)		Colin Munro 98 (53); Nathan McAndrew 4/32 (4 overs)

Sydney Thunder won by 11 runs
Carrara Stadium, Gold Coast
Attendance: 14,575
Umpires: Bruce Oxenford and Simon Lightbody
Player of the match: Daniel Sams (Sydney Thunders)

- Brisbane Heat won the toss and elected to field.

Match 20
29 December 2022
18:15 (N)
Scorecard

Melbourne Stars; 135 (20 overs)	v	Perth Scorchers (H); 4/136 (17.3 overs)
Hilton Cartwright 36 (32); Jhye Richardson 4/25 (4 overs)		Ashton Turner 53 (26); Luke Wood 2/29 (3.3 overs)

Perth Scorhers won by 6 wickets
Perth Stadium, Perth
Attendance: 27,752
Umpires: Ben Treloar and Sam Nogajski
Player of the match: Jhye Richardson (Perth Scorchers)

- Melbourne Stars won the toss and elected to bat

Match 21
30 December 2022
18:30 (N)
Scorecard

(H) Melbourne Renegades; 7/124 (20 overs)	v	Sydney Sixers; 4/126 (17.5 overs)
Shaun Marsh 35 (29); Chris Jordan 2/25 (4 overs); Hayden Kerr 2/25 (4 overs)		James Vince 39 (31); Akeal Hosein 2/24 (4 overs)

Sydney Sixers won by 6 wickets
Kardinia Park, Geelong
Attendance: 12,336
Umpires: Gerard Abood and Stephen Dionysius
Player of the match: Chris Jordan (Sydney Sixers)

- Melbourne Renegades won the toss and elected to bat.

Match 22
31 December 2022
15:30
Scorecard

(H) Sydney Thunder; 6/228 (20 overs)	v	Hobart Hurricanes; 166 (17 overs)
Alex Hales 77 (45); Nathan Ellis 4/37 (4 overs)		Matthew Wade 67 (30); Brendan Doggett 4/35 (4 overs)

Sydney Thunder won by 62 runs
Lavington Sports Ground, Albury
Attendance: 10,171
Umpires: Greg Davidson and Paul Wilson
Player of the match: Oliver Davies (Sydney Thunder)

- Hobart Hurricanes won the toss and elected to field.

Match 23
31 December 2022
18:30 (N)
Scorecard

Melbourne Stars; 7/186 (20 overs)	v	Adelaide Strikers (H); 5/178 (20 overs)
Marcus Stoinis 74 (35); Wes Agar 3/27 (4 overs)		Adam Hose 56* (41); Liam Hatcher 2/29 (4 overs)

Melbourne Stars won by 8 runs
Adelaide Oval, Adelaide
Attendance: 40,373
Umpires: Ben Treloar and Simon Lightbody
Player of the match: Marcus Stoinis (Melbourne Stars)

- Melbourne Stars won the toss and elected to bat.

Match 24
1 January 2023
13:40
Scorecard

(H) Melbourne Renegades; 6/155 (20 overs)	v	Perth Scorchers; 5/156 (19.4 overs)
Aaron Finch 65 (48); Andrew Tye 3/32 (4 overs)		Josh Inglis 47 (34); Kane Richardson 2/21 (4 overs)

Perth Scorchers won by 5 wickets
Docklands Stadium, Melbourne
Attendance: 9,027
Umpires: Bruce Oxenford and Shawn Craig
Player of the match: Josh Inglis (Perth Scorchers)

- Melbourne Renegades won the toss and elected to bat.

Match 25
1 January 2023
18:15 (N)
Scorecard

(H) Brisbane Heat; 5/224 (20 overs)	v	Sydney Sixers; 209 (20 overs)
Nathan McSweeney 84 (51); Dan Christian 1/5 (1 over)		Jordan Silk 41 (23); Michael Neser 3/41 (4 overs)

Brisbane Heat won by 15 runs
The Gabba, Brisbane
Attendance: 23,689
Umpires: Donovan Koch and Nathan Johnstone
Player of the match: Josh Brown (Brisbane Heat)

- Brisbane Heat won the toss and elected to bat.

Match 26
2 January 2023
19:15 (N)
Scorecard

Adelaide Strikers; 6/177 (20 overs)	v	Hobart Hurricanes (H); 3/178 (17.2 overs)
Chris Lynn 87 (58); Nathan Ellis 2/39 (4 overs)		Caleb Jewell 54 (28); Peter Siddle 1/21 (4 overs)

Hobart Hurricanes won by 7 wickets
Bellerive Oval, Hobart
Attendance: 6,113
Umpires: Sam Nogajski and Michael Graham-Smith
Player of the match: Caleb Jewell (Hobart Hurricanes)

- Adelaide Strikers won the toss and elected to bat.

=== Week 4 ===
Match 27
3 January 2023
19:15 (N)
Scorecard

Melbourne Renegades; 7/141 (20 overs)	v	Melbourne Stars (H); 9/108 (20 overs)
Mackenzie Harvey 32* (23); Trent Boult 2/23 (4 overs)		Nick Larkin 48* (40); Tom Rogers 5/16 (4 overs)

Melbourne Renegades won by 33 runs
Melbourne Cricket Ground, Melbourne
Attendance: 38,564
Umpires: Gerard Abood and Phillip Gillespie
Player of the match: Tom Rogers (Melbourne Renegades)

- Melbourne Stars won the toss and elected to field.

Match 28
4 January 2023
18:05 (N)
Scorecard

Brisbane Heat; 6/147 (13 overs)	v	Sydney Sixers (H)
Michael Neser 45* (18); Steve O'Keefe 3/26 (3 overs)

No result
North Sydney Oval, Sydney
Attendance: 8,384
Umpires: Sam Nogajski and Troy Penman

- Sydney Sixers won the toss and elected to field.
- The match was reduced to 13 overs per side due to rain.
- No further play was possible due to rain.

Match 29
4 January 2023
18:15 (N)
Scorecard

(H) Perth Scorchers; 9/142 (20 overs)	v	Sydney Thunder; 4/143 (17 overs)
Ashton Turner 61 (37); Nathan McAndrew 3/29 (4 overs)		Oliver Davies 58 (47); Jhye Richardson 2/36 (3.4 overs)

Sydney Thunder won by 6 wickets
Perth Stadium, Perth
Attendance: 24,182
Umpires: Michael Johnstone and Michael Graham-Smith
Player of the match: Oliver Davies (Sydney Thunder)

- Perth Scorchers won the toss and elected to bat.
- Joel Davies (Sydney Thunder) made his T20 debut.

Match 30
5 January 2023
18:45 (N)
Scorecard

Hobart Hurricanes; 4/229 (20 overs)	v	Adelaide Strikers (H); 3/230 (19.3 overs)
Ben McDermott 57 (30); Colin de Grandhomme 2/45 (4 overs)		Matt Short 100* (59); Patrick Dooley 2/25 (4 overs)

Adelaide Strikers won by 7 wickets
Adelaide Oval, Adelaide
Attendance: 21,727
Umpires: Bruce Oxenford and Paul Wilson
Player of the match: Matt Short (Adelaide Strikers)

- Adelaide Strikers won the toss and elected to field.

Match 31
6 January 2023
18:30 (N)
Scorecard

(H) Melbourne Stars; 5/173 (20 overs)	v	Sydney Sixers; 4/176 (19.5 overs)
Marcus Stoinis 52 (28); Sean Abbott 3/31 (4 overs)		James Vince 91* (59); Nathan Coulter-Nile 1/20 (4 overs)

Sydney Sixers won by 6 wickets
Melbourne Cricket Ground, Melbourne
Attendance: 17,137
Umpires: Shawn Craig and Michael Graham-Smith
Player of the match: James Vince (Sydney Sixers)

- Sydney Sixers won the toss and elected to field.

Match 32
7 January 2023
18:05 (N)
Scorecard

Hobart Hurricanes; 8/162 (20 overs)	v	Melbourne Renegades (H); 4/164 (18.1 overs)
Caleb Jewell 28 (17); Kane Richardson 2/20 (4 overs)		Sam Harper 89 (48); Nathan Ellis 1/17 (3.1 overs)

Melbourne Renegades won by 6 wickets
Docklands Stadium, Melbourne
Attendance: 12,514
Umpires: Gerard Abood and Nathan Johnstone
Player of the match: Sam Harper (Melbourne Renegades)

- Melbourne Renegades won the toss and elected to field.

Match 33
7 January 2023
18:15 (N)
Scorecard

Brisbane Heat; 9/171 (20 overs)	v	Perth Scorchers (H); 3/173 (16.3 overs)
Colin Munro 45 (26); Andrew Tye 3/37 (4 overs)		Cameron Bancroft 76* (48); Mark Steketee 1/35 (2.3 overs)

Perth Scorchers won by 7 wickets
Perth Stadium, Perth
Attendance: 28,029
Umpires: Ben Treloar and Simon Lightbody
Player of the match: Cameron Bancroft (Perth Scorchers)

- Perth Scorchers won the toss and elected to field
- Cooper Connolly (Perth Scorchers) made his T20 debut.

Match 34
8 January 2023
19:15 (N)
Scorecard

(H) Sydney Thunder; 8/133 (20 overs)	v	Sydney Sixers; 3/134 (16.2 overs)
Sam Whiteman 42 (34); Sean Abbott 3/9 (4 overs)		Jordan Silk 59* (42); Chris Green 2/29 (4 overs)

Sydney Sixers won by 7 wickets
Sydney Showground Stadium, Sydney
Attendance: 20,864
Umpires: Shawn Craig and Phillip Gillespie
Player of the match: Sean Abbott (Sydney Sixers)

- Sydney Sixers won the toss and elected to field

Match 35
9 January 2023
19:15 (N)
Scorecard

Melbourne Stars; 7/131 (20 overs)	v	Hobart Hurricanes (H); 8/133 (17.4 overs)
Hilton Cartwright 57 (47); Nathan Ellis 2/12 (4 overs)		Caleb Jewell 70 (44); Liam Hatcher 3/25 (4 overs)

Hobart Hurricanes won by 2 wickets
Bellerive Oval, Hobart
Attendance: 7,003
Umpires: Ben Treloar and Nathan Johnstone
Player of the match: Nathan Ellis (Hobart Hurricanes)

- Hobart Hurricanes won the toss and elected to field

=== Week 5 ===
Match 36
10 January 2023
19:10 (N)
Scorecard

(H) Adelaide Strikers; 4/202 (20 overs)	v	Melbourne Renegades; 6/182 (20 overs)
Chris Lynn 69* (37); Ruwantha Kellepotha 2/32 (4 overs)		Sam Harper 63 (36); Matt Short 2/26 (4 overs); Wes Agar 2/26 (4 overs)

Adelaide Strikers won by 20 runs
Adelaide Oval, Adelaide
Attendance: 21,345
Umpires: Claire Polosak and Shawn Craig
Player of the match: Chris Lynn (Adelaide Strikers)

- Melbourne Renegades won the toss and elected to field
- Ruwantha Kellepotha (Melbourne Renegades) made his T20 debut.

Match 37
11 January 2023
18:40 (N)
Scorecard

(H) Brisbane Heat; 6/155 (20 overs)	v	Perth Scorchers; 2/157 (16.2 overs)
Max Bryant 36 (27); Jason Behrendorff 3/21 (4 overs)		Josh Inglis 67* (35); Xavier Bartlett 1/31 (3 overs)

Perth Scorchers won by 8 wickets
The Gabba, Brisbane
Attendance: 16,816
Umpires: Eloise Sheridan and Michael Graham-Smith
Player of the match: Jason Behrendorff (Perth Scorchers)

- Perth Scorchers won the toss and elected to field.
- Spencer Johnson (Brisbane Heat) made his T20 debut.

Match 38
12 January 2023
19:15 (N)
Scorecard

Adelaide Strikers; 108 (19.2 overs)	v	Melbourne Stars (H); 1/109 (14.3 overs)
Harry Nielsen 40 (33); Nathan Coulter-Nile 3/17 (4 overs)		Tom Rogers 51* (45)

Melbourne Stars won by 9 wickets
Melbourne Cricket Ground, Melbourne
Attendance: 16,224
Umpires: Donovan Koch and David Taylor
Player of the match: Liam Hatcher (Melbourne Stars)

- Melbourne Stars won the toss and elected to field.

Match 39
13 January 2023
18:30 (N)
Scorecard

(H) Sydney Thunder; 111 (19 overs)	v	Perth Scorchers; 1/112 (12.5 overs)
Oliver Davies 52 (36); Andrew Tye 3/27 (4 overs)		Cameron Bancroft 55* (40); Nathan McAndrew 1/17 (3 overs)

Perth Scorchers won by 9 wickets
Sydney Showground Stadium, Sydney
Attendance: 11,076
Umpires: Simon Lightbody and Paul Wilson
Player of the match: Andrew Tye (Perth Scorchers)

- Perth Scorchers won the toss and elected to field.

Match 40
14 January 2023
15:30
Scorecard

Brisbane Heat; 154 (19.3 overs)	v	Adelaide Strikers (H); 9/137 (20 overs)
Marnus Labuschagne 46 (33); Harry Conway 3/36 (3.3 overs)		Matthew Short 39 (30); James Bazley 3/30 (4 overs)

Brisbane Heat won by 17 runs
Adelaide Oval, Adelaide
Attendance: 14,785
Umpires: Shawn Craig and Phillip Gillespie
Player of the match: Matthew Kuhnemann (Brisbane Heat)

- Adelaide Strikers won the toss and elected to field.

Match 41
14 January 2023
19:30 (N)
Scorecard

(H) Melbourne Renegades; 7/162 (20 overs)	v	Melbourne Stars; 7/156 (20 overs)
Sam Harper 51 (36); Liam Hatcher 2/34 (4 overs)		Joe Clarke 59 (37); Kane Richardson 2/17 (4 overs)

Melbourne Renegades won by 6 runs
Docklands Stadium, Melbourne
Attendance: 22,437
Umpires: Greg Davidson and Michael Graham-Smith
Player of the match: Kane Richardson (Melbourne Renegades)

- Melbourne Stars won the toss and elected to field.

Match 42
15 January 2023
13:40
Scorecard

Sydney Thunder; 135 (20 overs)	v	Hobart Hurricanes (H); 5/136 (16.1 overs)
Oliver Davies 45 (38); Nathan Ellis 4/27 (4 overs)		Tim David 76* (41); Daniel Sams 4/18 (4 overs)

Hobart Hurricanes won by 5 wickets
Bellerive Oval, Hobart
Attendance: 10,768
Umpires: Nathan Johnstone and Sam Nogajski
Player of the match: Nathan Ellis (Hobart Hurricanes)

- Sydney Thunder won the toss and elected to bat.

Match 43
15 January 2023
19:15 (N)
Scorecard

(H) Sydney Sixers; 5/151 (20 overs)	v	Perth Scorchers; 7/145 (20 overs)
Josh Philippe 54 (48); Peter Hatzoglou 2/27 (4 overs)		Stephen Eskinazi 66* (54); Sean Abbott 3/18 (4 overs)

Sydney Sixers won by 6 runs
Sydney Cricket Ground, Sydney
Attendance: 20,304
Umpires: Ben Treloar and Paul Wilson
Player of the match: Sean Abbott (Sydney Sixers)

- Perth Scorchers won the toss and elected to field.

Match 44
16 January 2023
19:15 (N)
Scorecard

(H) Melbourne Stars; 7/159 (20 overs)	v	Brisbane Heat; 7/160 (20 overs)
Nick Larkin 58 (36); Michael Neser 4/25 (4 overs)		Matt Renshaw 90* (56); Liam Hatcher 2/29 (4 overs)

Brisbane Heat won by 3 wickets
Melbourne Cricket Ground, Melbourne
Attendance: 12,991
Umpires: Gerard Abood and Donovan Koch
Player of the match: Matt Renshaw (Brisbane Heat)

- Brisbane Heat won the toss and elected to field.

=== Week 6 ===
Match 45
17 January 2023
19:15 (N)
Scorecard

(H) Sydney Sixers; 5/203 (20 overs)	v	Adelaide Strikers; 144 (19 overs)
Steve Smith 101 (56); Wes Agar 2/48 (4 overs)		Alex Carey 54 (35); Ben Dwarshuis 3/28 (4 overs)

Sydney Sixers won by 59 runs
Coffs Harbour International Stadium, Coffs Harbour
Attendance: 9,576
Umpires: Simon Lightbody and Bruce Oxenford
Player of the match: Steve Smith (Sydney Sixers)

- Adelaide Strikers won the toss and elected to field.

Match 46
18 January 2023
16:40 (D/N)
Scorecard

Hobart Hurricanes; 9/146 (20 overs)	v	Perth Scorchers (H); 3/147 (17.3 overs)
Tom Andrews 27 (21); Lance Morris 2/21 (4 overs)		Aaron Hardie 90* (62); Riley Meredith 2/35 (4 overs)

Perth Scorchers won by 7 wickets
Perth Stadium, Perth
Attendance: 25,956
Umpires: Greg Davidson and Phillip Gillespie
Player of the match: Aaron Hardie (Perth Scorchers)

- Hobart Hurricanes won the toss and elected to bat.

Match 47
19 January 2023
19:15 (N)
Scorecard

Melbourne Renegades; 9/142 (20 overs)	v	Sydney Thunder (H); 2/144 (18.3 overs)
Will Sutherland 42* (23); Usman Qadir 2/20 (4 overs)		Matthew Gilkes 74* (55); Corey Rocchiccioli 2/25 (4 overs)

Sydney Thunder won by 8 wickets
Manuka Oval, Canberra
Attendance: 10,862
Umpires: David Taylor and Paul Wilson
Player of the match: Matthew Gilkes (Sydney Thunder)

- Melbourne Renegades won the toss and elected to bat.

Match 48
20 January 2023
16:00 (D/N)
Scorecard

(H) Adelaide Strikers; 92 (17 overs)	v	Perth Scorchers; 3/94 (11.1 overs)
Adam Hose 30 (23); Peter Hatzoglou 3/14 (3 overs)		Aaron Hardie 43 (30); Cameron Boyce 2/12 (3 overs)

Perth Scorchers won by 7 wickets
Adelaide Oval, Adelaide
Attendance: 19,751
Umpires: Nathan Johnstone and Troy Penman
Player of the match: David Payne (Perth Scorchers)

- Adelaide Strikers won the toss and elected to bat.

Match 49
20 January 2023
19:00 (N)
Scorecard

(H) Brisbane Heat; 6/162 (20 overs)	v	Hobart Hurricanes; 6/150 (20 overs)
Matt Renshaw 41 (31); Joel Paris 2/15 (4 overs)		Matthew Wade 45 (37); Michael Neser 3/27 (4 overs)

Brisbane Heat won by 12 runs
The Gabba, Brisbane
Attendance: 19,636
Umpires: Bruce Oxenford and Stephen Dionysius
Player of the match: Michael Neser (Brisbane Heat)

- Hobart Hurricanes won the toss and elected to field.

Match 50
21 January 2023
19:05 (N)
Scorecard

(H) Sydney Sixers; 2/187 (19 overs)	v	Sydney Thunder; 62 (14.4 overs)
Steve Smith 125* (66); Gurinder Sandhu 2/42 (4 overs)		David Warner 16 (23); Steve O'Keefe 4/10 (3 overs)

Sydney Sixers won by 125 runs
Sydney Cricket Ground, Sydney
Attendance: 38,757
Umpires: Greg Davidson and Phillip Gillespie
Player of the match: Steve Smith (Sydney Sixers)

- Sydney Sixers won the toss and elected to bat.
- The match was reduced to 19 overs per side due to rain.

Match 51
22 January 2023
12:40
Scorecard

(H) Brisbane Heat; 4/188 (20 overs)	v	Melbourne Stars; 3/184 (20 overs)
Sam Hain 73* (41); Luke Wood 2/38 (4 overs)		Tom Rogers 41 (20); Mitchell Swepson 2/23 (4 overs)

Brisbane Heat won by 4 runs
The Gabba, Brisbane
Attendance: 18,184
Umpires: Gerard Abood and Ben Treloar
Player of the match: Sam Hain (Brisbane Heat)

- Brisbane Heat won the toss and elected to bat.

Match 52
22 January 2023
16:15 (D/N)
Scorecard

(H) Perth Scorchers; 5/212 (20 overs)	v	Melbourne Renegades; 5/202 (20 overs)
Cameron Bancroft 95* (50); Matt Critchley 2/34 (4 overs)		Aaron Finch 76* (35); Ashton Turner 2/25 (3 overs)

Perth Scorchers won by 10 runs
Perth Stadium, Perth
Attendance: 32,259
Umpires: Donovan Koch and Paul Wilson
Player of the match: Cameron Bancroft (Perth Scorchers)

- Melbourne Renegades won the toss and elected to field.

Match 53
23 January 2023
19:15 (N)
Scorecard

Sydney Sixers; 7/180 (20 overs)	v	Hobart Hurricanes (H); 8/156 (20 overs)
Steve Smith 66 (33); Patrick Dooley 3/42 (4 overs)		Zak Crawley 49 (45); Jackson Bird 2/26 (3 overs)

Sydney Sixers won by 24 runs
Bellerive Oval, Hobart
Attendance: 6,303
Umpires: Simon Lightbody and Sam Nogajski
Player of the match: Steve Smith (Sydney Sixers)

- Hobart Hurricanes won the toss and elected to field.

=== Week 7 ===
Match 54
24 January 2023
19:15 (N)
Scorecard

Adelaide Strikers; 7/142 (20 overs)	v	Melbourne Renegades (H); 4/143 (18.2 overs)
Alex Carey 65 (47); Fawad Ahmed 3/17 (4 overs)		Aaron Finch 63* (54); Peter Siddle 1/24 (3.2 overs)

Melbourne Renegades won by 6 wickets
Docklands Stadium, Melbourne
Attendance: 13,477
Umpires: Ben Treloar and Phillip Gillespie
Player of the match: Aaron Finch (Melbourne Renegades)

- Melbourne Renegades won the toss and elected to field.

Match 55
25 January 2023
13:40
Scorecard

(H) Hobart Hurricanes; 9/120 (20 overs)	v	Brisbane Heat; 8/118 (20 overs)
Macalister Wright 56 (56); Michael Neser 4/35 (4 overs)		Jimmy Peirson 39 (37); Faheem Ashraf 2/19 (4 overs)

Hobart Hurricanes won by 2 runs
York Park, Launceston
Attendance: 4,822
Umpires: Donovan Koch and Sam Nogajski
Player of the match: Nathan Ellis (Hobart Hurricanes)

- Brisbane Heat won the toss and elected to field.

Match 56
25 January 2023
19:15 (N)
Scorecard

(H) Melbourne Stars; 7/119 (20 overs)	v	Sydney Thunder; 7/120 (18.5 overs)
Hilton Cartwright 36 (36); Usman Qadir 3/24 (4 overs)		Daniel Sams 28 (18); Adam Zampa 3/25 (4 overs)

Sydney Thunder won by 3 wickets
Melbourne Cricket Ground, Melbourne
Attendance: 16,482
Umpires: Bruce Oxenford and Nathan Johnstone
Player of the match: Chris Green (Sydney Thunder)

- Sydney Thunder won the toss and elected to field.

== Play-offs ==
Eliminator
4	Sydney Thunder	1/52 (6.5 overs)
5	Brisbane Heat	5/203 (20 overs)

Qualifier
1	Perth Scorchers	3/154 (18.3 overs)
2	Sydney Sixers	8/151 (20 overs)
Knockout
3	Melbourne Renegades	5/162 (20 overs)
5	Brisbane Heat	3/164 (18.5 overs)

Challenger
2	Sydney Sixers	9/116 (20 overs)
5	Brisbane Heat	6/117 (18.2 overs)

Final
1	Perth Scorchers	5/178 (19.2 overs)
5	Brisbane Heat	7/175 (20 overs)

=== Eliminator ===
27 January 2023
19:15 (N)
Scorecard

Brisbane Heat; 5/203 (20 overs)	v	Sydney Thunder; 1/52 (6.5 overs)
Usman Khawaja 94 (55); Chris Green 2/29 (4 overs)		David Warner 36* (20); James Bazley 1/3 (1 over)

Brisbane Heat won by 8 runs (DLS method)
Sydney Showground Stadium, Sydney
Attendance: 7,067
Umpires: Gerard Abood and Phillip Gillespie
Player of the match: Usman Khawaja (Brisbane Heat)

- Sydney Thunder won the toss and elected to field.
- Sydney Thunder innings curtailed at 6.5 overs due to rain; DLS par score was 60.
- Ross Pawson (Sydney Thunder) made his T20 debut.

=== Qualifier ===
28 January 2023
16:15 (D/N)
Scorecard

Sydney Sixers; 8/151 (20 overs)	v	Perth Scorchers; 3/154 (18.3 overs)
Moises Henriques 58 (43); David Payne 3/33 (4 overs)		Ashton Turner 84* (47); Sean Abbott 3/25 (4 overs)

Perth Scorchers won by 7 wickets
Perth Stadium, Perth
Attendance: 41,126
Umpires: Donovan Koch and Paul Wilson
Player of the match: Ashton Turner (Perth Scorchers)

- Sydney Sixers won the toss and elected to bat.

=== Knockout ===
29 January 2023
19:15 (N)
Scorecard

Melbourne Renegades; 5/162 (20 overs)	v	Brisbane Heat; 3/164 (18.5 overs)
Shaun Marsh 82* (53); Xavier Bartlett 3/18 (4 overs)		Usman Khawaja 59 (47); Tom Rogers 2/33 (3.5 overs)

Brisbane Heat won by 7 wickets
Docklands Stadium, Melbourne
Attendance: 10,699
Umpires: Bruce Oxenford and Phillip Gillespie
Player of the match: Xavier Bartlett (Brisbane Heat)

- Brisbane Heat won the toss and elected to field.

=== Challenger ===
2 February 2023
19:15 (N)
Scorecard

Sydney Sixers; 9/116 (20 overs)	v	Brisbane Heat; 6/117 (18.2 overs)
Daniel Hughes 23 (24); Matthew Kuhnemann 3/17 (4 overs)		Michael Neser 48* (32); Izharulhaq Naveed 2/28 (4 overs)

Brisbane Heat won by 4 wickets
Sydney Cricket Ground, Sydney
Attendance: 15,852
Umpires: Donovan Koch and Sam Nogajski
Player of the match: Michael Neser (Brisbane Heat)

- Sydney Sixers won the toss and elected to bat.

=== Final ===
4 February 2023
16:30 (D/N)
Scorecard

Brisbane Heat; 7/175 (20 overs)	v	Perth Scorchers; 5/178 (19.2 overs)
Nathan McSweeney 41 (37); Jason Behrendorff 2/26 (4 overs)		Ashton Turner 53 (32); Matthew Kuhnemann 1/28 (4 overs)

Perth Scorchers won by 5 wickets
Perth Stadium, Perth
Attendance: 53,886
Umpires: Sam Nogajski and Paul Wilson
Player of the match: Ashton Turner (Perth Scorchers)

- Brisbane Heat won the toss and elected to bat.

== Season statistics ==
=== Team records ===
Highest totals
Score (Overs)	Team	Opponent	Result
3/230 (19.3)	Adelaide Strikers	Hobart Hurricanes	Won
4/229 (20.0)	Hobart Hurricanes	Adelaide Strikers	Lost
7/229 (20.0)	Perth Scorchers	Melbourne Stars	Won
6/228 (20.0)	Sydney Thunder	Hobart Hurricanes	Won
5/224 (20.0)	Brisbane Heat	Sydney Sixers	Won

=== Batting records ===
Most runs
Batsmen	Team	Runs
Aaron Hardie	Perth Scorchers	460
Matt Short	Adelaide Strikers	458
Josh Inglis	Perth Scorchers	431
Aaron Finch	Melbourne Renegades	428
Chris Lynn	Adelaide Strikers	416

Highest individual score
Batsmen	Runs	Opposition
Steven Smith	125 not out	Sydney Thunder
Joe Clarke	101 not out	Hobart Hurricanes
Steven Smith	101	Adelaide Strikers
Matt Short	100 not out	Hobart Hurricanes
Colin Munro	98	Sydney Thunder

=== Bowling records ===
Most wickets
Bowler	Team	Wickets
Sean Abbott	Sydney Sixers	29
Andrew Tye	Perth Scorchers	26
Michaeel Neser	Brisbane Heat	26
Tom Rogers	Melbourne Renegades	23
Jason Behrendorff	Perth Scorchers	21

Best bowling figures in an innings
Bowler	Team	Opposition	Figures
Henry Thornton	Adelaide Strikers	Sydney Thunder	5/3
Tom Rogers	Melbourne Renegades	Melbourne Stars	5/16
Luke Wood	Melbourne Stars	Perth Scorchers	5/50
Wes Agar	Adelaide Strikers	Sydney Thunder	4/6
Jhye Richardson	Perth Scorchers	Sydney Sixers	4/9

== Attendances ==
Match attendances in chronological order
Match	Teams	Date	Venue	Location	Attendance	Capacity % (Note: Based on general venue capacity, which will vary depending on cricket capacity.)
1	Sydney Thunder vs Melbourne Stars	13 December 2022	Manuka Oval	Canberra	6,211	46%
2	Adelaide Strikers vs Sydney Sixers	14 December 2022	Adelaide Oval	Adelaide	12,621	24%
3	Brisbane Heat vs Melbourne Renegades	15 December 2022	Cazalys Stadium	Cairns	6,708	50%
4	Melbourne Stars vs Hobart Hurricanes	16 December 2022	Melbourne Cricket Ground	Melbourne	9,142	9%
5	Sydney Thunder vs Adelaide Strikers	16 December 2022	Sydney Showground Stadium	Sydney	6,103	25%
6	Perth Scorchers vs Sydney Sixers	17 December 2022	Perth Stadium	Perth	21,042	35%
7	Melbourne Renegades vs Sydney Thunder	18 December 2022	Docklands Stadium	Melbourne	7,087	13%
8	Hobart Hurricanes vs Perth Scorchers	19 December 2022	York Park	Launceston	5,342	28%
9	Adelaide Strikers vs Sydney Thunder	20 December 2022	Adelaide Oval	Adelaide	17,134	32%
10	Melbourne Renegades vs Brisbane Heat	21 December 2022	Kardinia Park	Geelong	6,892	19%
11	Sydney Sixers vs Hobart Hurricanes	22 December 2022	Sydney Cricket Ground	Sydney	13,432	30%
12	Melbourne Stars vs Perth Scorchers	23 December 2022	Junction Oval	Melbourne	3,697	74%
13	Brisbane Heat vs Adelaide Strikers	23 December 2022	The Gabba	Brisbane	17,283	48%
14	Hobart Hurricanes vs Melbourne Renegades	24 December 2022	Bellerive Oval	Hobart	9,128	46%
15	Sydney Sixers vs Melbourne Stars	26 December 2022	Sydney Cricket Ground	Sydney	13,235	28%
16	Perth Scorchers vs Adelaide Strikers	26 December 2022	Perth Stadium	Perth	26,211	43%
17	Sydney Thunder vs Brisbane Heat	27 December 2022	Sydney Showground Stadium	Sydney	8,534	36%
18	Sydney Sixers vs Melbourne Renegades	28 December 2022	Sydney Cricket Ground	Sydney	16,208	34%
19	Brisbane Heat vs Sydney Thunder	29 December 2022	Carrara Stadium	Gold Coast	14,575	65%
20	Perth Scorchers vs Melbourne Stars	29 December 2022	Perth Stadium	Perth	27,752	45%
21	Melbourne Renegades vs Sydney Sixers	30 December 2022	Kardinia Park	Geelong	12,336	34%
22	Sydney Thunder vs Hobart Hurricanes	31 December 2022	Lavington Sports Ground	Albury	10,171	85%
23	Adelaide Strikers vs Melbourne Stars	31 December 2022	Adelaide Oval	Adelaide	40,373	75%
24	Melbourne Renegades vs Perth Scorchers	1 January 2023	Docklands Stadium	Melbourne	9,027	16%
25	Brisbane Heat vs Sydney Sixers	1 January 2023	The Gabba	Brisbane	23,689	66%
26	Hobart Hurricanes vs Adelaide Strikers	2 January 2023	Bellerive Oval	Hobart	6,113	31%
27	Melbourne Stars vs Melbourne Renegades	3 January 2023	Melbourne Cricket Ground	Melbourne	38,564	39%
28	Sydney Sixers vs Brisbane Heat	4 January 2023	North Sydney Oval	Sydney	8,384	84%
29	Perth Scorchers vs Sydney Thunder	4 January 2023	Perth Stadium	Perth	24,182	39%
30	Adelaide Strikers vs Hobart Hurricanes	5 January 2023	Adelaide Oval	Adelaide	21,727	41%
31	Melbourne Stars vs Sydney Sixers	6 January 2023	Melbourne Cricket Ground	Melbourne	17,137	17%
32	Melbourne Renegades vs Hobart Hurricanes	7 January 2023	Docklands Stadium	Melbourne	12,514	23%
33	Perth Scorchers vs Brisbane Heat	7 January 2023	Perth Stadium	Perth	28,029	47%
34	Sydney Thunder vs Sydney Sixers	8 January 2023	Sydney Showground Stadium	Sydney	20,864	87%
35	Hobart Hurricanes vs Melbourne Stars	9 January 2023	Bellerive Oval	Hobart	7,003	36%
36	Adelaide Strikers vs Melbourne Renegades	10 January 2023	Adelaide Oval	Adelaide	21,345	40%
37	Brisbane Heat vs Perth Scorchers	11 January 2023	The Gabba	Brisbane	16,816	47%
38	Melbourne Stars vs Adelaide Strikers	12 January 2023	Melbourne Cricket Ground	Melbourne	16,224	16%
39	Sydney Thunder vs Perth Scorchers	13 January 2023	Sydney Showground Stadium	Sydney	11,076	46%
40	Adelaide Strikers vs Brisbane Heat	14 January 2023	Adelaide Oval	Adelaide	14,785	28%
41	Melbourne Renegades vs Melbourne Stars	14 January 2023	Docklands Stadium	Melbourne	22,437	40%
42	Hobart Hurricanes vs Sydney Thunder	15 January 2023	Bellerive Oval	Hobart	10,768	55%
43	Sydney Sixers vs Perth Scorchers	15 January 2023	Sydney Cricket Ground	Sydney	20,304	42%
44	Melbourne Stars vs Brisbane Heat	16 January 2023	Melbourne Cricket Ground	Melbourne	12,991	13%
45	Sydney Sixers vs Adelaide Strikers	17 January 2023	Coffs Harbour International Stadium	Coffs Harbour	9,576	96%
46	Perth Scorchers vs Hobart Hurricanes	18 January 2023	Perth Stadium	Perth	25,956	42%
47	Sydney Thunder vs Melbourne Renegades	19 January 2023	Manuka Oval	Canberra	10,862	68%
48	Adelaide Strikers vs Perth Scorchers	20 January 2023	Adelaide Oval	Adelaide	19,751	37%
49	Brisbane Heat vs Hobart Hurricanes	20 January 2023	The Gabba	Brisbane	19,636	55%
50	Sydney Sixers vs Sydney Thunder	21 January 2023	Sydney Cricket Ground	Sydney	38,757	81%
51	Brisbane Heat vs Melbourne Stars	22 January 2023	The Gabba	Brisbane	18,184	51%
52	Perth Scorchers vs Melbourne Renegades	22 January 2023	Perth Stadium	Perth	32,259	53%
53	Hobart Hurricanes vs Sydney Sixers	23 January 2023	Bellerive Oval	Hobart	6,303	32%
54	Melbourne Renegades vs Adelaide Strikers	24 January 2023	Docklands Stadium	Melbourne	13,477	24%
55	Hobart Hurricanes vs Brisbane Heat	25 January 2023	York Park	Launceston	4,822	25%
56	Melbourne Stars vs Sydney Thunder	25 January 2023	Melbourne Cricket Ground	Melbourne	16,482	16%
Eliminator	Sydney Thunder vs Brisbane Heat	27 January 2023	Sydney Showground Stadium	Sydney	7,067	29%
Qualifier	Perth Scorchers vs Sydney Sixers	28 January 2023	Perth Stadium	Perth	41,126	67%
Knockout	Melbourne Renegades vs Brisbane Heat	29 January 2023	Docklands Stadium	Melbourne	10,699	19%
Challenger	Sydney Sixers vs Brisbane Heat	2 February 2023	Sydney Cricket Ground	Sydney	15,852	33%
Final	Perth Scorchers vs Brisbane Heat	4 February 2023	Perth Stadium	Perth	53,886	88%
Total					1,019,891	—
Average					16,720	43%

Team	Venue/s	Match 1	Match 2	Match 3	Match 4	Match 5	Match 6	Match 7	Final 1	Final 2	Average
Perth Scorchers	Perth Stadium	21,042	26,211	27,752	24,182	28,029	25,956	32,259	41,126	53,886	31,160
Adelaide Strikers	Adelaide Oval	12,621	17,134	40,373	21,727	21,345	14,785	19,751	—N/a	—N/a	21,105
Sydney Sixers	Sydney Cricket Ground, C.ex Coffs International, North Sydney Oval	13,432	13,235	16,208	8,384	20,304	9,576	38,757	15,852	—N/a	16,969
Brisbane Heat	The Gabba, Carrara Stadium, Cazalys Stadium	6,708	17,283	14,575	23,689	16,816	19,636	18,184	—N/a	—N/a	16,699
Melbourne Stars	Melbourne Cricket Ground, Lavington Sports Ground, Junction Oval	9,142	3,697	38,564	17,137	16,224	12,991	16,482	—N/a	—N/a	16,320
Melbourne Renegades	Docklands Stadium, Kardinia Park	7,087	6,892	12,336	9,097	12,514	22,437	13,477	10,699	—N/a	11,817
Sydney Thunder	Sydney Showground Stadium, Manuka Oval	6,211	6,103	8,534	10,171	20,864	11,076	10,862	7,067	—N/a	10,111
Hobart Hurricanes	Bellerive Oval, UTAS Stadium	5,342	9,128	6,113	7,003	10,768	6,303	4,822	—N/a	—N/a	7,068
Average	All	10,198	12,460	20,557	15,174	18,358	15,345	19,324	25,726		16,721
