= Arch of Constantine =

4th-century triumphal arch in Rome, Italy

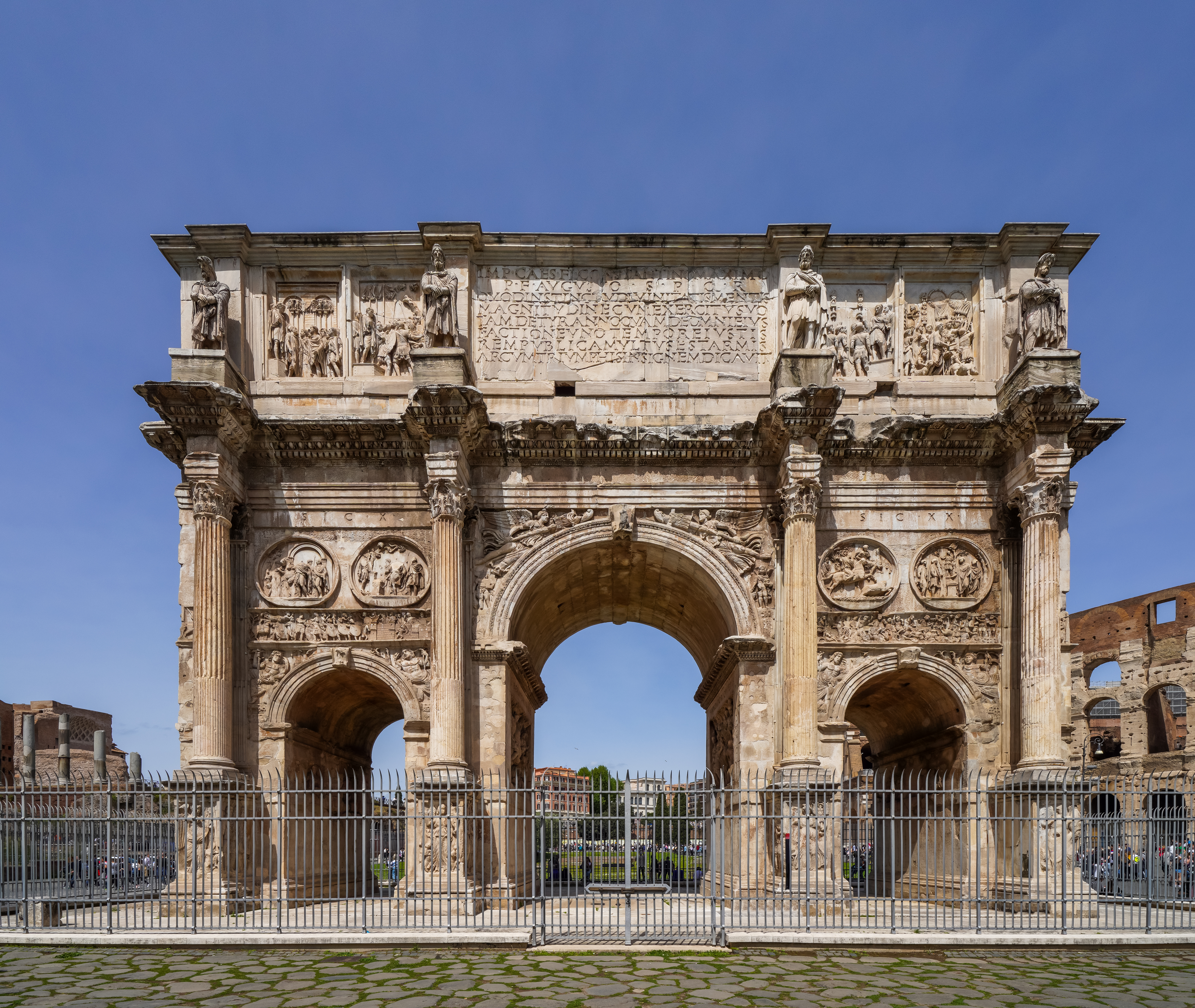
- Arch of Constantine

- Shown within Augustan Rome
- Click on the map for a fullscreen view
- 41°53′23″N 12°29′27″E
- Type: Triumphal arch
- Location: Regio X Palatium

History
- Built: AD 315
- Built by: Constantine I

The Arch of Constantine (Italian: Arco di Costantino) is a triumphal arch in Rome dedicated to the emperor Constantine the Great. The arch was commissioned by the Roman Senate to commemorate Constantine's victory over Maxentius at the Battle of the Milvian Bridge in AD 312. Situated between the Colosseum and the Palatine Hill, the arch spans the Via Triumphalis, the route taken by victorious military leaders when they entered the city in a triumphal procession. (Note: By the "Senate and people" (S.P.Q.R.) according to the inscription, though the Emperor may have "suggested". See also: A. L. Frothingham. "Who Built the Arch of Constantine? III." The Attic, American Journal of Archaeology, Vol. 19, No. 1. (Jan.–Mar., 1915), pp. 1–12) Dedicated in 315, it is the largest Roman triumphal arch, with overall dimensions of 21 m (69 ft) high, 25.9 m (85 ft) wide and 7.4 m (24 ft) deep. It has three bays, the central one being 11.5 m (38 ft) high and 6.5 m (21 ft) wide and the laterals 7.4 m (24 ft) by 3.4 m (11 ft) each. The arch is constructed of brick-faced concrete covered in marble.

The three-bay design with detached columns was first used for the Arch of Septimius Severus in the Roman Forum (which stands at the end of the triumph route) and repeated in several other arches now lost.

Though dedicated to Constantine, much of the sculptural decoration consists of reliefs and statues removed from earlier triumphal monuments dedicated to Trajan (98–117), Hadrian (117–138) and Marcus Aurelius (161–180), with the portrait heads replaced with his own. The resulting mixture of sculptural styles has given rise to much discussion among art historians.

== History ==
The arch, which was constructed between 312 and 315, was dedicated by the Senate to commemorate ten years (a decennia (Note: Constantine chose to date his accession to power from the time of his acclamation by the troops at York in England on 25 July 306. Thus he chose to celebrate his decennalia in the year July 315 to July 316)) of Constantine's reign (306–337) and his victory over the then reigning emperor Maxentius (306–312) at the Battle of the Milvian Bridge on 28 October 312, as described on its attic inscription, and officially opened on 25 July 315. Not only did the Roman senate give the arch for Constantine's victory, they also were celebrating decennalia: a series of games that happened every decade during the Roman Empire. On these occasions they also said many prayers and renewed both spiritual and mundane vows. However, Constantine had actually entered Rome on 29 October 312, amidst great rejoicing, and the Senate then commissioned the monument. Constantine then left Rome within two months and did not return until 326.

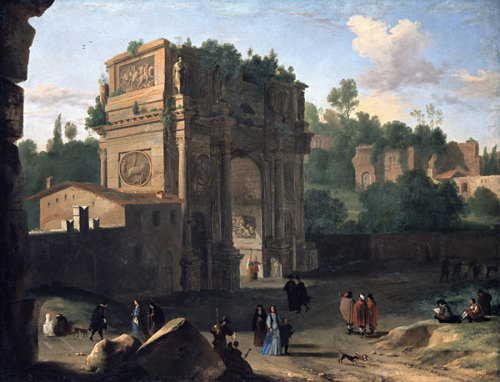
The Arch of Constantine, Rome - painted by Herman van Swanevelt, 17th century

The location, between the Palatine Hill and the Caelian Hill, spanned the ancient route of Roman triumphs (Via triumphalis) at its origin, where it diverged from the Via sacra. This was the route taken by the emperors entering the city in triumph: it started at the Campus Martius, led through the Circus Maximus, and around the Palatine Hill; immediately after the Arch of Constantine, the procession would turn left at the Meta Sudans and march along the Via sacra to the Forum Romanum and on to the Capitoline Hill, passing through both the Arches of Titus and Septimius Severus. Jones argues that its placement in relation to the Circus Maximus, the Temple of Venus and Rome, and the base of the Colossus indicates a deliberate Constantinian urban design concept, rather than reuse of an earlier arch on that spot.

During the Middle Ages, the Arch of Constantine was incorporated into one of the family strongholds of ancient Rome, as shown in the painting by Herman van Swanevelt, here. In 1534 Lorenzino de' Medici mutilated the heads of some of the statues. Works of restoration were first carried out in the 18th century, (Note: Deane comments that Gradara published an excerpt from the diary of Pietro Bracci in 1732, in which Bracci states that he carved new heads for seven of the Dacian slaves surmounting the columns and a completely new statue for the eighth (right of centre, south side). He also made new heads for the emperors and other figures on the reliefs between the slaves) with the latest excavations in the late 1990s, just before the Great Jubilee of 2000. The arch served as the finish line for the marathon athletic event for the 1960 Summer Olympics.

The arch was damaged after a direct lightning strike on 3 September 2024.

Dates of incorporated decorative material

=== Controversy ===
There has been much controversy over the origins of the arch, with some scholars claiming that it should no longer be referred to as Constantine's arch, but is in fact an earlier work from the time of Hadrian, reworked during Constantine's reign, or at least the lower part. (Note: For which, see Conforto, however, for the contrary view that the whole arch was constructed in the 4th century, see Pensabene & Panella) Recent scholarship considers the monument primarily a senatorial commission, with the Senate responsible for initiating the project while remaining compatible with Constantine’s own political image. Another theory holds that it was erected, or at least started, by Maxentius, (Note: The controversy extends to a number of other public buildings attributed to Constantine, as hinted at by Aurelius Victor in De Caesaribus) and one scholar believed it was as early as the time of Domitian (81–96). Some recent historiography also argues that the influential model proposed by L’Orange and von Gerkan in 1939 may itself have been shaped by the Fascist political climate in Rome during the 1930s, when Mussolini promoted visual links between ancient and modern Rome.

=== Symbolism ===
Maxentius's reputation in Rome was influenced by his contributions to public building. By the time of his accession in 306 Rome was becoming increasingly irrelevant to the governance of the empire, most emperors choosing to live elsewhere and focusing on defending the fragile boundaries, where they frequently founded new cities.

These factors contributed to Maxentius' ability to seize power. In contrast to his predecessors, Maxentius concentrated on restoring the capital; his epithet was conservator urbis suae (preserver of his city). Thus, Constantine was perceived as the deposer of one of the city's greatest benefactors, and needed to acquire legitimacy. Much controversy has surrounded the patronage of the public works of this period. Issuing a damnatio memoriae, Constantine set out to systematically erase the memory of Maxentius. Consequently, there remains considerable uncertainty regarding the patronage of early fourth century public buildings, including the Arch of Constantine, which may originally have been an Arch of Maxentius.

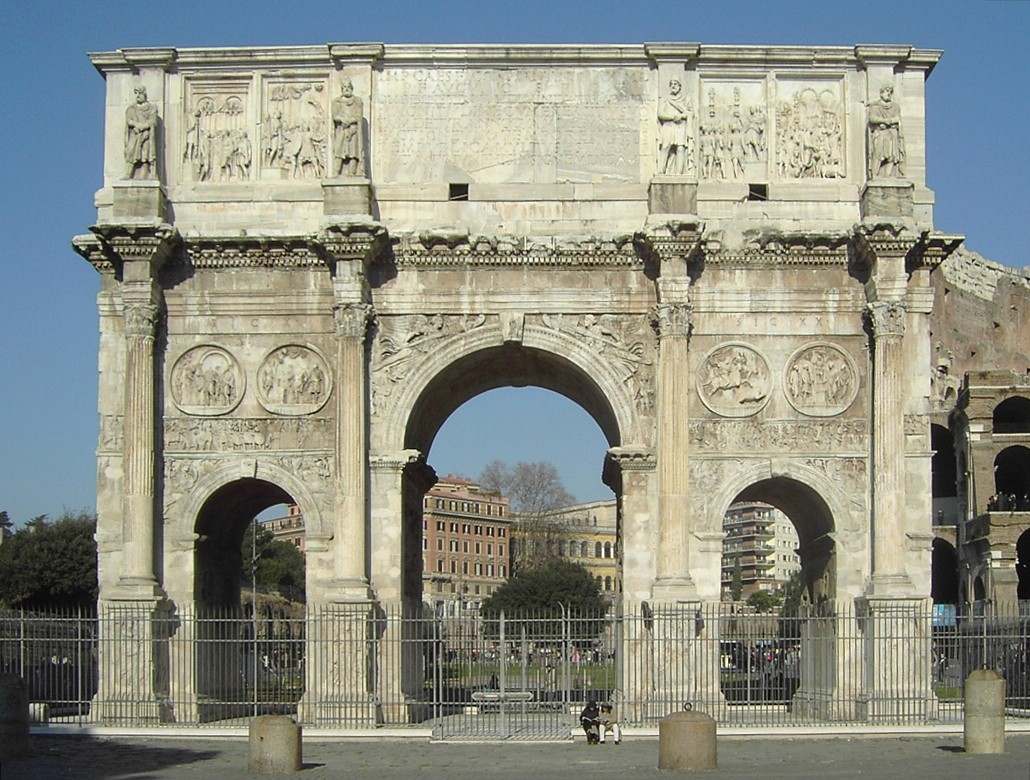
South side, from Via triumphalis. Colosseum to right

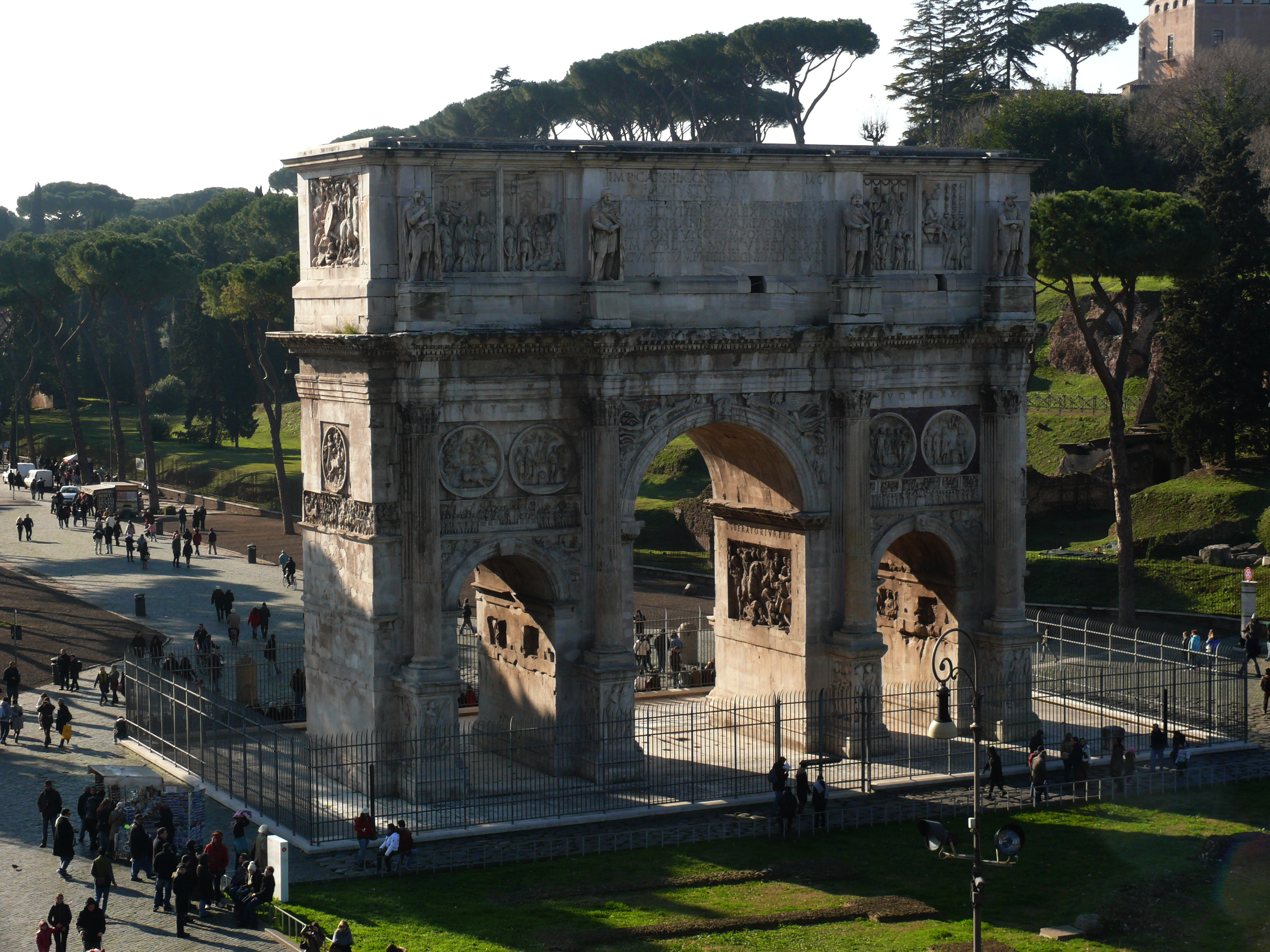
North side, from the Colosseum

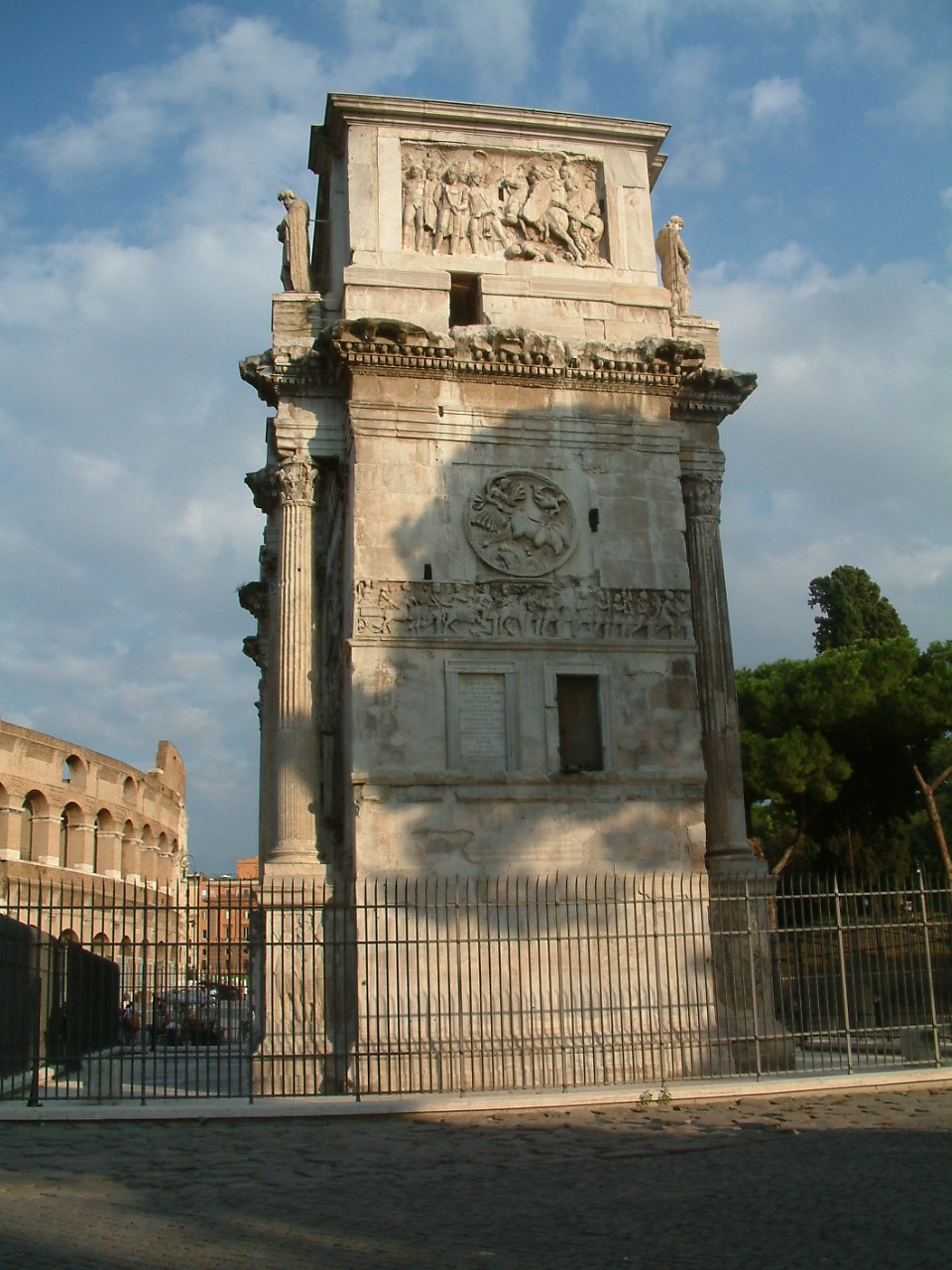
West side

=== Location and sightlines ===
Modern scholarship has also examined how the arch functioned visually within the surrounding topography of the Colosseum Valley. Marlowe argues that the designers adjusted the building’s position relative to the ancient triumphal road and to nearby monuments such as the Meta Sudans fountain and the Colossus of Sol. She notes that the arch was set “not over the road but rather a bit further north,” and that it was shifted “about 6½ feet (2 meters)” to the east. According to Marlowe, this meant that “the tall cone of the fountain was almost completely hidden behind the arch’s second pier,” and that this small displacement “framed a different ancient monument in the Colosseum Valley: the (now-lost) colossal bronze statue of the Sun god Sol.”

== Sculptural style ==
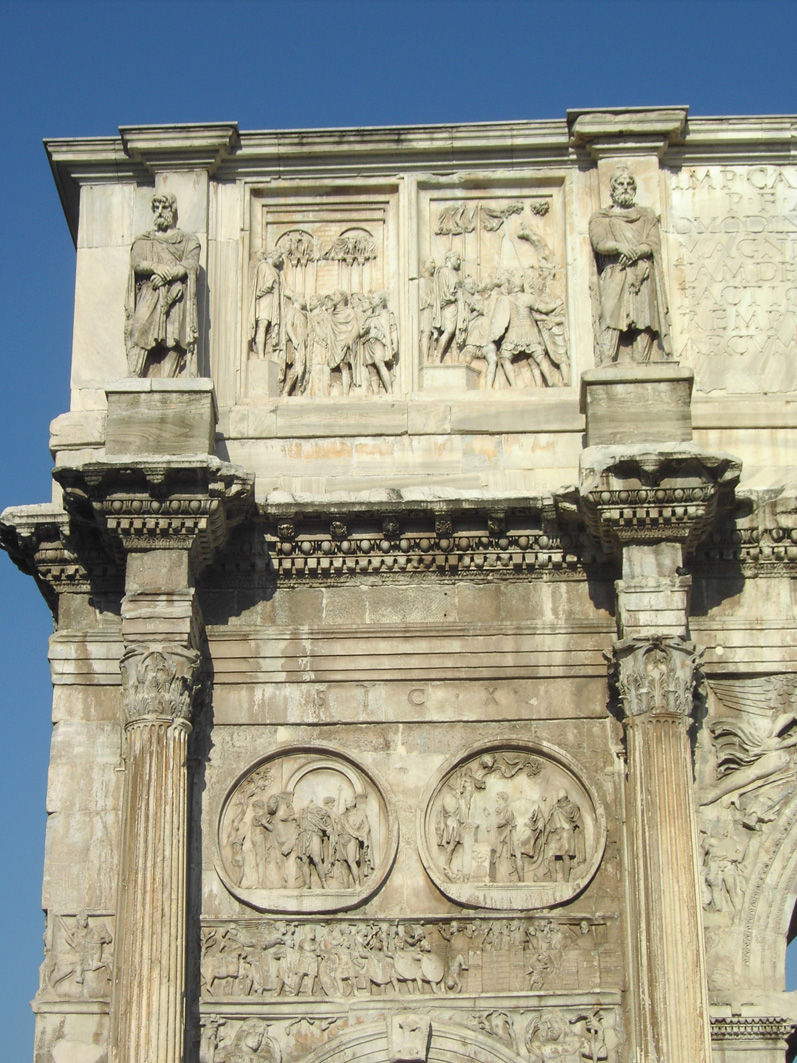
Relief panels, round reliefs and frieze over left (west) arch, from south

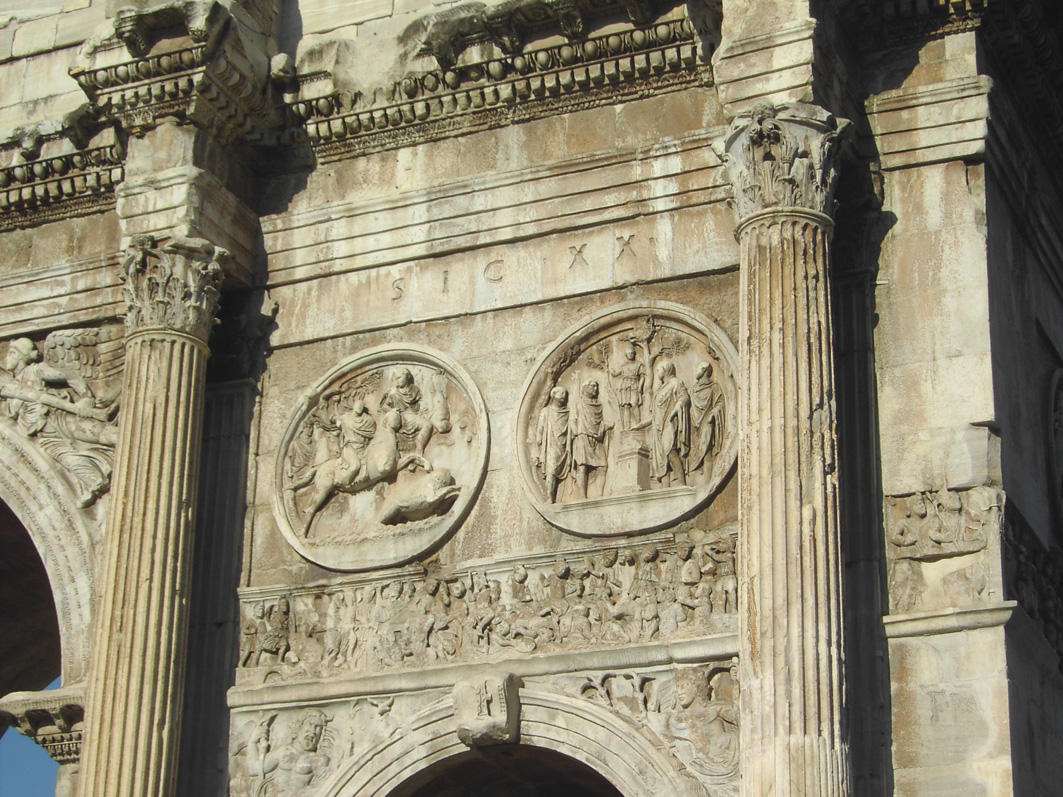
Round reliefs and frieze over right (east) arch, from south

Constantine's Arch is an important example, frequently cited in surveys of art history, of the stylistic changes of the 4th century, and the "collapse of the classical Greek canon of forms during the late Roman period", a sign the city was in decline, and would soon be eclipsed by Constantine's founding of a new capital at Constantinople in 324.

The supposed aesthetic deficiencies of the work were lamented by Edward Gibbon in his seminal Decline and Fall of the Roman Empire: “The triumphal arch of Constantine still remains a melancholy proof of the decline of the arts, and a singular testimony of the meanest vanity.” Gibbon describes how elements from earlier constructions were stripped and repurposed without regard to artistic coherence, and criticises the freshly sculpted pieces as being “executed in the rudest and most unskilful manner.”

Later art historians have echoed Gibbon’s dim assessment. The contrast between the styles of the re-used Imperial reliefs of Trajan, Hadrian and Marcus Aurelius and those newly made for the arch is dramatic and, according to Ernst Kitzinger, "violent", that where the head of an earlier emperor was replaced by that of Constantine the artist was still able to achieve a "soft, delicate rendering of the face of Constantine" that was "a far cry from the dominant style of the workshop". It remains the most impressive surviving civic monument from Rome in Late Antiquity, but is also one of the most controversial with regards to its origins and meanings.

Kitzinger compares a roundel of Hadrian lion-hunting, which is "still rooted firmly in the tradition of late Hellenistic art", and there is "an illusion of open, airy space in which figures move freely and with relaxed self-assurance" with the later frieze where the figures are "pressed, trapped, as it were, between two imaginary planes and so tightly packed within the frame as to lack all freedom of movement in any direction", with "gestures that are "jerky, overemphatic and uncoordinated with the rest of the body". In the 4th century reliefs, the figures are disposed geometrically in a pattern that "makes sense only in relation to the spectator", in the largesse scene (below) centred on the emperor who looks directly out to the viewer. Kitzinger continues:

Gone too is the classical canon of proportions. Heads are disproportionately large, trunks square, legs stubby ... Differences in the physical size of figures drastically underline differences of rank and importance which the second-century artist had indicated by subtle compositional means within a seemingly casual grouping. Gone, finally are elaboration of detail and differentiation of surface texture. Faces are cut rather than modeled, hair takes the form of a cap with some superficial stippling, drapery folds are summarily indicated by deeply drilled lines.

The commission was clearly highly important, if hurried, and the work must be considered as reflecting the best available craftsmanship in Rome at the time; the same workshop was probably responsible for a number of surviving sarcophagi. Rose argues that the same sculptural workshops responsible for Diocletian’s new monuments in Rome were likely also responsible for reworking those reliefs for the Arch of Constantine. The question of how to account for what may seem a decline in both style and execution has generated a vast amount of discussion. Some art historians have argued that the stylistic contrasts visible on the arch should not be understood only as technical decline or loss of skill. In this interpretation, the reuse of earlier reliefs and the new Constantinian panels together form a deliberate visual strategy that reshapes imperial imagery while still employing traditional architectural language. Instead of being merely derivative, the arch can be read as part of an intentional reframing of Roman art in the early fourth century, in which older visual material was selectively redeployed to signal new ideological priorities under Constantine.

Factors introduced into the discussion include: a breakdown of the transmission in artistic skills due to the political and economic disruption of the Crisis of the Third Century,influence from Eastern and other pre-classical regional styles from around the Empire (a view promoted by Josef Strzygowski (1862–1941), and now mostly discounted), the emergence into high-status public art of a simpler "popular" or "Italic" style that had been used by the less wealthy throughout the reign of Greek models, an active ideological turning against what classical styles had come to represent, and a deliberate preference for seeing the world simply and exploiting the expressive possibilities of a simpler style. The sculptors of Constantine's time were more interested in symbolism: both symbolism for religion as well as symbolism for history. One factor that cannot be responsible, as the date and origin of the Venice Portrait of the Four Tetrarchs show, is the rise of Christianity to official support, as the changes predated that.

The stylistic references to the earlier arches of Titus and Septimius Severus, together with the incorporation of spolia from the times of other earlier emperors may be considered a deliberate tribute to Roman history.

== Iconography ==
The arch is heavily decorated with parts of older monuments, which assume a new meaning in the context of the Constantinian building. As it celebrates the victory of Constantine, the new "historic" friezes illustrating his campaign in Italy convey the central meaning: the praise of the emperor, both in battle and in his civilian duties. The other imagery supports this purpose: decoration taken from the "golden times" of the Empire under the 2nd century emperors whose reliefs were re-used places Constantine next to these "good emperors", and the content of the pieces evokes images of the victorious and pious ruler. Jones has argued that the overall design concept of the arch was conceived as a deliberate synthesis of earlier imperial monuments, presenting past architectural models within a single unified composition as part of its original conception.

Another explanation given for the re-use is the short time between the start of construction (late 312 at the earliest) and the dedication (summer 315), so the architects used existing artwork to make up for the lack of time to create new art. It could be that so many old parts were used because the builders themselves did not feel the artists of their time could do better than what had already been done by different people. As yet another possible reason, it has often been suggested that the Romans of the 4th century truly did lack the artistic skill to produce acceptable artwork, and were aware of it, and therefore plundered the ancient buildings to adorn their contemporary monuments. This interpretation has become less prominent in more recent times, as the art of Late Antiquity has been appreciated in its own right. It is possible that a combination of those explanations is correct.

=== Attic ===
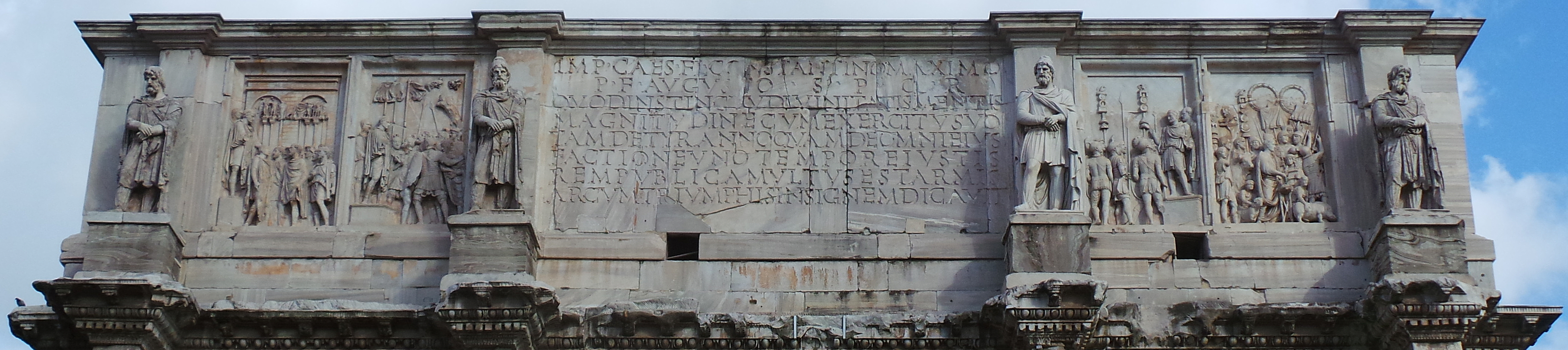
South attic

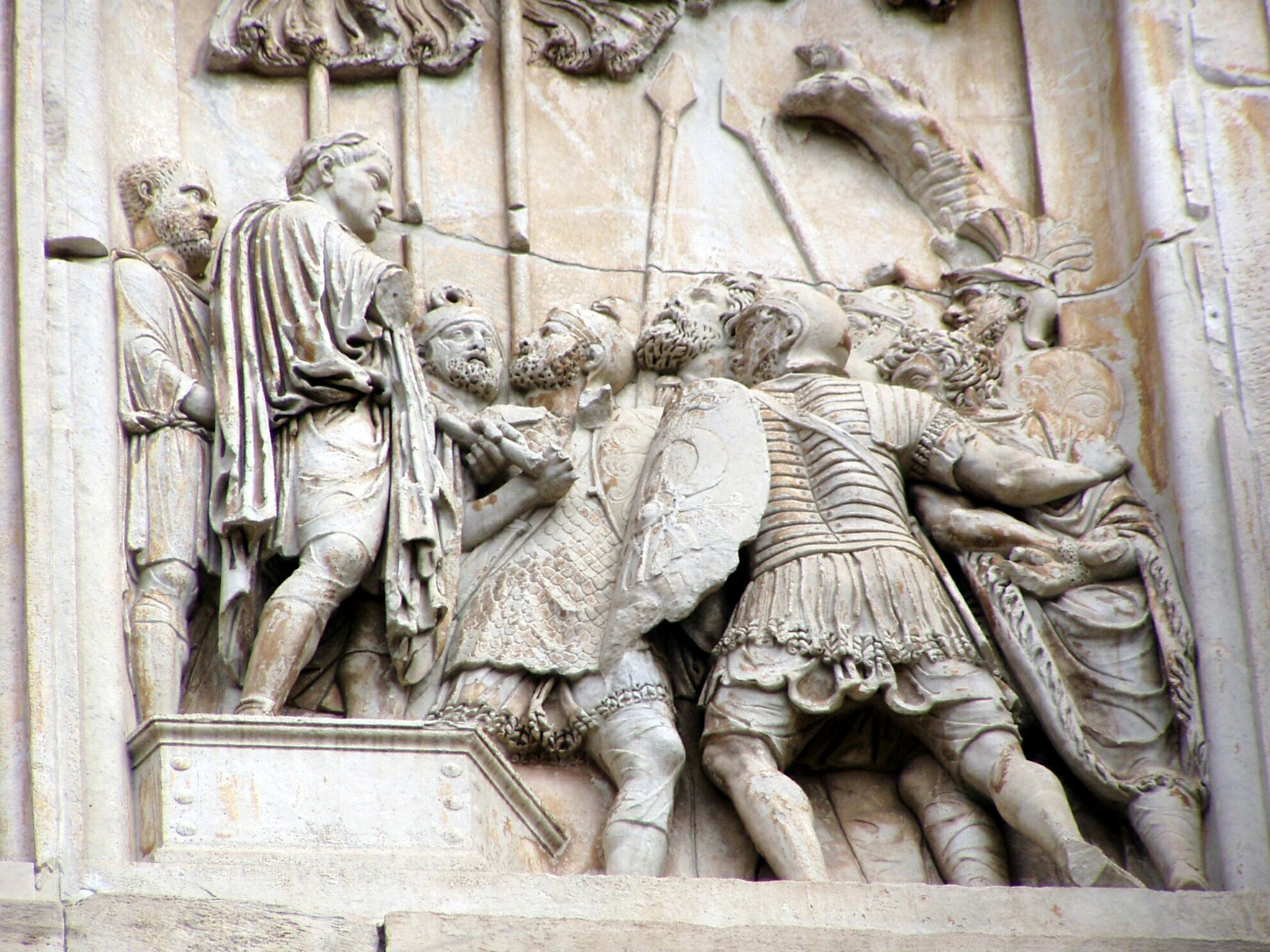
Detail of relief panel, south side, right panel of left arch

On the top of each column, large sculptures representing Dacians can be seen, which date from Trajan. Above the central archway is the inscription, forming the most prominent portion of the attic and is identical on both sides of the arch. Flanking the inscription on both sides are four pairs of relief panels above the minor archways, eight in total. These were taken from an unknown monument erected in honour of Marcus Aurelius. On the north side, from left to right, the panels depict the emperor's return to Rome after the campaign (adventus), the emperor leaving the city and saluted by a personification of the Via Flaminia, the emperor distributing money among the people (largitio), and the emperor interrogating a German prisoner. On the south side, from left to right, are depicted a captured enemy chieftain led before the emperor, a similar scene with other prisoners (illustrated below), the emperor speaking to the troops (adlocutio), and the emperor sacrificing a pig, sheep and bull (suovetaurilia). Together with three panels now in the Capitoline Museum, the reliefs were probably taken from a triumphal monument commemorating Marcus Aurelius' war against the Marcomanni and the Sarmatians from 169–175, which ended with Marcus Aurelius' triumphant return in 176. On the largitio panel, the figure of Marcus Aurelius' son Commodus has been eradicated following the latter's damnatio memoriae.

From the same time period the two large (3 m high) panels decorating the attic on the east and west sides of the arch show scenes from Trajan's Dacian Wars. Together with the two reliefs on the inside of the central archway, these came from a large frieze celebrating the Dacian victory. The original place of this frieze was either the Forum of Trajan, or the barracks of the emperor's horse guard on the Caelius.

=== Main section ===
The general layout of the main façade is identical on both sides of the arch, consisting of four columns on bases, dividing the structure into a central arch and two lateral arches, the latter being surmounted by two round reliefs over a horizontal frieze. The four columns are of Corinthian order made of Numidian yellow marble (giallo antico), one of which has been transferred into the Basilica di San Giovanni in Laterano and was replaced by a white marble column. The columns stand on bases (plinths or socles), decorated on three sides. The reliefs on the front show Victoria, either inscribing a shield or holding palm branches, while those to the side show captured barbarians alone or with Roman soldiers. Though Constantinian, they are modelled on those of the Arch of Septimius Severus (and the destroyed Arcus novus (Note: The Arcus novus, was erected by Diocletian ca. 314 on the Via lata, one of three triumphal arches on that road, and was destroyed ca. 1491 during reconstruction of Santa Maria in Via Lata. The remains, including the plinths are now in the Boboli Gardens, in Florence.)), and may be considered as a "standard" item. Some scholars have also argued from proportional analysis that the monument’s overall geometry indicates a unified Constantinian construction rather than an earlier full arch that was later rebuilt.

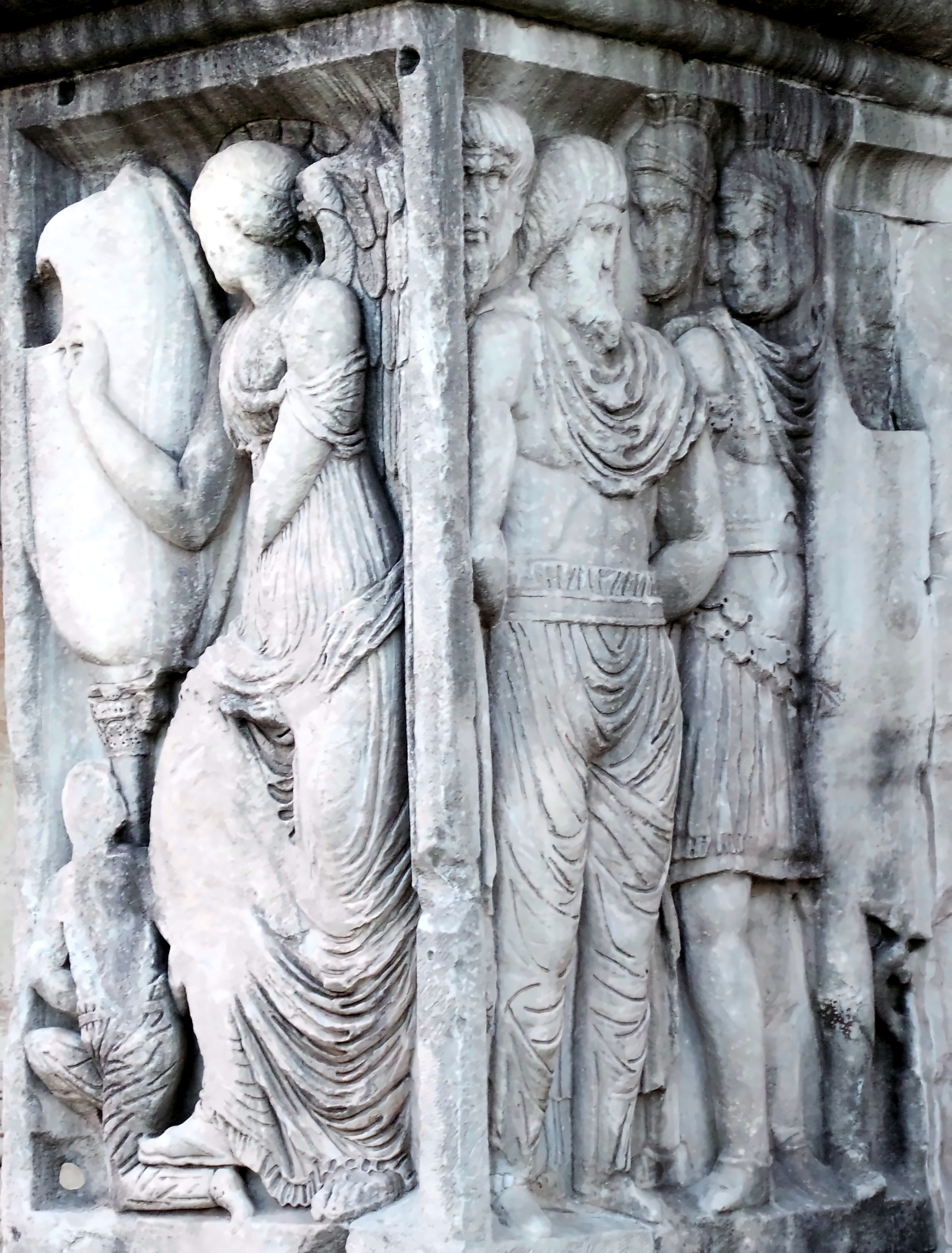
Detail of north plinth on second column from east (see gallery), viewed from east, with Victoria (left), prisoners (right)

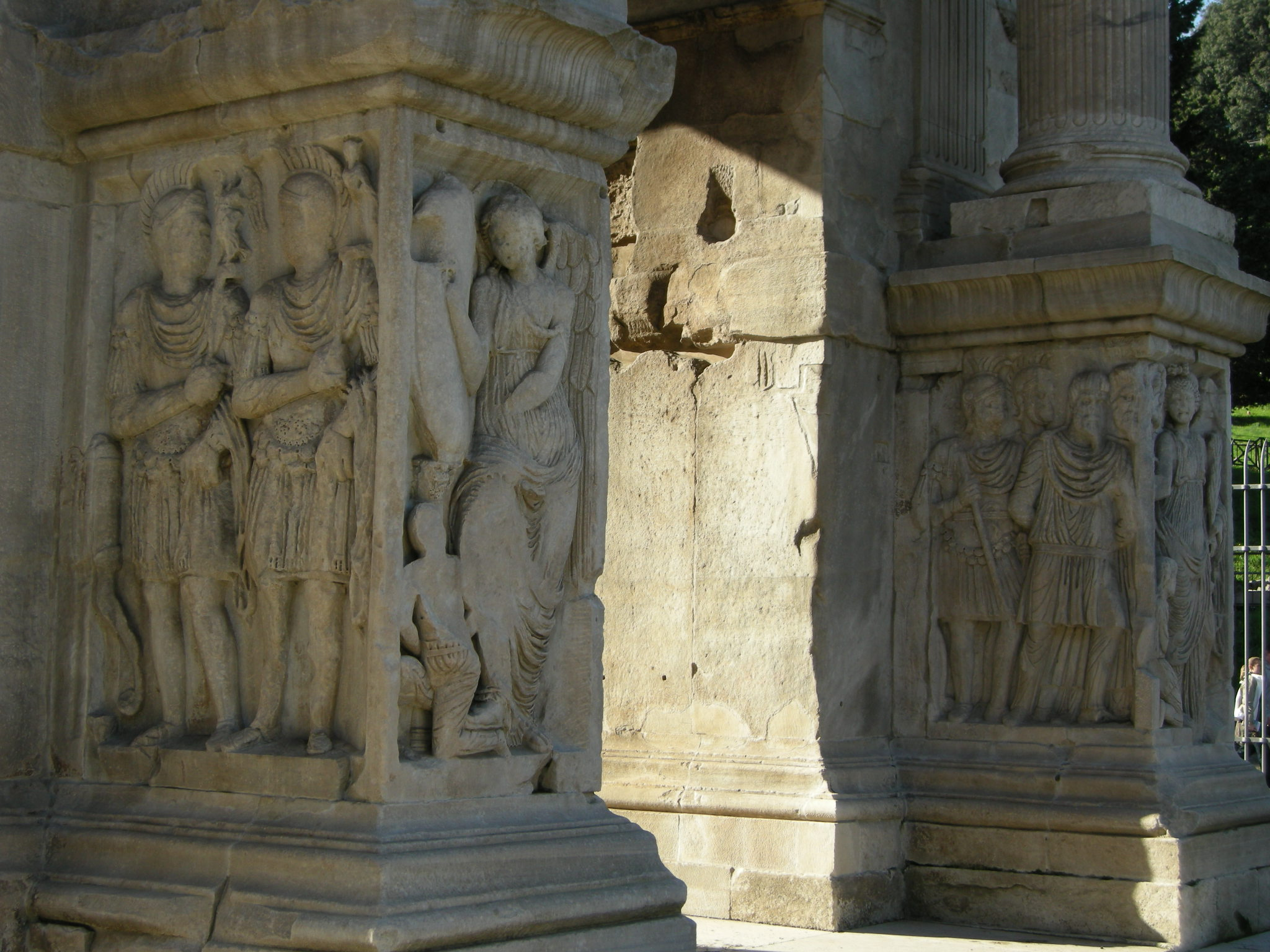
Detail of western plinths (see detail of left plinth in side bar)

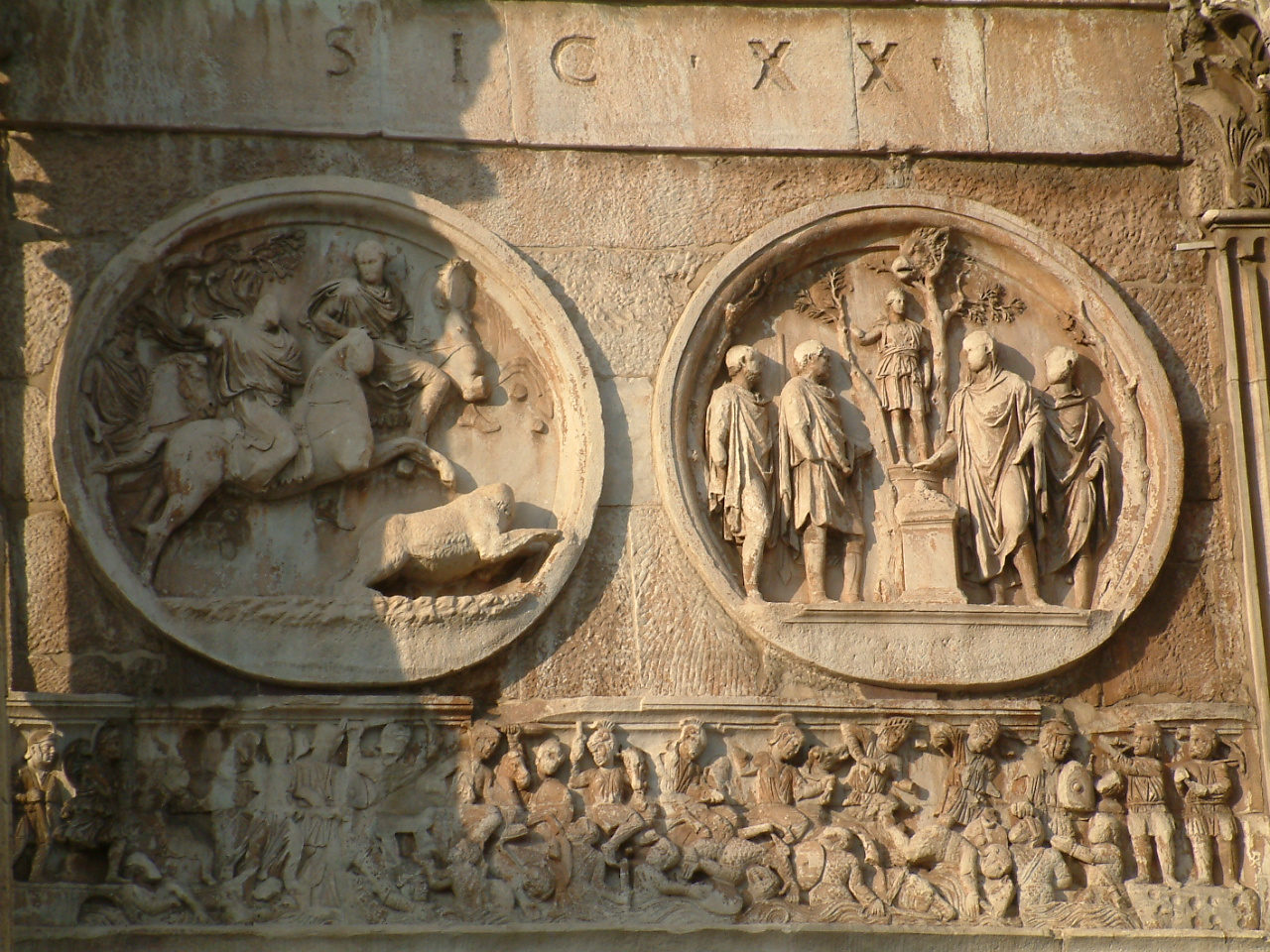
Round reliefs above right lateral archway, from south, over friezes

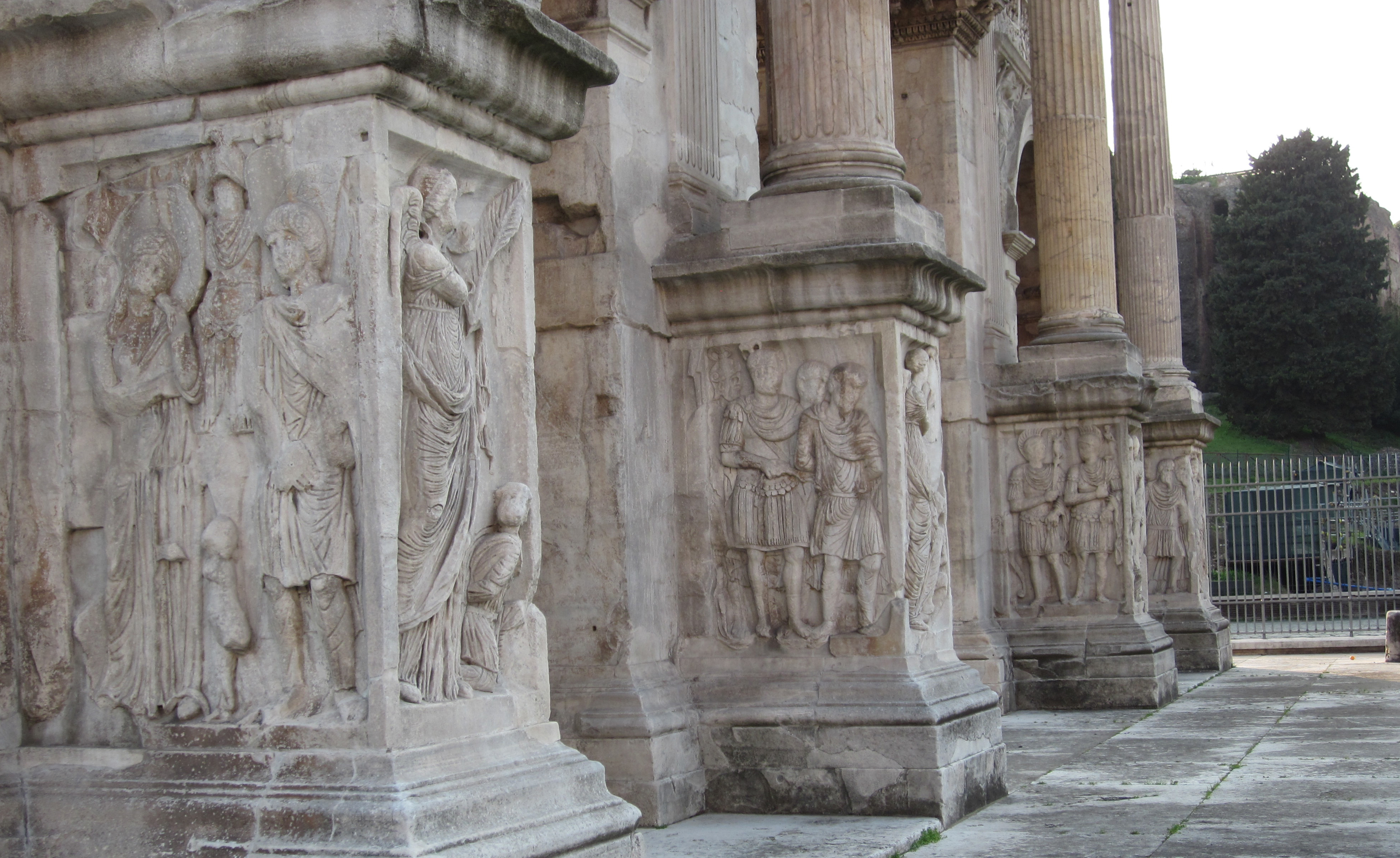
Plinths of columns on north side, looking west (see detail to right)

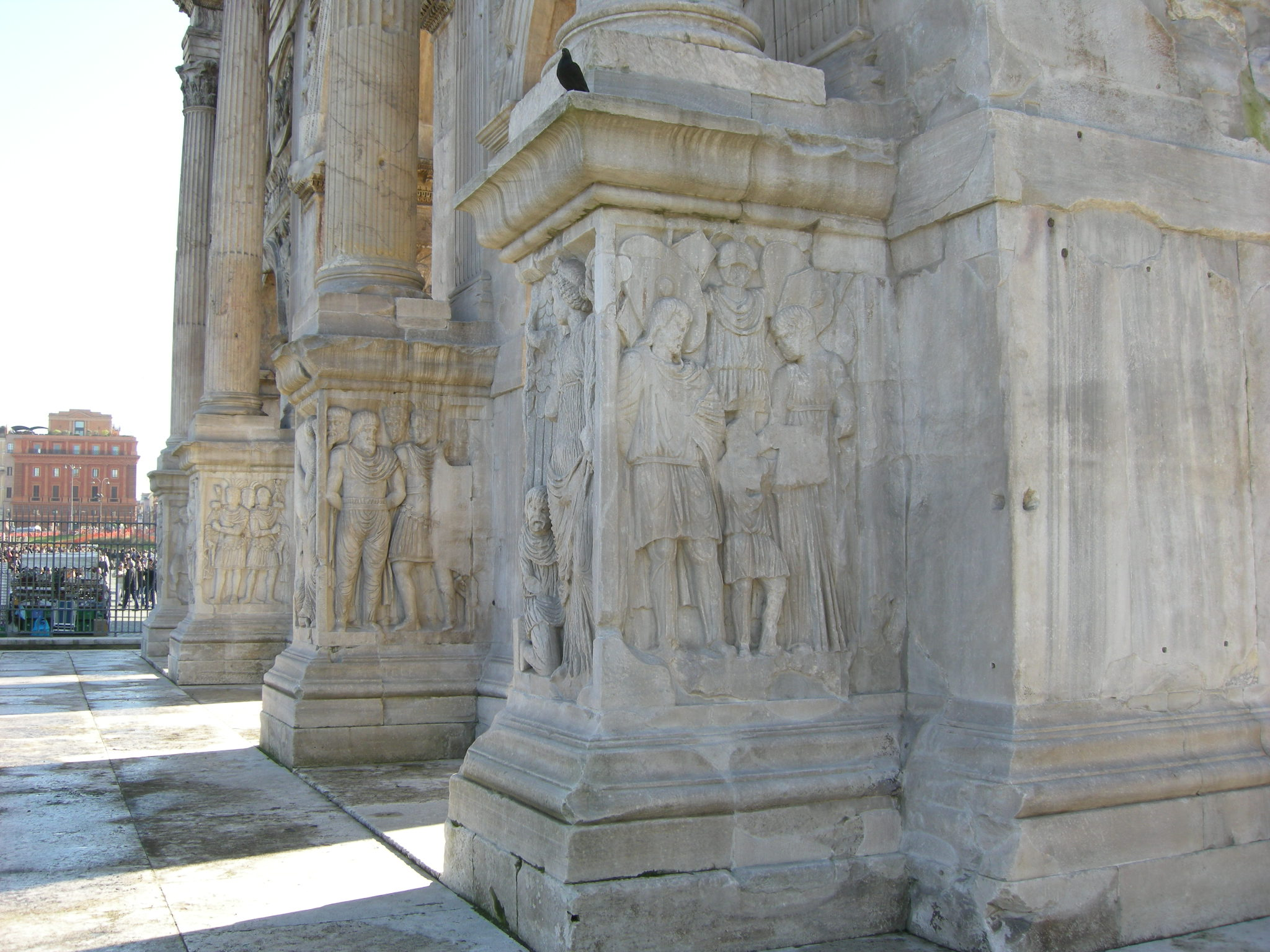
Plinths, north side looking east

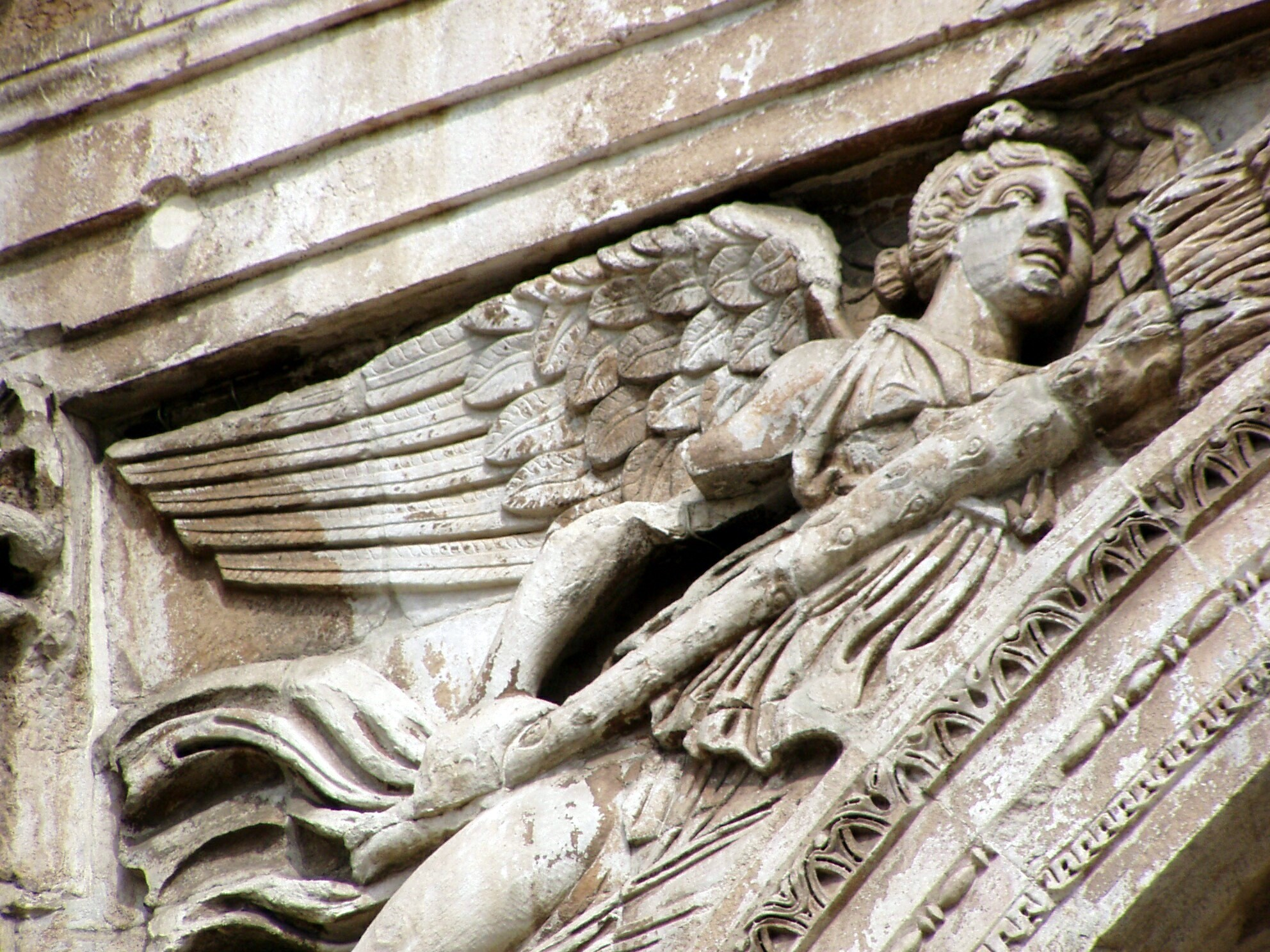
Spandrel over main arch with Victory

The pairs of round reliefs above each lateral archway date to the times of Emperor Hadrian. They display scenes of hunting and sacrificing: (north side, left to right) hunt of a boar, sacrifice to Apollo, hunt of a lion, sacrifice to Hercules. On the south side, the left pair show the departure for the hunt (see below) and sacrifice to Silvanus, while those on the right (illustrated on the right) show the hunt of a bear and sacrifice to Diana. The head of the emperor (originally Hadrian) has been reworked in all medallions: on the north side, into Constantine in the hunting scenes and into Licinius or Constantius I in the sacrifice scenes; on the south side, vice versa. The reliefs, c. 2 m in diameter, were framed in porphyry; this framing is only extant on the right side of the northern façade. Similar medallions, of Constantinian origin, are located on the small sides of the arch; the eastern side shows the Sun rising, on the western side, the Moon. Both are on chariots.

The spandrels of the main archway are decorated with reliefs depicting Victory figures with trophies (illustrated below), those of the smaller archways show river gods. Column bases and spandrel reliefs are from the time of Constantine.

==== Constantinian frieze ====
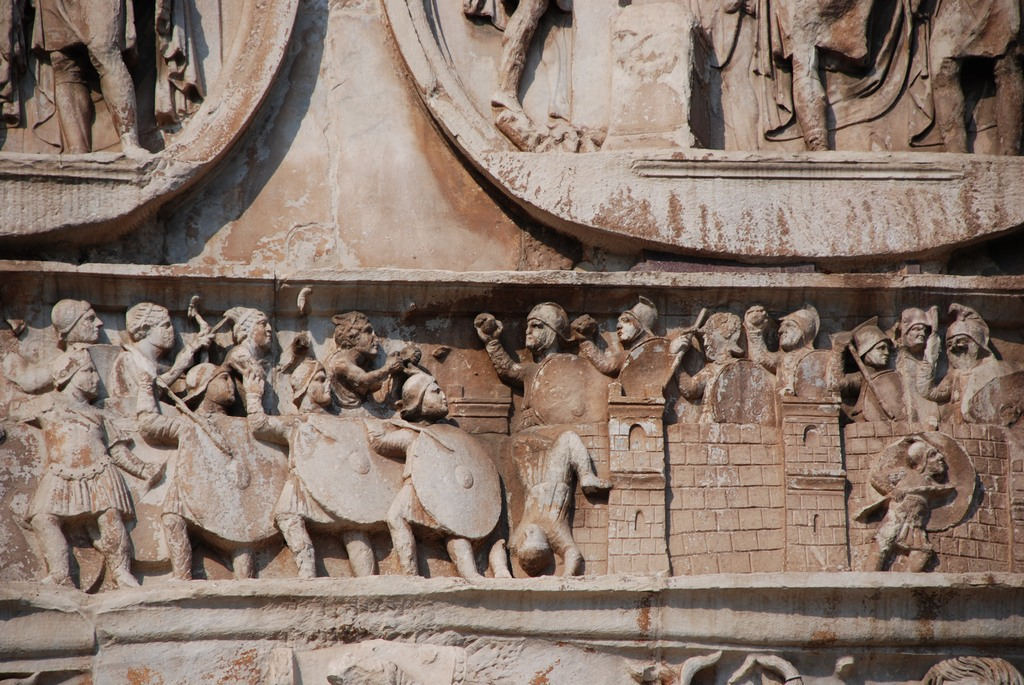
Obsidio (detail)

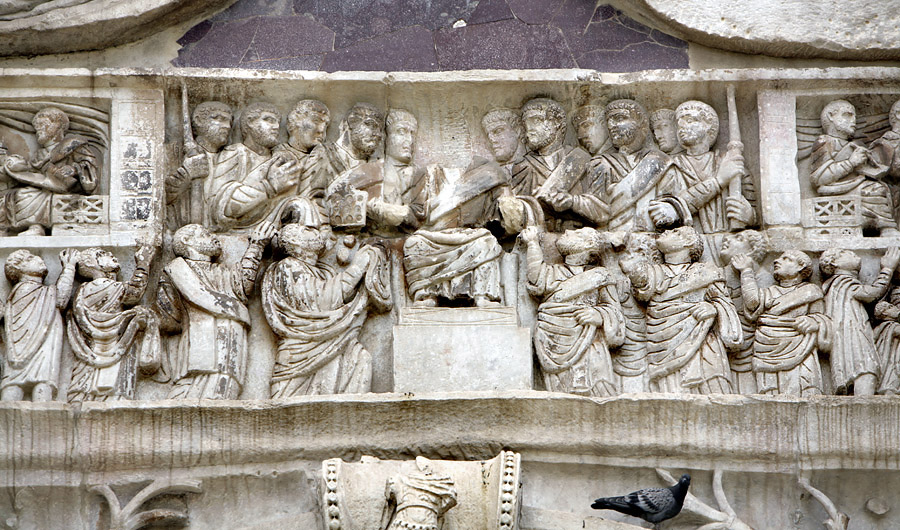
Liberalitas (detail)

The horizontal frieze below the round reliefs are the main parts from the time of Constantine, running around the monument, one strip above each lateral archway and including the west and east sides of the arch. These "historical" reliefs depict scenes from the Italian campaign of Constantine against Maxentius which was the reason for the construction of the monument. Modern scholarship has emphasized that these scenes projected Constantine’s ongoing identity as an armed ruler within Rome; Koortbojian notes that the frieze contributes to “a consistent imagery of the emperor’s martial character.” The frieze starts at the western side with the Departure from Milan (Profectio). It continues on the southern, face, with the Siege of Verona (Obsidio) on the left (South west), an event which was of great importance to the war in Northern Italy. On the right (South east) is depicted the Battle of the Milvian Bridge (Proelium) with Constantine's army victorious and the enemy drowning in the river Tiber. On the eastern side, Constantine and his army enter Rome (Ingressus); the artist seems to have avoided using imagery of the triumph, as Constantine probably did not want to be shown triumphant over the Eternal City. Koortbojian similarly argues that the Constantinian frieze ‘hardly conforms to that of a traditional triumph’, despite the inscription’s reference to triumphi. On the northern face, looking towards the city, are two strips with the emperor's actions after taking possession of Rome. On the left (North east) is Constantine speaking to the citizens on the Roman Forum (Oratio), while to the right (North west) is the final panel with Constantine distributing money to the people (Liberalitas). Rose argues that “if the spoliation of the frieze were to be acknowledged, it would disrupt the proposed program of the arch that has been anchored in place since 1939,” and that “Diocletianic imagery was pulled into the matrix along with spoliated reliefs of Trajan, Hadrian, and Marcus Aurelius, all of which became part of a completely new monument celebrating Constantine’s Decennalia.”

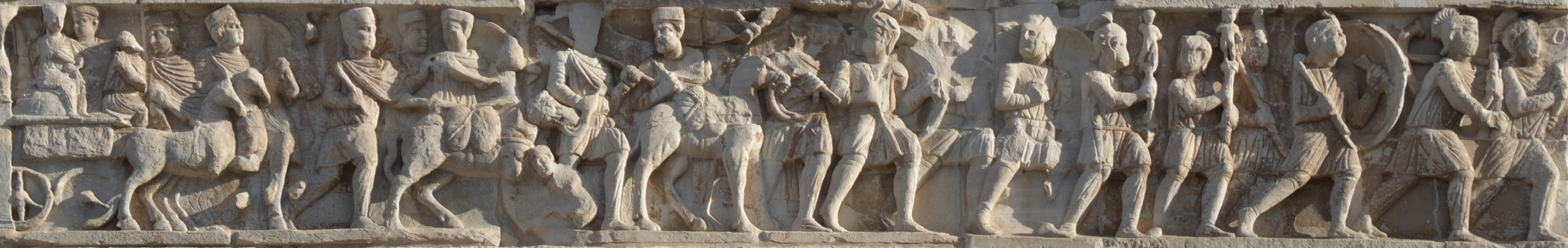
West: Profectio

South west: Obsidio

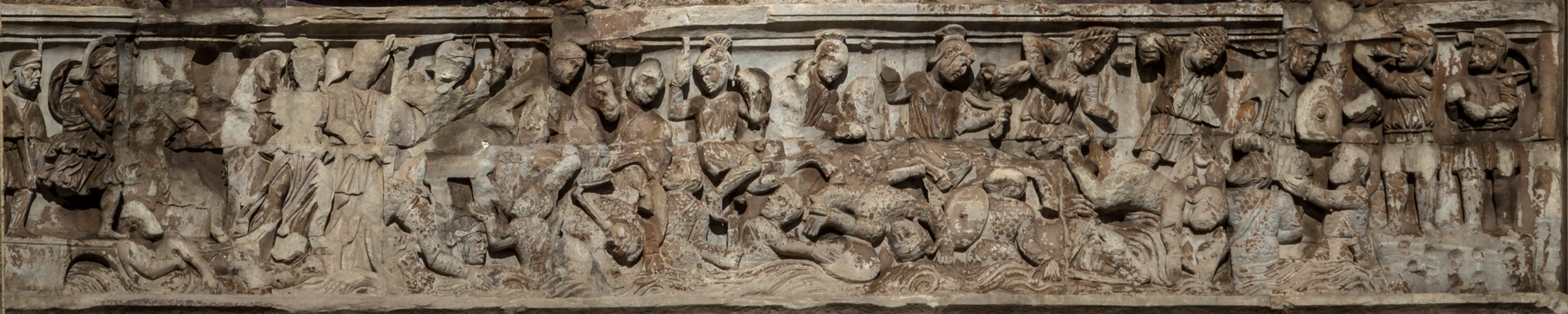
South east: Proelium

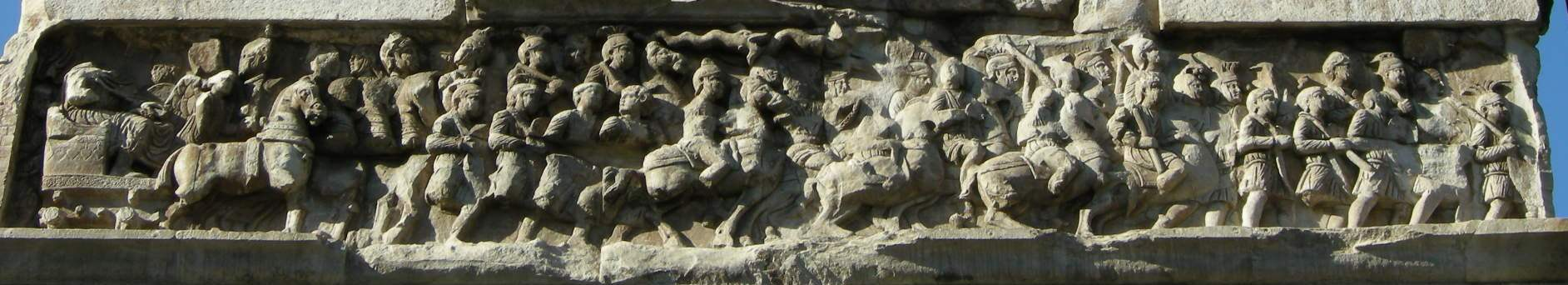
East: Ingressus

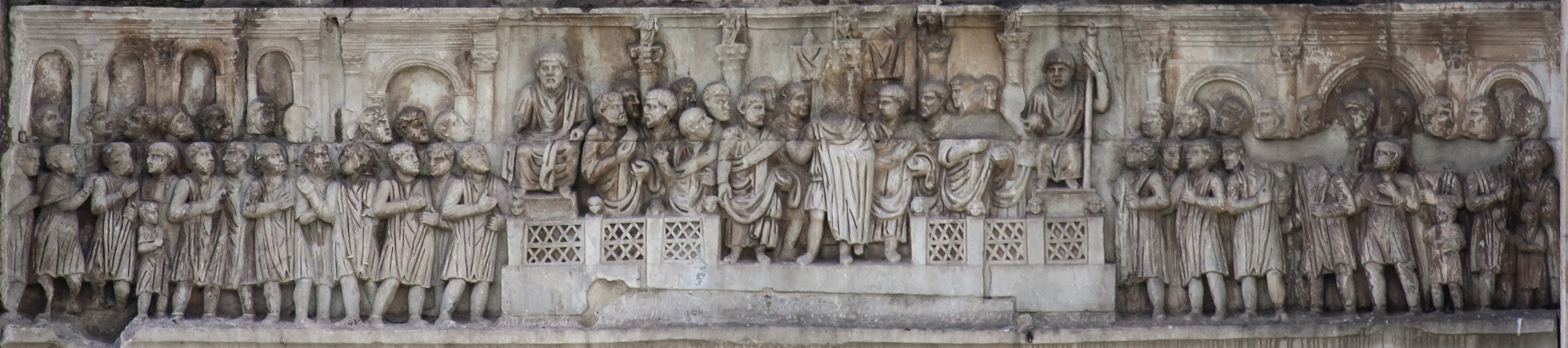
North east: Oratio

North west: Liberalitas

=== Inner sides of the archways ===
Detail of two of the destroyed portrait busts

In the central archway, there is one large panel of Trajan's Dacian War on each wall. Inside the lateral archways are eight portraits busts (two on each wall), destroyed to such an extent that it is no longer possible to identify them.

== Inscriptions ==
The main inscription on the attic would originally have been of bronze letters. It can still be read easily; only the recesses in which the letters occur, and their attachment holes, remain. It reads thus, identically on both sides (with abbreviations completed in parentheses):

IMP(eratori)·CAES(ari)·FL(avio)·CONSTANTINO·MAXIMO
P(io)·F(elici)·AVGVSTO · S(enatus) · P(opulus) · Q(ue) · R(omanus)
QVOD·INSTINCTV·DIVINITATIS·MENTIS
MAGNITVDINE·CVM·EXERCITV·SVO
TAM·DE·TYRANNO·QVAM·DE·OMNI·EIVS
FACTIONE·VNO·TEMPORE·IVSTIS
REMPVBLICAM·VLTVS·EST·ARMIS
ARCVM·TRIVMPHIS·INSIGNEM·DICAVIT

To Imperator Caesar Flavius Constantine, the greatest, pious, blessed Augustus: because he, inspired by the divine, and by the greatness of his mind, has delivered the state from the tyrant and all of his followers at the same time, with his army and just force of arms, the Senate and Roman People have dedicated this arch, decorated with triumphs.

The words instinctu divinitatis ("inspired by the divine") have been greatly commented on. They are usually read as sign of Constantine's shifting religious affiliation: The Christian tradition, most notably Lactantius and Eusebius of Caesarea, relate the story of a vision of God to Constantine during the campaign, and that he was victorious in the sign of the cross at the Milvian Bridge. The official documents (esp. coins) still prominently display another Sun god called Sol Invictus until 324, while Constantine started to support the Christian church from 312 on. In this situation, the vague wording of the inscription can be seen as the attempt to please all possible readers, being deliberately ambiguous, and acceptable to both pagans and Christians. As was customary, the vanquished enemy is not mentioned by name, but only referred to as "the tyrant", drawing on the notion of the rightful killing of a tyrannical ruler; together with the image of the "just war", it serves as justification of Constantine's civil war against Maxentius.

Two short inscriptions on the inside of the central archway transport a similar message: Constantine came not as conqueror, but freed Rome from occupation:

LIBERATORI VRBIS (to the liberator of the city) — FVNDATORI QVIETIS (to the founder of peace)

Over each of the small archways, inscriptions read:

VOTIS·X· — VOTIS·XX·
SIC·X· — SIC·XX·

They give a hint on the date of the arch: "Solemn vows for the 10th anniversary – for the 20th anniversary" and "as for the 10th, so for the 20th anniversary". Both refer to Constantine's decennalia, i.e. the 10th anniversary of his reign (counted from 306), which he celebrated in Rome in the summer of 315. It can be assumed that the arch honouring his victory was inaugurated during his stay in the city.

== Works modeled on or inspired by the Arch of Constantine ==
- Brandenburg Gate (1770) – Potsdam, Prussia
- Arc de Triomphe du Carrousel (1806) – Paris
- Arcul de Triumf (1922) – Bucharest
- Marble Arch (1828) – London
- Arcade du Cinquantenaire (1905) – Brussels
- Washington Union Station (1908) – Washington, D.C.
- American Museum of Natural History, east façade (1936) – New York City
- Bond University (1989) – Gold Coast, Australia
- Kedleston Hall – Derbyshire, England
- Church of Saint-Denis, façade – Paris
- Arch of triumph – Pyongyang, North Korea
- Pitzhanger Manor – Ealing, London
- Siegestor – Munich
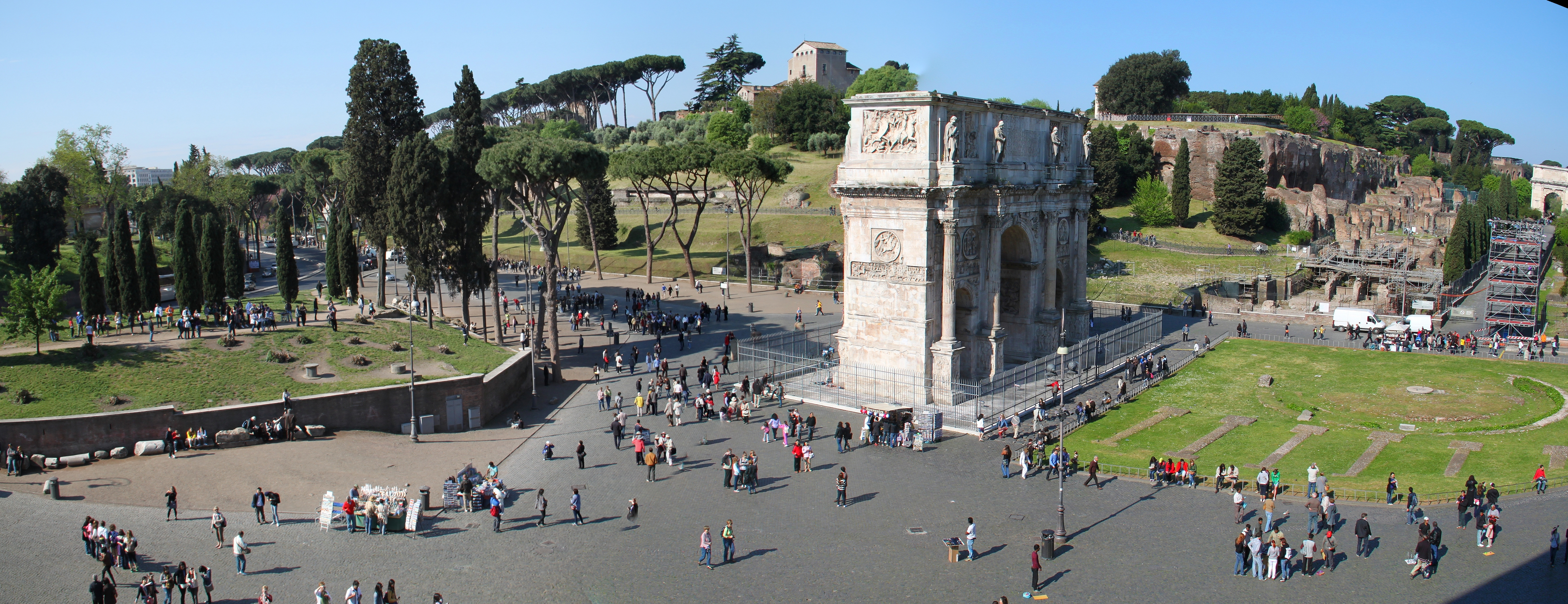
Arch of Constantine, viewed from the Colosseum looking south west to Palatine Hill

== See also ==
- Aqua Alexandrina – Roman aqueduct, a landmark of Rome, Italy
- Arch of Dolabella – Ancient Roman arch, a landmark of Rome, Italy
- List of ancient monuments in Rome
- List of Roman triumphal arches

== Citations ==
Preceded by Obelisk of Montecitorio	Landmarks of Rome; Arch of Constantine	Succeeded by Arch of Drusus
