= Herman van Swanevelt =

Dutch painter (1603 – 1655)

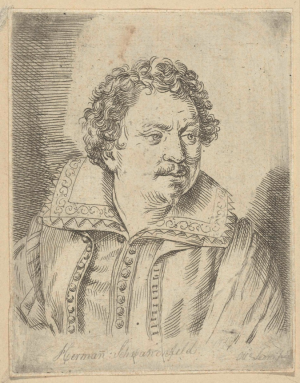
- Self-portrait
- Born: 1603; Woerden
- Died: 1655 (aged 51–52); Paris
- Known for: Painting

Herman van Swanevelt (1603 – 1655) was a Dutch painter and etcher from the Baroque era.

== Life ==
Herman was born in Woerden to a family of thriving artisans whose ancestors included the famous painter Lucas van Leyden. The identity of Swanevelt’s teacher remains a mystery. A new hypothesis suggests that he was a pupil of Willem Buytewech.

He painted his first signed and dated works in 1623 in Paris. In 1629 he moved to Rome, where he painted many landscapes, and introduced a new type of idyllic landscape with sunlit 'contrejours' reflecting the times of day. Swanevelt became a member of the Bentvueghels; his alias was "heremiet", while he preferred to work alone.

Created and developed by Paul Bril and Cornelis van Poelenburch from 1600 onward, the genre of the “Italianate landscape” entered its classical phase in the 1630s with the advent of Swanevelt and his friends and contemporaries Pieter van Laer and Claude Lorrain. His paintings became very popular and the Barberini family, Pope Urban VIII and the Vatican offered him commissions, like in the monastery of Monte Cassino. Along with Lorrain and others, he also painted landscapes for Philip IV of Spain's new Buen Retiro Palace in Madrid.

In 1641 he returned to Paris, where he remained except for occasional visits to his birthplace Woerden. He became a member of the Académie Royale de Peinture et de Sculpture in 1651. He assisted in the decoration of the Hôtel Lambert and made numerous drawings and etchings. His patrons in France were Cardinal Richelieu and King Louis XIV. Swanevelt lived in Rue du Temple when he died.

== Art ==
During the beginning of the 1630s his development runs parallel to Claude's, and in some ways even anticipates it. During the thirties Swanevelt refined his idyllic landscape style. Swanevelt was an important link between the first generation of Dutch italianate painters, such as Cornelis van Poelenburch and Bartholomeus Breenbergh, and those of the second generation who imitated his monumental compositions and his treatment of southern sunlight. In the last decade of his life when Swanevelt made a few trips to Woerden, he also painted Dutch scenery, but with the typical southern sunlight.

== Works ==
For a long time the only murals attributed to Swanevelt were the two lunettes in the sacristy of Santa Maria sopra Minerva, of which only one survived. Art historian Susan Russell proposed that a frieze with seven scenes from the life of the Old Testament's Joseph in the east wing of Palazzo Pamphilj in Piazza Navona was also painted by him. One of Swanevelt's etchings, "The Birth of Adonis" (1654), resides in the Utah Museum of Fine Art's permanent collection.

== Gallery ==
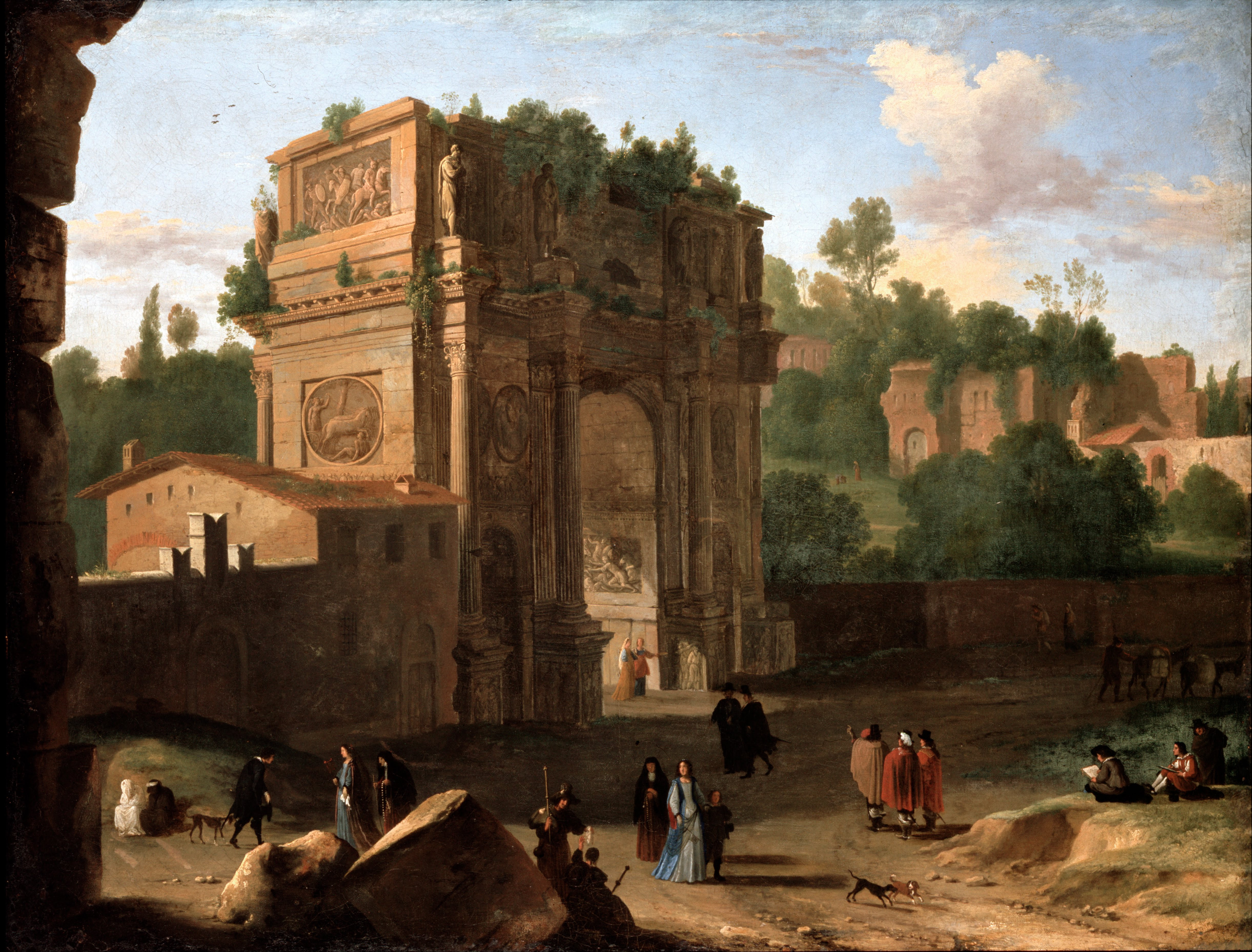
The Arch of Constantine, Rome

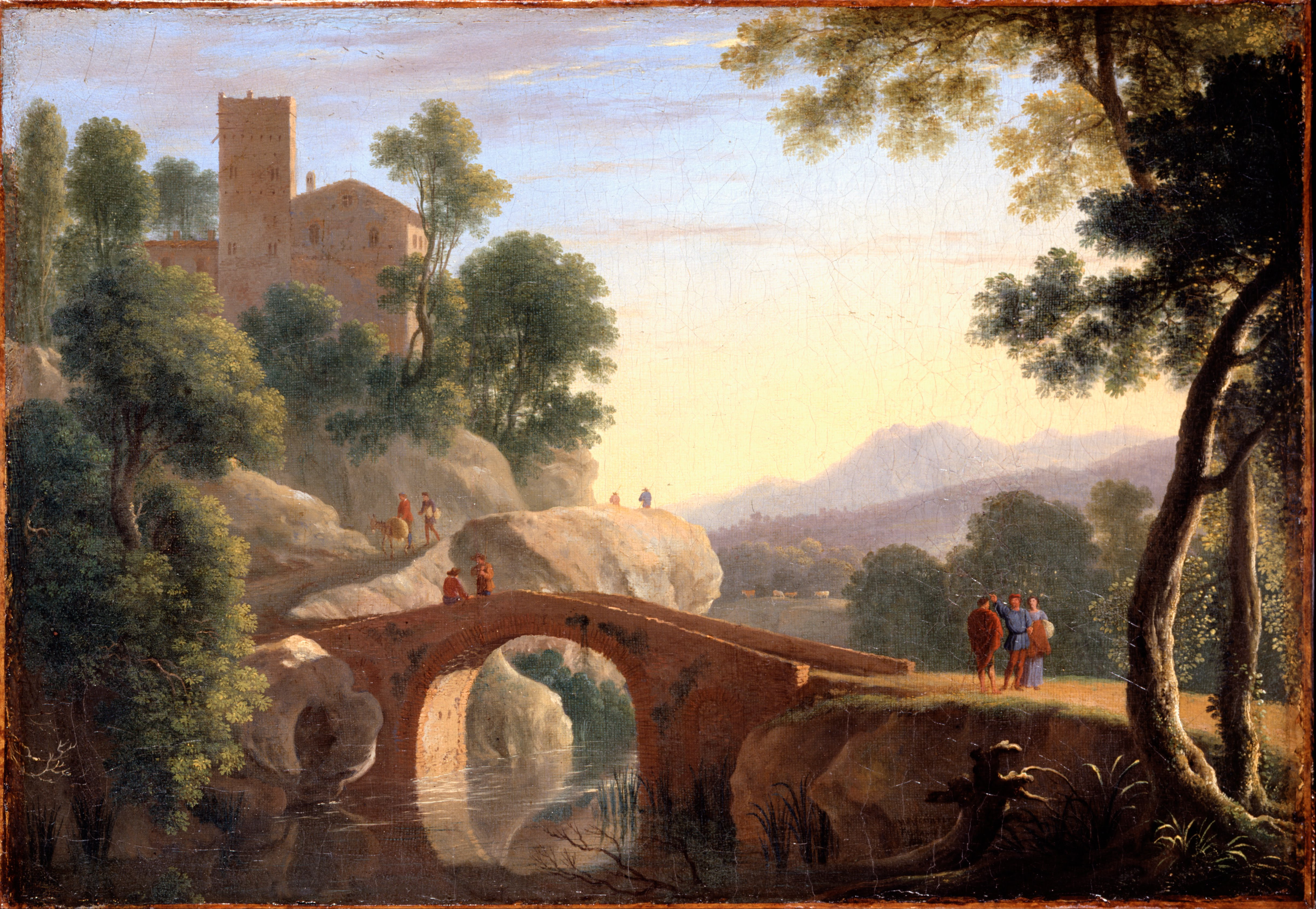
An Italian Landscape with a Bridge

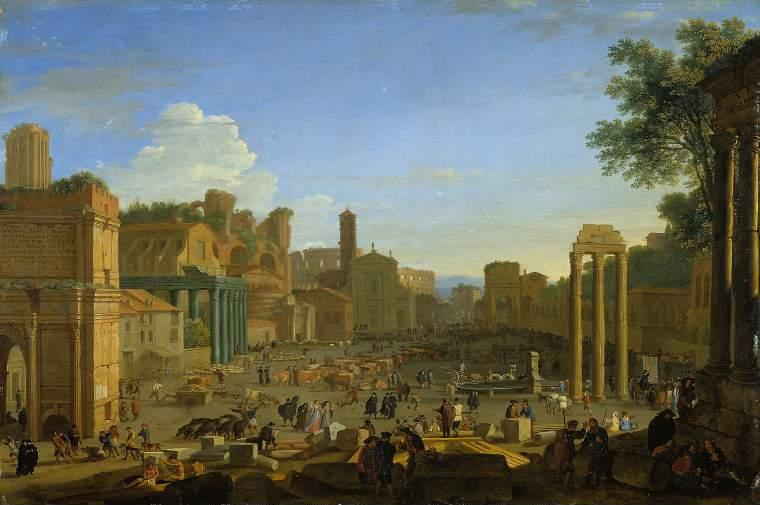
The Campo Vaccino

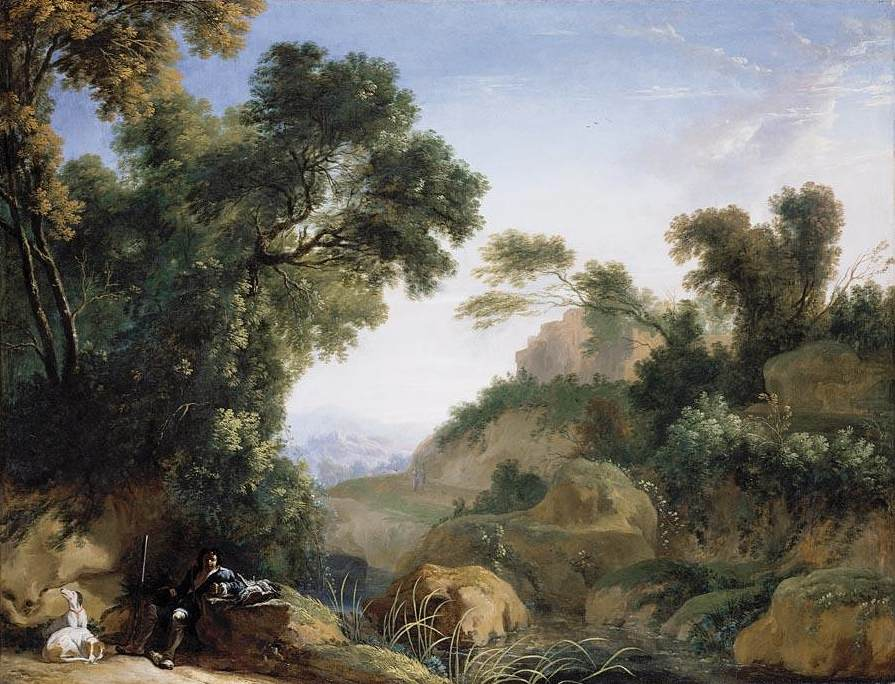
A Huntsman at Rest

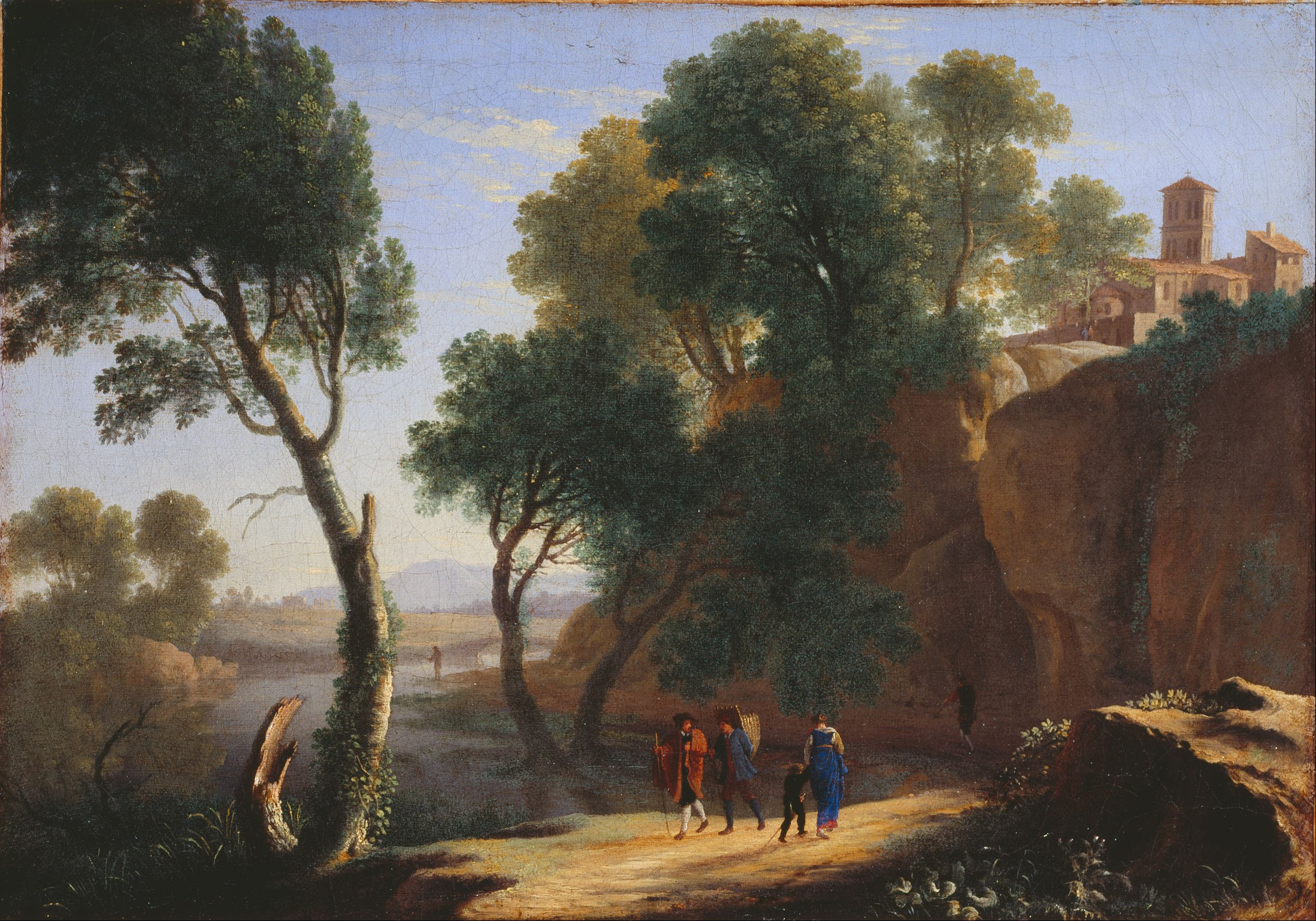
An Italian Landscape
