= Aqua Alexandrina =

Roman aqueduct, a landmark of Rome, Italy

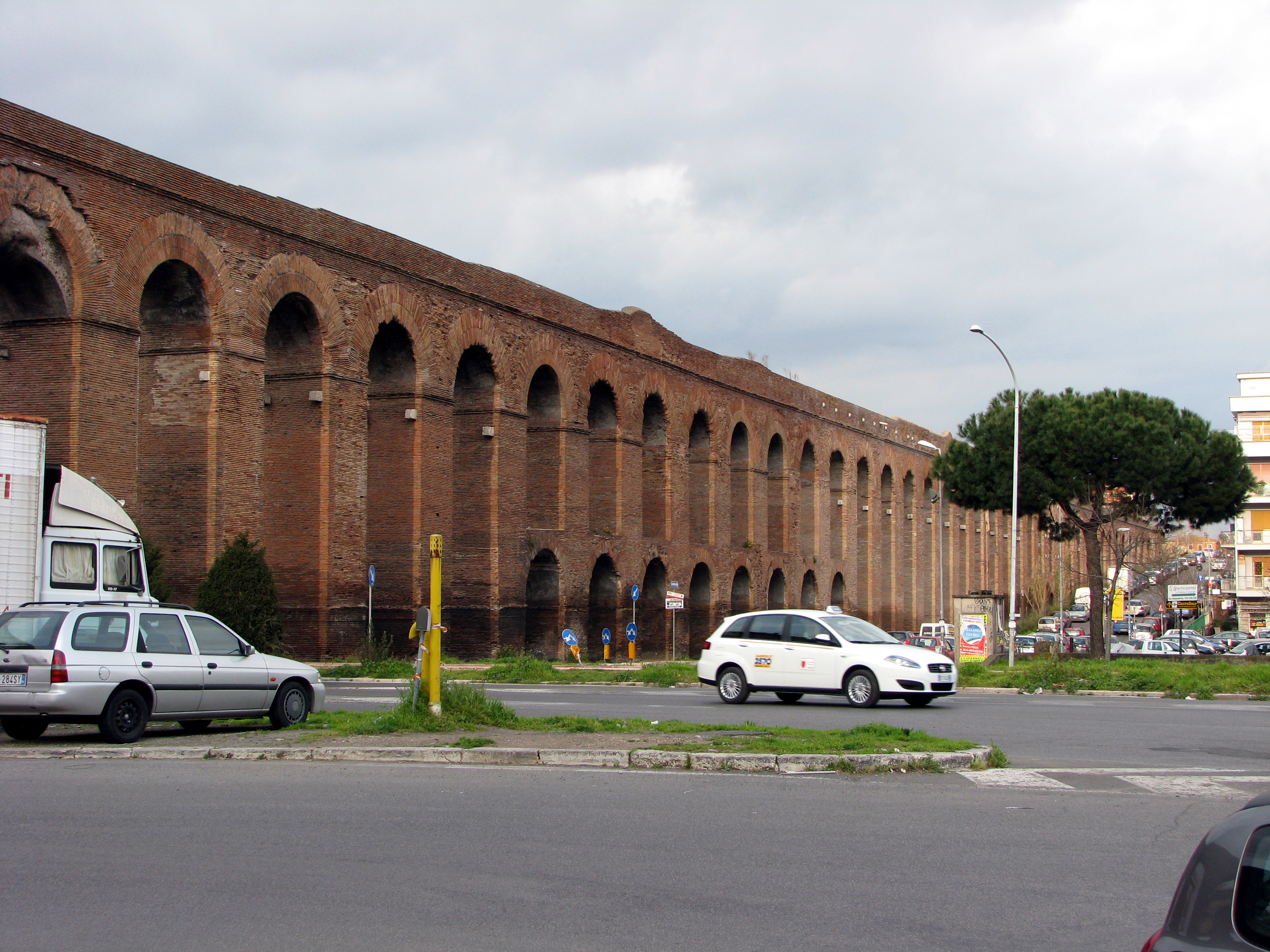
- Aqua Alexandrina crossing Viale Palmiro Togliatti where the arches are the highest
- Click on the map for a fullscreen view
- 41°52′42″N 12°34′24″E

The Aqua Alexandrina (Italian: Acquedotto alessandrino) was a Roman aqueduct located in the city of Rome. The 22.4 km long aqueduct carried water from Pantano Borghese to the Baths of Alexander on the Campus Martius. It remained in use from the 3rd to the 8th century AD.

== History ==
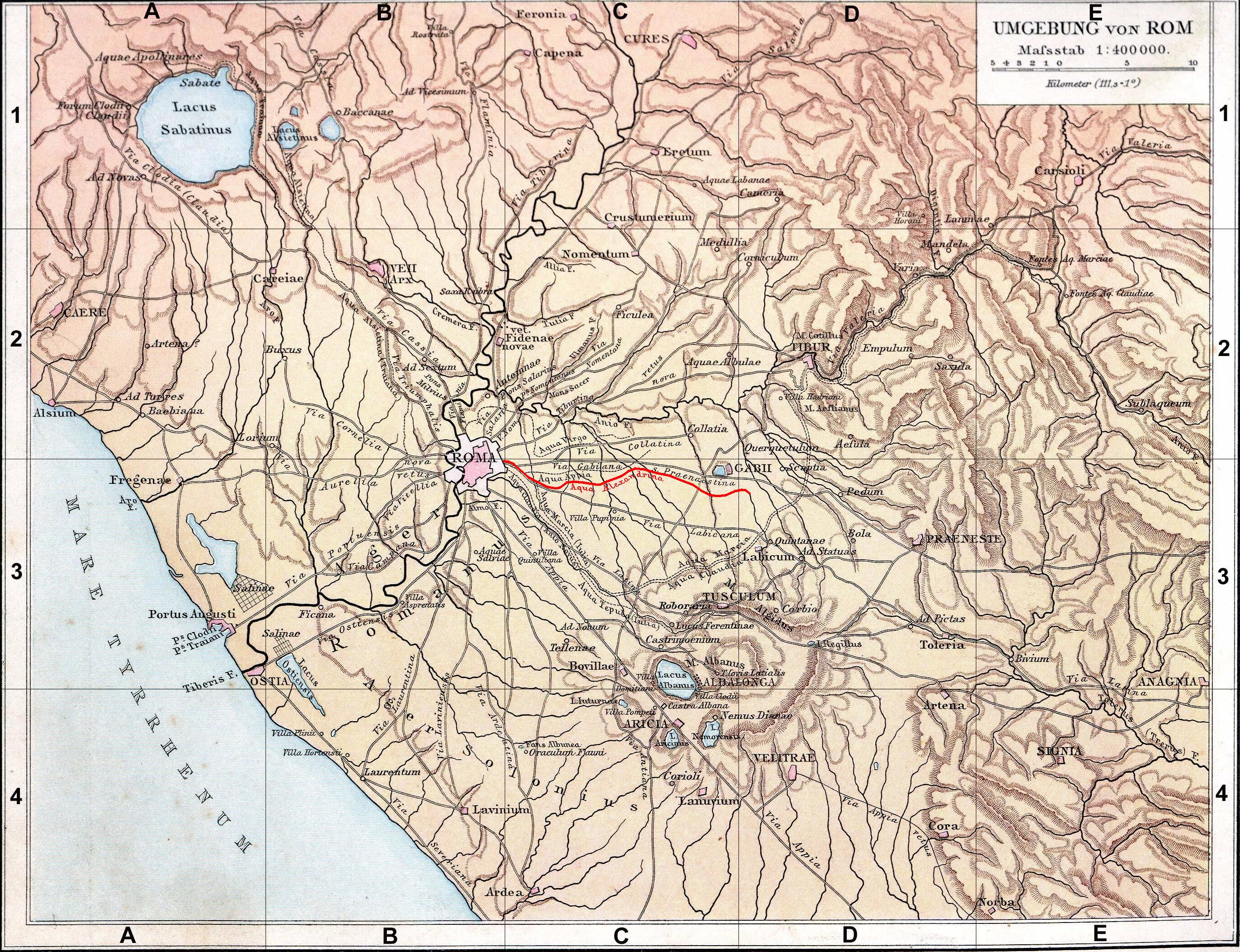
Map of the Aqua Alexandrina outside of Rome

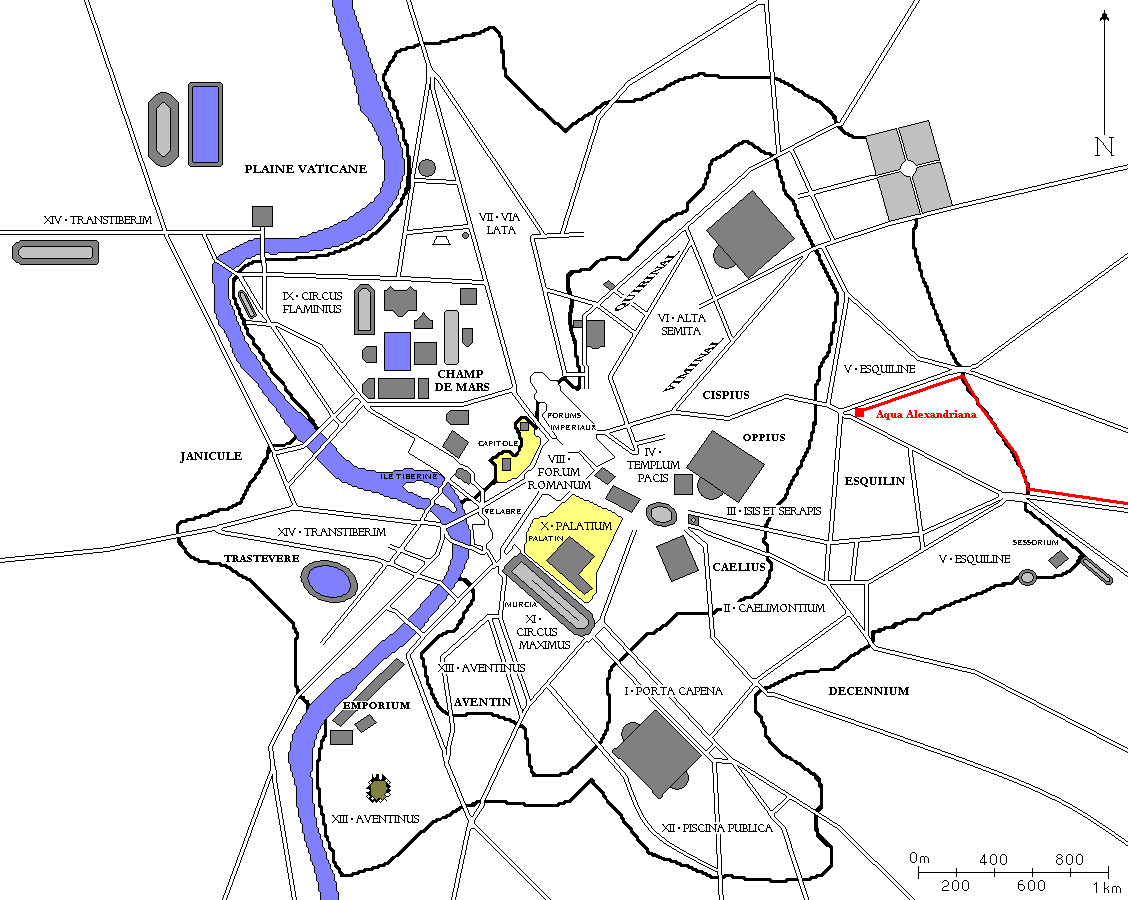
Aqua Alexandrina in Rome

The aqueduct was constructed in AD 226 as the last of the eleven ancient aqueducts of Rome. It was built under the reign of Emperor Alexander Severus to supply his enlargement of the Baths of Nero, which were renamed Thermae Alexandrinae. The aqueduct was repaired for the first time in the era of Diocletian between the 3rd and 4th century, later between the 5th and 6th century and finally in the 8th century during the reign of Pope Adrian I. The aqueduct was described in the 17th century by Raffaello Fabretti (1680).

== Route ==
The Aqua Alexandrina received its water from the Pantano Borghese swamp near the city of Gabii, now a part of Monte Compatri. The same spring has supplied the Acqua Felice since 1586. The first 6.4 km of the total 22.4 km were tunnelled underground, later run on the surface and 2.4 km was carried on brick arches traversing the valleys of the Roman Campagna.

Some of its last section inside the city remains uncertain but the aqueduct entered the city at Porta Maggiore and ended on the Campus Martius at the Thermae of Alexander, between the Pantheon and the Piazza Navona.

== Technical details ==
Depending on the season, the aqueduct supplied 120,000 to 320,000 cubic meters of water per day.

The arches of the aqueduct are made of concrete with brick coating. There are four small travertine brackets at the top of each pillar whose function remains unknown.

== Remains ==
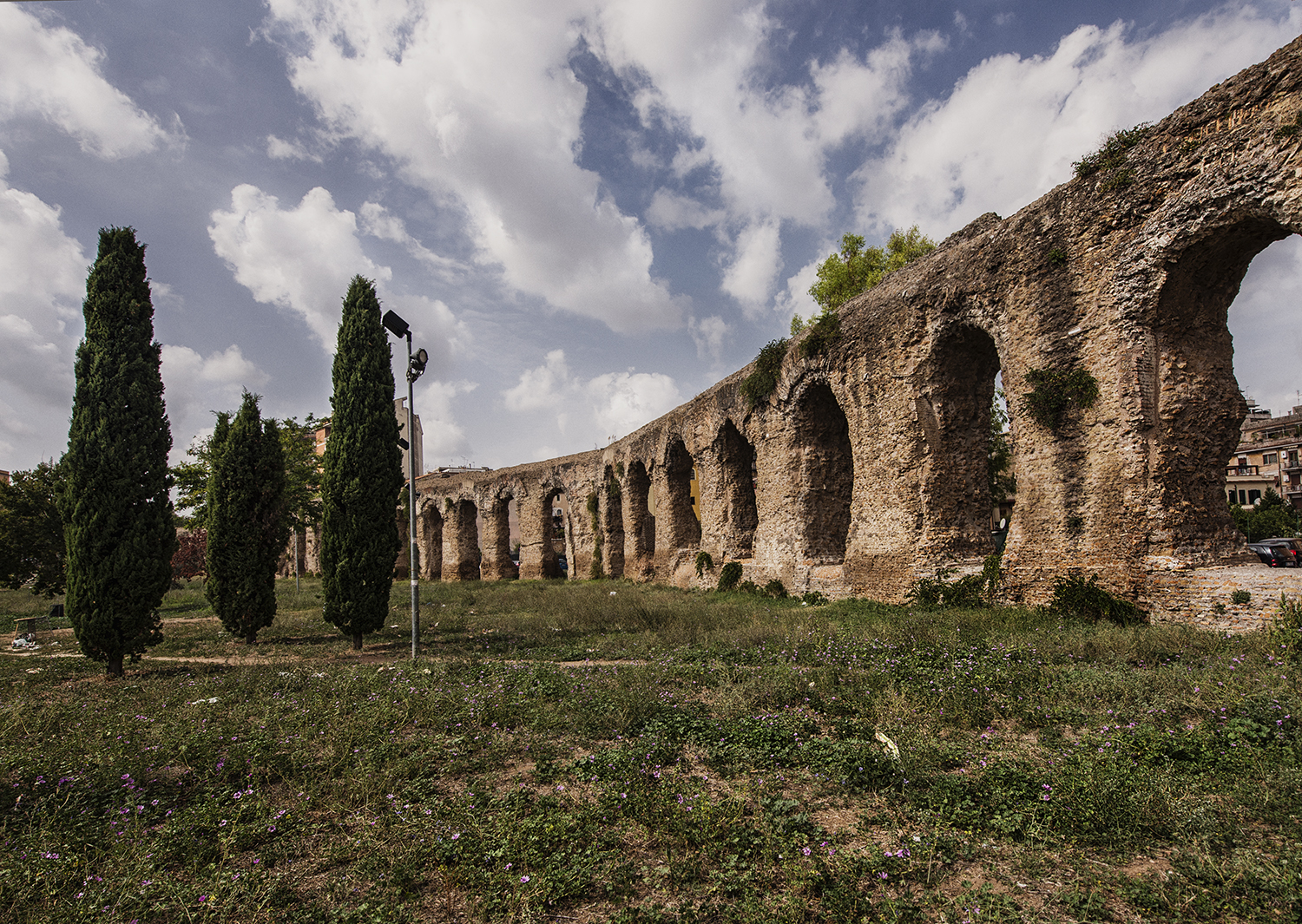
Aqueduct Alexandrina

The longest continuous above-ground stretch of the aqueduct runs through the district of Centocelle along Via dei Pioppi and Via degli Olmi. Monumental arches are looming above busy Viale Palmiro Togliatti north of Via Casilina. The road runs along the old ditch of Centocelle (Fosso di Centocelle) where the arches reached a height of 20–25 m. Formerly the crossing was an impressive feature of the Roman countryside but now it is totally surrounded by a densely built residential neighbourhood. The brick surface is very well preserved here contrary to the other sections which were heavily eroded.

A second longest visible stretch runs along Via dell'Acquedotto Alessandrino south of Via Casilina. The arches carried the aqueduct through a valley with the lowest point at the crossing of present-day Via Carlo Della Rocca. The ruins are surrounded by houses and a public park called Parco Giordano Sangalli. The arched stretch ends at the crossing with Via di Tor Pignattara.

It is possible to follow the aqueduct from Centocelle towards Pantano Borghese through open fields and scattered farmsteads until the Grande Raccordo Anulare, the great ring road of Rome. There are significantly lower arched stretches at the crossing points of ditches and hollows for example behind the Tor Tre Teste housing estate where a public park was established around the ruins.

== Gallery ==
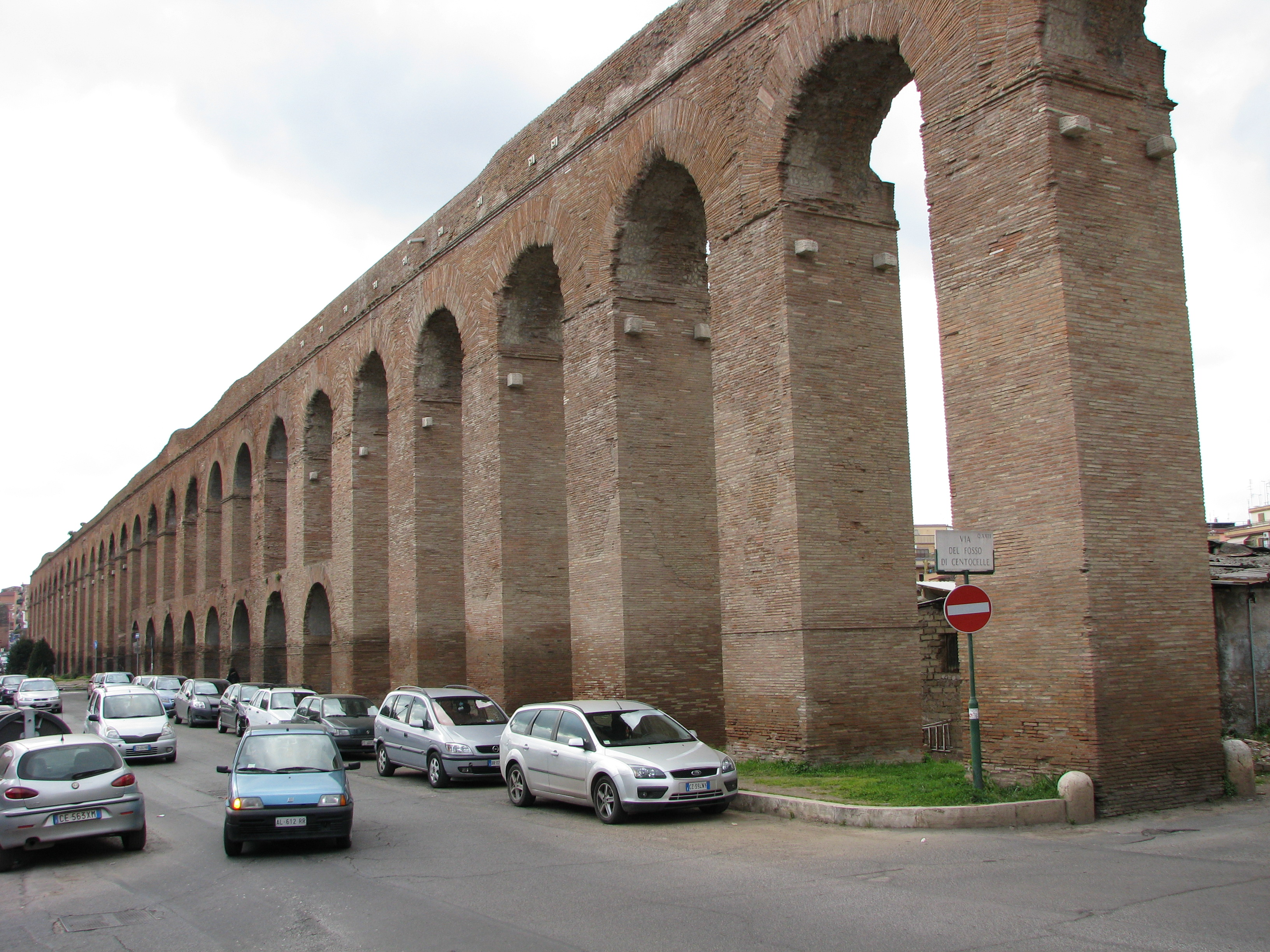
View at the crossing of Fosso di Centocelle

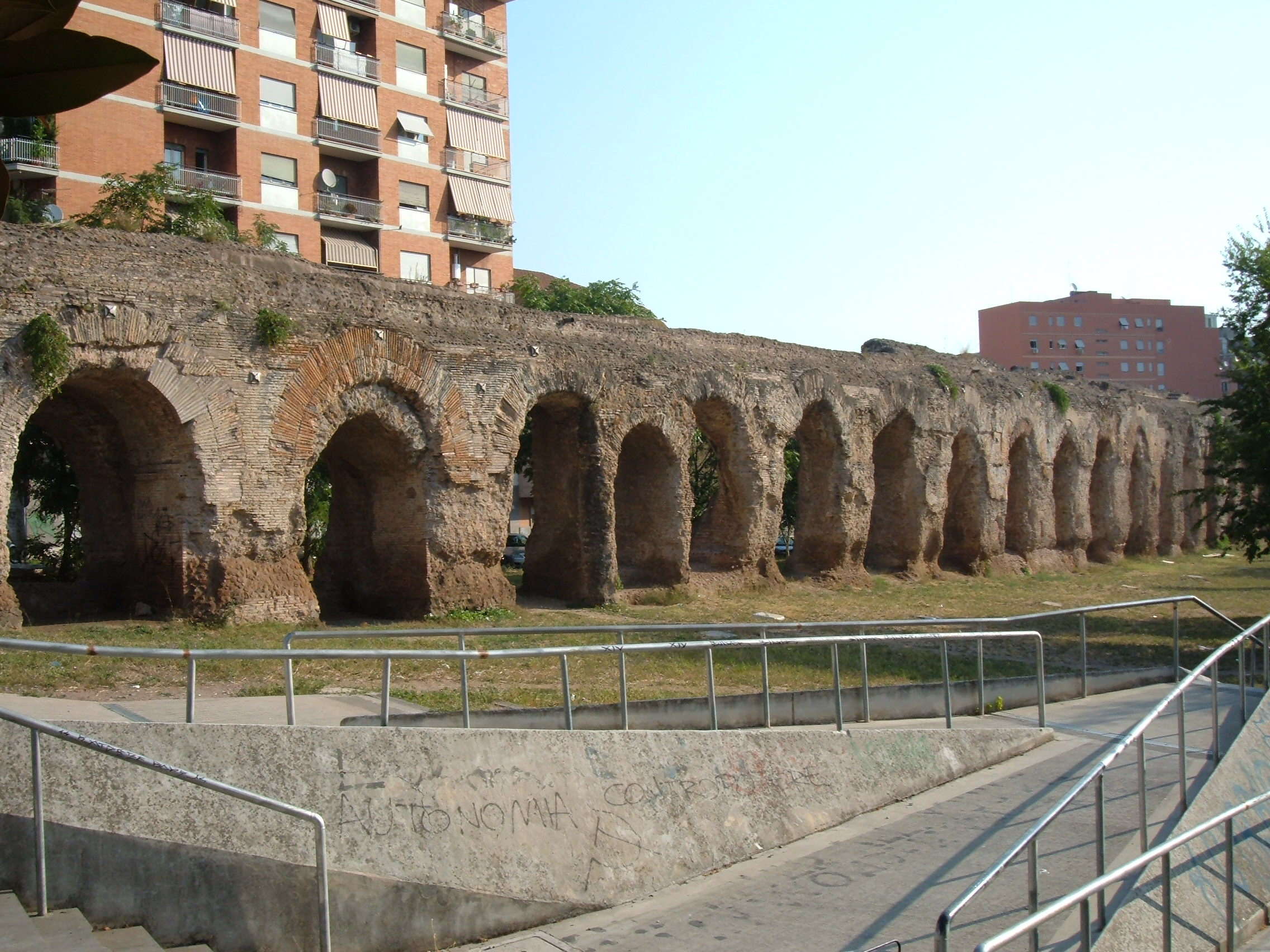
The section inside Torpignattara district

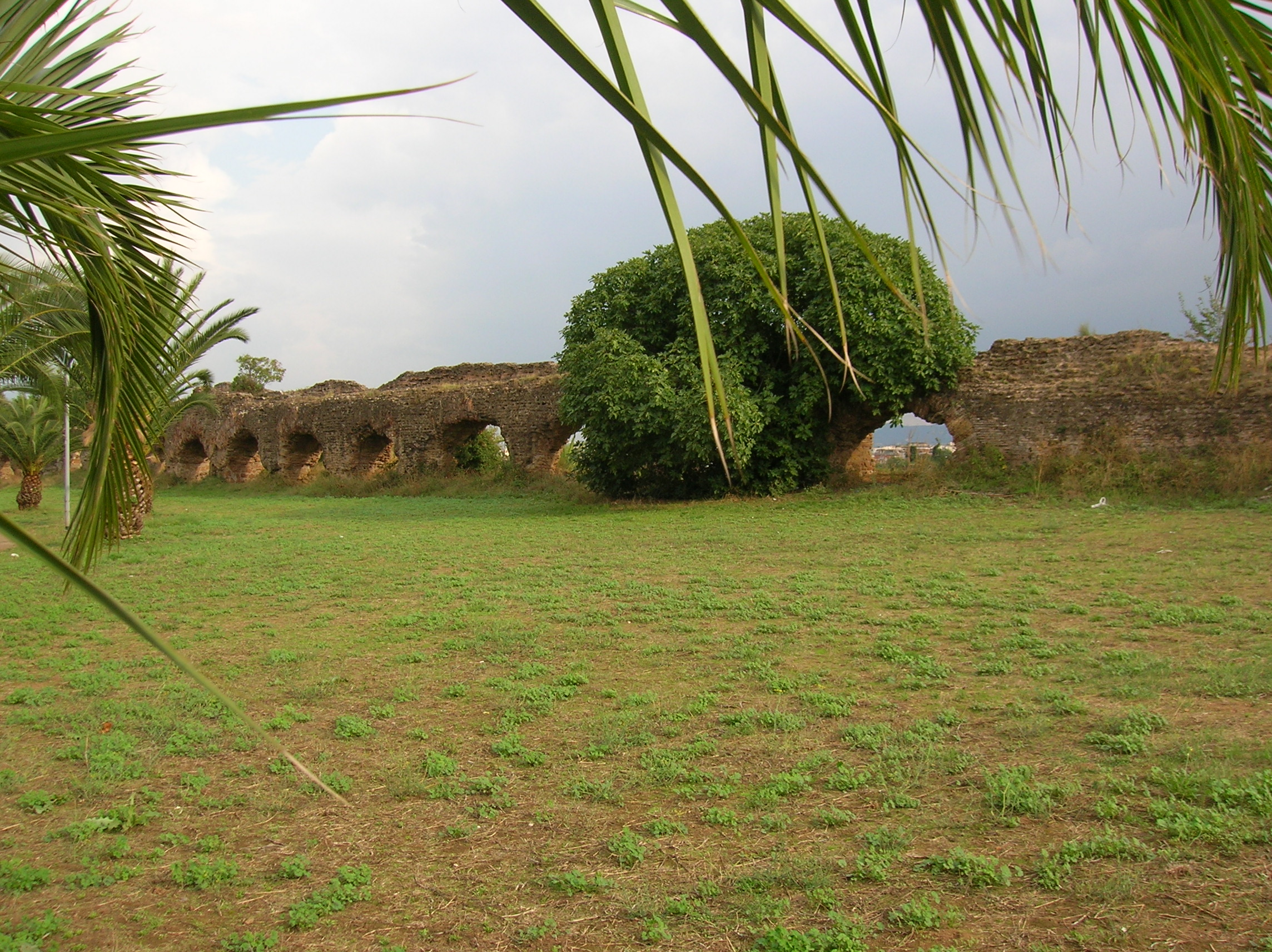
Ruins near Tor Tre Teste

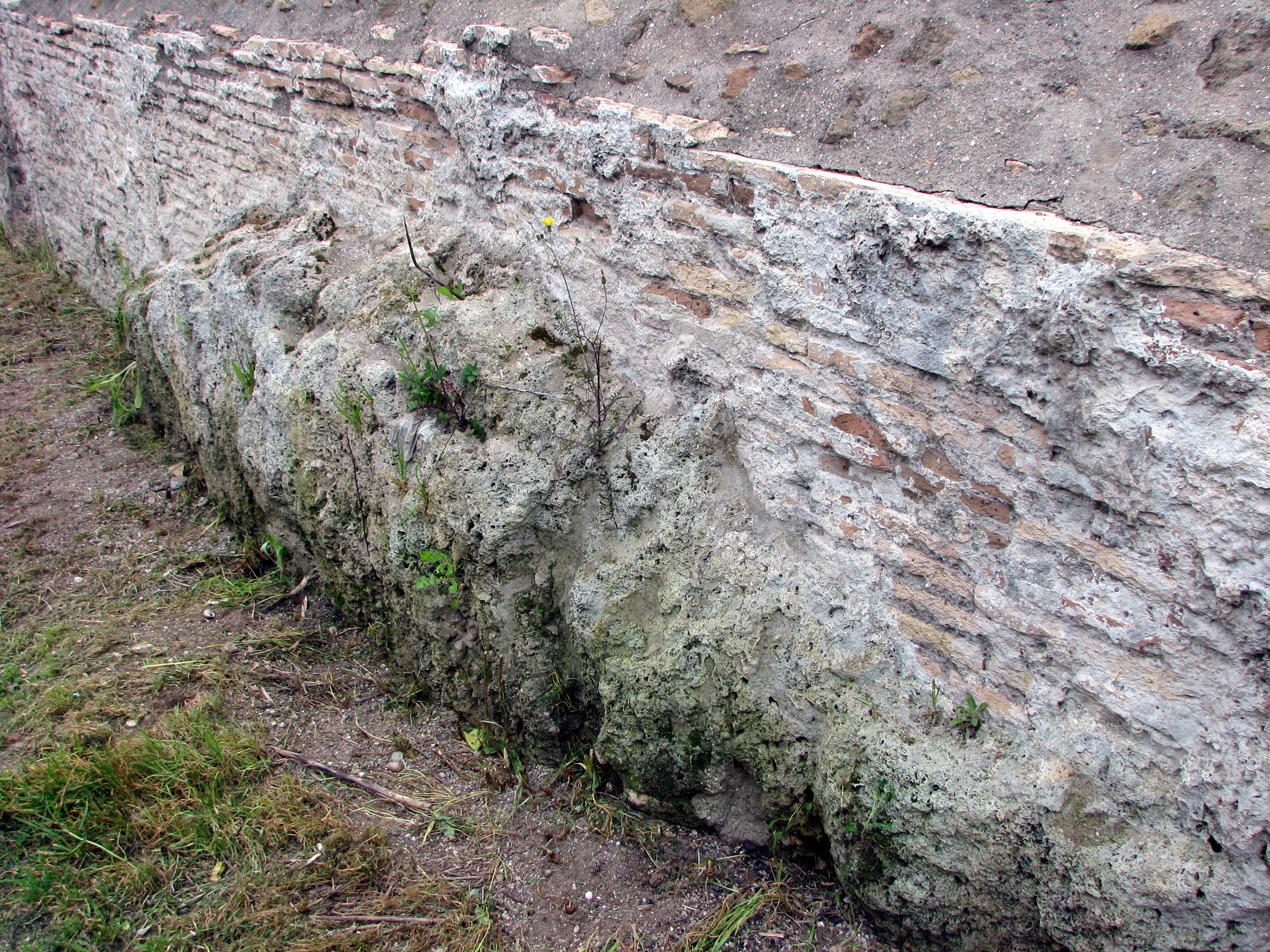
Chalk formation indicating that the aqueduct was leaking

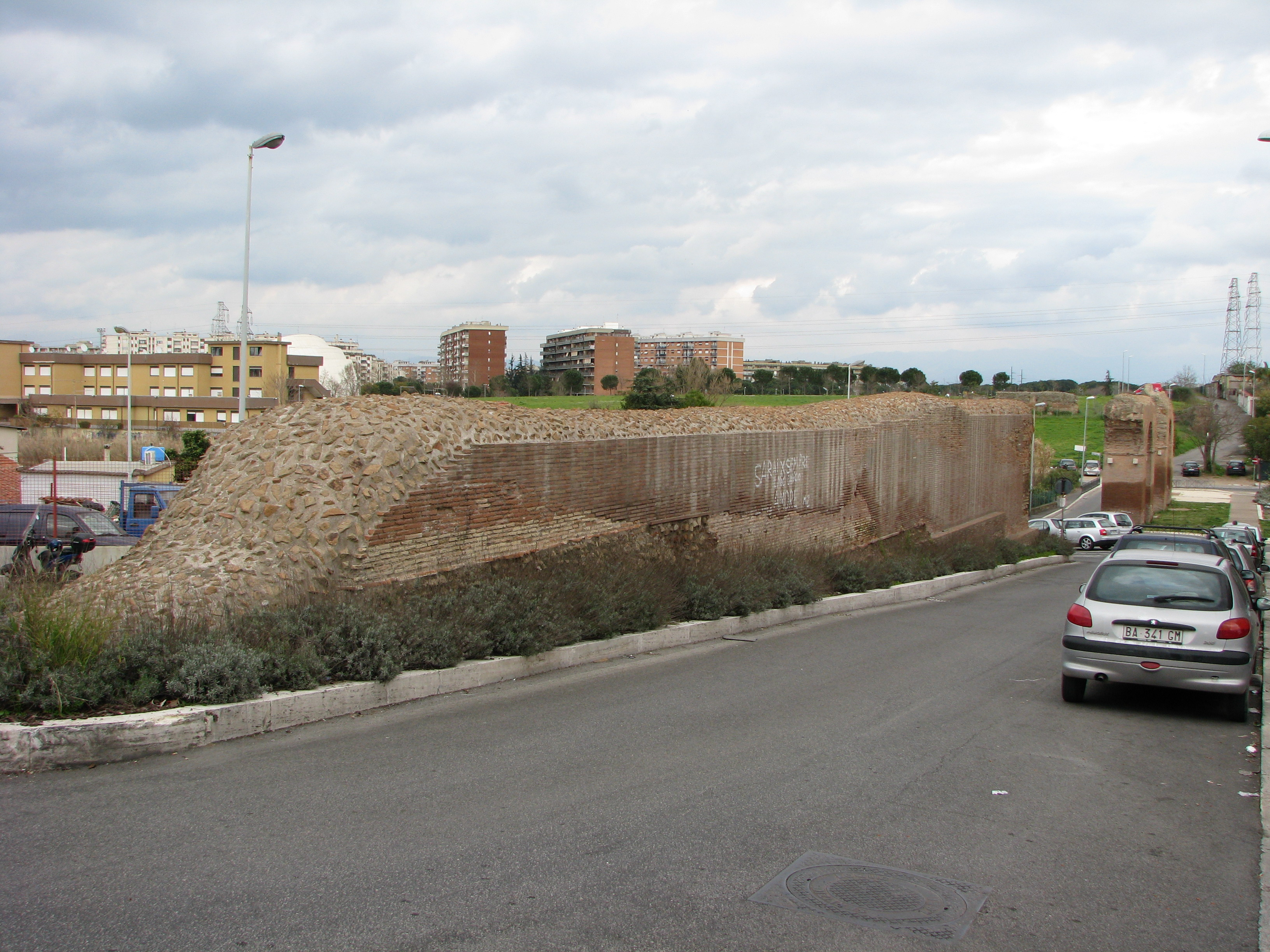
Low section without arches

== See also ==
- Aqua Claudia – Ancient Roman aqueduct in Italy
- Baths of Caracalla – Ancient Roman bath, a landmark of Rome, Italy
- List of aqueducts in the city of Rome
- List of aqueducts in the Roman Empire
- List of Roman aqueducts by date
- Parco degli Acquedotti – Park near Rome, Italy, with ancient Roman aqueducts
- Ancient Roman technology
- Roman engineering

Preceded by Arcus Novus	Landmarks of Rome; Aqua Alexandrina	Succeeded by Aqua Anio Vetus
