= Arcus Novus =

Destroyed ancient Roman arch in Rome, Italy

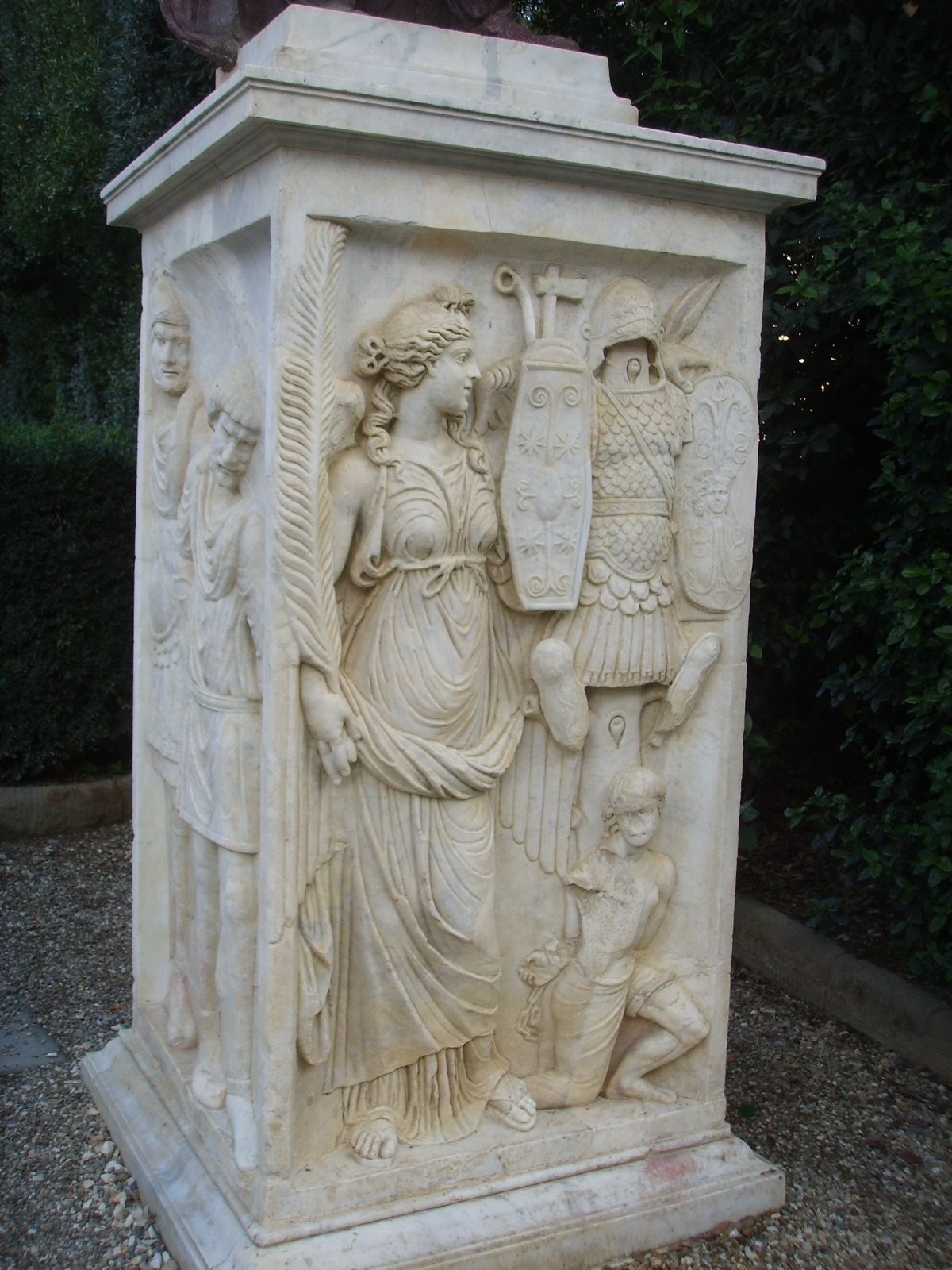
- Plinth with Victoria, Dioskuri and barbarian prisoners, now in Boboli Gardens,

- Shown within Augustan Rome
- Click on the map for a fullscreen view
- 41°53′53″N 12°28′54″E
- Type: Triumphal arch
- Location: Via lata

History
- Built: AD 293
- Built by: Diocletian

The Arcus Novus was an ancient arch in Rome, located on the Via Lata (now the Via del Corso), at the site of the church of Santa Maria in Via Lata.

== History ==
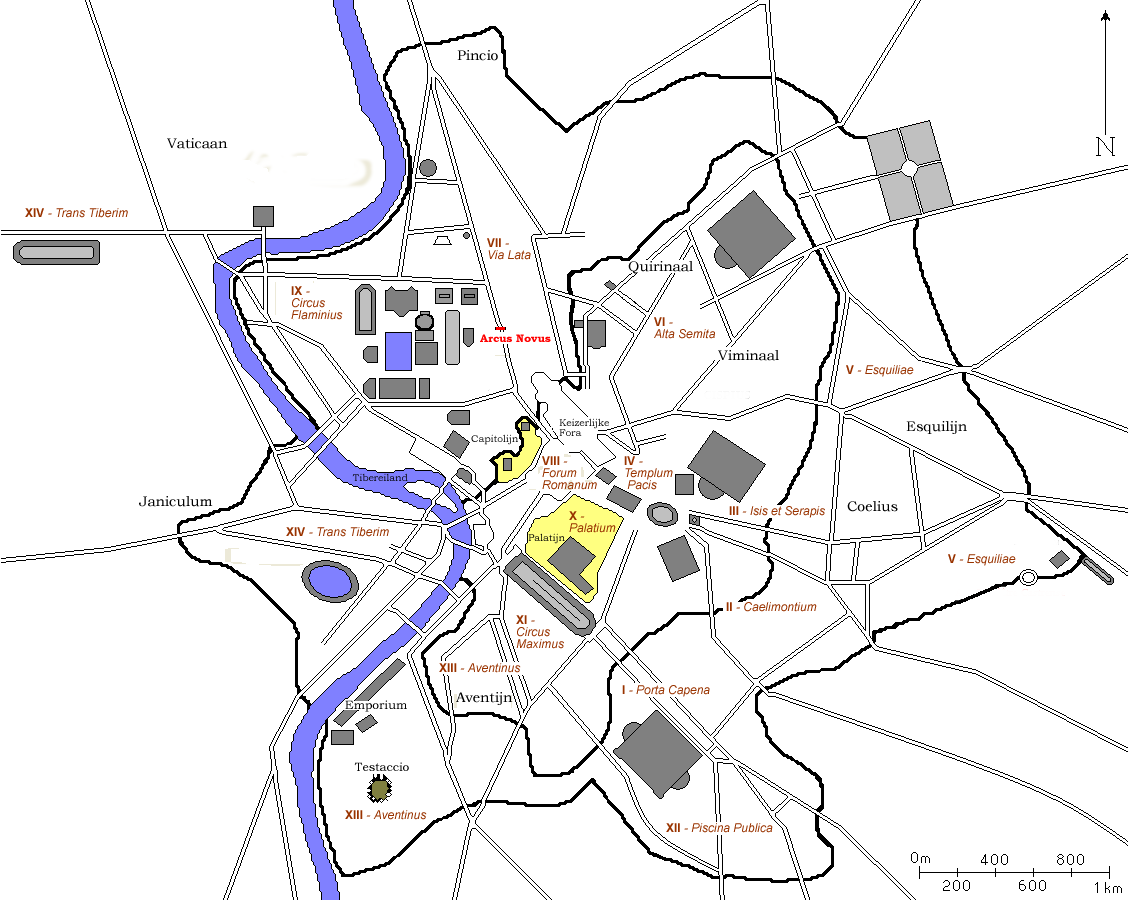
Location of Arcus Novus

The arch was dedicated to Diocletian either for the occasion of his decennalia in 293 AD, or his triumph celebrated with Maximian in 303–304. The name Arcus novus (new arch) probably refers to the earlier Arch of Claudius on the same street.

== Description ==
The Arcus Novus was decorated with reliefs reused (spolia) from a large altar of the Julio-Claudian period, most probably the Ara pietatis, while the column plinths were decorated with images of Victoria, barbarian prisoners and the Dioskouri, probably from the facade of the nearby Temple of the Sun of Aurelian. The arch was destroyed in 1491 by order of Pope Innocent VIII during reconstruction of Santa Maria in Via Lata.

Fragments of the reliefs were discovered in 1523 and added to the Della Valle collection before being acquired by Cardinal Ferdinand de' Medici in 1584, from where the plinths found their way to the Boboli Gardens in Florence. Other fragments from the Antonine period, reused by Diocletian, were included in the rear facade of the cardinal's Villa Medici in Rome. More recently excavations carried out in 1923–1933 discovered further fragments now in the Centrale Montemartini.

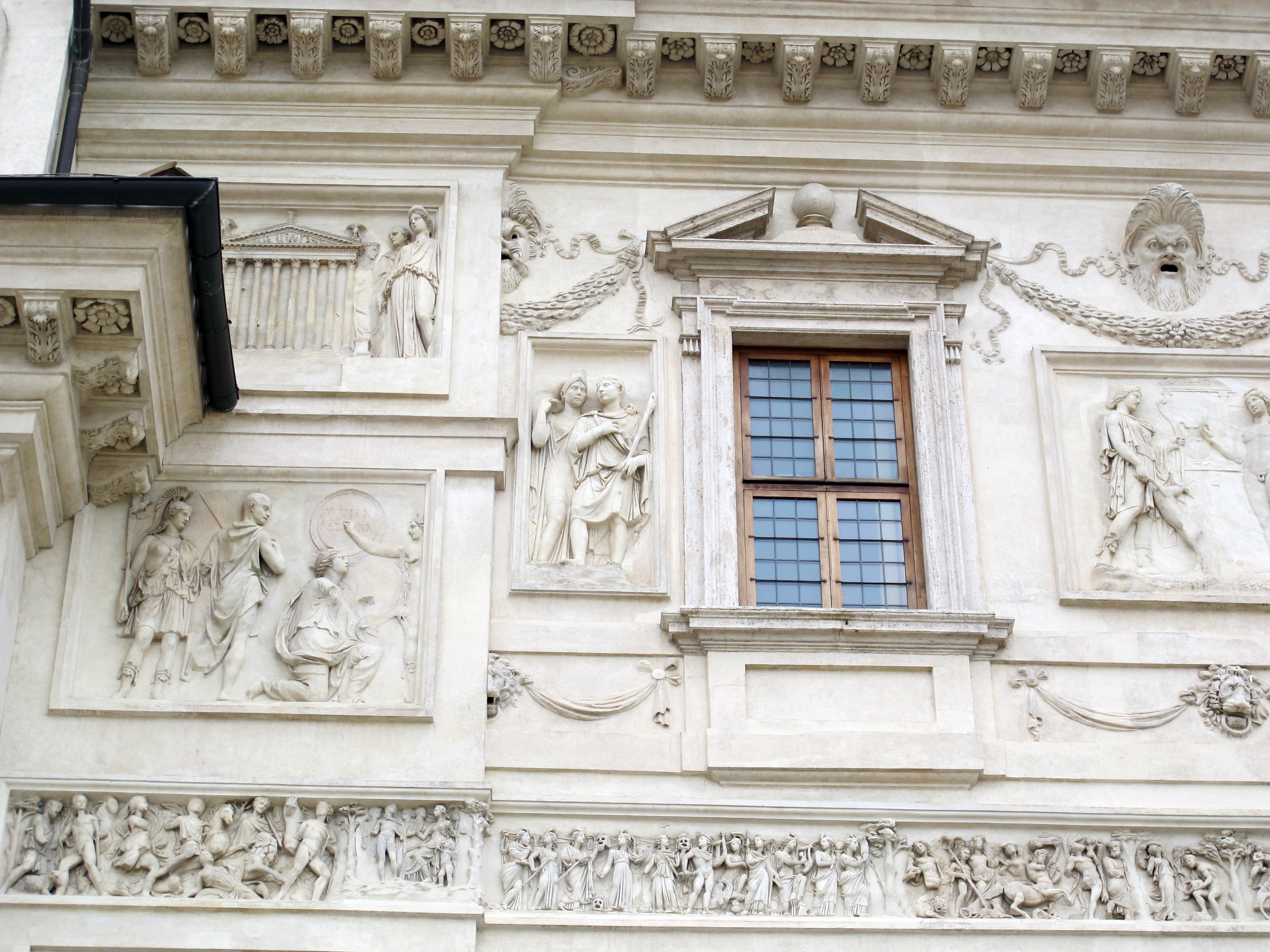
Reliefs from Arcus Novus incorporated into Villa Medici

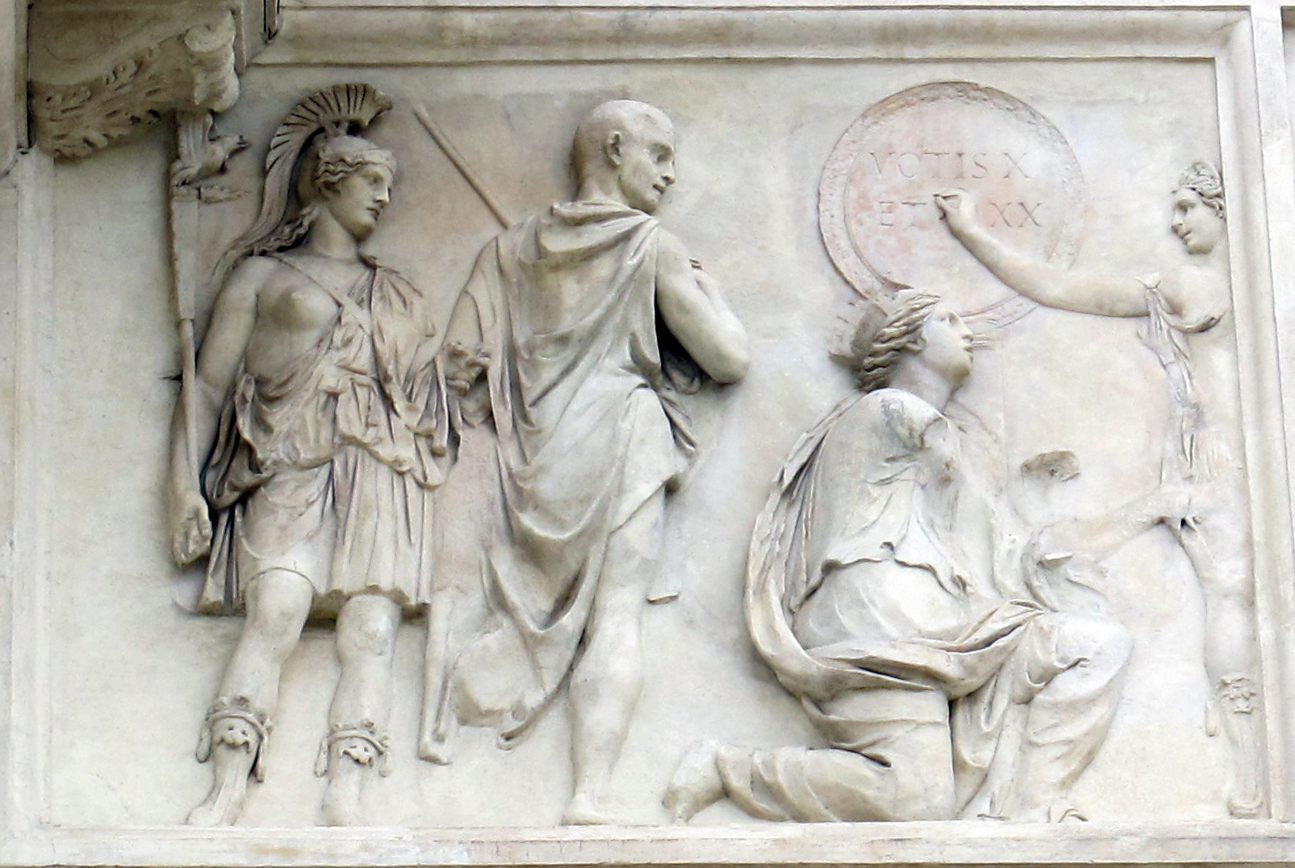
Detail

== See also ==
- List of Roman triumphal arches

== Bibliography ==
- Coarelli, Filippo; Usai, Luisanna (1989). Guida archeologica di Roma (5th ed.). Verona: Arnoldo Mondadori Editore. ISBN 9788804118961.
- Richardson, Lawrence (1992). A New Topographical Dictionary of Ancient Rome. Baltimore: Johns Hopkins University Press. ISBN 9780801843006.

Preceded by Arch of Titus	Landmarks of Rome; Arch of Novus	Succeeded by Aqua Alexandrina
