= List of university presses =

A university press is an academic publishing house affiliated with an institution of higher learning that specializes in the publication of monographs and scholarly journals. This article outlines notable presses of this type, arranged by country; where appropriate, the page also specifies the academic institution that each press is affiliated with. It also notes whether a press belongs to the Association of University Presses (AUP), the Association of European University Presses (AEUP), Association of Canadian University Presses (ACUP), or the Association Française des Presses d'Universités Diffusion (AFPU-D) [fr].

== Argentina ==
University presses in Argentina
Press	Associated institution	Status	Ref.
Editorial de la UNC [es]	National University of Córdoba	Active	
Editorial de la Universidad Nacional de Quilmes [es]	National University of Quilmes	Active	
EDUNER [es]	National University of Entre Ríos	Active	
EDULP [es]	National University of La Plata	Active	
Eudeba	University of Buenos Aires	Active	

== Armenia ==
University presses in Armenia
Press	Associated institution	Status	AEUP member	Ref.
Yerevan State University Publishing House	Yerevan State University	Active	Yes	

== Australia ==
University presses in Australia
Press	Associated institution	Status	AUP member	Ref.
ANU Press	Australian National University	Active	No	
La Trobe University Press	La Trobe University	Imprint of Black Inc.		
Melbourne University Publishing	Melbourne University	Active	Yes	
Monash University Publishing	Monash University	Active	Yes	
Sydney University Press	Sydney University	Active	No	
University of Adelaide Press	University of Adelaide	Defunct		
University of New South Wales Press	University of New South Wales	Active	Yes	
University of Queensland Press	University of Queensland	Active	No	
University of Technology Sydney ePress	University of Technology Sydney	Active	No	
UWA Publishing	University of Western Australia	Active	No	

== Austria ==
University presses in Austria
Press	Associated institution	Status	AEUP member	Ref.
Austrian Academy of Sciences Press	Austrian Academy of Sciences	Active	Yes	
Innsbruck University Press	University of Innsbruck	Active	Yes	
mdwPress	University of Music and Performing Arts Vienna	Imprint of Transcript Verlag		
Vienna University Press	University of Vienna	Imprint of Brill Publishers		

== Bangladesh ==
University presses in Bangladesh
Press	Associated institution	Status	Ref.
Daffodil International University Press	Daffodil International University	Active	
ULAB Press	University of Liberal Arts Bangladesh	Active	

== Belgium ==
University presses in Belgium
Press	Associated institution	Status	AEUP member	Ref.
Éditions de l'Académie royale de Belgique	Royal Academy of Science, Letters and Fine Arts of Belgium	Active	Yes	
Editions de l'Université libre de Bruxelles	Université libre de Bruxelles	Active	Yes	
Leuven University Press	KU Leuven	Active	Yes	
Presses de l'Université de Liège	University of Liège	Active	No	
Presses de l'Université Saint-Louis	Saint-Louis University, Brussels	Active	No	
Presses universitaires de Louvain	Université catholique de Louvain	Active	Yes	

== Brazil ==
University presses in Brazil
Press	Associated institution	Status	Ref.
Editora Argos	Universidade Comunitária da Região de Chapecó [pt]	Active	
Editora da UFCSPA	Federal University of Health Sciences of Porto Alegre	Active	
Editora da Unicamp [pt]	State University of Campinas	Active	
Editora Fiocruz	Oswaldo Cruz Foundation	Active	
Editora PUC Minas	Pontifical Catholic University of Minas Gerais	Active	
Editora UEMG	Minas Gerais State University	Active	
Editora UEPG	State University of Ponta Grossa	Active	
Editora UFG [pt]	Federal University of Goiás	Active	
Editora UFMG	Federal University of Minas Gerais	Active	
Editora Unesp	São Paulo State University	Active	
Editora Unifesp	Federal University of São Paulo	Active	
Editora Unisinos	Unisinos	Active	
Editora Universidade de Brasília [pt]	University of Brasília	Active	
Editora Universitaria Leopoldianum	Catholic University of Santos	Active	
Editus – Editora de UESC	State University of Campinas	Active	
EDUFBA	Federal University of Bahia	Active	
EdUFGD	Universidade Federal da Grande Dourados [pt]	Active	
EDUFU [pt]	Federal University of Uberlândia	Active	
Edusp [pt]	University of São Paulo	Active	
Embrapa	Ministry of Agriculture	Active	
FGV Editora [pt]	Fundação Getulio Vargas	Active	
Imprensa Oficial do Estado de São Paulo [pt]	State of São Paulo	Active	
PUCPRESS	Pontifical Catholic University of Paraná	Active	

== Bulgaria ==
University presses in Bulgaria
Press	Associated institution	Status	Ref.
Konstantin Preslavsky Publishing House	Shumen University	Active	
Publishing House of the South-West University "Neofit Rilski"	South-West University "Neofit Rilski"	Active	
St. Cyril and St. Methodius University of Veliko Tarnovo Press	Veliko Tarnovo University	Active	
St. Kliment Ohridski University Press	Sofia University	Active	

== Canada ==
University presses in Canada
Press	Associated institution	Status	ACUP member	AUP member	Ref.
Athabasca University Press	Athabasca University	Active	Yes	Yes	
Canadian Mennonite University Press	Canadian Mennonite University	Active	No	No	
Cape Breton University Press	Cape Breton University	Defunct (Note: Per Cape Breton University Press's website: "In 2014 ... the decision was made to terminate CBU Press as we know it today [but the press will work on] future publications on an ad hoc basis, under co-publication arrangements.")			
Concordia University Press	Concordia University	Active	Yes	Affiliate	
Island Studies Press	University of Prince Edward Island	Active	No	No	
McGill-Queen's University Press	McGill University and Queen's University	Active	Yes	Yes	
Memorial University Press	Memorial University of Newfoundland	Active	Yes	Affiliate	
Nunavut Arctic College Media	Nunavut Arctic College	Active	Yes	No	
Pontifical Institute of Mediaeval Studies	Pontifical Institute of Mediaeval Studies	Active	Yes	No	
Presses de l'Université de Montréal	Université de Montréal	Active	Yes	No	
Presses de l'Université du Québec	Université du Québec	Active	Yes	No	
Presses de l'Université Laval	Université Laval	Active	Yes	Former	
University of Alberta Press	University of Alberta	Active	Yes	Yes	
University of British Columbia Press	University of British Columbia	Active	Yes	Yes	
University of Calgary Press	University of Calgary	Active	Yes	Yes	
University of Manitoba Press	University of Manitoba	Active	Yes	Yes	
University of Ottawa Press	University of Ottawa	Active	Yes	Yes	
University of Regina Press	University of Regina	Active	Yes	Yes	
University of Toronto Press	University of Toronto	Active	Yes	Yes	
Wilfrid Laurier University Press	Wilfrid Laurier University	Active	Yes	Yes	

== Chile ==
University presses in Chile
Press	Associated institution	Status	Ref.
Ediciones UC	Pontifical Catholic University of Chile	Active	
Ediciones UCM	Catholic University of the Maule	Active	
Ediciones UFRO University Press	University of La Frontera	Active	
Ediciones Universidad Alberto Hurtado	Alberto Hurtado University	Active	
Ediciones Universitarias de Valparaíso	Pontifical Catholic University of Valparaíso	Active	
Editorial Universidad de la Serena	University of La Serena	Active	
Editorial Universidad de Talca	University of Talca	Active	
Editorial USACH	University of Santiago, Chile	Active	

== China ==
University presses in China
Press	Associated institution	Status	Ref.
Beijing Language and Culture University Press	Beijing Language and Culture University	Active	
China Renmin University Press	Renmin University of China	Active	
Dalian University of Technology Press	Dalian University of Technology	Active	
East China Normal University Press	East China Normal University	Active	
Fudan University Press	Fudan University	Active	
Nanjing University Press	Nanjing University	Active	
Peking University Press	Peking University	Active	
Shanghai Foreign Language Education Press	Shanghai International Studies University	Active	
Shanghai Jiao Tong University Press	Shanghai Jiao Tong University	Active	
Tianjin University Press	Tianjin University	Active	
Tsinghua University Press	Tsinghua University	Active	
Zhejiang University Press	Zhejiang University	Active	

== Colombia ==
University presses in Colombia
Press	Associated institution	Status	Ref.
Ediciones Uniandes	University of Los Andes	Active	
Editorial Los Libertadores	The Liberators University	Active	
Editorial Universidad Icesi	Universidad Icesi	Active	
University of Valle Publishing Program	University of Valle	Active	

== Czech Republic ==
University presses in the Czech Republic
Press	Associated institution	Status	AEUP member	Ref.
Karolinum Press	Charles University	Active	No	
Masaryk University Press	Masaryk University	Active	Yes	
Palacký University Press	Palacký University, Olomouc	Active	No	
VUTIUM Press	Brno University of Technology	Active	Yes	

== Denmark ==
University presses in Denmark
Press	Associated institution	Status	AEUP member	AUP member	Ref.
Aalborg University Press	Aalborg University	Active	No	No	
Aarhus University Press	Aarhus University	Active	No	Yes	
Museum Tusculanum Press	University of Copenhagen	Active	Former	No	
NIAS Press	University of Copenhagen	Active	No	No	
University Press of Southern Denmark	University of Southern Denmark	Active	No	No	

== Egypt ==
University presses in Egypt
Press	Associated institution	Status	AUP member	Ref.
American University in Cairo Press	American University in Cairo	Active	Yes	
Institut Français d'Archéologie Orientale	Institut Français d'Archéologie Orientale	Active	No	

== Estonia ==
University presses in Estonia
Press	Associated institution	Status	AEUP member	Ref.
Estonian Academy Publishers	Estonian Academy of Sciences	Active	Yes	
Tallinn University Press	Tallinn University	Active	Yes	
University of Tartu Press	University of Tartu	Active	Yes	

== Ethiopia ==
University presses in Ethiopia
Press	Associated institution	Status	Ref.
Addis Ababa University Press	Addis Ababa University	Active	
Wollega University Press	Wollega University	Active	

== Finland ==
University presses in Finland
Press	Associated institution	Status	AEUP member	Ref.
Helsinki University Press	University of Helsinki	Active	Yes	
Tampere University Press	Tampere University	Active	Yes	

== France ==
University presses in France
Press	Associated institution	Status	AEUP member	AFPU-D member	Ref.
Artois Presses Université	Artois University	Active	No	Yes	
Ausonius Éditions	Bordeaux Montaigne University	Active	No	Yes	
CIHAM-Éditions	CIHAM Center (Note: Jointly managed by Avignon University, École normale supérieure de Lyon, the French National Centre for Scientific Research, Jean Monnet University, Lumière University Lyon 2, and the School for Advanced Studies in the Social Sciences.)	Active	No	Yes	
Éditions de la Maison des sciences de l’homme	Maison des Sciences de L'Homme	Active	Yes	No	
Éditions de l'École des Hautes Études en Sciences Sociales	School for Advanced Studies in the Social Sciences	Active	Yes	No	
Éditions de l'École Normale Supérieure de Lyon	École normale supérieure de Lyon	Active	Yes	No	
Éditions du Comité des Travaux historiques et scientifiques	Comité des travaux historiques et scientifiques	Active	No	Yes	
Éditions Quae	CIRAD, IFREMER, and INRAE	Active	Yes	No	
Éditions universitaires de Dijon	University of Dijon	Active	No	Yes	
Presses de l'Inalco	Institut national des langues et civilisations orientales	Active	No	Yes	
Presses Sorbonne Nouvelle	Sorbonne Nouvelle University Paris 3	Active	No	Yes	
Presses Universitaires d'Aix-Marseille	Aix-Marseille University	Active	No	No	
Presses universitaires de Bordeaux [fr]	University of Bordeaux	Active	No	Yes	
Presses Universitaires de Franche-Comté	University of Franche-Comté	Active	Yes	No	
Presses universitaires de Perpignan	University of Perpignan Via Domitia	Active	No	Yes	
Presses Universitaires de Provence	Aix-Marseille University	Active	No	Yes	
Presses Universitaires de Rennes	Rennes 2 University	Active	No	No	
Presses universitaires de Saint-Étienne	Jean Monnet University	Active	No	Yes	
Presses universitaires de Strasbourg [fr]	University of Strasbourg	Active	No	Yes	
Presses universitaires de Vincennes [fr]	Vincennes University	Active	No	Yes	
Presses universitaires des Antilles	University of the French Antilles	Active	No	Yes	
Presses universitaires du Midi	University of Toulouse-Jean Jaurès	Active	No	Yes	
Sorbonne Université Presses	Sorbonne University	Active	No	Yes	
Université Grenoble Alpes Éditions	Grenoble Alpes University	Active	Yes	No	

== Germany ==
University presses in Germany
Press	Associated institution	Status	AEUP member	Ref.
Berlin Universities Publishing	Members of the Berlin University Alliance	Active	Yes	
Bielefeld University Press	Bielefeld University	Imprint of Transcript Verlag		
Bonn University Press	University of Bonn	Imprint of Brill Publishers		
Düsseldorf University Press	Heinrich Heine University Düsseldorf	Active	No	
Friedrich-Alexander University Press	University of Erlangen–Nuremberg	Active	Yes	
Hamburg University Press	University of Hamburg	Active	Yes	
Heidelberg University Publishing	Heidelberg University	Active	Yes	
Kassel University Press	University of Kassel	Active	Yes	
KIT Scientific Publishing	Karlsruhe Institute of Technology	Active	Yes	
Mainz University Press	University of Mainz	Imprint of Brill Publishers		
TUM.University Press	Technical University of Munich	Active	Yes	
Universitätsverlag der Technische Universität Berlin	Technische Universität Berlin	Active	Yes	
Universitätsverlag Göttingen	University of Göttingen	Active	Yes	
Universitätsverlag Osnabrück	Osnabrück University	Imprint of Brill Publishers		
Heidelberg University Publishing	Heidelberg University	Active	No	
Publishing with the RUB	Ruhr University Bochum	Active	No	

== Greece ==
University presses in Greece
Press	Associated institution	Status	AUP member	Ref.
ASCSA Publications	American School of Classical Studies at Athens	Active	Yes	
Crete University Press	Pancretan Association of America, FORTH	Active	No	
University of Macedonia Press	University of Macedonia	Active	No	

== Hong Kong ==
University presses in Hong Kong
Press	Associated institution	Status	AUP member	Ref.
Chinese University of Hong Kong Press	Chinese University of Hong Kong	Active	Yes	
City University of Hong Kong Press	City University of Hong Kong	Active	No	
Hong Kong University Press	Hong Kong University	Active	No	
Open University of Hong Kong Press	Open University of Hong Kong	Active	No	

== Hungary ==
University presses in Hungary
Press	Associated institution	Status	AEUP member	AUP member	Ref.
Central European University Press	Central European University	Active	Yes	Yes	

== India ==
University presses in India
Press	Associated institution	Status	Ref.
Banaras Hindu University Press	Banaras Hindu University	Active	
Calcutta University Press	Calcutta University	Active	
Delhi University Press	Delhi University	Active	
Guwahati University Press	Guwahati University	Active	
Jadavpur University Press	Jadavpur University	Active	
Manipal University Press	Manipal University	Active	

== Indonesia ==
University presses in Indonesia
Press	Associated institution	Status	Ref.
Airlangga University Press	Airlangga University	Active	
Gadjah Mada University Press	Gadjah Mada University	Active	
Institute of Technology of Bandung Press	Institute of Technology of Bandung	Active	
Muhammadiyah University Press	Muhammadiyah University of Surakarta	Active	
Penerbit Universitas Indonesia (UI-Press)	University of Indonesia	Active	
Universitas Darussalam Gontor Press	Pondok Modern Darussalam Gontor	Active	

== Iran ==
University presses in Iran
Press	Associated institution	Status	Ref.
University of Tehran Press	University of Tehran	Active	

== Ireland ==
University presses in Ireland
Press	Associated institution	Status	Ref.
Cork University Press	Cork University	Active	
University College Dublin Press	University College Dublin	Active	

== Israel ==
University presses in Israel
Press	Associated institution	Status	Ref.
Bar-Ilan University Press	Bar-Ilan University	Active	
Hebrew University Magnes Press	Hebrew University of Jerusalem	Active	

== Italy ==
University presses in Italy
Press	Associated institution	Status	AEUP member	Ref.
Bocconi University Press	Bocconi University	Imprint of Egea		
Bologna University Press	University of Bologna	Active	No	
Bozen-Bolzano University Press	Free University of Bozen-Bolzano	Active	Yes	
Firenze University Press	University of Florence	Active	Yes	
Genova University Press [d]	University of Genoa	Active	No	
Pisa University Press	University of Pisa	Active	No	
Publications de l'École française de Rome	École française de Rome	Active	No	
RomaTrE Press	Roma Tre University	Active	Yes	
Vita e pensiero	Università Cattolica del Sacro Cuore	Active	No	

== Jamaica ==
University presses in Jamaica
Press	Associated institution	Status	AUP member	Ref.
University of the West Indies Press	University of the West Indies	Active	Yes	

== Japan ==
University presses in Japan
Press	Associated institution	Status	AUP member	Ref.
United Nations University Press	United Nations University	Defunct		
University of Tokyo Press	University of Tokyo	Active	Yes	

== Jordan ==
University presses in Jordan
Press	Associated institution	Status	Ref.
University of Jordan Press	University of Jordan	Active	
Yarmouk University Department of Publication	Yarmouk University	Active	

== Kazakhstan ==
University presses in Kazakhstan
Press	Associated institution	Status	Ref.
Kazakh University Publishing House	Al-Farabi Kazakh National University	Active	
Kereku Publishing Center	S. Toraighyrov Pavlodar State University	Active	
Toraighyrov University Publishing Center	S. Toraighyrov Pavlodar State University	Active	

== Kenya ==
University presses in Kenya
Press	Associated institution	Status	Ref.
CUEA Press	Catholic University of Eastern Africa	Active	
Moi University Press	Moi University	Active	
University of Nairobi Press	University of Nairobi	Active	

== Latvia ==
University presses in Latvia
Press	Associated institution	Status	AEUP member	Ref.
Riga Technical University Press	Riga Technical University	Active	Yes	

== Lebanon ==
University presses in Lebanon
Press	Associated institution	Status	Ref.
American University of Beirut Press	American University of Beirut	Active	

== Lithuania ==
University presses in Lithuania
Press	Associated institution	Status	AEUP member	Ref.
Vilnius University Press	Vilnius University	Active	Yes	

== Malaysia ==
University presses in Malaysia
Press	Associated institution	Status	Ref.
IIUM Press	International Islamic University Malaysia	Active	
Penerbit UKM	National University of Malaysia	Active	
Penerbit USM	Universiti Sains Malaysia	Active	
Penerbit UTM Press	University of Technology Malaysia	Active	
Sunway University Press	Sunway University	Active	
UNIMAS Publisher	Universiti Malaysia Sarawak	Active	
Universiti Malaysia Sabah Press	Universiti Malaysia Sabah	Active	
University of Malaya Press	University of Malaya	Active	
UPM Press	University of Putra Malaysia	Active	
UPSI Press	Sultan Idris Education University	Active	
USIM Publisher	Universiti Sains Islam Malaysia	Active	
UTeM Press	Universiti Teknikal Malaysia Melaka	Active	
UTiM Press	Universiti Teknologi MARA	Active	
UUM Press	Universiti Utara Malaysia	Active	

== Mexico ==
University presses in Mexico
Press	Associated institution	Status	Ref.
Libros UNAM	National Autonomous University of Mexico	Active	
Editorial de la Universidad Veracruzana	Universidad Veracruzana	Active	
Editorial Universidad de Guadalajara	University of Guadalajara	Active	

== Namibia ==
University presses in Namibia
Press	Associated institution	Status	Ref.
University of Namibia Press	University of Namibia	Active	

== Netherlands ==
University presses in the Netherlands
Press	Associated institution	Status	AEUP member	AUP member	Ref.
Amsterdam University Press	Amsterdam University	Active	Yes	Affiliate	
Leiden University Press	Leiden University	Active	Yes	No	
Open Press TiU	Tilburg University	Active	No	No	
Radboud University Press	Radboud University	Active	Yes	No	
TU Delft OPEN Publishing	Delft University of Technology	Active	Yes	No	
University of Groningen Press	University of Groningen	Active	Yes	No	

== New Zealand ==
University presses in New Zealand
Press	Associated institution	Status	AUP member	Ref.
Auckland University Press	Auckland University	Active	No	
Canterbury University Press	University of Canterbury	Active	No	
Holloway Press	Auckland University	Active	No	
Massey University Press	Massey University	Active	No	
Otago University Press	University of Otago	Active	Yes	
Te Herenga Waka University Press	Victoria University of Wellington	Active	No	
Wai-te-ata Music Press	New Zealand School of Music	Active	No	

== Nigeria ==
University presses in Nigeria
Press	Associated institution	Status	AUP member	Ref.
Ibadan University Press	Ibadan University	Active	No	
Pan-Atlantic University Press	Pan-Atlantic University	Active	Affiliate	

== Norway ==
University presses in Norway
Press	Associated institution	Status	AEUP member	Ref.
Septentrio Academic Publishing	University of Tromsø	Active	Yes	

== Panama ==
University presses in Panama
Press	Associated institution	Status	Ref.
Editorial Tecnológica	Technological University of Panama	Active	

== Peru ==
University presses in Peru
Press	Associated institution	Status	Ref.
Fondo Editorial de la Pontificia Universidad Católica del Perú [es]	Pontifical Catholic University of Peru	Active	
Fondo Editorial de la Universidad Católica Sedes Sapientiae [es]	Universidad Católica Sedes Sapientiae [es]	Active	
Fondo Editorial de la Universidad Inca Garcilaso de la Vega	Inca Garcilaso de la Vega University	Active	
National University of San Marcos Press	National University of San Marcos	Active	

== Philippines ==
University presses in the Philippines
Press	Associated institution	Status	Ref.
Ateneo de Manila University Press	Ateneo de Manila University	Active	
Ateneo de Naga University Press	Ateneo de Naga University	Active	
Sentro ng Wikang Filipino	University of the Philippines System	Active	
University of the Philippines Press	University of the Philippines	Active	
University of Santo Tomas Publishing House	University of Santo Tomas	Active	
XU Press	Xavier University – Ateneo de Cagayan	Active	

== Poland ==
University presses in Poland
Press	Associated institution	Status	Ref.
The Nicolaus Copernicus University Press	Nicolaus Copernicus University in Toruń	Active	
SWPS University Press	SWPS University	Active	
Wydawnictwa Uniwersyteckie Trans Humana [pl]	University of Białystok	Active	
Wydawnictwa Uniwersytetu Warszawskiego [pl]	University of Warsaw	Active	
Wydawnictwo KUL	John Paul II Catholic University of Lublin	Active	
Wydawnictwo Naukowe UAM [pl]	Adam Mickiewicz University in Poznań	Active	
Wydawnictwo Naukowe Uniwersytetu Pedagogicznego w Krakowie	Pedagogical University of Cracow	Active	
Wydawnictwo Naukowe Uniwersytetu Szczecińskiego	University of Szczecin	Active	
Wydawnictwo Uniwersytetu Ekonomicznego w Katowicach	University of Economics in Katowice	Active	
Wydawnictwo Uniwersytetu Ekonomicznego w Krakowie [pl]	Cracow University of Economics	Active	
Wydawnictwo Uniwersytetu Ekonomicznego we Wrocławiu	Wrocław University of Economics	Active	
Wydawnictwo Uniwersytetu Gdańskiego [pl]	University of Gdańsk	Active	
Wydawnictwo Uniwersytetu Jagiellońskiego	Jagiellonian University	Active	
Wydawnictwo Uniwersytetu Kardynała Stefana Wyszyńskiego w Warszawie	Cardinal Stefan Wyszyński University in Warsaw	Active	
Wydawnictwo Uniwersytetu Kazimierza Wielkiego [pl]	Kazimierz Wielki University in Bydgoszcz	Active	
Wydawnictwo Uniwersytetu Łódzkiego [pl]	University of Łódź	Active	
Wydawnictwo Uniwersytetu Marii Curie-Skłodowskiej	Maria Curie-Skłodowska University	Active	
Wydawnictwo Uniwersytetu Opolskiego	Opole University	Active	
Wydawnictwo Uniwersytetu Przyrodniczego w Lublinie	University of Life Sciences in Lublin	Active	
Wydawnictwo Uniwersytetu Przyrodniczego w Poznaniu	University of Life Sciences in Poznań	Active	
Wydawnictwo Uniwersytetu Przyrodniczego we Wrocławiu	University of Life Sciences in Wrocław	Active	
Wydawnictwo Uniwersytetu Śląskiego	University of Silesia	Active	
Wydawnictwo Uniwersytetu Technologiczno-Przyrodniczego im. Jana i Jędrzeja Śniadeckich w Bydgoszczy	University of Technology and Life Sciences in Bydgoszcz	Active	
Wydawnictwo Uniwersytetu w Białymstoku [pl]	University of Białystok	Active	
Wydawnictwo Uniwersytetu Warmińsko-Mazurskiego w Olsztynie [pl]	University of Warmia and Mazury in Olsztyn	Active	
Wydawnictwo Uniwersytetu Wrocławskiego [pl]	University of Wrocław	Active	

== Portugal ==
University presses in Portugal
Press	Associated institution	Status	Ref.
FEUP Edições	University of Porto	Active	
Imprensa da UC	University of Coimbra	Active	
IST Press	Instituto Superior Técnico (University of Lisbon)	Active	
U.Porto Edições	University of Porto	Active	
UA Editora	University of Aveiro	Active	
Universidade Católica Editora	Catholic University of Portugal	Active	

== Qatar ==
University presses in Qatar
Press	Associated institution	Status	AUP member	Ref.
Hamad Bin Khalifa University Press	Hamad Bin Khalifa University	Active	No	
Qatar University Press	Qatar University	Active	Former	

== Romania ==
University presses in Romania
Press	Associated institution	Status	AEUP member	Ref.
Bucharest University Press	University of Bucharest	Active	No	
Cluj University Press	Babeș-Bolyai University	Active	No	
Silvica Publishing House	Institutului Național de Cercetare – Dezvoltare în Silvicultură "Marin Drăcea"	Active	Yes	
University Press	University of Târgu Mureș	Active	Yes	

== Russia ==
University presses in Russia
Press	Associated institution	Status	Ref.
Moscow State University Press	Moscow State University	Active	
Omsk State University Press	Omsk State University	Active	
Pacific National University Press	Pacific National University	Active	
Perm State University Press	Perm State University	Active	
Saint Petersburg State University Press	Saint Petersburg State University	Active	

== Saudi Arabia ==
University presses in Saudi Arabia
Press	Associated institution	Status	Ref.
Imam Abdulrahman Bin Faisal University Scientific Publishing Center	Imam Abdulrahman Bin Faisal University	Active	
King Saud University Press	King Saud University	Active	

== Senegal ==
University presses in Senegal
Press	Associated institution	Status	Ref.
Presses Universitaires de Dakar	Cheikh Anta Diop University	Active	

== Singapore ==
University presses in Singapore
Press	Associated institution	Status	Ref.
NUS Press	National University of Singapore	Active	

== South Africa ==
University presses in South Africa
Press	Associated institution	Status	AUP member	Ref.
Pretoria University Law Press	University of Pretoria	Active	No	
UCT Press	University of Cape Town	Active	No	
UJ Press	University of Johannesburg	Active	Introductory	
Unisa Press	University of South Africa	Active	No	
University of Fort Hare Press	University of Fort Hare	Defunct		
University of KwaZulu-Natal Press	University of KwaZulu-Natal	Active	No	
Wits University Press	University of the Witwatersrand	Active	No	

== South Korea ==
University presses in South Korea
Press	Associated institution	Status	Ref.
Ewha Womans University Press	Ewha Womans University	Active	
Jeonbuk National University Press	Jeonbuk National University	Active	
Pusan National University Press	Pusan National University	Active	
Seoul National University Publishing Center	Seoul National University	Active	
Yonsei University Press	Yonsei University	Active	

== Spain ==
University presses in Spain
Press	Associated institution	Status	Ref.
Éditions de la Casa de Velázquez	Casa de Velázquez	Active	
Editorial Universidad de Cantabria	University of Cantabria	Active	
Editorial de la Universidad de Sevilla	University of Seville	Active	
Servicio de Publicaciones Universidad Pontificia Comillas	Comillas Pontifical University	Active	
UAM Editions	Autonomous University of Madrid	Active	
UPV/EHU Press	University of the Basque Country	Active	

== Sweden ==
University presses in Sweden
Press	Associated institution	Status	AEUP member	Ref.
Karlstad University Press	Karlstad University	Active	No	
Linköping University Electronic Press	Linköping University	Active	No	
Linnaeus University Press	Linnaeus University	Active	No	
Lund University Press	Lund University	Active	No	
Stockholm University Press	Stockholm University	Active	Yes	

== Taiwan ==
University presses in Taiwan
Press	Associated institution	Status	AUP member	Ref.
Chengchi University Press	National Chengchi University	Active	No	
National Taiwan University Press	National Taiwan University	Active	Yes	
National Tsing Hua University Press	National Tsing Hua University	Active	No	

== Thailand ==
University presses in Thailand
Press	Associated institution	Status	Ref.
Chiang Mai University Press	Chiang Mai University	Active	

== Tunisia ==
University presses in Tunis
Press	Associated institution	Status	Ref.
ISD Manouba	Manouba University	Active	

== Turkey ==
University presses in Turkey
Press	Associated institution	Status	Ref.
Bogazici University Press	Bogazici University	Active	
İstanbul Bilgi University Press	Istanbul Bilgi University	Active	
Istanbul University Press	Istanbul University	Active	

== Uganda ==
University presses in Uganda
Press	Associated institution	Status	Ref.
Makerere University Press	Makerere University	Active	

== Ukraine ==
University presses in Ukraine
Press	Associated institution	Status	Ref.
Duh i Litera	National University of Kyiv-Mohyla Academy	Active	
Kyiv Mohyla University Press	National University of Kyiv-Mohyla Academy	Active	
Lviv Polytechnic National University Publishing House	Lviv University	Active	

== United Arab Emirates ==
University presses in the United Arab Emirates
Press	Associated institution	Status	AUP member	Ref.
American University of Sharjah Press	American University of Sharjah	Active	Introductory	
Hamdan Bin Mohammed Smart University Publishing	Hamdan Bin Mohammed Smart University	Active	No	
Zayed University Press	Zayed University	Active	No	

== United Kingdom ==
University presses in the United Kingdom
Press	Associated institution	Status	AEUP member	AUP member	Ref.
Aberdeen University Press	Aberdeen University	Active	No	No	
Bristol University Press	University of Bristol	Active	No	Yes	
Cambridge University Press	University of Cambridge	Active	No	Yes	
Edinburgh University Press	University of Edinburgh	Active	No	Yes	
Goldsmiths Press	Goldsmiths, University of London	Active	No	No	
Hull University Press	University of Hull	Defunct			
Imperial College Press	Imperial College London	Defunct			
Kingston University Press	Kingston University	Active	No	No	
Liverpool University Press	Liverpool University	Active	Former	Yes	
LSE Press	London School of Economics and Political Science	Active	No	Yes	
Manchester University Press	Manchester University	Active	No	Yes	
Northumbria University Press	Northumbria University	Defunct			
Nottingham University Press	University of Nottingham	Imprint of 5m Books			
Open Press at University of Sussex	University of Sussex	Active	No	Introductory	
Open University Press	Open University	Imprint of McGraw Hill			
Oxford University Press	University of Oxford	Active	No	Yes	
Scottish Universities Press	Various (Note: The press is collectively supported by the libraries of Abertay University, the University of Dundee, the University of Edinburgh, Edinburgh Napier University, the University of Glasgow, Glasgow Caledonian University, the Glasgow School of Art, Heriot Watt University, The Open University, Queen Margaret University, Robert Gordon University. the Royal Conservatoire of Scotland, Scotland's Rural College, University of St Andrews, the University of Stirling, the University of Strathclyde, the University of the Highlands and Islands, and the University of the West of Scotland.)	Active	No	No	
UCL Press	University College London	Active	Yes	Yes	
University of Chester Press	University of Chester	Active	No	No	
University of Exeter Press	University of Exeter	Active	No	No	
University of Hertfordshire Press	University of Hertfordshire	Active	No	No	
University of Huddersfield Press	University of Huddersfield	Active	No	No	
University of London Press	University of London	Active	No	No	
University of Wales Press	University of Wales	Active	No	No	
University of Westminster Press	University of Westminster	Active	Yes	No	
University of York Music Press	University of York	Active	No	No	
White Rose University Press	White Rose University Consortium (Note: Which comprises the University of Leeds, the University of Sheffield, and the University of York.)	Active	No	No	
XJTLU	Xi’an Jiaotong-Liverpool University	Imprint of Liverpool University Press			

== United States ==
University presses in the United States
Press	Associated institution	Status	AUP member	Ref.
Abilene Christian University Press	Abilene Christian University	Active	Yes	
ACMRS Press	Arizona Center for Medieval and Renaissance Studies	Active	Yes	
Air University Press	Air University	Active	Yes	
Alaska Pacific University Press	Alaska Pacific University	Defunct		
Amherst College Press	Amherst College	Active	Affiliate	
Andrews University Press	Andrews University	Active	No	
Army University Press	Army University	Active	Introductory	
Associated University Presses	Various (Note: Associated University Presses was a consortium of five smaller university press imprints: Bucknell University Press, University of Delaware Press, Fairleigh Dickinson University Press, Lehigh University Press, and Susquehanna University Press.)	Defunct		
Atlanta University Press	Atlanta University	Defunct		
Baylor University Press	Baylor University	Active	Yes	
Bilingual Press	Arizona State University Hispanic Research Center	Active	No	
BJU Press	Bob Jones University	Active	No	
Boston College Press	Boston College	Defunct		
Brandeis University Press	Brandeis University	Active	Yes	
Bridwell Press	Southern Methodist University	Active	No	
Brigham Young University Press	Brigham Young University	Defunct		
Brookings Institution Press	Brookings Institution	Active	Yes	
Brown University Digital Publications	Brown University	Active	Affiliate	
Bucknell University Press	Bucknell University	Defunct		
Carnegie Mellon University Press	Carnegie Mellon University	Active	Yes	
Case Western Reserve University Press	Case Western Reserve University	Defunct		
Catholic University of America Press	Catholic University of America	Active	Yes	
Central Michigan Press	Central Michigan University	Active	No	
Clark University Press	Clark University	Defunct		
Clemson University Press	Clemson University	Active	Yes	
Columbia University Press	Columbia University	Active	Yes	
Columbus State University Press	Columbus State University	Active	No	
Combat Studies Institute Press	Combat Studies Institute	Imprint of Army UP		
Cornell University Press	Cornell University	Active	Yes	
Creighton University Press	Creighton University	Defunct		
Dartmouth College Press	Dartmouth College	Defunct		
Digital Press at the University of North Dakota	University of North Dakota	Active	No	
Duke University Press	Duke University	Active	Yes	
Duquesne University Press	Duquesne University	Active	No	
Eastern Washington University Press	Eastern Washington University	Defunct		
Evergreen State College Press	Evergreen State College	Active	No	
Fairleigh Dickinson University Press	Fairleigh Dickinson University	Active (Note: Both Fairleigh Dickinson University Press and Lehigh University Press are in co-publishing agreements with Rowman & Littlefield (now owned by Bloomsbury Publishing).)	No	
Fisk University Press	Fisk University	Defunct		
Fordham University Press	Fordham University	Active	Yes	
Gallaudet University Press	Gallaudet University	Active	Yes	
George Mason University Press	George Mason University	Active	Affiliate	
George Washington University Press	George Washington University	Active	Introductory	
Georgetown University Press	Georgetown University	Active	Yes	
Harvard Education Press	Harvard Graduate School of Education	Active	Yes	
Harvard University Press	Harvard University	Active	Yes	
Hebrew Union College Press	Hebrew Union College	Active	No	
Heritage Christian University Press	Heritage Christian University	Active	No	
Hill College Press	Hill College	Active	No	
Howard University Press	Howard University	Defunct		
Indiana University Press	Indiana University	Active	Yes	
Island Press	Imprint of Princeton UP			
Iowa State University Digital Press	Iowa State University	Active	No	
Iowa State University Press	Iowa State University	Defunct		
John Brown University Press	John Brown University	Defunct		
Johns Hopkins University Press	Johns Hopkins University	Active	Yes	
Kent State University Press	Kent State University	Active	Yes	
Lamar University Literary Press	Lamar University	Active	No	
Lehigh University Press	Lehigh University	Active	No	
Lever Press	Various (Note: A comprehensive list of all participating institutions can be found on the Lever Press website.)	Active	Introductory	
Louisiana State University Press	Louisiana State University	Active	Yes	
Loyola New Orleans Press	Loyola University New Orleans	Defunct		
Loyola University Press	Loyola University Chicago	Reorganized as Loyola Press		
Lynn University Digital Press	Lynn University	Active	No	
Marine Corps University Press	Marine Corps University	Active	Yes	
Marquette University Press	Marquette University	Active	Yes	
Medieval Institute Publications	Western Michigan University	Active	Yes	
Mercer University Press	Mercer University	Active	Yes	
Miami University Press	Miami University	Active	No	
Michigan State University Press	Michigan State University	Active	Yes	
MIT Press	MIT	Active	Yes	
Naval Institute Press	United States Naval Institute	Active	Yes	
Naval War College Press	Naval War College	Active	No	
New York University Press	New York University	Active	Yes	
North Dakota State University Press	North Dakota State University	Active	No	
Northeastern University Press	Northeastern University	Defunct		
Northern Illinois University Press	Northern Illinois University	Imprint of Cornell UP		
Northwestern University Press	Northwestern University	Active	Yes	
Oberlin College Press	Oberlin College	Defunct		
Oglethorpe University Press	Oglethorpe University	Defunct		
Ohio State University Press	Ohio State University	Active	Yes	
Ohio University Press	Ohio University	Active	Yes	
Oklahoma Baptist University Press	Oklahoma Baptist University	Defunct		
Oregon State University Press	Oregon State University	Active	Yes	
Pace University Press	Pace University	Active	No	
Pacific University Press	Pacific University	Active	No	
Penn State University Press	Pennsylvania State University	Active	Yes	
The Press at Cal Poly Humboldt	Cal Poly Humboldt	Active	No	
Princeton University Press	Princeton University	Active	Yes	
Proa Publications	Northern Marianas College	Imprint of Guam UP		
Purdue University Press	Purdue University	Active	Yes	
Redhawk Publications	Catawba Valley Community College	Active	No	
Rice University Press	Rice University	Defunct		
RIT Press	Rochester Institute of Technology	Active	Yes	
Rockefeller University Press	Rockefeller University	Active	Affiliate	
Rockhurst University Press	Rockhurst University	Active	No	
Rutgers University Press	Rutgers University	Active	Yes	
Saint Joseph's University Press	Saint Joseph's University	Active	Introductory	
Saint Louis University Press	Saint Louis University	Defunct		
San Diego State University Press	San Diego State University	Active	No	
SBL Press	Society of Biblical Literature	Active	Yes	
Sierra College Press	Sierra College	Active	No	
Southern Illinois University Press	Southern Illinois University	Active	Yes	
Southeast Missouri State University Press	Southeast Missouri State University	Active	No	
Southern Methodist University Press	Southern Methodist University	Defunct		
Stanford University Press	Stanford University	Active	Yes	
Stephen F. Austin State University Press	Stephen F. Austin State University	Active	No	
SUNY Press	State University of New York system	Active	Yes	
Susquehanna University Press	Susquehanna University	Active	No	
Syracuse University Press	Syracuse University	Active	Yes	
Teachers College Press	Teachers College, Columbia University	Active	Yes	
Temple University Press	Temple University	Active	Yes	
Texas A&M University Press	Texas A&M University	Active	Yes	
Texas Christian University Press	Texas Christian University	Active	Yes	
Texas Review Press	Sam Houston State University	Active	Yes	
Texas Tech University Press	Texas Tech University	Active	Yes	
Texas Western Press	University of Texas at El Paso	Active	No	
Tribal College Press	US tribal colleges and universities	Active	No	
Trinity University Press	Trinity University	Closing 2026		
Truman State University Press	Truman State University	Defunct		
Tufts University Press	Tufts University	Defunct		
UL Press	University of Louisiana	Active	Introductory	
University of Akron Press	University of Akron	Active	Yes	
University of Alabama Press	University of Alabama	Active	Yes	
University of Alaska Press	University of Alaska	Imprint of UP Colorado		
University of Arizona Press	University of Arizona	Active	Yes	
University of Arkansas Press	University of Arkansas	Active	Yes	
University of California Press	University of California	Active	Yes	
University of Chicago Press	University of Chicago	Active	Yes	
University of Cincinnati Press	University of Cincinnati	Defunct		
University of Delaware Press	University of Delaware	Active	Introductory	
University of Georgia Press	University of Georgia	Active	Yes	
University of Guam Press	University of Guam	Active	Affiliate	
University of Hawaiʻi Press	University of Hawaiʻi	Active	Yes	
University of Idaho Press	University of Idaho	Imprint of Caxton Press		
University of Illinois Press	University of Illinois	Active	Yes	
University of Iowa Press	University of Iowa	Active	Yes	
University of Maine Press	University of Maine	Active	No	
University of Massachusetts Press	University of Massachusetts	Active	Yes	
University of Michigan Press	University of Michigan	Active	Yes	
University of Minnesota Press	University of Minnesota	Active	Yes	
University of Missouri Press	University of Missouri	Active	Yes	
University of Nebraska Press	University of Nebraska–Lincoln	Active	Yes	
University of Nevada Press	University of Nevada	Active	Yes	
University of New Hampshire Press	University of New Hampshire	Defunct		
University of New Mexico Press	University of New Mexico	Active	Yes	
University of New Orleans Press	University of New Orleans	Active	No	
University of North Carolina Press	University of North Carolina	Active	Yes	
University of North Georgia Press	University of North Georgia	Active	Affiliate	
University of North Texas Press	University of North Texas	Active	Yes	
University of Notre Dame Press	University of Notre Dame	Active	Yes	
University of Oklahoma Press	University of Oklahoma	Active	Yes	
University of Pennsylvania Press	University of Pennsylvania	Active	Yes	
University of Pittsburgh Press	University of Pittsburgh	Active	Yes	
University of San Francisco Press	University of San Francisco	Defunct		
University of Scranton Press	University of Scranton	Defunct		
University of South Carolina Press	University of South Carolina	Active	Yes	
University of Southern California Press	University of Southern California	Defunct		
University of Tampa Press	University of Tampa	Active	No	
University of Tennessee Press	University of Tennessee	Active	Yes	
University of Texas at El Paso Press	University of Texas at El Paso	Active	No	
University of Texas Press	University of Texas	Active	Yes	
University of Utah Press	University of Utah	Active	Yes	
University of Vermont Press	University of Vermont	Active	Introductory	
University of Virginia Press	University of Virginia	Active	Yes	
University of Washington Press	University of Washington	Active	Yes	
University of Wisconsin Press	University of Wisconsin	Active	Yes	
University of Wyoming Press	University of Wyoming	Imprint of UP Colorado		
University Press of Colorado	Various (Note: The press is supported by a group of Colorado public/private universities (namely, Adams State University, Colorado State University, Fort Lewis College, Metropolitan State University of Denver, the University of Colorado, the University of Northern Colorado, Regis University, and Western State Colorado University), as well as by the University of Alaska, Utah State University, and the University of Wyoming systems.)	Active	Yes	
University Press of Florida	State University System of Florida	Active	Yes	
University Press of Kansas	Consortium of Kansas state universities (Note: This includes Emporia State University, Fort Hays State University, Kansas State University, Pittsburg State University, the University of Kansas, and Wichita State University.)	Active	Yes	
University Press of Kentucky	Consortium of Kentucky universities (Note: This includes the following public and private institutions: Bellarmine University, Berea College, Centre College, Eastern Kentucky University, Georgetown College, Kentucky State University, Morehead State University, Murray State University, Northern Kentucky University, Spalding University, Transylvania University, University of Kentucky, University of Louisville, University of Pikeville, and Western Kentucky University. The consortium also includes the Filson Historical Society and the Kentucky Historical Society.)	Active	Yes	
University Press of Mississippi	Mississippi Institutions of Higher Learning (Note: This includes Alcorn State University, Delta State University, Jackson State University, Mississippi State University, Mississippi University for Women, Mississippi Valley State University, University of Mississippi, and the University of Southern Mississippi.)	Active	Yes	
University Press of New England	Various (Note: Associated University Presses was a consortium of smaller university press imprints that included Brandeis University Press, Dartmouth College Press, Northeastern University Press, Tufts University Press, University of New Hampshire Press, and the University of Vermont Press.)	Defunct		
University Press of Sewanee	Sewanee: The University of the South	Defunct		
USC Annenberg Press	USC Annenberg School for Communication and Journalism	Active	No	
Utah State University Press	Utah State University	Imprint of UP Colorado		
Vanderbilt University Press	Vanderbilt University	Active	Yes	
Virginia Tech Publishing	Virginia Tech	Active	Affiliate	
Wake Forest University Press	Wake Forest University	Active	Affiliate	
Washington State University Press	Washington State University	Active	Yes	
Washington University Press	Washington University in St. Louis	Defunct		
Wayne State University Press	Wayne State University	Active	Yes	
Wesleyan University Press	Wesleyan University	Active	Yes	
West Point Press	United States Military Academy	Active	Introductory	
West Virginia University Press	West Virginia University	Active	Yes	
Wharton School Press	Wharton School of the University of Pennsylvania	Active	No	
Xavier University Press	Xavier University of Louisiana	Defunct		
Yale University Press	Yale University	Active	Yes	

== Uzbekistan ==
University presses in Uzbekistan
Press	Associated institution	Status	Ref.
Tashkent State University of Law Publishing	Tashkent State University of Law	Active	

== Vietnam ==
University presses in Vietnam
Press	Associated institution	Status	Ref.
Vietnam National University Press	Vietnam National University, Hanoi	Active	

== Yemen ==
University presses in Yemen
Press	Associated institution	Status	Ref.
Aden University House for Printing and Publishing	University of Aden	Active	

== Zambia ==
University presses in Zambia
Press	Associated institution	Status	Ref.
UNZA Press	University of Zambia	Active	

== See also ==
- Association of Learned and Professional Society Publishers (ALPSP) – an international association of 330 non-profit publishers
- Association of Jesuit University Presses (AJUP) – a defunct press association affiliated with the Association of Jesuit Colleges and Universities
- International Convention of University Presses – an annual meeting of representatives from about 100 university presses
