= Lehigh University Press =

Publishing house

- Parent company: Lehigh University
- Founded: 1985
- Country of origin: United States
- Headquarters location: Bethlehem, Pennsylvania
- Distribution: Rowman & Littlefield
- Publication types: Books, Journals
- Official website: Lehigh University Press

Lehigh University Press is the publishing house of Lehigh University. It is primarily known for publishing scholarly works related to eighteenth-century studies, local history, and science and technology in society.

== History ==
Founded in 1985, Lehigh's university press was a member of the Associated University Presses consortium; other members included Bucknell University Press, University of Delaware Press, Susquehanna University Press and Fairleigh Dickinson University Press. When Associated University Presses ceased most new publishing in 2010, a new distribution agreement between Lehigh University Press, Bucknell University Press, University of Delaware Press, and Fairleigh Dickinson University Press was struck with Rowman & Littlefield.

The current director of the press is Lehigh English professor Kate Crassons. The press's three main areas of focus are eighteenth-century studies, local history, and science and technology in society.

== See also ==
- List of English-language book publishing companies
- List of university presses
