= University of Guam Press =

Academic publisher

- Parent company: University of Guam
- Country of origin: United States
- Headquarters location: Mangilao, Guam
- Publication types: Books
- Official website: uogpress.com

University of Guam Press is a university press affiliated with the University of Guam, located in Mangilao, Guam. Most of the publisher's releases focus on the "peoples and cultures of the Micronesian Islands". The press also manages Proa Publications, the official publishing outlet of Northern Marianas College. The University of Guam Press is currently an affiliate of the Association of University Presses.

== Description ==
The University of Guam Press is an integral part of the Richard Flores Taitano Micronesian Area Research Center (MARC), which holds the most extensive repository of information about Guam and Micronesia. The university extends the MARC’s mission of collecting, preserving, and providing access to reliable and accurate information about the peoples and cultures of the Western Pacific, thereby advancing scholarship and learning in and about the region.

The University of Guam Press has two major publishing imprints: MARC Publications and Taiguini Books.

== Notable books ==
Julian Aguon - The Properties of Perpetual Light

== See also ==
- List of English-language book publishing companies
- List of university presses
