= RIT Press =

University press

- The logo of RIT Press
- Parent company: Rochester Institute of Technology
- Founded: 2001 (as RIT Cary Graphic Arts Press); 2007 (as RIT Press)
- Country of origin: United States
- Headquarters location: Rochester, New York
- Publication types: Books
- Official website: rit.edu/press/

The Rochester Institute of Technology Press (often referred to as the RIT Press) is a university press affiliated with Rochester Institute of Technology, in Rochester, New York. The press—which is currently a member of the Association of University Presses—publishes between 8-12 titles annually and is operated by the RIT Libraries.

The press has its origin in the RIT Cary Graphic Arts Press, which was an "experimental academic press" founded in 2001 by David Pankow (former curator of the Cary Graphic Arts Collection). In 2007, the press introduced the "RIT Press" imprint, which eventually subsumed the university's other imprints in 2013.

== Publications ==
=== Book series ===
Notable book series published by the press include the following:

- "Press Arts & Crafts Movement"
- "Graphic Design Archives Chapbook"
- "Comics Studies Monograph Series"
- "Printing History"
- "Print Industry Center Monograph Series"

== See also ==
- List of English-language book publishing companies
- List of university presses
