= University of Cincinnati Press =

University press

- Parent company: University of Cincinnati
- Founded: 1901 (Historical); 2017 (Modern)
- Defunct: 30 June 2025
- Distribution: Chicago Distribution Center
- Publication types: Books, journals
- Official website: ucincinnatipress.uc.edu

University of Cincinnati Press was a university press operated by the University of Cincinnati. Originally founded in 1901, the press was re-launched in 2017 under the aegis of the University of Cincinnati Libraries. The newer iteration of the press was a member of both the Library Publishing Coalition and the Association of University Presses (having been accepted into both in 2017), and it was also an ambassador for the Ohio Library and Information Network's (OhioLINK) Affordable Learning initiative. In late 2024, it was announced that the press would be closed.

== History ==
In 1901, Charles Phelps Taft gifted the University of Cincinnati $5,500 to purchase a printing press, whereupon the university began to issue publications marked with the "University of Cincinnati Press" imprint. Works released by the press at this time included monographs, textbooks, and the University of Cincinnati Record (a bi-monthly periodical focused on university news) and University Studies (a bi-monthly publication showcasing the work of University of Cincinnati faculty). This iteration of the press ceased to publish in 1908, and the printing press itself was sold in 1914. (Note: In 1930, the University of Cincinnati entered into an agreement with the Princeton University Press, whereby the latter would publish works for the former under the "Princeton University Press for the University of Cincinnati" imprint. This partnership lasted throughout much of the 20th century.)

The modern version of the press was announced in 2016 before officially launching in January 2017. In mid-2017, the press launched the Cincinnati Library Publishing Services (CLiPS) imprint to publish open-access textbooks and academic journals. When the press was active, distribution was handled by the University of Chicago Press's Chicago Distribution Center. In October of 2024, the closure of the University of Cincinnati Press was announced, effective June 30, 2025. Distribution of previously published works is now handled by the University of Minnesota Press.

== See also ==
- List of English-language book publishing companies
- List of university presses
