= Lever Press =

Academic publisher

- Founded: 2016
- Country of origin: Ann Arbor, MI
- Publication types: Books
- Official website: leverpress.org

Lever Press is a university press, based out of Ann Arbor, MI. Though founded in 2016 with the help of Michigan Publishing, Amherst College Press, and the Oberlin Group, Lever Press is not affiliated with a single university. Instead, it represents a consortium of universities, each of which helps govern and guide the press. All publications issued by the press are released as open access works, with the cost of production being paid for by the participating universities. The press is a member of the Association of University Presses.

== Participating institutions ==
Participating institutions include the following:

- Amherst College
- Atlanta University Center Consortium
- Berea College
- Bowdoin College
- Carleton College
- Central Washington University
- Claremont Graduate University
- Claremont McKenna College
- Clark Atlanta University
- College of Wooster
- College of Saint Benedict and Saint John's University
- Davidson College
- Denison University
- DePauw University
- Grinnell College
- Hamilton College
- Hampshire College
- Harvey Mudd College
- Hollins University
- Iowa State University
- Keck Graduate Institute
- Knox College
- Lafayette College
- Macalester College
- Middlebury College
- Morehouse College
- Morehouse School of Medicine
- Norwich University
- Occidental College
- Penn State University
- Pitzer College
- Pomona College
- Randolph-Macon College
- Rollins College
- Santa Clara University
- Scripps College
- Skidmore College
- Smith College
- Spelman College
- Susquehanna University
- Swarthmore College
- Trinity University
- Union College
- University of California, Los Angeles Library
- University of Idaho
- University of Northern Colorado
- University of Puget Sound
- University of Rhode Island
- University of San Francisco
- University of Vermont
- Ursinus College
- Vassar College
- Washington and Lee University
- Whitman College
- Whittier College
- Whitworth University
- Willamette University
- Williams College

== See also ==
- List of English-language book publishing companies
- List of university presses
- University of Michigan Library
- University of Michigan Press
