= Iowa State University Digital Press =

American university press

- Parent company: Iowa State University Library
- Status: Active
- Founded: 2018
- Country of origin: United States
- Headquarters location: Ames, Iowa
- Publication types: Books, journals
- Nonfiction topics: academic research, scholarly monographs, open textbooks
- Official website: www.iastatedigitalpress.com

The Iowa State University Digital Press (also known as ISUDP) is a digital university press affiliated with Iowa State University, located in Ames, Iowa. The press, which is a unit of the Iowa State University Library, was organized in 2018 and is dedicated to the creation, publication, and dissemination of open-access books and journal articles.

Often seen as a successor of sorts to the Iowa State University Press (a now-defunct publisher that had previously been an active member of the Association of American University Presses), the Iowa State University Digital Press was founded to "support of Iowa State University’s land-grant mission." The publisher is currently a member of the Library Publishing Coalition.

== Publications ==
=== Notable journals ===
- Journal of Librarianship and Scholarly Communication
- Journal of Technology, Management, and Applied Engineering
- Meat and Muscle Biology

=== Notable proceedings ===
- International Interactive Symposium on Ultra-High Performance Concrete
- International Textile and Apparel Association Annual Conference Proceedings
- Pronunciation in Second Language Learning and Teaching Proceedings

== See also ==
- List of English-language book publishing companies
- List of university presses
