= Association of University Presses of Latin America and the Caribbean =

Association of University Presses of Latin America and the Caribbean (Spanish: Asociación de Editoriales Universitarias de América Latina y el Caribe), often referred to as EULAC, is an association of university presses located in South America and the Caribbean. The association also maintains the Latin American University Presses Rights Catalog, which records and publicizes academic works published by South American and Caribbean presses.

== See also ==
- List of university presses
