= Vanderbilt University Press =

University press of Vanderbilt University

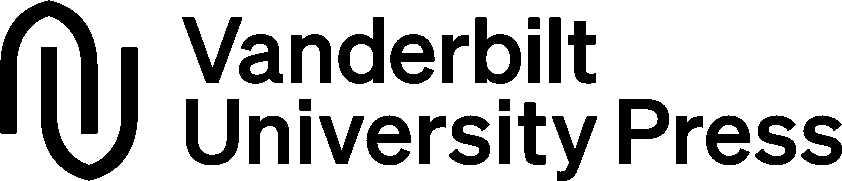
- Parent company: Vanderbilt University
- Founded: 1940
- Country of origin: United States
- Headquarters location: Nashville, Tennessee
- Distribution: Longleaf Services
- Publication types: Books
- Official website: www.vanderbilt.edu/university-press/

Vanderbilt University Press is a university press that is part of Vanderbilt University in Nashville, Tennessee. The Press publishes a variety of scholarly texts, especially in the areas of the humanities and social sciences, health care, and education. The Press also publishes local books and music for the general public. As of 2020, the press publishes around 21 titles annually.

Vanderbilt University Press is currently a member of the Association of University Presses, to which it was admitted in 1993. Domestic distribution for the press is currently provided by the University of North Carolina Press's Longleaf Services.

== See also ==
- List of English-language book publishing companies
- List of university presses
