= University of North Georgia Press =

University press

- Parent company: University of North Georgia
- Founded: 2009
- Publication types: Books
- Official website: ung.edu/university-press/

University of North Georgia Press, founded in 2009, is a university press operated by University of North Georgia that specializes in open-access monographs, textbooks, and children's books. In 2020, a Journal of Electronic Publishing reported that it was one of the "top university press publisher of open textbooks in terms of sheer output".

University of North Georgia Press is an affiliate member of the Association of University Presses, to which it was admitted in 2021. It is also an "Affordable Learning Georgia" partner and a member of the Association of the United States Army's (AUSA) Book Program.

== See also ==
- List of English-language book publishing companies
- List of university presses
