= University of Vermont Press =

Academic publisher

- Parent company: University of Vermont; UVM Libraries
- Founded: 2023
- Publication types: Books, journals
- Official website: uvm.edu/press/

The University of Vermont Press (UVM Press) is a university press associated with the University of Vermont, located in Burlington, Vermont. An earlier iteration of the press had been a member of the University Press of New England publishing consortium; following the consortium's disbanding in 2018, University of Vermont Press was relaunched in 2023 as a separate publisher specializing in open-access scholarship.

The press is currently overseen by the University of Vermont Libraries and operates as a diamond open access publisher. The University of Vermont Press is currently an introductory member of the Association of University Presses.

== See also ==
- List of English-language book publishing companies
- List of university presses
