= Purdue University Press =

American academic publisher

- Parent company: Purdue University Libraries
- Status: Active
- Founded: 1960
- Country of origin: United States
- Headquarters location: West Lafayette, Indiana
- Distribution: Longleaf Services (United States); Eurospan Group (EMEA, Asia); Scholarly Book Services (Canada)
- No. of employees: 5
- Official website: thepress.purdue.edu

Purdue University Press, founded in 1960, is a university press affiliated with Purdue University and overseen by Purdue University Libraries. Purdue University Press is currently a member of both the Association of University Presses, to which it was admitted in 1993. Domestic distribution for the press is currently provided by the University of North Carolina Press's Longleaf Services.

== History ==
An administrative unit of Purdue University Libraries, Purdue University Press has its roots in the 1960 founding of Purdue University Studies by President Frederick Hovde on a $12,000 grant from the Purdue Research Foundation. This was the result of a committee appointed by Hovde after the Department of English lamented the lack of publishing venues in the humanities. The first editorial board was headed by Robert B. Ogle. William Whalen, director of the Office of Publications, became the part-time director of Purdue University Studies. Verna Emery was managing editor from 1977 to 1990, succeeded by Margaret Hunt who served until 2008. On September 12, 1974, Purdue University Studies became Purdue University Press. In June 1992 Whalen retired and David Sanders was appointed the first full-time director of the press serving until 1996. Also in 1992 administrative responsibility for the press was transferred to the dean of libraries. Press Director Sanders was succeeded by Tom Bacher (1997–2008) and Charles T. Wilkinson (2008–2014). Under Sanders, Bacher, and Wilkinson the range of books published by the press grew to reflect the work from other colleges at Purdue University, especially in the areas of agriculture, health, and engineering. Purdue University Press publishes print and e-book monograph series in a range of subject areas from literary and cultural studies to the study of the human-animal bond. In 1993 Purdue University Press was admitted to membership of the Association of American University Presses. Purdue University Press publishes around 25 books a year and 20 learned journals (e.g., Shofar) in print and/or online in collaboration with Purdue University Libraries.

== See also ==
- List of English-language book publishing companies
- List of university presses
