= SUNY Press =

University press

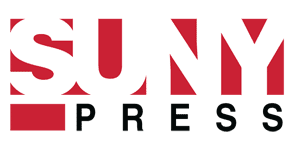
- The SUNY Press logo
- Parent company: State University of New York system
- Founded: 1966; 60 years ago
- Country of origin: United States
- Headquarters location: Albany, New York
- Publication types: Books
- Official website: sunypress.edu

The State University of New York Press (more commonly referred to as the SUNY Press) is a university press affiliated with the State University of New York system. The press, which was founded in 1966, is located in Albany, New York and publishes scholarly works in various fields.

The SUNY Press has agreements with several print-on-demand and electronic vendors, such as Ingram, Integrated Books International, EBSCO, ProQuest, Project MUSE, the Philosophy Documentation Center, Google, and Amazon. Books published by SUNY Press are 80% scholarly works from professors within the SUNY system or other schools and universities. The remaining 20% are aimed at a general audience.

The press is a member of the Association of University Presses.

== See also ==
- List of English-language book publishing companies
- List of university presses
