= Trinity University Press =

University press

- Parent company: Trinity University
- Founded: 1967 (original); 2002 (revival)
- Country of origin: United States
- Headquarters location: San Antonio, Texas
- Publication types: Books
- Official website: tupress.org

Trinity University Press is a university press affiliated with Trinity University, which is located in San Antonio, Texas. Trinity University Press was officially founded in 1967 after the university acquired the Illinois-based Principia Press. This iteration of the press closed in 1989; the press was then revived in 2002. In September 2025, citing costs, Trinity University announced that the press would be closing at the end of 2026.

In addition to the main university press name, the press also issues books through the Trinta Books, Terra Firma, Maverick, and ArteKids publishing imprints. Trinity University Press is a member of the Association of University Presses.

== See also ==
- List of English-language book publishing companies
- List of university presses
