= Truman State University Press =

Defunct American publisher

- Parent company: Truman State University
- Status: defunct
- Founded: 1986
- Country of origin: United States
- Headquarters location: Kirksville, Missouri
- Publication types: books
- Official website: tsup.truman.edu

Truman State University Press (also known as TSU Press) was a university press associated with Truman State University, located in Kirksville, Missouri. Truman State University Press, which was established in 1986 as "Thomas Jefferson University Press", began to phase out its operations in 2017; it officially closed in 2021.

During its time in operation, the press published the Peter Martyr Vermigli Library (now published by the Davenant Institute) and the Early Modern Studies series (now published by Penn State University Press). Until its closure, the Truman State University Press was a member of the Association of University Presses.

== See also ==
- List of English-language book publishing companies
- List of university presses
