= West Point Press =

University press

- Parent company: United States Military Academy
- Country of origin: United States
- Headquarters location: New York City
- Publication types: Books
- Official website: westpointpress.com

West Point Press is a university press affiliated with the United States Military Academy (colloquially known as "West Point"), which is located in West Point, New York. The press was launched in 2023 to publish academic journals, monographs, and digital textbooks, among other works. West Point Press is currently an introductory member of the Association of University Presses.

== See also ==
- List of English-language book publishing companies
- List of university presses
