= Amherst College Press =

Academic publisher

- Parent company: Amherst College Library
- Founded: 2014
- Publication types: Books
- Official website: acpress.amherst.edu

Amherst College Press, founded in 2014, is a new university press (NUP) sponsored by Amherst College, Massachusetts that specializes in open-access monographs. Initially organized by members of the Amherst College Library, the press issues books via the Fulcrum publishing platform. The press, which is currently an affiliate of the Association of University Presses, publishes all of its digital work through platinum open access licenses.

Amherst College Press, in partnership with Michigan Publishing and the Oberlin Group of Libraries, helped launch Lever Press in 2016.

== Publications ==
=== Book series ===
Notable book and monograph series published by Amherst College Press include the following:

- "Public Works: Insights from the Humanities on Issues in the Public Square"
- "Studies in Ethnomusicology"

== See also ==
- List of English-language book publishing companies
- List of university presses
- Michigan Publishing
