= Associated University Presses =

American publishing consortium

- Company type: private
- Industry: academic publishing
- Genre: humanities, literature and literary criticism
- Founded: 1966
- Founder: Thomas Yoseloff
- Defunct: 2022
- Headquarters: Plainsboro, NJ, USA
- Key people: Thomas Yoseloff president 1966–2000; Julien Yoseloff director 1966–
- Products: books
- Services: book publishing & distribution
- Owner: Julien Yoseloff
- Number of employees: 2
- Website: www.aupresses.com

Associated University Presses (AUP) was a publishing company based in the United States, formed and operated as a consortium of several American university presses. AUP was established in 1966, with the first titles published through AUP appearing in 1968. There were five constituent members in the AUP consortium—Bucknell University Press, University of Delaware Press, Fairleigh Dickinson University Press, Lehigh University Press, and Susquehanna University Press. Each member university press maintained its own imprint and editorial control over their published titles, while book production and distribution (both national and international) was the responsibility of AUP.

Over 4000 individual titles were issued by AUP under the imprints of the constituent presses, representing a cross-section of academic and scholarly fields. AUP also acted as a distributor of publications from a number of institutes and organizations, such as the Balch Institute for Ethnic Studies and the Folger Shakespeare Library.

== History ==
Associated University Presses was founded in 1966 by the publisher Thomas Yoseloff, a former director of the University of Pennsylvania Press in the preceding decade. Yoseloff set up AUP as a publishing co-venture targeted at small- to medium-sized academic publishers. He devised a unique operating model whereby the central AUP office retained responsibility for business operations, distribution, printing and publishing costs, while the member presses each exercised their own control over editorial decisions, selections and title acquisitions.

The first university press to join with AUP was at Fairleigh Dickinson University, New Jersey. The FDU Press had been created in 1967 and became an AUP member shortly thereafter. This was followed by Bucknell University's press, founded in 1968 and joined with AUP the same year. University of Delaware's press signed in 1975, and Susquehanna University press in 1981. Lehigh University's press was established and joined in 1985.

Thomas Yoseloff retired in 2000, and was succeeded by his son, Julien. Thomas died on 24 December 2007 aged 94, after a career in publishing that spanned six decades. Julien Yoseloff became the sole owner of AUP's parent company in 2000 and continued as managing director of AUP. AUP ceased most new publishing in 2010 but continued to publish annual volumes in various series. Bucknell University Press, University of Delaware Press, Fairleigh Dickinson University Press and Lehigh University Press entered into a new publishing and distribution agreement with Rowman & Littlefield, while Susquehanna University Press temporarily ceased operations. Starting in July 2018 Bucknell began a new partnership with Rutgers University Press and Delaware with the University of Virginia Press. In August 2022, Susquehanna University Press relaunched with a direct-distribution model.

AUP published titles almost exclusively in the humanities research fields, with the bulk of its titles, some three-quarters of its accumulated publication backlist, in the sectors of literature, literary theory and literary criticism.

AUP ceased all new publishing after 2022. They continue to license electronic, reprint, and other rights from titles they published. Former Associated University Presses titles are now distributed by Rowman and Littlefield.

== See also ==
- List of English-language book publishing companies
- List of university presses
