= The Press at Cal Poly Humboldt =

Academic publisher

- Parent company: Cal Poly Humboldt Library
- Founded: 2015
- Country of origin: United States
- Headquarters location: Arcata, California
- Publication types: Books, journals
- Official website: press.humboldt.edu

The Press at Cal Poly Humboldt is a university press sponsored by Cal Poly Humboldt Library (a division of California State Polytechnic University, Humboldt). Originally organized as the Humboldt State University Press before being relaunched under the present name in 2015, the Press at Cal Poly Humboldt specializes in the publication of open-access monographs, textbooks, and academic journals, but also publishes works of fiction and poetry. As of October 2023, it is the only university press associated with the California State University system.

The Press publishes works by or in support of the campus community, and offers its intellectual and creative works openly through Digital Commons.

== Publications ==
=== Notable journals ===
- The CSU Journal of Sustainability and Climate Change
- Humboldt Journal of Social Relations
- CouRaGeouS Cuentos: A Journal of Counternarratives

=== Notable books ===
- The Extraordinary Voyage of Kamome: A Tsunami Boat Comes Home (2015) by Lori Dengler and Amya Miller, illustrated by Amy Uyeki
- The Gray Bird Sings: The Extraordinary Life of Betty Kwan Chinn (2023) by Karen M. Price
- Trịnh Công Sơn and Bob Dylan: Essays on War, Love, Songwriting and Religion (2023) by John C. Schafer
- Sewing Their Stories, Telling Their Lives: Embroidered Narratives from Chile to the World Stage (1969-2016) (2019) by Martha J. Manier
- Far Less (2020) by Kathy Wollenburg
- Võ Phiến and the Sadness of Exile (2016) by John C. Schafer

=== Notable textbooks ===
- Spanish I: Beginning Spanish Language and Culture (2020) by Matthew Dean
- The American LGBTQ Rights Movement: An Introduction (2020) by Kyle Morgan and Meg Rodriguez

== See also ==
- List of English-language book publishing companies
- List of university presses
