= University Press of Sewanee =

- Industry: academic publishing
- Founded: 1880
- Fate: defunct c. 1985–91
- Headquarters: Sewanee, Tennessee, US
- Products: books, academic journals
- Parent: The University of the South

University Press of Sewanee was a university press affiliated with the University of the South, located in Sewanee, Tennessee. Largely the brainchild of Bishop Leonidas Polk, who believed that it would be "an integral part of the institution", the University Press of Sewanee was founded in 1880. This made it one of the first university presses to issue publications under a university imprint in the United States.

According to a 1991 report made by the university's Print Services department, the earliest incarnation of the press was an unofficial and largely independent operation. The press was officially incorporated on July 28, 1905, and soon after, capital stock worth $20,000 was raised to support the endeavor. Initially, the press was not owned by the university, but in 1931, the press surrendered its charter and was absorbed into the university.

The press published the "Sewanee Theological Library" textbook series, the Sewanee Review (issued quarterly), and the magazine Pathfinder (a monthly publication established by Glen Levin Swiggett that was devoted to art and literature). John Graham Sutherland, who died in 1985, is the last individual credited in the Bulletin of the University of the South as "Manager of the University Press". In 1985, the university decided to halt "print publications and complex jobs" via the press, and by 1991, the publishing authority of the university had been assigned to the director of Public Relations.

== See also ==
- List of English-language book publishing companies
- List of university presses
