= University Press of New England =

American university publisher

- Status: Defunct (2018)
- Founded: 1970
- Country of origin: United States
- Headquarters location: Lebanon, New Hampshire
- Distribution: Self-distributed (US); University of Toronto Press (Canada); Oxbow Books (EMEA); East-West Export Books (Asia Pacific)
- Publication types: Books
- Imprints: ForeEdge; Northeastern University Press; Brandeis University Press; University of New Hampshire Press; Tufts University University Press; University of Vermont Press; Dartmouth College Press
- Official website: (April 2018 archive)

The University Press of New England (UPNE), located in Lebanon, New Hampshire and founded in 1970, was a university press consortium including Brandeis University, Dartmouth College (its host member), Tufts University, the University of New Hampshire, and Northeastern University. It shut down in 2018 and in January 2021, Brandeis University became the sole owner of all titles and copyrights of UPNE, excluding Dartmouth College Press titles.

Notable fiction authors published by UPNE include Howard Frank Mosher, Roxana Robinson, Ernest Hebert, Cathie Pelletier, Chris Bohjalian, Percival Everett, Laurie Alberts and W.D. Wetherell. Notable poets distributed by the press include Rae Armantrout, Claudia Rankine, James Tate, Mary Ruefle, Donald Revell, Ellen Bryant Voigt, James Wright, Jean Valentine, Stanley Kunitz, Heather McHugh, and Yusef Komunyakaa. Notable nature and environment authors published include William Sargent, Cynthia Huntington, David Gessner, John Hay, Tom Wessels and Eric Zencey. Notable scholarly authors published by UPNE and its members include Kathleen J. Ferraro, Jehuda Reinharz, Joyce Antler, Peter Gizzi, Mary Caroline Richards, Leslie Cannold, Colin Calloway, David Fishman, Diana Muir, Wolfgang Mieder, and Gina Barreca. UPNE and its authors and titles have received many honors and awards including the National Book Award, Pulitzer Prize, Guggenheim Fellowships, NEA Literature Fellowships, and the Barnes & Noble Discovery Award.

The press published books for scholars, educators, students, and the general public, concentrating on American studies, literature, history, and cultural studies; art, architecture, and material culture; ethnic studies (African American, Jewish, Native American, Shaker, and international studies); nature and the environment; and New England history and culture. It published around sixty titles annually, and distributed titles for a number of other small and academic presses, museums and non-profit societies.

== Distribution partners ==
All titles published by

- Academia Press
- Bibliopola Press
- CavanKerry Press
- Chipstone Foundation
- Four Way Books
- International Polar Institute
- Nightboat Books
- The Sheep Meadow Press
- Tagus Press
- Wesleyan University Press
- Winterthur Museum

Selected titles published by

- Art Services International
- Hood Museum of Art
- Lyman Allyn Art Museum
- New Britain Museum of American Art
- Wadsworth Atheneum
- Winterthur Museum

== Former imprints ==
- Brandeis University Press
- Dartmouth College Press
- ForeEdge
- Northeastern University Press
- Tufts University Press
- University of New Hampshire Press
- University of Vermont Press

== See also ==
- List of English-language book publishing companies
- List of university presses
