= Association of European University Presses =

Organization of university presses

The Association of European University Presses (AEUP) is an organisation of and for university presses across Europe. As of March 2021, it has 43 members from 18 countries.

== Mission ==
The Association of European University Presses aims to enhance the visibility of member presses, facilitate communication between them, share knowledge about and support for scholarly publishing. The Association cooperates with other international institutions like the Association of University Presses and is a partner organisation to European research infrastructure OPERAS.

== History ==
The Association of European University Presses was founded in 2010 by a number of university presses who feel the need to reach out to each other in order to work together in reaching common goals. It was launched at the Frankfurt Bookfair on 7 October 2010. In March 2011 the Association was officially declared in the Journal Officiel de la République Française. Since the very beginning the focus was on a joint catalogue which was launched in 2014. In 2017 the Association organised the first AEUP conference on “Going digital in Europe” hosted by Stockholm University Press and the Stockholm University Library. The second AEUP conference on “(Re-)Shaping University Presses and Institutional Publishing” was held in 2019 and was hosted by Masaryk University, Brno, Czech Republic on the occasion of its 100th anniversary. In 2020 the AEUP co-organised an online workshop on multilingualism as a satellite event of the annual conference of the Open Access Scholarly Publishing Association (OASPA). Since the beginning the Association organises joint stand at large book fairs such as Frankfurt Book Fair and holds its annual meeting each year at the fair.

== Members ==
AEUP members fall into the following groups:

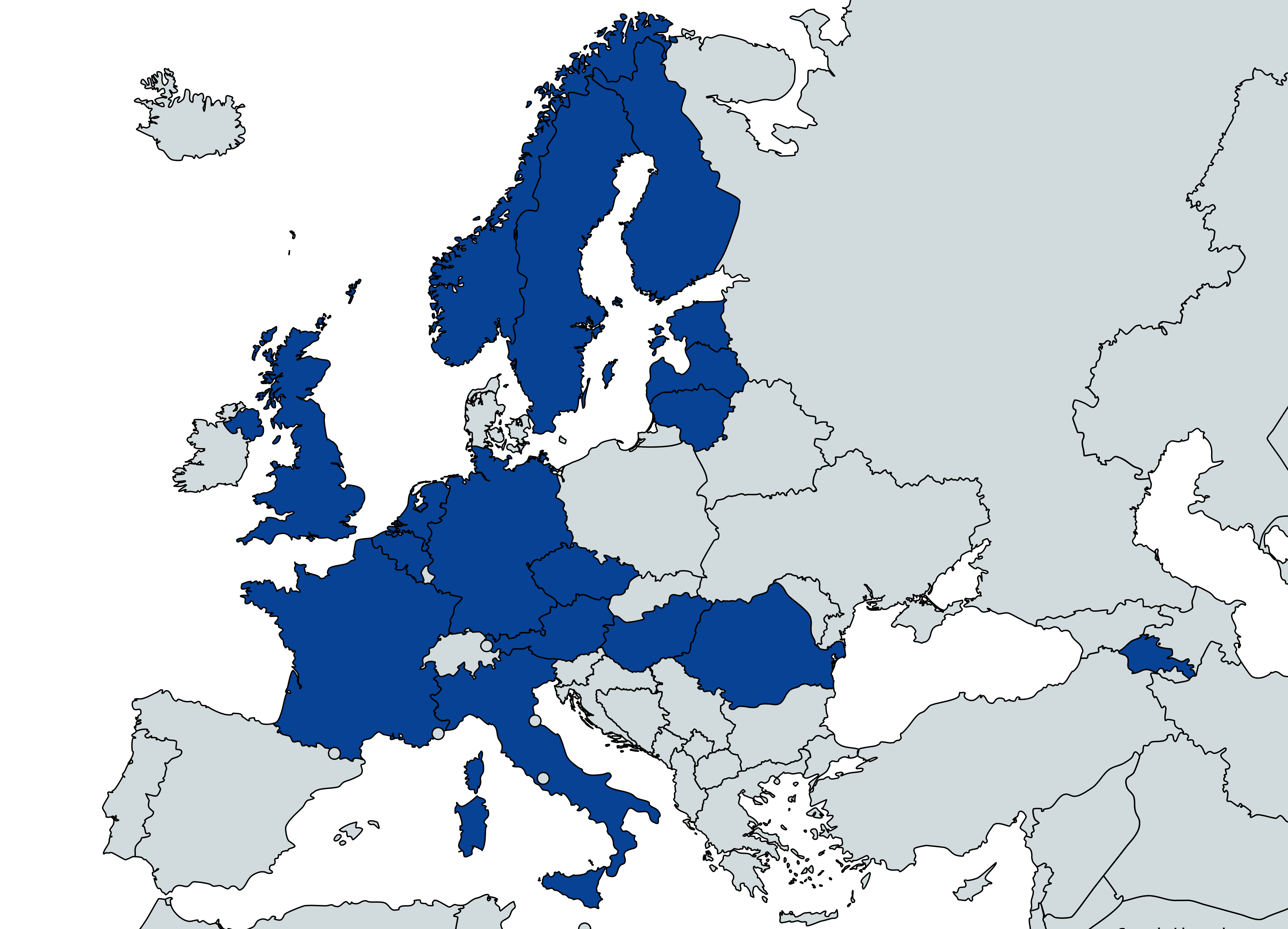
AEUP has 43 members from 18 countries.

- Full members – in order to become a full member, the press needs to meet the criteria such as to belong to or be formally linked to an academic institution (university, research institute or learned society); to have a clearly defined editorial policy; to apply selection and peer-review procedures; to respect professional ethics in relation with authors, other publishers, and professional partners; and others.
- Associate members – need to meet all criteria except for the formal relationship with a university or research body. Instead they will have to have an established relationship with such a body.
- Patron members – other publishing organisations supporting the mission of the AEUP.

== See also ==
- Academic publishing
- Library publishing
- Open access
