= University of Maine Press =

University press

The University of Maine Press is a university press that is part of the University of Maine. It is a Division of the Raymond H. Fogler Library. According to the Press, "the diverse cultural heritage of Northern New England, Quebec, and the Maritimes is the Press’s central interest. The Press publishes books in science, the arts, and the humanities, reflecting the educational mission of the University of Maine".

== See also ==
- List of English-language book publishing companies
- List of university presses
