= Pacific University Press =

University press

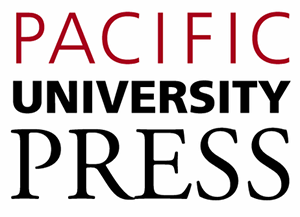
- The logo of Pacific University Press
- Parent company: Pacific University Libraries
- Founded: 2015
- Country of origin: United States
- Headquarters location: Forest Grove, Oregon
- Publication types: Books
- Official website: lib.pacificu.edu/create/pup/

Pacific University Press is a university press affiliated with Pacific University, located in Forest Grove, Oregon. Operated by the university's library, the press was formally established in 2015 and built off the library's established journal publishing initiative (which began in 2009). The publisher is currently a member of the Library Publishing Coalition.

== See also ==
- List of English-language book publishing companies
- List of university presses
