= Southeast Missouri State University Press =

University press

- Parent company: Southeast Missouri State University
- Founded: 2001
- Country of origin: United States
- Headquarters location: Cape Girardeau, Missouri
- Publication types: Books
- Official website: semopress.com

The Southeast Missouri State University Press is a university press affiliated with Southeast Missouri State University, located in Cape Girardeau, Missouri. Southeast Missouri State University Press, in association with Southeast Missouri State University, offers a minor in "Small-press Publishing" for students "who wish to acquire the basic skills for independent-press publishing and editing".

== Literary prizes ==
The Southeast Missouri State University Press hosts several literary awards, including the following:

- Cowles Poetry Book Prize: This prize is awarded to the author of a poem collection. Winning entries are published by the press, with the author receiving a $2,000 prize and 30 complimentary copies of the work.
- Nilsen Literary Prize for a First Novel: This prize is awarded to a first-time novelist. Winning entries are published by the press, with the author receiving a $1,000 prize.
- Proud to Be: Writing by American Warriors: This contest celebrates short literary works that evokatively convey the "military service perspectives of ... soldiers and veterans of all conflicts". Winning entries are publishing in an anthology series that is released annually by the press.

== See also ==
- List of English-language book publishing companies
- List of university presses
