= Seward's Folly (book) =

2016 non-fiction book

- Author: Lee A. Farrow
- Publisher: University of Alaska Press
- Publication date: 2016
- ISBN: 9781602233041

Seward's Folly: A New Look at the Alaska Purchase is a non-fiction book by Lee A. Farrow about the Alaska Purchase. It was published in 2016 by the University of Alaska Press.

== General references ==
- Hartgrove, Dane (2017-12-01). "Seward's Folly: A New Look at the Alaska Purchase". Journal of American History. 104 (3): 777–777. doi:10.1093/jahist/jax360. ISSN 0021-8723.
- James, David A. "Insightful new look at 'Seward's Folly'". Anchorage Daily News.
- Perras, Galen Roger (2018-06-01). "Lee A. Farrow. Seward's Folly: A New Look at the Alaska Purchase". The American Historical Review. 123 (3): 957–958. doi:10.1093/ahr/123.3.957. ISSN 0002-8762.
