= International Convention of University Presses =

The International Convention of University Presses is an annual meeting at the Frankfurt Book Fair since 2013, where around 100 university presses from around the world meet and discuss joint challenges.

== Founding ==
University Presses from 18 countries gathered together on the Founding Convention in 2013. They discussed how to spread knowledge worldwide through open access and cooperation, how to internationalize university presses because of the internationalization of scholarship e.g. through multilingualism, how to enhance the quality of the publications through peer review and other means. On the meeting, the founding of an international association of university presses was demanded, which resulted in the founding of the non-profit Association of University Presses (AUP) in 2013/2014.

== Development ==
The Convention in 2014 with around 70 participating university presses was organized with the help of the Association of American University Presses (AAUP) and the Argentinian Network of National University Presses (REUN). One of the topics discussed was the self perception of university presses in contrast to (commercial) scientific publishers.

When the Convention met for its 2nd time in 2014, the Association of University Presses (AUP) had already more than 30 members from all continents, including several regional associations of university presses, again with several members, of which some were present at the convention.

== Aims ==
The Convention strives among its worldwide member presses for internationalization, exchange, quality assurance (Peer Review), Translation and Digitalization (eBooks, open access, establishment of an information data base for printing subsidy grants and translations). These topics are dealt with in workshops on the convention.
