= Éditions Alphil - Presses universitaires suisses =

Éditions Alphil - Presses universitaires suisses is a university press located in Neuchâtel, Switzerland.

== History ==
Éditions Alphil - Presses universitaires suisses was founded in 1996 by Alain and Philippe Erard Cortat under the name Éditions Alphil. The name is a contraction of the names of the founders. After the publication of his first book, Philippe Erard pulled out of the company, while Alain Cortat continued the publishing business, specializing in academic publishing. In 2007, Alain Cortat divided the business into two sectors: Éditions Alphil, which now specializes in publishing stories, novels, essays and fine books, and Alphil-Presses universitaires suisses, which specializes in publishing academic books.
