= Brandeis University Press =

Academic publisher

- Parent company: Brandeis University Press
- Founded: 1971 (as part of UPNE); 2019 (standalone)
- Distribution: University of Chicago Press
- Publication types: Books
- Official website: brandeisuniversitypress.com

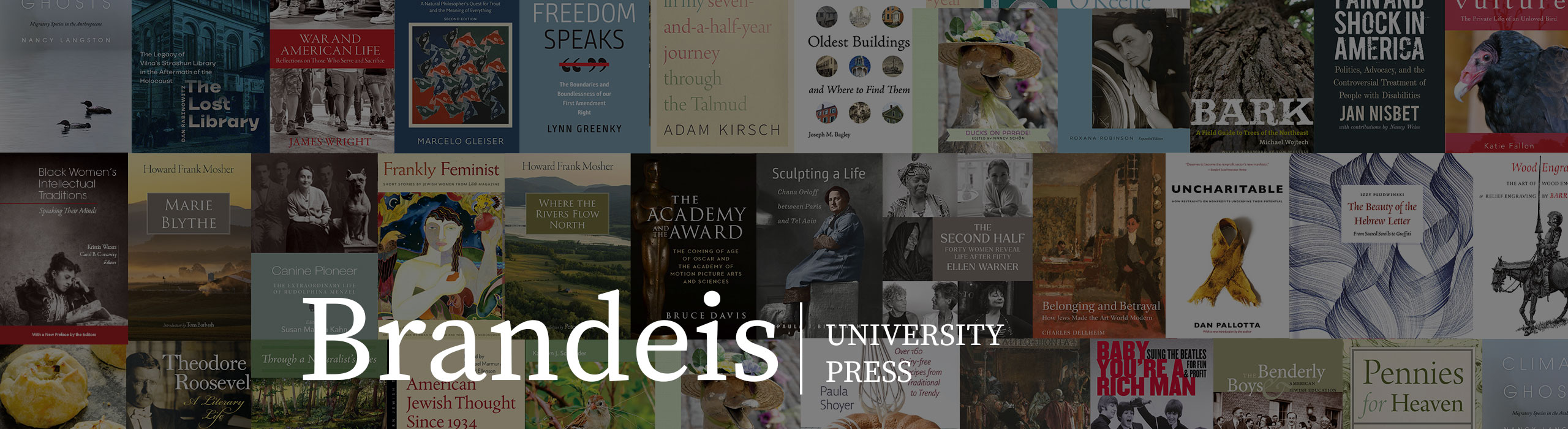
Banner of Brandeis University Press Website

Brandeis University Press is a university press supported by Brandeis University, a private research university in Waltham, Massachusetts. It publishes a wide range of academic titles as well as trade books. The press was originally founded in 1971 as an imprint of the University Press of New England publishing consortium, but following the consortium's disbanding in 2018, Brandeis University Press was relaunched in 2019 as a separate publisher. Brandeis University Press is distributed by The Chicago Distribution Center.

Brandeis University Press is perhaps best known for its books that focus on Jewish studies, and they have recently began to specialize in books that focus on New England, as well as the Environment and Nature. In 2021, Brandeis University Press secured the rights to the University Press of New England's catalog of past publications, and in 2023 they acquired Dartmouth College Press.

== See also ==
- List of English-language book publishing companies
- List of university presses
