= UI Press =

UI Press may refer to one of several university publishers:

- University of Illinois Press, United States
- University of Indonesia Press, Indonesia
- University of Iowa Press, United States
