= Washington State University Press =

University publishing company

- Parent company: Washington State University
- Country of origin: United States
- Headquarters location: Pullman, Washington
- Publication types: Books, journals
- Official website: wsupress.wsu.edu

Washington State University Press (or WSU Press) is a university press that is part of Washington State University. Initially established in the 1920s before being reorganized in the 1980s, the press has issued over 200 titles. The publisher also distributes titles released by Lost Horse Press.

== See also ==
- List of English-language book publishing companies
- List of university presses
