= Wydawnictwo Uniwersytetu Jagiellońskiego =

Polish university press

Wydawnictwo Uniwersytetu Jagiellońskiego is a university press affiliated with the Jagiellonian University in Poland. Founded in 1996, it publishes about 200 books per year.
