= University Press of Colorado =

Publisher in Colorado, United States

- Founded: 1965
- Country of origin: USA
- Headquarters location: Denver, Colorado
- Distribution: Chicago Distribution Center (US); Codasat Canada (Canada)
- Publication types: Books
- Fiction genres: Novel (since 1993)
- Imprints: Utah State University Press
- Official website: upcolorado.com

The University Press of Colorado is a nonprofit publisher that was established in 1965. It is currently a member of the Association of University Presses and has been since 1982.

Initially associated with Colorado public universities, the University Press of Colorado is currently a multi-state consortium supported by certain Colorado-based public universities (viz., Adams State University, Colorado State University, Fort Lewis College, Metropolitan State University of Denver, the University of Colorado System, the University of Northern Colorado, Western Colorado University, and the Colorado School of Mines), a Colorado-based private university (viz., Regis University), and three non-Colorado-based universities (viz. the University of Alaska System, Utah State University, and the University of Wyoming). This makes it one of the few university presses in the United States to have more than one affiliate university.

== Imprints ==
=== University of Alaska Press ===
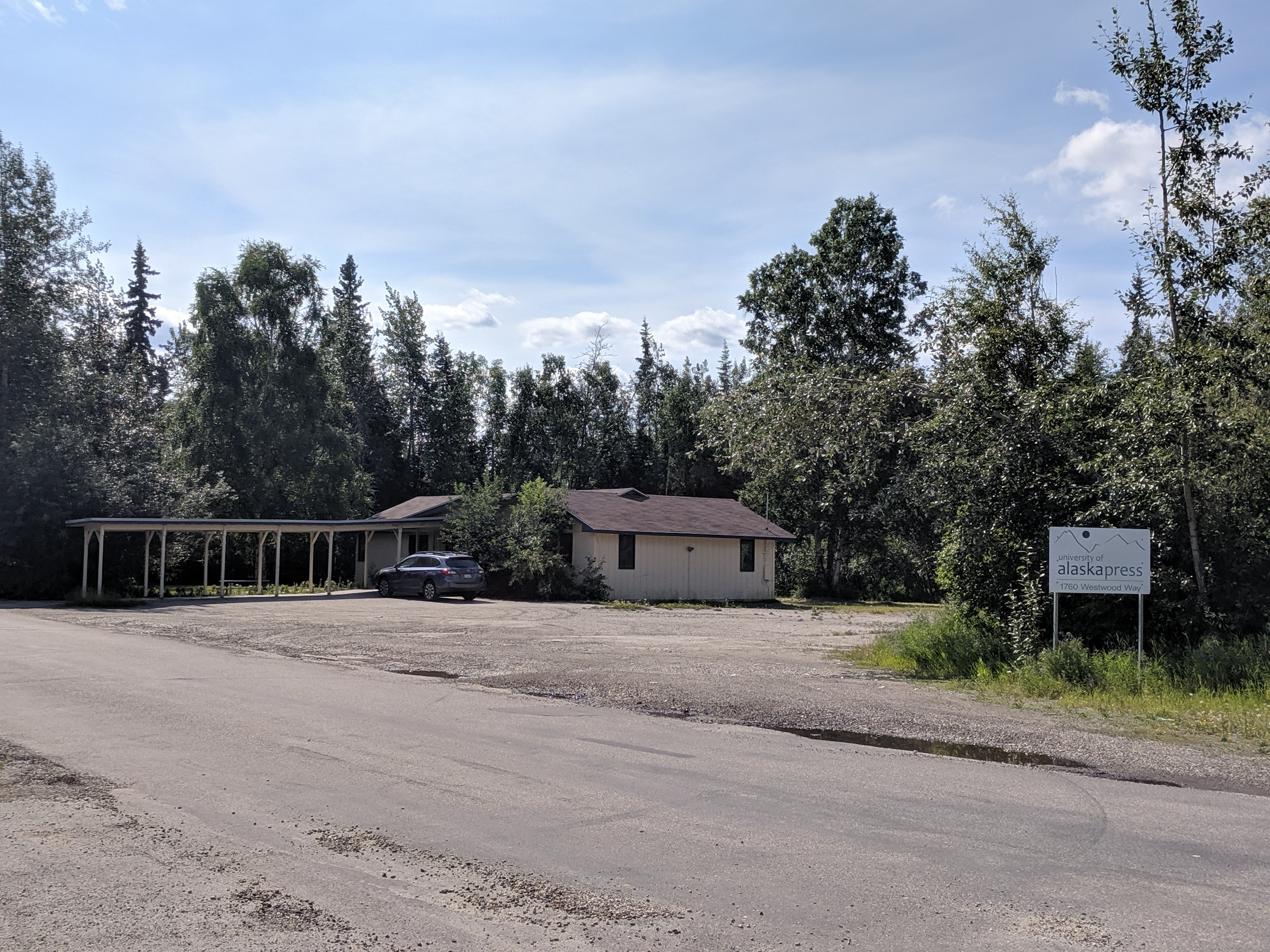
A roadside picture of the University of Alaska Press in Fairbanks

The University of Alaska Press (also known as the UA press) is a university press imprint associated with the University of Alaska. The press distributes works concerning Alaska, the northern Pacific Rim, and the circumpolar regions. Founded in 1987, the press joined the University Press of Colorado consortium in 2021.

=== University of Wyoming Press ===
The University of Wyoming Press (also known as UWyoP) is a university press imprint associated with the University of Wyoming, located in Laramie, Wyoming. The press publishes books that focus on the state of Wyoming and the surrounding area; it also publishes books about democracy, the public humanities, and the environmental humanities. The University of Wyoming Press joined the University Press of Colorado consortium in 2019.

=== Utah State University Press ===
Utah State University Press (also known as USU Press), founded in 1972, is a university press imprint associated with Utah State University. It publishes works in composition studies, folklore, Mormon history, Native American studies, nature and environment, and western history. The press joined the University Press of Colorado consortium in 2014.

== Controversies ==
University Press of Colorado joined the Association of American Publishers trade organization in the Hachette v. Internet Archive (2023) lawsuit which resulted in the removal of access to over 500,000 books from global readers.

== See also ==
- List of English-language book publishing companies
- List of university presses
