= Muhammadiyah University Press =

Indonesian academic publisher

- Parent company: Muhammadiyah University of Surakarta
- Status: Active
- Founded: 1990
- Founder: Muhammadiyah University of Surakarta
- Country of origin: Indonesia
- Headquarters location: Solo
- Distribution: Worldwide
- Publication types: Books, journals
- Nonfiction topics: Science
- Official website: mup.ums.ac.id

Muhammadiyah University Press (MUP) is an Indonesian publisher owned by Muhammadiyah University of Surakarta in Central Java. Muhammadiyah University Press publishes scientific books and journals.

== Publications ==
MUP publishes 35 scholarly journals and more than 100 new books each year.
