= Fairleigh Dickinson University Press =

American university publishing house

- Parent company: Fairleigh Dickinson University
- Founded: 1967
- Founder: Peter Sammartino and Thomas Yoseloff
- Country of origin: United States
- Headquarters location: Madison, New Jersey & Vancouver, British Columbia
- Distribution: Rowman & Littlefield
- Publication types: Books, Journals
- Official website: www.fdupress.org

Fairleigh Dickinson University Press (FDU Press) is a publishing house under the operation and oversight of Fairleigh Dickinson University, the largest private university in New Jersey.

== History ==
FDU Press was established in 1967 by the university's founder, Peter Sammartino, in collaboration with the publisher Thomas Yoseloff, formerly the director of University of Pennsylvania Press. Yoseloff had left this position in the previous year to found Associated University Presses (AUP), intended to operate as a consortium of small-to-medium-sized university presses and publisher/distributor of humanities scholarship. FDU Press became the first participating member of AUP in 1968.

Charles Angoff was the chief editor of FDU Press from 1967 to 1977. Harry Keyishian was director of the press from 1977 to 2017, and remains on its editorial committee. James Gifford is the current director of FDU Press. When AUP ceased most new publishing in 2010, a new distribution agreement was made with Rowman & Littlefield. The press relocated to FDU's Vancouver campus in July 2017, but retains its editorial committee composed of faculty from the university's campuses and advisory board composed of faculty and publishing professionals from outside FDU. Rowman & Littlefield was acquired by Bloomsbury Publishing in 2024, and FDU Press partnered with Bloomsbury effective June 2024.

FDU Press has issued over 1,500 non-fiction and research titles since its inception, the majority in the fields of literature, literary criticism, arts, history and social sciences.

== See also ==
- List of English-language book publishing companies
- List of university presses
