= Presses universitaires de Louvain =

- Parent company: University of Louvain (UCLouvain)
- Founded: 2000; 25 years ago
- Country of origin: Belgium
- Headquarters location: Louvain-la-Neuve, Belgium
- Publication types: Books, journals
- Official website: pul.uclouvain.be

The Presses universitaires de Louvain (PUL) is a university press of the University of Louvain (UCLouvain) located in Louvain-la-Neuve, Belgium. It was established in 2000 to mark the 575th anniversary of the Old University of Louvain. The Presses universitaires de Louvain publish mainly in French and English, but also occasionally in Spanish, Dutch, Italian, German and other languages. It publishes approximately 50 books annually in every discipline.
