= Bucknell University Press =

University press

- Parent company: Bucknell University
- Defunct: 30 June 2026
- Publication types: Books, journals
- Official website: bucknell.edu/azdirectory/bucknell-university-press

Bucknell University Press is a university press associated with Bucknell University, located in Lewisburg, Pennsylvania. The press was founded in 1968 and is a member of the Association of University Presses, to which it was admitted in 2016.

Bucknell University Press was a member of the now-defunct Associated University Presses consortium. From 2010 to 2017, the press's publications were distributed by Rowman & Littlefield. Presently, the press operates in partnership with Rutgers University Press. While Bucknell University Press maintains editorial control over its own imprint, Rutgers pays for the cost of production and handles global distribution.

Bucknell University Press has published more than 1,200 titles since 1968, with notable strengths in the fields of Iberian, Latin American, Irish, and interdisciplinary 18th-century studies. Nearly 30% of the press's titles published in 2024–2025 have received the American Library Association's Choice "highly recommended" rating. The press also runs an internship program.

On September 4, 2025, Bucknell University provost Wendy F. Sternberg notified the Bucknell community that the university press would cease operations on June 30, 2026. Its funding would be redirected toward undergraduate education.

== Publications ==
=== Notable book series ===
Notable book series published by Bucknell University Press include the following:

- "Aperçus: Histories Texts Cultures", edited by Kat Lecky
- "Bucknell Studies in Latin American Literature and Theory", edited by Aníbal González
- "Contemporary Irish Writers", edited by Anne Fogarty
- "Griot Project Book Series", co-published by the Institute for the Study of Black Lives and Cultures
- "New Studies in the Age of Goethe", edited by John B. Lyon
- "Scènes francophones: Studies in French and Francophone Theater", edited by Logan Connors
- "Stories of the Susquehanna Valley", edited by Alfred Siewers
- "Studies in Eighteenth Century Scotland", edited by Pam Perkins
- "Transits: Literature, Thought & Culture 1650-1850", edited by Mona Narain and Miriam L. Wallace

=== Journals ===
Notable academic journals published by Bucknell University Press include the following:

- 1650-1850: Ideas, Aesthetics, and Inquiries in the Early Modern Era
- The Age of Johnson: A Scholarly Annual
- The Bucknell Review

== See also ==
- List of English-language book publishing companies
- List of university presses
