= Susquehanna University Press =

University press

- Parent company: Susquehanna University
- Founded: 1944
- Country of origin: United States
- Headquarters location: Selinsgrove, Pennsylvania
- Distribution: Self-distributed
- Publication types: Books, Chapbooks, Zines
- Official website: www.susqupress.com

Susquehanna University Press, also known as SU Press, is a non-profit publisher of book-length literary fiction, creative nonfiction, and poetry. Established in 1944 and relaunched in 2022, it is an independent publishing branch of Susquehanna University, where it is affiliated with the English and Creative Writing Department and the Sigmund Weis School of Business.

Susquehanna University Press focuses on debut authors and writers with ties to the Appalachian Region or the Northeast. The Press also publishes limited-edition, handcrafted mini books and zines. It operates as a university publisher, undergraduate learning lab, and small business. Students practice copyediting, layout, and cover design, alongside product development, pricing, publicity, sales, and basic accounting. They also design, manufacture, and sell linocut art prints, greeting cards, patches, and bookmarks.

== History ==
Susquehanna University Press was founded in 1944 with the help of a donation from Dr. Frederic Brush, an author, philanthropist, and retired physician from White Plains, New York. Initially, the Press focused on academic work written by Susquehanna University faculty. In 1981, the Press chose to affiliate with Associated University Presses, a publishing company that handled all production, marketing, distribution, legal, and financial responsibilities. The Press’s focus broadened to scholarly book-length manuscripts, with a particular interest in the humanities and social sciences. When AUP ceased production in 2010, the editorial board decided to go on an indefinite hiatus.

In 2022, the Press relaunched with a focus on trade and regional publishing. Susquehanna University undergraduates became integral players in the Press’s operations, serving as interns and editorial assistants.

== Notable Titles ==
- Practice for Becoming a Ghost: Stories by Patrick Thomas Henry

== See also ==
- List of English-language book publishing companies
- List of university presses
