= University of Delaware Press =

Publisher

- Parent company: University of Delaware
- Founded: 1922
- Country of origin: United States
- Headquarters location: Newark, Delaware
- Distribution: Rowman & Littlefield
- Publication types: books, journals
- Official website: udpress.udel.edu

The University of Delaware Press (UDP) is a publishing house and a department of the University of Delaware in the United States, whose main campus is at Newark, Delaware, where the University Press is also based.

== History ==
The University of Delaware Press was established in 1922 during the presidency of Walter Hullihen. The press was founded with financial support from Service Citizens, a Delaware civic organization, and initially relied on the Press of Kells in Newark for printing services.

Following the death of printer Everett Johnson and the closure of the Press of Kells in 1926, the press became largely inactive. In 1949, a faculty publications committee revived publishing activities through a monograph series, and the press subsequently entered cooperative publishing arrangements with several nearby university presses, including Rutgers University Press, New York University Press, and Temple University Press.

In 1975, the University of Delaware Press joined Associated University Presses (AUP), a consortium of university presses that handled production and distribution while member presses retained editorial control over their imprints.

Following the dissolution of the Associated University Presses arrangement in 2010, the press entered a publishing and distribution partnership with Rowman & Littlefield. In 2018 it transitioned to a partnership with the University of Virginia Press, and since 2021 its books have been produced, marketed, and distributed through Rutgers University Press while the University of Delaware retains editorial control of its imprint.

== Publications ==
The University of Delaware Press publishes approximately 15 to 20 scholarly books annually.

The press is particularly known for publishing works in literary studies, especially Renaissance and early modern literature, eighteenth-century studies, French literature and culture, art history, material culture studies, and cultural studies relating to Delaware and the Eastern Shore.

The press publishes a number of scholarly series, including The Early Modern Exchange, Early Modern Feminisms, Performing Celebrity, Material Culture Perspectives, and Studies in Seventeenth- and Eighteenth-Century Art and Culture.

All manuscripts considered for publication undergo peer review by external scholars before acquisition decisions are made.

== See also ==
- List of English-language book publishing companies
- List of university presses
