= Fudan University Press =

Chinese state publisher

Fudan University Press (Chinese: 复旦大学出版社), a publishing entity of the People's Republic of China, is affiliated with Fudan University and is situated at No. 579 Guoquan Road, Yangpu District, Shanghai.

== History ==
Fudan University Press was formed in May 1981 with the authorization of the General Administration of Press and Publication and the endorsement of the Ministry of Education of the People's Republic of China. Fudan University Press primarily publishes instructional materials pertinent to the subjects, majors, and courses offered at Fudan University, in addition to reference books for higher education, pedagogical tools, and educational resources for colleges and universities associated with higher education instruction. Furthermore, Fudan University Press publishes periodicals like Fudan Journal, Rhetoric Learning, Journalism University, Research and Development Management, World Economy Literature, and Population.

In January 2001, sanctioned by the Ministry of Education and the General Administration of Press and Publication, Fudan University Press and Shanghai Medical University Press amalgamated to form the new Fudan University Press. In 2009, Fudan University Press underwent a restructuring and was rebranded as Fudan University Press Co.
