= Nanjing University Press =

Nanjing University Press (Chinese: 南京大学出版社), established in 1984 and based in Nanjing, is a scholarly publishing house affiliated with Nanjing University.

== History ==
Initially focused on academic works in humanities, social sciences, and natural sciences, it expanded its scope post-2000 to include interdisciplinary studies and cutting-edge research. Renowned for its Library of Chinese Thinkers series and collaborations with institutions like the Chinese Academy of Social Sciences. Awarded "National First-Class Publisher" (Chinese: 全国百佳图书出版单位) in 2017, NUP now publishes over 500 titles annually, covering fields such as philosophy, technology, and environmental studies.
