= The Cheney Report =

The Economic Survey of the Book Industry, known informally as The Cheney Report, was a paper written by retired New York banker O.H. Cheney, between 1930 and 1931. It was commissioned by the National Association of Book Publishers, and later published in 1932. The purpose of the report was to analyze the overall structure of the book publishing industry and to find ways to improve the system as a whole. The report advocated for several revisions to the book publishing industry, including standardization of the physical size of books, increasing the number of children reading books in the education system, and constructing more bookstores in more parts of the country in the United States. Cheney also correctly anticipated the increasing demand for more books at the end of the Second World War, and sought to find ways to better distribute them.

The most important contribution of The Cheney Report to the market of American book publishing, and to American culture as a whole, was his insistence on the implementation of a standardized form of communication within the book publishing world. Cheney was the first person to suggest some kind of machine based coding system for the organization of books. While he did not present a specific plan for this machine based coding system in his report, Cheney's revolutionary ideas helped spur the creation and implementation, several decades later, of the International Standard Book Number (ISBN) that the United States adopted to categorize books.

On the 60th anniversary of The Cheney Report in 1992, Publishers Weekly reprinted the report in full and began to revisit some of the ideas the report originally proposed.

== Reception ==
While the ideas presented in the report later helped establish a system as effective as the ISBN, The Cheney Report was not well received at the time of publication. Cheney claimed to have written the report “in the spirit of objective sympathy”, but the report was mostly met with harsh criticism and considered wildly ineffective by most book industry insiders at the time. Many people felt the ideas he proposed were farfetched, while today the idea of a book coding system, like the ISBN, seems completely logical. One of The Cheney Report supporters did give an alternative reading of The Cheney Report in a 1932 edition of Publishers Weekly:

"Mr. Cheney was not hired to tell us what fine fellows and wonderful men we are. We must have known something was wrong with us or we wouldn't have ordered any survey...Why spend valuable time now looking at what may be wrong with Mr. Cheney? It would be more profitable for each of us to dig out of the report the mass of useful and interesting information, new information, and the many useful and definite suggestions."

— Alfred A. Knopf, Sr., in Publishers Weekly, January 16th, 1932

Almost none of the ideas presented in the report were taken seriously, and it was not until much later in American history that the machine based coding system was invented and implemented. Cheney did not gain much notoriety from this report and the report has largely gone unnoticed in current American culture. Cheney died in 1939 and never got to see his ideas and concepts implemented.
