= National University of San Marcos Press =

Publishing division of San Marcos University, Peru

The Editorial Fund of the National University of San Marcos is the publishing division of the university. It is responsible for the production and dissemination of physical and digital books and magazines that offer new knowledge for the global society. These publications constitute a key pillar in the formation and development of Peruvian humanistic and scientific traditions, and represent the firm commitment of the University of San Marcos to culture and disciplinary research.

The Editorial Fund of University of San Marcos was created in 2002. It had as its predecessor the Publications Directorate, which functioned since the middle of the 20th century. Currently, it belongs to the General Directorate of Libraries and Publications of the Vice-Rector for Research and Postgraduate Studies of the UNMSM. During all these decades, it assumed as a task the provision of editorial services correlated with the teaching and research carried out at the National University of San Marcos by intellectuals and academics from various parts of the world.

For a work to be published under this Fund, it must comply with the publication rules established for such case. After the approval of the document, it goes through a process of editorial review, printing and distribution through multiple commercial channels, in order to disseminate new knowledge in various disciplinary fields (such as literature, history, art, sociology, anthropology, archeology, communication, medicine, philosophy, biology, linguistics, law, among others).

== Selected publications ==
- Understanding Marketing & Technology Without Losing Your Mind (Dave Tedlock, 2013)

== See also ==
- National University of San Marcos
- La Casona de San Marcos
