= University of Indonesia Press =

Penerbit Universitas Indonesia (UI-Press)
- Parent company: University of Indonesia
- Status: Active
- Founded: 1969; 57 years ago
- Country of origin: Indonesia
- Headquarters location: Depok, West Java, Indonesia
- Publication types: Academic journals, textbooks, books
- Nonfiction topics: Academic, scientific, humanities
- Fiction genres: Non-fiction

University of Indonesia Press (Indonesian: Penerbit Universitas Indonesia), also abbreviated UI-Press is the official university press of the Universitas Indonesia (UI). Through $180,000 from a Ford Foundation grant, the press was established in 1969. The scholar Saravanan Gopinathan in 1985 identified it as one of Indonesia's three major university presses alongside UGM Press and the Bandung Institute of Technology Press.
