= Muhammadiyah University of Surakarta =

University in Central Java, Indonesia

- Other names: Universitas Muhammadiyah Surakarta, UMS
- Motto: Islami, Mencerahkan, Unggul, Mendunia, dan Sustainable (I'M UMS) & "Beyond Excellence"
- Established: September 18, 1958
- Rector: Harun Joko Prayitno
- Academic staff: 600
- Administrative staff: 500
- Students: 47440
- Undergraduates: 24000
- Postgraduates: 1000
- Location: Jl. A. Yani Pabelan, Kartasura, Sukoharjo Regency, Central Java, 57169, Indonesia
- Website: ums.ac.id
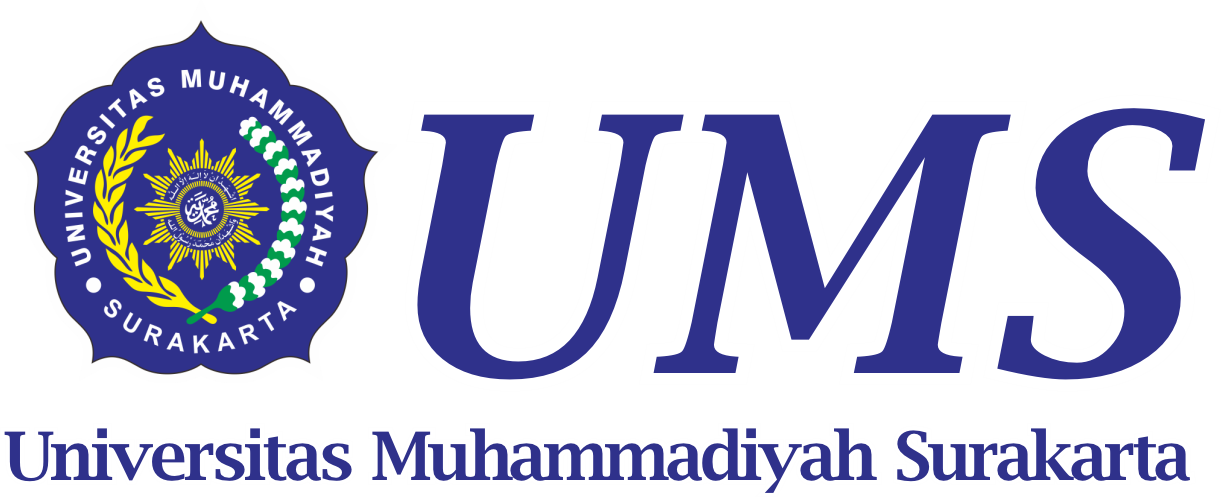

Muhammadiyah University of Surakarta (Indonesian: Universitas Muhammadiyah Surakarta, [univerˈsitas muhamaˈdijah suraˈkarta], UMS) is a private university in Indonesia and one of the country's leading higher education institutions. Established in 1958, the university is located in Kartasura District, Sukoharjo Regency. UMS operates under the Muhammadiyah organization and focuses on Islamic cultural education, scientific scholarship, and skills development based on Islamic values. UMS is the best Islamic university No.1 in Indonesia according to THE WUR (2026). UMS holds an “Unggul” (Excellent) accreditation status, granted by the National Accreditation Board for Higher Education (BAN-PT) through Decree No. 1057/SK/BAN-PT/Ak-PPJ/PT/XII/2021.

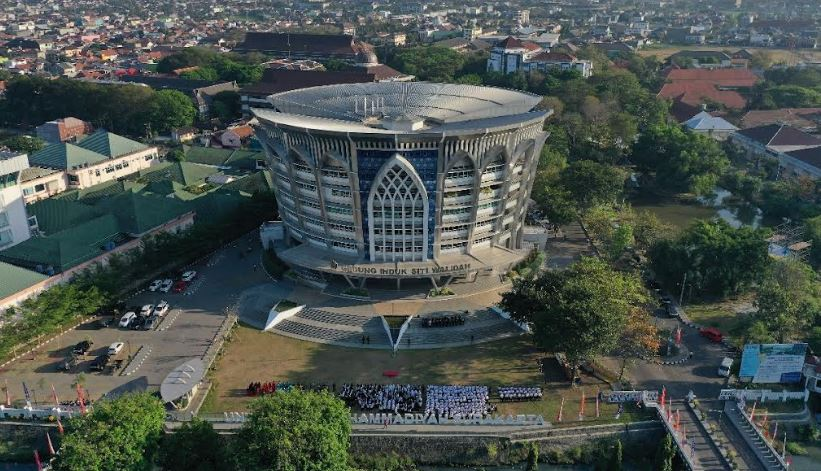
The Siti Walidah main building at UMS Campus 2

UMS currently operates four campuses: Campus 1 on Jalan Ahmad Yani, Pabelan, Kartasura, Surakarta, Central Java; Campus 2 on Jalan Ahmad Yani, Pabelan, Kartasura, Surakarta; Campus 3 on Jalan Kebangkitan Nasional No. 101, Penumping, Laweyan, Surakarta; and Campus 4 on Jalan Garuda Mas, Gonilan, Kartasura, Surakarta.

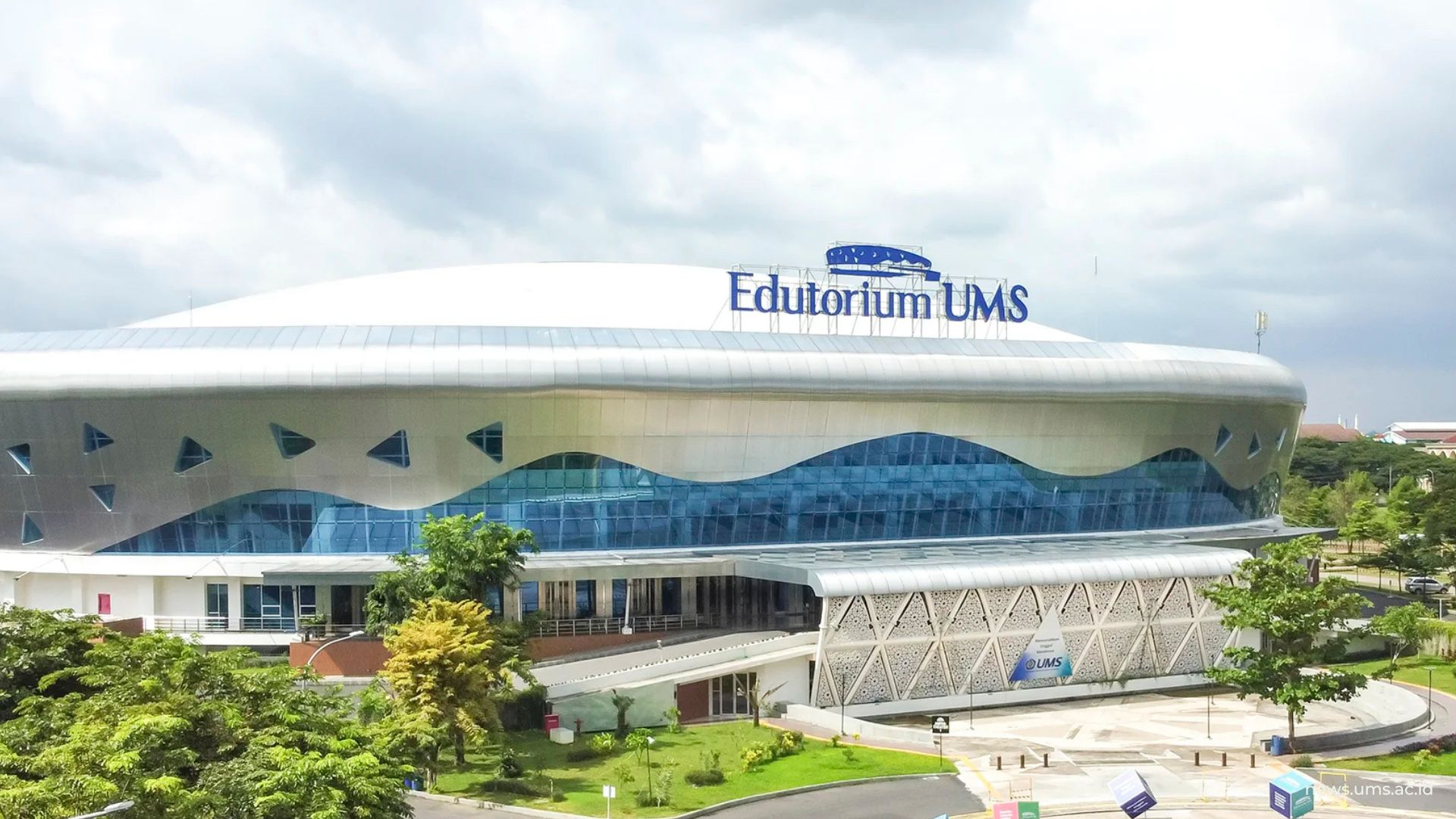
The UMS Edutorium Building

The university also houses the Edutorium UMS, located on Jalan Adi Sucipto No. 33, Karangasem, Laweyan, Surakarta. With a floor area of 14,400 m^{2} and a capacity of 10,000 people, the building is regarded as the largest and most prominent hall in Central Java. The structure often compared to the Allianz Arena served as the main venue for the 48th Muhammadiyah Congress (Muktamar).

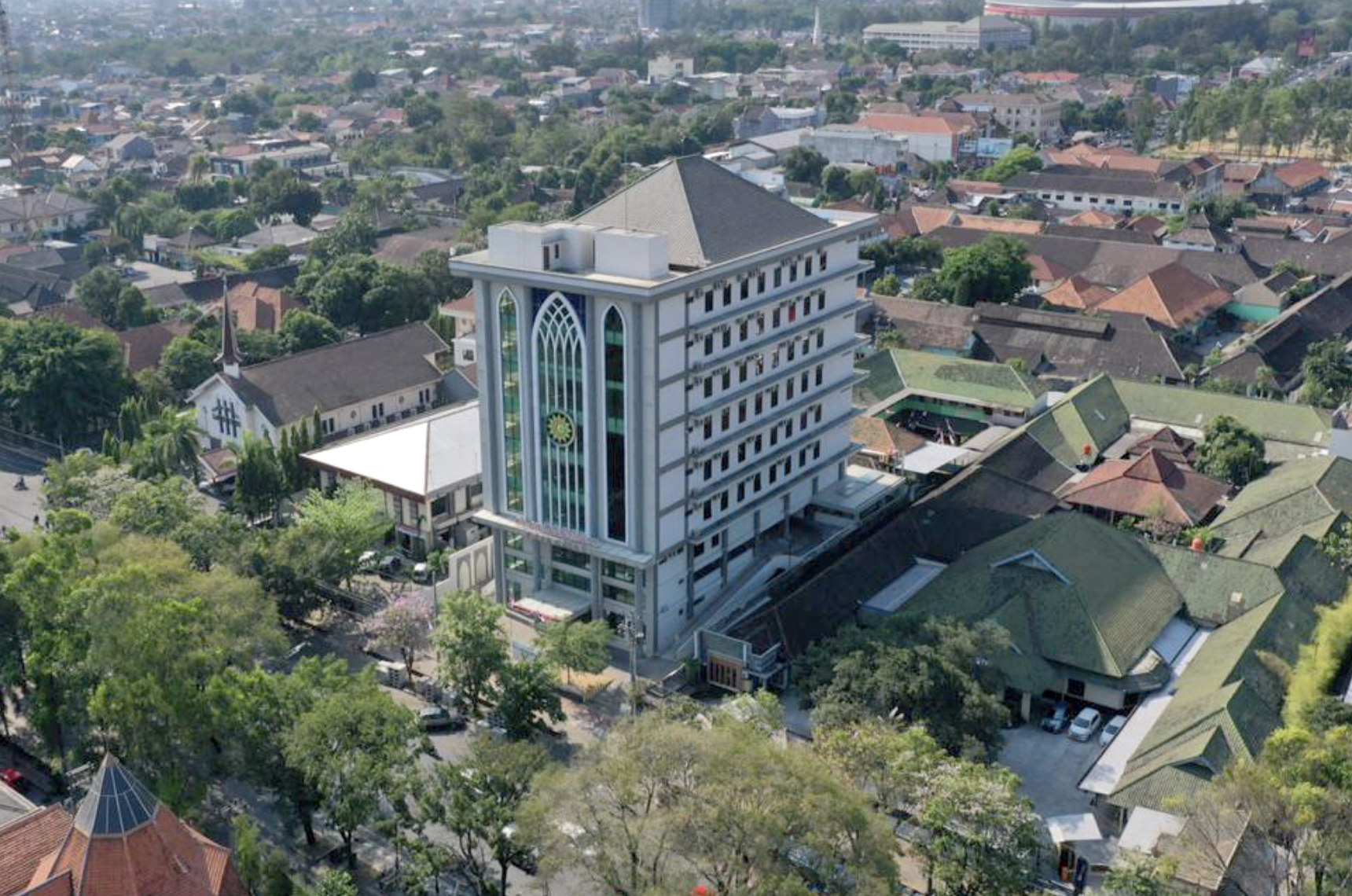
RSGM Soelastri operated by UMS

UMS operates the Soelastri Dental and Oral Hospital (RSGM Soelastri), located at Jalan Brigjen Slamet Riyadi No. 366, Surakarta. The hospital was built on a site of approximately 1,524 m². RSGM Soelastri serves as a professional training facility for the Faculty of Dentistry, as well as a healthcare service, referral, and research support center in the field of dental and oral health for the community. The hospital complies with the provisions of Law of the Republic of Indonesia No. 20 of 2013 and the Regulation of the Minister of Health of the Republic of Indonesia No. 1173 of 2004.

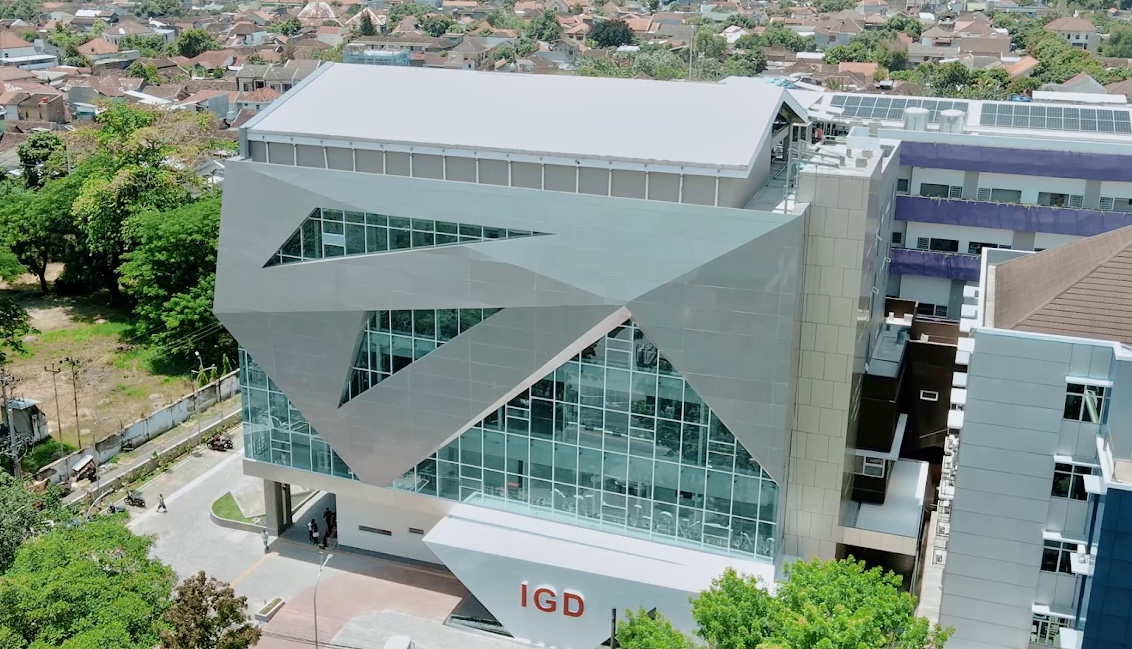
The RS UMS

UMS also operates A.R. Fachrudin Hospital (RS UMS), located at Jalan Adi Sucipto No. 167, Surakarta. The hospital was officially opened on 13 December 2025 and inaugurated by the Chairman of the Central Board of Muhammadiyah, Haedar Nashir, in the presence of the Mayor of Surakarta, Respati Ardi, accompanied by UMS Rector Harun Joko Prayitno. The hospital functions as a healthcare facility for the community as well as a supporting institution for the development of human resources in the health sector integrated with higher education, particularly for the people of Surakarta and surrounding areas.

== History ==
Muhammadiyah University of Surakarta (UMS) is an institution of higher education under Persyarikatan Muhammadiyah. UMS stands on the Decree of the Minister of Education and Culture (Decree No. 0330/O/1981. October 24, 1981) which changed its name from IKIP Muhammadiyah Surakarta.

UMS is institutionally derived from the Faculty of Teacher Training and Education (Guidance and Counseling) Jakarta Muhammadiyah University of Surakarta Branch, which was established in 1957. The founders included Mother Sudalmiyah Suhud Rais, Radjab Month Hadipurnomo, Muhammad Syafa'at Habib, Sulastri Gito Atmodjo, and KH Syahlan Rosyidi, among others.

On September 18, 1958, the new university was inaugurated by the mayor of Surakarta Municipality, Werdhisastro HM Salih. It had 51 students and seven employed lecturers. Capital assets at inception were derived from the FKIP Jakarta Muhammadiyah University of Surakarta Branch, located at Jalan Lieutenant Colonel Sudiarto No. 60 Surakarta.

The dean of the college was Abdullah Sigit, a professor at Gadjah Mada University, and the secretary Muhammad Syafa'at Habib. The majors offered have opened up education in general and include, Public Economics and Islamic Studies, Islamic Religious Education – the bachelor's degree, all of which have a registered status.

In 1963, the majors were given the status equal to a diploma awarded at public universities (comparable to the Bachelor level) under the decree of the Minister of Higher Education and Science Number 106/A in 1963.

In 1965, the Guidance and Counseling Branch of Muhammadiyah Surakarta received permission to independently establish two Higher Education institutions, namely the Institute of Teacher Training and Education (Teachers' Training College) Muhammadiyah Surakarta, under the coordination of the Ministry of Higher Education and Science and the Institute of Islamic Muhammadiyah (IAIM) under the coordination of the Ministry of Religious Affairs. IKIP Muhammadiyah Surakarta standing with the General Education majors (PU), Public Economics (EU) based on the Decree of the Minister of High Education and Science (No. 337/B-SWT/1965), and IAIM with majors MT / Islamic Religious Education and Programs Ushuluddin / Comparative Religion Religion bersadarkan Ministerial Decree number 21 of 1966.

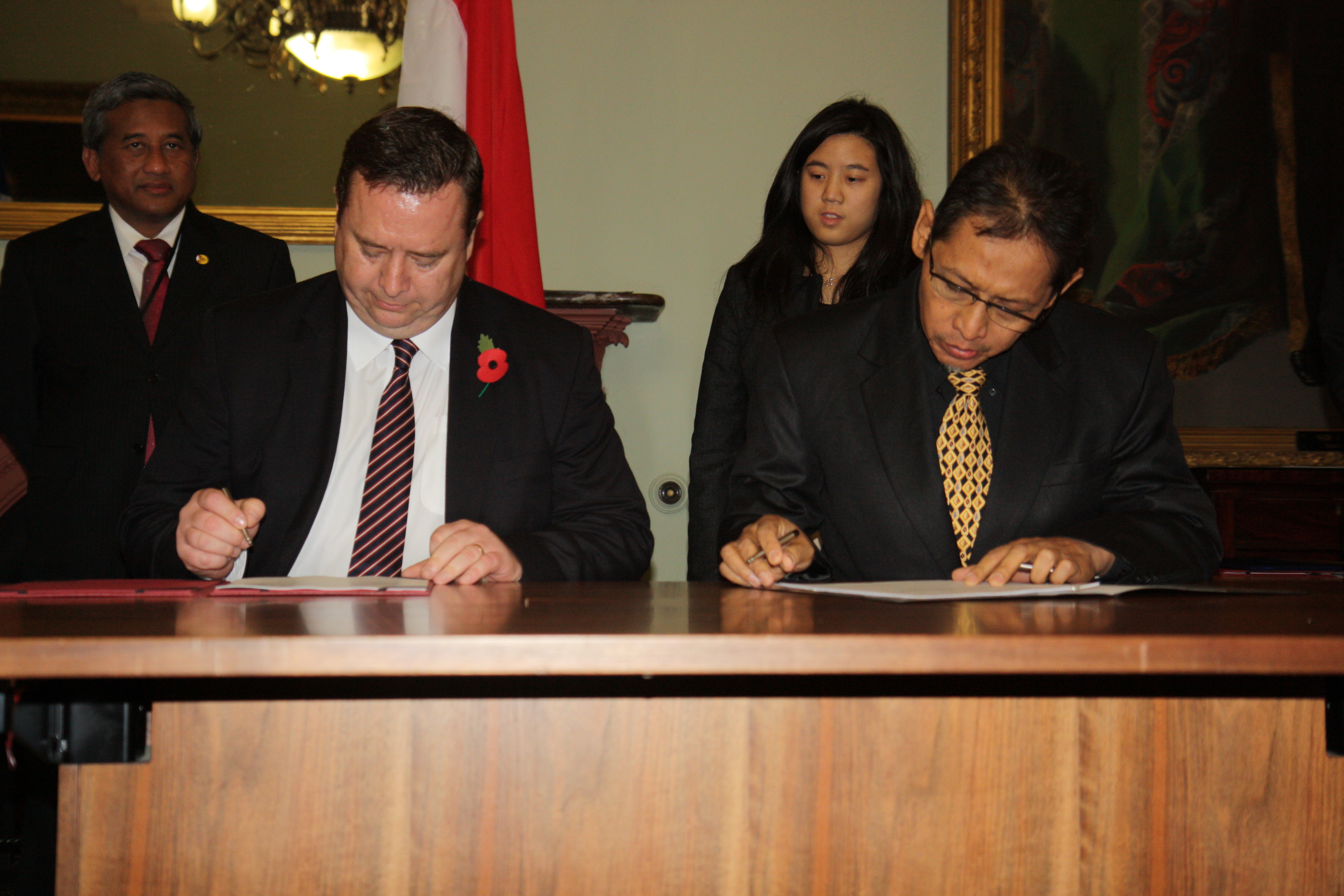
Mr. Jason Feehily, Head of Asia Business Centre, University of Nottingham, and Bambang Setiaji, Rector of Muhammadiyah University of Surakarta.

In 1967, Muhammadiyah Surakarta IKIP added a department of Civic Law (CH) with registered status as a parent and received permission from Muhammadiyah University of Central Java, consisting of Muhammadiyah IKIP Klaten, Magelang, Holy, Purwokerto, Kebumen, Wates, Waterford, Wonogiri, Sukoharjo, Karanganyar, Banjarnegara, Prambanan, Purbalingga, Wonosari, and Sragen. Once developed, the support these branches received was withdrawn as they had matured and could be run as independent colleges, such as Muhammadiyah Purwokerto Teachers' Training College, Teachers' Training College and Teachers' Training College Purworejo Muhammadiyah Muhammadiyah Magelang.

In 1979, H. Mohamd Djazman, then director of Muhammadiyah Surakarta IKIP, initiated the founding of Muhammadiyah University of Surakarta Muhammadiyah Surakarta by combining the Teachers' Training College and IAIM Surakarta. The initiative was later realized with a decree from the Minister of Education and Culture No 0330/O/1981 about the changing status of Muhammadiyah IKIP of Surakarta became Muhammadiyah University of Surakarta.

As a strengthening of institutions, UMS manages several faculties, namely Guidance and Counseling, the Faculty of Economics, the Faculty of Law, the Faculty of Engineering, and the Faculty of Religion of Islam (FAI). In 1983–1984, UMS opened the Faculty of Psychology and the Faculty of Geography.

In line with the demands and development of society, some faculties are developed by opening new departments such as the Faculty of Economics, Department of Economics of Development Studies, Faculty of Engineering with the Department of Architecture, Electrical, Chemical Engineering, and Industrial Engineering. In 1993–1994 UMS opened the Associate Expert Health Education program (D3) with the Department of Nursing, Physiotherapy, Nutrition, and Environmental Health. Year 1995–1996 opened the Graduate Program in the Masters program in Islamic Studies (MSI). Subsequently, the Faculty of Pharmacy and Master in Management (MM) was opened in 1999 and the Master of Legal Studies, Civil Engineering, and Management Education were opened in 2001. The Faculty of Health Sciences, majoring in Public Health, Nursing, Physiotherapy was opened in 2003–2004 S1 and D4, and following the Doctor of Education courses were opened in the academic year 2004–2005. In the development of four recent studies the program is integrated with the program D-3 with the name of the Faculty of Health Medicine. In 2005, UMS received permission to open the program to meet another master's degree in Psychology and Language Assessment Masters program in 2006. In 2006, the Teacher Training and Education Program opened a new department D2 Teacher Education Kindergarten (PGTK). In 2006 also opened the Faculty of Communications and Information Technology with a department of Communication Studies, followed by the opening of Informatics Engineering (Software) in 2007. In 2007 FKIP also opened a new department, namely the Primary School Teacher Education (PGSD). Year 2007 also marked with UMS step toward world-class university that is with the opening of the International program UMS cooperation with Kingston University in England to study automotive engineering program and UMS co-operation with University Kebangsaan Malaysia for a course of Business Administration and Medical Law. Until now, UMS manages 42 (forty two) courses of study and 2 (two) international programs. In addition, UMS also provides professional education for pharmacists, psychologists, lawyers, nurses, and teachers. The foundation for world-class university to become stronger with the inclusion of UMS in the 50 Promising Indonesian Universities. The number of active UMS students recorded in the Higher Education Database (PDDIKTI) currently reaches 47,440 in 2025.Lonjakan Pendaftar di UMS Capai 20.200: Prodi Baru dan Jalur UTBK Dorong Antusiasme Camaba – Berita UMS

== Faculties ==
The university has 12 faculties:

- Faculty of Communication and Information
- Faculty of Economics
- Faculty of Engineering
- Faculty of Geography
- Faculty of Health Sciences
- Faculty of Islamic Religion
- Faculty of Law
- Faculty of Medicine
- Faculty of Pharmacy
- Faculty of Psychology
- Faculty of Teacher Training and Education
- Faculty of Dentistry

== Undergraduate Programs (Bachelor’s Degree) ==
=== Faculty of Teacher Training and Education (FKIP) ===
- Accounting Education
- Civic Education
- Indonesian Language and Literature Education
- English Language Education
- Mathematics Education
- Biology Education
- Primary School Teacher Education (PGSD)
- Early Childhood Education (PAUD)
- Geography Education
- Informatics Engineering Education
- Sports Education

=== Faculty of Economics and Business (FEB) ===
- Management
- Accounting
- Development Economics

=== Faculty of Law (FH) ===
- Law

=== Faculty of Engineering (FT) ===
- Mechanical Engineering
- Civil Engineering
- Electrical Engineering
- Architecture
- Chemical Engineering
- Industrial Engineering

=== Faculty of Pharmacy (FF) ===
- Pharmacy

=== Faculty of Psychology (FP) ===
- Psychology

=== Faculty of Geography (FG) ===
- Geography

=== Faculty of Islamic Studies (FAI) ===
- Islamic Religious Education
- Sharia Economic Law
- Qur’anic Studies and Exegesis

=== Faculty of Health Sciences (FIK) ===
- Nursing
- Nutrition Science
- Public Health
- Physiotherapy

=== Faculty of Medicine (FK) ===
- Medicine

=== Faculty of Dentistry (FKG) ===
- Dentistry

=== Faculty of Communication and Informatics (FKI) ===
- Communication Science
- Informatics Engineering
- Information Systems

== Master program ==
- Master of Civil Engineering
- Master of Islamic Studies
- Master of Languages and Literature Review
- Master of Management
- Master of Management Education
- Master of Psychology
- Master of Islamic Religious Education
- Master of Sharia Economic Law
- Master of Law
- Master of Accounting
- Master of Educational Administration
- Master of Indonesian Language Education
- Master of English Language Education
- Master of Primary Education
- Master of Pharmacy
- Master of Mechanical Engineering
- Master of Chemical Engineering
- Master of Informatics (or: Master of Computer Science, depending on program equivalence)
- Master of Hospital Administration
- Master of Mathematics Education
- Master of Nursing

== Doctoral program ==
- Doctoral Program Legal Studies
- Doctoral Program in Law
- Doctoral Program in Education
- Doctoral Program in Islamic Religious Education
- Doctoral Program in Pharmacy
- Doctoral Program in Psychology
- Doctoral Program in Mechanical Engineering

== International programs ==
- Communication Sciences
- Informatics Engineering
- Management
- Chemical Engineering
- Civil Engineering
- Electrical Engineering
- Mechanical Engineering
- Nursing
- Islamic Education
- Law

== See also ==
- List of Islamic educational institutions
