= Association of University Presses =

Organization of university presses

- Abbreviation: AUPresses
- Founded: 1937; 89 years ago
- Type: 501(c)(3)
- Tax ID no.: 13-2506620 (EIN)
- Key people: Anthony Cond (President)
- Revenue: ▲US$1.64 million (2023)
- Expenses: ▲US$1.76 million (2023)
- Website: aupresses.org
- Formerly called: Association of American University Presses (AAUP)

The Association of University Presses (AUPresses) is an association of nonprofit, mostly, but not exclusively, North American university presses. It is based in New York City. Until December 2017, it was known as the Association of American University Presses (AAUP).

In 2021, AUPresses became an affiliate member of the American Council of Learned Societies. AUPresses is also an affiliate member of the International Publishers Association.

== History ==
The Association of University Presses was officially established in 1937. However, two dozen of the original members of the AAUP regularly met, unofficially, as early as 1920. The publishers met to discuss problems facing university presses until the group formally began meeting daily. The group believed that cooperative initiatives would benefit member institutions and subsequent presses. In 1928, thirteen university presses produced a cooperative catalog of sixty-five titles. Soon after, the group was placing cooperative ads with The New York Times, publishing sales catalogs, and producing the first educational directory, a specialized direct-mailing list of American academics and librarians.

The 1932 Cheney Report encouraged joint activities among publishers facing economic difficulties brought on by the Great Depression and inspired a memo from Donald Bean, the group's secretary and director of the University of Chicago Press. Bean proposed for the group to formally incorporate. After a 1936 announcement of Farrar & Rheinhardt's plans to establish the United University Presses Inc. wholesaler (renamed, at the urging of the group, to "University Books Inc."), the group began formally under a new banner. In February 1937, the first officers of the Association of University Presses were elected. The first annual meeting was held in Chicago in 1946. Membership continued to grow steadily, and the responding swell of activity led to the establishment of a central office in 1959. The Association was previously operated by volunteers. In 1964 the association founded a business subsidiary, American University Press Services, which supported additional AAUP services for the next two decades.

From 1920 to 1970, member institutions in the United States grew at a rate of about one per year. From 1970 to 1974, that rate doubled, with more than ten presses founded. The period of growth was honored by President Jimmy Carter in the summer of 1978. President Carter proclaimed the first University Press Week.

In June 2017, members of the association voted to change its name from the "Association of American University Presses" (AAUP) to the "Association of University Presses" (AUPresses). The change was made on 21 December 2017, at which time there were 143 member presses. A new visual identity and logo were introduced at the time, the designers' brief being to show the AUPresses as "open and engaging, representing a forward-thinking and mission-driven publishing community that holds to — and stands for — high standards of scholarship and professionalism."

The Association of University Presses is a signatory of the SDG Publishers Compact, and has taken steps to support the achievement of the Sustainable Development Goals (SDGs) in the publishing industry.

== See also ==
- List of university presses
