= University press =

Publisher associated with a university

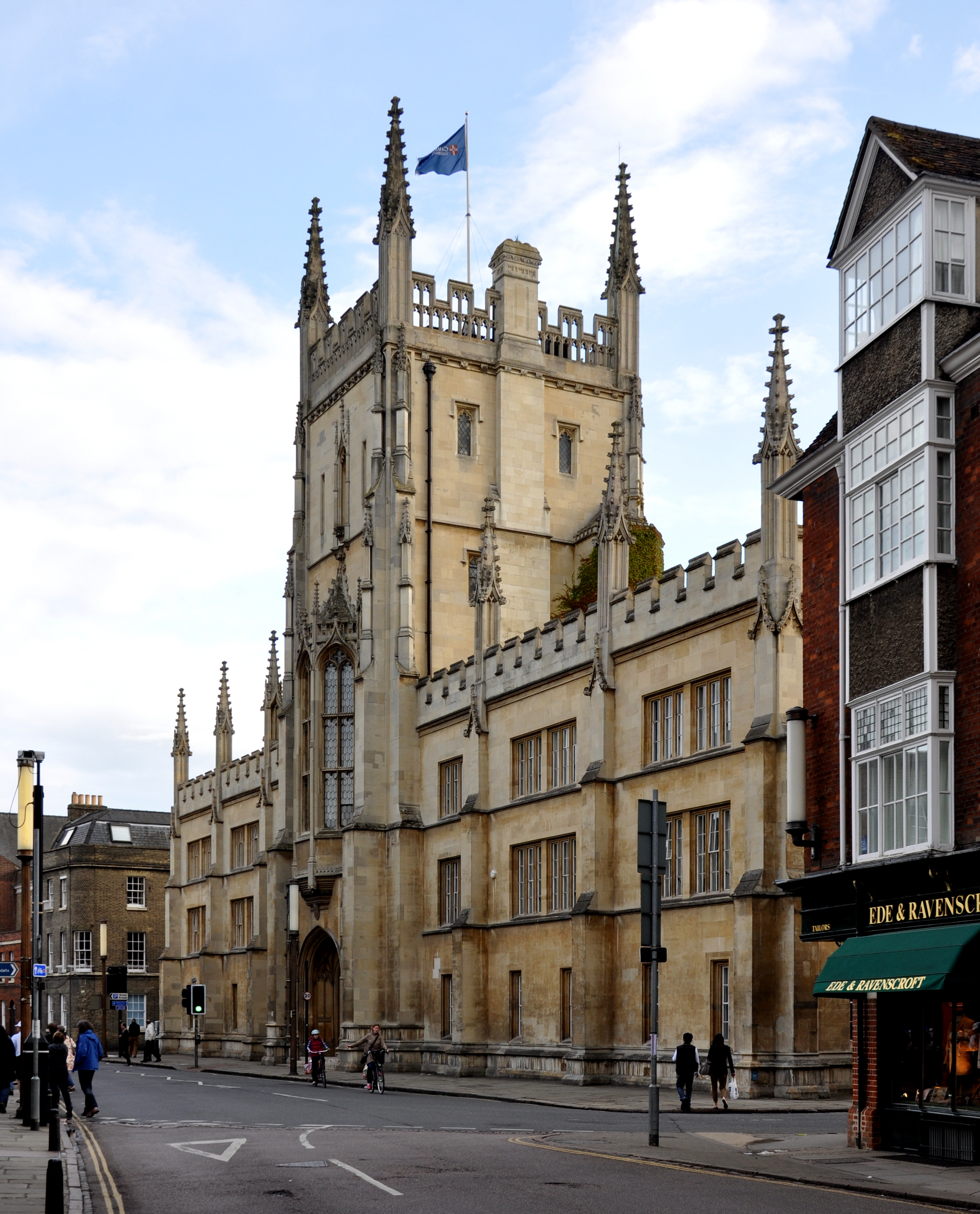
The Pitt Building at the University of Cambridge in Cambridge, England was built in 1833 and is home of Cambridge University Press, the world's oldest university press.

A university press is an academic publishing house specializing in monographs and scholarly journals. They are often an integral component of a large research university. They publish work that has been reviewed by scholars in the field. They produce mainly academic works but also often have trade books for a lay audience. These trade books also get peer reviewed. Many but not all university presses are nonprofit organizations, including the 160 members of the Association of University Presses.

Because scholarly books are mostly unprofitable, university presses may also publish textbooks and reference works, which tend to have larger audiences and sell more copies. Most university presses operate at a loss and are subsidized by their owners; others are required to break even. Demand has fallen as library budgets are cut and the online sales of used books undercut the new book market. Many presses are experimenting with electronic publishing.

== History ==
Cambridge University Press and Oxford University Press are the two oldest and largest university presses in the world. They have scores of branches around the world, especially throughout the Commonwealth of Nations.

In the United States, colonial colleges required printers to publish university catalogs, ceremonial materials, and a limited number of scholarly publications. Following the 17th-century work of Harvard College printer Samuel Green, William Hilliard of Cambridge, Massachusetts, began publishing materials under the name "University Press" in 1802. Modern university presses emerged in the United States in the late 19th century. Cornell University started one in 1869 but had to close it down, only restarting operations in 1930; Johns Hopkins University Press has been in continuous operation since 1878. (Note: First known as the University Publication Agency, it was renamed the Johns Hopkins Press in 1891.) The University of Pennsylvania Press (1890), University of Chicago Press (1891), Stanford University Press (1892), Columbia University Press (1893), University of California Press (1893), and Northwestern University Press (1893) followed.

The biggest growth came after 1945 as higher education expanded rapidly. There was a leveling off after 1970.

=== Asia ===
By the time of independence in 1947, India had a well-established system of universities, and several leading ones developed a university press. The main areas of activity include monographs by professors, research papers and theses, and textbooks for undergraduate use. However, the basic problem faced by scholarly publishers in India is the use of multiple languages, which splintered and reduced the base of potential sales.

=== Africa ===
Oxford University Press opened a South African office in 1915 to distribute its books in the region. The first South African university press was established in 1922 at Witwatersrand University. Several other South African universities established presses during the 20th century and, as of 2015, four were actively publishing. As new universities opened in Africa after 1960, some developed a press based on the European model. In Nigeria for example, scholarly presses have played a central role in shaping and encouraging intellectual efforts and gaining international attention for scholarly production. However, the established European presses, especially Oxford University Press, have dominated the market, allowing a narrow niche for new local presses such as Ibadan University Press, now University Press Plc.

=== Europe ===
In England, Cambridge University Press traces its founding to 1534, when King Henry VIII granted the university letters patent, giving it the right to print its own books, and its active publishing program to 1584. Oxford University began publishing books the following year in 1585 and acquired a charter in 1632.

In Scotland Archie Turnbull (1923-2003) served as the long-time director of the Edinburgh University Press, 1952-87. The British university presses had strong expansion in the 1950s and 1960s. The Edinburgh University Press became the leading Scottish academic publisher. It was especially famous for publishing major books on the history and literature of Scotland, and by enlisting others in Scotland.

=== Ibero-American ===
Ibero-American university publishing accounts for 9% of all ISBN-registered books on the subcontinent. University presses play a vital role in transferring knowledge from universities to society through the publication of academic books, such as scientific, technical, and educational texts.

=== Oceania ===
In Australia, the University of Melbourne was the first to establish its own press: Melbourne University Press, set up to sell books and stationery in 1922, began publishing academic monographs soon after and is the second-oldest publishing house in Australia. Other Australian universities followed suit in following decades, including the University of Western Australia Press (1935), University of Queensland Press (1948) and Sydney University Press (1962). In the later part of the 20th century, some of these presses closed down or were taken over by larger international presses. Some survived and built strong reputations for publishing literature, poetry and serious non-fiction. In the 21st century several Australian universities have revived their presses or established new ones. Their business models and publishing approaches vary considerably. Some publish chiefly for general readers while others publish only scholarly books. Several have experimented with Open Access publishing and/or electronic-only publishing. Some supplement their publishing income by offering distribution services or operating bookshops. In January 2019 Melbourne University Press announced a plan to focus increasingly on scholarly books rather than the commercial successes it had become known for, prompting a public debate about the role of university presses.In New Zealand, several universities operate scholarly presses. Auckland University Press has been operating since 1966 and Victoria University Press since the 1970s.

=== North America ===
==== The Association of Presses (AUP) ====
In 2023, the Association of University Presses (AUP) has over 150 member presses. Growth has been sporadic, with 14 presses established in the 1940s, 11 in the 1950s; and 19 in the 1960s. Since 1970, 16 universities have opened presses and several have closed. Today, the largest university press in the United States is the University of Chicago Press. University presses tend to develop specialized areas of expertise, such as regional studies. For instance, Yale University Press publishes many art books, the Chicago, Duke, and Indiana University Presses publish many academic journals, the University of Illinois Press specializes in labor history, MIT Press publishes linguistics and architecture titles, Northwestern University Press publishes in continental philosophy, poetry, and the performing arts, and the Catholic University of America Press publishes works that deal with Catholic theology, philosophy, and church history.

==== Chicago Distribution Center ====
The Distribution Services Division provides the University of Chicago Press's warehousing, customer service, and related services. The Chicago Distribution Center (CDC) began providing distribution services in 1991, when the University of Tennessee Press became its first client. Currently the CDC serves nearly 100 publishers including Stanford University Press, University of Minnesota Press, University of Iowa Press, Temple University Press, Northwestern University Press, and many others. Since 2001, with development funding from the Mellon Foundation, the Chicago Digital Distribution Center (CDDC) has been offering digital printing services and the BiblioVault digital repository services to book publishers. In 2009, the CDC enabled the sales of electronic books directly to individuals and provided digital delivery services for the University of Michigan Press among others. The Chicago Distribution Center has also partnered with an additional 15 presses including the University of Missouri Press, West Virginia University Press, and publications of the Getty Foundation.

== Recent developments ==
=== Financial pressures ===
Financially, university presses have come under growing pressure. Only a few presses, such as Oxford, Harvard, Princeton, and Yale have endowments; the others depend upon sales, fundraising, and subventions (subsidies) from their sponsoring institutions. Subsidies vary but typically range from $150,000 to $500,000. Because the subsidies are often not indexed to inflation, university press operating budgets can face a functional squeeze as inflation chips away at the value of the subsidy. Operating models vary, but host universities generally cover fixed costs like labor and fixed assets, while looking to the press to cover variable costs from the sale of books and other revenue. Sales of academic books have been declining, however, especially as University libraries cut back their purchases. At Princeton University Press in the 1960s, a typical hardcover monograph would sell 1,660 copies in the five years after publication. By 1984, that average had declined to 1,003 and in after 2000 typical sales of monographs for all presses are below 500. University libraries are under heavy pressure to purchase very expensive subscriptions to commercial science journals, even as their overall budgets are static. By 1997 scientific journals were thirty times more expensive than they were in 1970.

In May 2012, the University of Missouri System announced that it would close the University of Missouri Press so that it might focus more efficiently on "strategic priorities." Friends of the press from around the country rallied to its support, arguing that by publishing over 2,000 scholarly books the press made a major contribution to scholarship. A few months later the university reversed its decision.

In 2014, Peter Berkery, the executive director of the Association of University Presses stated:

University presses are experiencing new, acute and, in some ways, existential pressures, largely from changes occurring in the academy and the technology juggernaut. Random House can see the technology threat and they can throw some substantial resources at it. The press at a small land-grant university doesn't have the same ability to respond.

=== New university presses ===
In the late 2010s, a number of universities began launching initiatives, often under the aegis of their libraries, to "support the creation, dissemination, and curation of scholarly, creative, and/or educational works" in a way that emulated the approach of traditional university presses while also taking into account the changing landscape of scholarly publishing. These initiatives have collectively been dubbed "new university presses", which the "Open-Access Toolkit", published by the OAPEN Foundation, defines as follows:

These are university presses established since the 1990s, often explicitly to publish open access books. In many other respects, they are run like a university press. However, as with library publishing ... NUPs are often library-led, albeit with an academic-led steering group or editorial board.

Examples of NUPs include ANU Press (Australia), Amherst College Press (USA), University of Michigan Press (USA), UCL Press (UK), and the University of Huddersfield Press (UK).

== See also ==
- Library publishing
- List of university presses
