= Bibliography of Ontario =

The Flag of Ontario

The location of the province of Ontario in Canada.

This is a bibliography of works on Ontario.

== General ==
- Bishop, Olga B., et s\al. eds. Bibliography of Ontario History 1867-1967 (2 vols. University of Toronto Press, 1980).
- The Dictionary of Canadian Biography (1966–2006): thousands of scholarly biographies of notables who died by 1930
- Canadian Encyclopedia (2008): reliable detailed encyclopedia, online free
- Celebrating One Thousand Years of Ontario's History: Proceedings of the Celebrating One Thousand Years of Ontario's History Symposium, April 14, 15, and 16, 2000. Ontario Historical Society, 2000. 343 pp.
- Armstrong, Frederick H. (1985). Handbook of Upper Canadian Chronology. Dundurn Press. ISBN 0-919670-92-X.
- Baskerville, Peter A. Sites of Power: A Concise History of Ontario. Oxford University Press, 2005. 296 pp. (first edition was Ontario: Image, Identity and Power, 2002). online review
- Beaulieu, Michel S. and Chris Southcott. North of Superior: An Illustrated History of Northwestern Ontario. Toronto: James Lorimer and Company, 2010. ISBN 9781552774694
- Carter, Floreen Ellen (1984). Place Names of Ontario. Phelps. ISBN 0920298397.
- Chambers, Lori, and Edgar-Andre Montigny, eds. Ontario Since Confederation: A Reader (2000): articles by scholars
- Hall, Roger; Westfall, William; and MacDowell, Laurel Sefton, eds. Patterns of the Past: Interpreting Ontario's History. Dundurn Press, 1988. 406 pp.
- Mays, John Bentley. Arrivals: Stories from the History of Ontario. Penguin Books Canada, 2002. 418 pp.
- Ruth Arndt (Spence). "Prohibition in Canada: A Memorial to Francis Stephens Spence. Ed. F. S. Spence". Ontario Branch of the Dominion Alliance for the Total Suppression of the Liquor Traffic (1919), 105–138, 381–400. Examines the temperance movement and political platforms towards prohibition.
- Malcolm Bird. Bird, Malcolm G. "Alberta's and Ontario's Liquor Boards: Why such Divergent Outcomes?" Canadian Public Administration 53.4 (2010): 509-530. A case study between Ontario and Alberta regarding privatization of liquor.
- McClung, Helen A. (April 1947). "Department of Public Records and Archives of Ontario". The American Archivist. 10 (2). Society of American Archivists: 184–186. doi:10.17723/aarc.10.2.nt44828n87550330. JSTOR 40288563.
- Morris Fish. "The Effect of Alcohol on the Canadian Constitution ...Seriously." McGill Law Journal. 57.1 09; 2011: 189+. The author focuses on prohibition as a vital event that lead courts to be modernized.
- Gerald Hallowell. Prohibition in Ontario, 1919–1923. Love Printing Service, 1972: 3–18, 150–152. Mainly focuses on the election platforms of prohibition and was critical of the E.C Drury government.
- Murray Johnston. E.C. Drury: Agrarian Idealist. University of Toronto Press, 1986: 1–4, 158–160, 196, 200–202. A biography of E.C Drury Premier of Ontario 1919–1923.
- Dan Malleck. Try to Control Yourself: The Regulation of Public Drinking in Post-Prohibition Ontario, 1927–44. UBC Press, 2012: xv–xvi, 240–245. A book that analyzes the creation of the Liquor Control Board of Ontario.
- Dan Malleck. "An Innovation from Across the Line: The American Drinker and Liquor Regulation in Two Ontario Border Communities, 1927–1944." Journal of Canadian Studies 41.1 (2007): 151–171. End of Prohibition in Ontario created a challenge for the relationship between the United States and Canada.
- Peter Nesbitt. G. Howard Ferguson: Ontario Tory. University of Toronto Press, 1977, 138–139, 158–60, 277–279. A biography of G. Howard Ferguson Premier of Ontario 1923–1930.
- Christina Blizzard. Right Turn: How the Tories Took Ontario Dundurn Press, 1995.
- Monica Gattinger and Diane St Pierre. "The 'Neoliberal Turn' in Provincial Cultural Policy and Administration in Québec and Ontario: The Emergence of'Quasi-Neoliberal' Approaches." Canadian Journal of Communication. 35: 2 (June 29, 2010)
- Roger Keil. "'Common–Sense' Neoliberalism: Progressive Conservative Urbanism in Toronto, Canada." Antipode. 34: 3 (2002): 578–601.
- Sharon Anne Jaeger. From Control to Customer Service: Government Control of Liquor in Ontario, 1927–1972. ProQuest Dissertations and Theses, 2000. Examination of post-Prohibition alcohol policy in Ontario, and the inconsistent and often contradictory roles of the government's two alcohol-related organs, the Liquor Control Board of Ontario (LCBO) and the Liquor License Board of Ontario (LLBO). Explores impact of social movements and popular opinion upon legislative decision-making, as well as industry lobbying and broader social context. Argues that Ontario's incrementalist approach to policy-making was often challenged by the need for rapid change in alcohol policy, and examines the government's attempts to construct hasty compromises. Posits that the continued existence of the LCBO past the time when it was a large contributor to net general revenue indicates not only its importance as a patronage tool and means to appease powerful alcohol producers, but also represents a reflection of government's enduring belief that the restriction of market forces is permissible if it protects society.
- Lukin Robinson. "The Ontario Election and After." Monthly Review 47.9 (1996): 19. An analysis, from the perspective of a socialist, of the 1995 general election in Ontario and its impact on the economy and government. Focuses on the NDP's failings as an effective government leading to its downfall and the Conservative's victory. Critical of the approach to which the NDP and Liberals handled the election, and the Conservatives sweeping changes to social programs in pursuit of reducing provincial deficit.
- Maeve Quaid. Workfare: Why Good Social Policy Ideas Go Bad. University of Toronto Press, 2002. An historical and comparative study of workfare as a social policy idea in the 1980s and 1990s.
- Sid Noel. Essays on Governing Ontario: Revolution at Queen's Park. James Lorimer & Company, 1997. A collection of essays and empirical studies examining the Ontario election in 1995. Discusses a variety of factors contributing to the Conservative victory including TV advertising campaigns, electoral behaviour, a change in Ontario's political culture, and economic and political history. Notes the appeal of fiscal accountability and platforms that cover a variety of areas of policy.
- Bob Hebdon and Peter Warrian. "Coercive Bargaining: Public Sector Restructuring Under the Ontario Social Contract, 1993–1996." Industrial and Labor Relations Review 52.2 (1999): 196–212. An empirical study of the 1993 NDP government's Social Contract Act mandating spending reductions. Focuses on the approach to restructuring that the Social Contract takes paying particular attention to unionization and collective bargaining and cooperativeness between labour and management. Concludes by arguing that optimal restructuring outcomes were achieved when the collective concerns of workers were heard. Further states that majority of local unions and managers were able to find compromise under the Social Contract Act which was not the case when compared to Conservative restructuring causing prolonged strikes.
- Robert Drummond. "The Provincial Perspectives: Ontario." Canadian Annual Review of Politics and Public Affairs, 1995. Edited by David Leyton-Brown. Toronto: University of Toronto Press, 2002. An overview of the 1995 general election in Ontario and record of the Speech from the Throne as well as the first session of the 36th Ontario provincial parliament. Focuses on establishing the facts rather than an in depth analysis of the election; determines that the major issues of the election were welfare, tax and spending cuts, and employment equity. Notes that Conservative victory due to a platform with promises (unlike the NDP), no half measures (unlike the Liberals), the poor performance of the NDP incumbent government, a shrewd advertisement campaign, votes from Reform supporters, and NDP and Liberals attacking one another rather than the Conservatives. Concludes with a record of the new government quickly fulfilling its campaign promises allowing it continued major public support and the introduction of an omnibus bill proposing amendments to approximately 40 statutes. Such amendments included allowing the government to close hospitals, direct doctors to practice in certain areas, and facilitate the merger of municipal governments.

== Cartography ==
- Winearls, Joan (1973). "Towards a Bibliography of 18th & 19th Century Maps of Ontario". Papers of the Bibliographical Society of Canada. 12 (1). doi:10.33137/pbsc.v12i1.16910.
- Winearls, Joan (1993). "The Printing and Publishing of Maps in Ontario Before Confederation". Papers of the Bibliographical Society of Canada. 31 (1). doi:10.33137/pbsc.v31i1.17872.

== Geography and environment ==
- Berton, Pierre (1992). Niagara: A History of the Falls.
- Brown, Ron,Top 100 Unusual Things to See in Ontario (2007) excerpt and text search
- Carr, Geneviève M.; Bod, Sarah A. E.; Duthie, Hamish C.; Taylor, William D. (June 2003). "Macrophyte biomass and water quality in Ontario rivers". Journal of the North American Benthological Society. 22 (2). University of Chicago Press: 182–193. doi:10.2307/1467991. JSTOR 1467991.
- Corkal, Vanessa; Gass, Philip (1 July 2019). The (Public) Cost of Pollution: Ontario's fossil fuel subsidies (Report). International Institute for Sustainable Development. JSTOR resrep21982.
- Cruickshank, Tom; de Visser, John (2000). Old Ontario Houses: Traditions in Local Architecture. Firefly Books. ISBN 978-1552094990.
- Fraser, David; Thomas, Evan R. (Autumn 1982). "Moose-Vehicle Accidents in Ontario: Relation to Highway Salt". Wildlife Society Bulletin. 10 (3). Wiley: 261–265. JSTOR 3781015.
- Freeman, Neil B. The Politics of Power: Ontario Hydro and its Government, 1906–1995 (1996)
- Goodwin, Clive E. (1995). A Bird-Finding Guide to Ontario. University of Toronto Press. doi:10.3138/9781442671423. ISBN 978-1-4426-7142-3.
- Gunson, Kari E.; Schueler, Frederick W. (December 2012). "Effective Placement of Road Mitigation Using Lessons Learned from Turtle Crossing Signs in Ontario". Ecological Restoration. 30 (4). University of Wisconsin Press: 329–334. Bibcode:2012EcoRe..30..329G. doi:10.3368/er.30.4.329. JSTOR 43441506.
- MacPherson, Allen. Ontario Provincial Parks Trail Guide (2005) briefly describes the 325 interpretive and hiking trails found in 86 operating Ontario Provincial Parks excerpt and text search
- McRobert, David; Tennent-Riddell, Julian; Walker, Chad (2016). "Ontario's Green Economy and Green Energy Act: Why a Well-Intentioned Law is Mired in Controversy and Opposed by Rural Communities". Renewable Energy Law and Policy Review. 7 (2). Claeys & Casteels Law Publishing: 91–112. doi:10.4337/relp.2016.02.01. hdl:10871/121582. JSTOR 26256490.
- Nelles, H. V. The Politics of Development: Forests Mines & Hydro-Electric Power in Ontario, 1849–1941 (2005)
- O'Connor, Ryan. The First Green Wave: Pollution Probe and the Origins of Environmental Activism in Ontario. (2015)
- Soper, J. Dewey (November 1923). "The Mammals of Wellington and Waterloo Counties, Ontario". Journal of Mammalogy. 4 (4). American Society of Mammalogists: 244–252. doi:10.2307/1373706. JSTOR 1373706.
- Winfield, Mark S. Blue-Green Province: The Environment and the Political Economy of Ontario (University of British Columbia Press, 2012) 296 pages; environmental policies since 1945

== Indigenous peoples ==
- Brownlie, Robin (2003). A Fatherly Eye: Indian Agents, Government Power, and Aboriginal Resistance in Ontario, 1918–1939. University of Toronto Press. ISBN 978-0-19-541784-5.
- Garrad, Charles (2014). Pilon, Jean-Luc; Fox, William (eds.). Petun to Wyandot: The Ontario Petun from the Sixteenth Century. Mercury Series. University of Ottawa Press. ISBN 978-0-7766-2151-7. JSTOR j.ctt6wr8db.
- Hedican, Edward J. (2017). The First Nations of Ontario: Social and Historical Transitions. Canadian Scholars. ISBN 9781773380124.
- Lawson, James (2018). "Colonialism, Indigenous Struggles, and the Ontario State". In Albo, Greg; Evans, Bryan M. (eds.). Divided Province: Ontario Politics in the Age of Neoliberalism. pp. 423–460. doi:10.2307/j.ctvbj7g4v. ISBN 978-0-7735-5567-9.
- Madahbee, Dawn (2013). "First Nations Inclusion: A Key Requirement to Building the Northern Ontario Economy". In Conteh, Charles; Segsworth, Bob (eds.). Governance in Northern Ontario: Economic Development and Policy Making. University of Toronto Press. pp. 76–93. ISBN 978-1-4426-6285-8. JSTOR 10.3138/j.ctt5hjvwq.
- Rogers, Edward S.; Smith, Donald B. (1994). Aboriginal Ontario: Historical Perspectives on the First Nations. Dundurn Press. ISBN 978-1-55002-230-8.
- Schmalz, Peter S. (1991). The Ojibwa of Southern Ontario. University of Toronto Press. ISBN 978-0-8020-6778-4.
- Spence, Michael W.; Wilson, Jim (2015). "The Lafarge Burial: An Early Expression of Intercommunity Conflict in Southwestern Ontario". Canadian Journal of Archaeology. 39 (1). Canadian Archaeological Association: 123–137. JSTOR 43967382.
- Trigger, Bruce G. (1987). The Children of Aataentsic: A History of the Huron People to 1660. McGill–Queen's University Press. ISBN 978-0-7735-0627-5.
- Warrick, Gary (December 2000). "The Precontact Iroquoian Occupation of Southern Ontario". Journal of World Prehistory. 14 (4). Springer: 415–466. Bibcode:2000JWPre..14..415W. doi:10.1023/A:1011137725917. JSTOR 25801165.

== Economy ==
- Bonsor, N. C. (1977). Transportation Rates and Economic Development in Northern Ontario. Heritage. University of Toronto Press. ISBN 978-1-4426-3223-3. JSTOR 10.3138/j.ctt15jvx01.
- Boothman, Barry E. C. (2020). Corporate Cataclysm: Abitibi Power & Paper and the Collapse of the Newsprint Industry, 1912–1946. University of Toronto Press. ISBN 978-1-4875-3231-4. JSTOR 10.3138/j.ctv179h1kz.
- Clarke, John (2001). Land, Power, and Economics on the Frontier of Upper Canada. McGill–Queen's University Press. ISBN 978-0-7735-6850-1. JSTOR j.ctt81cz5.
- Cohen, Marjorie Griffin (1988). Women's Work, Markets, and Economic Development in Nineteenth-Century Ontario. Heritage Series. University of Toronto Press. ISBN 0-8020-2651-6.
- Conteh, Charles; Segsworth, Bob, eds. (2013). Governance in Northern Ontario: Economic Development and Policy Making. University of Toronto Press. ISBN 978-1-4426-6285-8. JSTOR 10.3138/j.ctt5hjvwq.
- Drummond, Ian M. (1987). Progress Without Planning: The Economic History of Ontario from Confederation to the Second World War. Heritage Series. University of Toronto Press. ISBN 978-1-4426-5395-5. JSTOR 10.3138/j.ctt1h1ht6s.
- Innis, Harold A. (2017). "An Introduction to the Economic History of Ontario from Outpost to Empire". In Innis, Mary Q. (ed.). Essays in Canadian Economic History. University of Toronto Press. pp. 108–122. ISBN 978-1-4875-1259-0. JSTOR 10.3138/j.ctv1005d14.
- Johnson, David R.; Nicholas, Joseline (March 2019). "Light Rail Transit and Property Values in Kitchener–Waterloo". Canadian Public Policy. 45 (1). University of Toronto Press: 32–47. doi:10.3138/cpp.2017-061. JSTOR 26732978.
- Koster, Rhonda L. P.; Lemelin, Raynald Harvey (2013). "The Forgotten Industry in the Forgotten North: Tourism Developments in Northern Ontario". In Conteh, Charles; Segsworth, Bob (eds.). Governance in Northern Ontario: Economic Development and Policy Making. University of Toronto Press. pp. 162–184. ISBN 978-1-4426-6285-8. JSTOR 10.3138/j.ctt5hjvwq.
- Kuhlberg, Mark (2015). In the Power of the Government: The Rise and Fall of Newsprint in Ontario, 1894–1932. University of Toronto Press. ISBN 978-1-4426-6620-7. JSTOR 10.3138/j.ctt14bthcm.
- Lee, David (2006). Lumber Kings and Shantymen: Logging and Lumbering in the Ottawa Valley. James Lorimer & Company. ISBN 9781550289220.
- Lewis, Frank; Urquhart, M. C. (January 1999). "Growth and the Standard of Living in a Pioneer Economy: Upper Canada, 1826 to 1851". William and Mary Quarterly. 56 (1). Omohundro Institute of Early American History and Culture: 151–181. doi:10.2307/2674598. hdl:10419/189259. JSTOR 2674598.
- McBurney, Margaret; Byers, Mary (1987). Tavern in the Town: Early Inns and Taverns of Ontario. University of Toronto Press. ISBN 9780802057327. OCLC 23215182.
- McCalla, Douglas (1993). Planting the Province: The Economic History of Upper Canada 1784–1870. Ontario Historical Studies Series. University of Toronto Press. ISBN 978-0-8020-3407-6.
- Santink, Joy L. (1990). Timothy Eaton and the Rise of His Department Store. University of Toronto Press. ISBN 978-1-4875-8010-0. JSTOR 10.3138/j.ctvfrxpgz.
- Shewchuk, John (1986). The development of the textile trade at Galt, Preston and Hespeler, 1832–1914.
- Sweeney, Brendan (Spring 2009). "Sixty Years on the Margin: The Evolution of Ontario's Tree Planting Industry and Labour Force: 1945–2007". Labour / Le Travail. 63. Canadian Committee on Labour History: 47–78. JSTOR 40650235.
- Tufts, Steven. "The Geography of the Ontario Service Economy". In Albo, Greg; Evans, Bryan M. (eds.). Divided Province: Ontario Politics in the Age of Neoliberalism. pp. 77–102. doi:10.2307/j.ctvbj7g4v. ISBN 978-0-7735-5567-9.
- Watson, Denis McLean (1971). Frontier movement and economic development in northeastern Ontario, 1850–1914 (Thesis). University of British Columbia. doi:10.14288/1.0093280.

=== Agriculture and agricultural products ===
- Derry, Margaret (2001). Ontario's Cattle Kingdom: Purebred Breeders and Their World, 1870–1920. University of Toronto Press. doi:10.3138/9781442678095. ISBN 978-1-4426-7809-5.
- Dunsworth, Edward (Spring 2017). "Green Gold, Red Threats: Organization and Resistance in Depression-Era Ontario Tobacco". Labour / Le Travail. 79. Canadian Committee on Labour History: 105–142. doi:10.1353/llt.2017.0004. JSTOR 44820373.
- Jarrell, Richard A. (November 2016). "Agricultural Education in Ontario". Educating the Neglected Majority: The Struggle for Agricultural and Technical Education in Nineteenth-Century Ontario and Quebec. McGill–Queen's University Press. pp. 131–163. ISBN 978-0-7735-4738-4.
- MacDonald, G. T. (2014). "Ontario agriculture in an urbanizing economy 1951–1966". In Bourne, L. S.; MacKinnon, R. D. (eds.). Urban Systems Development in Central Canada. Heritage. University of Toronto Press. pp. 222–233. ISBN 978-1-4426-3232-5. JSTOR 10.3138/j.ctt15jvw54.
- Marr, William L. (February 1981). "The Wheat Economy in Reverse: Ontario's Wheat Production, 1887–1917". Canadian Journal of Economics / Revue canadienne d'économique. 14 (1). Wiley: 136–145. doi:10.2307/134849. JSTOR 134849.
- McLeod, Alan; St. John, Jordan (2014). Ontario Beer: A Heady History of Brewing from the Great Lakes to the Hudson Bay. History Press. ISBN 9781626192560.
- Ontario Hereford Association (2005). Hereford memoirs Ontario: history and highlights of the White-Faced Hereford Cattle and their breeders in the province of Ontario from 1860 to 2005. Ontario Hereford Association. ISBN 0973689706.
- West, Doug (2013). "Agri-Food Policy in Northern Ontario: Is It Possible to Steward a Local or Regional Agri-Food Economy?". In Conteh, Charles; Segsworth, Bob (eds.). Governance in Northern Ontario: Economic Development and Policy Making. University of Toronto Press. pp. 137–161. ISBN 978-1-4426-6285-8. JSTOR 10.3138/j.ctt5hjvwq.

=== Labour, trades, and unions ===
- Dunsworth, Edward (Spring 2017). "Green Gold, Red Threats: Organization and Resistance in Depression-Era Ontario Tobacco". Labour / Le Travail. 79. Canadian Committee on Labour History: 105–142. doi:10.1353/llt.2017.0004. JSTOR 44820373.
- Kristofferson, Robert B. (2007). Craft Capitalism: Craftsworkers and Early Industrialization in Hamilton, Ontario. Canadian Social History Series. University of Toronto Press. doi:10.3138/9781442684225. ISBN 978-1-4426-8422-5. JSTOR 10.3138/9781442684225.
- Munro, Katherine (Fall 2014). "A 'Unique Experiment': The Ontario Labour Court, 1943–1944". Labour / Le Travail. 74. Canadian Committee on Labour History: 199–247. JSTOR 24244186.
- Silvestre, Javier (Autumn 2010). "Improving Workplace Safety in the Ontario Manufacturing Industry, 1914–1939". Business History Review. 84 (3): 527–550. doi:10.1017/S0007680500002233. JSTOR 27917262.
- Sweeney, Brendan (Spring 2009). "Sixty Years on the Margin: The Evolution of Ontario's Tree Planting Industry and Labour Force: 1945–2007". Labour / Le Travail. 63. Canadian Committee on Labour History: 47–78. JSTOR 40650235.
- Vosko, Leah F. (Fall 2010). "A New Approach to Regulating Temporary Agency Work in Ontario or Back to the Future?". Industrial Relations. 65 (4). Département des Relations Industrielles, Université Laval: 632–653. doi:10.7202/045589ar. JSTOR 23078323.

=== Manufacturing ===
- Anastakis, Dimitry (2018). "A Neoliberal Pause?: The Auto and Manufacturing Sectors in Ontario since Free Trade". In Albo, Greg; Evans, Bryan M. (eds.). Divided Province: Ontario Politics in the Age of Neoliberalism. pp. 103–129. doi:10.2307/j.ctvbj7g4v. ISBN 978-0-7735-5567-9.
- Goracinova, Elena; Warrian, Peter; Wolfe, David A. (January 2017). "Challenges of Coordination: Automotive Innovation in the Ontario Supply Chain in Comparative Context". Canadian Public Policy. 43 (S1). University of Toronto Press: S90–S102. doi:10.3138/cpp.2016-024. JSTOR 90000014.
- McQueen, Rod; Papp, Susan M. (2012). Driven to Succeed: How Frank Hasenfratz Grew Linamar from Guelph to Global. Dundurn Press. ISBN 978-1459707955.
- Mordue, Greigory D. (January 2017). "Doors Closed and Opportunities Missed: Lessons from Failed Automotive Investment Attraction in Canada in the 1980s". Canadian Public Policy. 41 (S1). University of Toronto Press: S43–S56. doi:10.3138/cpp.2016-022. JSTOR 90000011.
- Roberts, David (2006). In the Shadow of Detroit: Gordon M. McGregor, Ford of Canada, and Motoropolis. Wayne State University Press. ISBN 978-0-8143-3284-9.
- Silvestre, Javier (Autumn 2010). "Improving Workplace Safety in the Ontario Manufacturing Industry, 1914–1939". Business History Review. 84 (3): 527–550. doi:10.1017/S0007680500002233. JSTOR 27917262.
- Sweeney, Brendan A.; Mordue, Greigory D. (January 2017). "The Restructuring of Canada's Automotive Industry, 2005–2014". Canadian Public Policy. 43 (S1). University of Toronto Press: S1–S15. doi:10.3138/cpp.2016-026. JSTOR 90000008.

== Transport ==
- Andreae, C. A. (1972). A Historical Railway Atlas of Southwestern Ontario. C. A. Andreae.
- Ashdown, Dana (1988). Railway Steamships of Ontario, 1850–1950. Erin, Ontario: Boston Mills Press. ISBN 0-919783-80-5.
- Baskerville, Peter (1981). "Americans in Britain's backyard: the railway era in Upper Canada, 1850–1880". Business History Review. 55 (3): 314–336. doi:10.2307/3114127. JSTOR 3114127.
- Beaumont, Ralph (1977). Steam Trains to the Bruce. Boston Mills Press.
- Berchem, F. R. (1977). The Yonge Street Story: 1793–1860. McGraw-Hill Ryerson. ISBN 0-07-082567-X.
- Bonsor, N. C. (1977). Transportation Rates and Economic Development in Northern Ontario. Heritage. University of Toronto Press. ISBN 978-1-4426-3223-3. JSTOR 10.3138/j.ctt15jvx01.
- Bowers, Peter (1983). Two Divisions to Bluewater: The Story of the C.N.R. to the Bruce. Boston Mills Press.
- Bradford, Robert (2015). Keeping Ontario Moving: The History of Roads and Road Building in Ontario. Dundurn Press. ISBN 978-1-4597-2412-9.
- Breithaupt, William Henry (1919). "Early Roads And Transportation: Upper Canada". Seventh Annual Report Of The Waterloo Historical Society, 1919 (PDF) (Report). Waterloo Historical Society. pp. 59–66.
- Brown, Ron (2011). In Search of the Grand Trunk: Ghost Rail Lines in Ontario. Dundurn Press. ISBN 978-1-55488-882-5.
- Brown, Ron (October 2013). Rails Across Ontario: Exploring Ontario's Railway Heritage. Dundurn Press. ISBN 978-1-4597-0753-5.
- Burghardt, Andrew F. (February 1990). "Some Economic Constraints on Land Transportation in Upper Canada/Canada West". Urban History Review. 18 (3). University of Toronto Press: 232–236. doi:10.7202/1017719ar. JSTOR 43561991.
- Byers, Mary; McBurney, Margaret (1982). The Governor's Road: Early Buildings and Families from Mississauga to London.
- Davis, Donald F. (October 1998). "The Canadian Taxi Wars, 1925–1950". Urban History Review. 27 (1). University of Toronto Press: 7–22. doi:10.7202/1016609ar. JSTOR 43562185.
- Farber, Steven; Marino, Maria Grandez (September 2017). "Transit accessibility, land development and socioeconomic priority: A typology of planned station catchment areas in the Greater Toronto and Hamilton Area". Journal of Transport and Land Use. 10 (1): 879–902. doi:10.5198/jtlu.2017.980. hdl:11299/191073. JSTOR 26211760.
- Frankena, Mark W. (1982). Urban Transportation Financing: Theory and Policy in Ontario. Heritage Series. University of Toronto Press. ISBN 9780802033802. JSTOR 10.3138/j.ctt1vgw954.
- Fraser, David; Thomas, Evan R. (Autumn 1982). "Moose-Vehicle Accidents in Ontario: Relation to Highway Salt". Wildlife Society Bulletin. 10 (3). Wiley: 261–265. JSTOR 3781015.
- Guay, David R. P. (2015). Great Western Railway of Canada: Southern Ontario's Pioneer Railway. Dundurn Press. ISBN 978-1-4597-3283-4.
- Guillet, Edwin C. (1963). Pioneer Travel in Upper Canada. University of Toronto Press.
- Gunson, Kari E.; Schueler, Frederick W. (December 2012). "Effective Placement of Road Mitigation Using Lessons Learned from Turtle Crossing Signs in Ontario". Ecological Restoration. 30 (4). University of Wisconsin Press: 329–334. Bibcode:2012EcoRe..30..329G. doi:10.3368/er.30.4.329. JSTOR 43441506.
- Jackson, John N.; Burtniak, John (1978). Railways in the Niagara Peninsula. Mika Publishing.
- Johnson, David R.; Nicholas, Joseline (March 2019). "Light Rail Transit and Property Values in Kitchener–Waterloo". Canadian Public Policy. 45 (1). University of Toronto Press: 32–47. doi:10.3138/cpp.2017-061. JSTOR 26732978.
- Lambert, Maude-Emmanuelle (2016). "Automobile Tourism in Quebec and Ontario: Development, Promotion, and Representations, 1920–1945". In Bradley, Ben; Young, Jay; Coates, Colin M. (eds.). Moving Natures: Mobility and the Environment in Canadian History (PDF). Canadian History and Environment. University of Calgary Press. pp. 299–322. doi:10.2307/j.ctv6cfr6m. ISBN 978-1-55238-861-7.
- MacKinnon, R. D.; Hodgson, M. J.; Bushell, G. E. (2014). "Transportation network models for the southern Ontario and Quebec system of cities". In Bourne, L. S.; MacKinnon, R. D. (eds.). Urban Systems Development in Central Canada. Heritage. University of Toronto Press. pp. 165–185. ISBN 978-1-4426-3232-5. JSTOR 10.3138/j.ctt15jvw54.
- Miller, Marilyn G.; Bucovetsky, Joe; Sisam, Elizabeth (1978). Straight lines in curved space: colonization roads in eastern Ontario. Ontario Ministry of Culture and Recreation, Historical Planning and Research Branch. ISBN 0-7743-2978-5.
- Mills, John M. (1977). Traction on The Grand: The Story of Electric Railways along Ontario's Grand River Valley. Railfare Enterprises. ISBN 0-919130-27-5.
- Ryell, J.; Smith, P. (1968). "Case Histories of Poor Concrete Durability in Ontario Highway Structures". In Swenson, E. G. (ed.). Performance of Concrete: Resistance of Concrete to Sulphate and Other Environmental Conditions; A Symposium in Honour of Thorbergur Thorvaldson. Heritage. University of Toronto Press. pp. 181–204. ISBN 978-1-4875-8409-2. JSTOR 10.3138/j.ctvfrxb4n.
- Shragge, John; Bagnato, Sharon (1984). From Footpaths to Freeways. Ontario Ministry of Transportation and Communications, Historical Committee. ISBN 0-7743-9388-2.
- Smith, Douglas N. W. (2004). A Century of Travel on the Ontario Northland Railway. Trackside Canada. ISBN 0-9730521-1-2.
- Stamp, Robert M. (1987). QEW – Canada's First Superhighway. The Boston Mills Press. ISBN 0-919783-84-8.
- Surtees, Robert J. (1992). The Northern Connection: Ontario Northland Since 1902. Captus Press. ISBN 978-0-921801-85-6.
- Sutcliffe, John B.; Cipkar, Sarah (Winter 2017). "Citizen Participation in the Public Transportation Policy Process: A Comparison of Detroit, Michigan, and Hamilton, Ontario". Canadian Journal of Urban Research. 26 (2). Institute of Urban Studies, University of Winnipeg: 33–51. doi:10.36939/cjur/vol26no2/art95. JSTOR 26290769.
- Topalovic, P.; Carter, J.; Topalovic, M.; Krantzberg, G. (September 2012). "Light Rail Transit in Hamilton: Health, Environmental and Economic Impact Analysis". Social Indicators Research. 108 (2). Springer: 329–350. doi:10.1007/s11205-012-0069-x. JSTOR 23260314.
- Wiginton, Lindsay; Heyman, Eli; Allen, Jeff (1 November 2018). Fare Pricing: Exploring how road pricing on the DVP and Gardiner would impact income groups in the GTHA (Report). Pembina Institute. JSTOR resrep22104.
- Wilson, Dale (2009). Algoma Rails. Nickel Belt Rails. ISBN 978-0920356159.

== Governance and public policy ==
=== Education ===
- Barber, Marilyn. "The Ontario Bilingual Schools Issue: Sources of Conflict," Canadian Historical Review, (1966) 47$3 pp 227–248
- Bedard, George, and Stephen Lawion. "The struggle for power and control: shifting policy-making models and the Harris agenda for education in Ontario." Canadian Public Administration. 43.3 (2000): 241–269. This article provides a theoretical explanation of the models that Ontario public education policy has followed throughout the history of its development. Despite changes in centralization over the years, the article notes that under Harris and his Common Sense Revolution, the education policy system reached unprecedented levels of politicization and centralization. The "administrative agency" model is touted as the traditional model for the public education system. In this context, an examination of the Common Sense Revolution model will help to show whether or not it was a break from the political and policy tradition. The article also provides elucidation on the difference between the neo-conservative and neo-liberal ideological approaches. It concludes that educational policy-making has changed dramatically; although perhaps not solely because of the Common Sense Revolution.
- Croteau, Jean-Philippe. "History of Education in French-Speaking Ontario: A Historiographic Review." Canadian Issues (2014): 23-30 online
- Di Mascio, Anthony (2012). Idea of Popular Schooling in Upper Canada: Print Culture, Public Discourse, and the Demand for Education. McGill–Queen's University Press. ISBN 978-0-7735-8703-8. JSTOR j.ctt12838j.
- El Masri, Amira (2020). "Who Speaks for International Education?: An Ontario Case Study". In Tamtik, Merli; Trilokekar, Roopa Desai; Jones, Glen A. (eds.). International Education as Public Policy in Canada. McGill–Queen's University Press. doi:10.2307/j.ctv18sqz9q. ISBN 978-0-228-00310-6.
- Gaffield, Chad (1987). Language, Schooling, and Cultural Conflict: The Origins of the French Language Controversy in Ontario. McGill–Queen's University Press. ISBN 0-7735-0602-0. JSTOR j.ctt80g1x.
- Gidney, R.D. "From Hope to Harris: The Reshaping of Ontario Schools." University of Toronto Press, 1999. This book chronicles the Ontario education system from the mid-century royal commission, chaired by Justice John Andre Hope that set the post-war educational landscape, to the changes presented by the Harris government at the end of the century. Gidney presents these two points as his beginning and conclusion while describing all the educational developments in between these two eras of drastic change. Gidney uses this period to present and explain three motifs of focus: governance, educational finance, and curriculum. Rather than focusing on specific issues such as separate school funding and French language schooling, he attempts to explain such issues through the aforementioned overarching general themes that he argues are crucial to understanding the Ontario education system and its intricacies.
- Gidney, Robert Douglas; Millar, Winnifred Phoebe Joyce (1990). Inventing Secondary Education: The Rise of the High School in Nineteenth-Century Ontario. McGill–Queen's University Press. ISBN 978-0-7735-6239-4. JSTOR j.ctt808v6.
- Houston, Susan E.; Prentice, Alison (1988). Schooling and Scholars in Nineteenth-Century Ontario. University of Toronto Press. ISBN 978-1-4426-7962-7. JSTOR 10.3138/j.ctt2tv1sm.
- Jarrell, Richard A. (November 2016). Educating the Neglected Majority: The Struggle for Agricultural and Technical Education in Nineteenth-Century Ontario and Quebec. McGill–Queen's University Press. ISBN 978-0-7735-4738-4.
- McKillop, A. B. (1994). Matters of Mind: The University in Ontario, 1791–1951. University of Toronto Press. ISBN 978-1-4875-7179-5. JSTOR 10.3138/j.ctvcj2q67.
- Neatby, H. Blair; McEown, Don (2002). Creating Carleton: The Shaping of a University. McGill–Queen's University Press. ISBN 978-0-7735-7075-7. JSTOR j.ctt130hhjn.
- Prentice, Allison (2004). The School Promoters: Education and Social Class in Mid-Nineteenth Century Upper Canada. University of Toronto Press. doi:10.3138/9781442682306. ISBN 978-1-4426-8230-6.
- Shapiro, Bernard. "The Public Funding of Private Schools in Ontario: The Setting, Some Arguments, and Some Matters of Belief." Canadian Journal of Education. 11:3 (1986): 264–77. In this article, Bernard Shapiro provides a description of the debate surrounding public funding of private schools in Ontario. He presents the three main arguments of both those in favour and those against public funding for private schools. The arguments of the former camp are as follows: First, parents should have the right to choose the best education environment for their children. Second, it is discriminatory to fund catholic schools and no others and third, parents who send their children to private school should not have to pay taxes for public schools. The counter arguments presented against these points deal with: The financial constraint of the province, the issue of a growth of population segregation, and that it denies equality of education by creating a two-tier education system. Shapiro offers an in-depth analysis of these issues presenting supporting points for both camps. This analysis as examined through a set of personal beliefs as to what education should represent, Shapiro concludes with his own argument that Ontario should modify its current arrangements with regards to private schools.
- Snowdon, Ken (2014). "Internationalization in Canadian Higher Education: The Ontario Experience". In Bruno-Jofré, Rosa; Johnston, James Scott (eds.). Teacher Education in a Transnational World. University of Toronto Press. pp. 367–389. ISBN 978-1-4426-1999-9. JSTOR 10.3138/j.ctt1287q56.
- Stamp, Robert M. The schools of Ontario, 1876–1976 (University of Toronto Press, 1982)
- Stamp, Robert M. "The Historical Background to Separate Schools in Ontario." (Ministry of Education, 1985.) This book provides a historical background of separate schools in Ontario. It outlines a chronological table of the development of separate schools beginning with the 1841 act which established "common schools" for those of a different faith. It lists several other acts, notable developments and their significance to the issue. The list concludes with a 1984 statement made by Premier Davis, which establishes full funding for Catholic schools through grade 13. In addition to this list, the book provides a narrative account of significant issues and the development of the separate school system during this period.
- White, Linda A. (2003). "Liberalism, Group Rights and the Boundaries of Toleration: The Case of Minority Religious Schools in Ontario". Canadian Journal of Political Science. 36 (5). Canadian Political Science Association: 975–1003. doi:10.1017/S0008423903778937. JSTOR 3233387. Examines the issue of separate school funding in Ontario as a question of balancing community and individual rights and the obligation the province has in finding an equilibrium between maintaining its liberal institutions and supporting the rights of those cultural groups affected by the status quo. Article proposes a solution to balance these issues in Ontario while offering an argument in support of funding for faith-based schools based on the notion of the right to culture for minority groups.
- Zinga, Dawn. "Ontario's Challenge: Denominational Rights in Public Education." Canadian Journal of Educational Administration and Policy. 80 (2008). In this article, Dawn Zinga discusses the separate schooling issue and the challenge it presents towards denominational rights. Zinga structures this paper through a focus of three areas. It begins with a description of how Catholic schools came to be publicly funded in Ontario. Zinga then examines how Ontario has dealt with the issue of denominational rights in education and looks at what other challenges Ontario faces given the change of Canadian society since confederation. Through these areas of focus the issue is examined both from a historical perspective and as a current political issue with particular focus on the influence of the issue during the 2007 election. Concludes with the idea that it is up to the province going forward and any changes to the educational system will depend on how Ontario chooses to address this issue.

=== Social welfare ===
- Dumbrill, Gary C. (2006). "Ontario's Child Welfare Transformation: Another Swing of the Pendulum?". Canadian Social Work Review. 23 (1/2). Canadian Association for Social Work Education: 5–19. JSTOR 41669842.
- Lightman, Ernie S. (1997). "It's Not a Walk in the Park: Workfare in Ontario". In Shragge, Eric (ed.). Workfare: Ideology for a New Under-Class. University of Toronto Press. pp. 85–108. ISBN 978-1-4426-0311-0. JSTOR 10.3138/j.ctvg253kf. An analysis of workfare as implemented in Ontario after the Conservative victory in 1995. Looks at welfare reform under the Liberal and NDP governments, compares the Liberal's Red Book to the Conservative's Common Sense Revolution and what they meant for the 1995 election, and finally examines the effect of workfare in Ontario post-election. Concludes that workfare does not do much more than create obligatory tasks for welfare dependents. Instead, it helps dismantle 'big' government and the social services it provides, all to the benefit of corporations and the wealthy.
- Little, Margaret Jane Hillyard (1998). 'No Car, No Radio, No Liquor Permit': The Moral Regulation of Single Mothers in Ontario, 1920–1997. Oxford University Press. ISBN 0-19-541150-1. Provides in-depth account of moral regulations of OMA recipients. Traces the origins of the program, its implementation and administration. Argues that it was created with the classist, racist, gendered ideology of the middle-class men and women. Looks at the role of maternal ideology in debates around mother's allowance. In contrast to Andrew, argues that women had influence in the administration of the state policy. The U.S. and Canadian provinces already had a similar policy in action. Women could vote for the first time, so Drury's Conservative government wanted to secure that vote by implementing mother's allowance. State took responsibility of moral control of its citizens by strict eligibility criteria of the OMA. While some aspects of the welfare state became routinized and bureaucratized, it remained to be highly subjective. Sexual life, personal hygiene, housekeeping, race/ethnicity of the applicants were under scrutiny by the citizens and the government officials. At the same time, family violence and women's health were rarely considered.
- Shibuya, Kumiko (September 2018). "Dynamics of Permanent Exit from Welfare in Ontario, Canada". Canadian Public Policy. 44 (3). University of Toronto Press: 241–258. doi:10.3138/cpp.2017-030. JSTOR 90025235.

== Society ==
=== General ===
- Bumsted, J. M. (2014). The Peoples of Canada: A Pre-Confederation History (fourth ed.). Oxford University Press. ISBN 978-0-1954-4636-4.
- Bumsted, J. M. (2013). The Peoples of Canada: A Post-Confederation History (fourth ed.). Oxford University Press. ISBN 978-0-1954-4631-9.

=== Language ===
- Gaffield, Chad (1987). Language, Schooling, and Cultural Conflict: The Origins of the French Language Controversy in Ontario. McGill–Queen's University Press. ISBN 0-7735-0602-0. JSTOR j.ctt80g1x.
- Kalbfleisch, Herbert Karl (1968). The History of the Pioneer German Language Press of Ontario, 1835–1918. University of Toronto Press. ISBN 978-1-4875-8906-6.

=== Religion ===
==== General ====
- Marks, Lynne (1996). Revivals and Roller Rinks: Religion, Leisure and Identity in Late-Nineteenth-Century Small-Town Ontario. University of Toronto Press. doi:10.3138/9781442679344. ISBN 978-1-4426-7934-4.
- White, Linda A. (2003). "Liberalism, Group Rights and the Boundaries of Toleration: The Case of Minority Religious Schools in Ontario". Canadian Journal of Political Science. 36 (5). Canadian Political Science Association: 975–1003. doi:10.1017/S0008423903778937. JSTOR 3233387. Examines the issue of separate school funding in Ontario as a question of balancing community and individual rights and the obligation the province has in finding an equilibrium between maintaining its liberal institutions and supporting the rights of those cultural groups affected by the status quo. Article proposes a solution to balance these issues in Ontario while offering an argument in support of funding for faith-based schools based on the notion of the right to culture for minority groups.

==== Catholicism ====
- McGowan, Mark G. (2005). Michael Power: The Struggle to Build the Catholic Church on the Canadian Frontier. McGill–Queen's University Press. ISBN 978-0-7735-7296-6. JSTOR j.ctt80q9d.
- McGowan, Mark George; Clarke, Brian P., eds. (1993). Catholics at the "Gathering Place": Historical Essays on the Archdiocese of Toronto, 1841–1991. Canadian Catholic Historical Association. ISBN 096922981X.
- Spetz, Theobald (1916). The Catholic Church in Waterloo County. The Catholic Register and Extension.

==== Protestantism ====
- Bryce, Benjamin (2015). "Entangled Communities: German Lutherans in Ontario and North America, 1880–1930". In Bryce, Benjamin; Freund, Alexander (eds.). Entangling Migration History: Borderlands and Transnationalism in the United States and Canada. Contested Boundaries. University Press of Florida. pp. 162–180. doi:10.2307/j.ctvx073k0. ISBN 978-0-8130-5529-9.
- Dunham, Bertha Mabel (October 1924). The Trail of the Conestoga. Macmillan.
- Gingrich, Luann Good; Lightman, Ernie (April 2006). "Striving toward Self-Sufficiency: A Qualitative Study of Mutual Aid in an Old Order Mennonite Community". Family Relations. 55 (2). National Council on Family Relations: 175–189. doi:10.1111/j.1741-3729.2006.00368.x. JSTOR 40005328. Studies families in Ontario.
- Muir, Elizabeth Gillan (1991). Petticoats in the Pulpit: The Story of Early Nineteenth-century Methodist Women Preachers in Upper Canada. United Church Publishing House. ISBN 978-0-919000-78-0.
- Reaman, George Elmore (1965). The Trail of the Black Walnut (revised ed.). McClelland and Stewart. Focuses heavily on the journey of Anabaptists and other religious non-conformists from Pennsylvania to Upper Canada in the early 19th century.
- Webb, Todd (2013). Transatlantic Methodists: British Wesleyanism and the Formation of an Evangelical Culture in Nineteenth-Century Ontario and Quebec. McGill–Queen's University Press. ISBN 978-0-7735-8913-1. JSTOR j.ctt32b72z.
- Westfall, William (1989). Two Worlds: The Protestant Culture of Nineteenth-Century Ontario. McGill–Queen's University Press. ISBN 978-0-7735-6181-6. JSTOR j.ctt808zj.

=== Race and ethnicity ===
==== Black and African ====
- Baily, Marilyn (October 1973). "From Cincinnati, Ohio to Wilberforce, Canada: A Note on Antebellum Colonization". The Journal of Negro History. 58 (4). University of Chicago Press: 427–440. doi:10.2307/2716748. JSTOR 2716748.
- Barker, Gordon S. (2018). "Revisiting 'British Principle Talk': Antebellum Black Expectations and Racism in Early Ontario". In Pargas, Damian Alan (ed.). Fugitive Slaves and Spaces of Freedom in North America. University Press of Florida. doi:10.2307/j.ctvx06x80.
- Riendeau, Roger E. (1984). An Enduring Heritage: Black Contributions to Early Ontario. Dundurn Press. ISBN 0919670830.
- Shadd, Ruth Ann (1995). Breaking Loose: A History of African-Canadian Dance in Southwestern Ontario 1900-1955. Preney Print & Litho. ISBN 0969858205.
- Silverman, Jason H. (1985). Unwelcome Guests: Canada West's Response to American Fugitive Slaves, 1800-1865. Associated Faculty Press. ISBN 0804693773.
- Simpson, Donald George (2005). Under the North Star: Black Communities in Upper Canada Before Confederation. Africa World Press. ISBN 1-59221-354-5.

==== English ====
- Cameron, Wendy; Maude, Mary McDougall (2000). Assisting Emigration to Upper Canada: The Petworth Project, 1832–1837. McGill–Queen's University Press. ISBN 978-0-7735-6832-7. JSTOR j.ctt8120w. An overview of the Petworth Emigration Scheme.
- Campey, Lucille H. (August 2012). Seeking a Better Future: The English Pioneers of Ontario and Quebec. Dundurn Press. ISBN 978-1-4597-0351-3.
- Godin, V. N. (2002). Petworth People: The Untold Story of the Petworth Emigrants of Oxford County. Oxford County Branch, Ontario Genealogical Society.
- Van Vugt, William E. (2021). "Upper Canada". Portrait of an English Migration: North Yorkshire People in North America. McGill–Queen's University Press. pp. 129–146. doi:10.2307/j.ctv1h7zmmq. ISBN 978-0-228-00686-2.

==== Finnish ====
- Saarinen, Oiva W. (1999). Between a Rock and a Hard Place: A Historical Geography of the Finns in the Sudbury Area. Wilfrid Laurier University Press. ISBN 978-0-88920-353-2.
- Tester, Jim, ed. (1986). Sports Pioneers: A History of the Finnish-Canadian Amateur Sports Federation 1906-1986. Alerts AC Historical Committee. ISBN 0-9692405-0-3.

==== German ====
- Bausenhart, Werner A. (1972). "The Ontario German Language Press and Its Suppression by Order-in-Council in 1918". Canadian Ethnic Studies. 4 (1–2): 35–48. ISSN 0008-3496.
- Bausenhart, Werner (1989). German Immigration and Assimilation in Ontario, 1783–1918. Legas. ISBN 0-921252-10-2.
- Bryce, Benjamin (2015). "Entangled Communities: German Lutherans in Ontario and North America, 1880–1930". In Bryce, Benjamin; Freund, Alexander (eds.). Entangling Migration History: Borderlands and Transnationalism in the United States and Canada. Contested Boundaries. University Press of Florida. pp. 162–180. doi:10.2307/j.ctvx073k0. ISBN 978-0-8130-5529-9.
- Doering, J. Frederick (1936). "Pennsylvania German Folk Medicine in Waterloo County, Ontario". Journal of American Folklore. 49 (193). American Folklore Society: 194–198. doi:10.2307/535400. JSTOR 535400.
- Kalbfleisch, Herbert Karl (1968). The History of the Pioneer German Language Press of Ontario, 1835–1918. University of Toronto Press. ISBN 978-1-4875-8906-6.
- Reaman, George Elmore (1965). The Trail of the Black Walnut (revised ed.). McClelland and Stewart. Discusses the German origins of a number of settlers in Upper Canada.
- Tötösy de Zepetnek, Steven (1995). "Early German-Canadian Ethnic Minority Writing". Canadian Ethnic Studies. 27 (1): 99–122. ISSN 0008-3496.

==== Italian ====
- Agnoletto, Stefano (2014). The Italians Who Built Toronto: Italian Workers and Contractors in the City's Housebuilding Industry, 1950–1980. Peter Lang. ISBN 9783034317733.
- Arcangelo, Martino (2000). Italian roots and Canadian blossoms: a history of Brantford's Italian-Canadian community, 1880–1999. Almar. ISBN 0968733700.
- DiGiacomo, James Louis (1982). They live in the Moneta: an overview of the history and changes in social organization of Italians in Timmins Ontario. York University, Institute for Behavioural Research, Ethnic Research Programme.
- Piovesana, Roy Henry (2011). Italians of Fort William's East End, 1907–1969. Institute of Italian Studies, Lakehead University. ISBN 9780973804218.
- Scardellato, Gabriele Pietro (1995). Within our temple: a history of the Order Sons of Italy of Ontario. Order Sons of Italy of Canada. ISBN 0969958307.
- Temelini, Walter (2019). The Leamington Italian Community: Ethnicity and Identity in Canada. Leamington Roma Club/McGill-Queen's University Press. ISBN 9780773554696.
- Zucchi, John (1981). The Italian immigrants of the St. John's Ward, 1875–1915: patterns of settlement and neighbourhood formation. Multicultural History Society of Ontario. ISBN 0919045057.

==== Irish ====
- Akenson, Donald Harman (1999). Irish in Ontario: A Study in Rural History (2nd ed.). McGill–Queen's University Press. ISBN 978-0-7735-6098-7. JSTOR j.ctt7zsz3g.
- Boyde, Jack (2008). On Creaking Ships. Cranberry Tree Press. ISBN 978-1-894668-32-3.
- Campey, Lucille H. (2018). Ontario and Quebec's Irish Pioneers: Farmers, Labourers, and Lumberjacks. Dundurn Press. ISBN 978-1-4597-4086-0. OCLC 1054067311.
- Elliott, Bruce S. (2004). Irish Migrants in the Canadas: A New Approach. McGill–Queen's University Press. ISBN 978-0-7735-6992-8. JSTOR j.ctt14bs0mj.
- Heald, Carolyn A. (2009). The Irish Palatines In Ontario: Religion, Ethnicity, and Rural Migration (2nd ed.). Global Heritage Press. ISBN 978-1-897446-37-9. OCLC 430037634.
- Hedican, Edward J. (2020). After the Famine: The Irish Family Farm in Eastern Ontario, 1851–1881. University of Toronto Press. ISBN 978-1-4875-2384-8.
- Manning, Aidan (2009). Between the Runways: A History of Irish-Catholic Settlement in Southern Peel County and Etobicoke. Aidan Manning. ISBN 978-0-9730291-2-3.
- OGS Irish Palatine Special Interest Group (2010). Irish Palatine Pioneers in Upper Canada, Commemorating 300 Years 1709–2009. Ontario Genealogical Society. ISBN 978-0-7779-3438-8.
- Runnalls, J. L. (1973). The Irish on the Welland Canal. St. Catharines Public Library.
- Sanderson, Gordon J. (2000). The Luck of the Irish in Canada: A History of the Irish Benevolent Society of London and Middlesex. Irish Benevolent Society of London and Middlesex.

==== Others ====
- Campey, Lucille H. (2005). The Scottish Pioneers of Upper Canada, 1784–1855: Glengarry and Beyond. Natural Heritage Books. ISBN 1897045018.
- Kendall, Perry Robert William (1992). The Portuguese Canadian community in Toronto. City of Toronto Dept. of Public Health, Health Promotion and Advocacy Section.
- Schryer, Frans J. (February 1998). The Netherlandic Presence in Ontario: Pillars, Class and Dutch Ethnicity. Wilfrid Laurier University Press. ISBN 978-0-88920-312-9. Focus is on post-WWII.

=== Immigration ===
- Cameron, Wendy; Maude, Mary McDougall (2000). Assisting Emigration to Upper Canada: The Petworth Project, 1832–1837. McGill–Queen's University Press. ISBN 978-0-7735-6832-7. JSTOR j.ctt8120w. An overview of the Petworth Emigration Scheme.
- Elliott, Bruce S. (2004). Irish Migrants in the Canadas: A New Approach. McGill–Queen's University Press. ISBN 978-0-7735-6992-8. JSTOR j.ctt14bs0mj.
- Hoffman, Frances (1999). Across the Waters: Ontario Immigrants' Experiences, 1820–1850. Global. ISBN 1-894378-00-8.

=== Women and gender ===
- Baskerville, Peter A. (2008). A Silent Revolution?: Gender and Wealth in English Canada, 1860–1930. McGill–Queen's University Press. ISBN 978-0-7735-7445-8. JSTOR j.ctt80c7c.
- Brookfield, Tarah (2018). Our voices must be heard: women and the vote in Ontario. University of British Columbia Press. ISBN 9780774860192.
- Campbell, Lara (2009). Respectable Citizens: Gender, Family, and Unemployment in Ontario's Great Depression. University of Toronto Press. doi:10.3138/9781442697416. ISBN 9781442697416.
- Carbert, Louise Irene (1995). Agrarian Feminism: The Politics of Ontario Farm Women. University of Toronto Press.
- Cohen, Marjorie Griffin (1988). Women's Work, Markets, and Economic Development in Nineteenth-Century Ontario. Heritage Series. University of Toronto Press. ISBN 0-8020-2651-6.
- Errington, Elizabeth Jane (1995). Wives and Mothers, School Mistresses and Scullery Maids: Working Women in Upper Canada, 1790–1840. McGill–Queen's University Press. ISBN 978-0-7735-6544-9. JSTOR j.ctt7znj0.
- Halpern, Monda (2001). And on that Farm He Had a Wife: Ontario Farm Women and Feminism, 1900–1970. McGill–Queen's University Press. ISBN 978-0-7735-2185-8.
- Kechnie, Margaret C. (2003). Organizing Rural Women: The Federated Women's Institutes of Ontario, 1897–1919. McGill–Queen's University Press. ISBN 978-0-7735-2604-4. JSTOR j.ctt7zwfj.
- Little, Margaret Jane Hillyard (1998). 'No Car, No Radio, No Liquor Permit': The Moral Regulation of Single Mothers in Ontario, 1920–1997. Oxford University Press. ISBN 0-19-541150-1. Provides in-depth account of moral regulations of OMA recipients. Traces the origins of the program, its implementation and administration. Argues that it was created with the classist, racist, gendered ideology of the middle-class men and women. Looks at the role of maternal ideology in debates around mother's allowance. In contrast to Andrew, argues that women had influence in the administration of the state policy. The U.S. and Canadian provinces already had a similar policy in action. Women could vote for the first time, so Drury's Conservative government wanted to secure that vote by implementing mother's allowance. State took responsibility of moral control of its citizens by strict eligibility criteria of the OMA. While some aspects of the welfare state became routinized and bureaucratized, it remained to be highly subjective. Sexual life, personal hygiene, housekeeping, race/ethnicity of the applicants were under scrutiny by the citizens and the government officials. At the same time, family violence and women's health were rarely considered.
- Muir, Elizabeth Gillan (1991). Petticoats in the Pulpit: The Story of Early Nineteenth-century Methodist Women Preachers in Upper Canada. United Church Publishing House. ISBN 978-0-919000-78-0.
- Parr, Joy, ed. (1995). A Diversity of Women: Ontario, 1945–1980. University of Toronto Press. OCLC 31780966.

=== Death and burial ===
- Conolly, James; Dillane, Jeffrey; Dougherty, Kate; Elaschuk, Kathleen; Csenkey, Kristen; Wagner, Teresa; Williams, Jocelyn (2014). "Early Collective Burial Practices in a Complex Wetland Setting: An Interim Report on Mortuary Patterning, Paleodietary Analysis, Zooarchaeology, Material Culture and Radiocarbon Dates from Jacob Island (BcGo-17), Kawartha Lakes, Ontario". Canadian Journal of Archaeology. 38 (1). Canadian Archaeological Association: 106–133. JSTOR 43967079.
- Katzenberg, M. Anne; Saunders, Shelley R. (2012). "Life and Death of a Mother and Child in Nineteenth-Century Ontario, Canada". In Stodder, Ann L. W.; Palkovich, Ann M. (eds.). The Bioarchaeology of Individuals. University Press of Florida. pp. 217–228. ISBN 978-0-8130-4274-9. JSTOR j.ctvx06zht.
- Paine, Cecelia (1992). "Landscape Management of Abandoned Cemeteries in Ontario". APT Bulletin: The Journal of Preservation Technology. 24 (3/4). Association for Preservation Technology International: 59–68. doi:10.2307/1504350. JSTOR 1504350.
- Smart, Susan (2011). A Better Place: Death and Burial in Nineteenth-Century Ontario. Dundurn Press. ISBN 9781459709966.

== Sports ==
- Adams, Carly (Spring 2011). "'I Just Felt Like I Belonged to Them': Women's Industrial Softball, London, Ontario, 1923–1935". Journal of Sport History. 38 (1). University of Illinois Press: 75–94. doi:10.5406/jsporthistory.38.1.75. JSTOR 10.5406/jsporthistory.38.1.75.
- Bennett, Paul W. (Fall 2016). "Training 'Blue-Blooded' Canadian Boys: Athleticism, Muscular Christianity, and Sports in Ontario's 'Little Big Four' Schools, 1829–1930". Journal of Sport History. 43 (3). University of Illinois Press: 253–271. doi:10.5406/jsporthistory.43.3.0253.
- Bouchier, Nancy B. (2003). For the Love of the Game: Amateur Sport in Small-Town Ontario, 1838–1895. McGill–Queen's University Press. ISBN 978-0-7735-7070-2. JSTOR j.ctt8101h.
- Tester, Jim, ed. (1986). Sports Pioneers: A History of the Finnish-Canadian Amateur Sports Federation 1906-1986. Alerts AC Historical Committee. ISBN 0-9692405-0-3.

== Local and regional ==
=== Northern Ontario ===
- Abel, Kerry M. (2006). Changing Places: History, Community, and Identity in Northeastern Ontario. McGill–Queen's University Press. ISBN 978-0-7735-7598-1. JSTOR j.ctt7zt54.
- Bonsor, N. C. (1977). Transportation Rates and Economic Development in Northern Ontario. Heritage. University of Toronto Press. ISBN 978-1-4426-3223-3. JSTOR 10.3138/j.ctt15jvx01.
- Brock, Gordon (1978). The Province of Northern Ontario. Cobalt, Ontario: Highway Book Shop. ISBN 0-88954-186-8.
- Conteh, Charles; Segsworth, Bob, eds. (2013). Governance in Northern Ontario: Economic Development and Policy Making. University of Toronto Press. ISBN 978-1-4426-6285-8. JSTOR 10.3138/j.ctt5hjvwq.
- Crichton, Vincent (1975). Pioneering in Northern Ontario: History of the Chapleau District. Mika Publishing. ISBN 091930303X.
- Crick, Albert (1967). The History of Nairn, 1896–1966 (PDF). Journal Printing Company.
- Douglas, Daniel G. V. (July 1996). Northern Algoma: A People's History. Dundurn Press. ISBN 978-1-55002-235-3.
- Goodwin, Clive E. (1995). "Northern Ontario". A Bird-Finding Guide to Ontario. University of Toronto Press. pp. 291–335. doi:10.3138/9781442671423. ISBN 978-1-4426-7142-3.
- Leadbeater, David (2018). "Northern Ontario and the Crisis of Development and Democracy". In Albo, Greg; Evans, Bryan M. (eds.). Divided Province: Ontario Politics in the Age of Neoliberalism. pp. 130–184. doi:10.2307/j.ctvbj7g4v. ISBN 978-0-7735-5567-9.
- Lemelin, Raynald Harvey; Koster, Rhonda (2012). "Learning from the Past, Assessing the Future: A Geo-historical Overview of Northeastern Ontario". In Nelson, Gordon (ed.). Beyond the Global City: Understanding and Planning for the Diversity of Ontario. McGill–Queen's University Press. ISBN 978-0-7735-8742-7. JSTOR j.ctt12f425.
- Mauro, Joseph M. (1981). A History of Thunder Bay. City of Thunder Bay.
- Saarinen, Oiva W. (1999). Between a Rock and a Hard Place: A Historical Geography of the Finns in the Sudbury Area. Wilfrid Laurier University Press. ISBN 978-0-88920-353-2.
- Saarinen, Oiva W. (April 2013). From Meteorite Impact to Constellation City: A Historical Geography of Greater Sudbury. Wilfrid Laurier University Press. ISBN 978-1-55458-837-4.
- Spencer, Loraine; Holland, Susan (1968). Northern Ontario: A bibliography. Heritage Series. University of Toronto Press. ISBN 9781487573188. JSTOR 10.3138/j.ctvfrxgw2.
- Watson, Denis McLean (1971). Frontier movement and economic development in northeastern Ontario, 1850–1914 (Thesis). University of British Columbia. doi:10.14288/1.0093280.
- Wilson, Dale (2009). Algoma Rails. Nickel Belt Rails. ISBN 978-0920356159.

=== Southern Ontario ===
==== Niagara Region ====
- Runnalls, J. L. (1973). The Irish on the Welland Canal. St. Catharines Public Library.

==== Eastern Ontario ====
- Hedican, Edward J. (2020). After the Famine: The Irish Family Farm in Eastern Ontario, 1851–1881. University of Toronto Press. ISBN 978-1-4875-2384-8.
- McKenzie, Ruth (1967). Leeds and Grenville: Their First 200 Years. McClelland and Stewart.

==== Southwestern Ontario ====
- Boyde, Jack (2008). On Creaking Ships. Cranberry Tree Press. ISBN 978-1-894668-32-3.
- Connon, John (1975). The Early History of Elora, Ontario and Vicinity. Wilfrid Laurier University Press. ISBN 978-0-88920-012-8.
- Godin, V. N. (2002). Petworth People: The Untold Story of the Petworth Emigrants of Oxford County. Oxford County Branch, Ontario Genealogical Society.
- McQueen, Rod; Papp, Susan M. (2012). Driven to Succeed: How Frank Hasenfratz Grew Linamar from Guelph to Global. Dundurn Press. ISBN 978-1459707955.
- Mills, John M. (1977). Traction on The Grand: The Story of Electric Railways along Ontario's Grand River Valley. Railfare Enterprises. ISBN 0-919130-27-5.

===== Grey County =====
- Croft, Melba Morris (1980). Fourth Entrance to Huronia – The History of Owen Sound.

===== Wellington County =====
- Dahms, F. A. (February 1980). "The Changing Functions of Villages and Hamlets in Wellington County, 1881–1971". Urban History Review. 8 (3). University of Toronto Press: 3–19. doi:10.7202/1019360ar. JSTOR 43561632.
- Hutchinson, Jean F. (1998). The History of Wellington County. Landsborough Printing.
- Soper, J. Dewey (November 1923). "The Mammals of Wellington and Waterloo Counties, Ontario". Journal of Mammalogy. 4 (4). American Society of Mammalogists: 244–252. doi:10.2307/1373706. JSTOR 1373706.

===== York Region =====
- Love, Ann; Bentley, Sharon M. (2025). The History of King Township: A Community Shaped by the Land. King Township Historical Society. ISBN 978-1-0691003-0-6.

== Ontario to 1869 ==
- Careless, J. M. S. Brown of the Globe (2 vols, Toronto, 1959–63), vol 1: The Voice of Upper Canada 1818–1859; vol 2: The Statesman of Confederation 1860–1880.
- Cohen, Marjorie Griffin (1988). Women's Work, Markets, and Economic Development in Nineteenth-Century Ontario. Heritage Series. University of Toronto Press. ISBN 0-8020-2651-6.
- Craig, Gerald M Upper Canada: the formative years 1784–1841 McClelland and Stewart, 1963, the standard history online edition
- Craven, Paul, ed. Labouring Lives: Work and Workers in Nineteenth-Century Ontario (University of Toronto Press, 1995)
- Dunham, Eileen Political unrest in Upper Canada 1815–1836 McClelland and Stewart, 1963.
- Errington, Jane The Lion, the Eagle, and Upper Canada: A Developing Colonial Ideology McGill-Queen's University Press, 1987.
- Errington, Elizabeth Jane (1995). Wives and Mothers, School Mistresses and Scullery Maids: Working Women in Upper Canada, 1790–1840. McGill–Queen's University Press. ISBN 978-0-7735-6544-9. JSTOR j.ctt7znj0.
- Forkey, Neil. Shaping the Upper Canadian Frontier: Environment, Society and Culture in the Trent Valley (2003)
- Gidney, R. D. and Millar, W. P. J. Professional Gentlemen: The Professions in Nineteenth-Century Ontario. U. of Toronto Press, 1994.
- Grabb, Edward, James Curtis, Douglas Baer; "Defining Moments and Recurring Myths: Comparing Canadians and Americans after the American Revolution" The Canadian Review of Sociology and Anthropology, Vol. 37, 2000
- Hoffman, Frances (1999). Across the Waters: Ontario Immigrants' Experiences, 1820–1850. Global. ISBN 1-894378-00-8.
- Johnson, J. K. and Wilson, Bruce G., eds. Historical Essays on Upper Canada: New Perspectives. Carleton U. Press, (1975). 604 pp.
- Keane, David and Read, Colin, ed. Old Ontario: Essays in Honour of J. M. S. Careless. Dundurn, 1990.
- Kilbourn, William.; The Firebrand: William Lyon Mackenzie and the Rebellion in Upper Canada (1956) online edition
- Knowles, Norman. Inventing the Loyalists: The Ontario Loyalist Tradition and the Creation of Usable Pasts. U. of Toronto Press, 1997. 244 pp.
- Landon, Fred, and J.E. Middleton. Province of Ontario: A History (1937) 4 vol. with 2 vol of history and 2 vol. of biographies
- Lewis, Frank; Urquhart, M. C. (January 1999). "Growth and the Standard of Living in a Pioneer Economy: Upper Canada, 1826 to 1851". William and Mary Quarterly. 56 (1). Omohundro Institute of Early American History and Culture: 151–181. doi:10.2307/2674598. hdl:10419/189259. JSTOR 2674598.
- McCalla, Douglas (1993). Planting the Province: The Economic History of Upper Canada 1784–1870. Ontario Historical Studies Series. University of Toronto Press. ISBN 978-0-8020-3407-6.
- McGowan, Mark G. (2005). Michael Power: The Struggle to Build the Catholic Church on the Canadian Frontier. McGill–Queen's University Press. ISBN 978-0-7735-7296-6. JSTOR j.ctt80q9d.
- McNairn, Jeffrey L The capacity to judge: public opinion and deliberative democracy in Upper Canada 1791–1854 (U of Toronto Press, 2000).
- Marks, Lynne (1996). Revivals and Roller Rinks: Religion, Leisure and Identity in Late-Nineteenth-Century Small-Town Ontario. University of Toronto Press. doi:10.3138/9781442679344. ISBN 978-1-4426-7934-4.
- Moorman, David T. "Where are the English and the Americans in the Historiography of Upper Canada?" Ontario History 88 (1996): 65–9; claims they have been deliberately left out by historians
- Munson, Marit K.; Jamieson, Susan M., eds. (2013). Before Ontario: The Archaeology of a Province. McGill–Queen's University Press. ISBN 978-0-7735-8919-3. JSTOR j.ctt32b7n5.
- Noel, S. J. R. Patrons, Clients, Brokers: Ontario Society and Politics, 1791–1896 (1990)
- Oliver, Peter. "Terror to Evil-Doers": Prisons and Punishments in Nineteenth-Century Ontario. (U. of Toronto Press, 1998). 575 pp. post 1835
- Rea, J. Edgar. "Rebellion in Upper Canada, 1837" Manitoba Historical Society Transactions Series 3, Number 22, 1965–66, historiography online edition
- Reid, Richard M. The Upper Ottawa Valley to 1855. Champlain Soc., 1990. 354 pp.
- Rogers, Edward S. and Smith, Donald B., eds. Aboriginal Ontario: Historical Perspectives on the First Nations. Dundurn, 1994. 448 pp.
- Styran, Roberta M. and Taylor, Robert R., ed. The "Great Swivel Link": Canada's Welland Canal. Champlain Soc., 2001. 494 pp.
- Westfall, William (1989). Two Worlds: The Protestant Culture of Nineteenth-Century Ontario. McGill–Queen's University Press. ISBN 978-0-7735-6181-6. JSTOR j.ctt808zj.
- Wilton, Carol. Popular Politics and Political Culture in Upper Canada, 1800–1850. McGill-Queen's University Press, (2000). 311pp

== Ontario since 1869 ==
- Abel, Kerry M. (2006). Changing Places: History, Community, and Identity in Northeastern Ontario. McGill–Queen's University Press. ISBN 978-0-7735-7598-1. JSTOR j.ctt7zt54.
- A. Brady. "The Ontario Hydro-Electric Power Commission". The Canadian Journal of Economics and Political Science. 2:3 (1936): 331–353. An account of the creation of the Ontario Hydro-Electric Power Commission.
- A. Lennox Stanton. "The Hydro-Electric Power Commission of Ontario". Journal of the Royal Society of Arts. 77:4013 (1929) 1115–1130. An examination of the social and political context of the Hydro-Electric Power Commission.
- Azoulay, Dan. Keeping the Dream Alive: The Survival of the Ontario CCF/NDP, 1950–1963. McGill-Queen's University Press, 1997. 307 pp.
- Baskerville, Peter A. (2008). A Silent Revolution?: Gender and Wealth in English Canada, 1860–1930. McGill–Queen's University Press. ISBN 978-0-7735-7445-8. JSTOR j.ctt80c7c.
- Cameron, David R. and White, Graham. Cycling into Saigon: The Conservative Transition in Ontario. University of British Columbia Press, 2000. 224 pp. Analysis of the 1995 transition from New Democratic Party (NDP) to Progressive Conservative (PC) rule in Ontario
- Campbell, Lara (2009). Respectable Citizens: Gender, Family, and Unemployment in Ontario's Great Depression. University of Toronto Press. doi:10.3138/9781442697416. ISBN 9781442697416.
- Carbert, Louise Irene (1995). Agrarian Feminism: The Politics of Ontario Farm Women. University of Toronto Press.
- Caroline Andrew. "Women and the Welfare State". Canadian Journal of Political Science 17: 4, (1984):667-683. Challenges one-sided male domination approach to studying social policy by arguing that women played an active positive role in the shift from the private sector to the welfare state in Ontario. Looks at how social and economic contexts such as industrialization, urbanization and immigration led to increase concerns and anxieties about the future of the society. The industrialization created two classes of women: working and middle class. The political discourse of the time put women in the center of family. Middle-class women followed that discourse and through their gender and class loyalty fought for improved living (and to lesser extent working) conditions of other women, and pressured for government activity. Argues that women as workers for the state had limited influence in state services; women as clients comprise the largest group of recipients whose needs were rarely meet by the state programs.
- Chenier, Elise Rose. Strangers in Our Midst: Sexual Deviancy in Post-war Ontario (2008)
- Comacchio, Cynthia R. Nations Are Built of Babies: Saving Ontario's Mothers and Children, 1900–1940. McGill-Queen's University Press, 1993. 390 pp.
- Cook, Sharon Anne. "Through Sunshine and Shadow": The Woman's Christian Temperance Union, Evangelicalism, and Reform in Ontario, 1874–1930. McGill-Queen's University Press, 1995. 281 pp.
- Christopher Armstrong, H.V. Nelles. "Private Property in Peril: Ontario Businessmen and the Federal System". The Business History Review.47:2 (1973): 1898–1911. A discussion of institutional frameworks and resource development.
- Darroch, Gordon and Soltow, Lee. Property and Inequality in Victorian Ontario: Structural Patterns and Cultural Communities in the 1871 Census. University of Toronto Press, 1994. 280 pp.
- Devlin, John F. "A Catalytic State? Agricultural Policy in Ontario, 1791–2001." PhD dissertation U. of Guelph 2004. 270 pp. DAI 2005 65(10): 3972-A. DANQ94970 Fulltext: in ProQuest Dissertations & Theses
- Rand Dyck. "The provincial perspectives." Canadian Annual Review of Politics and Public Affairs 1990. Edited by David Leyton-Brown. University of Toronto Press, 1997. The Canadian Annual Review of Politics and Public Policy provides a general outline the major political events that took place in provincial politics in 1990.
- E. B. Biggar. "The Ontario Power Commission: Its Origin and Development". Journal of Political Economy. 29:1 (1921): 29–54. An account of the creation of the Ontario Power Commission.
- Evans, A. Margaret. Sir Oliver Mowat. University of Toronto Press, 1992. 438 pp. Premier 1872–1896
- Fleming, Keith R. Power at Cost: Ontario Hydro and Rural Electrification, 1911–1958. McGill-Queen's University Press, 1992. 326 pp.
- Pierre Fortin. "The Great Canadian Slump." Canadian Journal of Economics / /Revue canadienne d'économique. 29:4 (1996):761-787. This article in the Canadian Journal of Economics explains the effects of the recession in the early 1990s.
- Fred P. Morrissey. "An Appraisal of the Hydro-Electric Power Commission of Ontario". Land Economics. 27:1 (1951) 49–57. An examination of the financial aspects and implications of the Hydro-Electric Power Commission.
- Gidney, R. D. From Hope to Harris: The Reshaping of Ontario's Schools. University of Toronto Press, 1999. 362 pp. deals with debates and changes in education from 1950 to 2000
- Gidney, Robert Douglas; Millar, Winnifred Phoebe Joyce (1990). Inventing Secondary Education: The Rise of the High School in Nineteenth-Century Ontario. McGill–Queen's University Press. ISBN 978-0-7735-6239-4. JSTOR j.ctt808v6.
- Halpern, Monda (2001). And on that Farm He Had a Wife: Ontario Farm Women and Feminism, 1900–1970. McGill–Queen's University Press. ISBN 978-0-7735-2185-8.
- Harold S. Patton. "Hydro-Electric Power Policies in Ontario and Quebec". The Journal of Land & Public Utility Economics. 3:2 (1927) 132–144. A discussion of the initial motives behind the establishment of the hydro-electric power policies of Ontario and Quebec.
- Jim Henderson. "The 1990 Ontario Election: Lessons for Canadians." Canadian Parliamentary Review. 14:1 (1991):24-25. This article explains David Peterson's loss in popularity leading up to the 1990 election.
- Hines, Henry G. East of Adelaide: Photographs of Commercial, Industrial and Working-Class Urban Ontario, 1905–1930. London Regional Art and History Museum, 1989.
- Hodgetts, J. E. From Arm's Length to Hands-On: The Formative Years of Ontario's Public Service, 1867–1940. University of Toronto Press, 1995. 296 pp.
- Irene M. Biss. "The Contracts of the Hydro-Electric Power Commission of Ontario". The Economic Journal. 46:183 (1936): 549–554. Examines the contracts within the Hydro-Electric Power Commission of Ontario.
- James Struthers."The limits of affluence: Welfare in Ontario, 1920–1970". University of Toronto Press, 1994. Argues that the concept of motherhood was central in creating Ontario welfare state. Highlights the important role leaders of the orphanages and child welfare advocates played in creation of OMA, (such as Kelso and Bryce). Overcrowding and high death rates were prominent within these institutions, while poverty pushed many working mothers to give their children away. World War I provided political context for mobilizing government, as new citizens were needed. While Canadian Patriotic Fund served as a guideline for OMA, characterized by strict supervision, work with local communities and absence of stigma of charity. Out of moral concerns, women leaders were the most forceful advocates to limit financial assistance to widows only. After implementation, municipalities and counties were responsible for half of the cost so they had some influence on OMA Commission. However, the commission only considered their advice on the matters of potential "unworthiness" of the client. Justified in the interests of the children and rhetoric of motherhood as a service to the state, the program was never sufficient to alleviate poverty for even most deserving mothers, subordinating women only further by constant surveillance and threat.
- John Ibbitson. Promised Land: Inside the Mike Harris Revolution. Prentice-Hall, 1997. Tracks the political ascent of Harris, the beginnings of the neo-liberal revolution that was beginning within the Tories that allowed Harris to beat out the more moderate members for the leadership, and how those ideologies became popular in reaction to the Rae government.
- Karl Froschauer. "Ontario's Niagara Falls, 1887–1929: Reversing the Privatization of Hydro". Journal of Canadian Studies. 39:3(2005): 60–84. Examines the issues which led to the reversing of privatized hydro.
- Kechnie, Margaret C. (2003). Organizing Rural Women: The Federated Women's Institutes of Ontario, 1897–1919. McGill–Queen's University Press. ISBN 978-0-7735-2604-4. JSTOR j.ctt7zwfj.
- Keil, Roger. ""Common-Sense"Neoliberalism: Progressive Conservative Urbanism in Toronto, Canada." Antipode.(2002): 578–598. Surmises how Toronto neo-liberalism affected the Harris government
- Keith R. Fleming. "Power at Cost: Ontario Hydro and Rural Electrification, 1911–1958". McGill-Queen's University Press, 1992. A study on the development of the HEPC inrural Ontario.
- Thomas Klassen and Dan Buchanan. "Ideology, Policy and Economy: Liberal, New Democratic and Conservative Reforms to Ontario's Welfare Program." Journal of Canadian Studies. 40:3 (2006):186-210. This article analyzes the changes in Ontario's welfare policies under the Liberal, New Democratic and Conservatives governments since 1985.
- Kozolanka, Kirsten. The Power of Persuasion: The Politics of the New Right in Ontario (2006)
- Krajnc, Anita. "Wither Ontario's Environment? Neo-Conservatism and the Decline of the Environment Ministry." Canadian Public Policy. 26.1 (2000): 111–127. The article provides a treatment of environmental policy reform resulting from the Common Sense Revolution but focuses specifically on the budget cuts to the Ontario Ministry of Environment. It attempts to track the level of funding and staffing since the MOE's inception in the 1970s, reviews the impacts of the cuts that occurred in the mid-90s, and theorizes which forces were the most pervasive in causing its decline. Though the article examines the effect of party politics, public pressures, and other socio-political forces, it concludes that the primary cause of the decline was the ideology underlying the Common Sense Revolution. This article concerns itself with "neo-conservatism" instead of the "neo-liberalism" mentioned by Olakanmi, Prudham, Little, etc. The Common Sense Revolution resulted in far-reaching changes to traditional environmental policy and the primary mobilizing factor was this ideology.
- Kushner, Joseph, and David Siegel."Citizen's Attitudes Toward Municipal Amalgamation in Three Ontario Municipalities." Canadian Journal of Regional Science. 26.1(2003): 49–59. Examines the results of Toronto Amalgamation.
- Landon, Fred, and J.E. Middleton. Province of Ontario: A History (1937) 4 vol. with 2 vol of biographies
- Little, Margaret. "A Closer Look at the Neo-Liberal Petri Dish: Welfare Reform in British Columbia and Ontario." Canadian Review of Social Policy. 57. (2006): 16–45. The article compares and contrasts the instances of neo-liberal governments in British Columbia and Ontario and their respective approaches towards welfare policy. Though the article is not specifically focused on whether or not the Common Sense Revolution was a break from tradition, it does provide pertinent information. It notes that, the emphasis on "workfare" was an ideological and philosophical approach to welfare policy that was brand new to Ontario. In addition, the obsession with welfare fraud prevention was a significant change to past practices. The article notes the almost impossible amount of detail required to prove need and emphasizes that the moral element of making certain that no one could gain the system was also new to Ontario policy-making. The article concludes that Common Sense Revolution did not only feature a new ideological approach to Ontario politics but also represented a stricter form of moral policing especially with regard to welfare policy.
- MacDermid, Robert. "TV Advertising in the 1995 Ontario Election." Revolution at Queen's Park: Essays on Governing Ontario. Ed. Sid Noel. J Lorimer, 1997., pp. 1–17. Argues that the planning that the Tories took on for the implementation of their advertising campaign laid the groundwork fortheir victory.
- Manthorpe, Jonathan. The power & the Tories: Ontario politics, 1943 to the present (1974)
- Margaret Little. "The Blurring of Boundaries: Private and Public Welfare for Single Mothers in Ontario". Studies in Political Economy: 47:07 (1995): 89-109. Argues that Ontario state policies grew out of private welfare activities and at the early stage even relied on the private agencies to help the government in administration of the OMA. States that, while liberal democratic states adhere to strict division between private and public realms and do not interfere with the former, Ontario government with the help and active participation of voluntary organizations facilitated in internalization of the maternal ideology by the citizens. This allowed government to control the impoverished women, by relaying on the opinions and experience of organizations such as Children's Aid Society, National Council of Women and Toronto Local Council of Women in administering and delivering state services.
- Little, Margaret Jane Hillyard (1998). 'No Car, No Radio, No Liquor Permit': The Moral Regulation of Single Mothers in Ontario, 1920–1997. Oxford University Press. ISBN 0-19-541150-1. Provides in-depth account of moral regulations of OMA recipients. Traces the origins of the program, its implementation and administration. Argues that it was created with the classist, racist, gendered ideology of the middle-class men and women. Looks at the role of maternal ideology in debates around mother's allowance. In contrast to Andrew, argues that women had influence in the administration of the state policy. The U.S. and Canadian provinces already had a similar policy in action. Women could vote for the first time, so Drury's Conservative government wanted to secure that vote by implementing mother's allowance. State took responsibility of moral control of its citizens by strict eligibility criteria of the OMA. While some aspects of the welfare state became routinized and bureaucratized, it remained to be highly subjective. Sexual life, personal hygiene, housekeeping, race/ethnicity of the applicants were under scrutiny by the citizens and the government officials. At the same time, family violence and women's health were rarely considered.
- Marks, Lynne (1996). Revivals and Roller Rinks: Religion, Leisure and Identity in Late-Nineteenth-Century Small-Town Ontario. University of Toronto Press. doi:10.3138/9781442679344. ISBN 978-1-4426-7934-4.
- Merrill Denison. "The People's Power; the History of Ontario Hydro". McClelland & Stewart Limited, 1960. Looks at public ownership of hydroelectric power in Ontario.
- Montgomery, Byron. "The common (non)sense revolution : the decline of progress and democracy in Ontario". Mad River Publishing, 2002. The book provides a highly detailed and critical treatment of the Common Sense Revolution and the magnitude of its reforms across many policy areas including public education, healthcare, etc. The writing on healthcare is timely given the Harris government's promise that there would be no cuts to it and the author's explanation of the Health Services Restructuring Commission. The book concludes by accusing the Revolution and its supporters of attempting to weaken government such that it was incapable of exerting influence; that Mike Harris and his supporters did not govern for the people and changed too much too quickly.
- Montigny, Edgar-Andre, and Lori Chambers, eds. Ontario since Confederation: A Reader (University of Toronto Press, 2000).
- Moss, Mark. Manliness and Militarism: Educating Young Boys in Ontario for War. (Oxford University Press, 2001). 216 pp.
- Neatby, H. Blair; McEown, Don (2002). Creating Carleton: The Shaping of a University. McGill–Queen's University Press. ISBN 978-0-7735-7075-7. JSTOR j.ctt130hhjn.
- Neil B. Freeman. "The Politics of Power: Ontario Hydro and Its Government 1906–1995". University of Toronto Press, 1996. Examines the relationship between the government and the Ontario Hydro-Electric Power Commission.
- Neil B. Freeman. "The Politics of Power: Ontario Hydro and its Government 1906–1995". University of Toronto Press, 1996. Outlines the relationship between Ontario Hydro and the provincial government.
- Nesbitt-Larking, Paul. "Political Psychology in Canada". Political Psychology. 25.1 (2004): 97–114. Defines and compares Canadian political psychology.
- Christopher Olakanmi. "Disaster Capitalism and the Common Sense Revolution: Taking Stock of the Residual Crisis in Ontario's Public Schools." Our Schools, Our Selves. 17:3 (2008): 61–71. Examines the motivation and long-term results of the Common Sense Revolution on Ontario public Schools.
- Olakanmi, Christopher. "Disaster Capitalism and the Common Sense Revolution: Taking Stock of the Residual Crisis in Ontario's Public Schools." Our Schools, Ourselves. 17.3 (2008): 67–71. This article examines the effects that the Common Sense Revolution had on several social institutions including the public education system. The article notes the neo-liberal foundations of the Revolution and that Mike Harris deliberately promoted "disaster capitalism" to impact policy. Particular emphasis is placed on the effect of neo-liberal doctrines and thinkers on the large-scale changes that occurred with regards to public education policy. The article is critical of the changes and argues that neo-liberal ideology has damaged unions, the school boards, and led to dramatic underfunding; it concludes, however, that a change in ideology could see positive reforms to public education. Examines the effect of the CSR on Ontario's public school system, a decade after it was implemented. While most PC policies were neo-liberal (which generally holds that education should be as privatized as possible, albeit with government funding), their approach to education involved more regulation of schools, including administrative, curricular, and working conditions, while reducing the amount of money spend. This could be considered an attempt to reduce the power of public unions, of which teachers are among the most visible and influential. "Consequently, it carried out a strategic plan to undermine the authority, knowledge, and integrity of those within the education system in order to further its agenda.
- Ontario Bureau of Statistics and Research. A Conspectus of the Province of Ontario (1947) online edition
- Jerry Paquette. "Cross-purposes and crossed wires in education policymaking on equity: The Ontario experiences, 1990–1995." Journal of Curriculum Studies. 33:1 (2001):89-112. In his article Jerry Paquette examines the NDP government from 1990 to 1995 in regards to its education policy.
- Parr, Joy, ed. (1995). A Diversity of Women: Ontario, 1945–1980. University of Toronto Press. OCLC 31780966.
- W.R. Plewman. "Adam Beck and the Ontario Hydro". The Ryerson Press, 1947. A description of Adam Beck's roll in various Ontarian governments.
- Prudham, Scott. "Poisoning the well: neoliberalism and the contamination of municipal water in Walkerton, Ontario." Geoforum. 35.3 (2004): 343–359. This article places its emphasis on Common Sense Revolution environmental policy and explores the Walkerton Tragedy within the context of this policy. Justification for this focus is provided through the article's showing that much of the Revolution was nature-centered. Though the Harris cuts were building on the cuts by the Rae government, they went far deeper and damaged many core programs; in addition, the Harris cuts were motivated primarily by an ideology that was new to Ontario governance. The combination of policy like the Red Tape Reduction Bill with the immense cuts and the rhetorical attacks against the public sector produced a never-before-seen devolution in environmental oversight. The article concludes by reiterating that the Common Sense Revolution directly gave rise to the conditions that allowed the Walkerton Tragedy to occur.
- Ralph, Diana; Régimbald, André; and St-Amand, Nérée, eds. Open for Business, Closed for People: Mike Harris's Ontario. Fernwood, 1997. 207 pp.
- Ralph, Diana, Andre Regimbald, and Neree St. Amand. Open for business: closed to people: Mike Harris's Ontario. Fernwood Publishing, 1997. The book provides a chronological overview of key events during the Common Sense Revolution as well as contextual explanations for these events. The authors argue throughout that there was a multinational, corporate agenda underlying Mike Harris' policies; a factor that had never been so pronounced in Ontario policymaking. Although the book touches on similar subjects to the other presented sources, it also offers unique points. For example, it notes that, there has been a tradition in Ontario of legislation combatting racism and anti-Semitism since the 40s, but that the Common Sense Revolution represented a break from this due to the elimination of various pieces of equity legislation. The book ultimately argues that the underlying sociology of the Revolution and its emphasis on a new, business-like model of government produced massive changes in many different parts of Ontario policymaking. Examines how the CSR was designed by, and heavily favours, corporations instead of people. Discusses, in three sections, the routes of the revolution in Thatcherism and American conservatism; the impact it has had on the province including social programs, Franco-Ontarians, and labour organizations; and ways in which opponents can respond to the government.
- Reginald Pelham Bolton. "An Expensive Experiment: The Hydro-Electric Power Commission of Ontario". The Baker & Taylor Company, 1913. An examination of public rights and resource development in Canada.
- Roberts, David (2006). In the Shadow of Detroit: Gordon M. McGregor, Ford of Canada, and Motoropolis. Wayne State University Press. ISBN 978-0-8143-3284-9.
- Royal Commission on Electrical Power Planning. "The Report of the Royal Commission on Electric Power Planning". The Royal Commission on Electric Power Planning, 1980. A commission produced report explaining the goals and criteria of the Hydro-Electric Power Commission of Ontario.
- Santink, Joy L. (1990). Timothy Eaton and the Rise of His Department Store. University of Toronto Press. ISBN 978-1-4875-8010-0. JSTOR 10.3138/j.ctvfrxpgz.
- Saywell, John T. "Just Call Me Mitch": The Life of Mitchell F. Hepburn. U. of Toronto Press, 1991. 637 pp. Biography of Liberal premier 1934–1942
- Schryer, Frans J. (February 1998). The Netherlandic Presence in Ontario: Pillars, Class and Dutch Ethnicity. Wilfrid Laurier University Press. ISBN 978-0-88920-312-9. Focus is on post-WWII.
- Schull, Joseph. Ontario since 1867 (1978), narrative history
- S. Conway. "The Politics of Electricity in Ontario". Current Affairs:Perspectives on Electricity Policy for Ontario. Edited by D. Reeve, D.N. Dewees, & B. Karney. University of Toronto Press, 2010. A short chapter regarding hydro-electric power and Ontario's political culture.
- Smith, Edward. "Working-Class Anglicans: Religion and Identity in Victorian and Edwardian Hamilton, Ontario," Social History/Histoire Sociale, 2003 online edition
- Stagni, Pellegrino. The View from Rome: Archbishop Stagni's 1915 Reports on the Ontario Bilingual Schools Question McGill-Queen's University Press, 2002. 134 pp.
- Warecki, George M. Protecting Ontario's Wilderness: A History of Changing Ideas and Preservation Politics, 1927–1973. Lang, 2000. 334 pp.
- White, Graham, ed. The Government and Politics of Ontario. 5th ed. University of Toronto Press, 1997. 458 pp.
- White, Randall. Ontario since 1985. Eastendbooks, 1998. 320 pp.
- Wilson, Barbara M. ed. Ontario and the First World War, 1914–1918: A Collection of Documents (Champlain Society, 1977)
- Winfield, Mark, and Greg Jenish. "Ontario's Environment and the "Common Sense Revolution". Studies in Political Economy. 57. (1998): 129–147. An overview of the effect that the "Common Sense Revolution" has had on environmental protection and natural resource policy in Ontario. Particular emphasis is placed on the numerous provincial statute amendments, the sharp reductions in budget, and the governmental restructuring that occurred. The article is critical of the changes propagated by the Revolution and concludes that it has reversed two long-standing traditions of Ontario policy; dedication to environmental protection and resource conservation, and reduction of economic reliance on natural resource mining.
- D, Gagan. "For patients of moderate means: a social history of the voluntary public general hospital in Canada 1890–1950". McGill-Queen's University Press, 2002
- N, Hillmer. "Pearson the unlikely gladiator". McGill-Queen's University Press, 1999
- D, Naylor. "Canadian health care and the states: a century of evolution". McGill-Queen's University Press, 1992
- K.C, Harvey. "Ontario Health Insurance Plan". British Medical Journal, 1978
- R, Graham. "Old man Ontario: Leslie M. Frost". University of Toronto Press for the Ontario Historical Studies Series, 1990
- C.D, Naylor. "Private practice, public payment: Canadian medicine and the politics of health insurance, 1911–1966". McGill-Queen's University Press, 1986

=== Recent politics ===
- Christina Blizzard, Right Turn: How the Tories took Ontario. (Dundurn Press, 1995.) An account of the 1995 Ontario Provincial election and the Progressive-Conservative Party's rise to power, with a focus on the re-branding of the Ontario PC party under the party leadership of Mike Harris and the impact of the Common Sense Revolution campaign platform. The account details the unique circumstances in Ontario which enabled the OntarioPC party to rise from a third party and seize majority government victory.
- John Ibbitson. Promised Land: Inside the Mike Harris Revolution (Prentice Hall Canada Inc, 1997.) Promised Land is divided into two parts with the first being an examination of how the Common Sense Revolution was constructed and the people involved in its conception. Attention is put on the evolution of the Ontario PC Party under Mike Harris's leadership and the influences and circumstances which became responsible for the policies outlined in the CommonSense Revolution. The second part of Promised Land examines the Ontario PC Party after they had one majority government in 1995 with attention on the consequences of instituting the CommonSense Revolution in Ontario and the impact it had on various segments of society. Focus is put on the protest by certain segments of society, such as labour and the teachers union, towards the policies introduced by the Harris government and how the government confronted and overcame these challenges.
- Rosemary Speirs. Out of the Blue: The Fall of the Tory Dynasty in Ontario (Macmillan, 1986.) An examination of the decline of the Progressive-Conservative party in Ontario and an analysis of the party's fall from power beginning with the resignation of Bill Davis in 1985 and his government's defeat in the 1985 election subsequently giving way to the emergence of David Peterson's Liberal government. Attention is put on how the Ontario PC Party managed itself in those wilderness years as the Liberals and NDP increasingly seized and divided political control of Ontario. Further analysis covers the party's innerdivisiveness as it struggled to reinvent itself and renew its position within Ontario politics.
- Sid Noel, ed. Revolution at Queens Park: Essays on Governing Ontario (James Lorimer and Company, 1997). A collection of essays examining the dramatic political shift Ontario has experienced since 1985 by putting attention on the 1995 election and the circumstances which resulted in a "revolution in Queens Park" via Mike Harris's conservative government winning a majority. The essays present new perspectives on how aspects of the election such as media, political culture as well as economics played a crucial role in determining the results.

=== Bob Rae ===
- Bob Rae. "From Protest to Power: Personal Reflections on a life in politics". Penguin Book Ltd, 1996. This is a book written as an autobiography by Bob Rae outlining his life in politics. The book starts off with an introduction briefly describing Mr. Rae's first year as premier. Throughout the book he discusses the trials and tribulations that he had to endure and overcome as premier, including the recession in Ontario in the late 1980s and early 1990s, his party politics, and issues with Quebec independence sentiments. The book discusses how Bob Rae got into politics and a brief history of his childhood. Rae goes through each of his elections in the 80s and 90s. He describes the outcomes of each election and the consequence that it had on his life on the path to becoming in NDP Premier in Ontario for the years of 1990 to 95. The book continues to talk about the many major and minor mistakes that his party had made throughout his leadership, such as party members "losing their cool" in parliament or getting a staff member to sign a document on a cabinet member's behalf. The book concludes with Bob Rae talking about how he lost his premier seat to Mike Harris and his congratulation speech.
- Thomas Walkom. "Rae Days". Key Porter book Ltd, 1994. A look at the political history of Bob Rae while he was the NDP Premier of Ontario. The book discusses the social reforms under taken by the Rae government, along with other policy changes, such as the auto insurance issue. The book continues to describe Bob Rae as a leader and the decisions he made with his party. Most of these decisions were said by critics to have been Rae's downfall and the NDP's dramatic fall in popularity with the population. The book quickly discusses Rae's personal life as well and describes him as "a liberal in sandals". The book continues to discuss personal and political events through the NDP party starting from winning on election night in 1990.
- Bob Rae. "Lessons to be learned: the report of the Honourable Bob Rae, independent advisor to the minister of public safety and emergency preparedness, on outstanding questions with respect to the bombing of Air India Flight 182". Air India Review Secretariat. Her majesty the Queen in Right of Canada, 2005. This report is a policy-based inquiry into the event of the Air India Flight 182 bombing. The report is written by Bob Rae and takes into consideration the inquiries of the public with respect to the bombing. The report discusses the terrorist group that was behind the bombing and how the bombings took place. The report then goes on to discuss the outcome of the trials for the people responsible for the bombing. A brief history and background outlines a brief history on the turmoils of the Sikh population in Canada and in India and why the Sikh population had wanted to assert themselves as an independent state. There was also an overview as to what the Canadian government should do to correct the situation and to put in place certain policies and procedures. Rae questions the government as to why the events of 9/11 was the catalyst to bringing forth the Anti-Terrorism act instead of the Air India Act that directly affected many Canadian lives on Canadian soil. The report ends off by Rae explaining that further review should be held for questions that still have no answer, for example was the assessment by Canadian government officials in the potential threat of Sikh terrorism in the period prior to 1985 adequate in light of the information reasonably available at the time even though the government received numerous warnings of the activities of this terrorist group. This book is a good review of national security policies and procedures and changes that should occur to the Canadian government.
- Paul Kaihla. "Rating Bob Rae." Maclean's. Volume 104: Issue 34 (1991): 14. This article is a brief overview of the first year of Rae's achievements and setbacks as Premier of Ontario. This is a brief overview of Rae's role in government and how Ontario has changed for the better or worse. Many of the citizens interviewed in the article state that they are still waiting on improvements that were promised to them in the social service sector. The article discusses the slow pace of change and the people's hopes and dreams for change in policies before Rae was elected. So far nothing has come forth yet. The author has stated that Rae has yet to make good on his word to be a more involved politician. Some of the strides made by Rae in politics have been the signing of the letter of agreement stating that the First nation residents shall possess an inherent right to self-government, a first declaration ever made by any Ontario Premier. The article continues to discuss the implications of the recession for the Ontario economy with the lack of jobs that were supposed to be created under the Rae government. The article continues to describe the conflicts in inter party politics and the debate on the auto insurance issue of scrapping the no fault auto insurance plan.
- Paul Kaihla and Ross Laver. "Bob Rae's Revolution" Maclean's. Volume 105: Issue 37 (1992):20 – 24 This article is about the social reform changes that the Rae government had made or tried to make during their rule. The policies that were made during the Rae government that affected social aspects of Ontario were the Consent to treatment act which gave permission to children aged 12 and over to refuse medical treatment without parental consent, a very progressive labour legislation that would make private companies throughout Ontario hire visible minorities, women and disabled people. The article emphasizes the Rae party's policies to change deep-seated social injustices in Ontario. The article continues to discuss other policies in the labour field and the educational field. The article concludes with the author discussing Rae's commitment to fighting social injustices and changing the power balance in Ontario to giving power to less advantaged people according to race and gender.
- Martinello, Felice (2000). "Mr. Harris, Mr. Rae and Union Activity in Ontario". Canadian Public Policy. 26 (1). University of Toronto Press: 17–33. doi:10.2307/3552254. ISSN 1911-9917. JSTOR 3552254. A comparison between Bob Rae's NDP government and Mike Harris's PC government and their policy attitudes towards organized labour in Ontario. A decade of data ranging from 1987 to 1998 is used to compare the effects of government change over which note the contrasting certification/decertification activity as well as number of complaints regarding unfair labour practices and focus is put on how these issues were significantly impacted with the election of the Ontario PC government in 1995 and remained in sharp contrast throughout the Harris years. The study the article examines is a reflection of left-right party positions on organized labour which became a major issue of Mike Harris's terms in government.

=== Mike Harris ===
- Blizzard, Christina. "Right Turn: How the Tories Took Ontario." Toronto: Dundurn Press, 1995. An in-depth review by a former Toronto Sun reporter on Mike Harris's rise to power in the 1995 election and particularly important issues during the campaign. Argues that Harris did not have any kind of secret American election formula, but instead responded to polling and the fears of Ontarians.
- Bradford, Neil. "Public-Private Partnership? Shifting Paradigms of Economic Governance in Ontario." Canadian Journal of Political Science. 36.5 (2003): 1005–1033. Print. Compares economic differences between Harris and Raegov ernments.
- Clarkson, Stephen. "Paradigm Shift or Political Correction? Putting Ontario's 'Common Sense Revolution' in a Global Context." Regional and Federal Studies 9.3 (1999): 81-106. An analysis of whether the CSR constitutes a temporary 'correction' to the nature of regional government and economic planning, or if the CSR is a permanent change that would fundamentally alter it. A global trend shows regional level of governments attaining greater economic control away from the national level. Harris fought for greater provincial autonomy, but was disinterested in representing Ontario on a global level and was more inward looking than his predecessors across the spectrum. PC policies such as "the best creation program is a tax cut" have both distinctly neo-liberal and Keynesian characteristics.
- Downey, Terrence J. "Provincial Agendas, Local Responses: The 'Common Sense' Restructuring of Ontario's Municipal Governments." Canadian Public Administration. 41:2 (1998): 210–238. A study on the results of the PC proposals to restructure six municipalities in southern Ontario. 'Restructuring' has turned a simplistic process of amalgamation and eliminating the new redundancies, and the provincial government failed to adequately work with municipalities, instead implementing some proposals unilaterally. Questions Harris claim that restructuring local government could have an effect on local growth, as if the design of the bureaucracy is more substantial than its policies. The actual implementation of some parts of the plan was forced upon municipalities to take on themselves, and there were varying response ranging from compliance to outright resistance.
- Duchesne, Scott. "Mike the Message: Performing the Common Sense Revolution." Theatre Research in Canada. 20:1 (1999). The article examines the political dimension of how the Common Sense Revolution was promoted and enacted. Particular emphasis is placed on Mike Harris as the catalyst of the reforms and the positive and negative feedback that he and his party received as a result. The article focuses on in-depth analysis of Conservative propaganda commercials and provides insight into how certain wide-scale reforms that diverged from tradition were seemingly accepted by the Ontario population and why policies like Bill 103 were so stringently opposed. The article concludes by noting that Harris' image may have been more damaging to the Revolution than his far-reaching changes to the Ontario policy tradition.
- Felice Martinello. "Mr. Harris, Mr. Rae and Union Activity in Ontario." Canadian Public Policy. 26: 1 (2000):17–33.
- Rapaport, David. No Justice, No Peace: The 1996 OPSEU Strike Against the Harris Government in Ontario (McGill-Queen's Press – MQUP, 1999)
- White, Graham. "The Government and Politics of Ontario". University of Toronto Press, 1997.

== Media ==
- Bausenhart, Werner A. (1972). "The Ontario German Language Press and Its Suppression by Order-in-Council in 1918". Canadian Ethnic Studies. 4 (1–2): 35–48. ISSN 0008-3496.
- Careless, J. M. S. Brown of the Globe (2 vols, 1959–63), vol 1: The Voice of Upper Canada 1818–1859; vol 2: The Statesman of Confederation 1860–1880.
- Kalbfleisch, Herbert Karl (1968). The History of the Pioneer German Language Press of Ontario, 1835–1918. University of Toronto Press. ISBN 978-1-4875-8906-6.

== Primary sources ==
- Baskerville, Peter, ed. The Upper Ottawa Valley to 1855: A collection of documents (1990)

== See also ==
- Bibliography of Canada
- Bibliography of Canadian history
- Bibliography of Nova Scotia
- Bibliography of Alberta history
- Bibliography of British Columbia
- Bibliography of the 1837–38 insurrections in Lower Canada
- List of books about the War of 1812
