= Alain-G. Gagnon =

President of the Royal Society of Canada

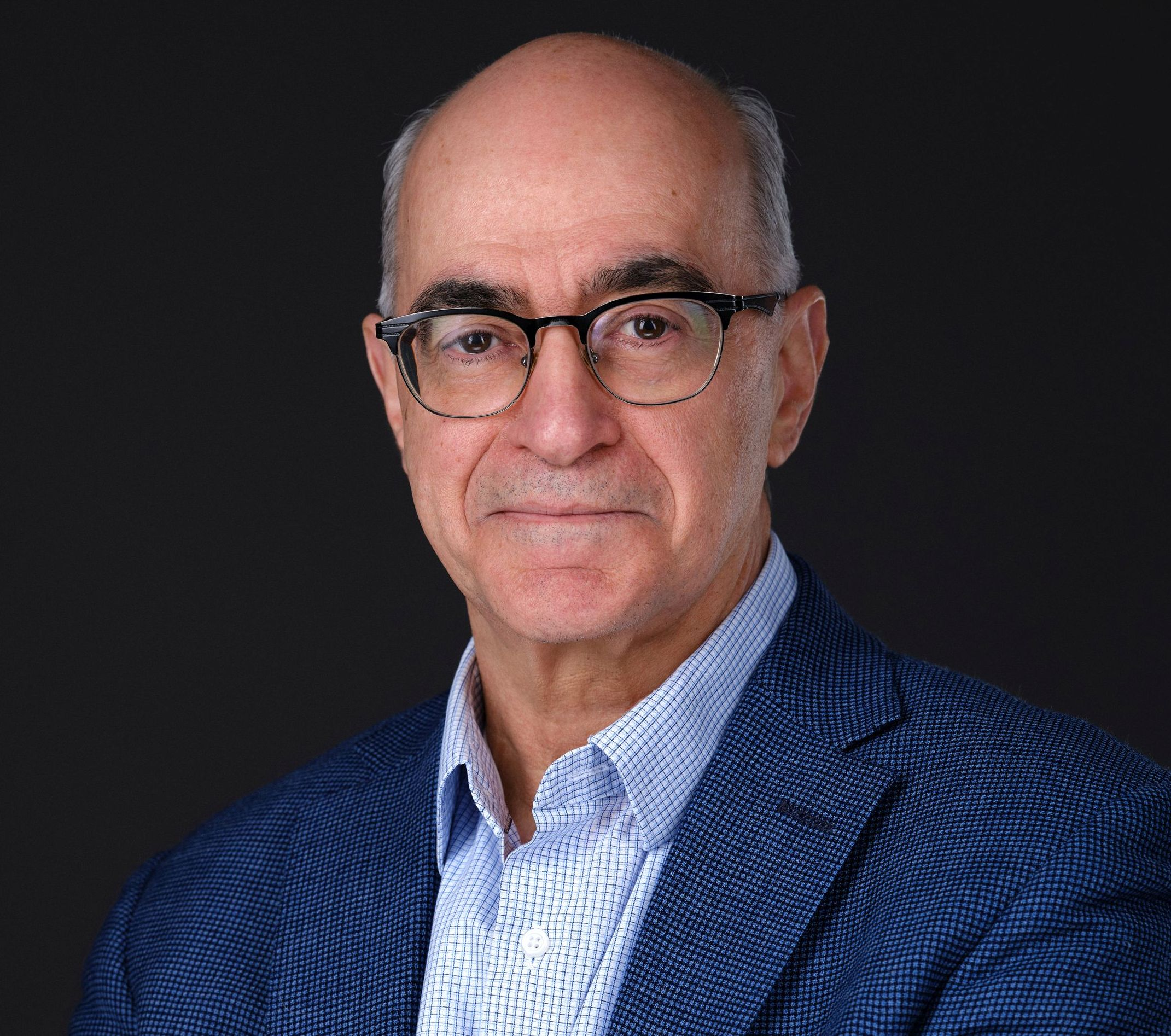
Royal Society of Canada President Alain-G. Gagnon

Alain-G. Gagnon OC CQ CRC (born 1954) is a Montreal-based scholar who serves as President of the Royal Society of Canada and Vice-President of the International Association of Centers of Federal Studies. Since the 1980s, when he published his first major academic works, Gagnon has been an active participant in debates surrounding the constitutional status of Québec amid struggles for sovereignty and negotiations to reform Canada's federal system. He is a well established figure in the study of Québec and Canada and in the theorization of contested systems of national recognition.

Gagnon has held visiting professorships at a number of European institutions, including the Universitat Autònoma de Barcelona, the Universidad Carlos III de Madrid, Sciences Po Paris, Sciences Po Bordeaux, and the Université Sorbonne Nouvelle. But he is principally based in Montreal. He served as Director of the Quebec Studies Program at McGill University from 1992 until 2003, when he joined the Political Science Department of the Université du Québec à Montréal. At UQAM he holds the Canada Research Chair in Québec and Canadian Studies. "Using a comparative approach that draws on theories and concepts from political science, law, sociology and history, Gagnon and his team are analyzing how these phenomena affect intercommunity dynamics and cohesion in the context of relationships between citizens and their institutions."

A significant figure in the internationalization of research partnerships in Québec, Gagnon is well known for institution-building in his fields of publication and study. In 2018, he founded a research centre at UQAM focused on the study of constitutional politics and federalism. Other Montreal-based research centers that Gagnon has led include the Centre for Interdisciplinary Research on Diversity and Democracy (CRIDAQ) and the Research Group on Plurinational Societies (GRSP), which he helped to establish in 1993.

The Royal Society of Canada reviews Gagnon's academic profile as follows:

Translated into some twenty languages, his work has earned him several distinctions, including the Prix Marcel-Vincent from the Association francophone pour le savoir (ACFAS, 2007), the 2008 Award of Excellence and the 2019 Teaching Award from the Société québécoise de science politique, the Governor General's International Award in Canadian Studies (2016), the Ordre de Pléiade (Ordre de la francophonie et du dialogue des cultures) (2018), and the Mildred A. Schwartz Lifetime Achievement Award from the American Political Science Association (2020). He was appointed Officer of the Order of Canada in 2019 and Member of the Order of Quebec in 2022.

An autumn 2023 colloquium was organized in Montreal to recognize and take stock of the scope of Gagnon's influence.

== Biography ==
Born in Saint-Gabriel, Québec (now Saint-Gabriel-de-Rimouski), Gagnon completed his first university degree from the Université du Québec à Rimouski. According to a leading Canadian research institution, his scholarship arose from interest in

a politics of empowerment for communities in need of dignity. From his early work on multinational federalism, Gagnon has consistently advocated for the advent of a democracy the feeds justice. The decolonization movement in Africa and Asia, the Maritime Rights Movement, and – closer to home – Quebec's nationalist movement and First Nations' claims for recognition are some of the elements that have aroused Gagnon's concern for regional and cultural circumstances.

Alongside continued engagement with local constitutional debates, Gagnon has sometimes lent his name to petitions and other forms of advocacy, including as concerns alleged violations of the rights of unrecognized or oppressed nationalities (e.g. Catalans and Palestinians). But his main activities have been scholarly. "His multidisciplinary work spans a range of analytical fields," the Royal Society of Canada records, "from regional development to the sociology of intellectuals, from political economy to federalism and nationalism."

Gagnon is a graduate of UQAR, Simon Fraser University, and Carleton University.

Since the original publication in 1984 of his first major edited volume, Québec: State & Society, Gagnon has established himself as a prolific scholar. Alongside contributions to pertinent trade journals, such as the Canadian Journal of Political Science / Revue Canadienne de science politique, Gagnon has published with the university presses of McGill-Queen's, Québec, Montréal, Laval, Toronto, UBC, Oxford, Cambridge, Edinburgh, and Tokyo, as well as with academic publishers including Peter Lang and Palgrave MacMillan. A fuller list can be found on his faculty web page.
