= Concordia University Press =

Academic publisher

- Parent company: Concordia University
- Founded: 2016
- Country of origin: Montreal, Quebec, Canada
- Distribution: University of British Columbia Press (English titles); Presses de l'Université de Montréal (French titles); University of Chicago Press (United States)
- Publication types: Books
- Official website: concordia.ca/press.html

Concordia University Press is a university press associated with Concordia University, located in Montreal, Canada. The press, which was organized by the university's library before being incorporated as its own entity, issues books in both English and French.

While formally founded in October 2016, Concordia University Press can trace its origin back to the university's 2012-2016 Academic Plan, which called for the creation of "innovative knowledge dissemination platforms, like an electronic press at Concordia". One of Concordia University's librarians had experience in journal publishing and was thus able to help spearhead this initiative and see it through to fruition.

Concordia University Press is a member of the Association of Canadian University Presses and the Association of Canadian Publishers, and an affiliate of the Association of University Presses.

== See also ==
- List of English-language book publishing companies
- List of university presses
