= Bob W. White =

Canadian anthropologist

Bob W. White is a full professor of social anthropology at the University of Montreal, Quebec, Canada. He is an expert in the Council of Europe's Intercultural Cities program and the director and founder of the Laboratory for Research on Intercultural Relations (LABRRI) at the University of Montreal. His research interests include intercultural communication, dynamics, and cities; popular culture; French-speaking Africa, particularly the Democratic Republic of the Congo; immigration policy; ethnographic fieldwork; public policy; systems theory; and pluralism. He is also coordinator of the Network of Municipalities in Immigration and Intercultural Relations of Quebec (RÉMIRI) and is part of a research network between the University of Montreal, the University of Geneva, and the Free University of Brussels.

White received his Bachelor of Arts degree in anthropology and international studies from the University of North Carolina at Chapel Hill in 1988; his Masters of Arts degree from McGill University in 1993; and his PhD in anthropology from McGill in 1998. His PhD dissertation was titled: " Modernity's Spiral: Popular Culture, Mastery and the Politics of Dance Music in Congo-Kinshasa." Following this, he was a postdoctoral fellow at the Center for Folklife and Cultural Heritage at the Smithsonian Institution. On January 1, 2001, he became an assistant professor at the University of California, Santa Cruz. He has been a visiting professor at the School for Advanced Studies in the Social Sciences in Paris, Cheikh Anta Diop University in Senegal, the International Max Planck Research School for Neurosciences in Germany, and Meiji University in Tokyo. White was awarded the Society for Urban, National and Transnational Anthropology's Anthony Leeds Prize (2009) and the Canadian Association of African Studies' Joel Gregory Prize (2010) for his book Rumba Rules. The book was also a finalist for the African Studies Association's Herskovits Prize.

== Selected bibliography ==
- 1996: "Talk About School: Education and the Colonial Project in French and British Africa," Comparative Education, doi:10.1080/03050069628902
- 1999: "Modernity's Trickster: 'Dipping' and 'Throwing' in Congolese Popular Dance Music," Research in African Literatures.
- 2000: "Soukouss or Sell-Out? Congolese Popular Dance Music on the World Market" in Commodities and Globalization: Anthropological Perspectives, Rowman & Littlefield. ISBN 978-0-8476-9942-1
- 2008: Rumba Rules: The Politics of Dance Music in Mobutu’s Zaire, Duke University Press. ISBN 978-0-8223-4112-3
- 2014: L'interculturel au Québec: rencontres historiques et enjeux politiques, University of Montreal Press. With Lomomba Emongo. ISBN 978-2-7606-3358-2
- 2014: Musique populaire et société à Kinshasa. Une ethnographie de l’écoute, L'Harmattan. With Lye M. Yoka. ISBN 978-2-296-09650-9
- 2017: Intercultural Cities: Policy and Practice for a New Era, Palgrave Macmillan. ISBN 978-3-319-62602-4.
- 2018: "Valeurs familiales et la méthode Sabido en République démocratique du Congo," in Nouvelles dynamiques familiales en Afrique, University of Quebec Press. With Lino Pungi and Serge Makobo. doi:10.2307/j.ctvggx3tg.24
- 2021: "An Intercultural Framework for Theory and Practice in Third Place Libraries", Public Library Quarterly. With Marie D. Martel. doi:10.1080/01616846.2021.1918968
- 2022: "Methods for the Study of Everyday Cohabitation," Journal of Intercultural Studies. With Annick Germain. doi:10.1080/07256868.2022.2047274
