= Tales of Ghosts =

2003 art history book

Tales of Ghosts: First Nations Art in British Columbia, 1922-61
- Author: Ronald W. Hawker
- Publisher: UBC Press
- Publication date: 2003
- ISBN: 9780774850445

Tales of Ghosts: First Nations Art in British Columbia, 1922-61 is an art history book by Ronald W. Hawker. It was published in 2003 by the University of British Columbia Press.

== General references ==
- Carlson, Keith Thor (2004). "Review of Tales of Ghosts: First Nations Art in British Columbia, 1922-61". The Pacific Northwest Quarterly. 95 (2): 106–107. ISSN 0030-8803.
- Neylan, Susan; Hawker, Ronald W. (2004-07-01). "Tales of Ghosts: First Nations Art in British Columbia, 1922-61". The Western Historical Quarterly. 35 (2): 247. doi:10.2307/25442996.
- Smetzer, Megan (2013-11-04). "Tales of Ghosts: First Nations Art in British Columbia, 1922-61". BC Studies.
