= Athabasca University Press =

Academic publisher

- Parent company: Athabasca University
- Founded: 2007
- Country of origin: Canada
- Headquarters location: Athabasca, Alberta
- Distribution: UBC Press (Canada); Chicago Distribution Center (US); Combined Academic Publishers (EMEA); Royden Muranaka (Asia Pacific)
- Official website: www.aupress.ca

Athabasca University Press (AU Press) is a scholarly publisher and a division of Athabasca University. Founded in 2007, the press was the first open-access publisher in Canada. Domestically, the press's books are distributed by the University of British Columbia Press.

As of 2019, the press has published over 120 peer-reviewed books, which include titles in North American Western history, labour studies, distance and online education, and indigenous studies. AU Press has also published works of fiction, drama, poetry, and autobiography, both original and translated. A number of the Press's titles have garnered academic awards, in fields ranging from history and archaeology to creative non-fiction to distance education; other titles have been recognized for their design.

In addition to producing and selling printed books, AU Press also offers free digital access to their publications on its website. Similarly, the AU Press imprint "Remix" publishes open access educational resources created by Athabasca University faculty. All works are licensed under a Creative Commons license.

The press is currently a member of the Association of University Presses, Association of Canadian University Presses, and the Book Publishers Association of Alberta.

== See also ==
- List of university presses
