= Incorporating Culture =

2018 non-fiction book

Incorporating Culture: How Indigenous People are Reshaping the Northwest Coast Art Industry
- Author: Solen Roth
- Publisher: University of British Columbia Press
- Publication date: 2018
- ISBN: 9780774837415

Incorporating Culture: How Indigenous People are Reshaping the Northwest Coast Art Industry is a non-fiction book by Solen Roth about Northwest Coast art. It was published in 2018 by the University of British Columbia Press.

== General references ==
- Ahlness, Ellen A. (2020). "Incorporating Culture: How Indigenous People are Reshaping the Northwest Coast Art Industry by Solen Roth". Canadian Ethnic Studies. 52 (1): 119–121. doi:10.1353/ces.2020.0002. ISSN 1913-8253.
- Butler-Palmer, Carolyn (2020). "Review of Incorporating Culture : How Indigenous People are Reshaping the Northwest Coast Art Industry". RACAR: revue d'art canadienne / Canadian Art Review. 45 (2): 161–163. ISSN 0315-9906.
- Leischner, Emily Jean (2019). "Review of Incorporating Culture. How Indigenous People Are Reshaping the Northwest Coast Art Industry". The Pacific Northwest Quarterly. 110 (4): 194–195. ISSN 0030-8803.
- McIlwraith, Thomas (2020). "Review of Incorporating Culture: How Indigenous People Are Reshaping the Northwest Coast Art Industry". Anthropologica. 62 (2): 459–460. ISSN 0003-5459.
