= Children's Literature and Imaginative Geography =

2018 edited collection by Aïda Hudson

- Author: Aïda Hudson
- Genre: Edited collection
- Publisher: Wilfrid Laurier University Press
- Publication date: 2018
- Pages: 357
- ISBN: 978-1-7711-2325-9
- OCLC: 1085233159

Children's Literature and Imaginative Geography is a 2018 edited collection by Aïda Hudson, published by Wilfrid Laurier University Press.
