= Andrea Procter =

Canadian anthropologist

Andrea H. Procter is a Canadian anthropologist at the Memorial University of Newfoundland.

== Education and career ==
Procter holds a Bachelor of Arts (Honours) in anthropology and English from the University of Toronto, a Master of Natural Resources Management from the University of Manitoba, and a PhD in anthropology from the Memorial University of Newfoundland. She is a member of the faculty of humanities and social sciences at Memorial University, where her research focuses on decolonization and Indigenous self-governance.

In 2021, Procter's book A Long Journey: Residential Schools in Labrador and Newfoundland won the Atlantic Book Award for Scholarly Writing and the Newfoundland and Labrador Book Award for non-fiction.

== Publications ==
=== Books as author ===
- Procter, Andrea (2020). A Long Journey: Residential Schools in Labrador and Newfoundland. St. John's: Memorial University Press. ISBN 978-1-8947-2564-4.
- Cochrane, Candace; Procter, Andrea; Nunatsiavut Creative Group (2022). TautukKonik / Looking Back: Piusigilauttavut Labradoriup Taggâni, 1969-1986 / A Portrait of Inuit life in Northern Labrador, 1969-1986. St. John's: Memorial University Press. ISBN 978-1-9904-4500-2.

=== Books as editor ===
- Natcher, David; Felt, Larry; Procter, Andrea, eds. (2012). Settlement, Subsistence, and Change among the Labrador Inuit: The Nunatsiavummiut Experience. Winnipeg: University of Manitoba Press. ISBN 978-0-8875-5731-6.
- Brice-Bennett, Carol (2023). Procter, Andrea; Onalik, Lena (eds.). Avanimiut: A History of Inuit Independence in Northern Labrador. St. John's: Memorial University Press. ISBN 978-1-9904-4514-9.
