= The International Working-Class Movement =

Book

- Editor: Moscow's Institute of the International Working Class Movement
- Subject: History of communism
- Publication date: 1976
- English publication date: 1980

The International Working-Class Movement is a projected seven-volume history of the communist movement, edited by Moscow's Institute of the International Working Class Movement. Its first volume was chaired by Boris Ponomarev.

== Bibliography ==
- Campbell, John C. (Fall 1981). "Review of The International Working-Class Movement, Vol. I". Foreign Affairs. 60 (1): 213. doi:10.2307/20041051. ISSN 0015-7120. JSTOR 20041051.
- Colbert, James G. (1982). "Review of The International Working-Class Movement: Problems of History and Theory, Vol. I". Studies in Soviet Thought. 24 (1): 56–57. ISSN 0039-3797. JSTOR 20099113.
- Gonda, I. (1977). "Review of A nemzetközi munkásmozgalom az első világháború éveiben. (The International Working-Class Movement during the First World War) 1914-1917". Acta Historica Academiae Scientiarum Hungaricae. 23 (1/2): 185–189. ISSN 0001-5849. JSTOR 42555163.
- Leadbeater, David (1983). "Review of The International Working-Class Movement: Problems of History and Theory, Volume 1, the Origins of the Proletariat and Its Evolution as a Revolutionary Class, The Institute of the International Working-Class Movement, U.S.S.R.". Labour / Le Travail. 12: 379–383. doi:10.2307/25140362. ISSN 0700-3862. JSTOR 25140362.
- Sen, Sukomal (1983). "Review of The International Working-Class Movement: Problems of History and Theory, Volume I". Social Scientist. 11 (4): 65–73. doi:10.2307/3517026. ISSN 0970-0293. JSTOR 3517026.
