= Candace Brunette-Debassige =

Dr. Candace Brunette‑Debassige is a Mushkego‑ininew Cree scholar with Cree and French settler ancestry and is a member of the Mushkegowuk Cree Nation in Treaty 9 Territory, Ontario, Canada, and she is registered with Fort Albany First Nation (Peetabeck). She is Assistant Professor in the School of Indigenous Relations and Coordinator for the Masters Indigenous Relations Program at Laurentian University.

== Career ==
Brunette-Debassige was a professor at the University of Western Ontario, having also served as Acting Vice Provost / Associate Vice President of the Indigenous Initiative, Special Advisor to the Provost (Indigenous), and Director of Indigenous Services at Western University. She was also a leader for the development of Western’s first Indigenous Strategic Plan.

Brunette‑Debassige received a Doctor of Philosophy (PhD) in Educational Policy and Leadership from the University of Western Ontario (2021), a Master of Arts in Aboriginal Education and Community Development from the University of Toronto (2010), and a Bachelor of Arts in Aboriginal Studies and Equity Studies from theUniversity of Toronto (2008).

== Awards and honours ==
She was awarded the Peace Award for Truth and Reconciliation from Atlôhsa Family Services (2019), and an international Peace and Reconciliation Award from the Association of Commonwealth Universities (2021).

In 2025, she received the Canada Prizes award for her book, Tricky Grounds.

== Published works ==
=== Books ===
- Tricky Grounds: Indigenous Women's Experiences in Canadian University Administration. University of Regina Press. 2024.

=== Chapters ===
- Batacharya, Sheila; Wong, Yuk-Lin, eds. (2018-10-12). "7 From Subjugation to Embodied Self-in-Relation". Sharing Breath: Embodied Learning and Decolonization. Athabasca University Press. ISBN 978-1-77199-192-6.
- Brunette-Debassige, Candace; Viczko, Melody (2022). "Critical Perspectives for Educational Leadership and Policy in Higher Education". In Abdi, Ali A.; Misiaszek, Greg William (eds.). The Palgrave Handbook on Critical Theories of Education. Cham: Springer International Publishing. pp. 261–282. doi:10.1007/978-3-030-86343-2_15. ISBN 978-3-030-86342-5.
- Brunette-Debassige, Candace (2024-11-21). "All Our Relations: Indigenous Women's Holistically Embodied and Relational Leadership in Canadian Universities". In Thompson, Randal Joy; Topuzova, Lazarina N. (eds.). Women Embodied Leaders. Emerald Publishing Limited. pp. 71–82. doi:10.1108/978-1-83549-476-920241006. ISBN 978-1-83549-477-6.

=== Selected articles ===
- Brunette-Debassige, Candace (2023-04-25). "Indigenous refusals in educational leadership practices in Canadian universities". AlterNative: An International Journal of Indigenous Peoples. 19 (2): 377–386. doi:10.1177/11771801231167876. ISSN 1177-1801.
- Peach, Laura; Richmond, Chantelle A. M.; Brunette-Debassige, Candace (2020-08-01). ""You can't just take a piece of land from the university and build a garden on it": Exploring Indigenizing space and place in a settler Canadian university context". Geoforum. 114: 117–127. doi:10.1016/j.geoforum.2020.06.001. ISSN 0016-7185.
- Sadler, Kathy; Johnson, Marjorie; Brunette, Candace; Gula, Lorne; Kennard, Mary Ann; Charland, David; Tithecott, Gary; Cooper, Gerry; Rieder, Michael; Watling, Chris; Herbert, Carol P; Garcia, Bertha; Hammond, Robert R (2017-01-16). "Indigenous Student Matriculation into Medical School: Policy and Progress". International Indigenous Policy Journal. 8 (1). doi:10.18584/iipj.2017.8.1.5. ISSN 1916-5781.
- Restoule, Jean-Paul; Mashford-Pringle, Angela; Chacaby, Maya; Smillie, Christine; Brunette, Candace; Russel, Gail (2013-11-12). "Supporting Successful Transitions to Post-Secondary Education for Indigenous Students: Lessons from an Institutional Ethnography in Ontario, Canada". International Indigenous Policy Journal. 4 (4). doi:10.18584/iipj.2013.4.4.4. ISSN 1916-5781.
