= Nunavut Teacher Education Program =

University courses in Nunavut, Canada

The Nunavut Teacher Education Program (NTEP), formerly the Eastern Arctic Teacher Education Program (EATEP), is an important college / university teacher education program in the territory of Nunavut and is offered through Nunavut Arctic College (NAC). This program provides Inuit from Nunavut with the opportunity to work toward a Bachelor of Education degree while remaining in the territory.

The aim is to have Inuit teaching Inuit and thus provide strong and relevant role models and give Inuit a greater say in the education system.

== Description ==
NTEP, which since 2007, has partnered with the University of Regina offers a five-year program to Inuit who wish to become teachers in Nunavut. Although aimed primarily at training primary and elementary teachers, graduates may teach at the junior high and high school level. Courses are offered mainly at the three Nunavut Arctic College campuses and some may be community based. Emphasis is put on applying the training obtained in a classroom setting to actual practice is schools and students are offered multiple practicum sessions.

The courses, which were designed to be relevant to Nunavut, try to promote Inuit culture, Inuit Qaujimajatuqangit (Inuit traditional knowledge), and Inuktut (Inuktitut and Inuinnaqtun).

Upon successful completion of all program requirements, NTEP graduates are awarded a University of Regina of Education Degree, 120 credits (B.Ed.).

== History ==
In 1979, the Eastern Arctic Teacher Education Program (EATEP) began and was designed for residents of the eastern Canadian Arctic rather than the western Northwest Territories (NWT). Later in 1981, an association with McGill University was formed. Originally a two-year program, students obtained a Certificate in Native & Northern Education and were certified to teach in the NWT. Students also obtained 60 elementary education university credits.

In 1994, a third year was added and allowed those students who received the Certificate in Native & Northern Education to go on and complete their Bachelor of Education with McGill University. Following this a fourth year was added, students received 120 credits and it became a full university program.

After the 1999 division of the NWT the program was renamed the Nunavut Teacher Education Program. In 2004 NTEP became a five-year progaram with the addition of a foundation year. The foundation year was created to ensure that all applicants met the entrance requirements.

In 2007, NTEP gained a new 5-year partnership with University of Regina. The program consists of U of R courses and transfer courses from NAC. Under the fee-for-service arrangement, the U of R provides a range of services, including visiting instructors, professional development opportunities for students and learning experiences through exchanges.

== Community-based programs ==
The Community Teacher Education Program (CTEP) provides teacher training, following the NTEP curriculum, at the community level outside the program centre of Iqaluit. This enables students to stay in their home communities with the support of their family; it also gives the students the opportunity to do their practicum in the school where they will be teaching. This has been very beneficial as it allows them to get to know the teaching staff who will become their colleagues.

== Alumni ==
As of September 2010, there were approximately 460 NTEP graduates: 260 who have obtained certificates and 200 who have earned the Bachelor of Education degree. The majority of graduates are employed, mostly within the school systems in Nunavut. There are also graduates working for the Government of Nunavut, Assistant Deputy Ministers, Deputy Ministers, with Inuit organizations across Canada, the Nunavut Sivuniksavut Training Program (in Ottawa), and the Canadian Broadcasting Corporation (CBC).
