= Nunavut Arctic College Media =

Academic publisher

- Parent company: Nunavut Arctic College
- Country of origin: Iqaluit, Canada
- Publication types: Books
- Official website: nacmedia.ca

Nunavut Arctic College Media is a university press associated with the division of the Nunavut Arctic College, located in Iqaluit, Canada. The press releases works that promote knowledge of Inuit culture, language, and history. Nunavut Arctic College Media is a member of the Association of Canadian University Presses and the Association of Canadian Publishers.

== See also ==
- List of university presses
