= Association of Canadian University Presses =

The Association of Canadian University Presses/Association des presses universitaires canadiennes (ACUP/APUC) is an association of Canadian university presses. As a collective, the presses that make up the association publish around 600 titles annually, most of which are either authored by Canadians or about Canadian subjects. ACUP/APUC is a member of the International Federation of Scholarly Publishers.

== Members ==
- Athabasca University Press
- Concordia University Press
- McGill-Queen’s University Press
- Memorial University Press
- Nunavut Arctic College Media
- Pontifical Institute of Mediaeval Studies
- Presses de l'Université de Montréal
- Presses de l'Université du Québec
- Presses de l'Université Laval
- University of Alberta Press
- University of British Columbia Press
- University of Calgary Press
- University of Manitoba Press
- University of Ottawa Press
- University of Regina Press
- University of Toronto Press
- Wilfrid Laurier University Press

== Distribution ==
In late 2023, the Association of Canadian University Presses entered into a distribution partnership with De Gruyter. Under the terms of this agreement, the books published by the 17 ACUP presses will be made available via De Gruyter's "University Press Library" platform.

== See also ==
- List of university presses
