= Nunavut Arctic College =

Community college in Nunavut, Canada

- Type: Community college
- Established: January 1, 1995; 31 years ago
- Affiliations: CCAA, ACCC, AUCC, IAU, CIS, UArctic, ACU
- President: Jackie Price
- Location: Iqaluit, Nunavut, Canada; 63°43′39.41″N 68°26′40.42″W
- Campus: Urban/Suburban/Remote. Nunatta Campus, Kitikmeot Campus, Kivalliq Campus and 24 Community Learning Centres.
- Colours: Blue; White
- Website: www.arcticcollege.com

Nunavut Arctic College (Inuktitut: ᓄᓇᕗᒻᒥᓯᓚᑦᑐᖅᓴᕐᕕᒃ, French: Collège de l’Arctique du Nunavut, Inuinnaqtun: Nunavunmi Inirnirit Iliharviat) is a public community college in the territory of Nunavut, Canada. The college has several campuses throughout the territory and operates as a public agency (Crown corporation) funded by the territorial government.

== History ==
The college was founded in 1995. Its origins date to 1968 when the Government of the Northwest Territories established the Adult Vocational Training Centre.

== Campus ==
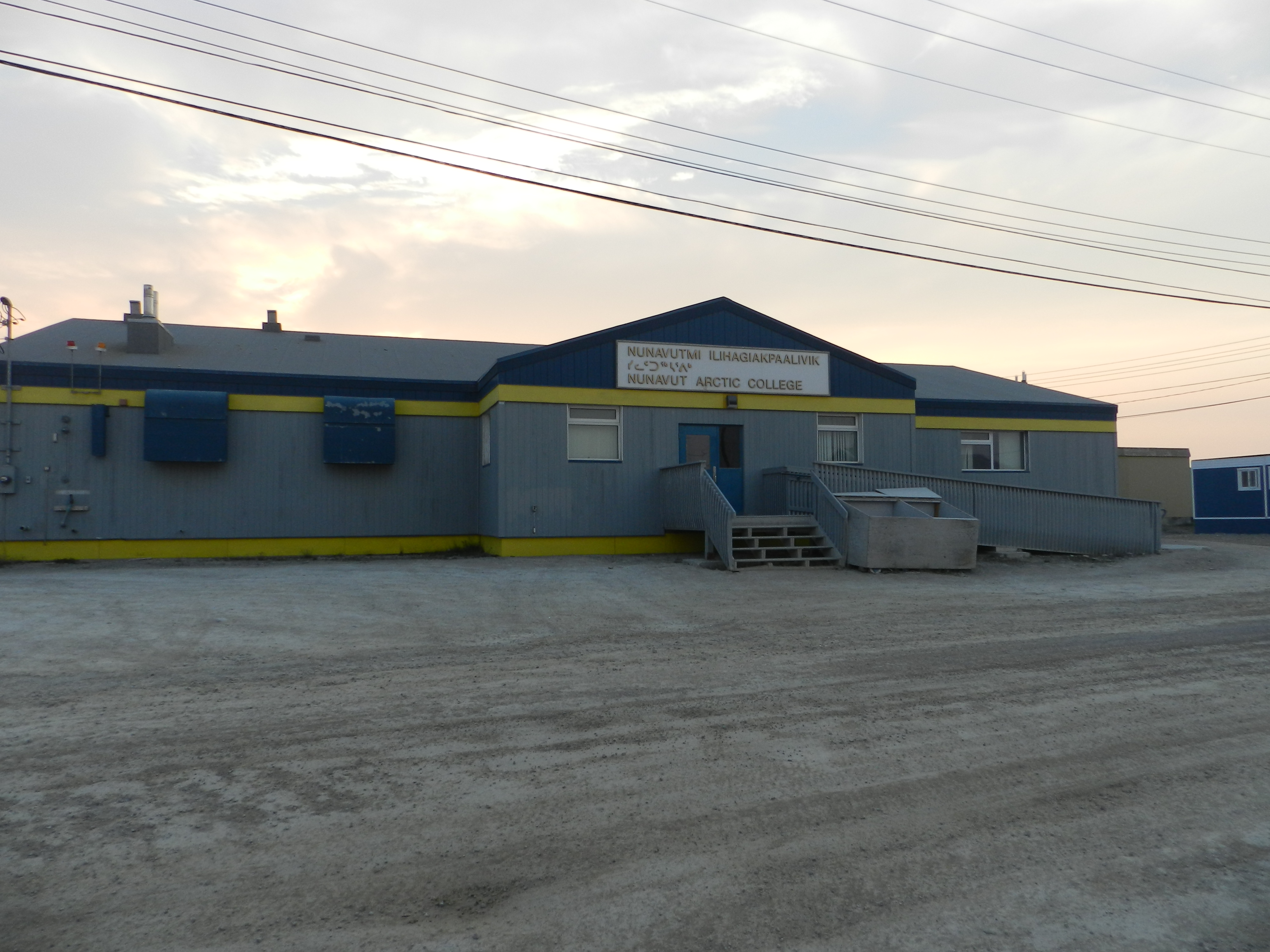
One of the Arctic College buildings in Cambridge Bay

Nunavut Arctic College has three campuses (Nunatta Campus, Kitikmeot Campus, Kivalliq Campus) and 24 Community Learning Centres.

- Nunavut Arctic College's Headquarters Arviat
- Kitikmeot Campus (Kangok Road) in Cambridge Bay
- Kivalliq Campus: Sanatuliqsarvik (Nunavut Trades Training Centre), and Kivalliq Hall are in Rankin Inlet
- Nunatta Campus is in Iqaluit
- Nunavut Research Institute – Iqaluit, Arviat, Cambridge Bay, Rankin Inlet and Igloolik
- Piqqusilirivvik Inuit Cultural Learning Centre – Clyde River with satellite locations in Baker Lake and Igloolik

On campus housing is available to full-time students at all three campuses.

== Partnerships ==
The college hosts lecturers for Akitsiraq Law School, and participates in the University of the Arctic. Other partnerships include (Education, Nursing, Law):

- Nunavut Teacher Education Program (NTEP) with Memorial University
- Nursing Program with Dalhousie University

Nunavut Arctic College is an active member of the University of the Arctic. UArctic is an international cooperative network based in the Circumpolar Arctic region, consisting of more than 200 universities, colleges, and other organizations with an interest in promoting education and research in the Arctic region.

The college participates in UArctic's mobility program north2north. The aim of that program is to enable students of member institutions to study in different parts of the North.

== See also ==
- Higher education in Canada
- Higher education in Nunavut
- University of Greenland
- Nunavut Arctic College Media
- Category:Nunavut Arctic College alumni
