= Jackie Price (academic) =

Canadian Inuk scholar and college president

President of Nunavut Arctic College
- Incumbent
- Assumed office April 1, 2024

Personal details
- Education: University of New Brunswick; University of Victoria

Jackie Price is an Inuk Canadian scholar on Inuit governance and academic administrator serving as president of Nunavut Arctic College since 2024. She previously worked for the government of Nunavut and as an instructor at Nunavut Sivuniksavut in Ottawa. Her writing on Inuit governance advocates renewed respect for traditional principals like maligait and community-centered consultation models.

== Early life and education ==
Price is Inuk and was raised in Rankin Inlet and Iqaluit. In 2000, she completed a B.A. in political science at the University of New Brunswick. Price earned a M.A. in indigenous governance at the University of Victoria in 2007. Her master's thesis was titled, "Tukisivallialiqtakka: The things I have now begun to understand. Inuit governance, Nunavut and the Kitchen Consultation Model." Gerald Taiaiake Alfred was her thesis supervisor. Price was a Ph.D. student at the Scott Polar Research Institute.

== Career ==
Price worked for the government of Nunavut. In 2008, she was an instructor at Nunavut Sivuniksavut in Ottawa. That same year, she wrote a chapter entitled "Living Inuit Governance in Nunavut." In it, she argues for new political strategies that strengthen relationships among Inuit and with the land while respecting traditional principles of Inuit governance. Price contrasts the growing pressure to approach resources and extraction through a "Euro-Canadian" economic lens with traditional Inuit principles of subsistence living. Price advocates renewed respect for maligait, the rules that govern Inuit relationships within the metaphysical world. She proposes grassroots, community-centered models of consultation, like her Kitchen Consultation Model. Price's work on indigenous governance calls attention to the colonial elements in the governance structures of Nunavut. Her perspective draws on personal experiences across communities, and she has examined university dynamics in Victoria, British Columbia, and Cambridge, England.

On April 1, 2024, Price became president of Nunavut Arctic College.
