= University of Regina Press =

Academic publisher

- Parent company: University of Regina
- Founded: 2013
- Country of origin: Regina, Saskatchewan, Canada
- Publication types: Books
- Official website: uofrpress.ca

The University of Regina Press is a university press associated with the University of Regina, located in Regina, Saskatchewan. The press was founded in 2013 and publishes books on a variety of topics, including indigenous cultures, Canadian history, politics, environmentalism, social justice, and gender and sexuality. The University of Regina Press is a member of the Association of Canadian University Presses, the Association of Canadian Publishers, and the Association of University Presses.

== See also ==
- List of English-language book publishing companies
- List of university presses
