= Canadian Public Policy =

- Discipline: Public Policy
- Language: English
- Edited by: Michael Veall

Publication details
- History: 1974-present
- Publisher: University of Toronto Press (Canada)
- Frequency: Quarterly

Standard abbreviations
- ISO 4: Can. Public Policy

Indexing
- ISSN: 0317-0861 (print); 1911-9917 (web)

Links
- Journal homepage

The Canadian Public Policy is a quarterly peer-reviewed academic journal examining economic and social policy. It is published by the University of Toronto Press.

== Abstracting and indexing ==
The journal is abstracted and indexed in:

- EBSCO databases
- EconLit
- International Bibliography of Book Reviews of Scholarly Literature on the Humanities and Social Sciences
- International Political Science Abstracts/Documentation Politique Internationale
- Journal of Economic Literature
- RePEc
- Scopus
