= Cynthia Comacchio =

Canadian historian

Cynthia R. Comacchio FRSC
- Born: Guelph, Ontario, Canada

Academic background
- Education: BA, Glendon College; MA, history, York University; PhD, history, 1987, University of Guelph
- Thesis: “The Infant Soldier”: The Great War and the Medical Campaign for Child Welfare (1988)

Cynthia R. Comacchio (Note: She is sometimes cited as Cynthia R. Abeele) FRSC is a Canadian historian. She is a professor emerita at Wilfrid Laurier University and was named a Fellow of the Royal Society of Canada in 2024.

== Early life and education ==
Comacchio was born in Guelph, Ontario, Canada, to an Italian family. She completed her Bachelor's degree at Glendon College, Master's degree at York University and her PhD at the University of Guelph.

== Career ==
After finishing her PhD, Comacchio accepted an assistant professorship at Wilfrid Laurier University. She was eventually promoted to full professor in 2000. In this role, Comacchio received the 2002 Laurier Faculty Award for Teaching Excellence. After retiring in 2022, Comacchio was appointed editor of the Ontario History Journal. In 2024, Comacchio was elected a Fellow of the Royal Society of Canada for her "significant inroads into the historical cultures of the young."

== Selected publications ==
- Ring Around the Maple: A Sociocultural History of Children and Childhoods in Canada, 19th and 20th Centuries (2024)
- The Dominion of Youth: Adolescence and the Making of Modern Canada, 1920 to 1950 (2008)
- The Infinite Bonds of Family: Domesticity in Canada, 1850-1940 (1999)
- Nations are Built of Babies: Saving Ontario’s Mothers and Children, 1900-1940 (1993)
