= Memorial University Press =

Academic publisher

- Parent company: Memorial University of Newfoundland
- Successor: ISER Books
- Country of origin: Canada
- Publication types: Books
- Official website: memorialuniversitypress.ca

Memorial University Press (formerly ISER Books) is a university press associated with Memorial University of Newfoundland. The press publishes books that focus on the North Atlantic (with a special emphasis on Newfoundland, Labrador, and Atlantic Canada). Memorial University Press is a member of the Association of Canadian University Presses and the Association of Canadian Publishers.

== See also ==
- List of university presses
