= McGill–Queen's University Press =

Canadian university press

- Parent company: McGill University and Queen's University
- Country of origin: Canada
- Headquarters location: Montreal, Quebec
- Distribution: University of Toronto Press Distribution (Canada); Ingram Content Group (US); Mare Nostrum Group (UK, EMEA, Asia)
- Publication types: Books
- Official website: www.mqup.ca

McGill–Queen's University Press (MQUP) is a Canadian university press, formed as a joint venture between McGill University in Montreal, Quebec (its main headquarters), and Queen's University in Kingston, Ontario.

McGill–Queen's University Press publishes original peer-reviewed works in the social sciences and humanities. With over 4,000 titles in print, by both leading scholars and emerging voices, McGill–Queen’s has grown to become one of the leading university presses in North America. Since 2023, the press has been under the direction of Lisa Quinn, former director of Wilfrid Laurier University Press and current president of the Association of Canadian Publishers. Previous MQUP directors include David Fate Norton and Philip Cercone. For many years, one of its senior editors was the historian and author Donald Akenson.

The press is currently a member of the Association of University Presses (AUP), the Association of Canadian University Presses (ACUP), and the Association of Canadian Publishers (ACP).

== Publications ==
Among the best-known academics to have published with the press are Jacob Neusner, Margaret Somerville, Stéphane Dion, Charles Taylor, Bruce Trigger and Christl Verduyn. It also has a poetry list including such writers as Carmine Starnino, Mark Abley, Peter Dale Scott and Brian Bartlett. In recent years the press has also become known for contentious books on Canadian politics by Tom Flanagan among others. Some of its books are translated from French.

McGill–Queen's has been awarded numerous prizes for the design of its books, as well as for editorial quality.

=== History ===
McGill–Queen's University Press began as McGill in 1961 and amalgamated with Queen's in 1969.
