= Presses de l'Université Laval =

Academic publisher in Quebec, Canada

- Parent company: Université Laval
- Founded: 1950
- Country of origin: Quebec City, Canada
- Publication types: Books
- Official website: pulaval.com

Presses de l'Université Laval (PUL) is a university press associated with Université Laval, located in Quebec City, Canada. Founded in 1950, it was the first official university press established in Quebec. Presses de l'Université Laval is a member of the Association of Canadian University Presses, and it was previously a member of the Association of American University Presses.

== See also ==
- List of university presses
