= Labour/Le Travail =

- Discipline: Labour movement
- Language: English

Publication details
- History: 1976–present
- Publisher: Canadian Committee on Labour History (CCLH), a subcommittee of the Canadian Historical Association (Canada)
- Frequency: Biannual

Standard abbreviations
- ISO 4: Labour/Trav.

Indexing
- ISSN: 0700-3862
- LCCN: 84649979
- JSTOR: 07003862
- OCLC no.: 300281020

Links
- Journal homepage; Online archive

Labour/Le Travail is an academic journal which publishes articles on the labour movement in Canada, sociology, labour economics, and employment relations. Although its focus is Canadian, the journal carries articles about the United States and other nations as well.

Labour/Le Travail is published twice a year. Each issue is about the size of a full-length book (about 350 pages).

In addition to articles, the journal publishes important documents, reports and book reviews. One issue each year contains a bibliography of articles, books and other published materials on Canadian labour studies.

Labour/Le Travail is published by the non-profit Canadian Committee on Labour History (CCLH), a subcommittee of the Canadian Historical Association. It began publishing in 1976.
