= Presses de l'Université du Québec =

Academic publisher

- Parent company: Université du Québec
- Founded: 1969
- Country of origin: Quebec City, Canada
- Publication types: Books
- Official website: puq.ca

Les Presses de l'Université du Québec (PUQ) is a university press associated with the University of Quebec. The press, which was founded in 1969, issues publications in over 80 disciplines, of which the principle ones are management science, political science, applied science, educational science, the social sciences, psychology, communication, ethics, arts, geography and tourism. Les Presses de l'Université du Québec is a member of the Association of Canadian University Presses.

== See also ==
- List of university presses
