= Presses de l'Université de Montréal =

Academic publisher

- Parent company: Université de Montréal
- Founded: 1962
- Country of origin: Montreal, Canada
- Publication types: Books
- Official website: pum.umontreal.ca

Les Presses de l'Université de Montréal (PUM) is a university press founded in 1962 and associated with the University of Montreal. Les Presses de l'Université de Montréal is a member of the Association of Canadian University Presses.

== See also ==
- List of university presses
