= Wilfrid Laurier University Press =

Publishing business of Wilfrid Laurier University

- Parent company: Wilfrid Laurier University
- Founded: 1974
- Country of origin: Canada
- Headquarters location: Waterloo, Ontario
- Distribution: University of Toronto Press (Canada); Ingram Publisher Services (US); Eurospan (outside North America)
- Publication types: Books
- Official website: www.wlupress.wlu.ca

Wilfrid Laurier University Press, based in Waterloo, Ontario, is a publisher of scholarly writing and is part of Wilfrid Laurier University. The fourth-largest university press in Canada, WLUP publishes work in a variety of disciplines in the humanities and social sciences — literary criticism, indigenous studies, sociology, environmental studies, and history among them — as well as books of regional interest. Laurier Press also provides publishing services to scholarly associations and journals.

== History ==
The press was founded in 1974. They publish 20-25 titles per year and have 800 physical titles in print and digital formats. WLUP has been typesetting books from electronic files since 1984, and was one of the first publishers to have a web presence in 1994.

Wilfrid Laurier University Press distributes titles for the Laurier Centre for Military, Strategic and Disarmament Studies, Toronto International Film Festival (in Canada) and the Cree Board of Health and Social Services of James Bay. WLUP is represented in the trade market by in Canada by Ampersand Inc., in the United States by Ingram Academic, and around the world by the Mare Nostrum Group. Wilfrid Laurier University Press is a member of the Association of University Presses, the Association of Canadian University Presses (and through them, the International Publishers Association), the Association of Canadian Publishers, and the Organization of Book Publishers of Ontario.

== Laurier Poetry Series ==
Launching in 2004, and currently with 41 titles, the Laurier Poetry Series (LPS) series aims to present a collection of works for each featured poet that spans their career. With 35 poems per volume, as well as an academic-styled introduction and an afterword by the poet, LPS addresses the problem of "out-of-print" poetry volumes for both students and casual readers. Poets in the series include Sina Queyras, Jan Zwicky, Daphne Marlatt, Fred Wah, and Nicole Brossard.
