= University of British Columbia Press =

Canadian university press

- Parent company: University of British Columbia
- Founded: 1971
- Country of origin: Canada
- Headquarters location: Vancouver, British Columbia
- Distribution: UTP Distribution (Canada); University of Chicago Press (USA); Combined Academic Publishers (EMEA); East-West Export Books (Asia Pacific); Special Book Services (South America)
- Publication types: Books
- Official website: www.ubcpress.ca

The University of British Columbia Press (UBC Press) is a university press that is part of the University of British Columbia. It is a mid-sized scholarly publisher, and the largest in Western Canada.

The press is based in Vancouver, British Columbia, Canada, and has editorial offices in Kelowna, British Columbia, and Toronto, Ontario. It was established in 1971, and was the third Canadian university press to be founded.

UBC Press is primarily a social sciences publisher. It publishes books of original scholarship that draws on and reflects current research. Each year UBC Press publishes about 70 new titles in a number of fields, including Aboriginal studies, Asian studies, Canadian history, environmental studies, gender and women's studies, health and food studies, geography, law, media and communications, military and security studies, planning and urban studies, and political science.

== Memberships and affiliations ==
The press is a member of the Canadian Association of University Presses (CAUP), the Association of University Presses (AUP), the Association of Canadian University Presses (ACUP), the Association of Canadian Publishers (ACP), the International Association of Scholarly Publishers (IASP), and the Association of Book Publishers of British Columbia.

They have partnered with Indigenous people and other organizations to create Ravenspace, a media-rich platform that emphasizes respect for Indigenous ways of sharing information.
