= 312 =

312 in various calendars
- Gregorian calendar: 312; CCCXII
- Ab urbe condita: 1065
- Assyrian calendar: 5062
- Balinese saka calendar: 233–234
- Bengali calendar: −282 – −281
- Berber calendar: 1262
- Buddhist calendar: 856
- Burmese calendar: −326
- Byzantine calendar: 5820–5821
- Chinese calendar: 辛未年 (Metal Goat); 3009 or 2802 — to — 壬申年 (Water Monkey); 3010 or 2803
- Coptic calendar: 28–29
- Discordian calendar: 1478
- Ethiopian calendar: 304–305
- Hebrew calendar: 4072–4073
- Hindu calendars
- Vikram Samvat: 368–369
- Shaka Samvat: 233–234
- Kali Yuga: 3412–3413
- Holocene calendar: 10312
- Iranian calendar: 310 BP – 309 BP
- Islamic calendar: 320 BH – 319 BH
- Javanese calendar: 192–193
- Julian calendar: 312; CCCXII
- Korean calendar: 2645
- Minguo calendar: 1600 before ROC 民前1600年
- Nanakshahi calendar: −1156
- Seleucid era: 623/624 AG
- Thai solar calendar: 854–855
- Tibetan calendar: ལྕགས་མོ་ལུག་ལོ་ (female Iron-Sheep); 438 or 57 or −715 — to — ཆུ་ཕོ་སྤྲེ་ལོ་ (male Water-Monkey); 439 or 58 or −714

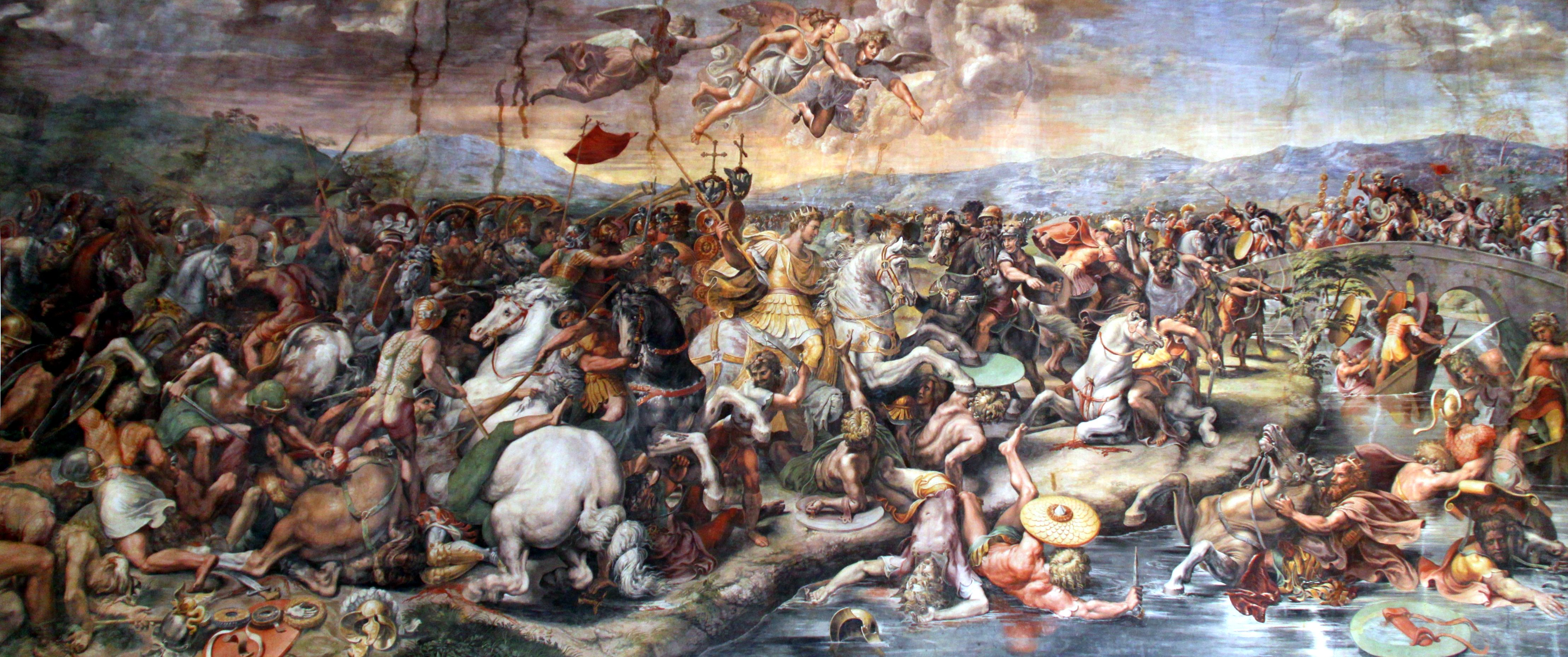
Battle of the Milvian Bridge (312)

Year 312 (CCCXII) was a leap year starting on Tuesday of the Julian calendar. In the Roman Empire, it was known as the Year of the Consulship of Constantinus and Licinianus (or, less frequently, year 1065 Ab urbe condita). The denomination 312 for this year has been used since the early medieval period, when the Anno Domini calendar era became the prevalent method in Europe for naming years.

== Events ==
=== By place ===
==== Roman Empire ====
- Constantine I crosses the Cottian Alps with an army (40,000 men) and defeats Maxentius's generals in three battles at Turin, Brescia and Verona. Maxentius's Praetorian Prefect Ruricius Pompeianus is killed in the fighting outside Verona.
- October 28 – Battle of the Milvian Bridge: Constantine defeats Maxentius at the Milvian Bridge, becoming the only Roman emperor in the West. Prior to the battle, he reportedly has a vision of a cross (labarum) with the phrase "in hoc signo vinces" ("In this sign you shall conquer"). This encourages him to convert to Christianity.
- October 29 – Constantine enters Rome; he stages a grand adventus in the city, and is met with popular jubilation. Maxentius' body is fished out of the Tiber and decapitated.
- Constantine forges an alliance with co-emperor Licinius, and offers him his half-sister, Constantia, in marriage. The Praetorian Guard and Imperial Horse Guard (equites singulares Augusti) are disbanded.
- Emperor Maximinus Daza campaigns unsuccessfully against the Armenians.

=== By topic ===
==== Religion ====
- Constantine I adopts the words "in hoc signo vinces" as a motto, and has the letters X and P (the first letters of the Greek word Christ) emblazoned on the shields of his soldiers.
- The Council of Carthage supports Donatism, which espouses a rigorous application and interpretation of the sacraments. These doctrines will be condemned by the Council of Arles (314).
- Constantine I promotes a policy of state sponsorship of Christianity, perhaps even becoming a Christian himself (see Constantine the Great and Christianity).

== Births ==
- Dao'an, Chinese Buddhist monk and writer (d. 385)
- Huan Wen (or Yuanzi), Chinese general (d. 373)

== Deaths ==
- October 28 – Maxentius, Roman emperor (b. 283)
- Clement of Ancyra, Christian bishop and martyr
- Guo Xiang, Chinese scholar and philosopher (b. 252)
- Huyan, Chinese empress of the Xiongnu state
- Ruricius Pompeianus, Roman praetorian prefect
