= Battle of Brescia (312) =

312 AD battle in the Civil Wars of the Tetrarchy

- Part of Civil wars of the Tetrarchy
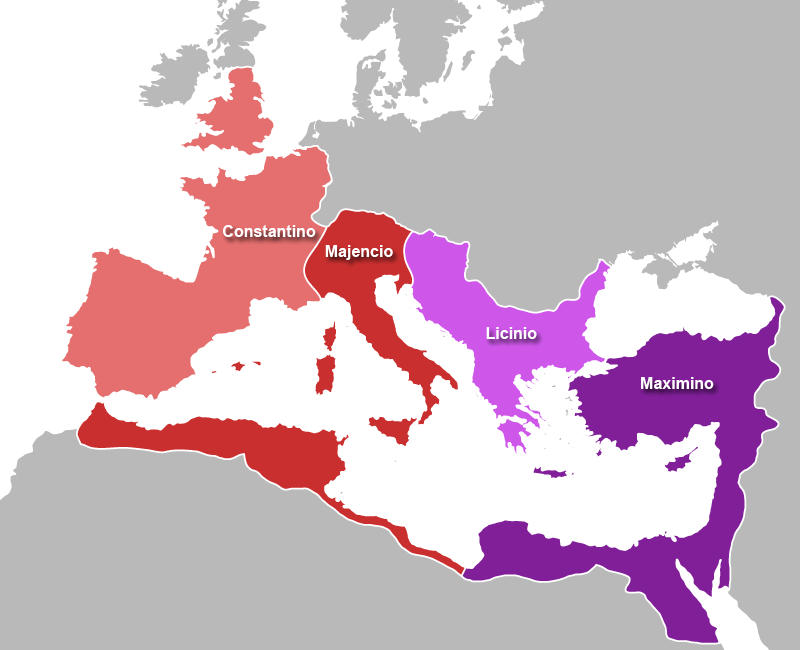
- Roman Empire (311)
Date	Summer of 312
Location	Brescia, in the north of Italy. 45°32′41.06″N 10°12′43.06″E
Result	Constantinian victory

Belligerents
Constantinian forces	Maxentian forces

Commanders and leaders
Constantine the Great	Ruricius Pompeianus

Strength
Unknown	Unknown
- Casus belli: Avenge the death of Maxentius' father.
- Location within Italy

The Battle of Brescia (Latin: Brixia) was a confrontation that took place during the summer of 312, between the Roman emperors Constantine the Great and Maxentius in the town of Brescia, in northern Italy. Maxentius declared war on Constantine on the grounds that he wanted to avenge the death of his father Maximian (r. 285–308, 310), who had committed suicide after being defeated by him. Constantine would respond with a massive invasion of Italy.

The Battle of Brescia took place after the Battle of Augusta Taurinorum (modern Turin), and preceded the penultimate battle between the two emperors, which was fought near Verona.

== Background ==
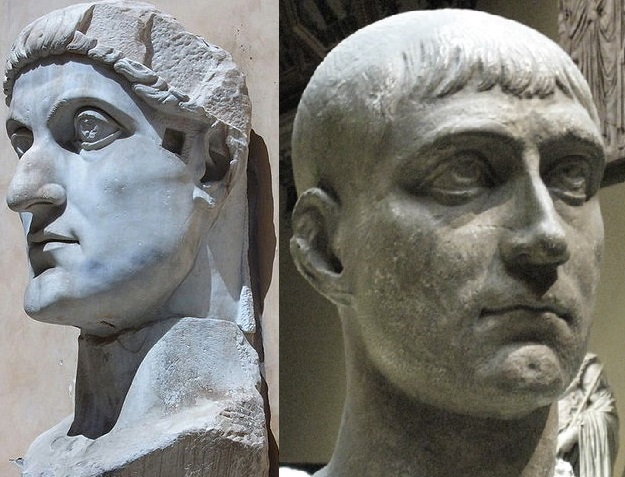
Head of the Colossus of Constantine, left. On the right, bust of Maxentius.

The Roman Empire was divided into two parts since 293, each ruled by an Augustus (major emperor) and a Caesar (minor emperor). This form of government was called tetrarchy. In 306, the Augustus of the West Constantius Chlorus (r. 293–306) died at Eboracum (present-day York, England), and his soldiers —cantoned in this region of Britain— then proclaimed his son Constantine as his successor. However, the Augustus of the East, Galerius (r. 293–311), elevated Flavius Severus (r. 305–307) to the position of Augustus, since according to the prerogatives of the tetrarchic system, in force at the time, and being the western Caesar, he should be the one to succeed the dead Augustus. After some negotiations, Galerius relegated Constantine to the position of Caesar, which he eventually accepted and allowed Flavius Severus to assume the position of Augustus of the western half of the empire.

Maxentius (r. 306–312), son of Maximian (r. 285–305, 310), the Augustus predecessor of Constantius Chlorus, envious of Constantine's position, declared himself emperor of Italy with the title of Princeps in October 306, then summoned his father, now retired, to rule together. Galerius, upon learning of these events, entrusted the Augustus Flavius Severus with the task of crushing the conspiracy. In 307, commanding a large army, Flavius Severus managed to besiege Rome, but was defeated and subsequently executed. In the summer of 307, the Augustus Galerius decided to invade Italy in order to avenge the death of Flavius Severus, however, his army was not large enough to besiege all the fortifications of Rome, which is why he had to withdraw. In 308, during the celebration of the Conference of Carnunus, convened by Galerius, the officer Licinius (r. 308–324) was appointed Augustus of the West and, therefore, was to overthrow the usurper, but he preferred not to participate in the affair. That same year, sometime before the conference, Maximian had tried to depose his son, the plan failed and he had to flee to the court of Constantine in Gaul.

In 310, Maximian also attempted to depose Constantine, but was defeated and forced to commit suicide. The following year, Maxentius, seeking revenge for the death of his father, declared war on Constantine, who responded by invading northern Italy at the head of forty thousand soldiers. Zosimos claimed that the invading army consisted of ninety thousand legionaries and eight thousand equites of Germanic and Celtic origin, in addition to part of the army stationed in Britain. The Constantinian army moved inland after the Siege of Segusium (modern Susa, in Italy) and confronted troops of Maxentius encamped in the vicinity of Augusta Taurinorum (modern Turin). Constantine defeated them and continued on to Mediolanum (modern Milan), where they opened the gates to him. He remained in the city until mid-summer, then continued his march.

== Battle ==
At that time, Maxentius had appointed Ruricius Pompeianus as prefect of the praetorium and set up his headquarters in Verona. Aware of Constantine's proximity, Ruricius sent a contingent of heavy cavalry —the size of which is unknown— to the west, in order to block the invading army. Constantine, realizing that his path was obstructed, ordered his own cavalry to move forward and charge the enemy. The battle would have lasted only a short time, with the Constantinian cavalry easily defeating their opponents, who, once disbanded, were forced to retreat back to Verona.

== Consequences ==
With this new victory, the way to the base of operations of Maxentius' army was open. Constantine took the opportunity to move quickly towards Verona, where he would engage in a new battle against a large enemy contingent led by Ruricius Pompeianus. This would be the penultimate victory in his successful campaign in Italy. From here, Constantine would march on to Rome to face Maxentius directly at the Battle of the Milvian Bridge. The victory of the former led to the end of the tetrarchy.

== Bibliography ==
- Anonymous (3rd-4th centuries). Panegyrici Latini. (in Latin)
- Barnes, Timothy David (1981). Constantine and Eusebius. Cambridge, Massachusetts: Harvard University Press. ISBN 978-0-674-16531-1.
- Curran, John (2000). Pagan City and Christian Capital: Rome in the Fourth Century. Oxford: Oxford University Press. ISBN 0-19-815278-7.
- DiMaio, Michael (1997a). "Maxentius (306-312 A.D.)". Salve Regina University. Archived from the original on 29 September 2007.
- DiMaio, Michael (1996b). "Galerius (305-311 A.D.)". Salve Regina University.
- DiMaio, Michael (1996c). "Constantius I Chlorus (305-306 A.D.)". Salve Regina University.
- DiMaio, Michael (1997c). "Licinius (308-324 A.D.)". Salve Regina University.
- DiMaio, Michael (1997b). "Maximianus Herculius (286-305 A.D)". Salve Regina University.
- Elliott, T. G. (1996). The Christianity of Constantine the Great. Scranton, Pennsylvania: University of Scranton Press. ISBN 0-940866-59-5.
- Eutropius, Flavius (4th century). Breviarium historiae romanae. (in Latin)
- Jones, Arnold Hugh Martin (1978). Constantine and the Conversion of Europe. University of Toronto Press. ISBN 0802063691.
- Lenski, Noel Emmanuel (2006). The Cambridge companion to the Age of Constantine. Cambridge University Press. ISBN 0-521-52157-2.
- MacMullen, Ramsey (1969). Constantine. London: Dial Press. ISBN 0-7099-4685-6.
- Odahl, Charles Matson (2010). Constantine and the Christian Empire (2nd ed.). New York: Routledge. ISBN 978-0-415-38655-5.
- Pohlsander, Hans (2004). The Emperor Constantine. London and New York: Routledge. ISBN 0-415-31937-4.
- Potter, David Stone (2004). The Roman Empire at Bay AD 180-395. London and New York: Routledge. ISBN 0-415-10057-7.
- Ridley, Ronald T. (2017). Zosimus, New History. A Translation with Commentary. Brill Publishers. ISBN 9780959362602.
