= One in a Million: A Memoir =

2001 book

- Author: Jeff Widmer
- Language: English
- Subject: Mary G. Clark
- Genre: Autobiography
- Publisher: University of Scranton Press
- Publication date: 2001
- Publication place: United States

One in a Million: A Memoir is the autobiography of Mary G. Clark of Old Forge, Lackawanna County, Pennsylvania, a medical pioneer who turned the dream of healing into a multimillion-dollar firm. The book was ghostwritten by Jeff Widmer, and published in 2001 by the University of Scranton Press.

== Development ==
The book was ghostwritten by Jeff Widmer (The Spirit of Swiftwater) and published in 2001 by the University of Scranton Press.

== Synopsis ==
One in a Million chronicles Clark's life as she struggled through poverty and abuse. The daughter of a miner, she faced sickness, fire, divorce, and venture capitalists to take her company from a garage in coal country to the Nasdaq. A registered nurse and licensed physicians assistant, Clark pioneered techniques of wound healing and nutritional counseling during a time when smoking and diet pills were normal. She served the famous and the infamous, including Joe Kopechne, father of Mary Jo Kopechne.

Dermasciences, the company she founded and took public, marketed a product she invented called Dermagran, a skin salve used to treat decubitus ulcers, or bedsores.
