= Siege of Segusio =

312 AD battle in the Civil Wars of the Tetrarchy

- Part of Civil wars of the Tetrarchy
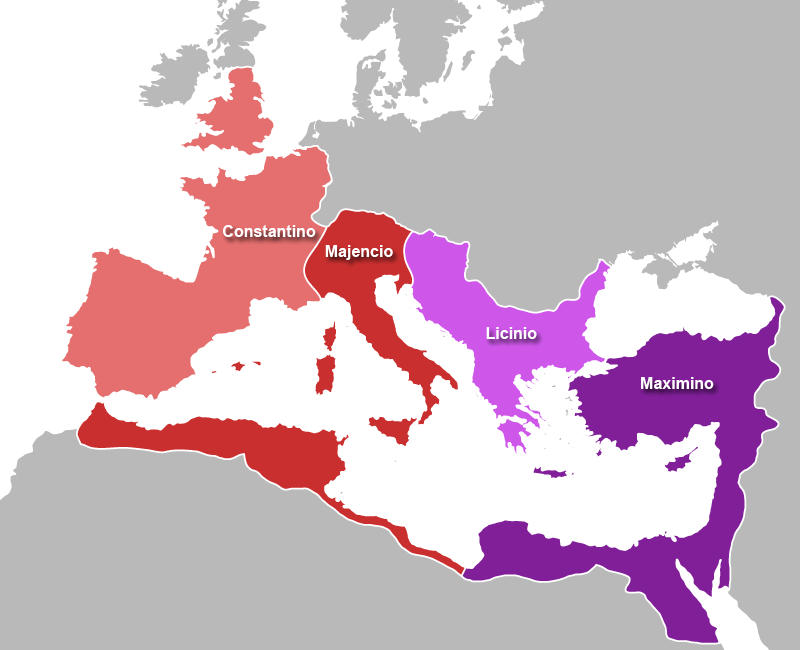
- Roman Empire (311)
Date	Spring of 312
Location	Segusio, present-day Susa, in Piedmont, Italy. 45.133333°N 7.05°E
Result	Constantinian victory

Belligerents
Constantinian forces	Maxentian forces

Commanders and leaders
Constantine the Great	Unknown
- Casus belli: Avenge the death of Maxentius' father.

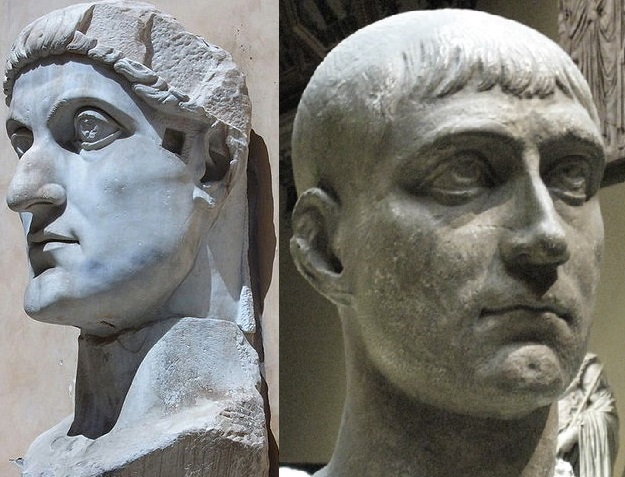
Head of the Colossus of Constantine, left. On the right, bust of Maxentius.

The siege of Segusio (Latin: Segusium) or siege of Susa was the first clash of the civil war between the Roman emperors Constantine the Great (r. 306–337) and Maxentius (r. 306–312) in the spring of 312. In that year, Maxentius had declared war on Constantine, claiming to intend to avenge the death of his father Maximian (r. 285–308, 310), who had committed suicide after being defeated by him. Constantine would respond with an invasion of northern Italy.

The siege of Segusio was the first of many battles that took place in the Italian peninsula, in all of them Constantine was victorious. With the capture of the city after subjecting it to a siege, the victorious emperor was able to continue his march through the interior of the peninsula until he reached Augusta Taurinorum, where he fought the Battle of Turin against the forces of Maxentius.

== Background ==
At the end of the 3rd century, the Roman Empire was divided into East and West, and each part was ruled by an Augustus, or major emperor, and a Caesar, or minor emperor. After the Augustus of the East, Galerius, bestowed the dignity of Caesar on Maxentius (r. 306–312), son of Emperor Maximian Herculius (r. 285–305, 310), he married Galerius' daughter, Valeria Maximilla. On October 28, 306, Maxentius proclaimed himself princeps. The following year, the young emperor assumed the title of Augustus, forcing his father Maximian to ratify it to give his rule the appearance of legitimacy.

As soon as Galerius heard of his son-in-law's actions, he sent Emperor Flavius Severus to put down the rebellion. Maxentius, with the help of a ruse by his father Maximian, managed to take Severus prisoner. When Flavius Severus died, Galerius invaded Italy to try to avenge his death, but realizing that Maxentius would be trying to win over his army, he chose not to trust his own troops and withdrew.

Between 308 and 310, Maximian tried to assume all power, to the detriment of his son Maxentius, without achieving his goal. He then tried to win Constantine to his cause, but this plan also failed, then he tried to win Diocletian to his side at Carnuntum. When his intrigues were frustrated, Maximian Herculius returned to the side of his son-in-law Constantine in Gaul, where he died in 310 after being implicated in a plot against him. The following year, Maxentius, demanding revenge for the death of his father, declared war on Constantine, who, in response, invaded northern Italy, mobilizing 40,000 soldiers, according to some sources. According to the chronicles of the historian Zosimus, the Constantinian forces consisted of 90,000 legionaries and 8,000 horsemen.

== Battle and consequences ==
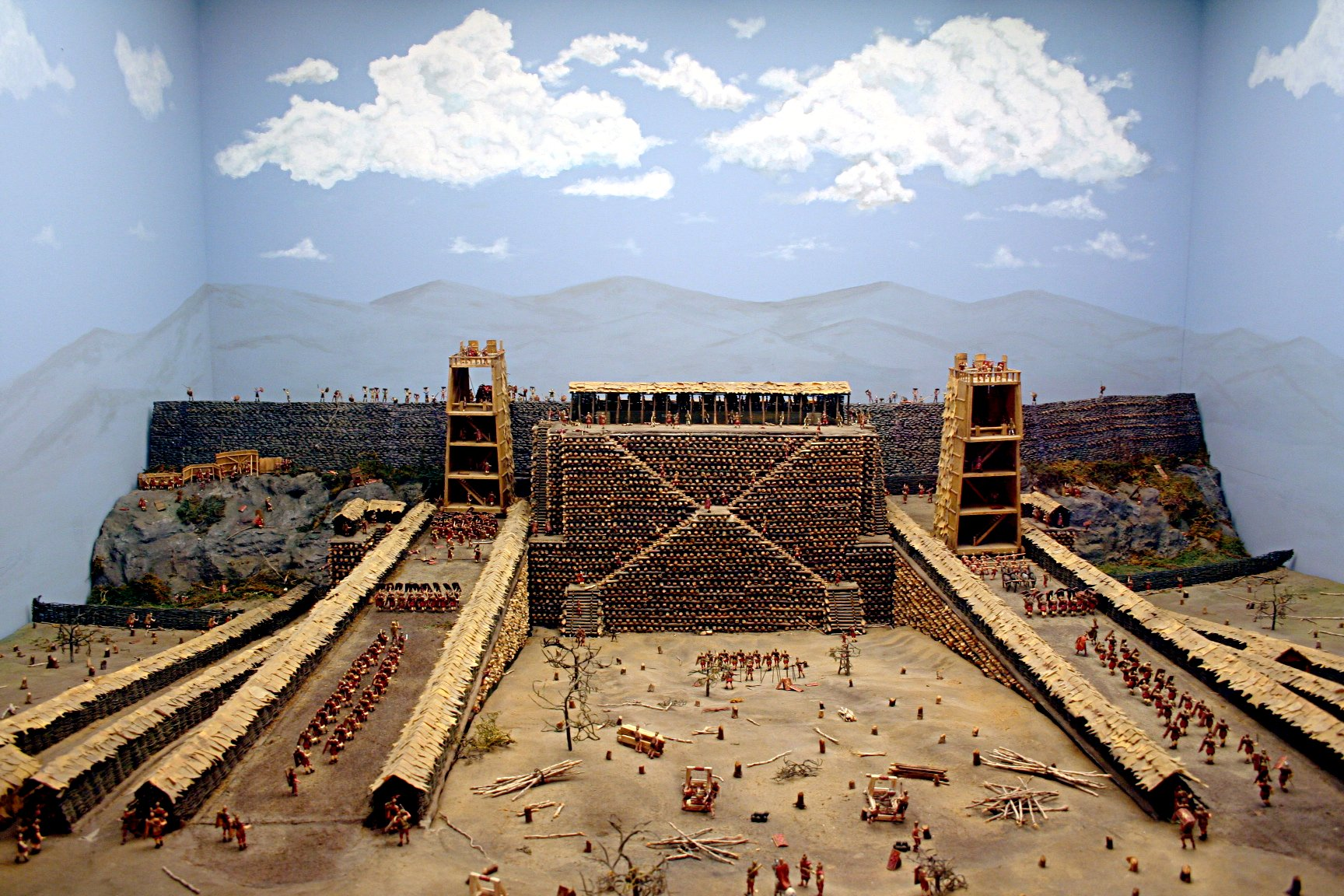
Diorama showing a typical Roman siege of a fortified city.

The first town Constantine's army encountered on its way to Rome was Segusio (present-day Susa, Italy), a city heavily walled during the refortification program of northern Italian cities the previous year.

Rather than bow to the invading army, the citizens of Segusio closed their gates to Constantine. The emperor then ordered his men to set fire to its great gates and scale its walls. The city was quickly taken, but Constantine prevented his troops from sacking the city, preferring to continue his advance into the interior of Italy.

With the conquest of Segusio, the Constantinian army marched in the direction of Augusta Taurinorum (present-day Turin), where an army composed mainly of heavy cavalry was encamped. In the vicinity of this city the Battle of Turin was fought, where Constantine would obtain a new victory, which opened the way to the other important cities of the Padan Plain.

Subsequently, a series of triumphs would follow, as in Brescia and Verona. The surrender of the latter city led to the unconditional submission of Aquileia, Mutina (now Modena) and Ravenna. Thus the road to Rome was open to Constantine. The Battle of the Milvian Bridge was the last confrontation of the war between the two emperors. Maxentius died in battle and his head was paraded through Rome. Constantine thus became the only emperor of the western part of the Roman Empire.

== Bibliography ==
- Anonymous (3rd-4th centuries). Panegyrici Latini.
- Barnes, Timothy David (1981). Constantine and Eusebius. Cambridge, Massachusetts: Harvard University Press. ISBN 978-0-674-16531-1.
- Curran, John (2000). Pagan City and Christian Capital. Oxford: Oxford University Press. ISBN 0-19-815278-7.
- Cameron, Averil (2001). El Bajo Imperio romano (284-430 d. de C.) (in Spanish). Translated by Carbajosa, Pablo. Ediciones Encuentro. ISBN 8474906202.
- DiMaio, Michael (1996b). "Galerius (305-311 A.D.)". Salve Regina University.
- — (1997a). "Maxentius (306-312 A.D.)". Salve Regina University.
- — (1997b). "Maximianus Herculius (286-305 A.D)". Salve Regina University.
- Jones, Arnold Hugh Martin (1978). Constantine and the Conversion of Europe. University of Toronto Press. ISBN 0802063691.
- Lenski, Noel Emmanuel (2006). The Cambridge companion to the Age of Constantine. Cambridge University Press. ISBN 0-521-52157-2.
- MacMullen, Ramsay (1969). Constantine. London: Dial Press. ISBN 0-7099-4685-6.
- Odahl, Charles Matson (2004). Constantine and the Christian Empire. New York: Routledge. ISBN 0-415-38655-1.
- Ridley, Ronald T. (2017). Zosimus, New History. A Translation with Commentary. Brill. ISBN 9780959362602.
