= Repton Stone =

The Repton Stone is an Anglo-Saxon sculpture discovered in 1979 at St Wystan’s Church in Repton, Derbyshire, England. This carved sandstone cross shaft, dating to the late 8th to early 9th century, is possibly the oldest depiction of an English King outside of coinage and has been identified with Aethelbald, King of Mercia. The stone is currently displayed at the Derby Museum and Art Gallery.

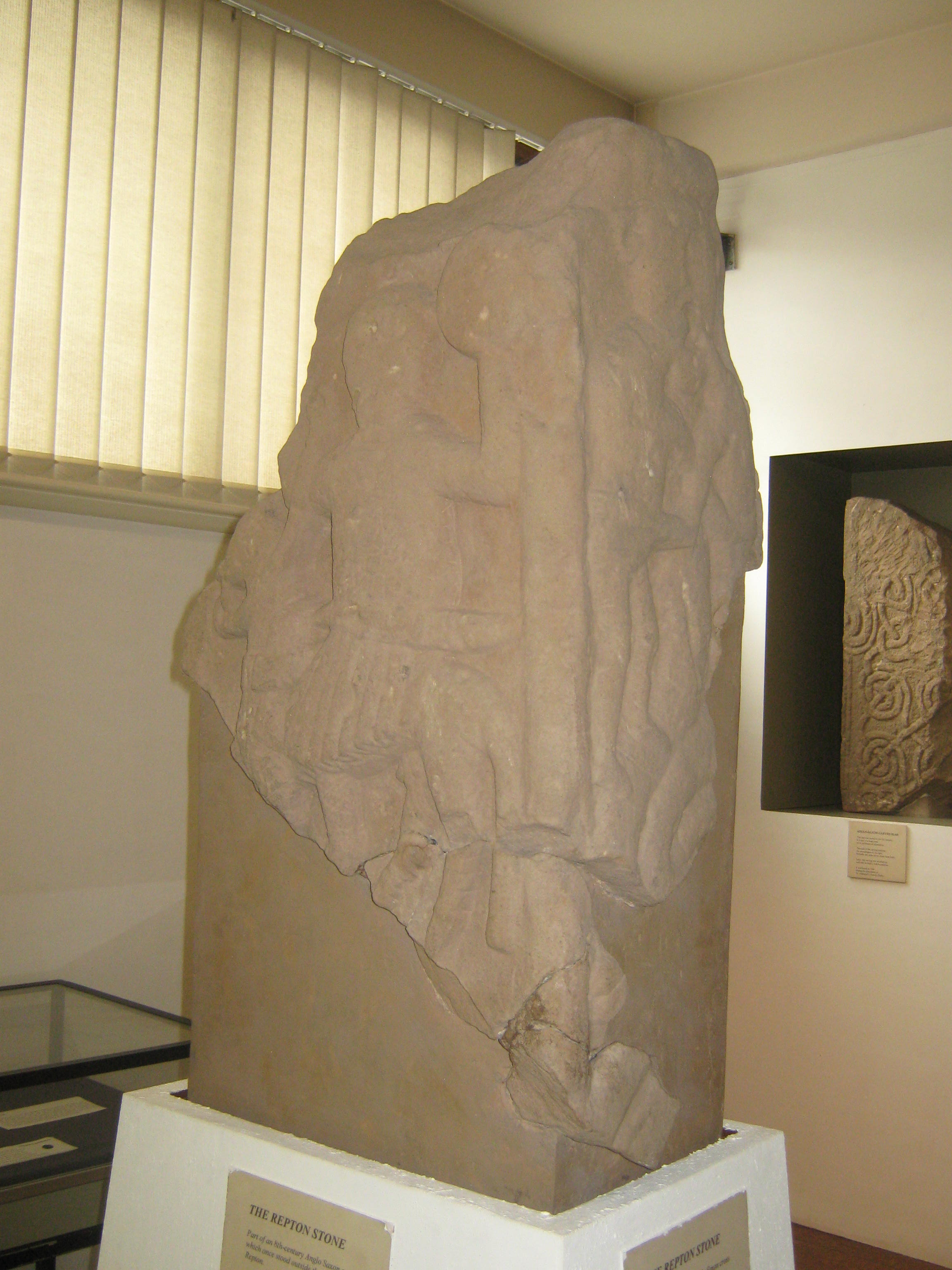
The Repton Stone in the Derby Museum

== Discovery and context ==
The Repton Stone was found broken and upside down in a pit immediately outside the eastern window of the Anglo-Saxon crypt of St Wystan’s Church during excavations led by archaeologists Martin Biddle and Birthe Kjølbye-Biddle in August 1979. The pit likely dates to the 11th or early 12th century, suggesting the cross was broken and discarded around that time. The stone is believed to have been part of a larger standing cross, likely erected before the Viking Great Heathen Army wintered at Repton, as the monastery was not refounded after their departure.

== Description ==
=== Face A ===
Face A features a prominent carving of a mounted warrior, depicted in a hieratic, full-face pose, staring directly at the viewer. The rider, a male figure with a mustache, wears mail armor and a diadem, suggesting royal or high-status identity. He brandishes a sword and a raised shield, with a second weapon, likely a seax (a type of Anglo-Saxon knife or dagger), at his waist. The horse is depicted as a stallion with incised details indicating a well-groomed appearance. The rider’s legs show crossed garters, a detail that may reflect contemporary dress or artistic convention.

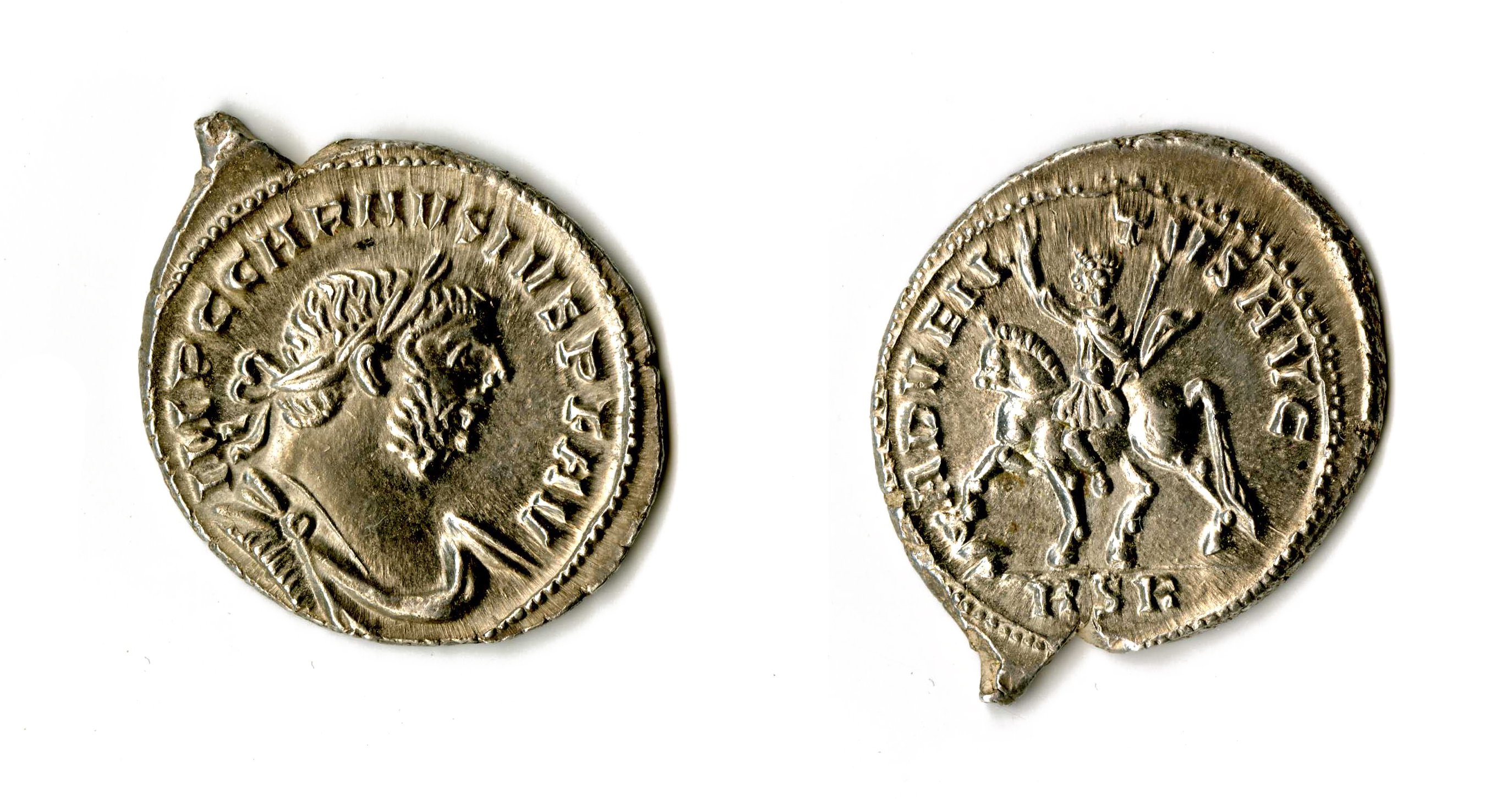
Silver Denarius of the imperial usurper, Carausius, with the "adventus" motif on the reverse

This scene is widely interpreted as deriving from the late Roman imperial adventus tradition, symbolizing the arrival or triumph of an emperor, as seen in portable objects like cameos and silver dishes. The Repton rider closely resembles figures such as Constantius II on a 4th-century silver dish from Kertch, Crimea, suggesting the sculptor drew on late antique or Byzantine models.

=== Face B ===
Face B depicts a monstrous creature, often described as a serpent or dragon, consuming the heads of two human figures. This scene is interpreted as a possible representation of a hell-mouth or a mythological motif, though its exact meaning remains uncertain due to the lack of direct parallels in Anglo-Saxon art. The carving is weathered but retains clear details of the creature’s form and the figures it engulfs.

=== Faces C and D ===
Face C is heavily weathered, with some traces of carving, possibly figural, but no clear details survive. Face D is completely sheared off, offering no discernible imagery. The presence of a dowel hole suggests the stone was part of a larger cross structure, with set-backs on all sides indicating a possible tapering toward the cross-head.
