= The Spirit of Swiftwater =

Book by Jeff Widmer

- Author: Jeff Widmer
- Language: English
- Subject: History of vaccines
- Genre: Non-fiction
- Publisher: University of Scranton Press
- Publication date: 1998
- Publication place: United States

The Spirit of Swiftwater: 100 Years at the Pocono Labs is a book written by Jeff Widmer and published in 1998 by the University of Scranton Press, Scranton, PA. The book surveys the history of vaccine development in the United States from 1887 to 1987 through the eyes of the people who worked at what is now Sanofi Pasteur, the biologics division of Sanofi Aventis.

The Spirit of Swiftwater was Widmer's first book. His second, One in a Million, is the ghostwritten autobiography of nurse and medical entrepreneur Mary G. Clark of Clarks Summit, PA.

Together the books became the first business and trade paperback books published by the university press.
