= Civil wars of the Tetrarchy =

306–324 wars between Roman co-emperors

Civil Wars of the Tetrarchy
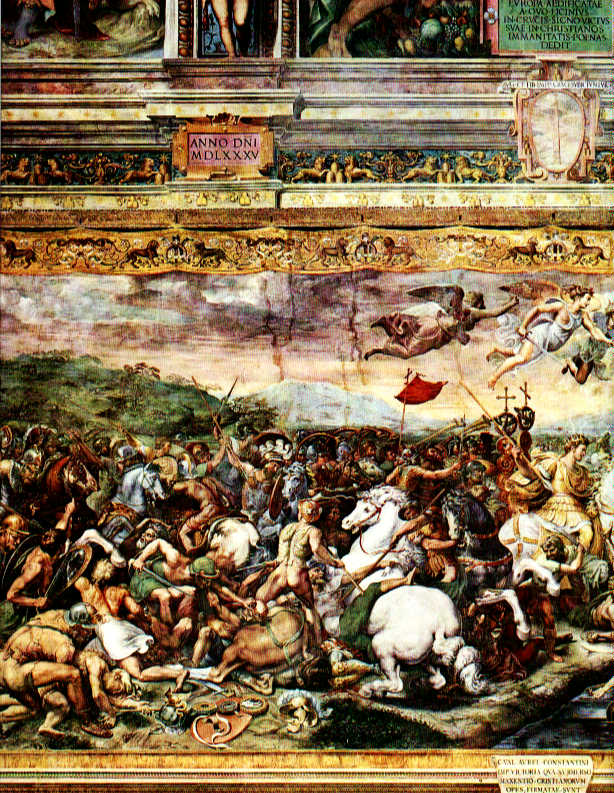
- The Battle of the Milvian Bridge by Giulio Romano (1520–1524)
Date	306 – 324 AD
Location	Roman Empire (primarily the Italian Peninsula, the Balkans, Anatolia, and Roman Egypt)
Result	Victory for Constantine I: Collapse of the Tetrarchy system; Consolidation of the Roman Empire under a single ruler; Rise of Constantine the Great as sole Emperor; Foundation of Constantinople; Legalization and state favor of Christianity

Belligerents
Constantine I; Licinius (311–316; briefly allied); Galerius († 311); Severus II († 307)	Maxentius († 312); Maximian († 310); Maximinus II Daia († 313)	Licinius (316–324; final phase opposition)

Commanders and leaders
Constantine the Great; Licinius (until 316); Galerius; Severus II	Maxentius; Maximian; Maximinus II Daia	Licinius (from 316); Valerius Valens; Martinian

Strength
Variable over time (approx. 40,000–130,000 per major campaign field army)	Variable over time (approx. 40,000–100,000+ under Maxentius)	Approx. 150,000–165,000 (Licinius at Adrianople/Chrysopolis)

Casualties and losses
Heavy, unquantified precisely by ancient sources	Heavy; includes elimination of rival emperors and their dynastic lines	Approx. 50,000+ at Adrianople and Chrysopolis combined
- Key individual conflicts include the Campaign of Constantine against Maxentius (312), the Civil Wars of Constantine and Licinius (316, 324), the Battle of Milvian Bridge (312), and the Battle of Chrysopolis (324).

The civil wars of the Tetrarchy were a series of conflicts between the co-emperors of the Roman Empire, starting from 306 AD with the usurpation of Maxentius and the defeat of Severus, and ending with the defeat of Licinius at the hands of Constantine I in 324 AD.

== Background ==
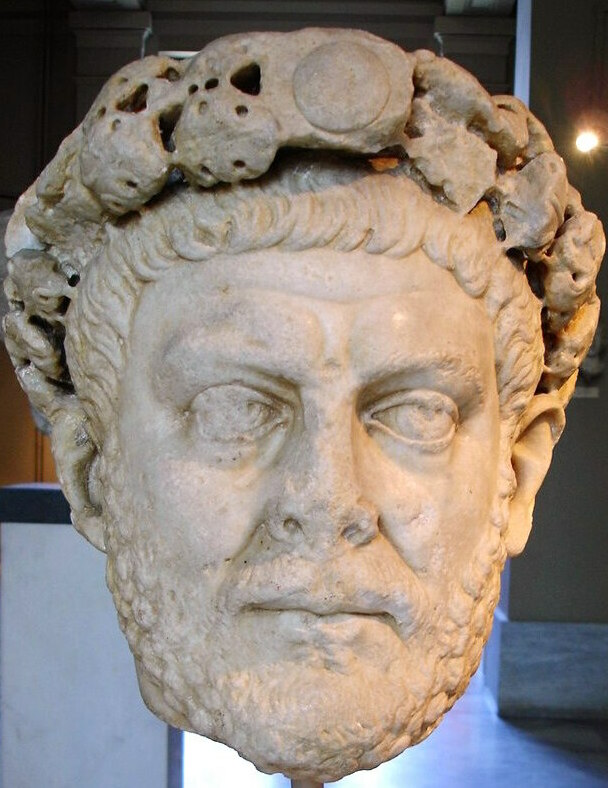
The emperor Diocletian, who established the Tetrarchy.

The Tetrarchy was the administrative division of the Roman Empire instituted by Roman emperor Diocletian in 293 AD, marking the end of the Crisis of the Third Century and the recovery of the Roman Empire. The first phase, sometimes referred to as the Diarchy ("the rule of two"), involved the designation of the general Maximian as co-emperor – firstly as Caesar (junior emperor) in 285, followed by his promotion to Augustus in 286. Diocletian took care of matters in the Eastern regions of the Empire, while Maximian similarly took charge of the Western regions. In 293, feeling more focus was needed on both civic and military problems, Diocletian, with Maximian's consent, expanded the imperial college by appointing two Caesars (one responsible to each Augustus) – Galerius and Constantius Chlorus.

The senior emperors jointly abdicated and retired in 305 AD, thereby elevating Constantius and Galerius to the rank of Augusti. They in turn appointed two new Caesars, Severus in the west under Constantius, and Maximinus Daza in the east under Galerius.

== Opening gambits ==
The death of Constantius at Eburacum (now York) in 306 AD saw the first crack in the political edifice of the Tetrarchy. Rather than accepting the elevation of Severus from Caesar to Augustus, the troops at Eburacum elevated Constantius' son, Constantine, to the position of Augustus. Galerius, the senior emperor, was sent a portrait of Constantine wearing a crown of laurels; by accepting this symbol, Galerius would be acknowledging Constantine as heir to his father's throne. Constantine passed off responsibility for his unlawful ascension on his army, claiming they had "forced it upon him". Galerius was put into a fury by the message; he almost set the portrait on fire. His advisers calmed him, and argued that outright denial of Constantine's claims would mean certain war. Galerius was compelled to compromise: he granted Constantine the title "Caesar" rather than "Augustus" (the latter office went to Severus instead). Wishing to make it clear that he alone gave Constantine legitimacy, Galerius personally sent Constantine the emperor's traditional purple robes. Constantine accepted the decision, knowing that it would remove doubts as to his legitimacy.

This act motivated Maxentius, the son of Maximian, to also declare himself Emperor at Rome in 306 AD. Galerius, worried that Maxentius might inspire even more claims to the throne, ordered Severus to put down the usurpation swiftly. Severus moved from his capital, Mediolanum, towards Rome, where Maximian had come out of retirement and become Maxentius' co-emperor. The soldiers in the invading army had previously served under Maximian, and upon arriving in Rome, they switched sides and supported their former commander. Abandoned, Severus fled to Ravenna, an impregnable position: in March or April 307, Maximian convinced him to surrender in exchange for leniency. Despite Maximian's assurance, Severus was displayed as a captive and later imprisoned at Tres Tabernae, near Rome.

The joint rule of Maxentius and Maximian in Rome was tested further when Galerius himself marched to Italy in the summer of 307 with an even larger army. Some time during the invasion, Severus was put to death by Maxentius, probably at Tres Tabernae (the exact circumstances of his death are not certain). The usurpers' strong position in Italy prompted Galerius to open negotiations, during which Maxentius repeated the strategy he had used against Severus: many soldiers, attracted by the promise of large sums of money and the authority of Maximian, defected from the invading army. Galerius was forced to withdraw, plundering Italy on his way. Maxentius' reign over Italy and Africa was thus firmly established. As early as 307, he tried to arrange friendly contacts with Constantine. In the summer of that year, Maximian travelled to Gaul, where Constantine married his daughter Fausta and, in turn, was appointed Augustus by the senior emperor. However, Constantine tried to avoid breaking with Galerius and did not openly support Maxentius during the invasion.

In 308, probably in April, Maximian tried to depose his son at an assembly of soldiers in Rome; surprisingly to him, the troops present remained faithful to his son, and he had to flee to Constantine.

In the conference of Carnuntum in the autumn of 308, Maxentius was once again denied recognition as legitimate emperor, and Licinius was appointed Augustus with the task of regaining the usurper's domain.

In 310, Maximian rebelled against Constantine while the emperor was on campaign against the Franks. Maximian had been sent south to Arles with part of Constantine's army to defend against attacks by Maxentius in southern Gaul. In Arles, Maximian announced that Constantine was dead and took up the imperial purple. He offered bribes to any soldiers who would support him as emperor, but most of Constantine's army remained loyal, and Maximian was compelled to leave. Constantine soon heard of the rebellion, abandoned his campaign against the Franks, and moved quickly to southern Gaul, where he confronted the fleeing Maximian at Massilia. The town was better able to withstand a longer siege than Arles, but it made little difference as loyal citizens opened the rear gates to Constantine. Maximian was captured, reproved for his crimes, and stripped of his title for the third and last time. Constantine granted Maximian some clemency but strongly encouraged his suicide. In July 310, Maximian hanged himself.

== War of Constantine and Maxentius ==
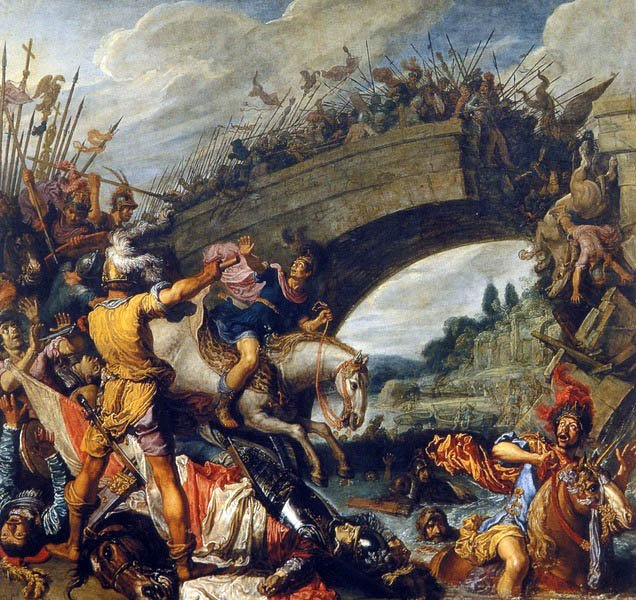
The Battle of the Milvian Bridge saw the death of Maxentius in 312 AD.

By the middle of 310, Galerius had become too ill to involve himself in imperial politics. His final act survives: a letter to the provincials posted in Nicomedia on 30 April 311, proclaiming an end to the persecutions of Christians, and the resumption of religious toleration. He died soon after the edict's proclamation, destroying what little stability remained in the tetrarchy. Maximinus mobilized against Licinius, and seized Asia Minor. A hasty peace was signed on a boat in the middle of the Bosphorus. While Constantine toured Britain and Gaul, Maxentius prepared for war. He fortified northern Italy and strengthened his support in the Christian community by allowing it to elect a new Bishop of Rome, Eusebius.

Maxentius' rule was nevertheless insecure. His early support dissolved in the wake of heightened tax rates and depressed trade; riots broke out in Rome and Carthage; and Domitius Alexander was able to usurp his authority in Africa briefly. By 312, he was a man barely tolerated, not one actively supported, even among Christian Italians. In the summer of 311, Maxentius mobilized against Constantine while Licinius was occupied with affairs in the east. He declared war on Constantine, vowing to avenge his father's death. To prevent Maxentius from forming an alliance against him with Licinius, Constantine forged his own alliance with Licinius over the winter of 311–12. He offered him his sister Constantia in marriage. Maximinus considered Constantine's arrangement with Licinius an affront to his authority. In response, he sent ambassadors to Rome, offering political recognition to Maxentius in exchange for military support. Maxentius accepted. According to Eusebius, inter-regional travel became impossible, and there was military buildup everywhere. There was "not a place where people were not expecting the onset of hostilities every day".

Constantine's advisers and generals cautioned against preemptive attack on Maxentius; even his soothsayers recommended against it, stating that the sacrifices had produced unfavourable omens. Constantine, with a spirit that left a deep impression on his followers and inspired some to believe he had supernatural guidance, ignored all these cautions. Early in the spring of 312, Constantine crossed the Cottian Alps with a quarter of his army, a force numbering about 40,000. The first town his army encountered was Segusium (Susa, Italy), a heavily fortified town that shut its gates to him. Constantine ordered his men to set fire to its gates and scale its walls. He took the town quickly. Constantine ordered his troops not to loot the town and advanced with them into northern Italy.

At the approach to the west of the important city of Augusta Taurinorum (Turin, Italy), Constantine encountered a large force of heavily armed Maxentian cavalry. In the ensuing battle Constantine's army encircled Maxentius' cavalry, flanked them with his own cavalry, and dismounted them with blows from his soldiers' iron-tipped clubs. Constantine's armies emerged victorious. Turin refused to give refuge to Maxentius' retreating forces, opening its gates to Constantine instead. Other cities of the northern Italian plain sent Constantine embassies of congratulation for his victory. He moved on to Milan, where he was met with open gates and jubilant rejoicing. Constantine rested his army in Milan until mid-summer 312, when he moved on to Brixia (Brescia).

Brescia's army was easily dispersed, and Constantine quickly advanced to Verona, where a large Maxentian force was camped. Ruricius Pompeianus, general of the Veronese forces and Maxentius' praetorian prefect, was in a strong defensive position, since the town was surrounded on three sides by the Adige. Constantine sent a small force north of the town in an attempt to cross the river unnoticed. Ruricius sent a large detachment to counter Constantine's expeditionary force, but was defeated. Constantine's forces successfully surrounded the town and laid siege to it. Ruricius gave Constantine the slip and returned with a larger force to oppose Constantine. Constantine refused to let up on the siege and sent only a small force to oppose him. In the desperately fought encounter that followed, Ruricius was killed and his army destroyed. Verona surrendered soon afterwards, followed by Aquileia, Mutina (Modena), and Ravenna. The road to Rome was now wide open to Constantine.

Maxentius prepared for the same type of war he had waged against Severus and Galerius: he sat in Rome and prepared for a siege. He still controlled Rome's praetorian guards, was well-stocked with African grain, and was surrounded by the seemingly impregnable Aurelian Walls. He ordered all bridges across the Tiber cut, reportedly on the counsel of the gods, and left the rest of central Italy undefended; Constantine secured that region's support without challenge. Constantine progressed slowly along the Via Flaminia, allowing the weakness of Maxentius to draw his regime further into turmoil. Maxentius' support continued to weaken: at chariot races on 27 October, the crowd openly taunted Maxentius, shouting that Constantine was invincible. Maxentius, no longer certain that he would emerge from a siege victorious, built a temporary boat bridge across the Tiber in preparation for a field battle against Constantine. On 28 October 312, the sixth anniversary of his reign, he approached the keepers of the Sibylline Books for guidance. The keepers prophesied that, on that very day, "the enemy of the Romans" would die. Maxentius advanced north to meet Constantine in battle.

Maxentius organized his forces – still twice the size of Constantine's – in long lines facing the battle plain, with their backs to the river. Constantine's army arrived at the field bearing unfamiliar symbols (the "Chi-Rho") on either its standards or its soldiers' shields. According to Lactantius, Constantine was visited by a dream the night before the battle, wherein he was advised "to mark the heavenly sign of God on the shields of his soldiers...by means of a slanted letter X with the top of its head bent round, he marked Christ on their shields." Eusebius describes another version, where, while marching at midday, "he saw with his own eyes in the heavens a trophy of the cross arising from the light of the sun, carrying the message, In Hoc Signo Vinces or 'Conquer By This'"; in Eusebius's account, Constantine had a dream the following night, in which Christ appeared with the same heavenly sign, and told him to make a standard, the labarum, for his army in that form. Eusebius is vague about when and where these events took place, but it enters his narrative before the war against Maxentius begins. Eusebius describes the sign as Chi (Χ) traversed by Rho (Ρ), or ☧ a symbol representing the first two letters of the Greek spelling of the word Christos or Christ. The Eusebian description of the vision has been explained as a "solar halo", a meteorological phenomenon which can produce similar effects. In 315 a medallion was issued at Ticinum showing Constantine wearing a helmet emblazoned with the Chi-Rho, and coins issued at Siscia in 317/18 repeat the image. The figure was otherwise rare, however, and is uncommon in imperial iconography and propaganda before the 320s.

Constantine deployed his own forces along the whole length of Maxentius' line. He ordered his cavalry to charge, and they broke Maxentius' cavalry. He then sent his infantry against Maxentius' infantry, pushing many into the Tiber, where they were slaughtered and drowned. The battle known as the Battle of the Milvian Bridge was brief: Maxentius' troops were broken before the first charge. Maxentius' horse guards and praetorians initially held their position, but broke under the force of a Constantinian cavalry charge; they also broke ranks and fled to the river. Maxentius rode with them, and attempted to cross the bridge of boats, but he was pushed by the mass of his fleeing soldiers into the Tiber, and drowned.

Constantine entered Rome on 29 October. He staged a grand adventus in the city, and was met with popular jubilation. Maxentius' body was fished out of the Tiber and decapitated. His head was paraded through the streets for all to see. After the ceremonies, Maxentius' disembodied head was sent to Carthage; at this Carthage would offer no further resistance.

== War of Licinius and Maximinus Daza ==
Meanwhile, after Galerius died in 311, the eastern provinces were divided between Maximinus Daza and Licinius. Daza was unhappy that Licinius had been made senior emperor by Galerius, and took the first available opportunity to declare himself as emperor. Licinius held the eastern European provinces, while Daza took possession of the Asiatic provinces.

In 312, while Constantine was fighting Maxentius, Daza was busy campaigning against the Armenians. He had returned to Syria by February 313 when he discovered the alliance that Constantine and Licinius had forged in Mediolanum. Deciding to take the initiative, Daza left Syria with 70,000 men and reached Bithynia, although the harsh weather he encountered along the way had gravely weakened his army. In April 313, he crossed the Bosporus and went to Byzantium, which was held by Licinius' troops. Undeterred, he took the town after an eleven-day siege. He moved to Heraclea, which he captured after a short siege, before moving his forces to the first posting station. With a much smaller body of men, possibly around 30,000, Licinius arrived at Adrianople while Daza was still besieging Heraclea. On 30 April 313, the two armies clashed at the Battle of Tzirallum, and in the ensuing battle, Daza's forces were crushed. Ridding himself of the imperial purple and dressing like a slave, Daza fled to Nicomedia. Believing he still had a chance to come out victorious, Daza attempted to stop the advance of Licinius at the Cilician Gates by establishing fortifications there. Unfortunately for Daza, Licinius' army succeeded in breaking through, forcing Daza to retreat to Tarsus, where Licinius continued to press him on land and sea. The war between them only ended with Daza's death in August 313.

== Wars of Constantine and Licinius ==
After Maxentius' defeat, Constantine gradually consolidated his military superiority over his rivals in the crumbling Tetrarchy. In 313, he met Licinius in Milan to secure their alliance by the marriage of Licinius and Constantine's half-sister Constantia. During this meeting, the emperors agreed on the so-called Edict of Milan, (Note: The term is a misnomer as the act of Milan was not an edict, while the subsequent edicts by Licinius – of which Lactantius and Eusebius record the edicts to the provinces of Bythinia and Palestine, respectively – were not issued in Milan.) officially granting full tolerance to "Christianity and all" religions in the Empire. The document had special benefits for Christians, legalizing their religion and granting them restoration for all property seized during Diocletian's persecution. It repudiates past methods of religious coercion and uses only general terms to refer to the divine sphere – "Divinity" and "Supreme Divinity", summa divinitas. The conference was cut short, however, when news reached Licinius that his rival Maximinus had crossed the Bosporus and invaded European territory. Licinius departed and eventually defeated Maximinus, gaining control over the entire eastern half of the Roman Empire. Relations between the two remaining emperors deteriorated, though, and in 316, hostilities were prompted by Constantine's appointment of his brother-in-law, Bassianus, as Caesar. Bassianus was discovered to be intriguing against Constantine, perhaps at the prodding of his own brother Senecio, a close associate of Licinius. When Constantine demanded that Licinius hand over Senecio, Licinius refused. Constantine marched against Licinius, and the two fought against one another in the war of Cibalae, with Constantine being victorious. They clashed again in the Battle of Campus Ardiensis in 317, and agreed to a settlement in which Constantine's sons Crispus and Constantine II, and Licinius' son Licinianus were made caesars.

In 320, Licinius reneged on the religious freedom promised by the Edict of Milan in 313 and began to oppress Christians anew. It became a challenge to Constantine in the west, climaxing in the great civil war of 324. Licinius, aided by Goth mercenaries, represented the past and the ancient Pagan faiths. Constantine and his Franks marched under the standard of the labarum, and both sides saw the battle in religious terms. Supposedly outnumbered but fired by their zeal, Constantine's army emerged victorious in the Battle of Adrianople. Licinius fled across the Bosphorus and appointed Martius Martinianus, the commander of his bodyguard, as Caesar, but Constantine next won the Battle of the Hellespont, and finally the Battle of Chrysopolis on 18 September 324. Licinius and Martinianus surrendered to Constantine at Nicomedia on the promise their lives would be spared: they were sent to live as private citizens in Thessalonica and Cappadocia respectively, but in 325 Constantine accused Licinius of plotting against him and had them both arrested and hanged; Licinius's son (the son of Constantine's half-sister) was also eradicated. Thus Constantine became the sole emperor of the Roman Empire, ending the civil wars of the Tetrarchy.
