= Battle of Turin (312) =

Battle at Augusta Taurinorum that was won by Constantine the Great

- Part of Civil wars of the Tetrarchy
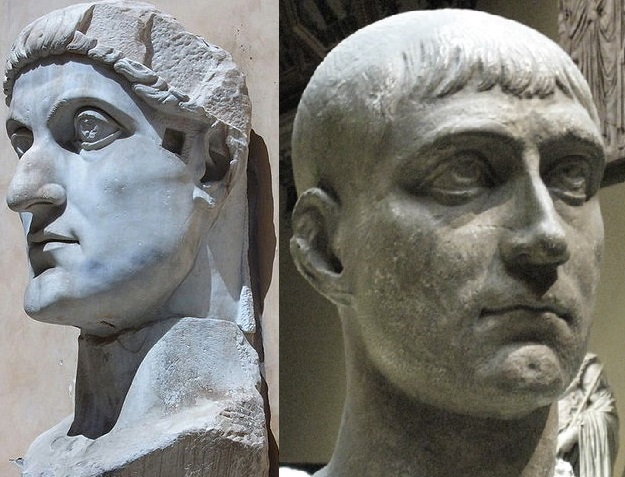
- Left: Head of the Colossus of Constantine, Vatican Museums; Right: Bust of Maxentius, Pushkin Museum
| Date | 312 AD |
| Location | Turin (Augusta Taurinorum) 45°04′00″N 7°42′00″E |
| Result | Constantinian victory |

Belligerents
| Constantinian forces | Maxentian forces |

Commanders and leaders
| Constantine the Great | Commander unknown |

Strength
| 40,000 | 100,000; Including an unknown number of clibanarii and cataphractarii |
- Location within Italy Battle of Turin (312) (Mediterranean)

The Battle of Turin was fought in 312 between Roman emperor Constantine the Great and the troops of his rival Maxentius. Constantine won the battle, showing an early example of the tactical skill which was to characterise his later military career. The campaign ended with his more famous victory at the Milvian Bridge immediately outside of Rome.

== Prelude ==
Although they were brothers-in-law, relations between Constantine and Maxentius had become strained. Both emperors originally achieved power unconstitutionally, through acclamation by their troops; however, Constantine had been recognised as legitimate within the Tetrachic system and Maxentius had not. This allowed Constantine, when he finally moved against Maxentius, to pose as a legitimate emperor suppressing a rebellious usurper. Constantine advanced from his portion of the Roman Empire, and crossed the Alps with less than 40,000 veterans at Mont Cenis pass. Maxentius, in response, fortified himself in Rome, relying on the large military force he had within Italy. Constantine faced the first resistance to his invasion at the city of Segusium (Susa, Italy). He ordered his men to set fire to its gates and scale its walls. Constantine took the town quickly, ordered his troops not to loot the town, and advanced into northern Italy.

== Battle ==
On approaching the important city of Augusta Taurinorum (Turin), Constantine encountered a Maxentian army which prominently included a force of heavily armoured cavalry, called clibanarii or cataphractarii in the ancient sources. The Maxentian cataphracts were drawn up for battle in a deep wedge formation. In response, Constantine extended the frontage of his battle line, allowing Maxentius' cavalry to ride into the middle of his array. As his army outflanked that of the enemy, Constantine's more lightly armoured and mobile cavalry were able to make repeated charges on the exposed flanks of the Maxentian cataphracts. Constantine's cavalry were equipped with iron-tipped clubs, ideal weapons for dealing with heavily armoured foes. Some Maxentian cavalrymen were unhorsed, while many others were incapacitated or killed by the blows of clubs. Constantine then commanded his foot soldiers to advance against the surviving Maxentian infantry, cutting them down as they fled.

Contemporary panegyrics relate that victory was easily gained by Constantine's forces. The people of Turin refused to give refuge to the retreating forces of Maxentius, and closed the city gates against them. The citizens reportedly cheered Constantine's troops as they slaughtered those of Maxentius' soldiers trapped against the city walls. Following the battle, Constantine entered the city to the acclamations of its populace. Other cities of the north Italian plain, recognising Constantine's military prowess and his favourable treatment of the civil population, sent him embassies of congratulation for his victory.

== Aftermath ==
The victory at Turin opened Italy to Constantine. He moved on to Milan, where he was met with open gates and jubilant rejoicing. He resided there until the middle of the summer of 312 before moving on. He routed an enemy cavalry force camped near Brescia, and later won a major battle at Verona, where Maxentius' most senior general, Ruricius Pompeianus, was killed. After Maxentian resistance in northern Italy had been overcome, Constantine marched on Rome, where he defeated the army of Maxentius at the Battle of the Milvian Bridge; Maxentius drowned in the Tiber during the course of the battle.

== See also ==
- List of Roman wars and battles
- Battle of Brescia
