= Association of Jesuit University Presses =

Academic association

The Association of Jesuit University Presses (AJUP) was an association of university presses whose parent institutions were members of the Association of Jesuit Colleges and Universities. Georgetown University Press and Fordham University Press were the two largest members in terms of publications.

== Activities ==
Members of the Association of Jesuit University Presses met once a year to discuss issues facing the AJUP, such as potential cooperative advertising strategies for religious books and scholarly journals.

== Members ==
The AJUP was chartered by eleven founding Jesuit university presses, including:

- Boston College Press
- Creighton University Press
- Fordham University Press
- Georgetown University Press
- Loyola New Orleans Press
- Marquette University Press
- Rockhurst University Press
- Saint Joseph's University Press
- Saint Louis University Press
- University of San Francisco Press
- University of Scranton Press
