= Saint Joseph's University Press =

Publishing house in Pennsylvania

- Parent company: Saint Joseph's University
- Publication types: Books
- Official website: www.sjupress.com

Saint Joseph's University Press is a university press associated with Saint Joseph's University, located in Philadelphia, Pennsylvania. The press specializes in books about early modern Catholicism, the visual arts, Jesuit Studies, and the Philadelphia area. The press also publishes journals focused on Gerard Manley Hopkins (The Hopkins Quarterly) and Thomas and Jane Welsh Carlyle (Carlyle Studies Annual).

Saint Joseph's University Press is currently an introductory member of the Association of University Presses (AUP). It was also a founding member of the now-defunct Association of Jesuit University Presses (AJUP).

== See also ==
- List of English-language book publishing companies
- List of university presses
