= Al-Kitaab series =

Arabic language textbooks

Al-Kitaab fii Ta^{c}allum al-^{c}Arabiyya الكِتَابُ فِي تَعَلُّمِ العَرَبِيَّة
- Alif Baa: Introduction to Arabic Letters and Sounds; Al-Kitaab Part One: A Textbook for Beginning Arabic; Al-Kitaab Part Two: A Textbook for Intermediate Arabic; Al-Kitaab Part Three: A Textbook for Advanced Arabic
- Author: Kristen Brustad; Mahmoud Al-Batal; Abbas Al-Tonsi
- Country: United States
- Language: American English
- Discipline: Arabic language
- Publisher: Georgetown University Press
- Media type: Textbook
- No. of books: 4
- Website: https://alkitaabtextbook.com/

The Al-Kitaab Arabic Language Program is a series of textbooks for the Arabic language published by Georgetown University Press with the full title Al-Kitaab fii Taʿallum al-ʿArabiyya (Arabic: الكِتاب في تَعَلًُم العَرَبِيّة, "The book of Arabic learning"). It is written by Kristen Brustad, Mahmoud Al-Batal, and Abbas Al-Tonsi and was first published in 1995; since that time, it has become the most popular Arabic textbook in the United States.

Brustad and Al-Batal wrote the Al-Kitaab series while they were associate professors of Arabic at the University of Texas at Austin, where they taught for years. They now live in Lebanon, Al-Batal's homeland, and work at the American University of Beirut. Al-Tonsi is a senior lecturer at the Georgetown University School of Foreign Service in Qatar.

== Series ==
=== Books ===
Alif Baa introduces the basics of the Arabic alphabet.

Al-Kitaab Part One contains thirteen lessons teaching basic language skills related to daily life. Each lesson contains seven sub-sections: new vocabulary, grammatical rules, a story in dialectal Arabic, the same story in formal Arabic, cultural material, a dialog, and review exercises.

Al-Kitaab Part Two contains ten lessons, covering daily life and general interest topics. Each lesson is broken down into sub-categories: new vocabulary, grammatical rules, cultural material, and listening, reading and writing exercises. Some reading and writing exercises are drawn from sources of authentic Arabic use, such as Al-Jazeera and Lebanese Broadcasting Corporation.

Al-Kitaab Part Three contains ten lessons, primarily focused on modern prose texts. It, too, follows the same basic structure of new vocabulary, long readings with accompanying exercises, grammatical lessons, and additional authentic text readings. Chapter Four is focused on Arabic poetry, and subsequent chapters include a number of poems among the readings, which is unusual in textbooks at this level but praised by reviewers. Other readings include short stories by Yahya al-Tahir 'Abd Allah and Tayeb Salih.

=== Edition history ===
The first editions were published beginning in 1995, with the publication of Alif Baa and Part One as a set, accompanied by 4 video cassettes and 23 audio cassettes. Part Two was published in 1997, and accompanied by five audio cassettes. Part Three was published in 2001.

The second editions were published beginning in 2004, with the publication of Alif Baa and Part One. The audiovisual materials were provided on DVDs, and featured the same scenes of Maha and Khalid re-recorded with new actors and provided in both Fusha and colloquial Egyptian Arabic. Also new recordings added in the second edition included readings of the vocabulary as isolated words and used in a sentence, a "Culture" section with things like songs and interviews with native Arabic speakers, and new listening exercises. The organization of the chapters was not changed, though each chapter had more supporting material and exercises added to it. The second edition of Part Two appeared by 2006, and included 3 DVDs. Part Three appeared by 2007, and included a DVD and an MP3 CD. By 2007, the series also offered "Audio on the Go" MP3 CDs for Alif Baa, Part One, and Part Two.

The third editions have been released for Alif Baa, Part One, and Part Two, but the publishers state that they currently have no plans to publish a third edition of Part Three. Part One was published in 2011. Part Two was published in 2013. The third edition provides audiovisual materials both on DVDs as in the second edition, and online through streaming video and audio. It also includes access to an online course management system, including interactive exercises with automatic grading.

=== Publications ===
- Kristen Brustad; Mahmoud al-Batal; Abbas al-Tonsi (2014). Alif Baa: Introduction to Arabic Letters and Sounds (3rd ed.). Georgetown University Press. ISBN 9781589016323.
- Kristen Brustad; Mahmoud al-Batal; Abbas al-Tonsi (2011). Al-Kitaab fii Ta'allum al-'Arabiyya, Part One: A Textbook for Beginning Arabic (3rd ed.). Georgetown University Press. ISBN 9781589017474.
- Kristen Brustad; Mahmoud al-Batal; Abbas al-Tonsi (2013). Al-Kitaab fii Ta'allum al'Arabiyya, Part Two: A Textbook for Intermediate Arabic (3rd ed.). Georgetown University Press. ISBN 978-1-58901-962-1.
- Kristen Brustad; Mahmoud al-Batal; Abbas al-Tonsi (2007). Al-Kitaab fii Ta'allum al'Arabiyya, Part Three: A Textbook for Arabic (2nd ed.). Georgetown University Press. ISBN 978-1-58901-962-1.

== Contents ==
=== Audiovisual materials ===
The goal of the series is to provide students with intermediate competence in the four language skills of listening, speaking, reading, and writing. Accordingly, in addition to the reading and writing exercises in the printed textbooks, the series is accompanied by video and audio recordings. One critique of the textbooks is that the audio and video technology has not kept up with the needs of modern students, who often lack DVD players but likely want to access course materials while offline, and would therefore benefit from the ability to download MP3 and MP4 files, though other reviewers have found the online resources sufficiently convenient.

=== Formal and colloquial language ===
The first edition of the Al-Kitaab series included materials in both formal Modern Standard Arabic (also called Fusha) and Egyptian Arabic. At the time, this was unusual, as most Arabic instructional texts taught only Fusha, or, less commonly, only a colloquial dialect. The current third edition includes Fusha, Egyptian, and Levantine Arabic.

=== Storyline ===
The textbook series follows the stories of a number of characters. Part One follows Maha Abu El-Ila, a girl living in New York, and her cousin Khalid. The third edition added new characters from Syria, Nisreen and Tariq Al-Nuuri, to Part One. Both stories are told in Fusha, and Maha and Khalid's stories are repeated in Egyptian Arabic, and Nisreen and Tariq's in Levantine Arabic. Part Two continues these four characters' stories, and introduces four new characters: Ibrahim and Muna (in Fusha and Egyptian), and Ghassan and Muna (in Fusha and Levantine).
