= Marquette University Press =

- Parent company: Marquette University
- Founded: 1916
- Country of origin: United States
- Headquarters location: Milwaukee
- Distribution: Baker & Taylor Publisher Services (United States); Scholarly Book Services (Canada); Eurospan Group (Europe)
- Publication types: Books
- Official website: www.marquette.edu/mupress/

Marquette University Press is a university press affiliated with Marquette University, located in Milwaukee, Wisconsin. The press was established in 1916 and mostly publishes books that focus on philosophy, theology, and history. The Press was a founding member of the Association of Jesuit University Presses (AJUP).

== See also ==
- List of English-language book publishing companies
- List of university presses
