= Georgetown University Press =

American university press

- Parent company: Georgetown University
- Founded: 1964
- Country of origin: United States
- Headquarters location: Washington, D.C.
- Distribution: Hopkins Fulfillment Services (US) iGroup (Asia); Footprint Books (Australasia); Brunswick Books (Canada); NBN International (EMEA)
- Publication types: Books, Journals
- Official website: press.georgetown.edu

Georgetown University Press is a university press affiliated with Georgetown University that publishes about forty new books a year. The press's major subject areas include bioethics, international affairs, languages and linguistics, political science, public policy, and religion.

It was founded in 1964, and is a member of the Association of University Presses (AAUP) and a founding member of the Association of Jesuit University Presses (AJUP).

The press publishes the Al-Kitaab series, the most widely used set of Arabic language textbook series in the United States. It also publishes textbooks and digital materials for other languages including Spanish, Mandarin Chinese, Iraqi Arabic, Moroccan Arabic, Syrian Arabic, Portuguese, Tajik, and Uzbek.

== See also ==
- List of English-language book publishing companies
- List of university presses
