= Rockhurst University Press =

University press

- Parent company: Rockhurst University
- Country of origin: United States
- Headquarters location: Kansas City, Missouri
- Distribution: Fordham University Press
- Publication types: Books
- Official website: rockhurst.edu/press

Rockhurst University Press is a university press affiliated with Rockhurst University, a Jesuit university located in Kansas City, Missouri. The press's books—which largely focus on religion, history, and the humanities—are distributed by Fordham University Press. Rockhurst University Press was a founding member of the Association of Jesuit University Presses.

== See also ==
- List of English-language book publishing companies
- List of university presses
