= Battle of Verona (312) =

312 AD battle between Roman emperors Constrantine I and Maxentius

- Part of Civil wars of the Tetrarchy
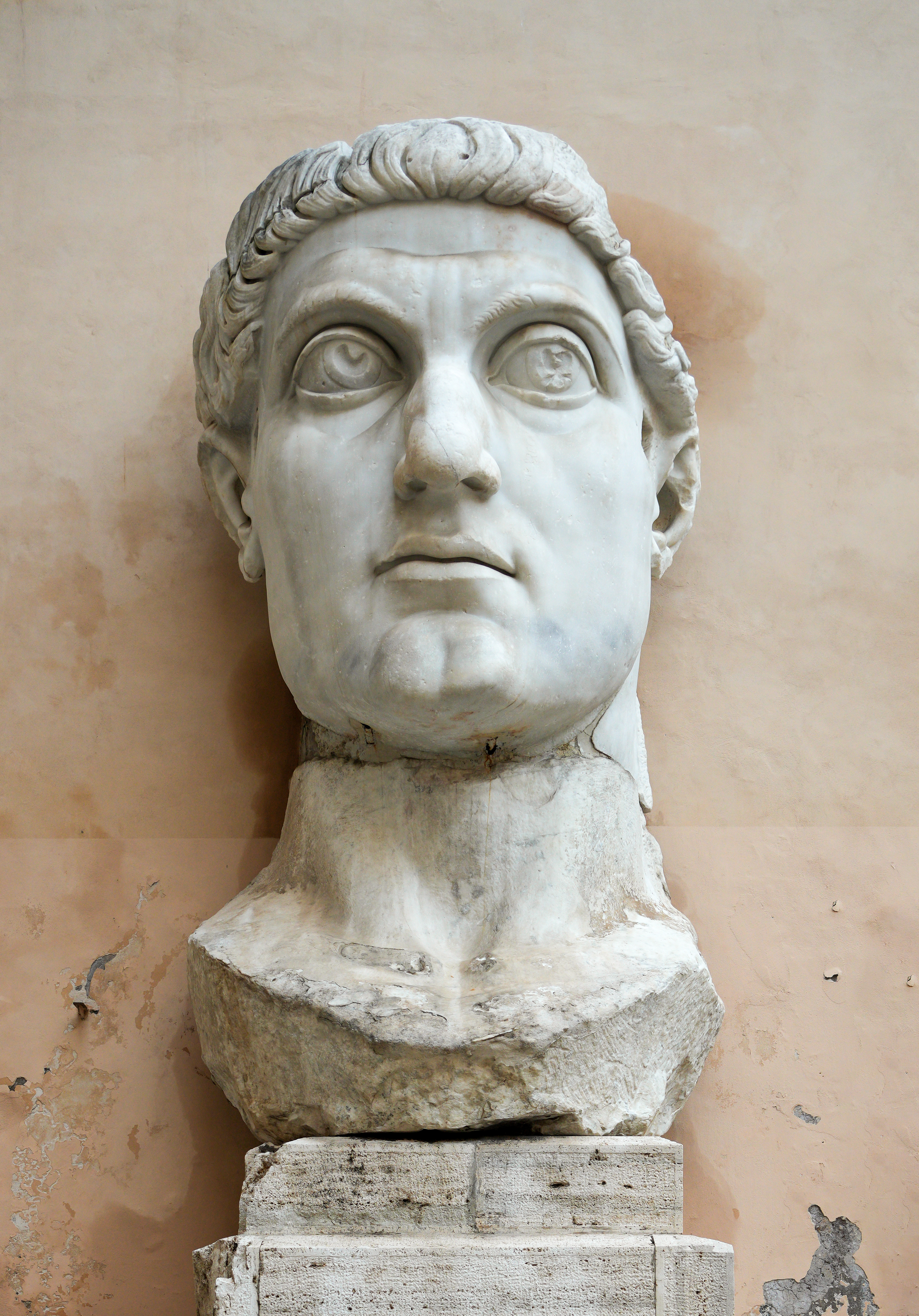
- Head of a colossal statue of Constantine I
Date	312
Location	Verona 45°26′00″N 10°59′00″E
Result	Constantinian victory

Belligerents
Constantinian forces	Maxentian forces

Commanders and leaders
Constantine the Great	Ruricius Pompeianus †
- Location within Italy Battle of Verona (312) (Mediterranean)

The Battle of Verona was fought in 312 between the forces of the Roman emperors Constantine I and Maxentius. Maxentius' forces were defeated, and Ruricius Pompeianus, the most senior Maxentian commander, was killed in the fighting.

== Background ==
In 312, Constantine saw his chance to invade Italy to end the usurpation of Maxentius. From Gaul he crossed the Alps into Italy. At the city of Segusium (Susa) he met some resistance when the defenders refused to open their gates for him. After a short siege the gates were fired and the city was taken; however, in order to gain the goodwill of the Italian population, Constantine directed his troops to extinguish the fires. The way to Italy lay open for him, and shortly afterwards he destroyed a Maxentian army, whose most prominent contingent was of heavy cavalry, at Turin. After this victory large areas of northern Italy, including the city of Milan, changed allegiance and Constantine was able to march further to the east where he routed an enemy cavalry force camped near Brescia.

== Battle ==
Following the defection of Milan to Constantine, the city of Verona became Maxentius' most important military strongpoint in the northern part of Italy. Verona was naturally strong as it sat in a loop of the River Adige, also its fortifications formed a formidable barrier to attack. Maxentius' most able general, the praetorian prefect Ruricius Pompeianus, had gathered a large army from the forces in the region of Venetia and concentrated it at Verona. Constantine arrayed his troops to begin a formal siege of Verona; however, Pompeianus led his army out to offer battle, whereupon Constantine's troops defeated them and forced them back into the city. Constantine then proceeded with his investment of Verona. Pompeianus managed to escape from the city before this was completed and rode east to gather reinforcements. He soon returned with a considerable army and placed Constantine in the difficult position of fighting on two fronts. Constantine responded by taking the offensive, he left a portion of his army to contain the garrison of the city, and with the remainder attacked Pompeianus' reinforcements. Constantine led this attack personally and his fearless example inspired a heroic effort from his soldiers. Pompeianus was killed in the resulting melee and his forces were swiftly routed. Maxentius' troops within the city were demoralised by the fate of the relieving army and soon capitulated.

There were so many prisoners of war that not enough chains could be found for them all; Constantine ordered that their swords be converted into fetters. After the battle, Constantine's officers beseeched him not to risk his life in battle again, for "he had exposed his own person with an excess of valour which almost degenerated into rashness".

== Aftermath ==
After the surrender of Verona all opposition to Constantine in the north of Italy collapsed. Furthermore, the cities in Etruria and Umbria declared for Constantine allowing him to march directly on Rome itself. At the Battle of the Milvian Bridge, immediately outside Rome, Constantine defeated Maxentius for the final time. Maxentius was killed during the battle and Constantine became ruler of the western half of the Roman Empire.

== See also ==
- Cornuti
