= Battle of the Milvian Bridge =

312 AD battle in the Civil Wars of the Tetrarchy

Coordinates: 41°56′08″N 12°28′01″E

Battle of Milvian Bridge
- Part of the civil wars of the Tetrarchy
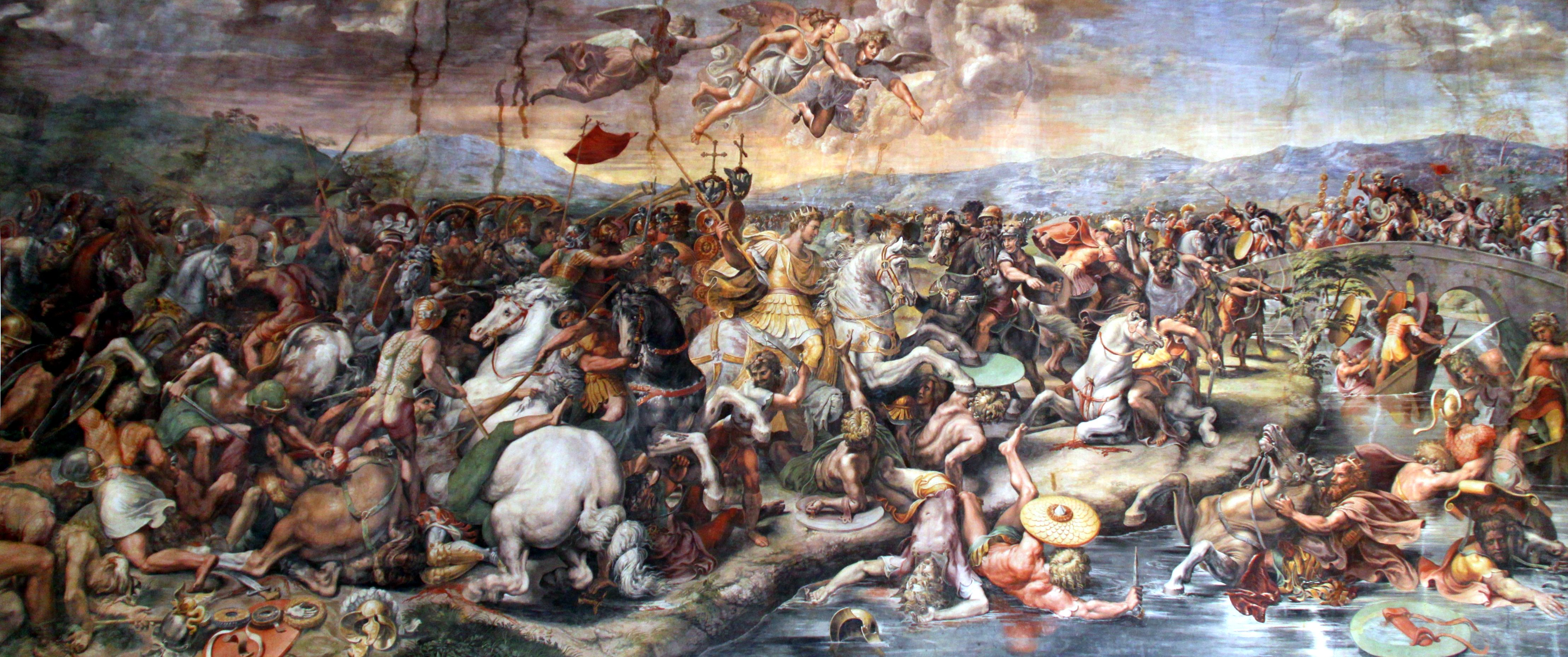
- The Battle of the Milvian Bridge (1520–24) by Giulio Romano
Date	28 October 312
Location	Ponte Milvio, Rome
Result	Constantinian victory

Belligerents
Constantinian forces	Maxentian forces

Commanders and leaders
Constantine the Great	Maxentius †

Units involved
Unknown	Praetorian Guard

Strength
20,000–25,000	25,000

Casualties and losses
Unknown	Heavy

The Battle of the Milvian Bridge took place between the Roman Emperors Constantine I and Maxentius on 28 October AD 312. It takes its name from the Milvian Bridge, an important route over the Tiber. Constantine won the battle and started on the path that led him to end the Tetrarchy and become the sole ruler of the Roman Empire. Maxentius drowned in the Tiber during the battle; his body was later taken from the river and decapitated, and his head was paraded through the streets of Rome on the day following the battle before being sent to Africa.

According to Christian chroniclers Eusebius of Caesarea and Lactantius, the battle marked the beginning of Constantine's conversion to Christianity. Eusebius of Caesarea recounts that Constantine and his soldiers had a vision sent by the Christian God. This was interpreted as a promise of victory if the sign of the Chi Rho, the first two letters of Christ's name in Greek, was painted on the soldiers' shields. The Arch of Constantine, erected in celebration of the victory, certainly attributes Constantine's success to divine intervention; however, the monument does not display any overtly Christian symbolism.

== Background ==
The underlying causes of the battle were the rivalries inherent in Diocletian's Tetrarchy. After Diocletian stepped down on 1 May 305, his successors began to struggle for control of the Roman Empire almost immediately. Although Constantine was the son of the Western Emperor Constantius, the Tetrarchic ideology did not necessarily provide for hereditary succession. When Constantius died on 25 July 306, his father's troops proclaimed Constantine as Augustus in Eboracum (York). In Rome, the favorite was Maxentius, the son of Constantius' imperial colleague Maximian, who seized the title of emperor on 28 October 306. But whereas Constantine's claim was recognized by Galerius, ruler of the Eastern provinces and the senior emperor in the Empire, Maxentius was treated as a usurper. Galerius, however, recognized Constantine as holding only the lesser imperial rank of Caesar. Galerius ordered his co-Augustus, Severus, to put Maxentius down in early 307. Once Severus arrived in Italy, however, his army defected to Maxentius. Severus was captured, imprisoned, and executed. Galerius himself marched on Rome in the autumn, but failed to take the city. Constantine avoided conflict with both Maxentius and the Eastern emperors for most of this period.

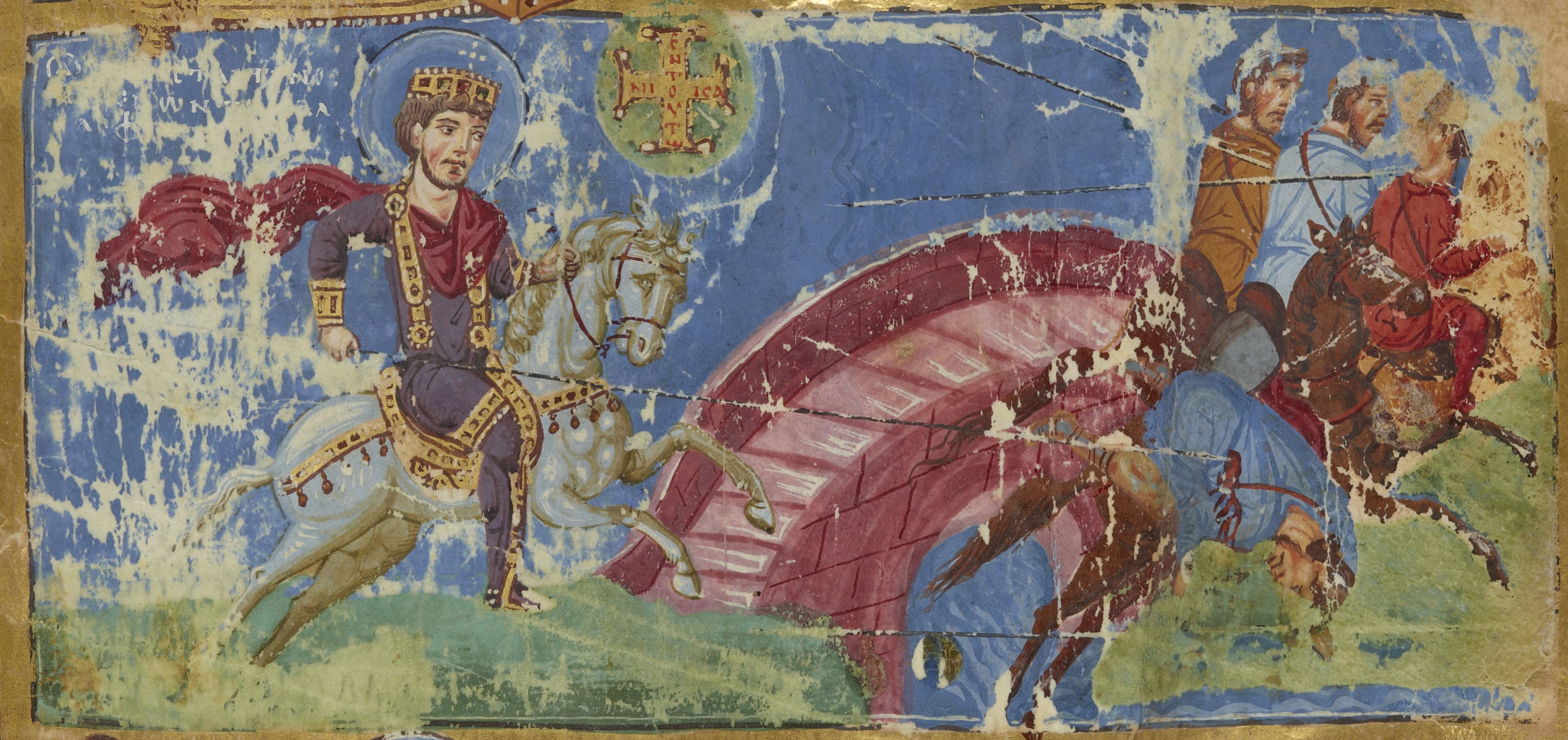
Constantine's Vision and the Battle of the Milvian Bridge from Greek manuscript (879–883 AD) of the homilies of Gregory of Nazianzus

By 312, however, Constantine and Maxentius were engaged in open hostility with one another, although they were brothers-in‑law through Constantine's marriage to Fausta, sister of Maxentius. In the spring of 312, Constantine gathered an army of around 40,000 soldiers (although the ancient historian Zosimus "claimed, quite implausibly, that Constantine invaded Italy with 90,000 soldiers and 8,000 cavalry, and that Maxentius commanded an army of 170,000 soldiers and 18,000 cavalry, including 80,000 Italians and 40,000 Carthaginians") and decided to oust Maxentius himself. He easily overran northern Italy, winning two major battles: the first near Turin, the second at Verona, where the praetorian prefect Ruricius Pompeianus, Maxentius' most senior general, was killed.

=== Vision of Constantine ===
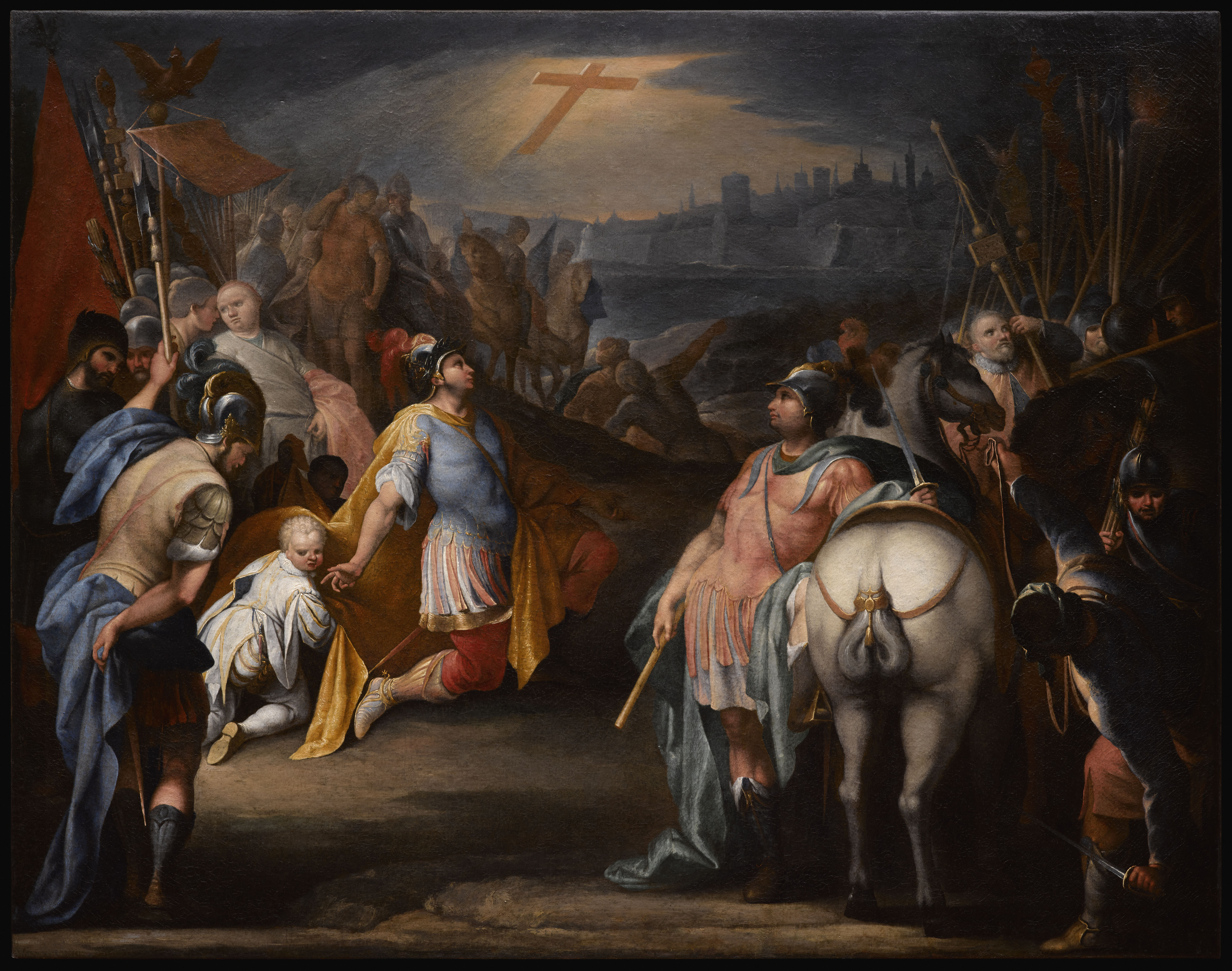
La vision de Constantin by Jacob Punel (ca. 17th century).

It is commonly understood that on the evening of 27 October with the armies preparing for battle, Constantine had a vision which led him to fight under the protection of the Christian God. Some details of that vision, however, differ between the sources reporting it.

Lactantius states that, on the night before the battle, Constantine was commanded in a dream to "delineate the heavenly sign on the shields of his soldiers" (On the Deaths of the Persecutors 44.5). He followed the commands of his dream and marked the shields with a sign "denoting Christ". Lactantius seems to describe that sign as a "staurogram", or a Latin cross with its upper end rounded in a P-like fashion, though his wording is imprecise. There is no certain evidence that Constantine ever used that sign, as opposed to the better known Chi-Rho sign described by Eusebius.

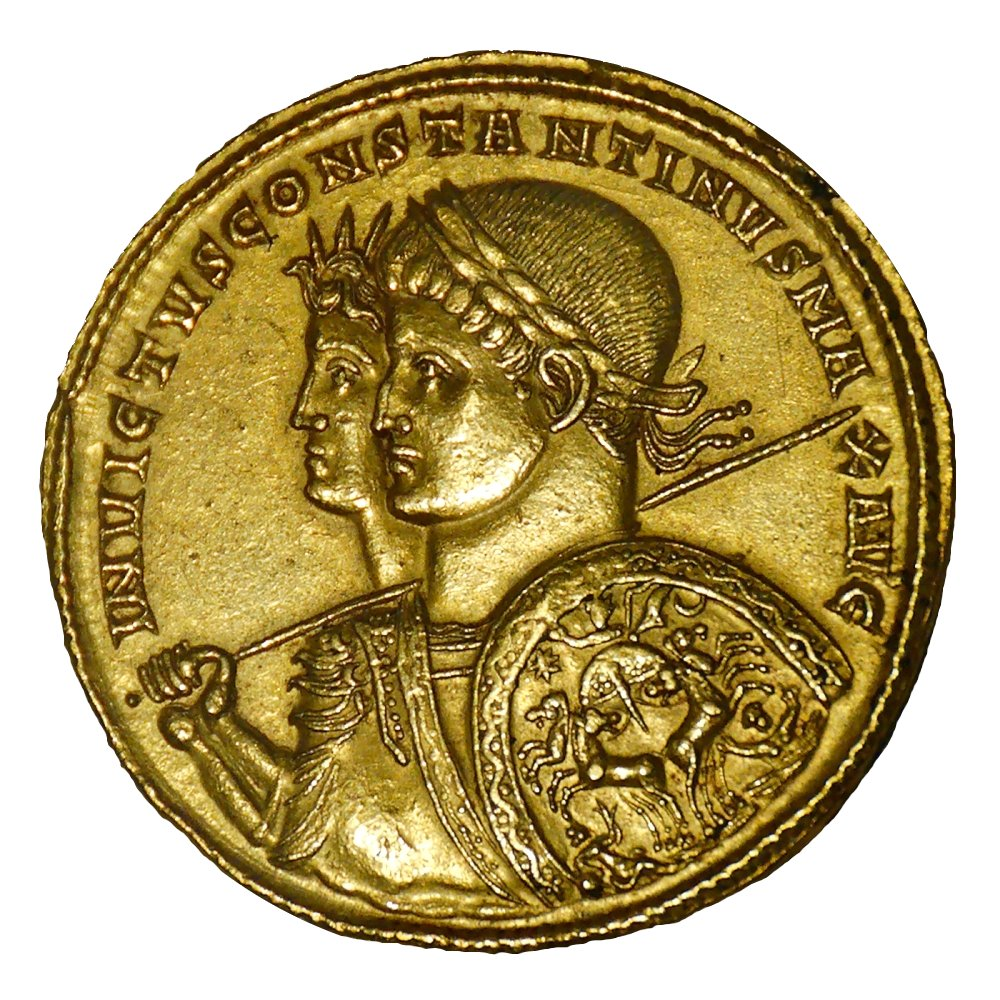
A coin struck in 313, depicting Constantine as the companion of a solar deity

From Eusebius, two accounts of the battle survive. The first, shorter one in the Ecclesiastical History promotes the belief that the Christian God helped Constantine but does not mention any vision. In his later Life of Constantine, Eusebius gives a detailed account of a vision and stresses that he had heard the story from the Emperor himself. According to this version, Constantine with his army was marching (Eusebius does not specify the actual location of the event, but it was clearly not in the camp at Rome), when he looked up to the sun and saw a cross of light above it, and with it the Greek words "Ἐν Τούτῳ Νίκα", En toutōi níka, usually translated into Latin as "in hoc signo vinces". The literal meaning of the phrase in Greek is "in this (sign), conquer" while in Latin it's "in this sign, you shall conquer"; a more free translation would be "Through this sign [you shall] conquer". At first he was unsure of the meaning of the apparition, but in the following night he had a dream in which Christ explained to him that he should use the sign against his enemies. Eusebius then continues to describe the labarum, the military standard used by Constantine in his later wars against Licinius, showing the Chi-Rho sign.

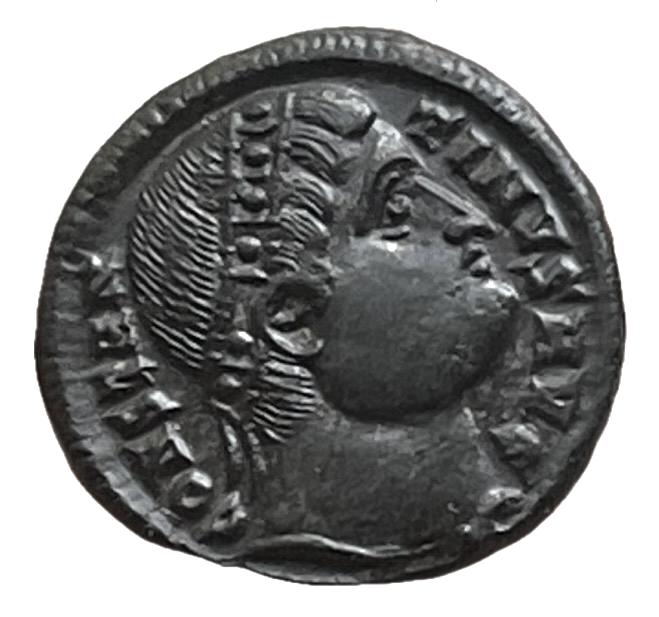
Follis depicting Constantine the Great with his eyes raised to heaven, minted in Heraclea circa 327–329 AD, commemorating his vision at the Milvian Bridge.

The accounts of the two contemporary authors, though not entirely consistent, have been merged into a popular notion of Constantine seeing the Chi-Rho sign on the evening before the battle. Both authors agree that the sign was not widely understandable to denote Christ (although among the Christians, it was already being used in the catacombs along with other special symbols to mark and/or decorate Christian tombs). Its first imperial appearance is on a Constantinian silver coin from c. 317, which proves that Constantine did use the sign at that time, though not very prominently. He made more extensive use of the Chi-Rho and the Labarum later, during the conflict with Licinius.

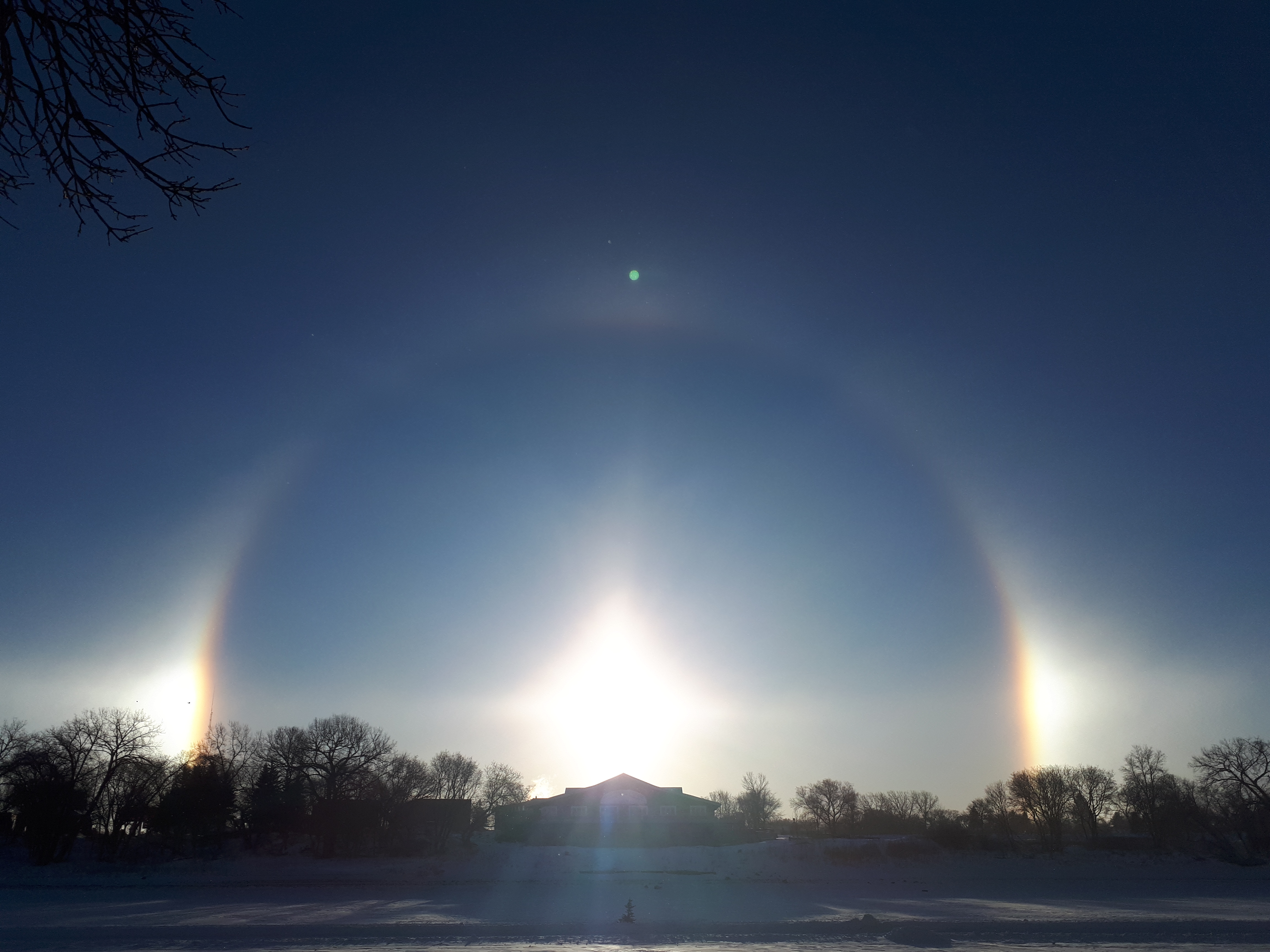
The description from 28 October 312, "A cross centered on the Sun", fits with the atmospheric optical phenomenon of a sun dog.

Some have considered the vision in a solar context (e.g. as a solar halo phenomenon called a sun dog), which may have preceded the Christian beliefs later expressed by Constantine. Coins of Constantine depicting him as the companion of a solar deity were minted as late as 313, the year following the battle. The solar deity Sol Invictus is often pictured with a nimbus or halo. Various emperors portrayed Sol Invictus on their official coinage, with a wide range of legends, only a few of which incorporated the epithet invictus, such as the legend SOLI INVICTO COMITI, claiming the Unconquered Sun as a companion to the emperor, used with particular frequency by Constantine. Constantine's official coinage continues to bear images of Sol until 325/6. A solidus of Constantine as well as a gold medallion from his reign depict the Emperor's bust in profile jugate with Sol Invictus, with the legend INVICTUS CONSTANTINUS. The official cults of Sol Invictus and Sol Invictus Mithras were popular amongst the soldiers of the Roman Army. Statuettes of Sol Invictus, carried by the standard-bearers, appear in three places in reliefs on the Arch of Constantine. Constantine's triumphal arch was carefully positioned to align with the colossal statue of Sol by the Colosseum, so that Sol formed the dominant backdrop when seen from the direction of the main approach towards the arch.

However, other historians have discounted Eusebius's later account of a vision entirely. John Julius Norwich argued that "the vision of the Cross above the battlefield ... never occurred. Had it done so, it is unthinkable that there should not be a single reference to it in any of the contemporary histories until the Life of Constantine", and that Eusebius's "specific statement that 'the whole army ... witnessed the miracle'" is implausible. On the other hand, Norwich did concede that shortly before the battle, Constantine must have undergone "some profound spiritual experience", and that Eusebius's story was likely not so much "a deliberate falsehood" as "a possibly unconscious exaggeration", with Constantine adding "a gentle gloss" to his recollections which the author then uncritically noted down or embellished.

== Battle ==
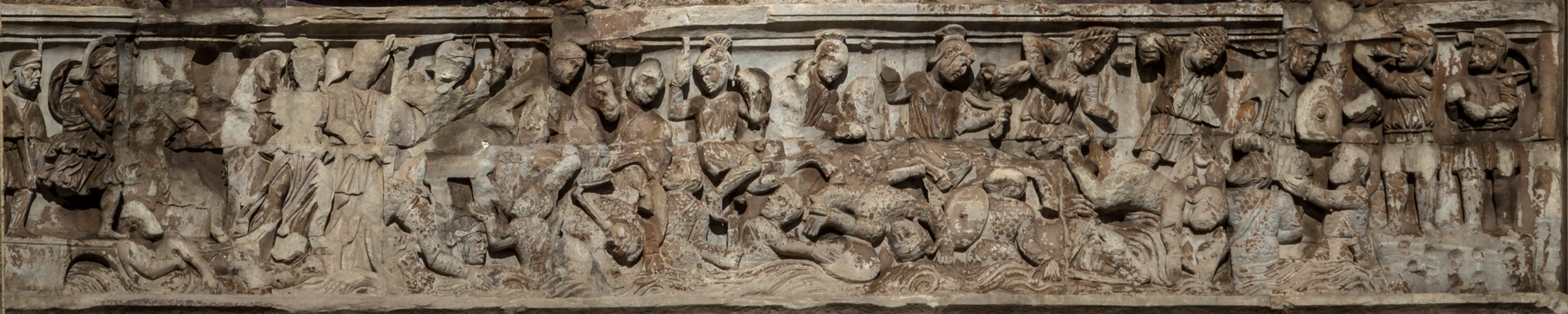
A contemporary image of the battle from the Arch of Constantine, Rome. In the frieze, Constantine's cavalry drive Maxentius' troops into the waters of the Tiber.

Constantine reached Rome at the end of October 312 approaching along the Via Flaminia. He camped at the location of Malborghetto near Prima Porta, where remains of a Constantinian monument, the Arch of Malborghetto, which was built in honour of the occasion, are still extant.

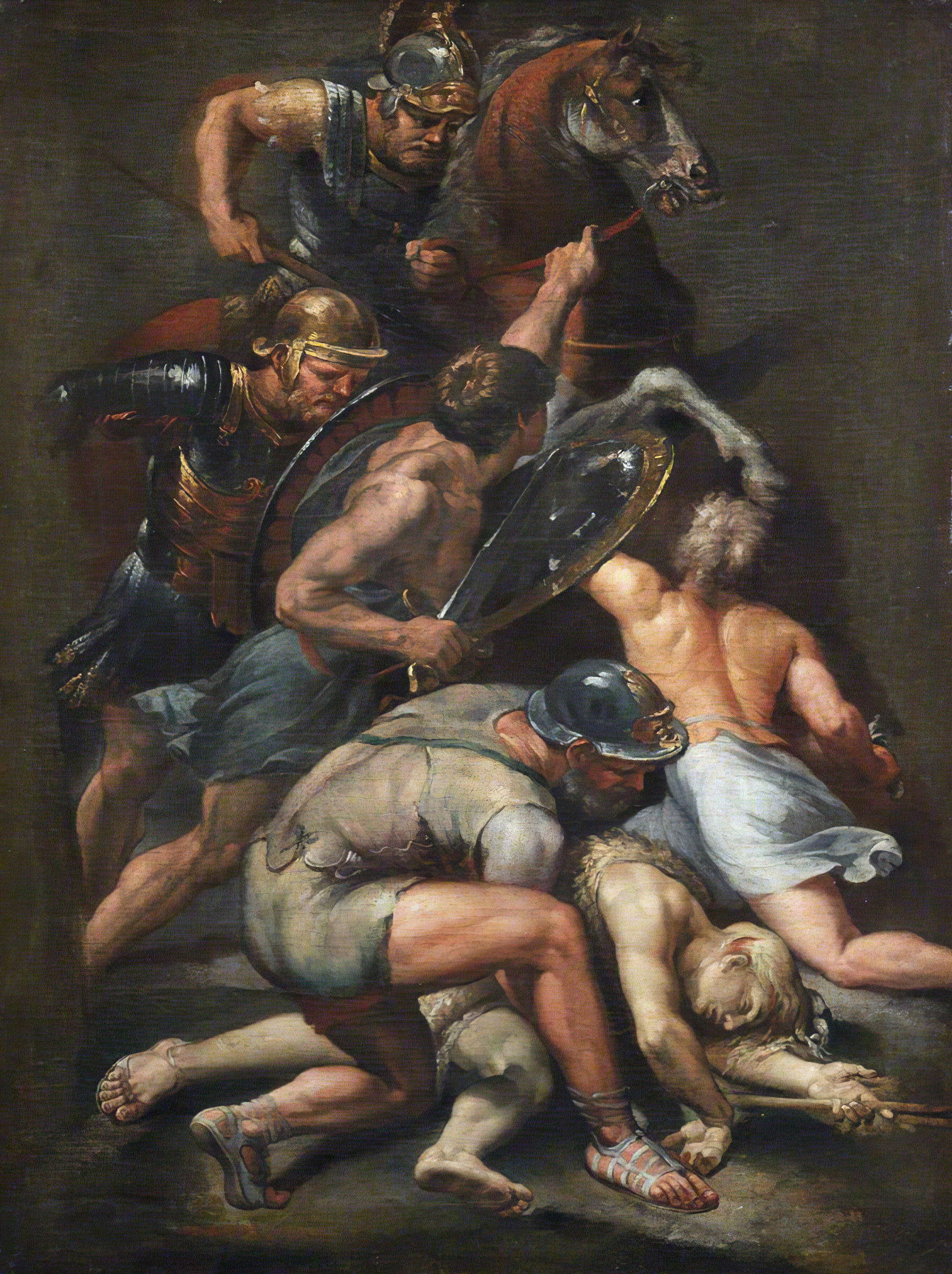
Battle of Constantine and Maxentius (detail of fresco in the Vatican Museums) c1650 by Lazzaro Baldi after Giulio Romano at the University of Edinburgh

It was expected that Maxentius would remain within Rome and endure a siege; he had successfully employed this strategy twice before, during the invasions of Severus and Galerius. Indeed, Maxentius had organised the stockpiling of large amounts of food in the city in preparation for such an event. Surprisingly, he decided otherwise, choosing to meet Constantine in open battle. Ancient sources commenting on these events attribute this decision either to divine intervention (Lactantius and Eusebius, both of whom were Christians) or superstition (Zosimus, who was a pagan). They also note that the day of the battle was the same as the day of his accession (28 October), which was generally thought to be a good omen. Additionally, Maxentius is reported to have consulted the oracular Sibylline Books, which stated that "on October 28 an enemy of the Romans would perish". Maxentius interpreted this prophecy as being favourable to himself. Lactantius also reports that the populace supported Constantine with acclamations during circus games. Maxentius chose to make his stand in front of the Milvian Bridge, a stone bridge that carries the Via Flaminia road across the Tiber River into Rome (the bridge stands today at the same site, somewhat remodelled, named in Italian Ponte Milvio or sometimes Ponte Molle, "soft bridge"). Holding it was essential if Maxentius was to keep his rival out of Rome, where the Senate would surely favour whoever held the city. As Maxentius had probably partially destroyed the bridge during his preparations for a siege, he had a wooden or pontoon bridge constructed to get his army across the river. The sources vary as to the nature of the bridge central to the events of the battle. Zosimus mentions it, vaguely, as being constructed in two parts connected by iron fastenings, while others indicate that it was a pontoon bridge; sources are also unclear as to whether the bridge was deliberately constructed as a collapsible trap for Constantine's forces or not.

The next day, the two armies clashed, and Constantine won a decisive victory. The dispositions of Maxentius may have been faulty as his troops seem to have been arrayed with the River Tiber too close to their rear, giving them little space to allow re-grouping in the event of their formations being forced to give ground. Already known as a skillful general, Constantine first launched his cavalry at the cavalry of Maxentius and broke them. Constantine's infantry then advanced; most of Maxentius's troops fought well but they began to be pushed back toward the Tiber. Maxentius then decided to order a retreat, intending to make another stand at Rome itself. However, there was only one escape route, via the bridge. Constantine's men inflicted heavy losses on the retreating army. Finally, the temporary bridge set up alongside the Milvian Bridge, over which many of the Maxentian troops were escaping, collapsed, and those stranded on the north bank of the Tiber were either taken prisoner or killed. Maxentius' Praetorian Guard, who had originally acclaimed him emperor, seemed to have made a stubborn stand on the northern bank of the river; "in despair of pardon they covered with their bodies the place which they had chosen for combat."

Maxentius was among the dead, having drowned in the river while trying to swim across it in an attempt to escape or, alternatively, he is described as having been thrown by his horse into the river. Lactantius describes the death of Maxentius in the following manner: "The bridge in his rear was broken down. At sight of that the battle grew hotter. The hand of the Lord prevailed, and the forces of Maxentius were routed. He fled towards the broken bridge; but the multitude pressing on him, he was driven headlong into the Tiber."

== Aftermath ==
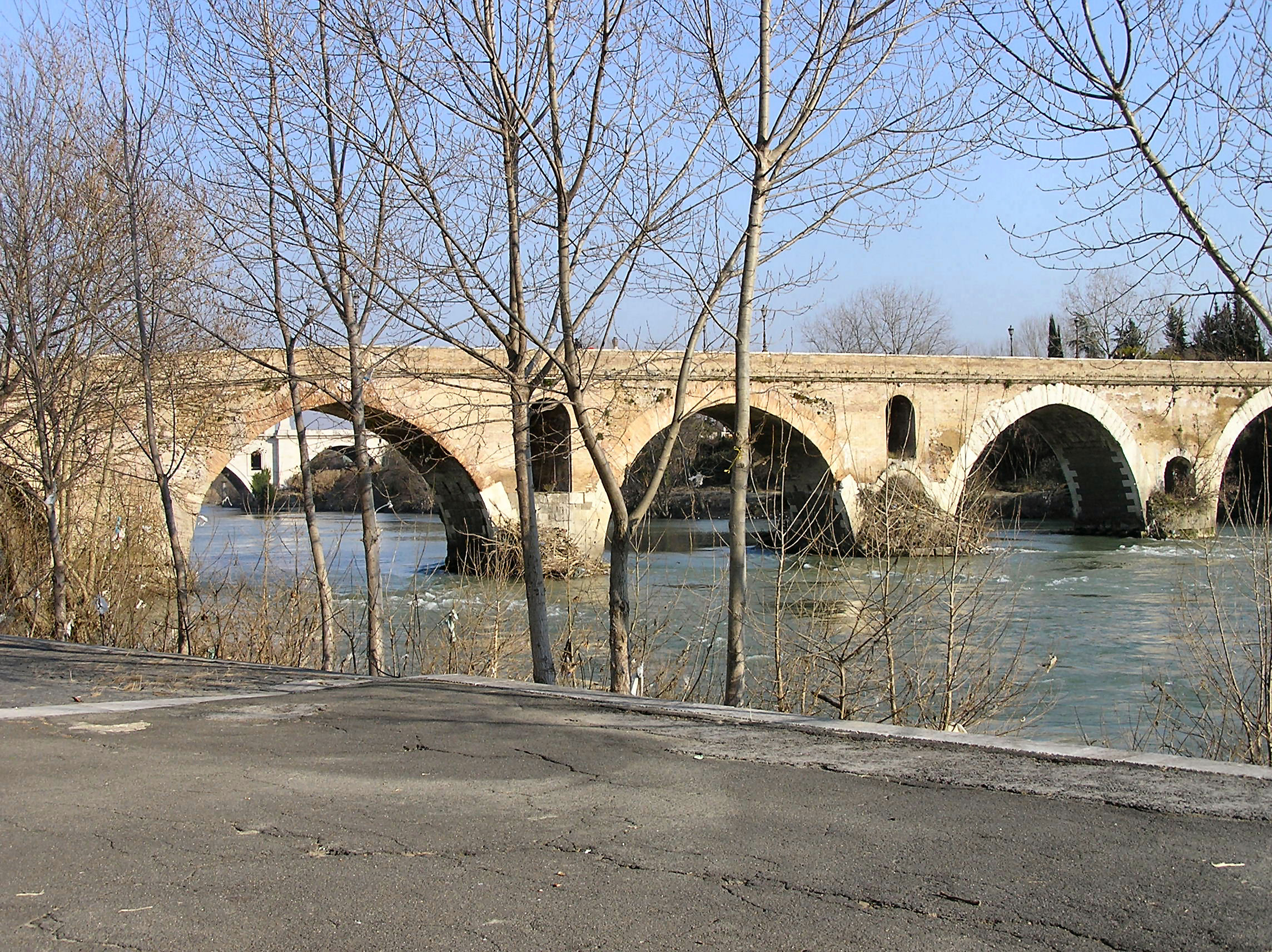
The Milvian Bridge

Constantine entered Rome on 29 October. He staged a grand arrival ceremony in the city (adventus), and was met with popular jubilation. Maxentius' body was fished out of the Tiber and decapitated. His head was paraded through the streets for all to see. After the ceremonies, Maxentius' head was sent to Carthage as proof of his downfall; Africa then offered no further resistance. The battle gave Constantine undisputed control of the western half of the Roman Empire. The descriptions of Constantine's entry into Rome omit mention of him ending his procession at the Temple of Capitoline Jupiter, where sacrifice was usually offered. Though often employed to show Constantine's Christian sensibilities, this silence cannot be taken as proof that Constantine was a Christian at this point. He chose to honour the Senatorial Curia with a visit, where he promised to restore its ancestral privileges and give it a secure role in his reformed government: there would be no revenge against Maxentius' supporters. Maxentius was condemned to damnatio memoriae; all his legislation was invalidated and Constantine usurped all of Maxentius' considerable building projects within Rome, including the Temple of Romulus and the Basilica of Maxentius. Maxentius' strongest supporters in the military were neutralized when the Praetorian Guard and Imperial Horse Guard (equites singulares) were disbanded. Constantine is thought to have replaced the former imperial guards with a number of cavalry units termed the Scholae Palatinae.

== Significance ==
Paul K. Davis writes that, "Constantine’s victory gave him total control of the Western Roman Empire paving the way for Christianity to become the dominant religion for the Roman Empire and ultimately for Europe." The following year, 313, Constantine and Licinius issued the Edict of Milan, which made Christianity an officially recognised and tolerated religion in the Roman Empire.

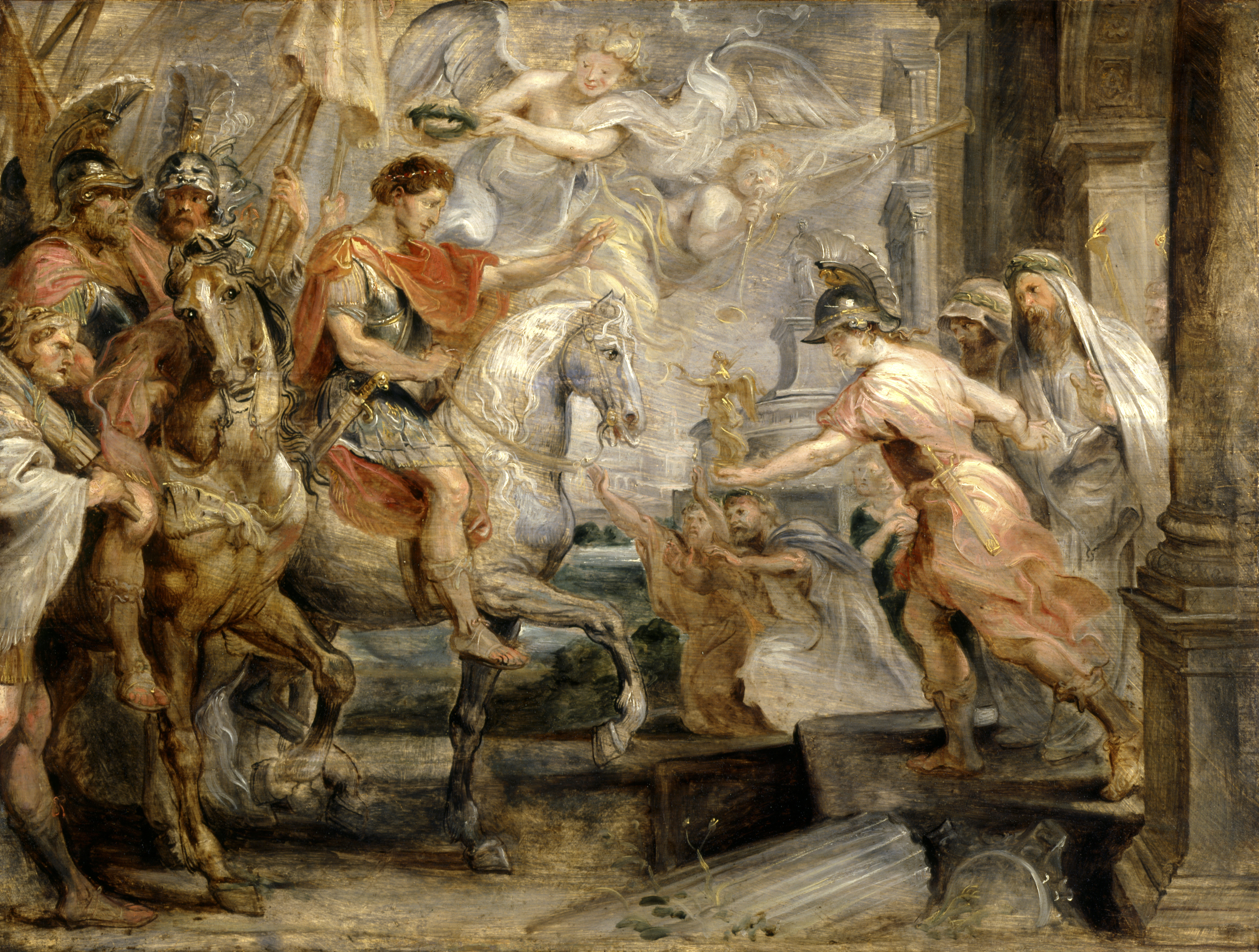
Constantine enters Rome in triumph by Peter Paul Rubens (ca. 1621).
