= Ruricius Pompeianus =

Roman Praetorian prefect and Commander of cavalry and infantry

- Died: 312; Verona
- Military career
- Allegiance: Roman Empire
- Rank: Praetorian prefect
- Conflicts: Battle of Brescia (312); Battle of Verona (312)

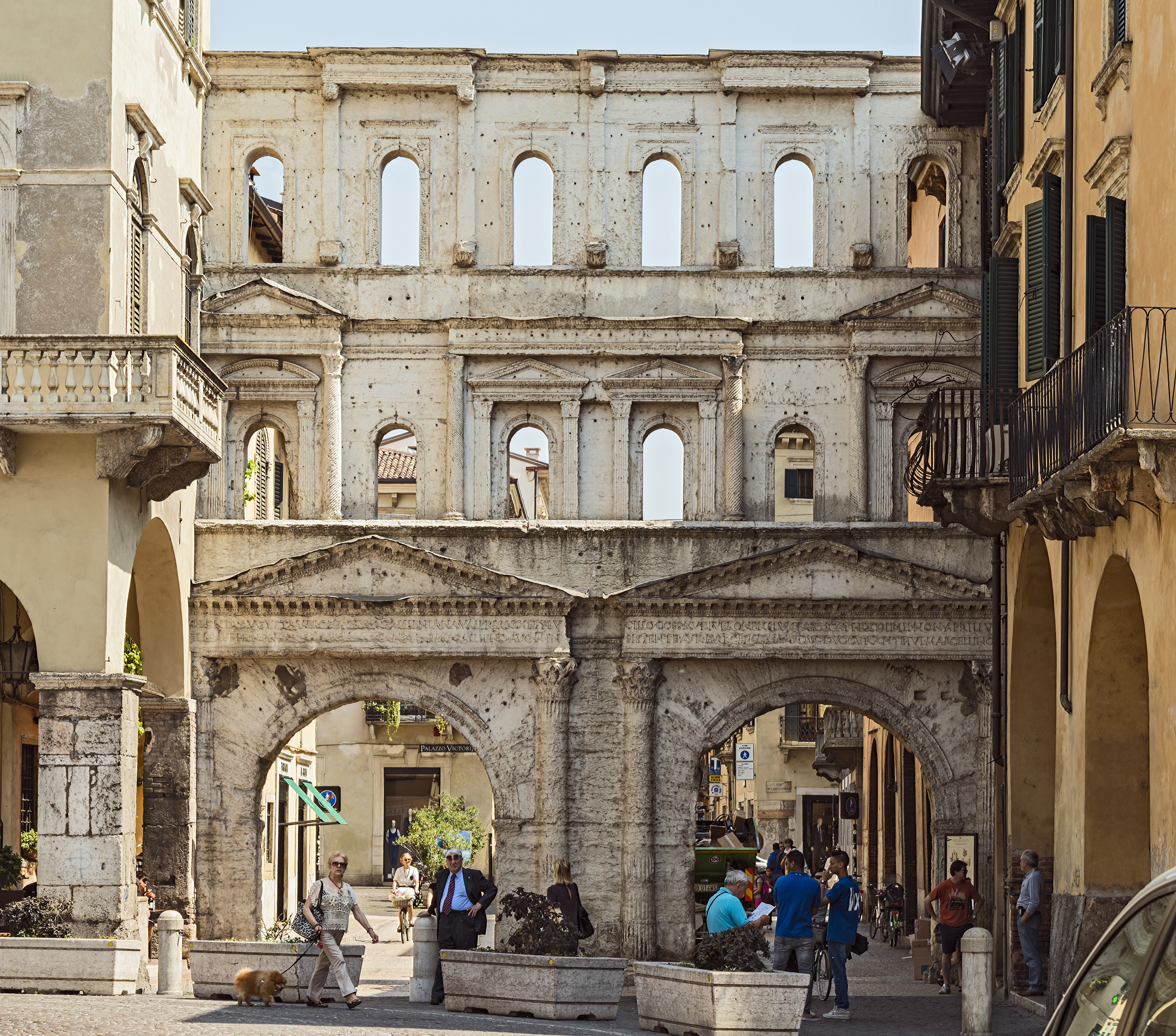
Porta Borsari, one of the Roman gates at Verona.

Ruricius Pompeianus (died 312 in Verona) was Praetorian prefect and Commander of cavalry and infantry under Maxentius, Western Roman Emperor. While guarding the Adige and Po Rivers with the ample and well-directed forces of the province of Venetia, Pompeianus was killed by Constantine I's troops during the desperately fought Battle of Verona (312).

Pompeianus is mentioned only briefly in two accounts of Constantine's campaign against Maxentius. In a panegyric from the year 313, he is called "Pompeianus". In the second source, also one of the Panegyrici Latini, by Nazarius, his name is given as "Ruricius". As it is clearly the same person, the conflict is usually resolved by combining the names into "Ruricius Pompeianus".

== See also ==
- Siege of Segusio
