= Adventus (ceremony) =

Roman celebration of the arrival of the Emperor to a city

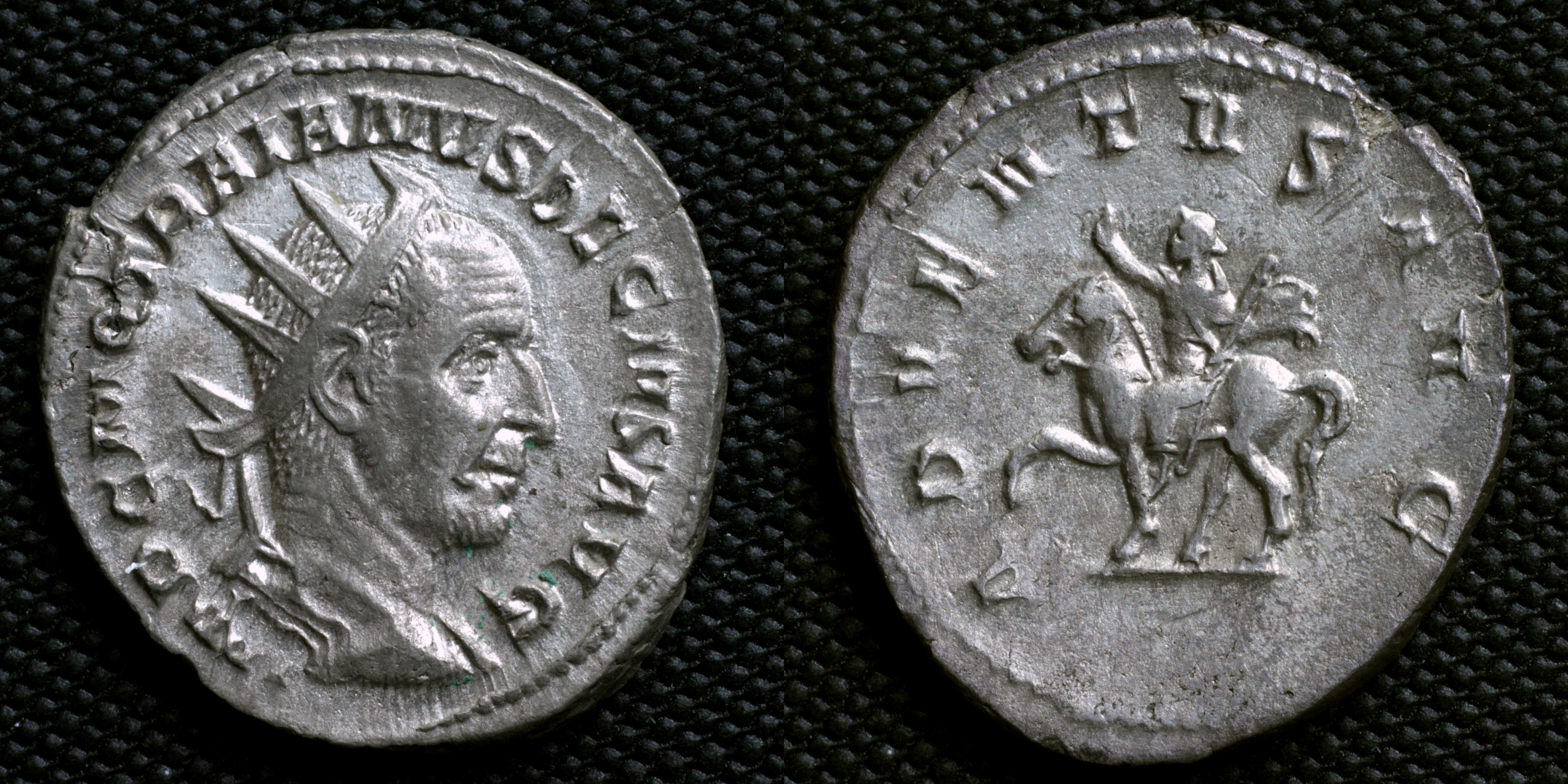

First side of the image: O: draped and cuirassed bust with radiate crown of Trajan Decius IMP C M Q TRAIANVS DECIVS AVG
Second side of the image: R: Trajan Decius riding horse, raising hand and holding scepter ADVENTVS AVG
silver antoninianus struck in Rome 250 AD; ref.: RIC 11b; RSC 4 This coin was struck to the occasion of emperor's return (adventus) to Rome.

In the Roman Empire during Late Antiquity, the adventus (Ancient Greek: ἀπάντησις, romanized: apántēsis, lit. 'escort') was a ceremony held to celebrate the arrival (Latin: adventus) at a city of a Roman emperor or other dignitaries. The imperial adventus was the period's "ceremonial par excellence", celebrating both the emperor's arrival and the blessing of the imperial presence itself on the city's security. The term is also used to refer to artistic depictions (usually in relief sculpture, including coins) of such ceremonies.

The city would be decorated for the occasion, a public procession would come out of the city to meet and welcome the honorand on the road, and after ritually escorting them into town, a panegyric would be delivered in their honour, followed by a festival and games. Its 'opposite' was the profectio. Besides the emperors, governors of the Roman provinces and bishops could be received by an adventus.

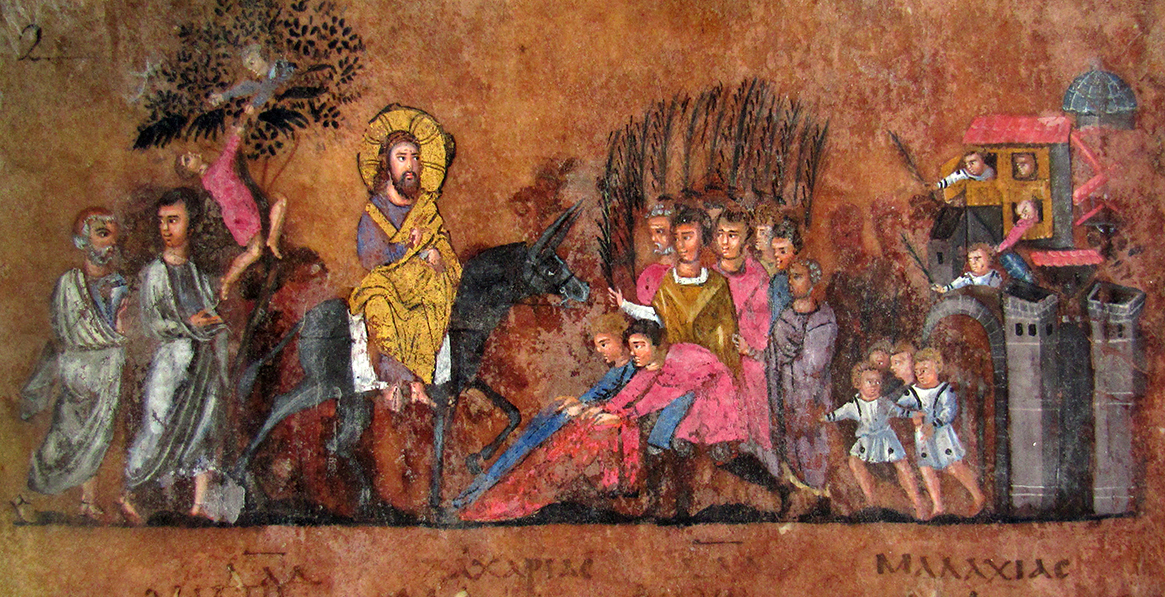
The "adventus" of Christ into Jerusalem in the 6th-century Rossano Gospels

For an emperor, especially one having newly acceded or usurped power, celebrating an adventus confirmed the legitimacy of the ruler, demonstrating the consent (Latin: consensus) of the governed city's people, and the events were reproduced and symbolized in imperial iconography and art. From the time of Constantine the Great's (r. 306–337) arrival in Rome after defeating his rival Augustus Maxentius (r. 306–312) at the Battle of the Milvian Bridge, the adventus ceremonies of the emperors took on characteristics of the Roman triumph and were associated with the triumphal entry into Jerusalem by Jesus of Nazareth described in the gospels of the New Testament. Christian relics were sometimes also honoured with an adventus ceremony during a translation to a city.

The two major elements of the adventus were the rituals of occursus and propompe. The occursus (Ancient Greek: συνάντησις, romanized: synántēsis, lit. 'meeting' or Ancient Greek: ὑπάντησις, romanized: hypántēsis, lit. 'coming to meet') consisted of the ritual procession to meet the approaching honorand on the road; the size, composition, and distance from the city of the welcoming party was determined by the guest's rank and status. Then, the propompe was the festive escort of the honorand into the city. The delivery of panegyric in honour of the occasion and in praise of the arrival was an enduring fixture, as were acclamations, hymns, poetry, music, lights, decorations and incense. Religious shrines would be visited en route, and afterwards a banquet was probably held.

For comparable ceremonies in Medieval and Early Modern Europe, sometimes employing consciously 'Roman' iconology, see royal entry.

== See also ==
- Parousia
- Advent
