= University of Scranton Press =

- Parent company: University of Scranton
- Status: Inactive
- Founded: 1988
- Country of origin: United States
- Headquarters location: Scranton, Pennsylvania
- Distribution: Chicago Distribution Center
- Publication types: Books

The University of Scranton Press was the university press of the University of Scranton, headquartered on its campus in Scranton, Pennsylvania. The press published more than 200 books and other publications between 1988 and 2010. The majority of the University of Scranton Press' catalog are scholarly works dealing with religious issues, such Catholicism, Judaism and the Jesuit tradition, as well as regional issues specifically related to Northeastern Pennsylvania. The University of Scranton Press published approximately 24 publications annually at its height.

== History ==
The University of Scranton Press was founded in 1988 by Reverend Richard W. Rousseau, S.J., who served as the chairman of the university's Department of Theology and Religious Studies at the time. In the mid-1990s, Father Richard Rousseau hired Trinka Ravaioli, a graphic designer, to design the covers for its publications. Ravaioli continued to design most of the covers for the books published by the University of Scranton Press from the mid-1990s until the press ceased publication in 2010.

Approximately one-third of the press' books and other publications dealt directly with issues related to Northeastern Pennsylvania, including its history, culture and economy. Many of the books were written or submitted by local authors and writers based in the region. Titles related to Catholicism, with an emphasis on Jesuit issues, constituted most of the rest of the press' catalog.

The press was housed in the University of Scranton's Smurfit Art Center, a former Universalist church purchased by the university in 1987. The University of Scranton Press is a founding member of the Association of Jesuit University Presses, but was not a current member of the Association of American University Presses as of 2010.

Some of the University of Scranton Press' most recent publications included a biography of Edith Stein and a book exploring the lives of early 20th Century European immigrant coal miners in Pennsylvania.

== Closure ==
The University of Scranton Press began declining the submission of new works in early 2010. In August 2010, the University of Scranton's provost and vice president for academic affairs, Harold Baillie, announced that the press would close at the end of summer 2010. Baillie cited cost-cutting measures and changing financial priorities for the decision to close the university's scholarly publisher, "Basically, it was a budgetary decision. We are a tuition-driven institution, and these are tough economic times...Our main priority is the education of our students, and that takes precedence in the distribution of our resources."

== See also ==
- List of English-language book publishing companies
- List of university presses
