= Intervarsity =

Intervarsity, Inter Varsity or Inter-Varsity may refer to:

- All-Asian Intervarsity Debating Championships, now merged to form the United Asian Debating Championships.
- Australasian Intervarsity Debating Championships
- Australian Intervarsity Choral Societies Association
- InterVarsity Christian Fellowship/USA
- Inter-Varsity Christian Fellowship of Canada
- Universities and Colleges Christian Fellowship, formerly the Inter-Varsity Fellowship of Evangelical Unions
- InterVarsity Choral Festival (Australia)
- InterVarsity Choral Festival (Canada)
- Inter Varsity Dance Competition
- InterVarsity Hockey, Field Hockey competitions in Australia between rival universities
- Inter Varsity Folk Dance Festival
- Inter-Varsity Press

== See also ==
- Varsity (disambiguation)
