= Cambridge Inter-Collegiate Christian Union =

The Cambridge Inter-Collegiate Christian Union, usually known as CICCU, is the University of Cambridge's most prominent student Christian organisation, and was the first university Christian Union to have been founded. It was formed in 1877, but can trace its origins back to the formation of the Jesus Lane Sunday School in 1827 and the Cambridge Prayer Union in 1848. CICCU's stated purpose is "to make Jesus Christ known to students in Cambridge".

CICCU is a registered charity.

Students in many other universities followed Cambridge's lead in forming their own Christian Unions, beginning with OICCU being founded in Oxford in 1879. CICCU was an early member of the Student Christian Movement, which it left in 1910 to provide a specifically conservative evangelical ministry in Cambridge. Again, OICCU and other Unions followed them in this move, and together they founded the Inter-Varsity Fellowship of Evangelical Unions in 1928, which is now the Universities and Colleges Christian Fellowship or UCCF. UCCF spread to Canada in the same year and later to the United States, Australia (Australian Fellowship of Evangelical Students), New Zealand (Tertiary Students Christian Fellowship) and in 1947 across the globe as the International Fellowship of Evangelical Students.

== Membership declaration ==
Students who become members of CICCU are asked to sign the following statement, "I desire in joining this Union to declare my faith in Jesus Christ as my Saviour, my Lord and my God". This was one of the issues in the dispute with the SCM.

== Leadership ==
CICCU is led by Christian students from a wide variety of backgrounds, united in a common desire to "make Jesus Christ known to students in Cambridge." Past CICCU members have included Josh Moody, Basil Atkinson, Helen Roseveare, John W. Wenham, John Stott, Gordon Wenham, David Wenham, Hugh G. M. Williamson and Vaughan Roberts. The leadership operates on two levels – university wide and within colleges. A committee of eight students, known as the Exec organise CICCU. Two reps in each college lead college events and meetings.

== Events ==
There are weekly meetings in almost every college during term time – these include Bible study, prayer and praise. The college groups then meet together as a whole for Bible Teaching and prayer each week. The CICCU organises weekly talks, explaining what Christians believe, and discussion groups (Christianity Explored courses). The college groups organise termly events in the colleges where people can come and find out more about Christianity. Every year there is a high-publicity main event, during which events are held in most of the colleges and there are lunchtime and evening talks.

Currently CICCU runs two main outreach activities – 'Events Week' in Lent term, and 'Big Questions' lunches on Fridays in St Andrew the Great which feature short talks and Q&As about questions of life and faith – along with a variety of occasional events, and bigger activities in colleges.

== Doctrinal basis ==
CICCU adopts the doctrinal basis of the UCCF, to which it is affiliated.

== Controversy ==
Attitudes towards homosexuality have been a particular area of controversy, in particular during their 2004 Promise Week event, in which it was alleged that homosexual relations were equated with bestiality. CICCU members deny that their organisation is anti-gay, stressing "equality in the sight of God", and point out that they love homosexual and heterosexual friends equally, as does God.

Comment on the CICCU during the 2010s was more ambivalent – surprised by the intense focus on sharing rather than simply maintaining their faith, but impressed by the warmth of their welcome, and the depth of their conviction.

== Presidents ==
- 1877: A. Coote
- W. Mitchell-Carruthers
- 1877–78: J.C. Taylor
- 1878–79: G.H. Pole
- 1879–80: J. Harford-Battersby
- 1880–82: Names lost
- 1882–83: J.E.K. Studd
- 1883–84: I.B. Wane
- 1884–85: Hon. W.G. Scott
- 1885–86: E.D.M. Hamilton
- 1886–87: A. Klein
- 1887–88: R.M. Webb-Peploe
- 1888–89: D.W. Carr
- 1889–90: A. Rouse
- 1890–91: L.F.D. Blair
- 1891–92: C.T. Horan
- 1892–93: N. Bennett
- 1893–94: A.H. Swann
- 1894–95: F.T. Woods
- 1895–96: A.G. Dodderidge
- 1896–97: H.F. Buxton
- 1897–98: D.R. Barclay
- 1898–99: T.W. Thompson
- 1899–1900: J. Stenhouse
- 1900–01: W.G. Hardie
- 1901–02: R. Hodgkin
- 1902–03: S. Donnithorne
- 1903–04: G.A. Barclay
- 1904–05: D.P. Robinson (afterwards Brereton)
- 1905–06: J.R.S. Taylor
- 1906–07: A.E. Bradley
- 1907–08: R.L. Pelly
- 1908–09: H.N. Rodgers
- 1909–10: A.C.B. Bellerby
- 1910: G.F.B. Morris
- Lent 1911 – Easter 1912: H.W.K. Mowll
- 1912–13: G.B. Sellwood
- 1913–14: W.R.D. Robertson
- 1914–15: J.W.McK. Nicholl
- 1915–16: E.W. Hare
- 1916–17: G.R. Lindsay
- 1918–19: R.P. Dick
- 1919–20: B.G. Buxton
- Easter 1920: M.H. Webb-Peploe
- Michaelmas 1920: C.A. Martin
- Lent 1921 – Easter 1921: T.S. Goodwin
- 1921–22: C.H.M. Foster
- 1922–23: C.G. Webb-Peploe
- 1923–24: F.H. Pickering
- 1924–25: C.J.B. Harrison
- Michaelmas 1925: H.W. Boake
- Lent 1926 – Easter 1927: H.R. Gough
- 1927–28: K.H. Hooker
- 1928–29: N.A.L. Miller
- 1929–30: H.A.Evan Hopkins
- 1930–31: J.N.D. Anderson
- 1931–32: R.G. Allison
- 1932–33: R.J. Cobb
- 1933–34: C.G. Scorer
- 1934–35: H.T. Hughes
- 1935–36: B.C. Gough
- 1936–37: R.J. Knight
- 1937–38: R.J.B. Eddison
- 1938–39: D.C. Argyle
- 1939–40: F.D. Kidner
- 1940–41: R.F. Hettlinger
- Michaelmas 1941 – Michaelmas 1942: O.R. Barclay
- Lent 1943 – Easter 1943: J.D. Davis
- 1943–44: G.K. Barker
- 1944–45: J.H.F. Batstone
- 1945–46: R.S. Dell
- Michaelmas 1946: J.C. Pollock
- Lent 1947 – Easter 1947: J.A. Boyes
- Michaelmas 1947 – Lent 1948: G.F. Grobecker

From this point the usual tenure was from the Easter term of one year to the Lent term of the next

- 1948–49: D.J. Drew
- 1949–50: J.F. Sertin
- 1950–51: J.T.C.B. Collins
- 1951–52: M.C. Griffiths
- 1952–54: Names lost
- 1954–55: A.A.W. Kimpton
- 1955–58: Names lost
- 1958–59: J. Morris
- 1959–63: Names lost
- 1963–64: S. Baldock
- 1964–69: Names lost
- 1969–70: M. Cuthbertson
- 1970–71: M. Elston
- 1971–72: D. Evans
- 1972–73: D. Hunt
- 1973–74: R. Capper
- 1974-75: P. Doyle
- 1975–76: J. Glauert
- 1976–77: J. Samuel
- 1977–78: J. Partington
- 1978–79: P. Weston
- 1979–80: J. Barclay
- 1980–81: J. Stuart
- 1981–82: T. Green
- 1982–83: T. Pickett
- 1983–84: C. Naylor
- 1984–85: Tim Law
- 1985–86: I. McIntosh
- 1986–87: V.E. Roberts
- 1987–88: A. Horn
- 1988–89: K. Green
- 1989–90: T. Thomas
- 1990–91: T. Cole
- 1991–92: J. Moody
- 1992–93: G. Treece
- 1993–94: U. Mayr-Harting
- 1994–95: J. Rea
- 1995–96: D. Horrocks
- 1996–97: J. Sidders
- 1997–98: D. Gobbett
- 1998–99: S. Wearn
- 1999–2000: J. White
- 2000–01: R. Mann
- 2001–02: R. Evans
- 2002–03: K. Butler
- 2003–04: J. Percival
- 2004–05: G. Shearer
- 2005–06: D. Pfeiffer
- 2006–07: B. Monteiro
- 2007–08: C. Butler
- 2008–09: J. Young
- 2009–10: M. Pilkington
- 2010–11: P. Hammersley
- 2011–12: C. Nickerson
- 2012–13: M. Lewis
- 2013–14: A. Greaves
- 2014–15: J. Thompson
- 2015–16: G. Sterlini
- 2016–17: D. Palmer
- 2017–18: J. Payne
- 2018–19: T. Colpus
- 2019–20: T. Saer
- 2020–21: A. Webb
- 2021–22: K. Heasman
- 2022–23: P. McCartney
- 2023–24: D. Read
- 2024–25: T. France
- 2025-26: D. King

Sources in the Cambridge University Library

== Affiliation ==
- UCCF (Universities and Colleges Christian Fellowship)
- IFES (International Fellowship of Evangelical Students)

== See also ==
- Cambridge Seven
- Oxford Inter-Collegiate Christian Union

== Bibliography ==
- Old Paths in Perilous Times: an account of the Cambridge Inter-Collegiate Christian Union, Basil F. C. Atkinson : London, Inter-Varsity booklet, 1932.
- A Cambridge Movement, J. C. Pollock: London, John Murray, 1953.
- Whatever Happened to the Jesus Lane Lot?, Oliver R. Barclay : Leicester, Inter-Varsity Press, 1977, ISBN 0-85110-396-0.
- From Cambridge to the World: 125 years of student witness / Oliver R. Barclay and Robert M. Horn : Leicester, Inter-Varsity Press, 2002, ISBN 0-85111-499-7.
- 'The Rise of the Cambridge Inter-Collegiate Christian Union, 1910–1971', David Goodhew, in Journal of Ecclesiastical History Vol.LIV no.1, pp. 62–88.
- Cambridge Students and Christianity Worldwide: Insights from the 1960s, Ian M. Randall, Cambridge, UK: Cambridge Centre for Christianity Worldwide, 2019.
