= Tertiary Students Christian Fellowship =

New Zealand evangelical Christian student movement

Tertiary Students Christian Fellowship is an evangelical Christian student movement with affiliate groups on university campuses in New Zealand. It is a founding member of the International Fellowship of Evangelical Students. With a firm commitment to evangelism and mission, the four principles which guide the TSCF ethos are undivided life, deep thought, global reach and true witness. TSCF partners with approximately 2000 supporters, 1000 students and 27 staff members.

== History ==
=== Student Christian Movement ===
From 1895 World Student Christian Federation General Secretary John Mott travelled the world to inspire and establish the formation of university groups with a vision of ‘The evangelisation of the world in this generation’. One of the groups established was the Australasian Student Christian Union (ASCU), which, was formed at a conference held at Ormond College, Melbourne University, on 6 June 1896. The ASCU covered both Australia and New Zealand until a New Zealand Student Christian Movement was established in 1921, and had branches in numerous universities and colleges throughout the country.

=== Fundamentalist–Modernist Controversy ===
The Student Christian Movement had evangelical roots, in the work and examples of early pioneers such as Dwight L. Moody, Hudson Taylor, Sholto Douglas, Handley Moule, the “Cambridge Seven”, Robert Wilder, and its close connection with the Keswick Convention. However, as the Fundamentalist–Modernist Controversy began to gain profile in the late 1890s and early 1900s tensions began to arise. English General Secretary Tissington Tatlow was sympathetic to the ideal of an inclusive student movement, and this put him and the movement increasingly at odds with evangelical members, particularly at the Cambridge Inter-Collegiate Christian Union (CICCU). In 1909 CICCU withdrew from the movement, and was subsequently followed by a number of other university groups.

These same tensions were manifest in the New Zealand movement, with a number of members concerned by the advancement of the modernist cause. One such member was William H. Pettit (1885-1985). Pettit came into contact with the movement while attending Nelson College, and subsequently the University of Otago from 1904 to 1908. The preaching of Mott inspired him and his wife to serve as medical missionaries to Bangladesh for five years. Upon returning he continued his involvement with SCM, but in 1927 established a separate Bible study group which became known as the Auckland College Student Bible League. New Zealand historian Peter Lineham suggests links between Pettit's ‘Bible League’ and the ‘League of Students’ formed by American fundamentalist leader John Gresham Machen.

=== Inter-Varsity Fellowship ===
During the 1920s CICCU came under the leadership of Howard Mowll, who developed the network of the union with of other evangelical student groups, and formalized this as the Inter-Varsity Fellowship (IVF) in 1928. WEC General Secretary Norman Grubb challenged Mowll and his team to help other evangelical student groups across the globe, with the aim of establishing an evangelical witness in every university. Howard Guinness was sent out for this task, visiting Australia in 1929 and 1930. His second visit resulted in the establishment of evangelical unions in Melbourne, Brisbane and Hobart.

At the invitation of Pettit, Guinness arrived in New Zealand on 22 September 1930. He visited schools and all four University centres (Auckland, Wellington, Christchurch and Dunedin), and his visit resulted in the formation of the Crusader Union of New Zealand. Pettit was the founding chairman of this union, and Auckland Baptist Tabernacle minister Joseph Kemp was vice-president. The crusader movement set in motion a burgeoning evangelical student ministry in New Zealand, and created the momentum that in 1936 resulted in the formation of the Inter-Varsity Fellowship of Evangelical Unions (NZ).

=== The Fellowship ===
In 1947 IVF New Zealand joined with ten other national movements to form the International Fellowship of Evangelical Students. In 1965 Overseas Christian Fellowship (OCF) began at the University of Otago, and the OCF movement quickly spread to the other New Zealand campuses. IVF changed its name to Tertiary Students Christian Fellowship in 1973.

== See Also ==
International sister organisations

- Australian Fellowship of Evangelical Students
- InterVarsity Christian Fellowship (USA)
- Inter-Varsity Christian Fellowship of Canada
- Universities and Colleges Christian Fellowship (United Kingdom)
