= IVCF =

IVCF may stand for:

- InterVarsity Christian Fellowship
- Inter-Varsity Christian Fellowship of Canada
- InterVarsity Choral Festival (Canada)
- Sydney Intervarsity Choral Festival, (also SIV)
