= Hian =

Hian may refer to:

== People ==
- Chua Wee Hian (born 1939), Singaporean evangelical
- Eng Hian (born 1977)
- Liem Koen Hian (ca 1896-1952), Indonesian journalist and politician
- Sim Kui Hian (born 1965), Malaysian cardiologist
- Tan Swie Hian, Singaporean multidisciplinary artist
- Tay Peng Hian, Singaporean philatelist
- Teng Yu-hsien (1906–1944), Taiwanese Hakka musician

== Places ==
- Hian, Konarak, Iran
- Hian (Swedish river)
- Hian (Guinean river)
