= Donald McLeod =

Donald McLeod (or Don / MacLeod, or Mcleod) may refer to:

== Politicians ==
- Donald Friell McLeod (1810–1872), British Raj Lieutenant Governor of Punjab
- Donald McLeod (Victorian state politician) (1837–1923), member of the Victorian Legislative Assembly
- Donald Buchanan McLeod (1865–1943), political figure in Nova Scotia, Canada
- Donald McLeod (Minnesota politician) (1912–2009), American farmer, businessman, and politician
- Don McLeod (politician) (1892–1963), Australian politician
- Donald Macleod (politician) (1878–1957), politician from Alberta, Canada
- Donald Norman McLeod (1848–1914), Australian pastoralist and politician
- Donald R. MacLeod (1902–1976), Canadian politician in the Nova Scotia House of Assembly
- "Big" Donnie MacLeod (1928–2003), Canadian politician

== Sportsmen ==
- Don McLeod (1946–2015), Canadian ice hockey goaltender
- Don Macleod (footballer) (1917–1999), Scottish footballer (Motherwell FC)
- Donald McLeod (footballer) (1882–1917), Scottish footballer (Celtic FC, Middlesbrough FC, national team)
- Donald MacLeod (cross-country skier) (born 1938), Canadian former cross-country skier
- Donald MacLeod (New Zealand cricketer) (1932-2008), New Zealand cricketer
- Donald McLeod (Trinidadian cricketer) (born 1963), Trinidadian cricketer
- Don MacLeod (businessman) (born 1947), South African cricketer and businessman
- Donnie McLeod (motorcyclist), participant in events such as the 1988 French motorcycle Grand Prix

== Military ==
- Donald McLeod (Loyalist), British army officer in Battle of Moore's Creek Bridge
- Donald McLeod (Upper Canada Rebellion) (1779–1879), figure in the Upper Canada Rebellion
- Donald Kenneth McLeod (1885–1958), officer in the British Army

== Others ==
- A. Donald Macleod (born 1938), church historian
- Don McLeod (Aboriginal rights activist), Western Australian Aboriginal rights activist, see Pilbara#20th century
- Donald Macleod (theologian) (1940–2023), Scottish theologian
- Donald MacLeod (piper) (1917–1982), Scottish pipe major
- Donny MacLeod (1932–1984), Scottish TV presenter
- Donald Macleod (surgeon), (born 1941), Scottish surgeon
- Donald Macleod (radio presenter), BBC Radio 3 presenter, 1982-present; most notably for the programme Composer of the Week
- Donald Macleod (physicist) (1887–1972), New Zealand molecular physicist
