= Christian unions (student groups) =

Evangelical Christian student groups

Christian unions (CUs) are evangelical Christian student groups. They exist in many countries and are often affiliated with either the International Fellowship of Evangelical Students (through a national body) or the Campus Crusade for Christ. Many Christian unions are one of the societies affiliated to their universities' students' union. As a broader term, Christian union may refer to any Christian student society, such as SCM and Fusion groups.

== In the United Kingdom ==
Since their split from the Student Christian Movement in the early twentieth century, most Christian Unions in the United Kingdom are affiliated to the Universities and Colleges Christian Fellowship (UCCF). Some UK Christian Unions have had difficult relationships with the students' union due to their policy of allowing leaders to choose their successors in order, they argue, to ensure a Christian leadership (students' unions often require democratic processes be followed), opinions on issues such as homosexuality and the role of women, and the requirement that leaders affirm a fixed conservative evangelical Doctrinal Basis. Many, but not all, CUs require all members to sign this Doctrinal Basis. The latter includes doctrinal statements that go beyond the historic ecumenical creeds, e.g. recognising the Bible as the sole authority, and belief in penal substitution. A considerable number of Christian students have problems affirming these points, and feel excluded from Christian Unions. This has led to calls for local Christian Unions to change their name to something more specific, e.g. Evangelical Christian Union.

Christian Unions are active in evangelism to fellow-students. As well as hosting traditional talks and debates, they may hold unconventional events such as "Text a Toastie". These particular events involve providing a number to students, to which they text a question about God, the bible, or Christianity more generally, and in response two members of the Christian Union deliver a toastie to them and answer their question. While considered unusual by some, this has proven an effective way of communicating with other students for many CUs.

== See also ==
- International Fellowship of Evangelical Students (international organisation)
- Campus Crusade for Christ (similar international organisation, principally American)
- Universities and Colleges Christian Fellowship (UCCF, UK national organisation)
- Cambridge Inter-Collegiate Christian Union (CICCU)
- Oxford Inter-Collegiate Christian Union (OICCU)

Other UK national organisations

- Student Christian Movement (SCM, established 1889)
