= David Howard Adeney =

British missionary (1911–1994)

- Born: 3 November 1911; Bedford, England
- Died: 11 May 1994 (aged 82); Berkeley, California
- Education: Queens' College, Cambridge
- Occupation: Missionary
- Employer(s): China Inland Mission; InterVarsity Fellowship; International Fellowship of Evangelical Students

David Howard Adeney (3 November 1911 – 11 May 1994) was a British Protestant Christian missionary and university evangelist in Hunan, China and East Asia. He served with the China Inland Mission (CIM), InterVarsity Fellowship, and International Fellowship of Evangelical Students (IFES). In 1968 he founded the Discipleship Training Centre (DTC) in Singapore.

== Life and Ministry ==
Born into a missionary family in Bedford, England on 3 November 1911, Adeney decided to become a missionary to China, following the path of his parents who had worked in Romania with the London Jews' Society. He was educated at Monkton Combe School, Somerset, UK, and completed an MA in theology and history at Queens' College, Cambridge, UK in 1933. Before moving to China in 1934, he spent a year at the CIM training school in London.

Between 1934 and 1914, he was involved in church planting in rural villages in central China. and left for the United States due to the attack on Pearl Harbor. During his stay in the U.S., he worked in InterVarsity for a year, before moving back in China and being appointed as the associate general secretary of China InterVarsity Christian Fellowship.

In 1956, Adeney was appointed the associate general secretary for the Far East of IFES, whose office was located in Hong Kong. He led the student ministry until 1968 when the Cultural Revolution started.

He founded DTC in Singapore, an institution first initiated by the CIM, to train university graduates in theology.

He had various teaching experiences in theological institutes, including the China Graduate School of Theology and New College Berkeley, California.

He died on 11 May 1994 in Berkeley, California.

== Family ==
He married with CIM missionary Ruth Temple in 1938. Both of them moved to Henan for missionary after marriage.

== Archival Collections ==
Adeney's papers are kept at the Billy Graham Center Archives at Wheaton College.

== Works ==
=== Primary Sources ===
- David H. Adeney, The Unchanging Commission (1955)
- David H. Adeney, Before Missionary Service (1967)
- David H. Adeney, China: Christian Students Face the Revolution (1973)
- David H. Adeney, China, the Church's Long March (1985)

=== Secondary Sources ===
- Carolyn Armitage, Reaching for the Goal: The Life Story of David Adeney (1993)

== See also ==
- Historical Bibliography of the China Inland Mission
- OMF International
