= Oxford Inter-Collegiate Christian Union =

Christian union

The Oxford Inter-Collegiate Christian Union, usually known as OICCU (/ˈɔɪkjuː/ OY-kew), is the world's second oldest university Christian Union and is the University of Oxford's most prominent student Christian organisation. It was formed in 1879.

Due to the strength of the Oxford Movement and later the Oxford Groups (alternative Christian movements), evangelical Christians in Oxford have generally faced a more pluriform environment than in Cambridge, and OICCU has tended to follow the general lead of its Cambridge counterpart, the Cambridge Inter-Collegiate Christian Union (CICCU).

OICCU admits postgraduate students as well as undergraduates, although postgraduates are eligible only for associate membership, and their needs may be better served by the Oxford Graduate Christian Forum.

== Aims and purpose ==
The OICCU vision is: Giving every student in Oxford University the chance to hear and respond to the Gospel of Jesus Christ

The three aims of OICCU are:

- Presenting the claims of Jesus Christ to the University
- Uniting in fellowship those who desire to witness for Christ, and to deepen their spiritual life
- Promoting involvement in God's work worldwide

=== Relationship to the local church ===
- The local church is a biblical principle which OICCU does not try to replace in the Christian's life: OICCU encourages all its members to also be part of a local church and to contribute to that family of believers.
- OICCU has the opportunity as a student run organisation to put on events uniquely geared to what its members think its fellow-students want.
- OICCU also has the opportunity to be prominent in the college communities in a way that churches cannot do.
- OICCU is inter-denominational, so its declaration of belief reflects what its members believe to be central to the gospel, and not secondary issues which Christians differ on.

=== Activities and organisation ===
- Personal Evangelism is key to what OICCU does - its members want to get alongside non-Christians and tell them about Christ.
- College Groups enable OICCU to put on events geared towards evangelising the individual college communities. There is a college Christian Union group in almost every undergraduate college in the University. Text-a-toastie is a popular college outreach event. The collegiate structure also enables students to have fellowship with a small group of believers, which helps in reaching out to the rest of the college. OICCU believes that when non-Christians see the Christian Union's members acting like a family and supporting one another it helps with evangelism.
- Central meetings mean that members of OICCU can be encouraged by seeing that there are many people who also want to witness for Christ in Oxford. OICCU has speakers, music and opportunities to hear about God's work in Oxford and further abroad.
- Monday Morning Prayer: The members of OICCU pray together regularly, recognising their belief that everything they do is useless if God is not at work. Central events are a resource to back up personal evangelism; OICCU has weekly events like 'Friday Lunchtime Talks' and bigger events like the Carol Services.
- Events Week: Since 1940, OICCU has held weeks of evangelistic events including apologetics talks and a summary of the gospel. This now happens annually, with a larger series of evangelistic events organised every three years.
- Residentials: OICCU hosts several annual residentials for its members, in particular the "Freshaway" event, which was first held in September 2016, and aims to help new students ("freshers") make Christian friends in the university, alongside seminars and talks to train and equip Christians for evangelism.
- The Search is an event which aims to provide opportunities for open discussion between Christians and non-Christians on a variety of topics, and to allow Christians to share their beliefs with their friends. This event usually takes place in a local Oxford café.

== Beliefs and affiliation ==
OICCU adopts the doctrinal basis of UCCF (Universities and Colleges Christian Fellowship), an evangelical Christian organisation with which OICCU is affiliated. The doctrinal basis contains what evangelicals perceive as the biblical foundations of Christianity. UCCF is in turn affiliated with the International Fellowship of Evangelical Students (IFES).

== History ==
=== Foundation ===
OICCU was modelled after the Cambridge Inter-Collegiate Christian Union (CICCU), founded two years earlier, but later incorporated a Daily Prayer Meeting established in Brasenose College in 1867. Like Wycliffe Hall (also 1877), it could be seen as a response to the University's abandonment of its previous officially Protestant position. The initial members included Francis Chavasse, subsequently Bishop of Liverpool and founder of St Peter's College.

=== Relations with the SCM ===
OICCU was a founder member of the Student Christian Movement and followed its lead in liberalizing its doctrine. In 1914 OICCU, along with the rest of the University, suspended its activities.

After World War I, the Oxford SCM was reestablished under that name, but those who held OICCU's original doctrinal position established a separate Oxford University Bible Union. In 1925 the two agreed to merge, and the OUBU became the Devotional Union of the Student Christian Movement in Oxford. However, the merger was not successful and in Michaelmas 1927, the Devotional Union committee voted to secede. The SCM gave them permission to use the old (1879) name and so OICCU was born anew, adopting the Doctrinal Basis of the new Inter-Varsity Fellowship of Evangelical Unions (now UCCF) in 1928.

During much of this period, OICCU used some of the buildings later incorporated into St Peter's College. However, after 1933 it had the use of the Northgate Hall (just opposite the Oxford Union on St Michael's Street).

=== The Oxford Groups ===
During the 1920s and 1930s, an American preacher named Frank N. D. Buchman drew a considerable following at Oxford. He emphasized the use of small groups (with Buchman-appointed leaders) where sins were publicly confessed and repented of. The movement taught that the Holy Spirit was to directly guide Christians. These small groups became known as Oxford Groups and later Moral Re-Armament. The emphasis on small groups and personal belief was inherited by Alcoholics Anonymous.

Buchman was appealing directly to the OICCU constituency, and Julian Thornton-Duesbury (one of OICCU's supervising university teachers) became a noted Buchmanite. However, OICCU's student leadership distanced themselves from Buchman.

=== 1940s: Problems and Packer ===
The International Fellowship of Evangelical Students, the worldwide body to which OICCU belongs, was planned at a conference in Oxford in the late 1930s.

World War II forced those plans to be delayed. The greatly reduced number of students in Oxford obviously interfered with OICCU itself; one medical student had to serve as President for much more than the customary one year of office. However, the Union maintained daily prayer meetings (in termtime) throughout the War. Afterwards, a Standing Committee of prominent past members was established to ensure the Union's long-term continuity in such circumstances and in 1948 they became trustees of the Northgate Hall. The Standing Committee also has some reserve powers regarding the Doctrinal Basis, although they have never been used.

More positively, the prominent evangelical theologian J. I. Packer was converted to evangelical Christianity at an OICCU meeting in the 1940s, during his first week at the university. While a student member he was not regarded as doctrinally sound enough to join the Executive Committee. However, he was appointed Librarian, taking a particular interest in OICCU's selection of out-of-print Puritan books. In the following decade Packer, along with Martyn Lloyd-Jones, led a revival of Puritan studies amongst British pastors. He returned to Oxford in 2004 as the guest of honour at the 125th Anniversary celebrations.

=== Post-war era ===
The 1950s saw OICCU at perhaps its greatest numerical strength, while the SCM was seen to have moved towards Marxism. One leading figure at this time was Michael Green (President in 1952), who has been a leading evangelical in the Church of England and then the Anglican Communion since the 1960s. Green has taken a particular interest in promoting the Charismatic Movement, including within OICCU.

In a slightly later generation, Tom Wright was the OICCU President (1970–71) and published his first book together with other members of his year's Executive Committee. The book was a plea for a conservative Calvinist doctrinal position, a position he has since modified.

A feature of the post-war years has been the custom of triennial missions which attempt to explain the gospel to every undergraduate. These missions can trace their history back to the visit of Dwight Moody and Ira D. Sankey in 1882, but the current model began with a 1940 mission led by Lloyd-Jones. Subsequent main speakers have included Michael Green, Dick Lucas (long-time rector of St Helen's Bishopsgate), John Stott; one of Stott's series of talks was subsequently published as Basic Christianity, and Tim Keller.

OICCU membership has diminished since the middle part of the century, and now usually stands in the low hundreds — however formal membership is not needed to participate, and as of March 2006 OICCU's group membership on Facebook exceeded its official membership. The lease on the Northgate Hall was given up in the 1980s, and the Union has returned to the peripatetic existence of its earliest years, meeting in various church and public buildings around the city. Its archives are now held in the Bodleian Library and it has the use of a small store room at St Ebbe's church and New Road Baptist Church.

== OICCU President ==
- 1879: George King
- 1881: Frank Webster
- 1882: William Talbot Rice
- 1885: Vernon Bartlet
- 1891: Thomas Ketchlee
- 1892: Tom Alvarez
- 1893: Edmund Elwin
- 1894: Temple Gairdner
- 1895: Willie Holland
- 1897: Fergus McNeile
- 1898: Robert Drury
- 1905: Jack Woodhouse
- 1907: Geoffrey Lunt
- 1909: Nathaniel Micklem
- 1919: Willoughby Habershon
- 1920: Noel Palmer
- 1921: Willoughby Habershon
- 1922: Talbot Mohan
- 1925: Verrier Elwin
- 1926: Gordon Aldis
- 1935: David Bentley-Taylor
- 1938: Herbert Pope
- 1943: David Mullins
- 1947: Donald Wiseman
- 1951: Michael Farrer
- 1952: Michael Green
- 1953 Martin Peppiatt
- 1955: Kenneth Habershon
- 1956: J. D. Morris
- 1957: Patrick Harris
- 1958: H. W. J. Harland
- 1959: David R. Catchpole
- 1960: B. T. Lloyd
- 1961: John G. Wesson
- 1962: G. Graham Dow
- 1963: A. M. G. Dalzell
- 1964: Ray A. E. Shilling
- 1965: R. D. Toley
- 1966: John Clarke
- 1967: Denis Alexander
- 1968: Chris M. N. Sugden
- 1969: Richard Kennedy
- 1970: N. T. Wright
- 1971: Duncan Munro
- 1972: Christopher Foster
- 1973: Morey Thomas
- 1974: Keith Sinclair
- 1975: Lindsay Brown
- 1976: Tony Walker
- 1977: Shaun Atkins
- 1978: Iain Broomfield
- 1979: Stephen Wright
- 1980: Tim Saunders
- 1981: Richard Dain
- 1982: David Field
- 1983: Hugh Skiel
- 1984: David Gray
- 1985: Mark May
- 1986: Rick Simpson
- 1987: Andy Buckler
- 1988: Simon Cansdale
- 1989: Steve Divall
- 1990: Richard Frank
- 1991: Nat Schluter
- 1994: Stuart Cashman
- 1995: James Ewins
- 1996: Stephen Jones
- 1997: Ed Reid
- 1998: David Scoffield
- 1999: Paul Murray
- 1999: Martin Thornley
- 2000: Tom Patrick
- 2001: Joshua Hordern
- 2002: Ed Boddam-Whetham
- 2003: David 'Benny' Goodman
- 2004: John Aldis
- 2005: Edward Clark
- 2006: Gregory Tarr
- 2007: Daniel Tredget
- 2008: David Meryon
- 2009: Graham Thornton
- 2010: Joel Harland
- 2011: Robbie Strachan
- 2012: Tim Bateman
- 2013: Josh Peppiatt
- 2014: Luke Cornelius
- 2015: Pete Downing
- 2016: Clem Faux
- 2017: Sam Hodson
- 2018: Abigail Marthinet-Payne
- 2019: Emily Lobb
- 2020: Stephen Lidbetter
- 2021: Thomas Farlow
- 2022: N. Ford
- 2023: Mary Chen
- 2024: Charis Patterson
- 2025: Benjamin Mathole
- 2026: Ester Hattingh

== See also ==
- Holy Club
- Oxford University Newman Society

== Bibliography ==
- Born Anew John S. Reynolds : Oxford, OICCU Centenary & Executive Committees, 1979.
- Meeting Jesus at University: Rites of Passage and Student Evangelicals Edward Dutton: 2008. Ashgate.
- Christ and the Colleges F. Donald Coggan : London, Inter-Varsity Fellowship, 1934.
- The Evangelicals at Oxford, 1735-1871 : a record of an unchronicled movement, with the record extended to 1905, and an essay on Oxford evangelical theology John S. Reynolds with J. I. Packer : Abingdon, Marcham Manor Press, 1975.
- The Evangelicals at Oxford, 1735-1871 : a record of an unchronicled movement John S. Reynolds : Oxford, Basil Blackwell, 1953.
- From Cambridge to the world: 125 years of student witness / Oliver R. Barclay and Robert M. Horn : Leicester, Inter-Varsity Press, 2002, ISBN 0-85111-499-7.
