= ICFB =

ICFB, icfb or ICF/B may refer to:

- International Christian Fellowship of Budapest, part of the International Fellowship of Evangelical Students
- icfb, a baseline tag in OpenType feature files
- "Integrated Circuit Front to Back", a design framework from Cadence Design Systems
- Internally circulating fluidized bed, a kind of fluidized bed
