= Australian Fellowship of Evangelical Students =

Australian student religious movement

- Formation: 1936
- Type: Christian evangelical student association
- Affiliations: International Fellowship of Evangelical Students
- Website: afes.org.au

The Australian Fellowship of Evangelical Students (AFES) is an evangelical Christian student movement with affiliate groups on university campuses in Australia. It is a member of the International Fellowship of Evangelical Students.

== History ==
The young English evangelist, Howard Guinness, toured Australia in 1930 to encourage university students in evangelism. He helped form campus student groups starting in Sydney, then Melbourne, Brisbane and Hobart, including Sydney University Evangelical Union (SUEU) and Melbourne University Christian Union, which celebrated their 75th anniversaries in 2005. Guinness returned in 1933-1934 and founded groups in Perth and Adelaide.

These groups, led by the SUEU and the MUCU, joined together to form a network in 1936 as the Australian Intervarsity Fellowship or IVF, which later changed its name to the AFES in 1973. It had over 2000 members by 1959 and today has groups in over 50 campuses across the country in every state and territory, and employs over 100 staffworkers who look after the students on their various campuses.

In 2005, to celebrate the 75th anniversary of the first student groups in Australia, AFES ran a "Year of Tertiary Evangelism" involving coordinated events on university campuses throughout the country and the printing of 40000 copies of Mark's Gospel to be freely distributed throughout the year. The theme of the year was "For Christ's Sake", a phrase normally used in swearing, though used here to promote the Christian message itself. Besides the events on specific university campuses, the AFES ran various evangelistic rallies with many Christian groups from different universities attending.

Muriel Porter suggests that AFES is the "predominant student Christian organization across Australian universities," since the demise of the Student Christian Movement and the decline of diocesan-funded university chaplaincies.

== Activities ==
AFES groups run a variety of activities, such as regular public Bible talks, smaller Bible studies, prayer groups, mid-year conferences and evangelistic outreach events. These activities are organised and run by both staff and students.

Each year in December, the AFES runs a National Training Event (NTE). This consists of a four- to five-day training conference, followed by several days of mission. The most recent NTE conference was hosted at Exhibition Park in Canberra (EPIC), and was attended by up to 1400 students from around Australia. The mission aspect of the NTE takes place in conjunction with churches around Australia.

As an Australian movement, AFES is noted for using Biblical theology in the way its students approach the Bible. In groups, students have been encouraged to let the Bible "speak for itself, whether or not we knew what to do with it in the end." This has been compared to approaches encouraged by the Swiss theologian Karl Barth who encouraged a kind of re-discovery of Scriptures, what he called the "strange new world of the Bible."

== Staff ==
The national director of AFES is Richard Chin. He was preceded by Kerry Nagel. On August 11, 2025, the Board announced Peter Sorrenson as Richard's successor, commencing in 2026.

Staff are employed through AFES for the particular university campuses. Each staff member must raise his or her own financial support, which is sent to AFES by supporters and paid out to staff as a salary. (Many supporters of AFES staff are former AFES students who are now in paid employment.)

Staff usually are Staffworkers and Trainees, who usually work for a two-year "traineeship". After completing the traineeship, they may move to theological education and a more senior position.

== See also ==
- Christian Union
- International Fellowship of Evangelical Students
- International student ministry
- Universities and Colleges Christian Fellowship (United Kingdom)
- Tertiary Students Christian Fellowship (New Zealand)
- Ichthys
- Campus Bible Study
