= Tom Lin =

Tom Lin may refer to:

- Tom Lin (evangelical) (born 1973), American evangelical
- Tom Lin (writer) (born 1996), American novelist
- Tom Lin Shu-yu (born 1976), Taiwanese filmmaker
