= Evangelical Union =

Evangelical Union may refer to:

- Evangelical Union (Scotland), a religious phenomenon in Scotland
- Protestant Union, a coalition of Protestant German states in the 17th century
- A union between Lutheran and Reformed Churches, e.g. Prussian Union
- A campus Christian group affiliated with Campus Crusade for Christ
- The Sydney University Evangelical Union, a University Christian group with the University of Sydney
