= Joseph Kemp (minister) =

New Zealand minister (1872–1933)

Joseph William Kemp (16 December 1872 – 4 September 1933) was a Baptist minister and preacher, a revivalist, and a leader of the Christian fundamentalist movement in New Zealand.

== Early life ==
Kemp was born in Kingston upon Hull, on 16 December 1872, the second of six children of Joseph Kemp and Mary Hopkin. His father, a policeman, drowned while on duty, and his mother died less than two years later when he was only nine.

== UK and US ==
Influenced by the Keswick movement, Kemp worked as a bible class teacher in his early years, and studied at the Glasgow Bible Training Institute from 1893 to 1895. He pastored churches in Kelso (1897–1898), Hawick (1898–1902), and Charlotte Chapel, Edinburgh (1902–1915), and then pastored Calvary Baptist Church (1915–1917) and Metropolitan Baptist Tabernacle (1917–1919) in New York City.

== New Zealand ==
In August 1920, Kemp was appointed to the Auckland Baptist Tabernacle. He was known as the prime spokesperson for American fundamentalism in New Zealand. He founded the New Zealand Bible Training Institute in 1922. This college went on to become the leading educational institutional for evangelicals in New Zealand, a position it holds to this day as Laidlaw College. He founded the Reaper in March 1923, a monthly journal devoted to fundamentalist and revivalist theology, and in 1924 helped to found the Ngāruawāhia convention.

After seeing the detrimental effect of fundamentalism on interdenominational work during a visit to the United States in 1926, Kemp softened his stance somewhat, partly due to the influence of Baptist College of New Zealand principal J. J. North. He was a leading influence on a number of leading New Zealand evangelicals, including William H. Pettit and E. M. Blaiklock. His grandson Ian served as a lecturer, vice principal and acting Principal at the Auckland campus of Bible College of New Zealand, and his great-grandson Hugh has served as lecturer and Dean at the Manawatu Regional centre of Bible College of New Zealand in Palmerston North.

Kemp was a member of the Baptist College committee (1923–1933), president of the Baptist Union of New Zealand (1929), and vice president of the Crusader Union of New Zealand (1931–1933). He died on 4 September 1933, in Auckland.
