= Basil Atkinson =

Under-librarian of University of Cambridge

Basil Ferris Campbell Atkinson (1895–1971) was the under-librarian of the University of Cambridge and Keeper of Manuscripts from 1925 to 1960, and a writer on theology. He was born in Tonbridge, Kent and attended Tonbridge School before, in 1919, entering Magdalene College, Cambridge, where he read for a Classics degree and took a double first. He went on to obtain a Ph.D. in 1926. He was actively involved with the Cambridge Inter-Collegiate Christian Union for many years and in the formation of the Inter Varsity Fellowship (now the Universities and Colleges Christian Fellowship), and also as a writer of academic literature, and Christian books and Bible commentaries. He remained in Cambridge until his death.

== Activities in the Cambridge Inter-Collegiate Christian Union ==
Atkinson had considered work on the mission field but concluded that he should stay in Cambridge where he became a valued adviser of Christian Union, where for some years in the 1930s, he was the only member of the university staff who gave the Union his full support and his house was used for garden parties on Sunday afternoons.

== Writings ==
=== Linguistics ===
Ancient Ilyrian (1931); The Greek Language (1932); A Theology of Prepositions as an application of linguistics to Theology 1945.

=== Biblical studies and theological writings ===
Atkinson's principal theological works include Is the Bible True? (1934); Valiant in Fight (1937), an overview of Church history from an evangelical perspective, the title being taken from Hebrews 11:34).

Atkinson's biblical studies include The War with Satan (1940), an historicist interpretation of The Book of Revelation in which he adopts the Thomas Brightman view of the seven churches, the synchronicity principle of Joseph Mede, and several of the ideas of Isaac Newton; The Christian's use of The Old Testament (1952); and The Times of the Gentiles (1968), a commentary on the Book of Daniel, intended to complement The War with Satan. Atkinson also wrote a series of commentaries on the books of Genesis to Numbers between 1952 and 1962. He formatted his commentaries with reference to chapter and verse in the left margin, instructed his readers to refer to the appropriate Bible texts as they study.

Atkinson was most notable for his advocacy of soul sleep and conditional immortality. within the Cambridge Inter-Collegiate Christian Union (CICCU) and the Inter Varsity Fellowship in the 1920s where he influenced, among others, John W. Wenham.

His views formed the substance of his final work, published privately, is his Life and Immortality in which he deployed all of his rhetorical skills to promote the doctrine of conditional immortality.

Atkinson was a creationist and was a founding member of the Evolution Protest Movement in 1935.

== Literary style ==
Atkinson was keen to cover a broad scope, especially historical, in his subjects and to avoid specialist terminology. In the foreword to 'The Greek Language", for example, he states it is "a summary history of the whole language from its origins to the present day" and of the difficulty of "the tendency of the linguistic chapters to become too technical and those upon literature too elementary". Nevertheless, as a Latin scholar he is unafraid of giving even whole verbatim quotations from the original sources in that language in his evangelical works intended for wider readership. In the latter works, while he writes in plain language and draws on a wide range of facts, his style often becomes highly rhetorical in criticism of The Roman Catholic Church (particularly the Inquisition) and Liberal Christianity. In many ways he was the pioneer of popular evangelical literature written in a plain style.

== See also ==
- Annihilationism, the belief of some Christians that the unsaved ultimately cease to exist
- Historicism view of apocalyptic prophecy that sees it as synchronous with church history.
- Postmillennialism view that Christ will only visibly come after the millennium.
