= Sydney University Evangelical Union =

Christian group

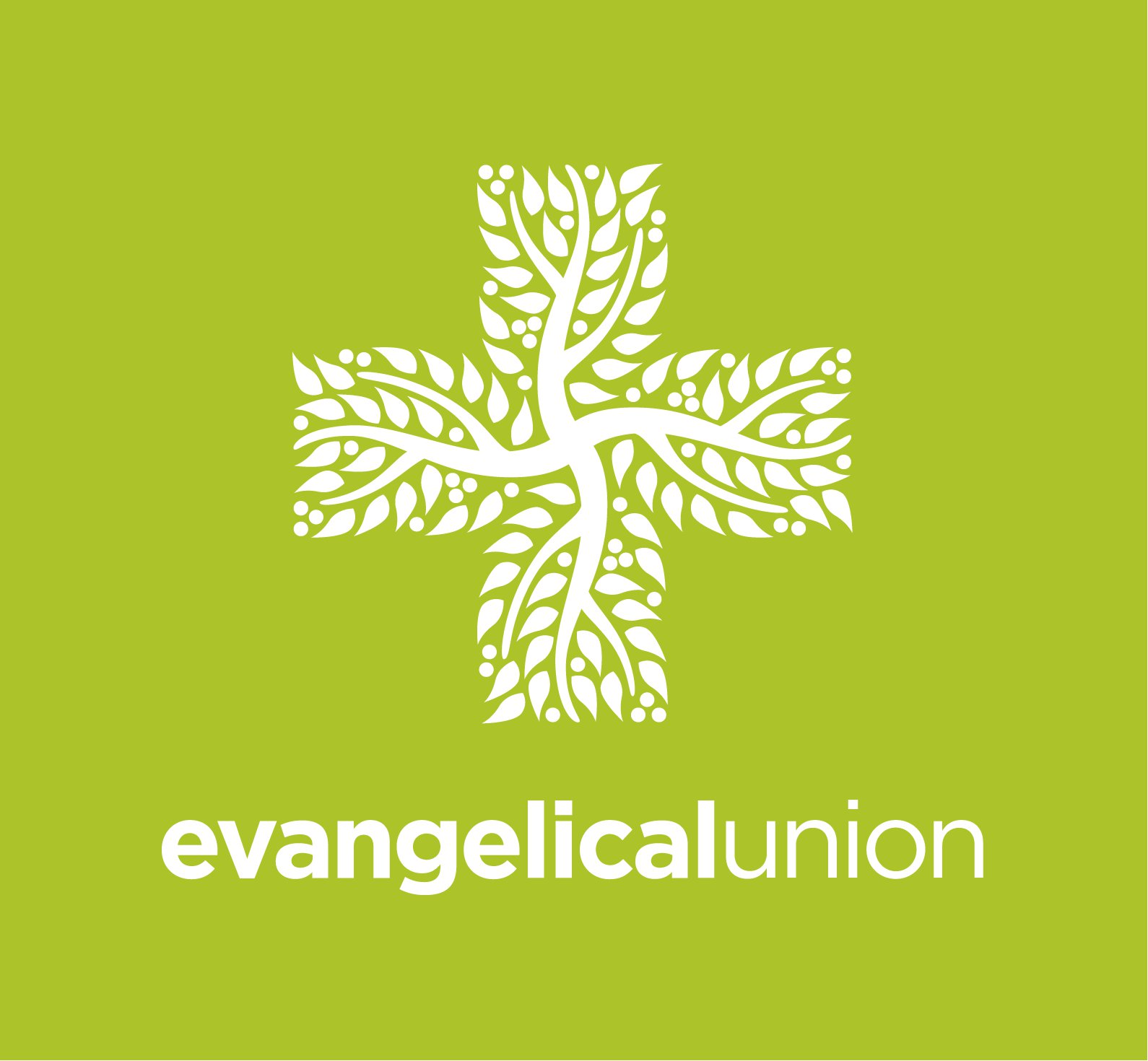

The Sydney University Evangelical Union (abbreviated to SUEU or simply the EU) is a student-led Christian group that has operated at the University of Sydney since 1930. It is affiliated with the Australian Fellowship of Evangelical Students (AFES) and the International Fellowship of Evangelical Students. The EU has throughout its history maintained a relationship with St Barnabas Anglican Church in Broadway and the Sydney Anglican culture in general whilst retaining a non-denominational base. The EU is also quite unique amongst its contemporary AFES affiliates in having a student-staff partnership, in contrast to other groups (such as Campus Bible Study at the University of New South Wales) which has maintained a staff-run model.

== Description ==
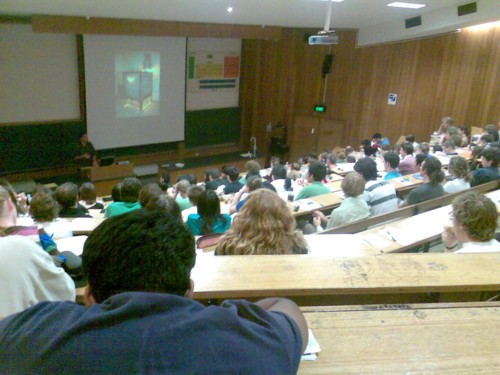
A Public Meeting from 2008

The Sydney University Evangelical Union is a registered student society of the University of Sydney, comprising an estimated 600 Christian students, making it one of the largest registered clubs and societies of the University of Sydney Union (USU). It is led by an elected student executive consisting of a president, male and female vice-presidents, a secretary and treasurer. They are elected annually at the September AGM.

The EU is governed by the General Council, which consists of representatives from the executive, faculty leadership (who in turn lead committees to run ministry within their faculty) and wider EU membership; the latter of which are often appointed by the General Council to lead a specialist team responsible for the organisation of things such as Public Meetings, Annual Conference, IT and Training.

Activities include sermons in Public Meetings, faculty based small group bible studies, prayer meetings, several conferences including Annual Conference and Leadership Summit, along with mission trips. These activities are organized by specialist teams consisting of students and staff, led by a student appointed by the General Council. The EU regularly runs events designed to present students with the Christian Gospel, per the objectives of the EU, and to attract new members; for example, in 2008 the EU hosted a campus-wide festival, with scores of events taking place throughout the university

== Notable people ==
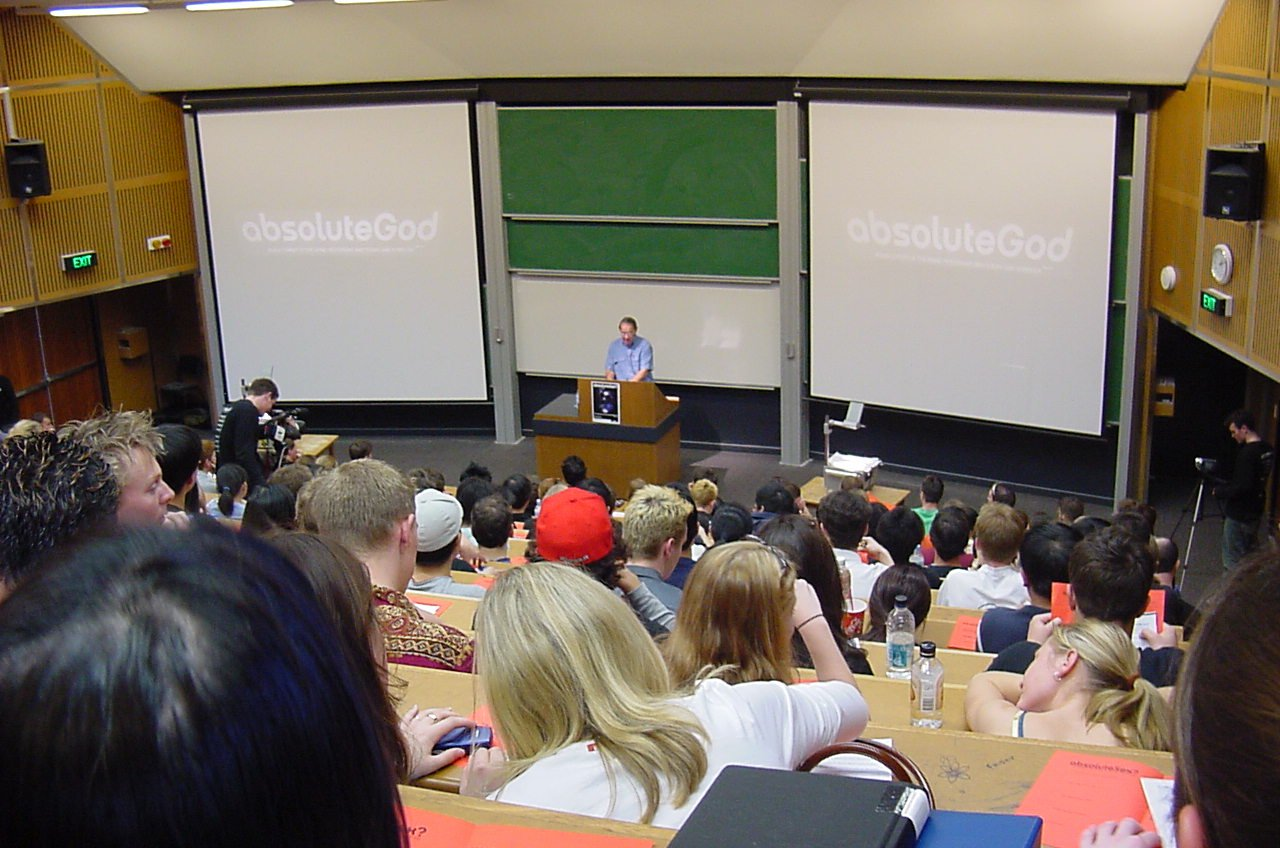
Philip Jensen speaking at an Absolute God event, 2002.

Former members of the EU:

- Paul White
- Sir Marcus Loane
- Catherine Hamlin
- Donald Robinson
- Dudley Foord
- Peter Jensen
- Phillip Jensen
- Barbara Thiering
- Robert Forsyth
- Bruce Baird
- Mike Baird
- Catherine West
- Meredith Lake
- Eddie Woo

== History ==
A history of the EU's first 75 years (1930–2005) was published in 2005. It is written by Meredith Lake, EU Vice-president 2002–03. A further history is also available on the EU website.

In 2002, the Union made a publication to Honi Soit, the University's student newspaper, signed by 22 senior academics, encouraging students to investigate Christianity as part of their on-campus mission, "absoluteGod". This worried some for allegedly damaging the religious and racial tolerance at the university.

In 2016, the EU was threatened with deregistration from the USU on the basis that its faith based membership requirements were considered exclusionary, however after opposition from the EU and other religious societies, the USU agreed to reverse this decision.
