= William H. Pettit =

New Zealand missionary (1885–1985)

William Haddow Pettit MBE (13 April 1885 – 16 December 1985) was a Christian missionary to Bangladesh with the New Zealand Baptist Missionary Society from 1910 to 1915, and a leader of the fundamentalist/evangelical movement in New Zealand in the 1920s and 1930s. He founded the Crusader Union of New Zealand in 1930 after hosting IVF preacher Howard Guinness, and played a leading role in the formation of the Inter-Varsity Fellowship of Evangelical Unions (NZ) (now known as Tertiary Students Christian Fellowship) in 1936. He later joined the Open Brethren.

He contributed a chapter on evolution to the book Heresies Exposed in 1921, which was edited by the British missionary to India, William C. Irvine. His credentials are listed as M.B. and Ch.B.

Pettit attended Nelson College from 1899 to 1903. He was appointed a Member of the Order of the British Empire in 1919.
