= A. Donald Macleod =

American-Canadian academic and minister

The Reverend A. Donald MacLeod
- Born: Alistair Donald MacLeod; 1938 (age 87–88); Philadelphia, Pennsylvania, US
- Spouse: Judith Shone

Ecclesiastical career
- Religion: Christianity (Presbyterian)
- Church: Presbyterian Church in Canada; Presbyterian Church (USA)

Academic background
- Education: McGill University; Harvard University; Westminster Theological Seminary

Academic work
- Discipline: History
- Sub-discipline: Ecclesiastical history
- Institutions: Tyndale University College and Seminary
- Website: adonaldmacleod.com

Alistair Donald MacLeod (born 1938) is a former research professor of church history at Tyndale University College and Seminary in Toronto.

Macleod was born in Philadelphia, Pennsylvania, and studied at McGill University, Harvard University, and Westminster Theological Seminary. He was ordained as a minister in the Presbyterian Church in Canada, and served as a pastor and church planter. He was president of the Evangelical Fellowship of Canada from 1973 to 1975 and General Secretary of the Inter-Varsity Christian Fellowship of Canada from 1975 to 1980. He then helped establish the Renewal Fellowship of the Presbyterian Church in Canada, and served as its Chairman from 1980 to 1985.

MacLeod has written a number of biographies of figures in church history, including W. Stanford Reid, C. Stacey Woods, and Charles Cowan. He has been awarded Doctor of Divinity degrees from both Gordon–Conwell Theological Seminary and Westminster Theological Seminary.
