= Campus by the Sea =

Camp on Santa Catalina Island, California

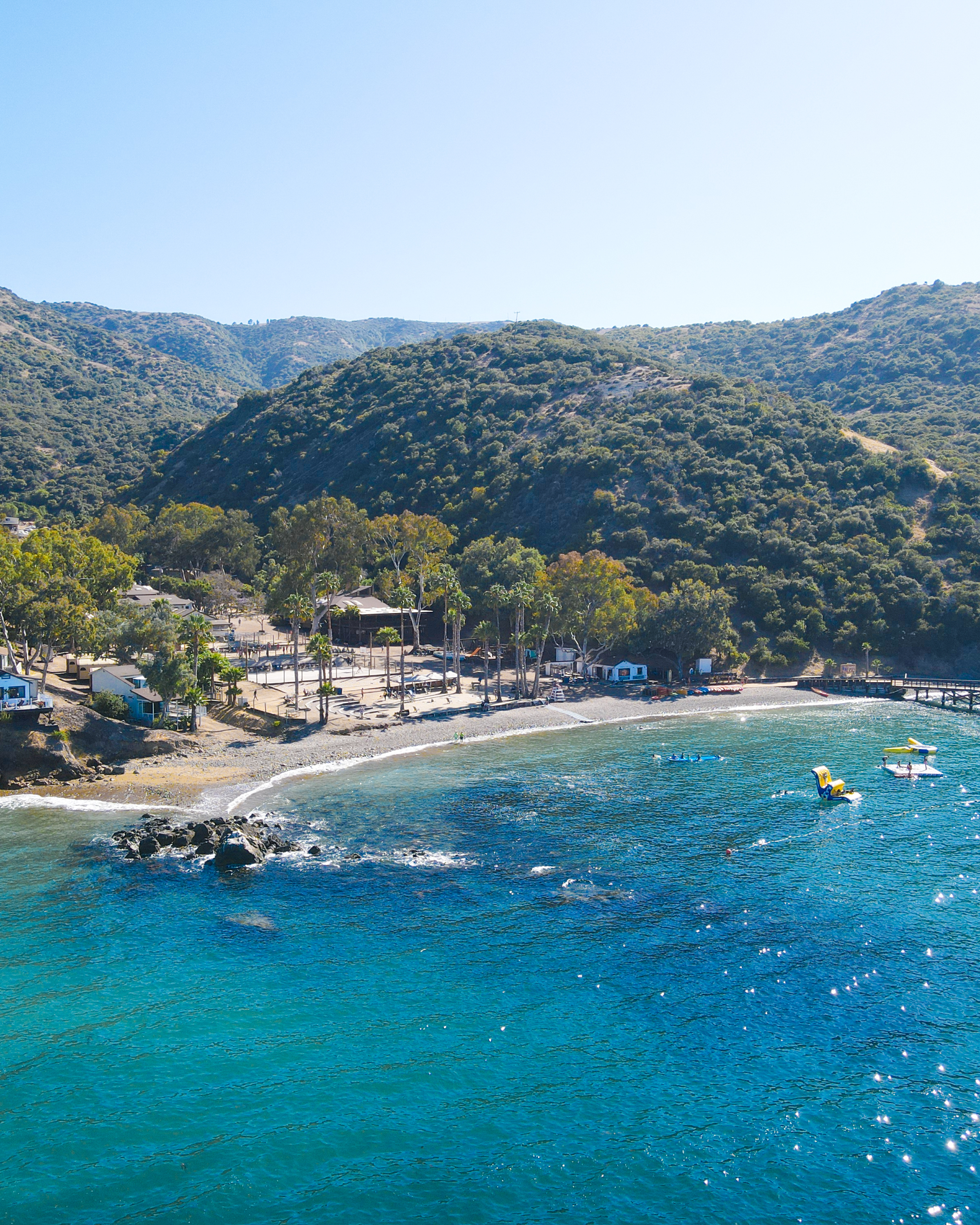
- InterVarsity's Campus by the Sea, on Santa Catalina Island
- Interactive map of Campus by the Sea
- Location: Santa Catalina Island, California, USA
- Coordinates: 33.370307°N 118.348715°W
- Operated by: Campus by the Sea, Inc.
- Established: 1951
- Website: www.campusbythesea.org

Campus by the Sea (CBS) is a Christian camp and is located at Gallagher's Cove on Santa Catalina Island, California, United States. The oceanfront camp was founded in 1951 by Mel Friesen and other Intervarsity leaders to establish a place for student discipleship during the summer. Today CBS offers its signature Summer Youth and Family Camp programs to help adults, teens and younger kids navigate their faith in a world of mixed messages. The camp also hosts guest rental groups from churches, Christian schools, and other ministries so they can “come away, meet God, and be renewed.” InterVarsity still uses the camp for student discipleship during the Fall and Spring. CBS’s all-inclusive pricing includes lodging, meeting rooms, meals on the ocean-view veranda, and all recreation and equipment (snorkeling, paddle boarding, kayaking, hiking, sand volleyball, basketball, tide pools, disc-golf, and more).

CBS is often noted as the birthplace of the "Mark Study," an in-depth inductive study of the Gospel of Mark. The originator of the inductive method (and co-founder of CBS) was Paul Byer. Byer graduated from the University of Southern California and was on the staff with InterVarsity there for many years. A copy of his original Mark manuscripts (along with teaching notes and other documents) can now be found on display in the library of CBS's building, named the "Crow's Nest", which opened in late summer 2006.

== History ==
Campus By the Sea has gone through many stages of development since its founding. After torrential downpours in the early months of 1980, the narrow valley in which the facilities are located was flooded. The swiftly moving creek which normally ran along one side of valley, overran its banks, washing eight cabins and buildings out to sea. The fresh water plumbing was destroyed and the camp was on the edge of ruin. However, those loyal to the camp rallied to see that it was cleaned up and renovated. Frantic preparations began that spring for the summer camping season. Fund raising and blueprints had already begun for a new dining facility/multi-purpose building, and soon volunteer and professional construction teams arrived to make this a reality.

The new building, dubbed "The Lighthouse" for its first-in-camp use of Edison electricity, upgraded the service that Campus by the Sea was able to offer. (Prior to construction of the Lighthouse, the camp had relied upon generators for its power needs.) "The Lighthouse" was initially powered also powered by a generator, but it drew so much fuel that it was only turned on when camps were in. Within a year or two, this was deemed unsustainable, and three electrical/telephone poles were installed. A "winterized" facility (that is, insulated), the addition of "The Lighthouse" and some enclosed cabins enabled the camp to extend its booking dates late into the fall, and to start much earlier in the spring. A core of year-round staff was hired and retained to meet the needs of this expanded camping schedule.

The rest of the 1980s was a time of continued development at Campus by the Sea. Two historic cabins, "Rock Cod" and "Sea Horse", were insulated, wired with electricity and expanded, in order to better house the year-round staff. Electricity and telephone lines expanded during the 1980s as well. A permanent pier set on pilings was installed in the winter of 1986/87, replacing the rope-and-pulley shuttle system which had been the means of bringing campers from boat to shore for over 35 years. This, along with a central bathroom-shower pavilion built in 1990, prepared the camp for year-round use. However, the camp still usually closes down for two months, from mid-December to mid-February. This is usually the worst weather season for Catalina due to high waves and downpours.

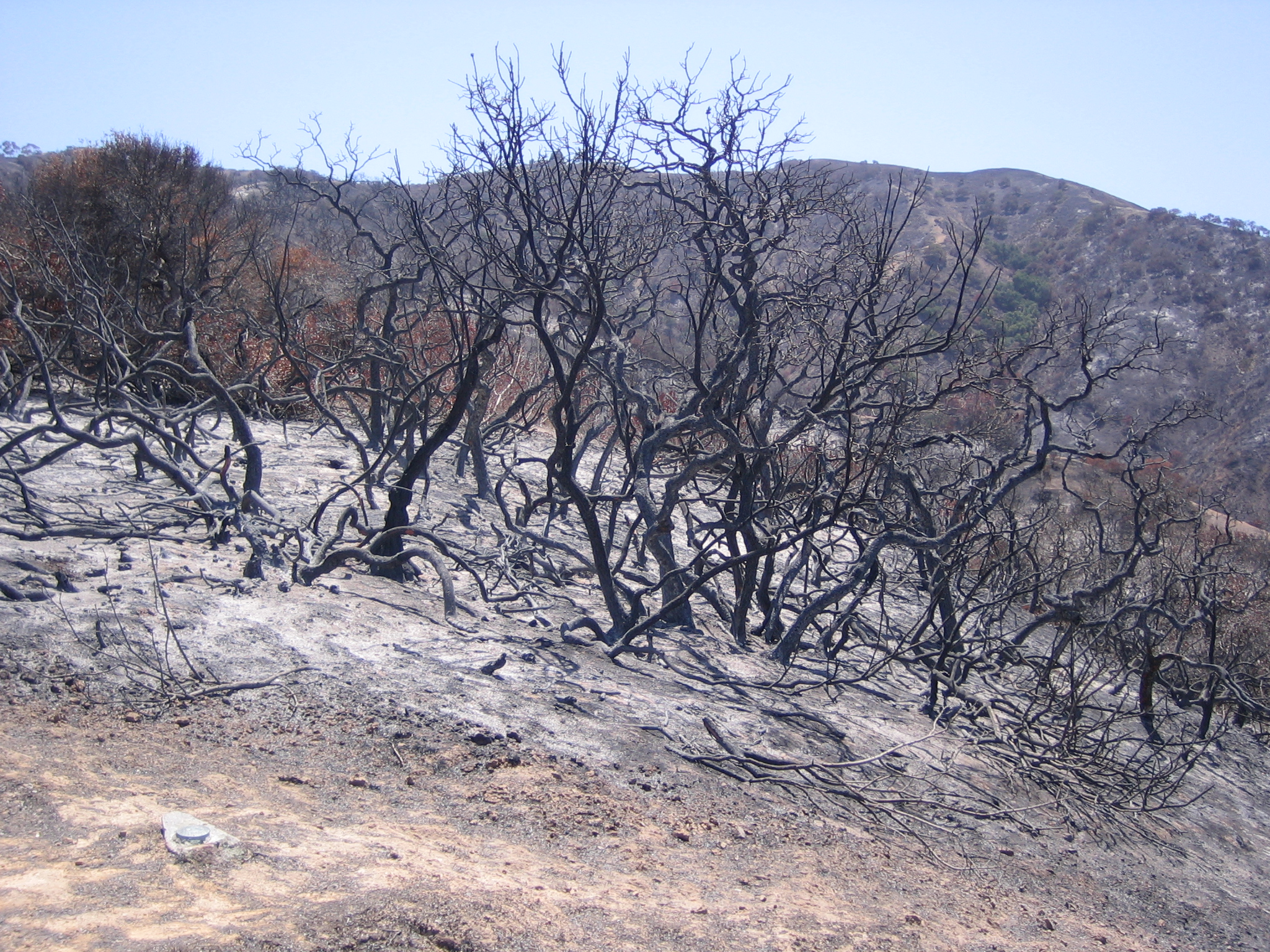
Fires threatened CBS in 2007

Development of Campus By the Sea continued through the 1990s. Notably, three cottages were constructed in the back of the canyon to add an element of privacy and permanent housing for the year-round staff. A maintenance shed was also built outside the main part of camp to provide a safe work area for mechanics in which to service the numerous boats and heavy equipment that are so necessary to the camp's operation.

In May 2007, wildfires on Santa Catalina Island came dangerously close to the camp and threatened several buildings. At seemingly the last moment, winds shifted and the camp escaped relatively unscathed.
