= Northgate Hall =

Former church in Oxford, England

Coordinates: 51.7535°N 1.2594°W

Location of Northgate Hall within central Oxford

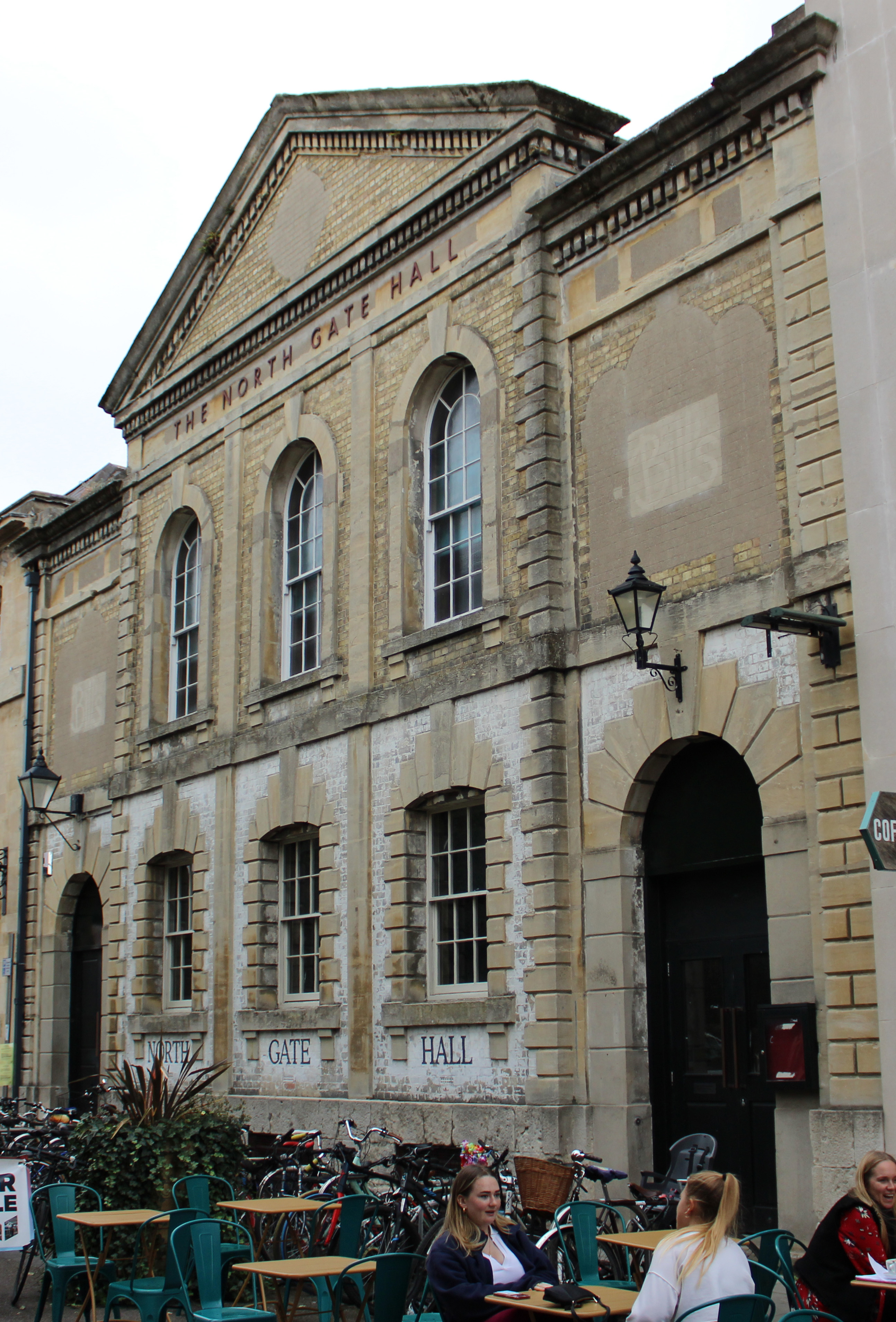
The Northgate Hall in 2022

The Northgate Hall is the home of Oxford Presbyterian Church. Situated at the 18 St Michael's Street, Oxford, England, the building was until recently owned by Oxford City Council.

It was built in 1870–71 as a United Methodist Free Church chapel and schools to the designs of J. C. Curtis. Until the twentieth century it was described as being in New Inn Hall Street, as what is now St Michael's Street was then known as New Inn Hall Street East. It is a Grade II Listed Building.

== History of use ==
The following report in Jackson's Oxford Journal of 15 October 1870 describes the new building:

METHODIST FREE CHURCH, NEW INN HALL STREET [now St Michael's Street].

The congregation at present assembling in the Old Quaker's Chapel have a new Chapel in course of erection in New Inn Hall-street. The site is on that portion of the old city walls whereon stables were lately built, and in digging for the foundation the workmen came upon one of the bastions in a state of perfect preservation, but part of it had to be removed for the new erection. The building will be in the Grecian Doric style of architecture, from the designs of Mr. J. C. Curtis, Mr. Dover being entrusted with the contract. It is to be 52 feet in length and 48 feet in breadth, comprising two storeys, on the basement being the schools, and above the chapel, with the chapel-keeper's residence and other necessary offices. The chapel will accommodate about 500 people, and the contractor anticipates finishing the work before March next, although we believe the stipulated time is the last day in January. The site is held on a lease from the Corporation for 75 years, and the total cost, inclusive of the lease, is estimated at £1500.

It was renamed the Northgate Hall in the late 1920s. Following Methodist Union in 1932 the building was no longer needed by the Methodists as the Wesley Memorial Church was only about 100 m away. In 1933, it was purchased by five Brethren men, led by Montague Goodman. In 1934, the Oxford Inter-Collegiate Christian Union (OICCU) began meeting in the basement for daily prayer meetings, before Goodman gave the Hall to OICCU in 1948. After this, it was held in trust for OICCU and administered by the OICCU Standing Committee, made up of former Presidents and local church leaders. Financial constraints and the increasing cost of repairs forced OICCU to leave the Hall in the summer of 1989.

In 1991 Sir Ian McKellen opened the Oxford Lesbian and Gay Community Centre at the Northgate Hall, and it remained here until 2004. Also from 1991 it was the home of the Gatehouse, a drop-in centre for homeless people set up by churches in the centre of Oxford. In 2001, it suffered damage from a fire.

The Gatehouse remained in part of the building, but in January 2011 the City Council issued a statement that they were giving it notice to move out, citing financial pressures and the fact that the building was underoccupied as users of other parts of the building had left. Gatehouse moved to new premises in 2012.

From 2013 to 2020 the former hall was occupied by the Bill's Oxford restaurant.

The lease of the whole building was sold in 2022, and in November that year a planning application was approved for change of use from a restaurant back to its original function as a chapel and church hall. It is now the home of Oxford Presbyterian Church, a congregation of the Evangelical Presbyterian Church in England and Wales. On 27 March 2025, Oxford Presbyterian Church purchased the freehold of the building from Oxford City Council for £3,500,000. As of 2026, the building is undergoing extensive conversion works to return it to its original design as a chapel.
