= Tom Lin (evangelical) =

Taiwanese American evangelical

Tom Lin (born February 13, 1973) is a Taiwanese-American evangelical and the eighth president of InterVarsity Christian Fellowship, an evangelical parachurch organization which works with university students.

== Biography ==
Raised in Chicago to Taiwanese immigrant parents, Lin earned a Bachelor of Arts (BA) in economics from Harvard University in 1994 and a Master of Arts (MA) in global leadership from Fuller Theological Seminary. In 2014, he earned a Master of Business Administration (MBA) from Harvard Business School.

From 1994 until 2001, Lin helped to start local chapters of InterVarsity Christian Fellowship at Harvard University and Boston University, after which he was the Mongolia country director of International Fellowship of Evangelical Students, from 2002 to 2006. Lin and his family returned to the United States in 2006, taking up various positions in InterVarsity Christian Fellowship, including directing the Urbana Student Missions Conference and, in August 2016, becoming the organization's first non-white president. Lin believes he was appointed the position because of his leadership in crossing racial, cultural, and ethnic barriers.

In 2018, InterVarsity had over 1,000 chapters of its organization on 700 college campuses and Lin set a goal of establishing chapters on 2,500 college campuses.

== Controversy ==
In 2015, then president-elect Lin and interim president of InterVarsity Jim Lundgren issued a 20-page position paper highlighting views on divorce, extramarital sex, and gay marriage, and initiating a process of involuntary terminations of staff who disagreed with these positions. Critics have held that this marginalizes members who are LGBTI or supporters of same-sex marriage.

== Works ==
- Lin, Tom (2012). Pursuing God's Call. InterVarsity Press. ISBN 9780830866007.
- Lin, Tom (1997). Losing Face & Finding Grace: 12 Bible Studies for Asian-Americans. InterVarsity Press. ISBN 9780830816842.
