= St Michael's Street, Oxford =

Street in central Oxford, England

Coordinates: 51°45′12″N 1°15′35″W

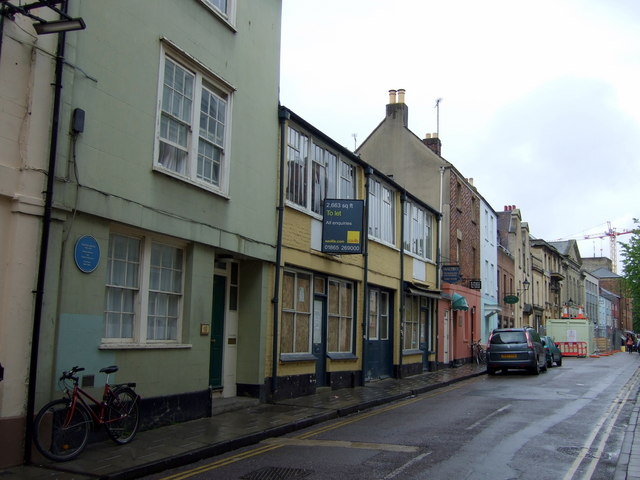
Looking east along St Michael's Street.

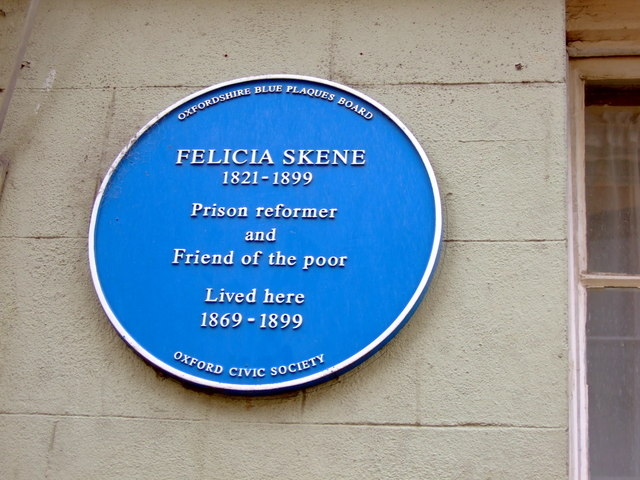
Blue plaque for Felicia Skene at 34 St Michael's Street.

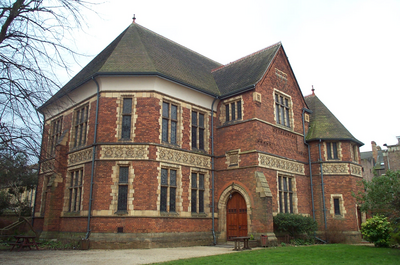
The Oxford Union debating chamber, off St Michael's Street.

St Michael's Street is a street in central Oxford, England. It runs between New Inn Hall Street to the west and Cornmarket to the east, with Ship Street almost opposite.

Northgate Hall is located here. Also to be found off the street is the debating chamber of the Oxford Union, a leading student society in the University of Oxford. Vanbrugh House at No. 20 is of particular architectural note as being "almost a parody of Blenheim" according to Pevsner.

There is a blue plaque, installed on 2 July 2002 by the Oxfordshire Blue Plaques Board, for the prison reformer Felicia Skene (1821–1899), located at 34 St Michael's Street.
