= Laidlaw College =

Coordinates: 36.88056°S 174.63064°E

- Te Wānanga Amorangi
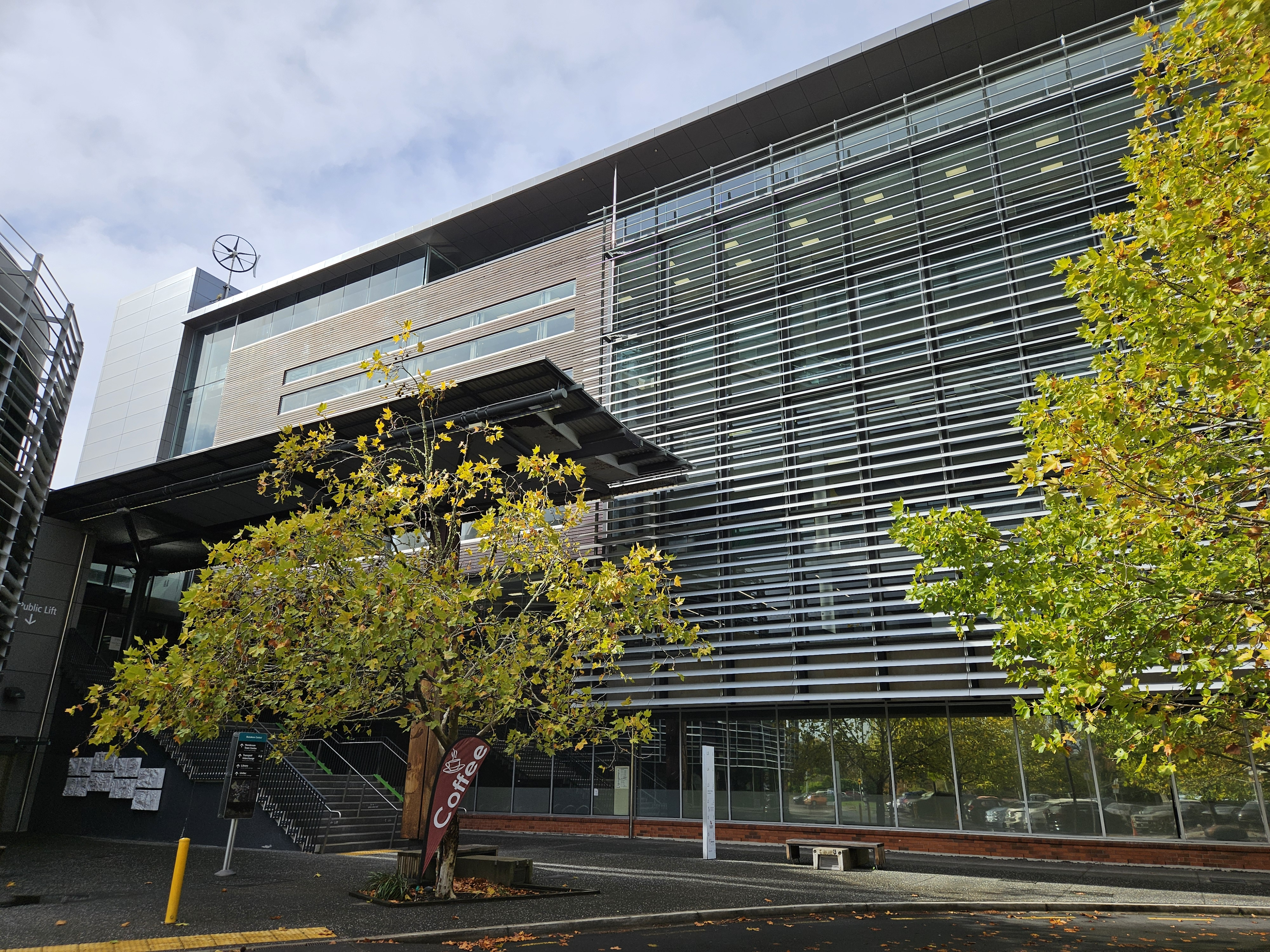
- 3 Smythe campus of Laidlaw College
- Type: Theological school
- Established: 1922
- Principal: Dr Roshan Allpress
- Location: Auckland, Christchurch, New Zealand
- Website: www.laidlaw.ac.nz

Laidlaw College (previously known as the Bible College of New Zealand) is an evangelical Christian theological college based in Auckland, New Zealand. The college has a campus in Auckland (Henderson) and one in Christchurch. It offers an integrated suite of programmes in counselling, teacher education and theology from certificates through to degree level. Students can study onsite or online via distance learning - part or full time. Laidlaw College has also established key partnerships with a number of colleges and churches in New Zealand through its Centre for Church Leadership.

== History ==
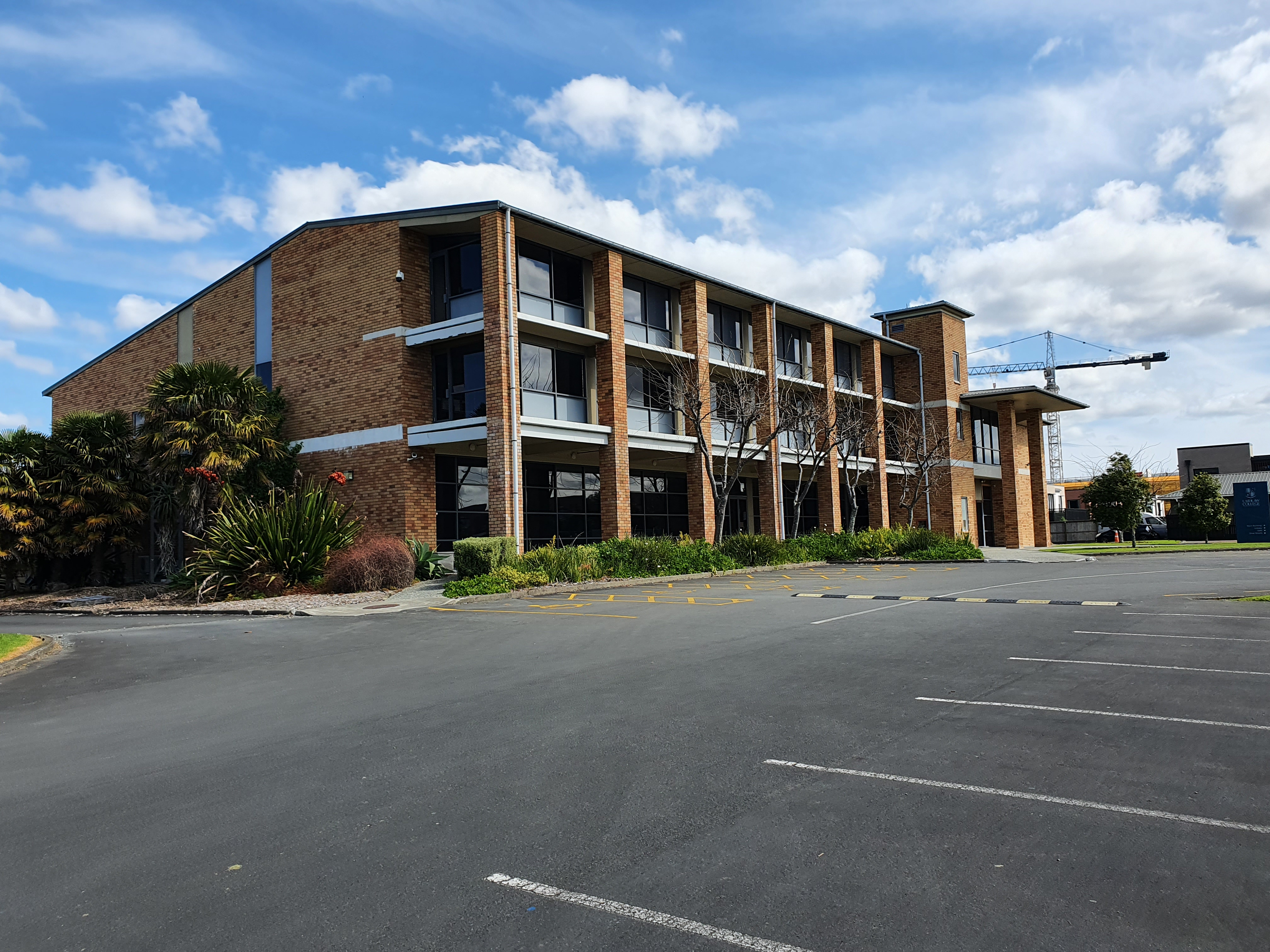
Former Central Park Drive campus of Laidlaw College

The college began in 1922 as the Bible Training Institute (BTI) under the leadership of Rev. Joseph Kemp, a Baptist preacher and pastor of the Auckland Baptist Tabernacle. In 1972 the institute was renamed the Bible College of New Zealand (BCNZ). In June 2008, BCNZ announced it had merged with MASTERS Institute, a school of education for training primary school teachers. In August 2008, the enlarged college was renamed Laidlaw College in honour of Robert Laidlaw, a founding trustee and longstanding president of the college.

In 2024, Laidlaw College moved to a new campus at Smythe Road in central Henderson, at the site of the former Waitakere City Council administrative offices. Elim Christian College established a new school at Laidlaw College's former campus.

== Academics ==
The college offers tertiary courses in biblical, theological, historical and pastoral studies, as well as professional degrees in teaching and counselling. Laidlaw offers programmes at Certificate, Diploma, Bachelors and Masters levels, as well as doctoral supervision. It is the highest ranked non-University research institute in New Zealand.

== See also ==
- Christianity in New Zealand
- Education in New Zealand
