= Tay Peng Hian =

Singaporean philatelist

- Born: Singapore
- Occupation: Philatelist

Tay Peng Hian FRPSL (born c. 1944) is a Singaporean businessman and philatelist who was appointed to the Roll of Distinguished Philatelists. He is a fellow of the Royal Philatelic Society London. Tay is a specialist in the philately of Burma and the Straits Settlements.

== Philatelic collection ==
Tay started collecting stamps since he was nine years old. Tay initially collected 1949-1964 stamps of modern China before selling it and then collected Canadian Queen Elizabeth II domestic rate stamps and post-war Germany stamps. Tay participated in the first Singapore National Stamp Exhibition in 1970 where he won the first prize with his German collection.

In 1974, Tay started to collect classic Straits Settlements stamps. In 1975, the collection won him the first Singapore National Gold medal and the Gold medal award in the Malaysian National Stamp Exhibition. In 1977, under the Asian arm of the Fédération Internationale de Philatélie (FIP), Tay participated in the first Asian International Stamp Exhibition, ASIANA'77, held at Bangalore, India with his Straits Settlements collection. It was awarded the Grand Prix International during the exhibition. The collection was then named P. H. Tay Grand Prix Collection after Tay. The collection was put up for auctioned in 1986 and sold for $1.5 million in 1987.

Tay was awarded the Ahli Mangku Negara (Kehormat) (Member of the Order of the Defender of the Realm, Honorary) by the Yang di-Pertuan Agong of Malaysia in 1993 for his service to philately. (Note: Set to see all 265 records)

In 1975, Tay became the Honorary Treasurer of the Federation of Inter-Asian Philately (FIAP) and was subsequently its secretary general and vice president. He became the president of FIAP in 1987.

In 1996, Tay was appointed to the Roll of Distinguished Philatelists.

In 2010, Tay was elected as the president of FIP and remained as president till 2018. After retiring from the post in 2018, FIP conferred Tay as Honorary President of FIP for his 16 years of service to FIP, including 8 years as FIP President. He also received the Medal of Service and Certificate of Appreciation for his efforts and contribution to Philately for over 30 years.

== Bibliography ==
- Tay, Peng Hian; Feldman Auction Galleries (Geneva) (1986). Straits Settlements: the P.H. Tay grand prix collection. Geneva: D. Feldman S.H. OCLC 421658891.

== Personal life ==
Tay is married and has a son and daughter.
