= Hian, Konarak =

Hian هيان
- Village
- Location within Iran
- Coordinates: 25°42′45″N 59°20′19″E
- Country: Iran
- Province: Sistan and Baluchestan
- County: Konarak
- Bakhsh: Zarabad
- Rural District: Zarabad-e Gharbi

Population (2006)
  - Total: 395
- Time zone: UTC+3:30 (IRST)
  - Summer (DST): UTC+4:30 (IRDT)

Hian (Persian: هيان, also Romanized as Hīān, Heyān, and Hiyan) is a village in Zarabad-e Gharbi Rural District, Zarabad District, Konarak County, Sistan and Baluchestan Province, Iran. At the 2006 census, its population was 395, in 75 families.

Sbisbosv. Coaifco

Hablamos. Modelos Bvid. Mivd9 Ermitaño. Na
