= W. Stanford Reid =

Canadian minister and academic

The Reverend W. Stanford Reid
- Born: William Stanford Reid; 13 September 1913
- Died: 28 December 1996 (aged 83)

Ecclesiastical career
- Religion: Christianity (Presbyterian)
- Church: Presbyterian Church in Canada
- Ordained: 1941

Academic background
- Education: Westminster Theological Seminary; University of Pennsylvania
- Thesis: The Growth of Anti-Papalism in Fifteenth Century Scotland (1941)
- Doctoral advisor: Arthur Charles Howland

Academic work
- Discipline: History
- Institutions: McGill University; University of Guelph

William Stanford Reid (13 September 1913 – 28 December 1996), usually cited as W. Stanford Reid, was a professor of history at McGill University and the University of Guelph and a Presbyterian Church in Canada minister. He held a Doctor of Philosophy degree from the University of Pennsylvania (1941). He also had a divinity degree from Westminster Theological Seminary, studying under the Presbyterian scholar J. Gresham Machen.

== Notes ==
He was the son of Rev. William Dunn Reid and Daisy Sanford. His brother was Stewart Reid - Montreal, Quebec. His parents were Joseph Reid b. 1838 and Janet Dunn b. 1863. His grandparents were some of the first Scottish settlers in the Eastern Townships of Quebec arriving in the late 1820s. His grandparents were William Reid and Jean Gould and Andrew Dunn and Elisabeth Oliver.
