= Don MacLeod (businessman) =

South African cricketer

Cricket information
- Batting: Right-handed
- Bowling: Right-arm medium

Career statistics
Competition	First-class
Matches	4
Runs scored	57
Batting average	11.40
100s/50s	0/0
Top score	18
Balls bowled	492
Wickets	9
Bowling average	20.66
5 wickets in innings	0
10 wickets in match	0
Best bowling	3/42
Catches/stumpings	1/-
- Source: ESPNcricinfo, 9 May 2022

Donald George MacLeod (born 2 March 1947) was a South African cricketer who played in four First-class matches from 1967 to 1971 and who subsequently played a leading role in the South African sugar industry.

A right-arm medium and right-hand bat, MacLeod played all his first class matches for the Natal B team, taking 9 wickets and scoring 57 runs. His first match was in January 1968 against the Orange Free State and his subsequent matches during the holiday period (18 December to 18 January) of the 1970/71 season.

He became president of the Natal Cricket Union (1991–92) and an executive member of the South African Cricket Union (1987–90) and after its merger with the South African Cricket Board of the United Cricket Board of South Africa (1991–94).

After completing degrees at the Universities of Natal and Oxford, he pursued a management role in the sugar industry, becoming managing director of Illovo Sugar in 1992 and chairman of the board in 2012. He was also chairman of the South African Sugar Millers Association Limited from 1995 to 1997. During his tenure as managing director, he negotiated the May 1997 R1.6 billion ($225 million, £128 million) deal to merge Lonhro's sugar interests with those of Illovo, making Illovo the largest sugar producer in Africa.
