= Inter Varsity Folk Dance Festival =

- Dates: A weekend within February or the first 2 weeks of March
- Location: Changes every year
- Years active: 1951–present
- Organised by: Student folk societies

The Inter Varsity Folk Dance Festival (IVFDF) is the longest-running folk festival in the United Kingdom, running annually since 1951.

The festival is organized and hosted by university folk societies, and is held in a different location each year. Former students and folk music enthusiasts gather at the host university for a weekend of music, dance, and song. The festival at Exeter University in 2009 was attended by around 1169 different ticket holders — the most of any IVFDF up to that time, as the previous record was just over 1000 attendees at the IVFDF in Manchester in 1986.

The festival was held online in 2021 due to the COVID-19 pandemic, hosted by people based in Bristol. The most recent festival was held in York, in 2026.

== History ==
The first festival was held in 1951 under the name "Universities' Folk Dancing Festival", hosted in the city of Leeds. The festival was jointly organized by the Hull University College Folk Dance Society and the Leeds University Scottish Dance Society, however, Leeds was chosen over Hull as the location for the festival due to its accessibility and better facilities at the time. The following two festivals were hosted under this name before the term Inter-Varsity was used for the 1954 festival hosted in Edinburgh.

Initially, the primary activity at the festival was the "Display Ceilidh", during which the university groups in attendance would take turns to perform dances as a demonstration to the other groups. The dances presented could be newly choreographed or traditional and could be chosen to raise awareness of a particular folk style or show the group's skill. In some early festivals, a dance was also held in the evening after the Display Ceilidh, and by the 1959 festival, this had been expanded to two evening dances.

The festival has never been held in the same host city two years consecutively, with 22 different cities hosting thus far. The most frequent hosts have been Sheffield and Exeter, totaling 11 and 8 festivals, respectively.

Top 10 most frequent IVDF host cities
Host city	Number of festivals hosted	Last festival hosted
Sheffield	11	2025
Exeter	8	2023
Edinburgh	7	2019
Nottingham	6	2020
Manchester	5	1994
Cambridge	4	2017
Bristol	3	2021
Durham	3	2010
Glasgow	3	2000
Newcastle	3	1990

=== Mascot Kidnapping ===
Many of the member societies that attend IVFDF choose to bring their Mascots along for the weekend (typically a stuffed toy). As such they are considered to be a large part of the festival. In the years leading up to the 2001 festival 'Mascot Kidnapping' occurred, with the mascot being ransomed and only returned at the end of the weekend in "good(ish) order". Although intended to be good natured, at the 2001 Cambridge festival this practice had to be officially banned after several people sustained injuries and some mascots were damaged.

== List of IVFDF events ==
All IVDF events. Cities in bold are first-time hosts.
Year	Host city	Host university	Dates	Festival website	Visitors	Events/performers	Notes
1951	**Leeds**	Leeds	17 February				It was known as the Universities' Folk Dancing Festival. The event was jointly organised by the Hull University College Folk Dance Society and the Leeds University Scottish Dance Society.
1952	**Newcastle**						
1953	**Sheffield**						
1954	**Edinburgh**		13 February		480 visitors		First festival to use the IVFDF name.
1955	**Birmingham**		12 February		600		
1956	**Manchester**						
1957	**Bristol**		16 February			Featured a Morris Tour	
1958	**London**						
1959	**Nottingham**		31 January		750		
1960	**Glasgow**		13 February				
1961	Leeds		11 February				
1962	Manchester		17 February				
1963	London		2 February				
1964	Sheffield		8 February				
1965	Newcastle		20 February				
1966	**Liverpool**		19 February				
1967	**Exeter**		25 February				
1968	**Hull**		2 March		800		
1969	Glasgow	Strathclyde, a sub-university of Glasgow	8 February				
1970	**Reading**		13–14 February		600		Extended to a 2-day festival since a ceilidh was arranged for those who were staying overnight on Friday.
1971	Nottingham		6 February				
1972	**Durham**		12 February				
1973	Liverpool		3 February				
1974	**Oxford**						
1975	London		22 February				
1976	Edinburgh						
1977	Manchester						
1978	**Southampton**						
1979	**Norwich**	University of East Anglia					
1980	Durham						
1981	Leeds						
1982	Reading						
1983	Nottingham						
1984	Sheffield						
1985	Southampton						
1986	Manchester		28 February				
1987	Reading		27 February – 1 March		200		
1988	Edinburgh						
1989	Exeter						
1990	Newcastle						
1991	Nottingham						
1992		University of East Anglia					
1993	Sheffield						
1994	Manchester						
1995	Exeter						
1996	Edinburgh						
1997	**Cambridge**	Anglia Polytechnic University	28 February – 2 March		800		Held in Anglia Polytechnic University and venues around the city.
1998	Sheffield						
1999	Exeter						
2000	Glasgow						
2001	Cambridge						
2002	**St. Andrews**						
2003	Sheffield						
2004	Exeter						
2005	Norwich		25–27 February				
2006	Cambridge	Cambridge University	24–26 February		1000+	Many dance teams, including Stone the Crows, Black Swan Rapper, and Pig Dyke Molly. The usual complement of university-based teams from all over the country.	Organised by a committee made up of students and ex-students belonging to the universities' three folk orientated societies (Gog Magog Molly, The Round and The Strathspey, and Reel Society). Because Cambridge does not have a single large students union building, they hired a local school to accommodate the attendees. Workshops were held in various rooms, including the gym and sports hall, sessions were held in the library and common room, and people slept in the maths classrooms.
2007	Edinburgh	Edinburgh University	2–4 March			Bands included Peeping Tom and John Dipper. It has demonstration dances, including Scottish and a dance to the soundtrack of The Sound of Music.	
2008	Sheffield		29 February – 2 March		1000+	Bands and artists that appeared were Glory Strokes (Pete Rees), Vertical Expression (Andrew Swaine), The Gloworms (Nick Walden), Janiver (formed from previous Jabadaw members), and Triple Scotch. There was also a concert with Crucible, Spiers & Boden.	
2009	Exeter		27 February-1 March	Festival website (Archived 12 February 2009)	1169 (most of any IVFDF)	The lineup included Kate Rusby, The Demon Barbers, and Jackie Oates, who also appeared with Jim Causley. Main ceilidhs were provided by The Committee Band and Stomp with over 40 workshops taking place over the weekend, as well as the Survivor's Ceilidh.	All events were back on one site, including sleeping, food and all the late night sessions.
2010	Durham	Durham university	5–7 March	Festival website (ivfdf.org archive)		The lineup included Eliza Carthy and Aidan Curran, Whapweasel and Martyn Harvey, Vertical Expression, Fidola, alongside workshops and a Morris Tour.	
2011	Bristol		25–27 February	Festival website Archived 22 July 2011			
2012	**Aberdeen**		2–4 March	Festival website (Archived 11 October 2020)			
2013	Sheffield		1–3 March	Festival website Archived 14 May 2013			
2014	Edinburgh		28 February – 2 March	Festival website (Archived 23 December 2014)			
2015	Exeter		27 February – 1 March	Festival website (Archived 1 March 2015)			Held in the 'new buildings' of the University of Exeter and the Great Hall.
2016	**Coventry**	University of Warwick	26–28 March	Festival website			Used Coventry Cathedral as a dance venue.
2017	Cambridge		24–26 February	Festival website (Archived 11 May 2017)			
2018	Sheffield	Sheffield University	23–25 February	Festival website		The lineup included Melrose Quintet, Buddy System, Steamchicken, Emily and the Simons, and Scottish Measure.	First year the festival went completely gender free for all its calling and workshops.
2019	Edinburgh	Edinburgh University	1–3 March	Festival website		The lineup included Hoik, The Night Before, Monkey Box, No&Mi, An Conasg, Hekety, Science Ceilidh, Matthew Maclennan Dance Band, Naragonia, and Point Five.	
2020	Nottingham		6–8 March	Festival website		The lineup included Contrasaurus, Bearded Dragons, and several others.	
2021	Bristol (though online)						Organised by Bristol people; held online via Minecraft, Zoom, and Discord due to the COVID-19 pandemic.
2022	Sheffield		25–27 February	Festival website	600		
2023	Exeter		3–5 February	Festival website			
2024	York		16–18 February	Festival website			
2025	Sheffield		28 February–2 March	Festival website			
2026	York		27 February - 1 March	Festival website			

== ICBINI ==
I can't believe it's not IVFDF (ICBINI) is a smaller annual spin-off festival held in November. The first ICBINI was held at Exeter in 2002. ICBINI is like the main festival in many respects, in that it is held at a different location each year and hosted by student folk societies; however, if a suitable host cannot be found, a festival is not held that year. The activities are similar to those at IVFDF.

ICBINI events
Year	Location	Festival?	Additional
2002	Exeter		First ICBINI.
2003	Bristol		
2011	Exeter		
2012	Warwick		
2014	Warwick		Warwick Festival Announcement
2015	Lancaster		
2016	Exeter		Exeter Festival Announcement
2017	Bristol		
2018	N/A	None	
2019	York		
2020	N/A	None	Cancelled due to COVID-19 pandemic.
