= InterVarsity Christian Fellowship =

Christian campus ministry

InterVarsity Christian Fellowship/USA
- Founded: 1941
- Type: Christian Fellowship; Social Club; University Student Society; Non-profit 501(c)3 organization
- Purpose: U.S. college and university campuses
- Location: Madison, WI
- Key people: Tom Lin, president
- Affiliations: Chicago Agreement: Unity in Mission
- Revenue: $107M (2017–18)
- Employees: 1,669 (June 2019)
- Website: www.intervarsity.org

InterVarsity Christian Fellowship/USA (IVCF) is an evangelical Christian student movement with affiliate groups on university campuses in U.S. It is a member of the International Fellowship of Evangelical Students.

It is a collective campus ministry found in hundreds of American colleges whose collegiate members involve themselves in Christian student activist movements.

== Organization ==
InterVarsity is governed by a board of directors. Tom Lin became the eighth president of InterVarsity on August 10, 2016. The president works with a team of five Executive Vice Presidents. InterVarsity is a tax exempt organization under the provisions of Section 501(C)(3) of the Internal Revenue Code. In the fiscal year ending 30 June 2018, InterVarsity had $107M in revenue (with over 70% coming from charitable donations) and $106.6M in expenditures.

InterVarsity is a charter member of the Evangelical Council for Financial Accountability (ECFA), and uses more than 85% of its revenue for staff-worker salaries and other on-campus work. InterVarsity was rated 4 stars (out of 4) by Charity Navigator for eight straight years. Michael Thatcher, the president of Charity Navigator, reported: "Only 3% of the charities we evaluate have received at least 8 consecutive 4-star evaluations, indicating that InterVarsity Christian Fellowship/USA outperforms most other charities in America." In 2019 InterVarsity slipped just below the cut-off for the four-star rating, and based on the latest available IRS Form 990 data (for Fiscal Year 2020) is currently rated at three stars by Charity Navigator. However, InterVarsity continued to maintain a 100 percent score in Accountability and Transparency.

InterVarsity strives to maintain the highest level of accountability with its ministry partners and is also rated by sites such as Guidestar and MinistryWatch. InterVarsity (as of 2018) met 18 of the 20 Better Business Bureau's "Standards for Charity Accountability".

== History ==
InterVarsity Christian Fellowship/USA became an official organization in November, 1941. But the organization traces its roots to a movement of British university students, starting at Cambridge University in 1877. The movement spread to Canada before reaching the U.S. In 1938 Stacey Woods, the Canadian Inter-Varsity director, met with students on the University of Michigan campus. As an immediate result of that visit, students formed the first InterVarsity chapter in the United States. InterVarsity's first three staff members came on loan from Canada, and Stacey Woods served as the organization's General Secretary (CEO). In 1947 InterVarsity USA became one of ten founding members of the International Fellowship of Evangelical Students, a federation of national Christian student movements. By 1950 there were 35 staff workers serving students in 499 InterVarsity chapters and by the early seventies, the on-campus staff had grown to more than 200.

In September 2019, the U.S. District Court for the Southern District of Iowa ruled that the University of Iowa violated the First Amendment when it expelled the group from campus for requiring its leaders to uphold Christian beliefs. A similar ruling was issued against Wayne State University in April 2021.

== Statement of Faith ==
In 2016, InterVarsity clarified its requirements for staff, asking that they affirm traditional, orthodox views of sexuality that are shared by most evangelical denominations. Staff are asked to affirm a twenty-page document which affirms the Hebrew Bible and the New Testament sexual ethic that limits sexual expression to marriage between a man and a woman. However, this change in policy has prompted controversy, especially from LGBTQ Christians and their supporters.

== Ministries ==
=== College ministry ===
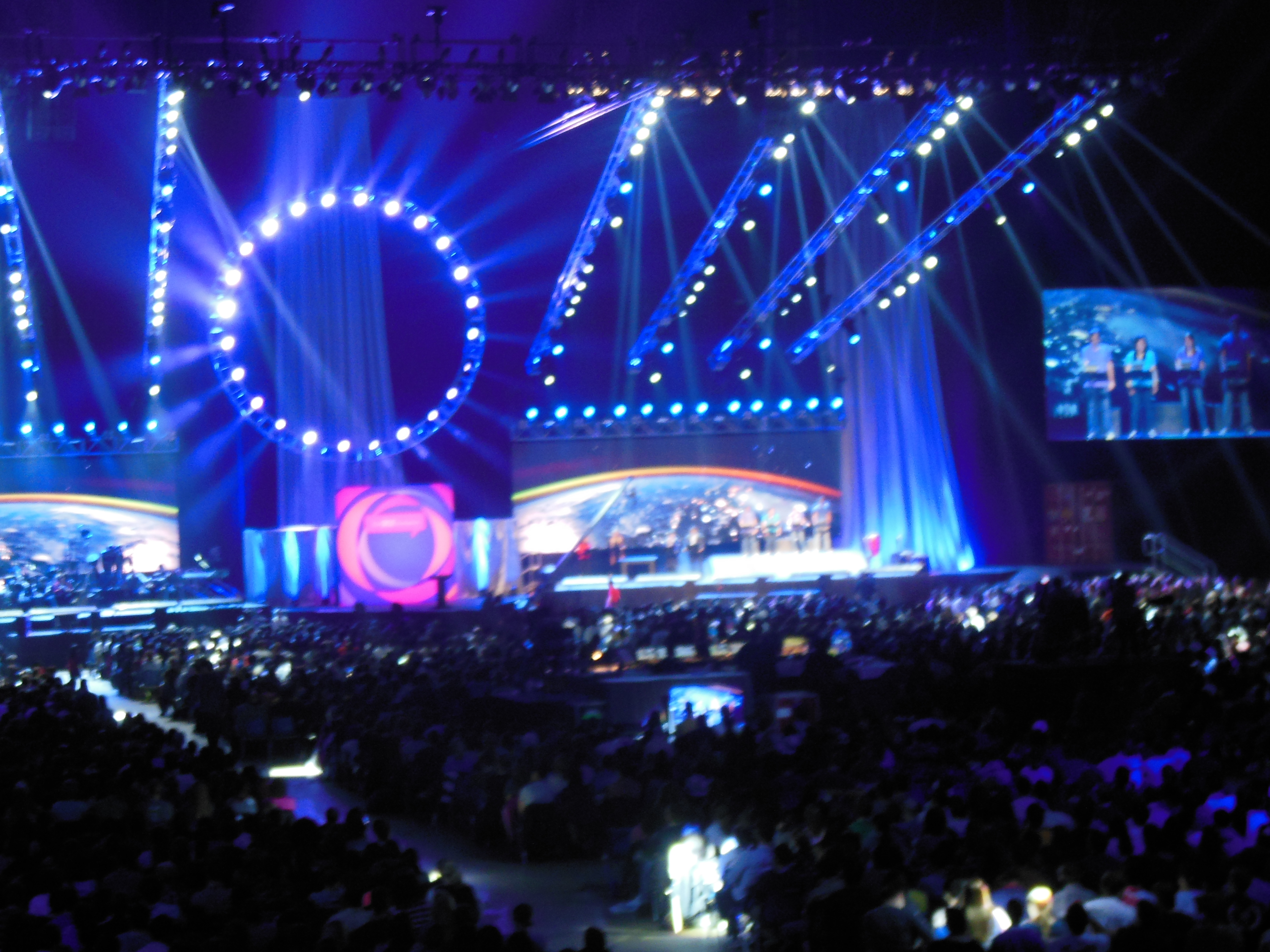
The opening plenary session at Urbana 12, InterVarsity's 2012 Student Missions Conference, in the Edward Jones Dome in St. Louis

Of the 772 campuses where InterVarsity is present, many have multiple chapters which might focus individually on Greek life students, international students, nursing students, graduate students, athletes, artists, and members of ethnic minorities, or be more generalized depending on the campus. These include 71 ethnic-specific chapters ministering to Blacks, Asians, Native Americans, Filipinos, and Latinos. Of the 34,750 active InterVarsity students, 15,198, or 44%, identify themselves as ethnic minority or multiracial students.

Nurses Christian Fellowship (NCF) is unique among the ministries of InterVarsity; it is a professional organization as well as a student ministry. In addition to campus ministry, NCF offers continuing education courses and the professional publication, Journal of Christian Nursing, to practicing nurses.

=== Bible study ===
Bible study has always been an important part of InterVarsity's campus ministry. InterVarsity staff worker Paul Byer is credited with developing the Manuscript Study method of inductive Bible study, a useful tool for inductive Bible studies. After graduating from the University of Southern California with a degree in architecture, Byer became one of the leading forces in InterVarsity, as both a campus staff worker and as the West Coast Regional Director, and was the developer of the Manuscript Study method. Through his innovative approach to Bible Study, extensive mentoring, and long tenure he helped shape the theology and culture of the entire movement. The Manuscript Study method continues to be used heavily by InterVarsity as one of many tools to help students investigate and learn from the teachings of the Bible.

Other early staff members laid more of the foundation for InterVarsity's commitment to Bible study. Jane Hollingsworth learned inductive Bible study in seminary and in turn trained staff members in the 1940s. She wrote the first Bible study guide published by InterVarsity, Discovering the Gospel of Mark. In the 1960s, veteran staff member Barbara Boyd developed what became the Bible and Life Training Courses, experienced by decades of students.

=== Missions ===
InterVarsity, as a member movement, participates in the global student ministry network, the International Fellowship of Evangelical Students (IFES), by sending staff and recent graduates to work under the authority of local IFES staff in countries around the world.

=== Training ===
InterVarsity operates several training centers, Campus by the Sea, Catalina Island, CA; Toah Nipi, Rindge, NH; Cedar Campus, Cedarville, MI; Bear Trap Ranch, Colorado Springs, CO; and, until recently, Forest Springs, WI. These camps are used for weekend conferences during the school year, week-long training sessions at the beginning and end of summer break, and faculty and alumni retreats.

=== Urbana ===
InterVarsity hosts the Urbana conference in North America; the conference runs every three years and the 2025 event was held in Phoenix, Arizona.

== InterVarsity Press ==
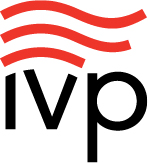
logo of InterVarsity Press

In 1947 the InterVarsity/USA Board of Trustees determined that the Fellowship should develop its own publishing arm. With this action, InterVarsity Press (IVP) became an official part of InterVarsity's ministry, overseeing the publication and distribution of books, booklets and Bible study guides in support of the campus work.

== See also ==
- International Fellowship of Evangelical Students
- Inter-Varsity Christian Fellowship of Canada
- Universities and Colleges Christian Fellowship (United Kingdom)
- InterVarsity Press

== Bibliography ==
- Howard, David M. (1979), Student Power in World Missions, InterVarsity Press, ISBN 0-87784-493-3. Brief history of North American students in mission beginning with the Haystack Movement through the SVM to the SFMF.
- Hunt, Keith & Gladys (1991). For Christ and the University: The Story of Intervarsity Christian Fellowship of the USA 1940–1990. InterVarsity Press. ISBN 978-0-8308-4996-3.
- Johnson, Douglas (1964), A Brief History of The International Fellowship of Evangelical Students, Lausanne, CH: IFES.
- LePeau, Andrew; Doll, Linda (2006). Heart. Mind. Soul. Strength. An Anecdotal History of InterVarsity Press, 1947–2007. InterVarsity Press. ISBN 978-0-8308-3369-6.
- Lowman, Pete (1988), The Day of His Power, Leicester: Inter-Varsity, ISBN 0-85110-794-X.
- Poynor, Alice (1986), From the Campus to the World: Stories from the First Fifty Years of Student Foreign Missions Fellowship, InterVarsity Press, ISBN 0-87784-947-1.
- Woods, C. Stacey (1978), The Growth of a Work of God, InterVarsity Press, ISBN 0-87784-741-X. Early history of InterVarsity/USA.
