= Donald McLeod (Minnesota politician) =

American politician (1912–2009)

Loyd Donald "Don" McLeod (August 5, 1912 – August 26, 2009) was an American farmer, businessman, and politician.

McLeod was born on a farm in Fremont, Winona County, Minnesota. He graduated from Lewiston High School in Lewiston, Minnesota in 1930. McLeod lived on a farm in Lewiston, Minnesota with his wife and family and had raised cattle, sheep, and hogs. He was also a businessman. McLeod served in the Minnesota House of Representatives from 1955 to 1962 and in 1965 and 1966. He also served as mayor of Lewiston, Minnesota was involved with the Republican Party. McLeod died at the Winona Community Hospital in Winona, Minnesota.
