= Campus Bible Study =

Campus Bible Study (or CBS) was established in 1975 at the University of New South Wales by the then Anglican chaplain Phillip Jensen. CBS celebrated its 50th anniversary in 2025, and continues to officially operate out of UNSW's Anglican Chaplaincy. The current Anglican Chaplain is Carl Matthei.

== Overview ==
During a typical week, CBS runs large public Bible-teaching meetings, many small-group Bible studies according to faculties, for example Christians in Medicine. Further training sessions in theology and ministry are also offered to students. CBS also runs three conferences per year, the largest one being Mid-Year Conference (MYC), which typically attracts 500-750 students. While officially linked to the movement of Sydney Anglicans, Campus Bible Study is non-denominational and welcomes everyone to their public meetings. CBS focuses on the Bible rather than particular denominations beliefs, and seeks to challenge individuals to consider the gospel of Jesus.

== University Churches ==
CBS also runs five different university churches for various groups of students living in the residential colleges at UNSW. Unichurch UNSW is an English speaking congregation. The Fellowship of Overseas University Students (FOCUS) at UNSW runs four congregations for international students — Mandarin, Cantonese, Indonesian, and International (English).

== Affiliations ==
CBS should not be confused with the Christian Union (CU), which (as of 2006) was a student-run, Student-Guild-affiliated organisation. CBS and the CU work in concert to conduct ministry on campus. Most members of CU are also members of CBS. CBS is also affiliated with the Australian Fellowship of Evangelical Students (AFES) but is not a member — the AFES group at UNSW is the Christian Union (CU).

Some members of Campus Bible Study have gone on to formal theological education.

== History ==
In 1975, Phillip Jensen was appointed to be the new Chaplain at the University of NSW, serving until 2005. From there the leadership was passed to Paul Grimmond and, after seven and a half years to Carl Matthei.
