= Chua Wee Hian =

Singaporean Evangelical

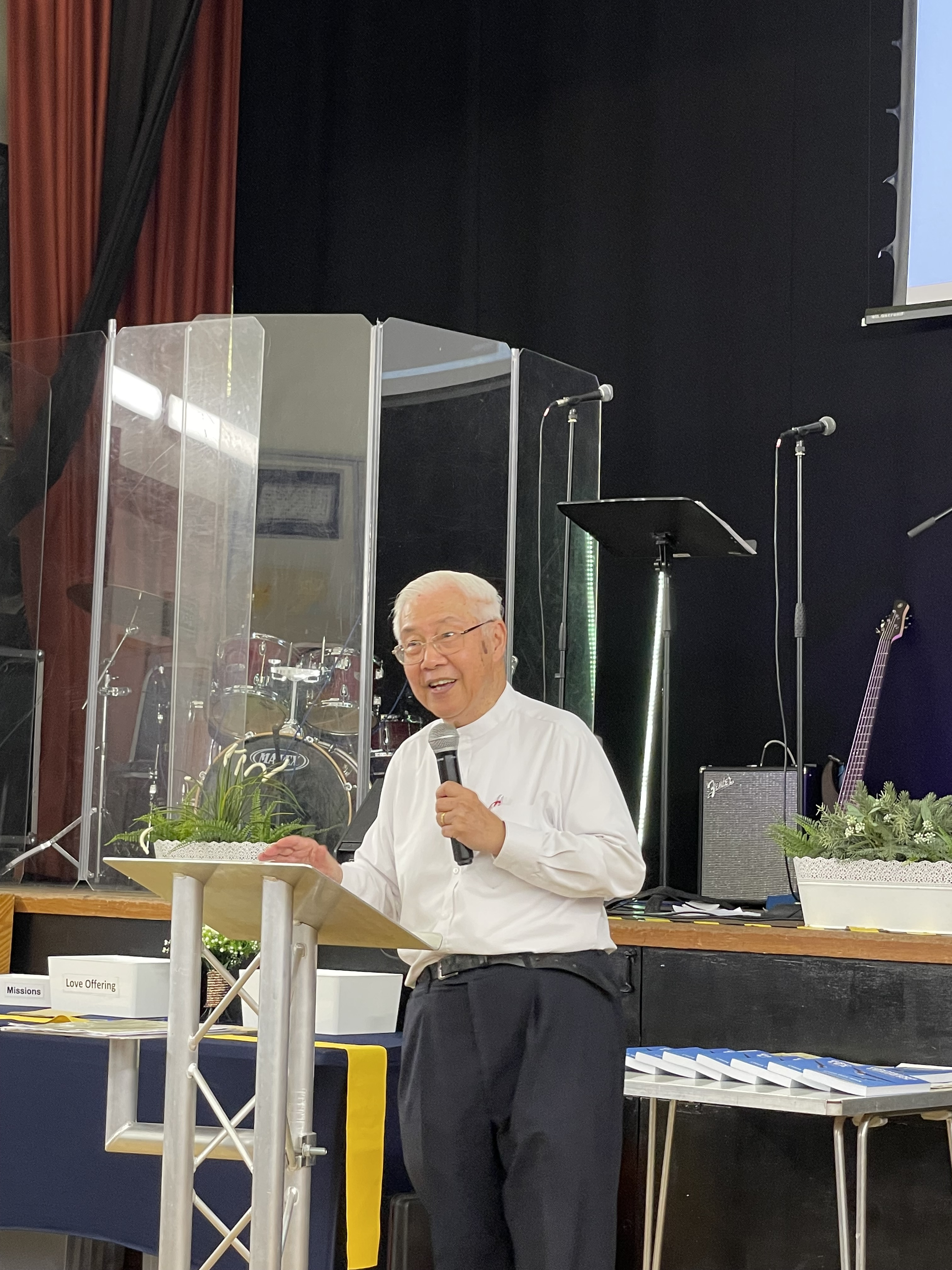
Chua Wee Hian in a speaking engagement

Chua Wee Hian (born 1939) is a Singaporean Evangelical, known for his longterm role as General Secretary of the International Fellowship of Evangelical Students from 1972 to 1991.

== Biography ==
Chua was educated at London Bible College and Fuller Theological Seminary. He held various positions in International Fellowship of Evangelical Students (IFES), as Associate General Secretary of East Asia and, from 1972 to 1991, serving as the organization's second General Secretary. After IFES, Chua served as senior pastor of Emmanuel Church in London from 1991 to 2008.

He is married to King Ling and they have three sons.

== Works ==
- Chua Wee Hian (1984). 'Dear Mum and Dad....': How to Honour Your Parents. Inter-Varsity Press. ISBN 0851104606.
- Chua Wee Hian (1987). Learning to Lead: Biblical Leadership Then and Now. Inter-Varsity Press. ISBN 978-0-85110-772-1.
- Chua Wee Hian (1992). Getting Through Customs: The Global Jottings of Chua Wee Hian. Inter-Varsity Press. ISBN 0851108695.
