= InterVarsity Choral Festival (Canada) =

The InterVarsity Choral Festival (IVCF) is an annual event in which university choirs from Ontario and Quebec, Canada, perform a combined concert. The festival is hosted and held on a rotational basis by the member choirs. In 1991, IVCF was hosted by McMaster University in Hamilton, Ontario. In 2007, IVCF was hosted by the University of Western Ontario Choir in London, Ontario. In 2008, the University of Ottawa hosted the event. In 2009, the Hart House Chorus (at the University of Toronto) hosted the event. In 2011, The University of Western Ontario Choir hosted IVCF.

== History of Canadian IVCF ==
The InterVarsity Choral Festival was founded in 1949 by the NFCUS (National Federation of Canadian University Students) who suggested that there be a regular competitive music festival in Ontario. The solution was a yearly festival of university choirs. The original participants were McMaster University (Mac), the University of Western Ontario (UWO) and University of Toronto's Victoria College. Ontario Agricultural College, Guelph, joined two years later.

By 1980, the festival had undergone some major changes. Toronto's Hart House Chorus and the Queens Choral Ensemble were now permanent participants while Guelph had dropped out. The competition was restructured into an adjudicated, non-competitive two-day festival, and Mary Willan Mason, a noted Toronto writer and daughter of Healey Willan, donated a cup to be presented to the host choir to recognise their efforts in organising the festival.

== Members of Canadian IVCF ==
=== Current members ===
- Hart House Chorus, University of Toronto
- Queen's Choral Ensemble, Queen's University
- Simply Sweetly, McGill University
- Trent University Concert Choir, Trent University
- University of Western Ontario Choir, University of Western Ontario
- Ensemble Calixa Lavallée, University of Ottawa
- University of Ottawa Choral Ensemble, University of Ottawa

=== Past members ===
- McMaster University Choir, McMaster University
- Ontario Agricultural College Union Philharmonic Choral Society, Ontario Agricultural College
- Polyhymnia, Queen's University
- Trinity Glee Club, University of Toronto
- University of Guelph Chorus, University of Guelph
- University of Toronto Chorus, University of Toronto
- University of Waterloo Choir, University of Waterloo
- Victoria College Choir, University of Toronto
