= Student Christian Movement of Great Britain =

British ecumenical religious charity

- Abbreviation: SCM
- Formation: 1889
- Purpose: youth-led Christian ecumenism
- Region served: Great Britain
- Affiliations: World Student Christian Federation
- Website: www.movement.org.uk

Student Christian Movement of Great Britain (SCM) is an ecumenical Progressive Christian student organization in Great Britain. Its main activities are focused on spirituality, issues of social, economic, and environmental justice, and building autonomous local communities on campuses across the country. It is part of the World Student Christian Federation.

== History ==
SCM began in 1889 as the Student Volunteer Missionary Union and set out to unite students with an interest in overseas mission, but it rapidly broadened its aims and became the largest student organisation in Britain. It went on to help establish the National Union of Students and the World University Service. Its first General Secretary was Tissington Tatlow. Without SCM, the Edinburgh conference, which was to give birth to the modern ecumenical movement, would never have taken place. SCM went on to play a vital role in the formation of the British and World Council of Churches and continued to be a leading voice on ecumenism. It founded the SCM Press which became one of the leading Theological publishers in the UK, attracting controversy with the publication of Honest to God in 1963.

In 1928 the Inter-Varsity Fellowship was formed by members of the SCM who disagreed with its liberal position.

Until the 1980s, SCM covered the whole of Britain and Ireland, but subsequently split into two organisations. However, both remain members of the World Student Christian Federation (WSCF). This period also saw the growing participation of Catholic students in what had previously been a Protestant organisation.

In February 2020, SCM appointed the Revd Naomi Nixon as chief executive officer.

== Activities ==
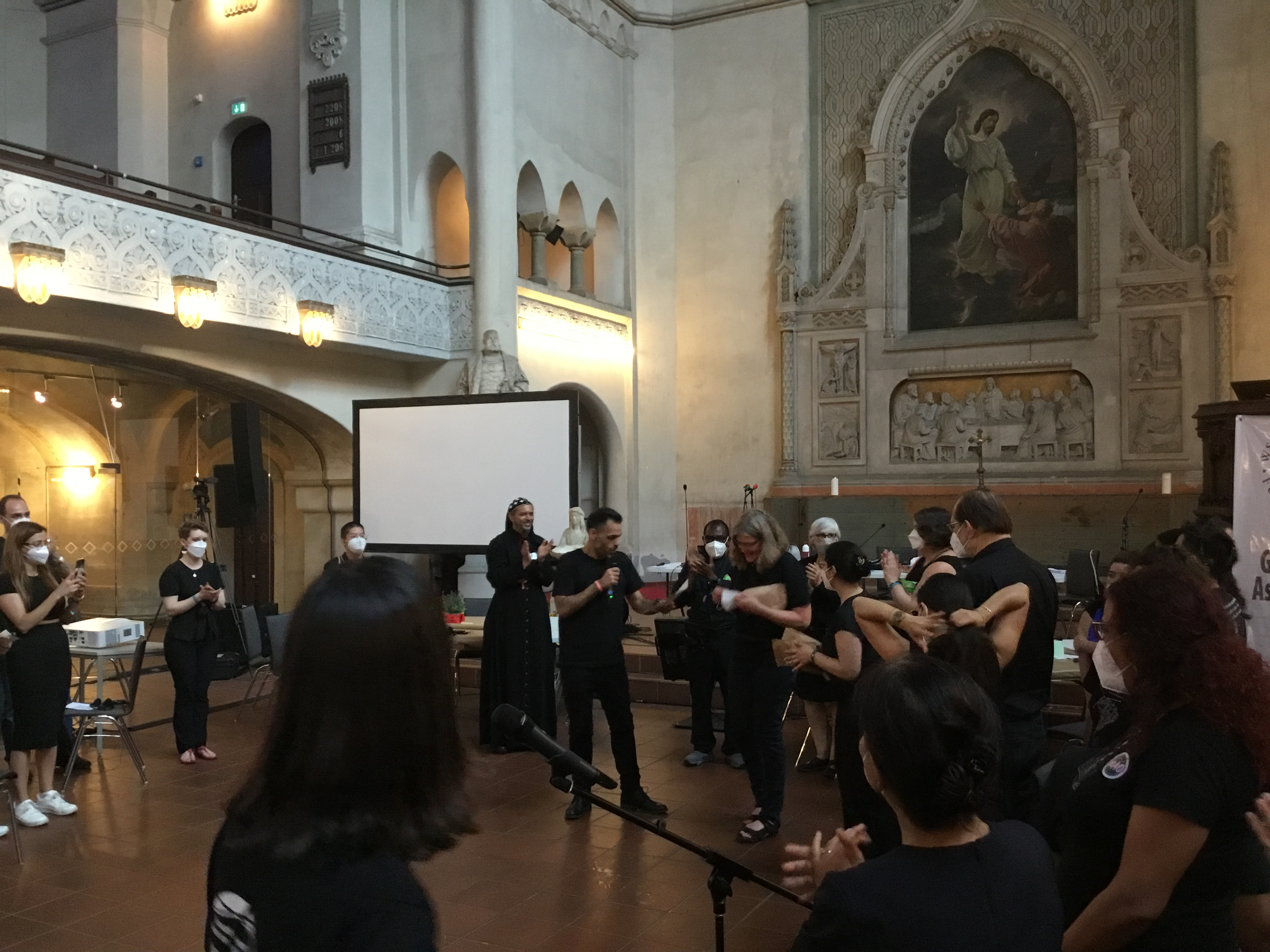
SCM participated in the 37th General Assembly of the World Student Christian Federation in Berlin, Germany.

=== University groups ===
SCM has links in approximately 60 universities and other higher education establishments across the United Kingdom, taking the form of either a student group or chaplaincy who subscribe SCM's aims and objectives. Some of the student groups carry the SCM name (for example, SCM Sheffield and SCM Leeds) whereas others do not (for example, Christian Focus York and Durham JAM). Some groups are denominational societies and are connected to a particular church, whereas many are ecumenical. The characteristics of each link vary, with SCM making no determinations as to how groups should be run, however, most SCM affiliated student groups follow the principle of student leadership. SCM also has a number of individual members (present or recent students) who want membership independent of a local group or chaplaincy; either because they want to support the movement, get more involved in the movement, or there is no local group for them to join.

=== Link churches ===
SCM has a number of "link churches" that support the aims of SCM with the aim of administering to students and young people. Each link church varies in how they support SCM, but many run student groups, promote SCM and its events, and celebrate Student Sunday.

=== Social issues ===
Responding to the Church of England's pastoral statement on civil partnerships in 2019, SCM made an official statement which reiterated its commitment to the full affirmation of LGBT+ people.

In August 2022, at the Greenbelt Festival, SCM launched its Honest Church campaign, whose purpose is to encourage churches to be transparent about their inclusion of LGBTQ+ people. In September 2023, the Oxford Safe Churches group published advice on which churches are "safe" for LGBT+ students, based on resources developed for the Honest Church campaign.
