= Universities and Colleges Christian Fellowship =

Evangelical Christian student organization

UCCF: The Christian Unions
- Formation: 1928
- Type: Christian evangelical student association
- Headquarters: Oxford, United Kingdom
- Director: Matt Lillicrap, since 2024
- Secessions: Student Christian Movement
- Affiliations: International Fellowship of Evangelical Students
- Website: uccf.org.uk
- Formerly called: Inter-Varsity Fellowship of Evangelical Unions (IVF)

Universities and Colleges Christian Fellowship (UCCF; also UCCF: The Christian Unions) is an evangelical Christian student movement with affiliate groups on university campuses in the United Kingdom. It is a member of the International Fellowship of Evangelical Students. The UCCF endorses a conservative evangelical form of Christian theology.

The Christian Unions provide opportunities for fellowship, bible study and evangelism, with nearly 40,000 students attending outreach events each year.

== History ==
The Universities and Colleges Christian Fellowship was formally established in 1928 as the Inter Varsity Fellowship, having emerged informally as a body influenced by the Cambridge Inter-Collegiate Christian Union earlier in the 1920s. CICCU had split from the broader Student Christian Movement (SCM) in 1910, following tensions between the two throughout the first decade of the 1900s. With a stronger conservative and evangelical presence than other Christian Unions, CICCU disagreed with SCM's move towards interdenominationalism and modernism (including the endorsement of newly emerging methods of Biblical criticism) and wanted a greater emphasis to be put on evangelism. An attempted reconciliation between the two groups in 1919 was ultimately unsuccessful, owing to CICCU's insistence on the centrality of the atonement for Christian faith, which SCM would not agree to. Evangelical students in the Oxford Inter-Collegiate Christian Union subsequently seceded from the SCM and, following a two-year reaffiliation, permanently left the SCM in 1927.

From 1919, under the influence of Norman Grubb, conservative evangelical students from UK universities began meeting at an annual conference in London. The first meeting produced a declaration critical of the Student Christian Movement, in particular criticizing its basis of faith for not mentioning the divinity of Christ and omitting any mention of sin, forgiveness, and salvation. In 1922, at the fourth annual meeting, it was decided to formally make the conference an annual event, as well as to appoint an executive committee and draft a constitution. The constitution of the Inter-Varsity Conference, which was accepted in 1923, included the group's doctrinal basis. The 1923 doctrinal basis included the "divine inspiration and infallibility of Scripture", the "universal sinfulness and guilt of human nature", and the "redemption from guilt, penalty and power of sin only through the sacrificial death... of Jesus Christ". Anyone who wanted to hold an official position in the running of the conferences had to sign the basis of faith, a requirement was created for prospective speakers to hold views in accordance with the basis, and the conference was prohibited from undertaking joint activities with groups that did not doctrinally align with the conference.

By 1928, the Inter-Varsity Conference became a permanent fellowship of evangelical Christian Unions and rival organisation to the SCM. After becoming the secretary of the Inter-Varsity Conference in 1924, King's College alumnus Douglas Johnson was chosen as the first and founding General Secretary of the Inter-Varsity Fellowship of Evangelical Unions (IVF) by delegates of the 1928 conference. He remained in this role until 1964.

In 1947, the Inter-Varsity Fellowship became a founding member of the International Fellowship of Evangelical Students (IFES). The movement developed out of links that had been established between the IVF and the Norwegian network of Christian Unions, the Norges Kristelige Studentlag. From 1934, regular international conferences took place between evangelicals connected to universities in Europe, North America, South Africa, and Australia; in 1947 the IFES was formally established. In 1997, UCCF-affiliated Christian Unions at universities on the island of Ireland formed an independent movement called IFES Ireland (later renamed Christian Unions Ireland).

Owing to the increasing number of IVF-affiliated Christian Unions in non-university colleges, the Inter-Varsity Fellowship changed its name to the Universities and Colleges Christian Fellowship in 1974.

Until 2007 UCCF continued to act as the umbrella organization for Christian Unions in institutions within both the higher education and further education sectors. In that year, UCCF, in co-operation with Scripture Union, launched Festive, an independent initiative focused on supporting Christian Union groups in further education and sixth form colleges.

=== Key staff ===
- Douglas Johnson, Secretary, 1928–64
- Oliver R. Barclay, General Secretary, 1964–80
- Robin Wells, General Secretary, 1980–92
- Richard Cunningham, Director, 2004–2024
- Matt Lillicrap, Chief Executive Officer, 2024-

=== Research ===
UCCF supports biblical research through Tyndale House, Cambridge, which opened in 1945 and became independent in 2015.

From the late 1980s and into this century, support for those involved in Christian ethics was provided through the Whitefield Institute, Oxford, founded by E. David Cook. In 2006, this was reconstituted to become the Kirby Laing Institute for Christian Ethics, now the Kirby Laing Centre for Public Theology.

== Theology ==
UCCF endorses a conservative evangelical form of Christian theology. Its doctrinal basis reflects typical elements of conservative evangelicalism, such as Biblical infallibility, the universal sinfulness of all humans, and penal substitution. Individual Christian Unions must subscribe to UCCF's doctrinal basis in order to be affiliated with them, and anyone who occupies a leadership position (including student executive committee members) or speaks at a Christian Union event must also sign to affirm their agreement.

The explicitly conservative evangelicalism of UCCF's doctrinal basis has led some to criticise the exclusivity of UCCF's theology. Biblical infallibility, the view that the Bible is completely true and sufficient for Christian belief and practice, is rejected by many Christian denominations. The doctrine of penal substitution is likewise rejected by many non-evangelical Christians. In some cases, UCCF's evangelical theology has led to Christian Unions having difficult relationships with chaplaincies and/or student unions. It is also a substantial and persistent difference between UCCF and SCM (which is committed to ecumenism, including co-operation with CUs).

== Demographics and organisation ==
According to a 2013 research paper, there are approximately 200 UCCF-affiliated Christian Unions in the UK, with a total membership of around 10,000. UCCF members thus accounted for just over 1% of the total Christian student population in the UK (800,000). In the same survey, 10% of Christian students (over 82,000) reported engaging with Christian Union activities during term time.

UCCF employs about 80 staff, and has a further 80 or so volunteer "Relay Workers" on a one-year training programme. Many of these staff and volunteers are graduates who were involved in the CU as undergraduates. They support the student Christian Unions with training, advice and materials. According to a 2006 Ekklesia report, the majority (>65%) of UCCF's funding comes through donations by individuals. A further 10% of its funding is from donations by churches, while the rest is made up of contributions made by individual Christian Unions groups and support from charitable trusts.

== See also ==
- International Fellowship of Evangelical Students
- Inter-Varsity Press

Members

- Cambridge Inter-Collegiate Christian Union
- Oxford Inter-Collegiate Christian Union

International sister organisations

- InterVarsity Christian Fellowship (USA)
- Inter-Varsity Christian Fellowship of Canada
- Australian Fellowship of Evangelical Students
- Tertiary Students Christian Fellowship (New Zealand)

== Bibliography ==
- Douglas Johnson, Contending for the Faith – A History of the Evangelical Movement in the Universities and Colleges. ISBN 0-85110-591-2.
- Steve Bruce, The Student Christian Movement and the Inter-Varsity Fellowship: a sociological study of two student movements, (unpublished PhD thesis) – A copy is held at the British Library and also at the Center for Research Libraries, Chicago, IL 60637. An online PDF is also available.
- Lindsay Brown, Shining like Stars – stories from students worldwide. ISBN 1-84474-167-2
- Oliver Barclay & Robern Horn, From Cambridge to the World – history of Cambridge CU. ISBN 0-85111-499-7
- Bebbington, David W, Evangelicalism in Modern Britain: A History from the 1730s to the 1980s. London: Unwin Hyman, 1989. ISBN 0-04-941018-0
