= Inter-Varsity Press =

British Christian book publisher

- Country of origin: United Kingdom
- Headquarters location: London
- Key people: Sue Halliday, Chair of the Publishing Board Thomas Creedy, Editorial Director
- Publication types: Books, DVDs and other media
- Nonfiction topics: Bible commentaries, Christian life (evangelical), theology
- Imprints: Apollos, IVP, Keswick
- Revenue: £2,731,000
- No. of employees: c. 20
- Official website: www.ivpbooks.com

Inter-Varsity Press (IVP) was previously the publishing wing of Universities and Colleges Christian Fellowship. It supported the publishing or distribution of well over one million books each year to over 150 countries, including the translation of titles into over 90 different languages. Following a UCCF-wide strategic review in 2005, IVP was divested. It was intended that this would reduce the financial burden on UCCF. By 2015, IVP was nearly insolvent. The trustees transferred its assets and liabilities to religious publisher SPCK, with an agreement to use the imprint for evangelical Christian publishing.

== History ==
=== Foundation ===
In 1877, the Cambridge Inter-Collegiate Christian Union was created to encourage evangelical faith, and four years later, a sister organisation, the Oxford Inter-Collegiate Christian Union was founded. In 1919, members of these two unions gathered in London during an annual 'Inter-Varsity' sporting match. They decided to meet again and to encourage the formation of unions at other universities. By 1928, the Inter-Varsity Fellowship of Evangelical Unions was officially formed, consisting of 13 groups. Its first publication was a booklet entitled, IVF: A Brief History of the IVF. (At the time there was no such thing as IVF meaning In vitro fertilisation.)

=== The 20th century ===
The IVF began publishing Christian books in the 1930s (originally books were published under the name Inter-Varsity Fellowship – IVF). In 1936, the theologian Douglas Johnson, the general secretary of the Inter-Varsity Fellowship took on Ronald Inchley as the IVF's Publication Secretary. Ronald had freshly graduated from Birmingham University in 1936 and had no prior experience of publishing. He inherited a list of twenty titles, mostly booklets, which had already begun to appear. With Inchley's appointment came the opportunity to publish larger books such as T. C. Hammond's In Understanding Be Men.

Inchley was not immediately successful. In 1937, the IVF imprint made a significant financial loss, and in 1938 was nearly bankrupt. The Literary Committee considered appointing Hodder and Stoughton as official publishers to the IVF until a last minute decision was made to free Inchley from other duties so that he could focus more on publishing. Inchley remained in his post, apart from an interlude for war service, until 1976. He died on 13 April 2005 (aged 93).

Following the IVF's wartime closure, the press re-emerged and a steady growth ensued. Ruth Bolton was appointed as Editorial Assistant in 1948 and in 1949, the press appointed its first Sales Manager, Eddie Bradley-Feary. During the early years of IVF, books were distributed from the small wine cellar that lay below IVF's offices at 39 Bedford Square, London. Outgrowing this space, an empty water supply tank, built on a bombed site behind IVF's offices, became home to two new units. The early 1960s saw these temporary buildings pulled down and replaced by a four-storey office block and basement, used by IVF until it outgrew this space and transferred despatching opportunities to Scripture Union.

In 1968, the IVF was rebranded, resulting in the name Inter-Varsity Press which we know today.

In 1974, IVP resumed operations from its new warehouse and Book Centre in Nottingham.

In 1976, Inchley was succeeded as Publishing Director by the Revd Frank Entwistle, who had joined IVP in 1973 and remained there until his retirement in 2002. By this time, IVP was publishing seminal works such as The Bible Speaks Today expositions and the Tyndale Commentary series.

IVP had also moved again, with UCCF, to Leicester. The UCCF offices housed the IVP office staff for some 29 years. Throughout this time, IVP operated as a trading subsidiary of Inter-Varsity Fellowship Trust Limited.

=== The 21st century ===
Following a strategic review of UCCF in 2005, IVP was constituted as a separate Nottingham-based company and charity in its own right. This afforded IVP the organisational independence needed to increase its focus on developing its publishing ministry further.

The IVP team – office and operations – worked to fulfil this mission from the Book Centre in Nottingham.

In 2015 the press verged on insolvency and was taken over by SPCK. It is now a subsidiary charity of SPCK, although the entities remain distinct. The IVP imprint continues to publish and distribute Christian literature worldwide, with a distinct conservative evangelical ethos guaranteed by their continued adherence to the UCCF Doctrinal Basis. IVP continues to have its own editorial team and publishing board, thereby guaranteeing it maintains its "conservative evangelical brand" whilst benefiting from "SPCK's finance, IT and infrastructure".

== Imprints ==
- Apollos – academic titles, including the Apollos Old Testament Commentary, and the New Studies in Biblical Theology series, edited by D. A. Carson
- IVP – Christian living titles, discipleship resources, and commentaries in the Tyndale and Bible Speaks Today series.
- Keswick Ministries – Theme Books, Year Books (until 2020) and Study Guides, produced in a publishing partnership with the Keswick Convention.
