= Inter-Varsity Christian Fellowship of Canada =

Inter-Varsity Christian Fellowship of Canada (or simply InterVarsity) is an evangelical Christian student movement with affiliate groups on university campuses in Canada. It is a member of the International Fellowship of Evangelical Students.

Nigel Pollock is the current president. Prior to taking this role he spent 18 years with the University and Colleges Christian Fellowship in Scotland and for the past 10 years, the Tertiary Student Christian Fellowship in New Zealand. The organizational center is in Etobicoke, Ontario.

== History ==
In 1928 Norman Grubb reported to the Inter-Varsity Fellowship (IVF) in Britain of the spiritual decay happening at Canadian universities. In response, IVF sent Dr. Howard Guinness to Canada to help start evangelical student work at the universities. For fourteen months Guinness traveled across Canada, meeting with students at the universities and providing them with a model of daily prayer meet ups and weekly Bible study. Guinness also promoted training leaders in high schools and camps.

InterVarsity was officially organized in late 1929. In 1934 Stacey Woods became the new general secretary of InterVarsity in Canada and in 1938 he helped establish the first InterVarsity chapters in the United States.

Typically, InterVarsity meetings are composed of small groups of Christians meeting for weekly prayer and study. In the early 1990s, many groups experimented with additional large worship services in campus bars. This was the result of a large on campus evangelistic outreach that took place at McMaster university in 1991 featuring the British evangelist Michael Green and his team from Regent College in Vancouver. Originally the vision of Michael Hare who died in a car accident in January 1988, the mission featured a debate with the popular psychology professor Richard Day and a religious contemporary worship service in the campus bar, The Rat. Two more of these worship services were held under the leadership of Buff Cox, the InterVarsity staff worker, and Gregory Butler, the InterVarsity president at the time. In subsequent years, the worship services grew to attract hundreds of students at a time from all over Southern Ontario. The services moved to the larger bar, the Downstairs John, and became Church at the John. In subsequent years, the McMaster Chapter grew significantly and engaged in oversees missions, including a close connection to Lithuanian Christian University Students after the fall of the Iron Curtain.

== See also ==
- Campus Crusade for Christ
- Secular Student Alliance
