= International Fellowship of Evangelical Students =

International Fellowship of Evangelical Students (IFES)
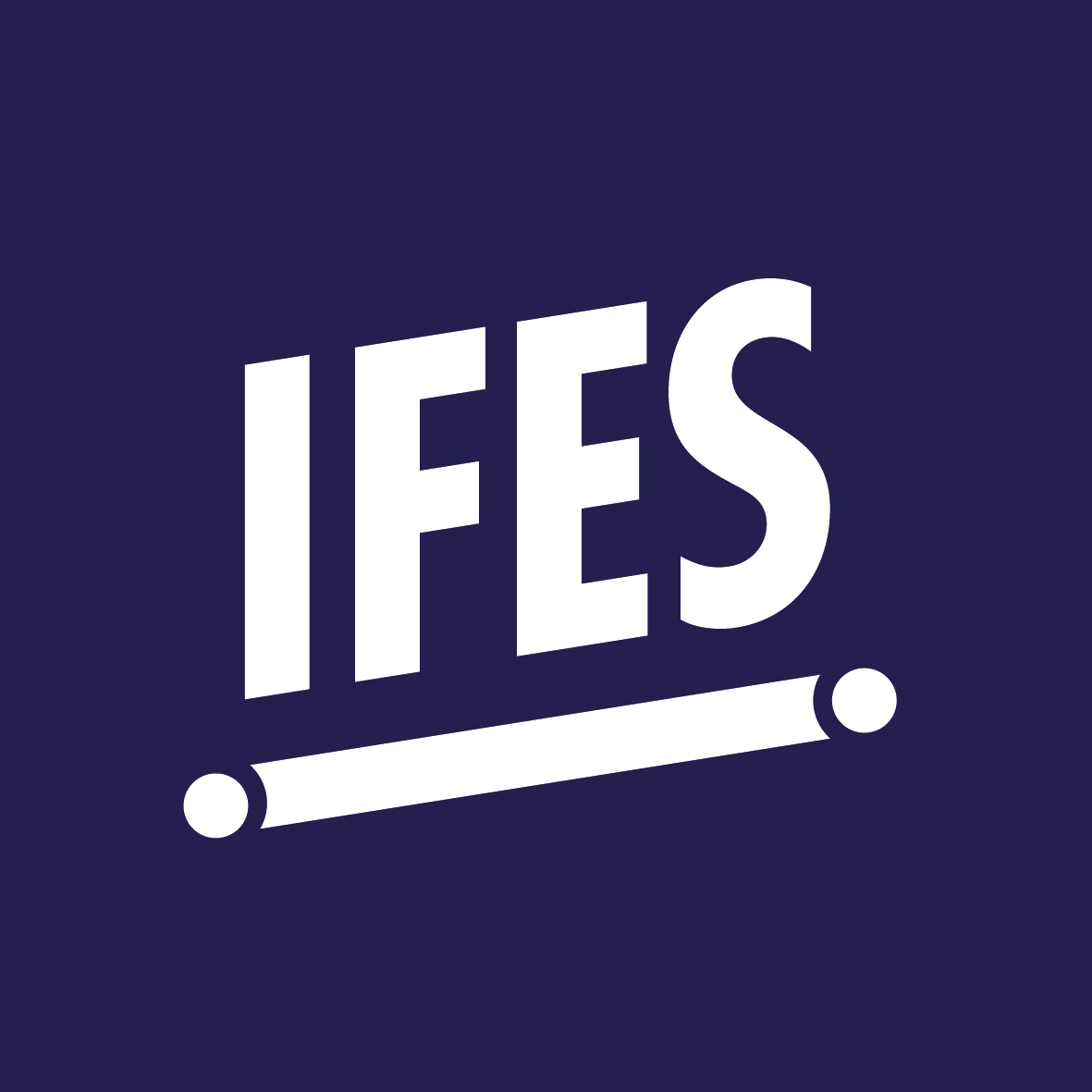
- Founded: 1947
- Type: Christian interdenominational student association
- Headquarters: Oxford, United Kingdom
- Region served: 180 countries
- General Secretary: Tim Adams, since 2021
- Website: ifesworld.org

The International Fellowship of Evangelical Students (IFES) is an interdenominational association of 180 evangelical Christian student movements worldwide, encouraging evangelism, discipleship and mission among students. The headquarters is in Oxford, England.

== History ==
In United Kingdom, the Oxford Inter-Collegiate Christian Union, founded in 1879, was a founding member of the Student Christian Movement of Great Britain (SCM) in 1892. Then in 1928, CICCU students left the SCM because of its ecumenical beliefs and its approval of new methods of biblical exegesis, and founded the Inter-Varsity Christian Fellowship. This movement was established in Canada in 1928, Australia in 1930, and in the United States in 1941.

In 1947, the International Fellowship of Evangelical Students was founded. Representatives from Australia, the United Kingdom, Canada, China, Netherlands, Norway, France, New Zealand, Switzerland, and the United States came together in Boston (USA) to strengthen evangelism, discipleship and world mission among students all over the world.

It was present in 180 countries in 2023.

== Programs ==
Group meetings are held each week to discuss the Bible in universities. These groups are Evangelical, but not attached to any particular confession. IFES faces a variety of challenges due to the different contexts in which it works with college students.

== Organization ==
Representatives of all the member movements gather once every four years at the "World Assembly", where the General Committee meets to conduct official business of the fellowship. IFES's General Secretaries have included:

- Stacey Woods (1947–1972)
- Chua Wee Hian (1972–1991)
- Lindsay Brown (1991–2007)
- Daniel Bourdanné (2007–2019)
- Jamil (acting, 2019–2020)
- Tim Adams (2021–present)

== Publishing houses ==
Christian literature distribution is also a feature of this ministry. InterVarsity Press (USA), Inter-Varsity Press (UK), Presses Bibliques Africaines (Francophone Africa), Harmat (Hungary), Andamio (Spain), and Ediciones Certeza (Latin America) are examples of regional publishing houses.

=== Partnerships ===
Tyndale is a Christian publishing house, publishing Christian fiction, nonfiction, children’s books amongst others. Tyndale has supported IFES since 1967, through Tyndale House Foundation and helps establish IFES-affiliated publishing programs in other countries including Pakistan, Malaysia, Hong Kong, the Philippines, Brazil, Uganda, India and the United States. These programs enable students to write and publish their own brochures, books and curriculums, and to serve their local campuses.

== See also ==
- Cru Christian campus ministry
- Passion Conferences Founded by Louie Giglio to provide annual gathering of Christian students
- World Student Christian Federation
- Lausanne Movement, to which many IFES members have contributed
- Langham Partnership, to which many IFES members have contributed
- UCCF (formerly IVF)
- InterVarsity Christian Fellowship/USA

== Bibliography ==
- Douglas Johnson, A Brief History of the International Fellowship Of Evangelical Students, Lausanne, Switzerland, IFES, 1964.
- Pete Lowman, The Day of His Power, Leicester, Inter-Varsity, 1988. ISBN 0-85110-794-X
- Alice Poynor, From the Campus to the World: Stories from the First Fifty Years of Student Foreign Missions Fellowship, InterVarsity Press, 1986. ISBN 0-87784-947-1
- David M. Howard, Student Power in World Missions, InterVarsity Press, 1979. ISBN 0-87784-493-3 (Brief history of North American students in mission beginning with the Haystack Movement through the SVM to the SFMF.)
- C. Stacey Woods, The Growth of a Work of God, InterVarsity Press, 1978. ISBN 0-87784-741-X (Early history of InterVarsity/USA)
- Keith & Gladys Hunt, For Christ and the University: The Story of InterVarsity Christian Fellowship of the U.S.A./ 1940-1990, InterVarsity Press, 1991. ISBN 0-8308-4996-3
- Lindsay Brown, Shining Like Stars - the Power of the Gospel in the World’s Universities, Inter-Varsity Press, 2006. ISBN 1-84474-167-2 (Spanish translation: Brillando Como Estrellas, Andamio. ISBN 84-96551-28-8, ISBN 978-84-96551-28-2
- A. Donald Macleod, C. Stacey Woods and the Evangelical Rediscovery of the University, Downers Grove: InterVarsity Press, 2007. ISBN 978-0-8308-3432-7
- Luke Cawley, "Campus Lights: Students Living and Speaking for Jesus Around the World", Edinburgh: Muddy Pearl, 2019. ISBN 978-1-910012-73-4
