= Bishopscourt, Darling Point =

Heritage listed site in Sydney, New South Wales, Australia

Bishopscourt
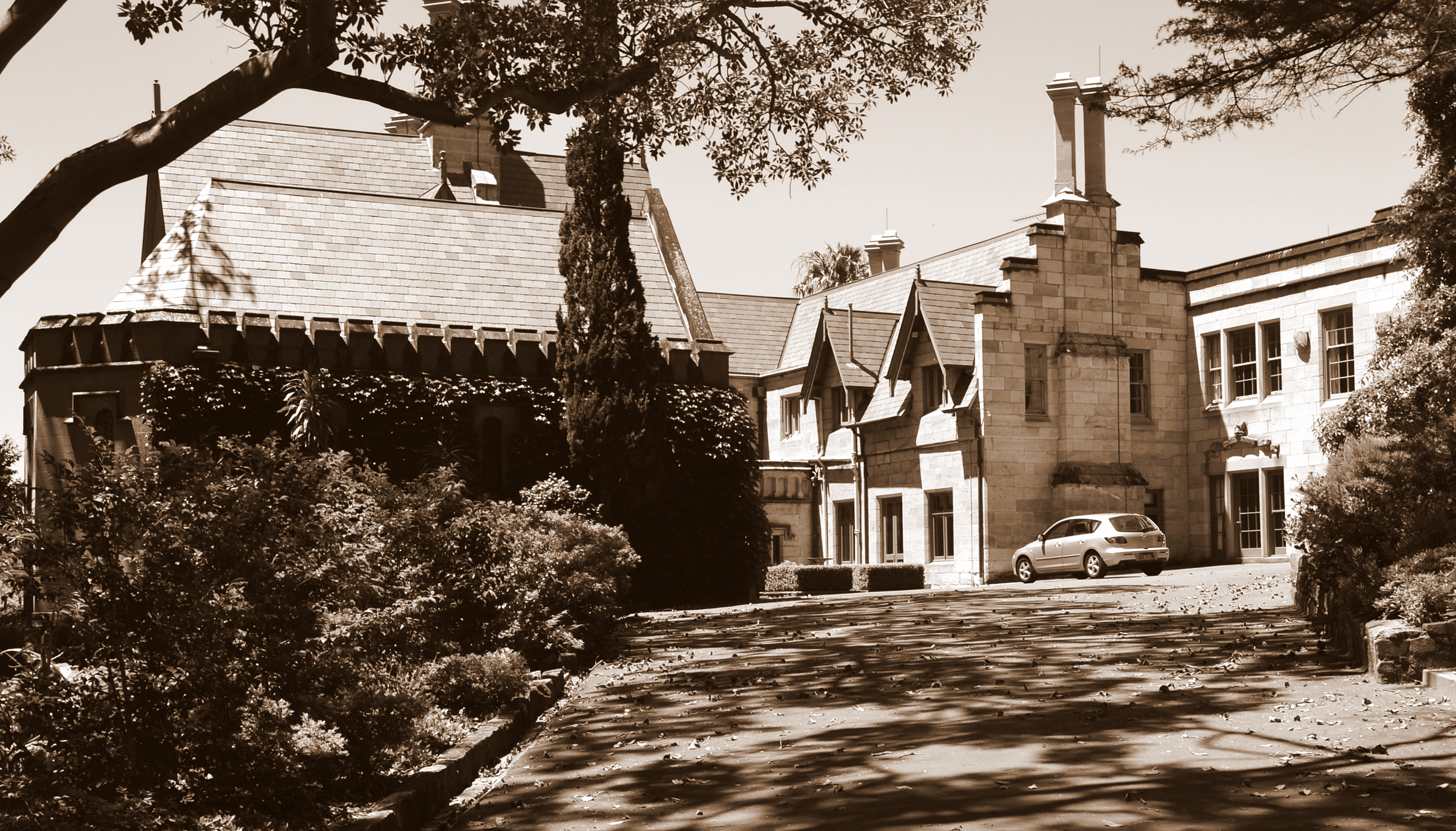

- Location within east Sydney
- Former names: Greenoaks

General information
- Status: Completed
- Architectural style: Victorian Gothic Revival
- Location: 11A Greenoaks Avenue, Darling Point, Sydney, Australia
- Coordinates: 33°52′34″S 151°14′17″E
- Construction started: 1846
- Completed: 1849
- Client: Thomas Sutcliffe Mort

Design and construction
- Architects: John Frederick Hilly (1846); Edmund Blacket (1859); Leslie Wilkinson (1935)

New South Wales Heritage Register
- Official name: Bishopscourt; Greenoaks
- Type: State heritage (complex / group)
- Designated: 2 April 1999
- Reference no.: 000362
- Type: Garden Residential
- Category: Parks, Gardens and Trees
- Builders: Thomas Woolley (1841); Thomas Sutcliffe Mort

Bishopscourt, Darling Point is a heritage-listed residence and former archbishop's residence at 11A Greenoaks Avenue, Darling Point, Sydney, Australia. It was designed by J. F. Hilly (1846), Edmund Blacket (1859) and Leslie Wilkinson (1935) and built from 1846 to 1849 by Thomas Woolley (1841); Thomas Sutcliffe Mort. It is also known as Bishopscourt and Greenoaks. Up until December 2015, the property was owned by the Anglican Diocese of Sydney; and is now privately owned. The property was added to the New South Wales State Heritage Register on 2 April 1999.

== History ==
=== Colonial history ===
Originally known by its Aboriginal name Yarranabbee, Darling Point was called Mrs Darling's Point by Ralph Darling (1825–31 Governor) in honour of his wife. At that time the area was open forest, but after New South Head Road was built in 1831 timber cutters felled most of the trees, and the land was subdivided. Most of the plots, covering 3.6 to 6.1 hectares (9 to 15 acres) in this area, were taken up between 1833 and 1838. The suburb became known as Darling Point.

Several notable people bought land and built homes here, including surveyor-general Sir Thomas Mitchell's Carthona and one-time home Lindesay. Around the middle of the 1800s residents included the Reverend George Fairfowl Macarthur, one time rector at St Mark's Church, Darling Point, members of the Tooth family, brewers, at Swifts, and Samuel Hordern, retail king.

=== Percyville, later Greenoaks ===
The land (of what became Percyville/Greenoaks/Bishopscourt) (then allotment 11) was purchased by Elizabeth Pike and Thomas Smith (Elizabeth Pike's "grant" passed to Richard Jones and Joseph Hyde Potts in between June 1835 and July 1836. By 1835–36 a small residence was built by Richard Jones – presumably s three roomed single storey cottage with an entrance porch. c. 1840 the house was extended – presumably made two storeys – its architect is unknown. A window was removed from the west facade space G11 and an oriel window was installed.

By 1841, a portion of Jones & Potts' land and of Smith's grant (making up 4.5 hectares (11 acres)) was purchased by Thomas Woolley, ironmonger, who built a two-storey stone cottage "Percyville" on the site with John Frederick Hilly as architect. Most of the front of the present house is this original Percyville design.

Originally known as Greenoaks, Bishopscourt was designed by Edmund Blacket. A cottage originally occupied the site, and the owner, Thomas Sutcliffe Mort, built the sandstone Gothic Revival mansion around this building, circa 1850–1860. Further extensions were made in 1935 after being designed by Leslie Wilkinson. The exterior features Tudor windows and carved doors and crests. The interior was based on the Palace of Westminster and is considered to be an outstanding example of Blacket's work, with stained-glass windows, tiled floors, an elaborate staircase and panelled library.

==== Thomas Sutcliffe Mort ====
In 1845 Thomas Sutcliffe Mort leased the land, purchasing it in 1846 for A£2,500, and then in the late 1850s/60s commenced work on a house he called Greenoaks. c. 1853–55 alterations were made by architect J. F. Hilly and Mr Page was the builder. These included stables, bays to the morning room (G11), the drawing room (G9), a staircase (the position of Hilly's staircase is uncertain – it may have been in rooms G6 and F11). The position of a label mould indicates an early stair in that area but its date and origin are unclear), stained glass windows to the stairhall and old study (G14 and G13), and an extension to the south (G5, G4B). In 1853 Hilly called for tenders for a new stables and coach house for premises at Darling Point. Stained glass for Greenoakes was ordered from Hardman's of Birmingham. A further tender notice by Hill which may relate to Greenoaks (11/7/1854) was for "additions to residence, Darling Point". Tender notice for plasterers of January 1855 may relate to Greenoakes. An estimate for papier mache or carton pierre celining ornament was received (12/1858) from George Jackson & Son of London.

Mort, businessman and horticulturist, was born in Bolton, England and worked as a clerk, seizing the chance to migrate to Sydney in 1838 to bolster the family fortunes. In 1843 he set up as an auctioneer, becoming an innovator in wool sales. His pastoral interests included Franklyn Vale, in the Darling Downs, Queensland and Bodalla at the mouth of the Tuross River, South Coast, NSW. By the end of the 1840s his fortune was made, but he restlessly pursued other projects, some ill-starred. In 1841 he married Therese, daughter of Commissary-General James Laidley. Mort pioneered weekly wool auctions and the refrigeration of food, was involved in moves for the first railway in NSW, and was a founder of the AMP Society. He was instrumental in construction of Mort's Dock at Balmain in 1854, which gave Sydney a dry dock for repairing ships.

His wealth facilitated his considerable horticultural ambitions. Greenoaks, his Darling Point property, set the tone among fashionable villas of this choice Sydney resort. Mort used architect F. J. Hilly who transformed the original cottage Percyville (which stood in more than 2.8 hectares (7 acres) of ground) into a two storied Gothic Revival gentleman's residence. Mort renamed it Greenoaks and also transformed its grounds from 1846.

Mort enjoyed his wealth and it gave rein to a natural flamboyance which, often hidden in his personal dealings, was epitomized in his house where it flowered in Academic Gothic Revival extravagances. In his 1857–59 visit to England he attended a sale at the earl of Shrewsbury's Alton Towers. Among other acquisitions were Elizabethan armour, old English coats of mail, a cabinet that had belonged to Marie Antoinette, antique oak furniture and about 120 pictures. On his return he engaged architect Edmund Blacket to make additions to the house (including a covered carriageway, stables and kitchens) and an art gallery which, with his gardens, were open to the public. 1860 additions and alterations were made by Blacket to the southern wing (possibly incorporating the ground floor kitchen and including construction of a southern basement), a picture gallery (single storey), nursery, second entrance and porte cochere, some applied decoration and embellishment to existing interiors and a new staircase and stair hall.

A keen gardener, Mort won many prizes at the flower shows in the 1840s and 1850s. In 1851 he served on the committee of management of the Australasian Botanical and Horticultural Society and in the 1870s became president of the Horticultural Society of New South Wales. He was also a vice-president of the Agricultural Society in 1861–78. He was a commissioner for the 1873 London International Exhibition and in 1876 for the Philadelphia and Melbourne International Exhibitions.

At meetings of the Australasian Botanic and Horticultural Society in Sydney Mort first met newly arrived Irish-English nurseryman and landscape designer Michael Guilfoyle. Greatly impressed with his knowledge and experience and having heard something of the prowess of the Guilfoyle family in England in such matters, he commissioned him to develop and landscape Greenoaks. The success of this, which occupied Guilfoyle for a period of some 12 months, together with the considerable influence that Mort exerted in the community, ensured that the future of Michael Guilfoyle in the field of landscape design and nursery practice was assured. The garden became famous in its time and was regarded as one of the finest in Sydney.

Mort and Guilfoyle created a celebrated landscape garden from 1849. Guilfoyle used the steep sloping site to provide a wild, romantic setting for the medieval mansion, and a wide variety of plants to provide botanical and visual interest, most likely supplied from his "Exotic Nursery" in Double Bay, which adjoined Greenoaks to the south.

When the Duke of Edinburgh first visited Sydney in 1853, he made a special journey "along New South Head Road to visit Mr Mort's garden, and there tasted a rare date plum (probably a Diospyros lotus, date plum from America), grown only by Mr Guilfoyle."

==== Michael Guilfoyle ====
Michael Guilfoyle (c. 1809–1884), nursery proprietor and landscape gardener, received his early training in London and rose to the position of foreman at the Royal Exotic Nursery, King's Road, Chelsea. This nursery, established in 1808 by Joseph Knight (and later owned by the famous Veitch family of nurserymen) specialised in greenhouse and stove plants. Knight had such faith in Guilfoyle's abilities that he sent him to many parts of the Kingdom to lay out or remodel parks and gardens frequently without even inspecting his work. In 1849 Guilfoyle and his family emigrated to Sydney, and established a nursery in Kellick Street, Redfern, which soon failed. He then gained the patronage of T. S. Mort.

Greenoaks grounds became the "leading and model private garden of NSW", described at length in the "Horticultural Magazine" 1865. As noted above, Mort was president of the Horticultural Society of NSW, publisher of the magazine, and Guilfoyle was listed in it as one of the "good and first rate gardeners" formerly employed at Greenoaks.

Mort owned land down the hill from Greenoaks, in Double Bay, where he had his vegetable garden, and offices and Guilfoyle occupied a cottage there (at the corner of South and Ocean Streets). By 1851 Guilfoyle had established a nursery on 1.4 hectares (3.5 acres) of land belonging to Mort. He developed this site until 1875, still leasing it from Mort. In this nursery Guilfoyle stocked flowering and evergreen trees and a wide selection of conifers, "probably one of the most complete in the colony" (journal entry by exteemed visiting English nurseryman John Gould Veitch in 1864). His 1862 catalogue listed 2,500 plants. This nursery was described by esteemed English nurseryman Veitch in 1864, as "if not the largest, one of the best nurseries in the colony." Veitch describes in the same journal entry, Mr Mort's garden of Darling Point as one of "few private gardens in Sydney where gardening is carried on with any spirit. Those of Mr Thomas Mort, of Darling Point, the late Mr William Macleay of Elizabeth Bay and Sir Daniel Cooper of Rose Bay, formerly contained good collections of native and imported plants, but now they are no longer kept up".

Guilfoyle overcame the difficulty in propagating jacarandas (J.mimosifolia) in 1868, enabling the widespread use of this spectacular flowering tree for the first time. He raised new varieties of popular plants such as verbena, camellia, and azalea, and attempted to popularise both in Australia and Britain the plants introduced from the Pacific Islands by Charles Moore, then-Director of the Sydney Botanic Gardens, and his son William Robert Guilfoyle, on a voyage of 1868. He is known to have sought two cases of Norfolk Island pine (Araucaria heterophylla) from Charles Moore in 1855, (which may have been the source of the specimen depicted in an 1857 engraving of Greenoaks).

In 1860 Mort acquired the Bodalla estate on the South Coast of NSW, where his gardener Michael Bell took up farm management, replaced at Greenoaks by George Mortimore. Both gardeners, like Guilfoyle and Mort, were active members of the Horticultural Society of NSW; Mort became its respected president in the 1862 Morris, 2002). He maintained his enthusiasm for horticulture over 30 years, first as an exhibitor and top prize winner in the Horticultural Society's shows, and later as an administrator. He retained the position of President until 1878 and pursued hybridisation of cacti in Sydney's premier garden. An 1857 engraving of Greenoaks shows the generous expanse of the pleasure garden at one of Sydney's most celebrated villa gardens, and indicates prickly pear bushes (Opuntia spp.) in the foreground, dense shrubberies and trees, and an emergent Norfolk Island pine (Araucaria heterophylla) near the house.

Greenoaks Cottage (now at 3a Greenoaks Avenue) is a substantial Gothic Revival house built in the late 1860s by Mort intending to move into it while leasing Greenoaks.

A strong high churchman, Mort was one of the most prominent Anglican laymen in Sydney. He gave the land for St Mark's Church, Darling Point, commissioned Edmund Blacket to design it and contributed generously to its building and upkeep as well as to the building of St Andrew's Cathedral and St Paul's College, University of Sydney. He was a founding fellow of the college and a warden of St Mark's. He was also the founder of Christ Church School in Pitt Street and a friend of Bishop Patteson.

Mort's wife Therese died in 1869. Tumbling wool prices forced him to mortgage Greenoaks. However following Theresa's death in 1869 from cancer, he did not make the move. In the front garden of 2D Greenoaks Avenue, next door, is the replica statue of "The Dying Gladiator", which once graced the garden of Greenoaks. In 1874 he married Marianne Elizabeth Macauley, who ran the St. Mark's Crescent School. Mort died in 1878 at Bodalla but his second wife lived at Greenoaks until 1892. The trustees of his will agreed to sell the property to a grazier, Michael Campbell Langtree, who then subdivided the estate. A statue to Mort was erected in Macquarie Place in 1883. The Governor's unveiling of the statue was witnessed by hundreds of workers who had voluntarily forfeited a day's pay in order that they might be present for this final tribute to their late employer. The house was let to various tenants until 1910. It was offered for sale at public auction on 5 July 1910 by Richardson & Wrench and passed in, failing to meet its reserve.

=== Anglican Church ===
Campbell Langtree agreed to subdivide and sell part of Greenoaks to the Church of England (for A£6,750 in 1910 as a residence for the Archbishop of Sydney. Then Archbishop John Wright found his Randwick residence "too far from the centre of things to be a city dwelling and not far enough out to be a country retreat". The house was renamed Bishopscourt and was dedicated as the home of the Anglican Archbishop of Sydney on 24 October 1910.

In 1910 Greenoakes Avenue was partly constructed. On 6 & 7 December 1910 the contents of the house were sold at auction. On 8 December 1910 Greenoakes was conveyed by Mort's Trustees to Langtree for A£15,000 and part by him to the Church of England on the same day for A£6,750. The major subdivision of the property (the residue of Mort's estate), when Greenoaks Avenue was put through, took place in 1911. The subdivision and sale was at auction on the proviso: "Any building erected on the land must be of brick or stone with roof of slates, tiles or shingles and most cost and be of a value of not less than A£750".

A service of dedication was held for Bishopscourt on 26 August 1911. From 1911 until 2015 it was the residence of eight Anglican Archbishops including Sir Marcus Loane, Donald Robinson, Harry Goodhew, Peter Jensen and Glenn Davies: who was resident while the building was sold. It is regarded as the finest Gothic Revival residence in New South Wales. Between 1911 and 1913 renovations were undertaken for the church by architect, J. Burcham Clamp, replacing shingle roof with slates, installing electricity, new water and sewer servies, fixing and supplying outside Venetian blinds, fences to boundary lines, entrance gates, stone steps to the lawn, erection of a tennis screen, repairs to the tank over the main laundry, erection of a summer house on the western boundary, converting the small chapel into a library, removing the kitchen (basement to ground floor level), erecting balconies, probably over the northern verandah, removed in 1927), partial subdivision of the picture gallery, construction of a small bathroom extension (G1), replacing some window sashes, general repairs – some internal rearrangement of the Blacket wing, new window to the library. The contractors were Messrs Robert Watt & Sons with the grounds, gates and walls done by Mr Neal.

In 1927 additions and alterations designed by H. E. Ross & Rowe were approved (11/7/1927) for the removal of the timber stair and further subdivision of the picture gallery (a new concrete stair), a new kitchen at ground floor, new stone balcony to the north, alteration of the first floor accommodation, alteration to windows in the kitchen and servery. The southern block was divided into two parts, offered for sale to fund alterations but due to problems of land access the land was withdrawn from sale on 20/10/1927 having failed to reach its anticipated price. In 1935 a chapel was constructed on the western facade by R. H. Ross & Rowe (supervising architect: R.Lindsay Little), the oriel window was partially removed at this time. The house was later (1935) remodelled and extended at a cost of £10,000 by Prof. Leslie Wilkinson, head of the Architecture Faculty at Sydney University. Wilkinson had a marked effect on Sydney's architecture and built over 50 houses in the eastern suburbs.

c. 1940 a brick enclosure was built in the basement (B4) and a back screen to the door for use as an air raid shelter. Further alterations and additions were made in 1959 by R. Lindsay Little: work on the drainage system, retaining walls, redecoration of the interior (including removal of some original decorative elements in the drawing room and stair hall), a new hot water system, alterations to cloak room and toilet facilities and removal of outdoor fencing. Further alterations and additions were made in 1965 by Fowell Mansfield Maclurcan in conjunction with Professor Wilkinson: removal of the Blacket Porte Cochere and first floor servant accommodation and construction of private accommodation for the archbishop, extensive garden remodelling, further subdivision to the nursery to provide separate accommodation, shortening of the stables and coach house, and relocation of windows.

Nurseryman and garden designer Claude Crowe (of Berrima Bridge Nurseries) worked on numerous gardens allied to different churches, including Bishopscourt. The church contemplated selling Bishopscourt in 1963, 1982, 1991 and most recently in 2001. A subdivision off Bishopscourt's southern side was approved in 1990 and since then multi-storey terraced apartments have been built in the early 2000s in some proximity to Bishopscourt's southern side. The property still displays prominently some of the larger trees of the original Guilfoyle planting.

In 1985 an interim conservation order (no. 445) was gazetted over the property. In 1990 the site was subdivided. In 2006 tree pruning, removal of selected trees and adaptation of the external drainage system was undertaken. In 2007 a master plan was prepared for the grounds and garden by David Beaver, landscape architect and heritage consultant. In 2009 conservation of the slate roof, installation of copper roof, conservation of sandstone chimneys was done. In 2010 refurbishment of a shower room in the first floor of the stables building was undertaken.

=== Private ownership ===
The church's governing body ended decades of debate by voting to sell the 6,216-square-metre (66,910 sq ft) property in 2012. The estate was listed on the real estate market and sold in December 2015, ending 105 years of ownership by the Anglican Church. A local buyer exchanged on $18 million for the residence. The 6,216-square-metre (66,910 sq ft) estate was sold by Ray White Double Bay agent Craig Pontey. "Several million dollars would be required in the near future for renovations and as the agreed price is at the upper end of valuations, the Trust acted prudently to conclude a sale," said the chairman of the Anglican Property Trust, Dr Robert Tong. Buyer feedback has reportedly factored in costs to refurbish the property of more than $10 million. The sale returns to private hands one of the great heritage estates of the eastern suburbs, comparable to the nearby, much larger Swifts mansion which was formerly home to the Catholic Archbishop before it was bought by the Moran family. The Anglican church made the decision to sell Bishopscourt at the 2012 Synod, with 452 votes out of 579 in favour, with a five-year window in which to sell the property. Former archbishop Peter Jensen vacated it when he retired in July 2013, and it was formally listed to expressions of interest two months later; however, his successor Glenn Davies moved back in during 2014 after the property originally failed to sell. Original hopes of $25 million were revised down after it went to auction in March 2015, at which it was passed in after interest by local buyers stalled at the $20 million level.

The church sold the property in December 2015 for A$18 million. Chinese billionaire Wang Qinghui took possession. Wang debuted on the Forbes Rich List of China in 2014 as a result of his early investment in the Beijing Zinwei Telecom Technology Group. This company was designated by five central government ministries to be a key software enterprise for state planning. In 2019 it was reported that Wang had on-sold the property to his teenage son Caleb.

== Fire ==
Fire broke out in Bishopscourt in January 2019. Fire crews attended and managed to control the fire, preventing extensive damage. The fire was believed to have spread from a fireplace.

== Description ==
Developing the site from 1846, Mort built a mansion designed by F. J. Hilly with later additions by Edmund Blacket in academic gothic style. It is a very fine domestic Gothic house built 1850s around an already existing cottage considerably enlarged by Hilly, Blacket and others, and features:

- dressed sandstone with steep pitched slate roof, projecting attics, interesting stepped gable topped by two freestanding chimneys
- windows and doors finely carved in Victorian Tudor design,
- porte cochere in form of Gothic chapel added by Blacket in 1860.
- grand stair hall with stained glass window
- elaborate ceilings
- fine Gothic fireplaces

The coat of arms of the Mort family are carved on the sandstone walls. Mort had a private gallery which had 200 works of art, suits of English armour, and war weapons collected on a trip to England. The gallery, one of several private galleries in colonial NSW, was opened to the public once a month. The garden was said to be one of the finest in Sydney.

Greenoaks set the tone among the fashionable villas of this choice Sydney resort. Mort employed the newly arrived landscape designer and nurseryman Michael Guilfoyle, and created a celebrated landscape garden from 1849. Guilfoyle used the steep sloping site to provide a wild, romantic setting for the medieval mansion, and a wide variety of plants to provide botanical and visual interest, most likely supplied from his "Exotic Nursery" in Double Bay, which adjoined Greenoaks to the south. Mort pursued hybridisation of cacti in Sydney's premier garden. An 1857 engraving of Greenoaks shows the generous expanse of the pleasure garden at one of Sydney's most celebrated villa gardens, and indicates prickly pear bushes (Opuntia spp.) in the foreground, dense shrubberies and trees, and an emergent Norfolk Island pine (Araucaria heterophylla) near the house.

A number of specimen trees and shrubs have been planted by Archbishops and their wives over the years, presented as gifts etc. Coral trees (Erythrina sp.) on eastern side/bank near house were supposedly planted by one of the then Archbishop's sons, c.1950s.

The house, from Greenoaks Avenue, is still shrouded by trees and there is wild growth among the coral trees and Moreton Bay figs. Golden nasturtiums tumble over the paling fence set on the surrounding stone wall. There is a huge Moreton Bay fig (Ficus macrophylla) with sculptural roots stretching to the earth.

=== Modifications and dates ===
The following modifications to the property were made:

- 1841 – a holding of 4.5 hectares (11 acres) purchased by Thomas Woolley, who built a two-storey stone cottage Percyville. Most of the front of the present house is the original design.
- 1845 – Thomas Sutcliffe Mort leased the land, purchasing 2.8 hectares (7 acres) in 1846 and then in the late 1850s–60s commenced work on transforming the original cottage into a two storied Gothic Revival gentleman's residence.
- Later – additions were made by architect Edmund Blacket to include a covered carriageway, stables, and kitchens.
- 1849 – Michael Guilfoyle commenced to create a celebrated landscape garden at Greenoaks.
- 1892 – sold to a grazier, Michael Campbell Langtree, who then subdivided the estate. Later Langtree agreed to sell part of Greenoaks to the Church of England. The house was renamed Bishopscourt and dedicated as the home of the Anglican Archbishop in 1910. The house was let to various tenants until 1910.
- 1911 – major subdivision of the property, when Greenoaks Avenue was put through
- 1935 – Professor Leslie Wilkinson designed a western two storey wing with garages below
- c. 2006 – NSW Land & Environment Court approved construction of ten penthouse style apartments on a subdivision of Bishopscourt directly south of the mansion, fronting Greenoaks Avenue (7/17 Greenoaks Avenue). Stepped up slope, with extensive basement car parking, requiring deep excavation.
- 2009 – Three Coral trees & European olives removed on eastern side: replaced with three Illawarra flame trees and underplanting per Beaver CMP.

=== Further information ===
Coral trees (Erythrina sp.) on eastern side/bank near house were supposedly planted by one of the Archbishop's sons, c.1950s.

== Heritage listing ==
As of 3 June 2016, the site comprises the 2.8-hectare (6.9-acre) historic core of a villa estate featuring a mansion and grounds built for businessman and horticulturist Thomas Sutcliffe Mort. Mort was involved in establishing weekly wool auctions, early food refrigeration, and the initial New South Wales railway proposals, as well as co-founding the AMP Society. In 1854, he established Mort's Dock at Balmain, providing Sydney with a dry dock facility for ship repairs.

Mort was friend and patron of Edmund Blacket, in the late nineteenth century Sydney's leading architect, and Blacket designed what is probably the best Gothic picturesque house in New South Wales.

Greenoaks retains the core of a once celebrated landscape garden created by Mort and nurseryman and landscape designer Michael Guilfoyle from 1849, which in its heyday became the "leading and model private garden of NSW", and set the tone in this fashionable Sydney resort. The grounds use the steep sloping site to provide a wild, romantic setting for the medieval mansion. A wide variety of plants were used to provide botanical and visual interest, some of which remain today. ort built a mansion designed by Edmund Blacket in academic gothic style. Guilfoyle used the steep sloping site to provide a wild, romantic setting for the medieval mansion, and a wide variety of plants to provide botanical and visual interest, most likely supplied from his "Exotic Nursery" in Double Bay, which adjoined Greenoaks to the south.

Since 1911 the renamed Bishopscourt has been the home of Sydney's Anglican Archbishops.

The then 4.5-hectare (11-acre) estate and part of the mansion also have associations with Thomas Woolley, a Sydney ironmonger, who built a two-storey stone cottage "Percyville" on the site with J. F. Hilly as architect. Most of the front of the present house is the original design.

The property also has associations with architect Professor Leslie Wilkinson who designed extensive remodelling including an extension over the former stables in 1935. Wilkinson was head of the Architecture Faculty at Sydney University and had a marked effect on Sydney's architecture building over 50 houses in the eastern suburbs.

Bishopscourt, Darling Point was listed on the New South Wales State Heritage Register on 2 April 1999.

== See also ==
- Australian residential architectural styles
