= Broughton Knox =

Australian academic

David Broughton Knox (26 December 1916 – 14 January 1994) was principal of Moore Theological College from 1959 until 1985; and considered by some as the "Father of Contemporary Sydney Anglicanism".

Knox was born in Adelaide and educated at Knox Grammar School and the University of Sydney. He was ordained deacon in 1941 and priest in 1942. After two years as a curate in Cambridge in England he was a RNVR chaplain during World War II. He began his long association with Moore Theological College in 1947.

In 1986, a Festschrift was published in his honour. God who is Rich in Mercy: Essays presented to Dr. D. B. Knox included contributions from Donald W. B. Robinson, James I. Packer, Graeme Goldsworthy, Francis I. Andersen, Paul W. Barnett, Leon Morris, William J. Dumbrell, F. F. Bruce, Peter T. O'Brien, David G. Peterson, Marcus Loane, Klaas Runia, Peter F. Jensen, and Geoffrey W. Bromiley.

Muriel Porter suggests that Knox's appointment as principal was "one of the most important events for the shaping of the Sydney Diocese as it is today", particularly in the way Knox's theology emphasised propositional revelation and his ecclesiology emphasised the local church.

Academic offices
Preceded by Marcus Loane	Principal of Moore Theological College; 1959–1985	Succeeded by Peter Jensen
