= St Mark's Church, Darling Point =

St Mark's Church
- St Mark's Church, Darling Point
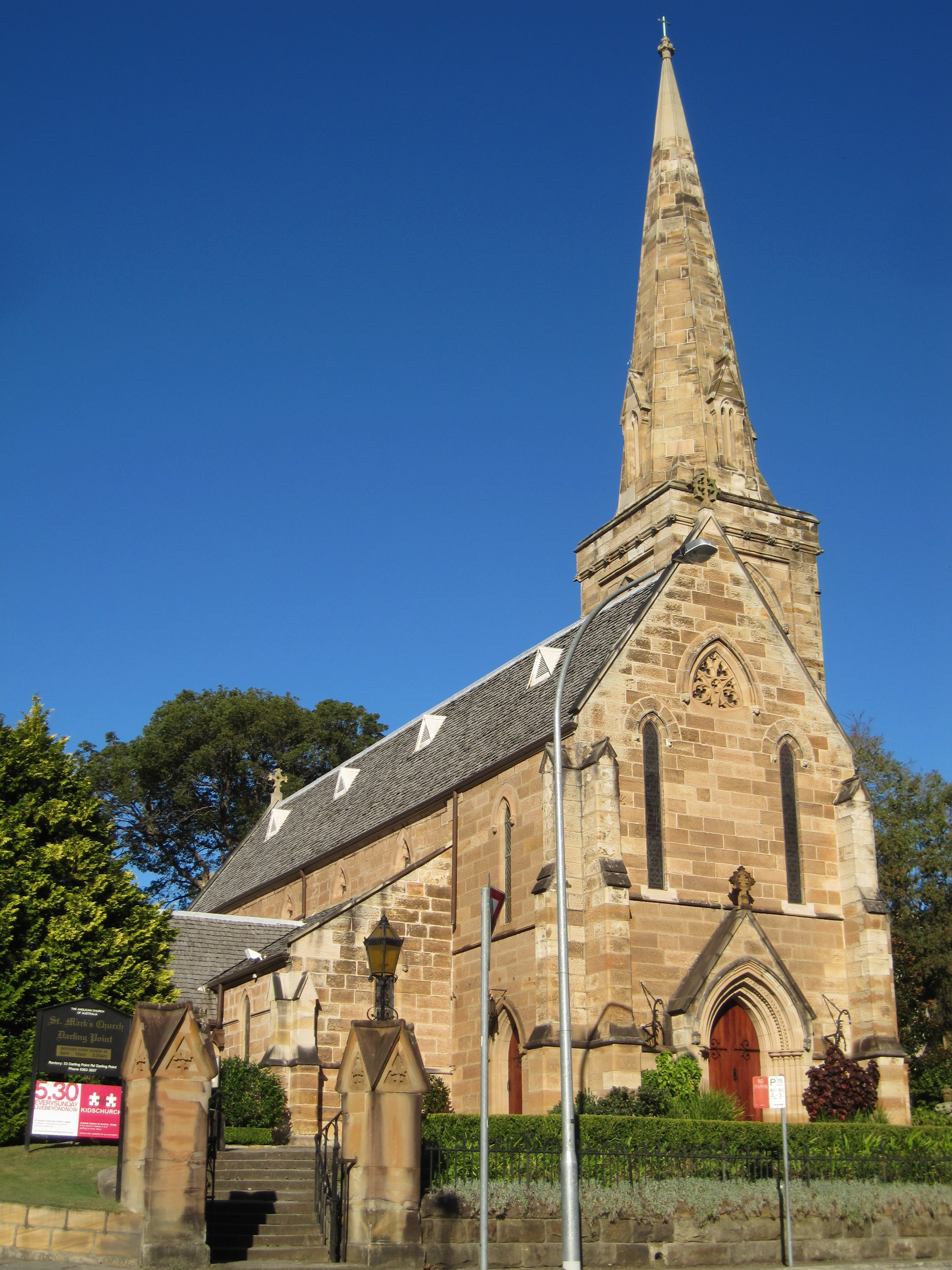

- Location in Greater Sydney
- 33°52′33″S 151°14′09″E
- Location: Darling Point Road, Darling Point, Sydney, New South Wales
- Country: Australia
- Denomination: Anglican Church of Australia
- Website: stmarksdp.org

History
- Status: Church
- Founded: 1848
- Founder: Thomas Sutcliffe Mort

Architecture
- Functional status: Active
- Architect: Edmund Blacket
- Architectural type: Academic Gothic Revival
- Completed: 1854; 1861; 1864

Administration
- Diocese: Sydney

Clergy
- Rector: Michael Jensen

New South Wales Heritage Register
- Official name: St Marks Anglican church; Rectory of St Marks church; St Marks Cottage
- Type: Built
- Criteria: b., d.
- Designated: 23 January 2006

St Mark's Church is an active Anglican church in Darling Point, a suburb of Sydney, New South Wales, Australia. It is part of a significant local heritage group that includes the church, rectory, and adjacent cottage. The group forms part of a large collection of important to late 19th century buildings of considerable townscape, historic and cultural significance, including the former St Mark's Crescent School, St Mark's Cottage and Bishopscourt, formerly Greenoaks.

== History ==
Constructed between 1848 and 1880, St Mark's Church was designed by Colonial Architect to New South Wales, Edmund Blacket, in an early Victorian Rustic Gothic Revival style with nave, chancel, vestries, organ chamber, tower and spire; made of Sydney sandstone with hardwood timber shingled roofs. The church was completed in 1854 with the spire, a gift from William Laidley, added later. In 1861 the church was extended to the west to include the porch and gallery. Prior to completion of this building, accommodation for worshippers in this section of the parish of Alexandria was provided by Thomas Ware Smart of Mona, who converted one of his cottages in Mona Lane in the Chapel of St Mark. In 1863 Wolliam Bradley of Lindesay built at his expense, the present vestries.

St Mark's Church is one of the best known Anglican parish churches in Australia and has become a popular wedding venue hosting such famous weddings as Elton John's first marriage and the fictional wedding in the film Muriel's Wedding. Social photographer Sam Hood captured many socialite weddings during the 1930s.

== Leadership ==
Established under the patronage of Bishop William Grant Broughton, the inaugural incumbent at St Marks' was the Reverend George Fairfowl Macarthur, who also served as the proprietor of St Mark's School which he conducted first at the rectory, then at Macquarie Fields and later at The Kings School, Parramatta.

The current rector, since 2013, is the Reverend Michael Jensen, a son of a former Archbishop of Sydney, the Most Reverend Peter Jensen.

== See also ==
- List of Anglican churches in the Diocese of Sydney
- Anglican Diocese of Sydney
