= Bishop of Sydney =

Bishop of Sydney may refer to:

- Catholic Bishops and Archbishops of Sydney
- List of Anglican bishops of Sydney
