= William Dumbrell =

Australian biblical scholar

William John Dumbrell (1926 – 1 October 2016) was an Australian biblical scholar.

Dumbrell was converted in 1951, and studied at Moore Theological College before being ordained as priest in the Anglican church in February 1957. He undertook further studies at the University of Sydney (M.A., 1958), the University of London (B.D. and M.Th.) and Harvard University (Th.D., 1969). Dumbrell had served on the faculty of Regent College, Macquarie University, Moore Theological College, the University of Sydney, Trinity Theological College, Singapore and Emmaus Bible College.

In 2010, a Festschrift was published in his honour, An Everlasting Covenant: Biblical and Theological Essays in Honour of William J. Dumbrell (ISBN 9780980667615), which included contributions from Bruce Waltke and Allan Harman. He died in Sydney on 1 October 2016. Michael Jensen suggests that, along with that of Donald Robinson and Graeme Goldsworthy, Dumbrell's work "has been crucial for shaping how Sydney Anglicans think about and preach from the Bible."
