= Bernard Judd =

Australian priest

Bernard Judd (1918–1999) was an Anglican cleric from Sydney, Australia.

Judd had been a student at Sydney Boys High School and later gave scripture lessons there. He studied at Moore Theological College and was ordained in 1943. He was the rector of St Peter's East Sydney from 1947 to 1986. He was a man of strong belief and was noted for his opposition to alcohol, drugs, gambling, organised crime and (in earlier years) the Roman Catholic Church. He broadcast on local radio station 2CH and wrote many letters to the Sydney Morning Herald. He was made a Member of the Order of the British Empire (MBE) and Order of Australia (OAM).

Judd worked with Robert Brodribb Hammond to support the less fortunate.

"Bernard Judd was a Christian man of quite remarkable stickability in those causes and convictions to which he had committed himself. His convictions were strong, but he was no bigot. He was independent in mind and judgement." — Bishop Donald Robinson.

There is a Bernard Judd Foundation and a Bernard Judd Memorial Lecture.
