= Phillip Jensen =

Australian cleric (born 1945)

The Very Reverend Phillip Jensen
- Dean of Sydney
- Church: Anglican Church of Australia
- Province: New South Wales
- Diocese: Sydney
- In office: 2003–2014
- Predecessor: Boak Jobbins
- Successor: Kanishka Raffel

Personal details
- Born: Phillip David Jensen; 1945 (age 80–81) Sydney, New South Wales, Australia

Phillip David Jensen (born 1945) is an Australian cleric of the Anglican Diocese of Sydney and the former Dean of St Andrew's Cathedral. He is the brother of Peter Jensen, the former Anglican Archbishop of Sydney.

== Early life and conversion ==
Jensen spent the early years of his life living at Bellevue Hill, a suburb in the eastern suburbs of Sydney. His first public statement of faith came at a Billy Graham crusade in 1959. He married his wife Helen in 1969.

== Education and ministry ==
Jensen studied theology at Moore Theological College from 1967 to 1970 and won the Hey Sharp prize for coming first in the Licenciate of Theology (ThL), the standard course of study at that time. In the years just after his graduation from Moore College, Jensen worked at St Matthew's Manly and with John Chapman at the Department of Evangelism (now known as Evangelism and New Churches). Jensen became Anglican chaplain to the University of New South Wales (UNSW) in 1975 and Rector of St Matthias' Centennial Park in 1977.

Jensen based his university ministry around expository preaching and "walk-up evangelism". The result was a large number of conversions, large student gatherings at UNSW and the growth of St Matthias' Church from a group of 20–30 in 1977 to well over 1000 by the mid 1990s.

Jensen's work at UNSW included the creation of the Ministry Training Strategy (MTS) which trained young men and women in practical ministry skills, preparing them for church ministry, ordained or otherwise. He also founded the Australian Christian publishing house Matthias Media to allow the publication of Christian literature by Australian authors. From 1974 to 1991 Jensen led the reinvigoration of the Katoomba Christian Convention. He also authored the Two Ways To Live gospel tract and founded The Briefing. He has also been involved in the establishment of some independent evangelical churches and facilitated links between them and the Anglican Diocese of Sydney.

In 2003 the chapter of St Andrew's Cathedral in Sydney appointed Jensen as Dean of Sydney. On 6 July 2014 Jensen announced to the congregations of the cathedral that he would be resigning as the dean and leaving at the end of 2014.

== Views ==
Jensen has spoken publicly against secularism, syncretism, intellectual relativism, gambling and same-sex relationships He is an opponent of the ordination of women to the priesthood and episcopate within the Anglican Church of Australia. In 2004, Jensen gave a speech against liberal Christian views of homosexuality, referring to "theological prostitution" after paraphrasing the liberal views of Rowan Williams, the Archbishop of Canterbury. The publication of the comment, accusing Jensen of challenging Williams, drew ire from the secular media and Anglican commentators in the United Kingdom and Australia. Jensen responded to the criticism by confirming that he called for Williams to resign but suggested that he had been "grossly misrepresented" by The Guardian and later saying that the secular media is biased against Christians.

Jensen and his brother Peter have promoted lay administration of the Lord's Supper. Jensen has offered opinions on the future structure and functioning of the Anglican Communion in response to the ordination of non-celibate gay people to the episcopacy, calling on bishops to refuse to attend the Lambeth Conference.

Jensen's attitude to traditional Anglican styles of cathedral worship has drawn criticism, especially from defenders of classical sacred music such as the Tallis Scholars' director, Peter Phillips, who accused him of "vandalising" Anglican culture. Jensen has defended his changes in the cathedral's style of worship on the grounds of attempting to broaden the demographic of the congregation. Jensen, as with most Sydney Anglican clergy, has discarded use of the cassock and scarf and even the canonically-required surplice but has revived use of the Geneva gown. Choral Evensong on Sunday evenings has been replaced with a more contemporary style of gathering. Jensen has stated that the cathedral choir continues to play an active role in the life of the cathedral, though others point out that its opportunities for performance have been much diminished, a conflict which led to the departure of the previous music director, Michael Deasey. The St Andrew's Cathedral School's Girls' Vocal Ensemble was, for the first time, allowed a regular opportunity to sing in the cathedral, but this has since changed. The liturgy in St Andrew's Cathedral has undergone considerable change since Jensen's appointment as dean, though according to him and his supporters it remains grounded in the theological outlook of the Book of Common Prayer of 1662 with its emphasis on the confession of sin and salvation solely through the merits of Christ.

Shortly after Jensen's brother Peter was appointed as Archbishop of Sydney, Jensen was nominated as Dean of Sydney. Peter Jensen also appointed his own wife, Christine Jensen, to an official (unpaid) position in the diocese, leading to accusations of nepotism.
