= John Chapman (evangelist) =

Australian preacher, Bible teacher and evangelist

John Charles Chapman (1930–2012), commonly known as Chappo, was an Australian Anglican evangelist and preacher. For twenty-five years he served as Director of the Anglican Department of Evangelism in Sydney, where he influenced a generation of clergy and lay leaders through his preaching, mentoring, and training. He was widely recognized for his clear communication style and for his books on Christian faith and evangelism.

Chapman was born in Sydney, New South Wales, in 1930. He trained as a schoolteacher before entering Moore Theological College to study theology. Following ordination, he served as a curate in Moree, New South Wales, where he initiated interchurch prayer meetings and evangelistic outreach within the local community.

In 1968 Chapman was appointed Director of the Anglican Department of Evangelism in Sydney, a position he held until 1993. In this role he conducted missions across Australia and internationally, while also mentoring younger ministers. His leadership helped shape evangelical practice within the Anglican Diocese of Sydney and encouraged public proclamation of the Christian message.

Chapman was known for his clear and practical style of preaching. His book A Fresh Start (1981) became one of the most widely distributed Christian books in Australia, selling tens of thousands of copies. Other works included Know and Tell the Gospel (1979), A Sinner’s Guide to Holiness (2000), and Making the Most of the Rest of Your Life (2002). He frequently spoke at university missions, church conventions, and evangelistic rallies, and was invited to address audiences outside Australia.

Chapman’s ministry left a lasting influence within Australian Anglicanism and the wider evangelical movement. His emphasis on gospel clarity shaped preachers such as Phillip Jensen and Peter Jensen. In recognition of his contribution, Moore Theological College named a residential building John Chapman House in his honour. His writings continue to be used in evangelism training and lay ministry contexts.
