= T. C. Hammond =

Irish academic (1877–1961)

Thomas Chatterton Hammond (20 February 1877 – 16 November 1961) was an Irish Anglican cleric whose work on reformed theology and Protestant apologetics has been influential among evangelicals, especially in Ireland, Australia and South Africa. He was also Grand Master of the Grand Orange Lodge of New South Wales.

== Biography ==
Born in Cork to Colman Mark Hammond a farmer and his second wife, Elizabeth (née Sergeant). After his father died in 1883 he lived for some time with a Roman Catholic aunt. He was educated at Cork Model School and at age 13 he went to work as a railway clerk. He became a member of the Church of Ireland in 1892. He also joined the newly formed YMCA in Cork and studied with John McNay (his future brother in law) the YMCA librarian.

At the age of 18 he entered the Irish Church Missions Training School in Dublin. Hammond was ordained as a deacon in the Church of Ireland in 1903 and priest in 1905. He was appointed curate of St. Kevin's Church, Camden Row, Dublin, and the Hammond family lived on nearby Synge Street. He received a BA in 1903 and subsequently an MA from Trinity College Dublin. Later in life he was awarded a Th.D. from the Australian College of Theology (ACT). He married Margaret McNay from Cork (of Scottish extraction but born in County Tipperary) in 1906, they had three sons; John Colman, Thomas Chatterton ('Chat'), Charles Kimble ('Carl') and a daughter, Doris.

He was superintendent of the Irish Church Missions to the Roman Catholics from 1919 to 1936, where he engaged in evangelistic missions in Dublin and often in controversies with Roman Catholic apologists. A lively intellectual, his expertise in doctrinal difficulty was often sought by the bishops of the Church of Ireland, but not always publicly acknowledged. Hammond also helped draw up the constitution of the Anglican Church of Australia (at that time called the Church of England in Australia) and safe-guarded the independence of the Anglican Diocese of Sydney. He was also helpful in drawing up a constitution for the Church of England in South Africa, a denomination which was created separately from the largely Anglo-Catholicism dominated Church of the Province of South Africa.

In 1936, Hammond left Ireland to take up position as Principal of Moore Theological College, Sydney. In addition, he was made the rector of St Philip's, York Street. He was made an archdeacon in 1949. His best-known books are In Understanding be Men (a handbook of Christian doctrine) and The One Hundred Texts, with Bible verses explaining Reformed teaching. He continued to debate Catholics, with his program on radio 2CH competing with that of the Catholic apologist Dr Rumble on 2SM

Hammond was a controversial figure both in Ireland and Australia as a member of the Orange Order in Dublin and Sydney, eventually rising to the position of Grand Master of the Orange Institution of New South Wales in 1961. In recent times, his involvement in the establishment and running of the Bethany Home in Dublin, a home for orphans, unmarried mothers and their children, and petty criminals, has also been raised for questioning, particularly due to the high mortality rate. The home is subject to ongoing calls to be added to the State redress scheme for victims of child, neglect, sexual and physical abuse. Hammond sat on the board of trustees of the Bethany Home from 1922 until 1935, as other members of the Church of Ireland clergy did throughout its existence.

Hammond died on 16 November 1961 in Sydney. A biography, T C Hammond - Irish Christian, by Rev. Warren Nelson (founder of the Irish Bible Institute) was published in 1994.

== Publications ==
- Authority in the church: Being an examination into the position and jurisdiction of bishops in the Anglican Communion, Figgis & Co, Dublin, 1921.
- "The Evangelical Revival and the Oxford Movement", Churchman 47(2), 1933.
- In Understanding Be Men, Inter-Varsity Press, 1936.
- Perfect Freedom, 1939.
- Fading Light, The Tragedy of Spiritual Decline in Germany, Marshall, Morgan & Scott, 1942.
- Age-Long Questions, Marshall, 1942.
- Reasoning Faith: An Introduction to Christian Apologetics, Inter-Varsity Fellowship, 1943.
- The One Hundred Texts - A Manual of Theology, 1952.
- The New Creation, Marshall, Morgan & Scott, London, 1953.
