= Lukyn Williams =

New Testament scholar

- Born: Arthur Lukyn Williams; 1853
- Died: 1943 (aged 89–90)

Academic work
- Discipline: theology
- Institutions: Jesus College, Cambridge; Moore Theological College
- Main interests: New Testament

Arthur Lukyn Williams (1853–1943) was a Hebrew New Testament scholar at Jesus College, Cambridge. He was also a Christian apologist active in Christian mission to Jews.

== Life ==
Williams earned the BA Theology Tripos in 1875 (first class honours). He was awarded the MA Degree in 1878 and in 1906 Williams earned his BD. From 1911, he held his D.D.

Williams was ordained to the priesthood in 1877, and became principal of Moore Theological College in 1878. From 1878 until 1884 he was the third Principal of Moore Theological College in Sydney, New South Wales. From 1885 until 1891, He was subsequently Rector of Ampton, Suffolk. From 1895 to 1919 He was Vicar of Guilden Morden, Cambridgeshire (near Cambridge), and he also was Honorary Canon of Ely Cathedral, and Chaplain to Sir George Fordham.

== Works ==
- Famines In India: Their Causes And Possible Prevention being the Cambridge University Le Bas Prize essay, 1875 London : HS King. 1876. xv. [1]. 160 p.; 20 cm.
- A Manual Of Christian Evidences For Jewish People 1911
- St. Matthew (2 vols) 1917
- Justin Martyr – The Dialogue with Trypho, 1930.
- Adversus Judaeos. A Bird's-Eye View of Christian Apologiae until the Renaissance, Cambridge, Cambridge University Press, 1935
- Epistle Of Paul The Apostle To The Galatians
- The Epistles Of Paul The Apostle To The Colossians: And To Philemon
