= Fellowship of Independent Evangelical Churches (Australia) =

Evangelical denomination in Australia

- Classification: Evangelical Protestant
- Polity: Congregational
- National Director: Vacant
- Origin: 2002
- Congregations: 55 (2022)
- Official website: www.fiec.org.au

The Fellowship of Independent Evangelical Churches is an evangelical denomination in Australia. It consists of 55 churches across six states. It is based in Lyneham, Australian Capital Territory.

The FIEC as a denomination started in 2002 (although early church plants began in the 1990s) and has experienced significant growth.

Most of the churches were formed as church plants by clergy trained at Moore Theological College, but operating outside the Diocese of Sydney. Although trained at Moore College and other theological colleges, senior pastors are not required to be ordained as deacons or priests/ministers by the FIEC. There were objections to these church plants by other local churches at the time. In 2020, many of the church plants did not have their own church buildings, and met at local schools.

The FIEC denomination is complementarian and requires the male senior pastors, who are the only representatives of its affiliated churches, to agree to and uphold this doctrine to maintain their membership of the FIEC.

Al Stewart was the National Director from March 2020 to September 2024; as of October 2024, the National Director position is vacant.
