= Donald Robinson (bishop) =

Anglican Archbishop of Sydney

The Most Reverend Donald Robinson AO
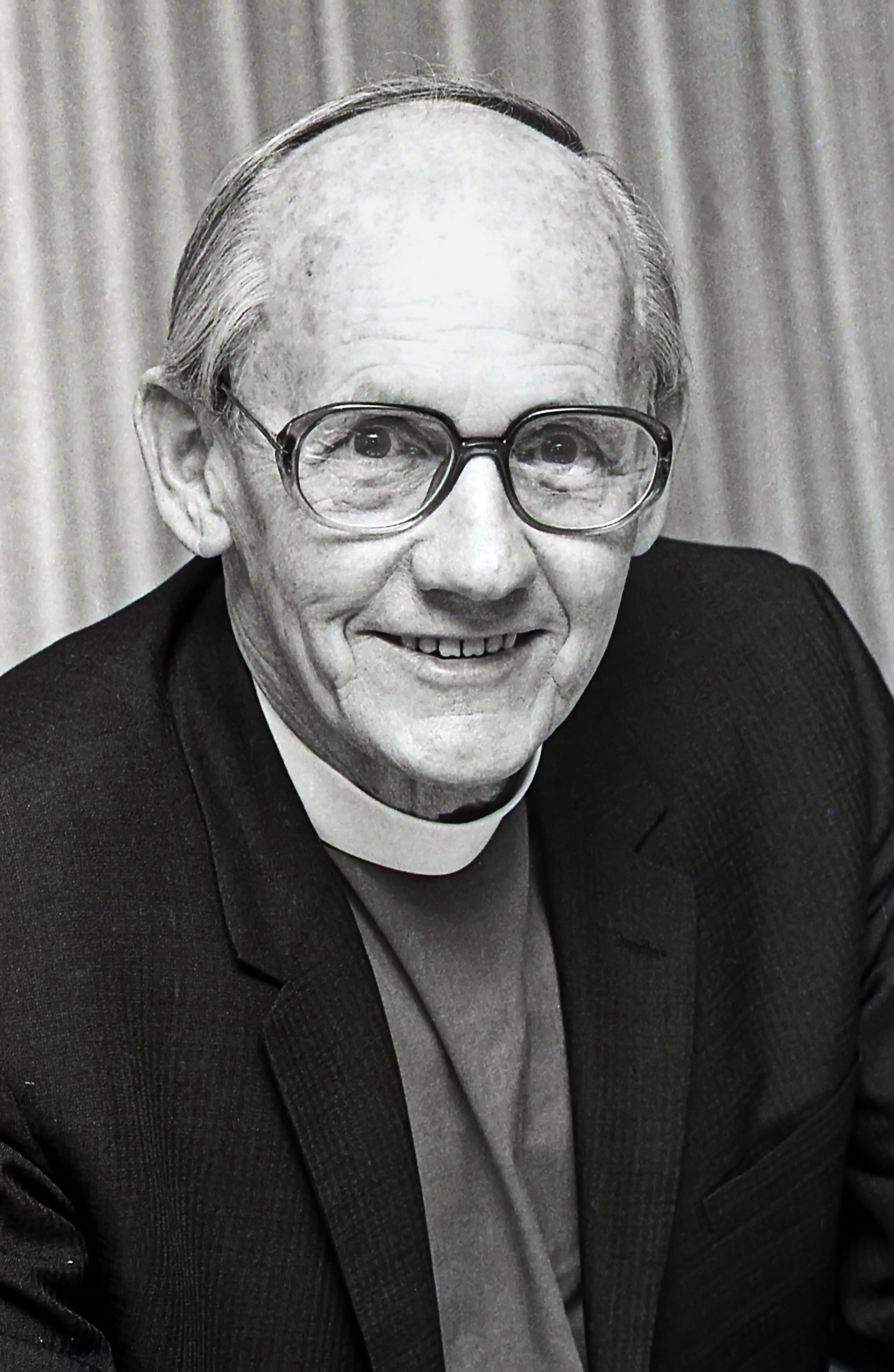
- Diocese: Sydney
- In office: 1982–1993
- Predecessor: Marcus Loane
- Successor: Harry Goodhew
- Other post: Bishop of Parramatta (1973–1982)

Orders
- Ordination: 1950
- Consecration: 1973

Personal details
- Born: Donald William Bradley Robinson; 9 November 1922 Lithgow, New South Wales, Australia
- Died: 7 September 2018 (aged 95) North Turramurra, New South Wales, Australia
- Spouse: Marie Robinson (née Taubman)
- Education: North Sydney Boys High School; Sydney Church of England Grammar School
- Alma mater: University of Sydney; Queens' College, Cambridge

Donald William Bradley Robinson AO (9 November 1922 – 7 September 2018) was an Australian bishop in the Anglican Church of Australia. He was Archbishop of Sydney from 1982 to 1993.

== Family and education ==
Robinson was born in Lithgow, New South Wales on 9 November 1922, the son of Gertrude Marston Ross and Richard Bradley Robinson (1888–1966), sometime Archdeacon of North Sydney, rector of Leichhardt and Broadway, and director of the Home Mission Society.

Robinson's first year of secondary school studies was at North Sydney Boys High School; he was then educated at Sydney Church of England Grammar School. In 1938 he moved with his family to accommodation provided at Moore Theological College in Newtown.

Robinson's high school Greek studies continued in 1940 at the University of Sydney where he studied Arts, including Latin, Greek and English. His undergraduate studies were interrupted by service in World War II, during which he worked in military intelligence as a traffic analyst in Brisbane and New Guinea. In 1946 he resumed his studies and was elected President of the Sydney University Evangelical Union, serving alongside Vice-President Marie Taubman (the two became engaged later that year).

From 1947–1950, Robinson studied the Theology Tripos at Queens' College, Cambridge where his approach to New Testament exegesis and biblical theology was shaped by C. H. Dodd and C. F. D. Moule.

Donald returned during his studies in Cambridge to marry Marie Taubman on 30 July 1949. They had four children: Martin, Peter, Anne and Mark. His niece is the retired actress and working psychologist Belinda Bauer.

== Ordained ministry ==
Robinson was ordained deacon on 12 November 1950 at St Stephen's Willoughby by Howard Mowll, Archbishop of Sydney, and began his ministry with curacies at St Matthew's, Manly and St Philip's Church, Sydney. He was priested on 21 December 1951.

From 1952, Robinson was then a lecturer and vice-principal at Moore College and concurrently at Sydney University until 1973 when he became the Bishop of Parramatta. He was consecrated a bishop on 25 January 1973 at St Andrew's Cathedral, Sydney. Nine years later (1 April 1982) he was elected as Archbishop of Sydney and the Metropolitan of New South Wales. He retired in 1993 and resumed teaching at Moore Theological College until 2002.

Michael Jensen argues that, along with that of Bill Dumbrell and Graeme Goldsworthy, Robinson's work "has been crucial for shaping how Sydney Anglicans think about and preach from the Bible." His lectures at Sydney University and Moore College were published as Faith's Framework. Graeme Goldsworthy credits Robinson's teaching with producing a "radical and permanent shift in my thinking" of biblical theology.

Robinson was made an Officer of the Order of Australia in 1984.

Australia's largest single theological library, at Moore Theological College, Sydney, is named after him.

Religious titles
| Preceded by Marcus Loane | Archbishop of Sydney; 1982–1992 | Succeeded by Harry Goodhew |
