= Al Stewart (bishop) =

Australian evangelical bishop

Alan Stewart (born 1959) is an Australian bishop. He is most well-known for having been the National Director of the Fellowship of Independent Evangelical Churches in Australia.

== Education ==
Stewart studied Commerce at the University of New South Wales. He worked in business for a time but later decided to go into Christian ministry. He trained at Moore Theological College.

== Theological career ==
He was an assistant bishop in the Anglican Diocese of Sydney and oversaw the diocese's Wollongong region from 2007 until 2010. and served parishes in Tregear, New South Wales and Centennial Park. His last position before his ordination to the episcopate was as the CEO of Anglican Youthworks.

In 2009, Stewart was appointed to the Evangelism Ministries in the Diocese of Sydney. In January 2015 he was appointed Sydney director for the City Bible Forum.

In March 2020, Stewart was appointed as National Director of the FIEC Australia. He remained the National Director through September 2024 and was a featured speaker during the FIEC 2024 National Conference, but by October 2024 he was no longer listed on the FIEC's website.

== Personal life ==
Stewart is married to Kathy and they have four children.
