= Sunday Services =

Anglican prayer book

Sunday Services is a modern revision of the Anglican Book of Common Prayer produced by the Diocese of Sydney in Australia in response to the theological patterns displayed in recent revisions. The book is designed to preserve the reformed theology of the 1662 Book of Common Prayer, but in more accessible modern language.
