= Graeme Goldsworthy =

Australian theologian

The Reverend Graeme Goldsworthy
- Born: 7 September 1934 (age 92)

Ecclesiastical career
- Religion: Christianity (Anglican)
- Church: Anglican Church of Australia
- Ordained: 1958

Scholarly background
- Education: University of Cambridge; Union Theological Seminary in Virginia
- Thesis: Empirical Wisdom in Relation to Salvation-History in the Psalms (1973)
- Academic advisors: John Bright; Patrick D. Miller
- Influences: Donald Robinson

Scholarly work
- Discipline: Biblical studies; theology
- Sub-discipline: Biblical theology; Old Testament studies
- School or tradition: Evangelical Anglicanism
- Notable works: According to Plan (1991); Preaching the Whole Bible as Christian Scripture (2000)

Graeme L. Goldsworthy (born 7 September 1934) is an Australian evangelical Anglican theologian specialising in the Old Testament and Biblical theology. His most significant work is a trilogy: Gospel and Kingdom, Gospel and Wisdom, and The Gospel in Revelation. Goldsworthy has authored several other books including According to Plan: The Unfolding Revelation of God in the Bible, and Preaching the Whole Bible as Christian Scripture. He holds a Master of Arts degree from the University of Cambridge in England, and Master of Theology and Doctor of Philosophy degrees from Union Theological Seminary, Richmond, Virginia (now named Union Presbyterian Seminary).

Goldsworthy is best known for his motif of "God's people in God's place under God's rule." He has been influential across the world, but especially in the Anglican Diocese of Sydney. Michael Jensen notes that, along with that of Donald Robinson and Bill Dumbrell, Goldsworthy's work "has been crucial for shaping how Sydney Anglicans think about and preach from the Bible." Eric Brian Watkins suggests that it has "done much to vitalize interest" in redemptive-historical preaching and hermeneutics. Goldworthy's approach heavily influenced The Big Picture Story Bible.

== Works ==
=== Books ===
- Goldsworthy, Graeme (1973). Empirical wisdom in relation to salvation-history in the Psalms (PhD). Union Theological Seminary in Virginia. OCLC 26268547.
- ——— (1991). According to Plan: The Unfolding Revelation of God in the Bible. Downers Grove, IL: InterVarsity Press. ISBN 978-0-851-10955-8.
- ——— (1993). The Tree of Life: Reading Proverbs Today. AIO Press. ISBN 978-0-9491-0844-9.
- ——— (1994). Gospel and Kingdom: A Christian Interpretation of the Old Testament. Biblical Classics Library. Paternoster Press. ISBN 978-0-8536-4608-2.
- ——— (1994). Gospel in Revelation: Gospel and Apocalypse. Biblical Classics Library. Paternoster Press. ISBN 978-0-8536-4630-3.
- ——— (1995). Gospel and Wisdom: Israel's Wisdom Literature in the Christian Life. Biblical Classics Library. Paternoster Press. ISBN 978-0-8536-4651-8.
- ——— (2000). Preaching the Whole Bible as Christian Scripture: The Application of Biblical Theology to Expository Preaching. Downers Grove, IL: InterVarsity Press. ISBN 978-0-851-11539-9.
- ——— (2000). The Goldsworthy Trilogy. Paternoster Press. ISBN 978-1842270363. re-publication of Gospel and Kingdom, Gospel and Wisdom and The Gospel in Revelation
- ——— (2002). According to Plan: The Unfolding Revelation of God in the Bible (Revised ed.). Downers Grove, IL: InterVarsity Press. ISBN 978-0-830-82696-4. OCLC 50113415.
- ——— (2003). Prayer and the Knowledge of God: What the Whole Bible Teaches. Downers Grove, IL: IVP Academic. ISBN 978-0-851-11398-2.
- ——— (2010). Gospel-Centered Hermeneutics: Foundations and Principles of Evangelical Biblical Interpretation. Downers Grove, IL: IVP Academic. ISBN 978-0-830-83869-1.
- ——— (2012). Christ-Centered Biblical Theology: Hermeneutical Foundations and Principles. Downers Grove, IL: IVP Academic. ISBN 978-0-830-83969-8.
- ——— (2015). The Son of God and the New Creation. Short Studies in Biblical Theology. Wheaton, IL: Crossway Press. ISBN 978-1-4335-4535-1.

=== Selected articles ===
- ——— (Summer 2006). "Biblical Theology and Hermeneutics". Southern Baptist Journal of Theology. 10 (2): 4–21.
- ——— (Winter 2006). "A Biblical-Theological Perspective on Prayer". Southern Baptist Journal of Theology. 10 (4): 14–25.
- ——— (Spring 2008). "The Kingdom of God as Hermeneutic Grid". Southern Baptist Journal of Theology. 12 (1): 4–15.
