= Harry Goodhew =

Archbishop of Sydney; Bishop of Wollongong

The Right Reverend Harry Goodhew AO
- Archbishop of Sydney
- Church: Anglican Church of Australia
- Province: New South Wales
- Diocese: Sydney
- Installed: 2 April 1993
- Term ended: 9 October 2000
- Predecessor: Donald Robinson
- Successor: Peter Jensen
- Other post: Bishop of Wollongong (1982–1993)

Orders
- Ordination: 1958

Personal details
- Born: Richard Henry Goodhew; 19 March 1931 (age 95) Sydney, New South Wales, Australia
- Education: University of Wollongong
- Coat of arms

Richard Henry "Harry" Goodhew AO (born 19 March 1931 is an Australian retired Anglican bishop who was Anglican Archbishop of Sydney from 1993 to 2000. Appointed as a compromise between opposing "conservative" and "liberal" factions of the Sydney diocese, Goodhew attempted to heal rifts within the diocese while maintaining an Evangelical stance in keeping with the general ethos of the diocese.

Goodhew was born in Sydney and educated at the University of Wollongong. He was ordained in 1958 and began his ministry with curacies at St Matthew's Bondi and St Bede's Beverly Hills. Later he held incumbencies at St Paul's Carlingford and St Stephen's Coorparoo. In 1976 he was appointed a canon of St Michael's Cathedral in Wollongong and in 1979 as Archdeacon of Wollongong. He was Bishop of Wollongong from 1982 to 1993. In 1993 he was elected Archbishop of Sydney and the Metropolitan of New South Wales, retiring in 2001. He was married to Pamela Goodhew until her death on 15 November 2025.

As archbishop, Goodhew promoted the "Archbishop's Vision for Growth" founded by Donald Robinson, his predecessor. He opened pathways between the Anglican Diocese of Sydney and other churches, promoted communication between Christians and Jews, and supported the Roman Catholic-founded Cursillo movement, which rapidly expanded among more progressive Anglicans within the diocese.

While archbishop, in order to ease the tensions involved in the debate over women's ordination that had occurred under Archbishop Robinson, Goodhew placed a moratorium on discussing the issue for a time, a move strongly criticised by the Movement for the Ordination of Women. Goodhew maintained a private support for the ordination of women and gave his blessing to women who had left the Diocese of Sydney to be ordained elsewhere.

Goodhew and his late wife, Pam had a long-serving missionary role in Africa, where they visited African countries to teach, and to assist in setting up small business enterprises to aid people in need.

Anglican Communion titles
Preceded by Donald Robinson	Archbishop of Sydney; 1993–2000	Succeeded by Peter Jensen
Preceded by Ken Short	Bishop of Wollongong; 1982–1993	Succeeded by Reg Piper
