= Thomas Woolley =

Australian politician

Thomas Woolley (1809 – 18 February 1858) was an Australian autobiographer/memoirist, general merchant, immigration promoter, ironmonger, local government councillor and salt manufacturer.

== Biography ==
Woolley was born in England, a son of Thomas and Mary Honoria Woolley. He travelled to Sydney, Australia, in 1834, was back in England the following year to marry Eliza Pilmor, and returned to Sydney in September 1836.

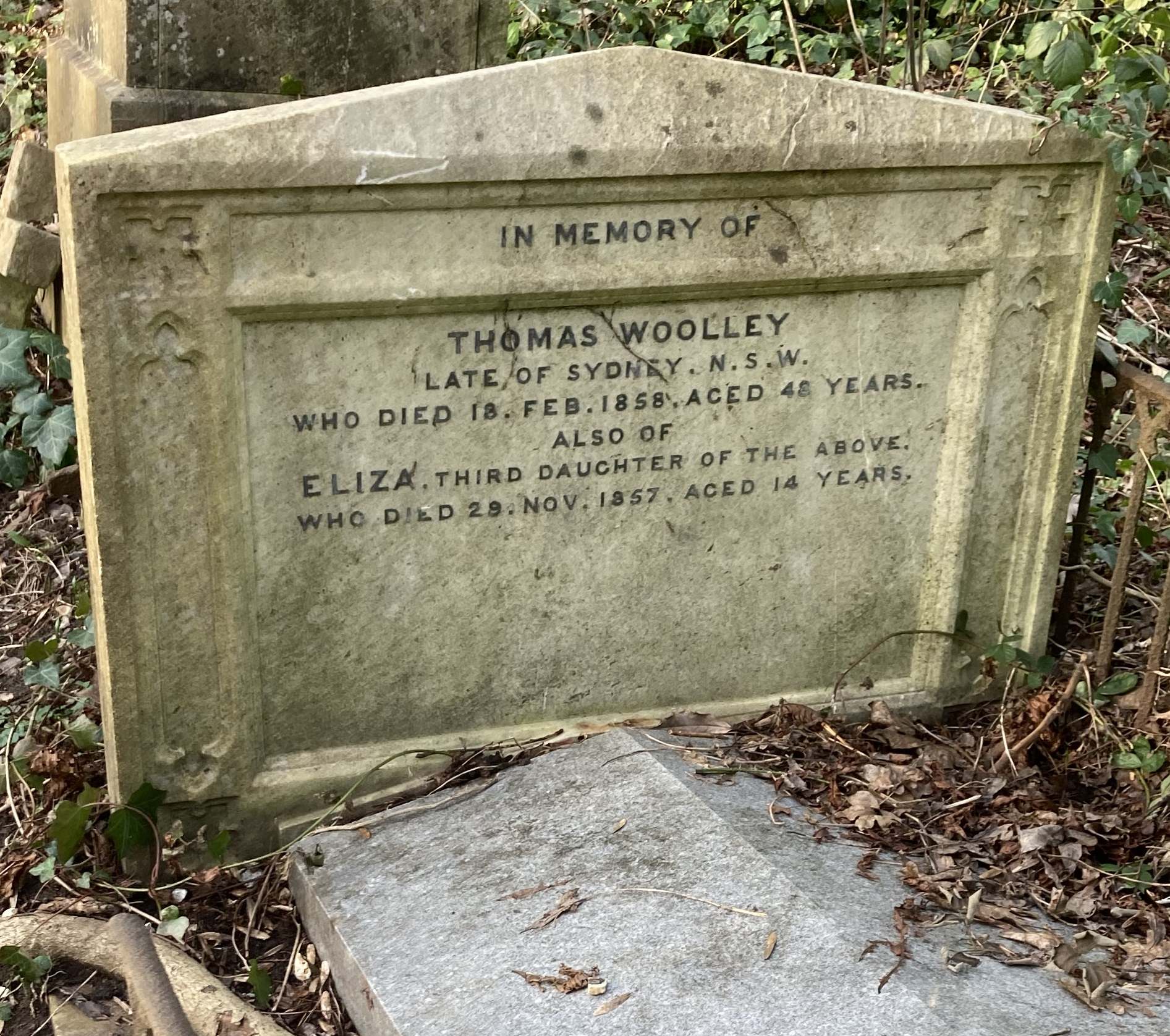
Grave of Thomas Woolley in Highgate Cemetery (west side)

In partnership with his brother Michael, in June 1834 he opened an ironmonger's store in the Birmingham and Manchester Warehouse, George Street, and within six months had to enlarge his premises. In May 1835 he bought from Gregory Blaxland an acre (.4 ha), known as Blaxland's Salt Works, on the coast at Newcastle. When the Australian Gaslight Company was founded Woolley joined its committee and in 1837 became one of its directors, serving until mid-1840 when he sailed again for England. He returned in March 1842 and in April was appointed treasurer of the Sydney Dispensary. Next year he was a member of the committee that petitioned for the importation of Indian coolies to New South Wales, and in November was elected unopposed for Cook ward to the Sydney City Council.

Meanwhile the business continued to flourish; among many other projects he supplied ironmongery for the overland expedition to Port Essington and exported whale oil and local produce to pay for his imports. By 1850 he had sold his business to Tomlins & Sloman for £10,000 and returned to London, where that year he published Reminiscences of the Life of a Bushman: Or How to Make Happiness, Abundance and Profit, the Results of Emigrating to Australia. On its title page he claimed to have '“run the gauntlet” through thick and thin, and experienced every state and stage of fortune in several of the Colonies of that vast Continent. “Aide toi, et le Ciel t'aidra”.'

Woolley retired to Regents Park with his family. Later he moved to the Victoria Hotel, St Leonard's-on-Sea, Sussex, where he died on 18 February 1858, leaving an estate valued at some £20,000 to his wife, his son, two daughters and other relations. He is buried in Highgate Cemetery.

== See also ==
- Gregory Blaxland
