= Michael Jensen (theologian) =

Australian theologian

The Reverend Michael Jensen
- Occupations: Cleric, author, speaker, lecturer
- Children: 4
- Parent: Peter Jensen
- Religion: Christianity (Anglican)
- Church: Anglican Church of Australia
- Congregations served: St Mark's Church, Darling Point
- Offices held: Rector, St Mark's Parish, Darling Point

Michael Peter Jensen (born 7 September 1970) is an Australian cleric, author and lecturer. He has been rector of the Anglican parish of St Mark's Church, Darling Point, since 2013; and was formerly a professor of theology at Moore College, Sydney. He is a son of the former archbishop of Sydney, the Most Reverend Peter Jensen.

On 6 May 2015, Jensen's book You: An Introduction (2008) was banned from state schools by the New South Wales Department of Education and Communities on the basis of a "potential risk to students in the delivery of this material, if not taught sensitively and in an age appropriate manner". The ban was lifted on 18 May 2015.

In September 2018, Jensen launched a podcast, called With All Due Respect, which he co-hosts with Megan Powell du Toit, a Baptist minister. The podcast was the first for Eternity News, an Australian Christian news site, for whom Jensen has also written many articles. The podcast has given rise to a wider project about conversation across difference, the WADR Project, which he and Powell du Toit co-direct. The project launched an online platform for articles called WADR Online. The podcast moved to the Undeceptions Network in 2022.

== Books ==
- You: An Introduction (Matthias Media, 2008)
- Martyrdom and Identity: The Self on Trial (T&T Clark, 2010)
- My God, My God - Is it Possible to Believe Anymore? (Cascade, 2012)
- Sydney Anglicanism: An Apology (Wipf & Stock, 2012)
- True Feelings: Perspectives on emotions in Christian life and ministry (Inter-Varsity Press, 2012)
- Is Forgiveness Really Free? (The Good Book Co, 2013)
- Pieces of Eternity (Acorn, 2013)
- A T&T Clark Reader in Theological Anthropology (Bloomsbury, 2017)
- Theological Anthropology and the Great Literary Genres (Fortress, 2019)
- Between Tick and Tock: What the Bible Says About How It All Begins, How It All Ends and Everything in Between (Morning Star, 2020)
- Reformation Anglican Worship: Experiencing Grace, Expressing Gratitude (Crossway, 2021)
- Subjects and Citizens: The politics of the gospel: Lessons from Romans 12–15 (Matthias Media, 2024). This was shortlisted for the 2025 Australian Christian Book of the Year award.
