= Anglican Diocese of Sydney =

Diocese in the Anglican Church of Australia

Diocese of Sydney
- Coat of arms

Location
- Country: Australia
- Territory: Sydney Metropolitan; Blue Mountains; Southern Highlands; South Coast; Illawarra; Lord Howe Island; Norfolk Island
- Ecclesiastical province: New South Wales
- Metropolitan: Archbishop of Sydney
- Coordinates: 33°52′26″S 151°12′22″E

Statistics
- Churches: 400+

Information
- Denomination: Anglican
- Rite: Book of Common Prayer; An Australian Prayer Book; Sunday Services
- Cathedral: St Andrew's Cathedral, Sydney

Current leadership
- Parent church: Anglican Church of Australia
- Archbishop: Kanishka Raffel
- Assistant bishops: 6 assistant bishops
- Dean: Sandy Grant
- Bishops emeritus: Harry Goodhew AO; Peter Jensen; Glenn Davies

Website
- Diocese of Sydney
- Logo of the Diocese

The fraction of the population of the Sydney metropolitan area that stated their religious affiliation as Anglican in the 2011 census, divided geographically by statistical area level 1

The Diocese of Sydney is a diocese in Sydney, within the Province of New South Wales of the Anglican Church of Australia. The majority of the diocese is Reformed Calvinist (also known as Reformed Anglican) and evangelical and low church in tradition.

The diocese goes as far as Lithgow in the west and the Hawkesbury River in the north, and it includes much of the New South Wales south coast. It encompasses Australia's largest city as well as the city of Wollongong, and includes Lord Howe Island and Norfolk Island. It is, geographically, among the larger Anglican dioceses in the world, though the smallest diocese in the state of New South Wales and one of the smaller dioceses in Australia. By attendance, it is also by far the largest diocese in the Anglican Church of Australia; in 2011, its 58,300 weekly attenders accounted for 37.6 percent of the Anglican Church's weekly attendance of 155,000, and in 2015, the diocese's 688 active clergy accounted for 28.1 percent of the active clergy across the church. As of 2023, the diocese reported that 48,000 adults, or about one percent of the total population in its boundaries, regularly attend services at Diocese of Sydney churches.

Kanishka Raffel, formerly Dean of St Andrew's Cathedral, Sydney since 4 February 2016, was elected as Archbishop of Sydney on 6 May 2021, and was consecrated and installed in that position on 28 May 2021.

== History ==
=== Foundations ===
==== Richard Johnson ====
The Anglican ministry has been present in Sydney since its foundation in 1788. An Evangelical cleric, Richard Johnson, was the first chaplain to the new colony of New South Wales and was sponsored by the London Missionary Society. Other chaplains, notably Samuel Marsden and William Cowper, were also sent. Their positions were unusual as their stipends were paid partly by the colonial government and some (Marsden among them) received large grants of land from the governor of the colony. Some (again including Marsden) were also magistrates. The early chaplains (Johnson and Marsden) were under the authority of the governor, as per their commissions. In 1802, Governor King declared the Parish of St. Phillip's Sydney (later named St Philip's Church, Sydney, after the Apostle) and St. John's Parramatta, (later St John's Cathedral, Parramatta) and 'that the churches now building at Sydney and Parramatta be named Saint Phillip and Saint John.'

==== Thomas Hobbes Scott ====
In 1825 Thomas Hobbes Scott the former secretary to J. T. Bigge, the commissioner of the inquiry into the administration of the colony of New South Wales by Governor Lachlan Macquarie, was appointed the first Archdeacon of Australia while still under the jurisdiction of the Bishop of Calcutta. The archdeaconry was created as a corporation sole.

In his position as archdeacon, Scott was a member of the Legislative Council (ranking next behind the Lieutenant Governor) and had almost complete control of all church matters. The Colonial Office appointed him King's Visitor to schools and so he became responsible for public education throughout the colony. His educational policy was guided by the principle that the church and education were inseparably connected and the funds to sustain them were administered by the same trustees. Since this view was shared by the Colonial Office, the governor Bathurst, in March 1826, created the Corporation of the Trustees of Church and School Lands, granting one-seventh of the lands of New South Wales to the corporation for the purposes of the Church of England and education in the colony. Scott became the ex officio Vice-President (the President being the Governor.)

It was mainly the combination of Archdeacon Scott's official positions as a member of the Legislative Council, as King's Visitor and also as Vice-President of the Corporation of Church and School Lands and of the substantial nature of the granting of the lands to the Corporation that led to Courts later holding that at this time the Church of England was the established church in the Colony of New South Wales. Scott retired in 1829 and was succeeded by William Grant Broughton. Scott was shipwrecked while returning to England and assisted the Anglican ministry in the new colony of Western Australia and then in establishing a Church of England chaplaincy in Batavia in the then Dutch East Indies.

==== William Grant Broughton ====
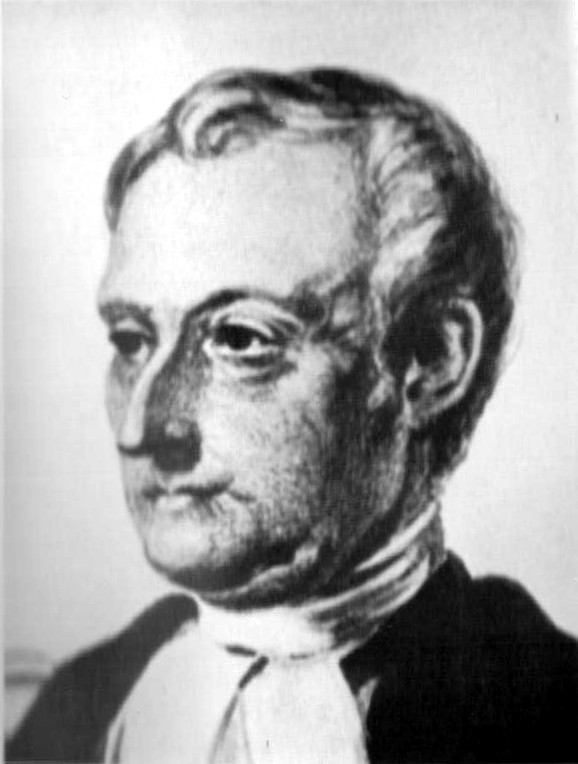
William Grant Broughton, first Bishop of Australia

William Grant Broughton succeeded Scott in 1828. During the time that Broughton was the archdeacon the corporation was abolished and the Church of England lost its favoured place and other Christian churches were also awarded glebe land in towns in the colony. Unlike in England, the Church of England was never 'established' in New South Wales.

The Diocese of Australia was formed by letters patent dated 18 January 1836 and Broughton was enthroned as Bishop of Australia on 5 June 1836. He then lost the ex officio position on the Legislative Council (though regaining it briefly later before the creation of a partly elected council in 1842). He continued an education policy and established The King's School, Sydney.

=== Formation of the diocese ===
The Diocese of Tasmania separated from the Diocese of Australia in 1842. In 1842 (after the erections of New Zealand and Tasmania dioceses), its jurisdiction was described as "Australia, Norfolk Island" (but not "Van Diemen's Land") or "New South Wales, Port Phillip (i.e. Victoria), Norfolk Island, South Australia". By letters patent of 25 June 1847, the Diocese of Australia was divided into the four separate dioceses of Sydney, Adelaide, Newcastle and Melbourne. Broughton remained as Bishop of Sydney; he became metropolitan bishop and the Diocese of Sydney recognised as the metro-political see over Newcastle, Adelaide, Melbourne, Tasmania and New Zealand. The Diocese of Sydney has been led by an archbishop since 1897.

==== Moore Theological College ====
The diocese initially relied upon priests and bishops who were trained in and had migrated from England and Ireland. Broughton had attempted to found a theological college but it closed in 1849. In 1856, Moore Theological College opened, the official theological college (seminary) for Sydney Anglicans. Since that time it has grown in size and stature. In 2006 it had in excess of 450 students, many of whom end up in ministry outside the ecclesiastical and geographical boundaries of the Sydney diocese.

=== Anglican Church League ===
Since the beginning of the 20th century, Evangelicals within the diocese were concerned about growing Anglo-Catholicism and Modernism within the church and fought very hard to preserve Sydney's Evangelical nature—especially as Tractarian clergy had started arriving from England in the 19th century. Out of this came the Anglican Church League, a body of Evangelicals who worked in the politics of the diocese to further the Evangelical cause. Currently, all bishops and most senior officeholders in the diocese are members of the Anglican Church League.

=== Anglicans Together ===
In response to the dominance of Evangelicalism and Calvinism in the diocese, a number of other Anglicans and parishes identified with different Anglican traditions of churchmanship, such as Anglo-Catholicism and Broad Church, have joined in the formation of an organisation called Anglicans Together. The organisation supports traditional forms of Anglican liturgy, such as the Book of Common Prayer, as well as encouraging a broader spectrum of theological perspective. Members of Anglicans Together also support celebrating the Eucharist every Sunday and its focus as the principal form of Christian worship. The use of vestments for clergy and an emphasis on the Catholic nature of Anglicanism are also supported.

== Characteristics of Sydney Anglicanism ==
=== Evangelical distinctives ===
Most Sydney Anglicans stand within the evangelical English Puritan traditions. Evangelicals within the diocese see themselves as standing in the heritage of the English Reformation and direct the diocese accordingly. As such the diocese officially holds to belief in the divine inspiration and authority of scripture in line with the official statement of Anglican belief, the "Articles of Religion" (more commonly known as the Thirty-Nine Articles). There are, however, a number of beliefs that differentiate the Evangelicalism of the Diocese of Sydney from other Evangelical traditions:

1. Typological interpretation of the Old Testament—a biblical theological approach which interprets Old Testament prophecies regarding the Land of Israel, the Jerusalem Temple and the Davidic Kingdom as having a typological rather than literal fulfilment in the New Covenant; thus rejecting dispensationalism but supportive of Christian Zionism, of which the first is more characteristic of American Evangelicalism. This approach is described by Graeme Goldsworthy, a Sydney theologian, in his book According to Plan.
2. Identification of church with the local congregation as opposed to a diocese or denomination. Sydney's ecclesiology, influenced by the former Principal and Vice-Principal of Moore College David Broughton Knox and Donald Robinson (later respectively Principal of George Whitefield College and Archbishop of Sydney) among others, believes that the church is God's people meeting around God's Word. This leads to church meetings being centred around the public reading, explanation and response to God's Word. Further, Anglicans in Sydney generally identify themselves primarily with their local congregation rather than a denomination or institution, and place less emphasis on the celebration of Holy Communion (called the Eucharist by many Anglicans) than do Anglicans of many other dioceses.
3. The importance of evangelism and a personal faith.

Sydney Anglicans have been described as fundamentalist and sect-like by their opponents. They respond by arguing that whereas fundamentalists interpret all parts of the Bible literally Evangelicals in Sydney interpret the Bible in the context of the literary genre.

=== Affiliation with Anglican doctrine ===
For most of the last 450 years Anglicans worldwide have used the Book of Common Prayer framed by Archbishop of Canterbury Thomas Cranmer in 1549, revised significantly in 1552 and modified slightly in 1662. They have also subscribed to, or otherwise acknowledged as foundational, the Thirty-Nine Articles of Religion as listed in the Book of Common Prayer. While the Book of Common Prayer is no longer used in many Sydney churches, the diocese still fully affirms the doctrine and principles embodied within it as they interpret them. In keeping with the theologically reformed character of the 39 Articles, the diocese holds the view that all church doctrine and traditions are subject to the authority of Scripture.

=== Disassociation from Anglican tradition ===
There are some areas of church practice that are being challenged within the diocese that have potential ramifications for the wider Anglican Communion. The system of episcopal order is under review with some eager to redefine some of the roles of the threefold order of deacons, priests and bishops.

The diocese is considering whether the laying on of hands at confirmation could be performed by the rector of the parish. Although confirmation by a priest is common practice in Orthodoxy and is permitted in certain circumstances in Roman Catholicism, in the Anglican tradition confirmation can only be celebrated by a bishop. In 2005, possibly as a precursor to this change, the diocese formally removed the requirement of confirmation prior to partaking of communion for those who have been baptised as adults. However, it is common practice throughout the diocese to allow all adults who profess genuine repentance and Christian faith to receive communion regardless of whether they have been baptised or confirmed.

Lay presidency (also known as "Lay Administration of Holy Communion") is being considered, whereby the Lord's Supper could be celebrated by deacons and authorised laity, including women. According to current church law, only ordained priests and bishops are allowed to preside at the Lord's Supper. An ordinance to permit lay presidency was not proceeded with at the diocesan synod in 2005 due to concerns regarding its legality. However, this issue hasn't died and new motions are being drafted ready to be put before the next diocesan synod. In October 2008, the Australian Church Record and the Anglican Church League published The Lord's Supper in Human Hands. Who Should Administer?, which describes the forty-year discussion of this issue in Sydney and summarises the debate. Although Sydney was not the first diocese, nor the only one, in which this issue has been raised, it has been discussed within the diocese for a number of years. This publication has been widely distributed so that the Anglican Communion might examine and consider Sydney's discussions.

==== Liturgical practice ====
Few churches sing canticles and responses, either from the 1662 Book of Common Prayer or An Australian Prayer Book.

The term "meeting" is sometimes used interchangeably with "service". The most notable example of this is St Andrew's Cathedral. Many meetings at Evangelical churches in the diocese do not use a prayer book or a liturgical form of service. There is often an early morning (e.g. 8.00 am) service that follows Morning Prayer or Holy Communion from An Australian Prayer Book. Even where no formal liturgy is used many core elements of Anglican liturgy may still be used for congregational participation, such as a corporate confession of sin, saying of creeds and corporate prayers. A screen and projector may be used in place of books. Lay or congregational participation in Sydney churches also occurs through Bible readings, leading intercessory prayer, leading the meetings, testimonies and interviews, singing and playing music. In many parishes fermented communion wine has been replaced with grape juice. Predominantly, the reason given for this is to be sensitive to people for whom alcohol could cause a problem.

==== Vestments ====
Since 1911 the diocese has prohibited the wearing of the chasuble, a vestment now generally worn elsewhere in Australia for the celebration of the Eucharist. Traditionally in Sydney most clergy have worn the choir habit for all services but a few have also worn a cope and stole when celebrating the Eucharist and at certain other services. This prohibition against chasubles was originated by Archbishop Wright, an English Evangelical, who did so on the basis that the vestment was deemed illegal, relying on decisions of the English ecclesiastical courts as finally upheld in the Privy Council in Read v Bishop of Lincoln [1892] AC 664 (see also Ritualist movement). The main objection to this vestment in the mind of Sydney Anglicans is that it is associated with the high church idea of a "sacrificing" priesthood. That idea is contrary to Sydney's low church views of both Holy Communion and of the role and function of the ordained ministry. The archbishop's practice has since been codified by a synod ordinance, making Sydney the only diocese in the whole Anglican Communion that continues to ban the wearing of chasubles, reinforcing the perceived ongoing disapproval of Anglo-Catholics in the diocese.

The cope, therefore, is often worn at Anglo-Catholic churches where the celebrant at the Eucharist would conventionally wear the chasuble. In general those clergy who robe wear a cassock, surplice, scarf and, occasionally, also an academic hood. Since about 1990 there has sometimes been a practice of wearing a long surplice without a cassock, particularly through the summer. Most clergy in the diocese, however, dispense even with these robes, conducting church services in street clothes ranging from a suit and tie or clerical collar, to smart casual attire.

== Influential people ==
=== Theological influences ===
Now the centrality of Scripture wasn’t a new idea. John Stott had come in the 60s and encouraged us to be expositors, and modelled it for us; Broughton Knox had been teaching for years about the centrality of the Bible and exposition; John Chapman (‘Chappo’) and Dudley Foord taught us to do it, and set up the School of Preachers, and so on. So the idea of expository preaching of the Scriptures was already there and active. And I’m an heir of that.

Likewise, biblical theology had been developed by Donald Robinson and then Graeme Goldsworthy. So teaching the Scriptures as a whole, with a Christ-centredness of understanding, was part of our inheritance. And that was distinctively important.

Where we moved was: if that’s what the Bible says, and we are preaching and expounding that, let’s change what we’re doing to be in accordance with it. It was the practical outworking of that movement of expository Bible teaching and biblical theology.

— Philip Jensen,
"Starting small: Interview with Phillip Jensen", 17 November 2014

The Sydney diocese has been shaped by the activities and beliefs of many influential people throughout the 20th century:

- T. C. Hammond was an Anglican from Ireland who moved to Australia to become the Principal of Moore Theological College during the 1930s. Hammond's influence was critical as he injected an intellectual Calvinism into his students. The book In Understanding Be Men, a summary of Christian doctrine, was his lasting legacy and it is still in print today.
- David Broughton Knox was Principal of Moore Theological College from 1959 until 1985. Along with Donald Robinson (Vice-Principal from 1959 until 1972), Knox pioneered the study of Biblical theology, which in turn influenced the Sydney Anglican ecclesiology. Knox was strongly opposed to Anglo-Catholic practices in parish ministry. Knox promoted the dominant role of the male, both as head of the house and head of the church.
- John Chapman was Director of Sydney's Department of Evangelism (now Evangelism Ministries) from 1970 until 1995. He used his ability as a public speaker and evangelist to promote local church missions. Evangelism thus became a priority within the Sydney Anglican churches at around the same time that church-going became less important to mainstream Australia. Chapman's influence ensured that Sydney Anglicans were able to mobilise in evangelism to prevent too many people from leaving the churches.
- Billy Graham, the American evangelist, visited Sydney for crusades in 1959, 1968 and 1979. Many who were converted at the 1959 crusade ended up studying at Moore Theological College and entering the ministry, including Peter Jensen and Phillip Jensen (below). The 1959 crusade had a permanent influence on Sydney Anglicans, who placed a great priority on preaching the gospel and calling for a personal decision of faith.
- John Stott, the English preacher and former rector of All Souls, Langham Place, visited Australia many times during the 1960s, 1970s and 1980s. He introduced Sydney Anglicans to expository preaching as the main method of preaching sermons. Thus many Anglican churches in Sydney are regularly exposed to a preaching style that works through Bible passages, explains them and applies them to everyday life. Rather than preaching topical or theological sermons, Sydney Anglican preachers are more likely to preach systematically through verses, chapters and books of the Bible. However, prominent figures within the influential Anglican Church League have criticised Stott for supporting the doctrine of Annihilationism.
- Peter Jensen entered Moore Theological College in the late 1960s and was appointed principal in 1985. In 2001 he was elected Archbishop of Sydney and he immediately called on all churches in the Sydney diocese to aim to reach 10% of their communities by 2012.
- Phillip Jensen, Peter Jensen's younger brother, became chaplain to the University of New South Wales in 1975 and Rector of St Matthias' Centennial Park in 1977. He is deeply conservative in his Calvinist theology yet radical and iconoclastic in his ministry style. His work at the University of New South Wales included the creation of the Ministry Training Strategy (MTS) which trained young men and women in practical ministry skills before sending them to Moore Theological College. In 2003 Jensen was appointed as Dean of St Andrew's Cathedral in Sydney.
- D. A. Carson, Canadian-born Reformed Evangelical New Testament theologian, currently teaching at Trinity Evangelical Divinity School in Chicago, Illinois. Carson is a regular visitor to the Anglican Diocese of Sydney.

=== Notable former archbishops ===
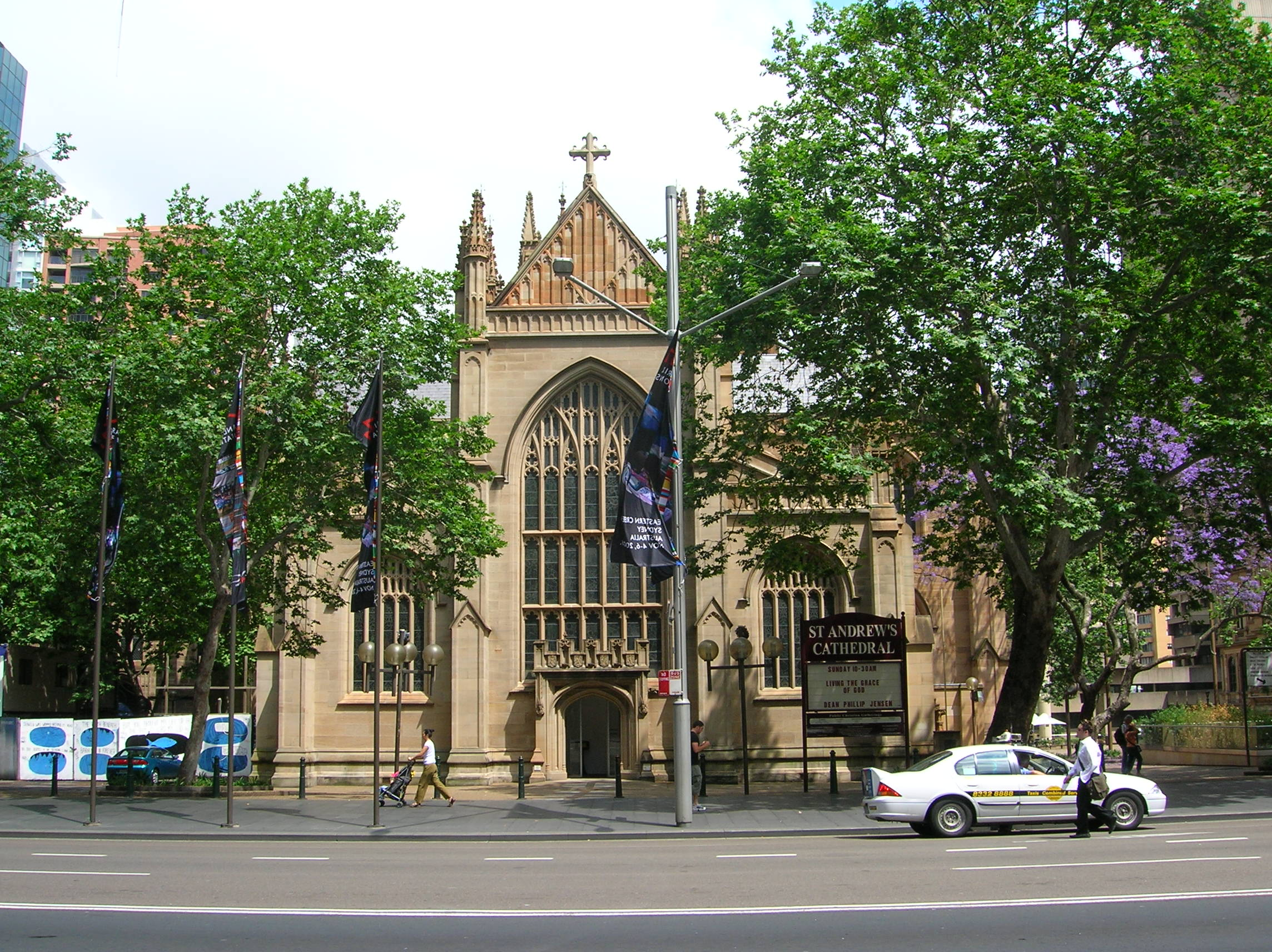
St Andrew's Cathedral, viewed from George Street

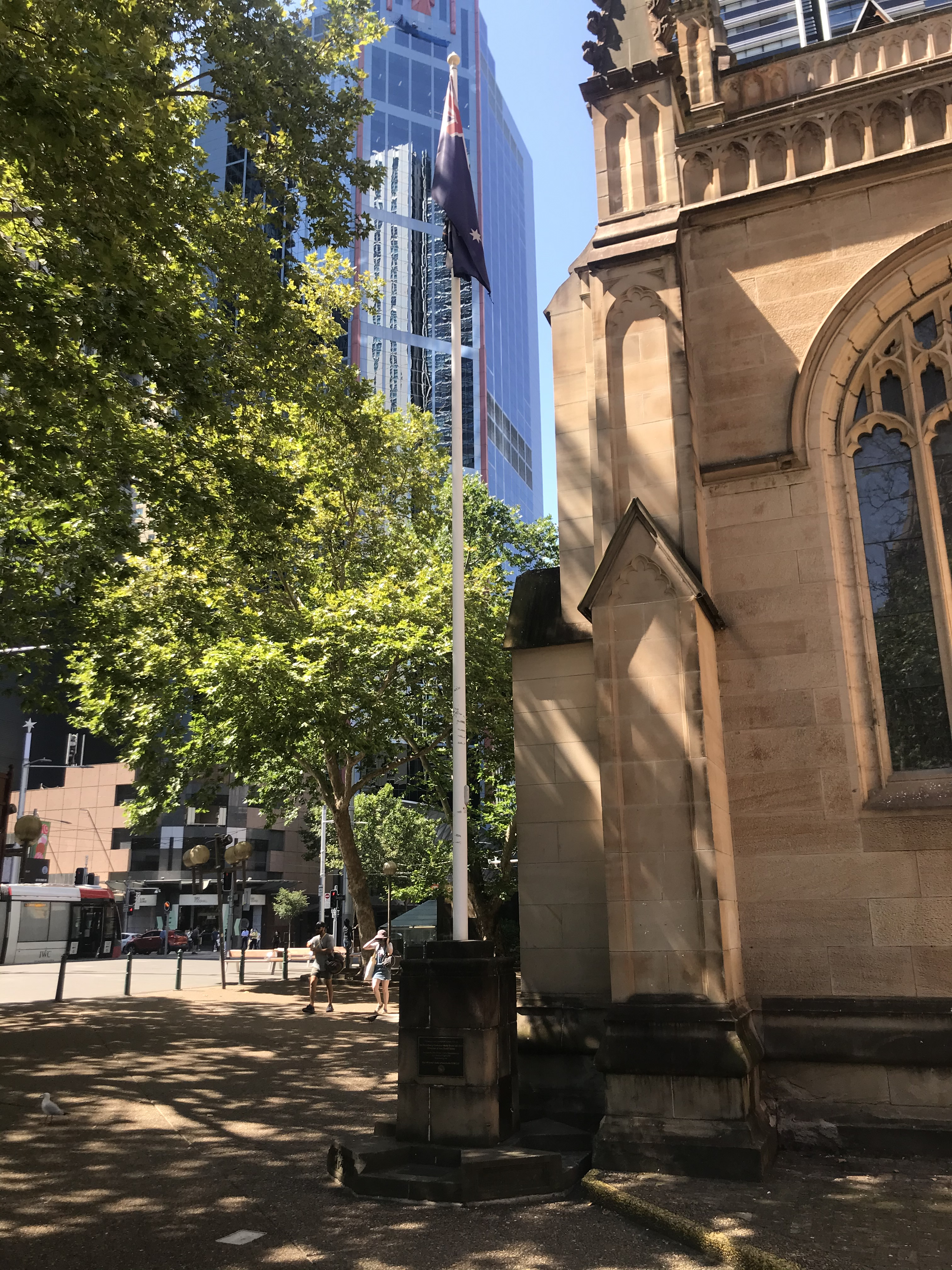
CENEF memorial flag pole at St Andrew's Cathedral

- Howard West Kilvinton Mowll, archbishop from 1933 to 1958. Mowll's vision for church planting, overseas missions, and church welfare work is unrivalled in Australian history. As a staunch Evangelical, returning from the mission field of China, Mowll experienced early difficulties in a predominantly liberal church; before rising to national prominence during the war years with his assistance rendered to many in need during this time. Within a month of World War II starting he had formed the Church of England National Emergency Fund (CENEF) which was supported with volunteers and fundraising by the Sydney Diocesan Churchwomen's Association. CENEF funded huts for recreation and chaplains in military camps around Sydney, as well as at St Andrew's Cathedral and other churches around Sydney. To continue to help ex-service people after the war and youth work, CENEF raised funds to buy 201 Castlereagh Street, Sydney, and Rathane in the Royal National Park. CENEF leveraged the Castlereagh St building to buy land at Gilbulla and 47 hectares (117 acres) in Castle Hill for a retirement village. This retirement village was one of his great achievements (some say Dorothy, Mowll's wife, was the driving force behind the idea), and became the first retirement village in Australia. Today this site remains the flagship for the Diocese's Anglican Retirement Villages. In 1947, following WWII, Mowll was elected Primate of Australia.
- Marcus Loane, archbishop from 1966 to 1982. Loane was the first Australian-born Archbishop of Sydney and was the Primate of Australia from 1978 to 1982.
- Donald Robinson, archbishop from 1982 to 1993. As a theologian and former Vice-Principal of Moore Theological College, he was highly regarded in Sydney for his evangelical teaching. He put much energy into church planting in new housing areas and in building up existing churches in populous low-income suburbs. He was strongly opposed to the ordination of women.
- Harry Goodhew, archbishop from 1993 to 2001. Appointed as a moderate "conservative", Goodhew attempted to heal rifts within the Diocese while maintaining a conservative Evangelical stance. He continued to promote the Archbishop's Vision for Growth founded by Robinson. Goodhew opened pathways between the Anglican Diocese of Sydney and other churches, promoted communication between Christians and Jews and supported the Roman Catholic-founded Cursillo movement which rapidly expanded among some more progressive Anglicans within the Diocese. To ease the tensions involved in the debate over women's ordination, Goodhew placed a moratorium on discussing the issue for a time.

== Relationships, politics and policy ==
=== Relationship with Australian Anglicanism ===
For most of the last century the uncompromisingly Evangelical positions adopted by the leaders of the Sydney diocese have contrasted with that of most other Anglican dioceses in Australia which have tended to be more Anglo-Catholic in their style of worship. This contrast helped to delay the adoption of a constitution for the Australian church and, in 1942, led to legal action being taken, ostensibly by members of the parish of Canowindra, a small town in the Diocese of Bathurst, but strongly supported by members of the Sydney diocese, Broughton Knox and T. C. Hammond (who both gave evidence in the ensuing proceedings) against the then Bishop of Bathurst, Arnold Lomas Wylde. In these proceedings, which ended in a split decision in the High Court of Australia, those bringing the action sought to prevent the parishes in the Bathurst diocese from using "The Red Book", a devotional manual authorised by the bishop.

These differences in teaching and style of worship have become more marked in recent years as those leading the Diocese of Sydney allege that other dioceses have become theologically liberal. This has placed continued strain on relationships with those other dioceses. As a consequence of this some parishes outside the Sydney diocese are reluctant to invite Sydney-trained clergy to ministry positions and, conversely, clergy trained outside Sydney are rarely invited to minister within the Sydney diocese. However, many of the large and growing Evangelical churches in dioceses such as Adelaide and Perth continue to recruit some clergy and lay staff trained at Moore College.

==== Affiliation with the FIEC ====
Some Sydney Anglicans were involved in planting independent evangelical churches in other parts of Australia, now member churches of the denomination called the Fellowship of Independent Evangelical Churches (FIEC) Australia. Other Anglican churches objected to the Sydney diocese helping to plant churches outside its boundaries and the complementarian views of FIEC churches have been questioned in the secular press. Prominent Sydney clergy such as Phillip Jensen and the Moore College principal, John Woodhouse, have been on the boards of some of these churches. At the 2005 synod links between Sydney Anglicans and independent Evangelical churches were strengthened and in 2019, fourteen FIEC churches were affiliated with the Sydney diocese. Moore College describes itself as a training partner for the FIEC.

=== Relationship with the charismatic movement ===
The Sydney diocese has been less influenced by the charismatic movement than some other dioceses. While there are some parishes with strong charismatic leanings, most clergy support the doctrinal position that Christians are "filled" with the Holy Spirit at the time of conversion rather than as a separate Christian experience (as believed by some Pentecostals). As with other mainstream Christian church traditions, there is a fundamental belief in the central role of the Holy Spirit in conversion and sanctification of believers and the Fruit of the Holy Spirit is expected to be exhibited by all Christians.

=== Relationships within the diocese ===
Within the Sydney diocese there are parishes which support a range of doctrinal positions or use formal liturgical styles of worship that differ from the Evangelicalism which is dominant within the diocese. Differences can become politicised prior to the election of an archbishop with a number of clergy coalescing into like-minded groups. The two most visible groups are The Anglican Church League who support the Diocese's majority Evangelical position and Anglicans Together who are more theologically broad in their understanding of the Bible and promote a diversity of liturgical practice, which they believe to be in line with the Lambeth Quadrilateral.

=== Anglican realignment ===
The diocese has been a major force in the Anglican realignment movement, since the election of the first openly non-celibate gay bishop in the Anglican Communion, Gene Robinson, by the Episcopal Church of the United States in 2003. The Diocese of Sydney and Archbishop Peter Jensen in particular have been active in the Global Anglican Future Conference (GAFCON) and in the Global South, seeking a renewed Anglican Communion, more faithful to their understanding of Christian orthodoxy. In this way, the Diocese of Sydney supported the formation of the Anglican Church in North America as an alternative to the Episcopal Church and, in October 2009, their synod approved a resolution calling for the admission of the new province into the Anglican Communion. The resolution stated that the "Synod welcomes the creation of the Province of the Anglican Church in North America (ACNA) under the leadership of Archbishop Bob Duncan and notes the GAFCON Primates Council recognition of the ACNA as genuinely Anglican and its recommendation that Anglican Provinces affirm full communion with the ACNA. Synod therefore expresses its desire to be in full communion with the ACNA". It was also decided to seek a General Synod motion expressing the Anglican Church of Australia purpose to be in full communion with the new province.

=== Sydney diocese and politics ===
Some external commentators (including the retired American bishop John Shelby Spong, Sydney Morning Herald writer Chris McGillion and journalist Muriel Porter) have attempted to link Sydney Evangelicals to the conservative "right". While most Sydney clergy strongly support conservative positions on areas such as euthanasia, homosexuality and abortion, they also strongly support social justice issues such as protection of the rights of the underprivileged and the rights of unauthorised immigrants seeking refugee status.

This "left" wing element has a lengthy history. Archdeacon R. B. Hammond (no relation to T. C. Hammond) who was the rector of St Barnabas' Broadway operated soup kitchens during the 1930s and was then a founders of a self-help community which became known as Hammondville where unemployed people built homes, established market gardens and so found work. More lately Sir Marcus Loane was noted for his criticisms of the then Liberal-Country Party coalition governments on issues relating to Vietnamese refugees after the end of the Vietnam War, seeking the ready admission of refugees to Australia. Loane was also outspoken on issues involving uranium mining. There have been clergy willing to speak out against the more conservative policies of the Diocese of Sydney. In 2007, Keith Mascord (formerly of Mission Australia) sent an open letter to the Standing Committee, revealing disgruntlements of people within the church (both leaders and congregation members) and suggesting alternative ways forward.

The perception that Sydney Anglicans have adopted fundamentalism (see comments under Evangelical distinctives) has led to assumptions that the diocese gives implicit support for "right leaning" politicians in Australia.

In 2017, the Sydney Anglican Diocese donated $1,000,000 to the "No" campaign in response to the Australian Marriage Law Postal Survey about same sex marriage.

=== Ecumenical relations ===
While the Anglican communion's largest evangelical diocese has worked closely with its Roman Catholic counterpart on social issues for many years, the doctrinal divisions between Calvinists and Catholics are too great to be overcome by a common distaste for liberal Anglicanism. On 28 October 2009, the Diocese of Sydney's synod adopted a resolution urging all Anglicans to reject the Vatican's establishment of personal ordinariates for disaffected Anglo-Catholic traditionalists.

=== Sexual abuse, incidence and policy ===
The diocese has been disturbed by revelations of sexual abuse. Victor Roland Cole, a member of the standing committee and a former president of the Anglican Church League, was named in the Paedophile Enquiry of the Royal Commission into the New South Wales Police Service. In March 2003, Cole was defrocked on the grounds of sexual misconduct involving a 14-year-old girl. Other cases were examined by the commission but not dealt with in public hearings. In 1996, the Diocese established the Church Discipline Ordinance which provides a mechanism for allegations and complaints to be dealt with and wrongdoers to be removed from their positions in the diocese.

The diocese is committed to safe ministry and the wellbeing of all those who participate in the activities of the church and there is zero tolerance for misconduct and abuse. The Professional Standards Unit (PSU) is responsible for receiving and taking care of complaints of child abuse or sexual misconduct by clergy and church workers.

=== Women's ordination ===
One of the main differences between Sydney and the majority of other Anglican dioceses in Australia has been its unwillingness to ordain women to the priesthood (itself a term infrequently used in the diocese) or presbyterate. This issue is an indicator of Sydney's specificity in ecclesiology and theology to most other dioceses within the Anglican Communion.

The diocese has ordained women as deacons since 1989.

== See also ==
- List of Anglican churches in the Diocese of Sydney
- Sydney Missionary and Bible College
- Katoomba Christian Convention
- The Briefing
- Church Missionary Society
- Evangelical Anglicanism
- Low church
- Calvinism
- Fellowship of Confessing Anglicans
- GAFCON
