= Katoomba Christian Convention =

Religious monastery in Australia

Katoomba Christian Convention (KCC) is an interdenominational ministry providing evangelical Bible preaching to Christians. Conventions are held in KCC's 2300 seat auditorium at Katoomba, in the Blue Mountains approximately 100 km (62 mi) west of the Central Business District of Sydney, Australia.

As of 2025 present there are five conventions (many of them run over multiple identical weekends).

The site also hosts the annual CMS Summer School, organised by the Church Missionary Society which draws close to 3000 people a day during the first week of January.

== Conventions ==
There are multiple conventions including Onward (High Schoolers, Young Adults and Adults), Oxygen (Christian Leaders), NextGen (Rising Youth and Children's Ministry Leaders), One Love (Women's Conference), Basecamp (Men's Conference), KYCK (high schoolers) and KEC (all ages).

Onward was a conference across two days; its purpose was to directly address some of the pressing cultural issues facing Christians today.

Oxygen was an international gathering of Christian leaders for refreshment and encouragement.

NextGen trains youth, children's and potential "rising" ministry leaders for a lifetime of ministry.

One Love is a one-day conference to inspire women through preaching, testimony and fellowship.

Basecamp is a rest stop for men to meet together to hear from God and renew their strength.

KYCK (Katoomba Youth Christian Convention) is a three-day convention for high school aged children to grow in their faith together. It is repeated over 3 or 4 weekends with around 2000 teenagers attending each weekend.

Spark is a three-day conference for young adults (18-30), and is designed to inspire young adults in their commitment to their faith.

KEC (Katoomba Easter Convention) is a weekend of refreshment for the whole family. Includes children's programs.

It is currently directed by Jonathan Dykes.

== History ==
The first Katoomba Christian Convention was held in 1903. A history of the ministry was published to coincide with its centenary under the title "A Century Preaching Christ".

== List of Convention chairmen ==
- David Cook
- Phillip Jensen
- Alan Stewart
- Phil Wheeler (current chairman)
