= Moore Theological College =

Anglican theological college in Sydney

- Motto: Non inferiora secuti
- Motto in English: "Not pursuing lesser ideals"
- Type: Theological college
- Established: 1856
- Affiliations: Anglican Diocese of Sydney
- Principal: Mark D. Thompson
- President of Council: Kanishka Raffel
- Faculty: 20
- Students: 600
- Location: Sydney, New South Wales, Australia; 33°53′29.45″S 151°11′16.04″E
- Website: moore.edu.au

Moore Theological College, otherwise known simply as Moore College, is the theological training seminary of the Diocese of Sydney in the Anglican Church of Australia. The Anglican Archbishop of Sydney holds ex officio the presidency of the Moore Theological College Council.

The college has a strong tradition of conservative evangelical theology with an emphasis on the study of the Bible in its original languages, the use of primary sources in theology, the heritage of the Reformation and the integration of theology and ministry practice. It gives particular attention to full-time study in the context of a Christian learning community as an appropriate context for training for full-time Christian ministry, however it also offers part-time and online learning opportunities. The college trains both men and women at every level of its program. On 1 July 2021, Moore College was recognised by the Australian Government's Tertiary Education Quality and Standards Agency as an Australian University College.

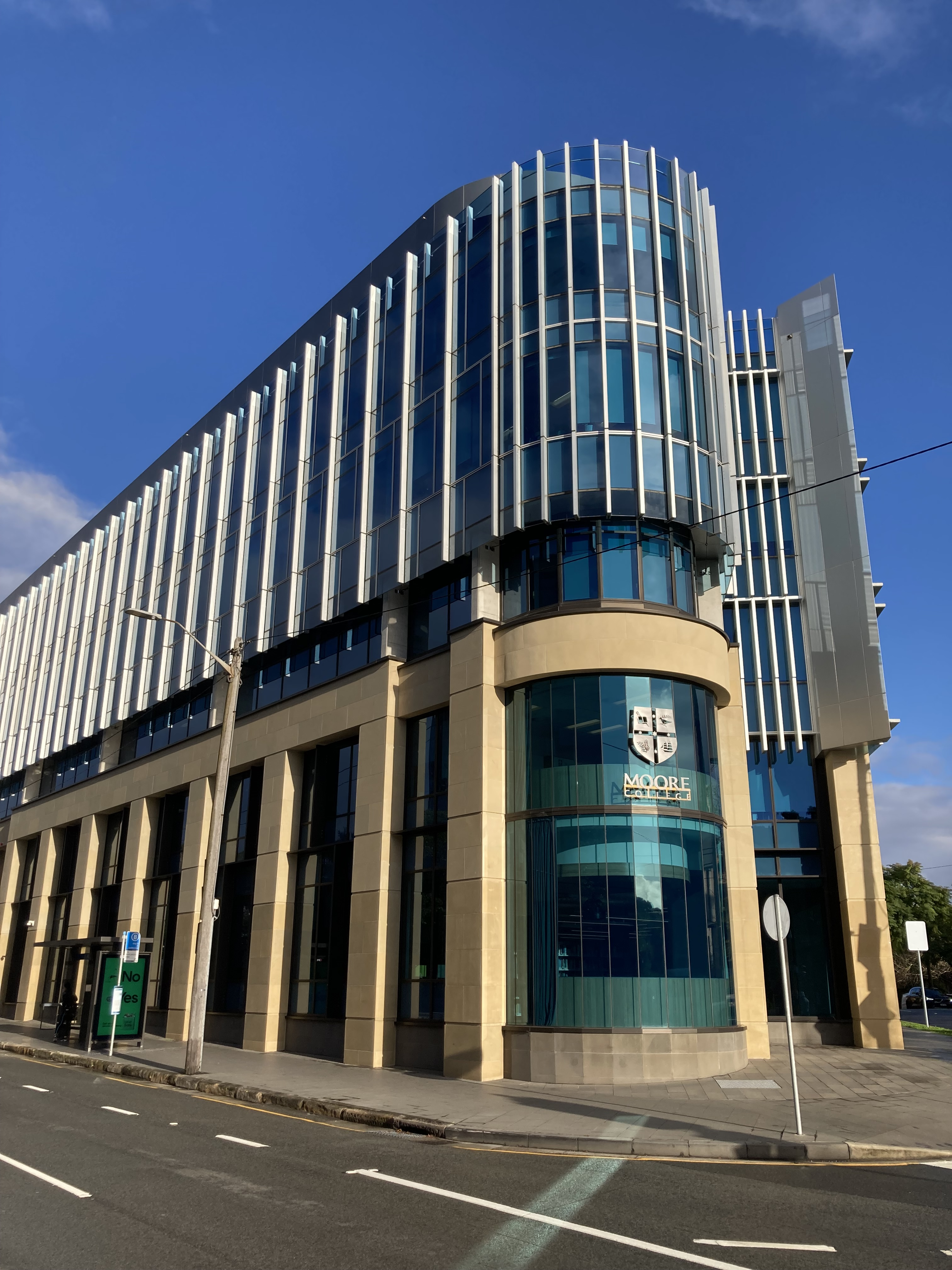
Moore Theological College

== Overview ==
The college is one of the largest Anglican seminaries in the world, with normally around 300 full-time students in its BTh and ThM programs. Over its history, it has had 13 principals and over 5000 graduates. While Anglican in foundation and governance, it has also trained Presbyterians, Baptists, Congregationalists and others who are sympathetic to the evangelical ethos and theology of the college. The college has also prepared missionaries, church planters and independent church pastors. It attracts students from around the world into its undergraduate and postgraduate programs.

While the largest group studying in its four-year full-time undergraduate program is typically those preparing for Anglican ordained ministry, Moore has also trained other Christian workers. Moore graduates also serve as school chaplains, Christian studies teachers and scripture teachers, university chaplains and staff workers, cross-cultural missionaries, social workers, community workers, hospital and nursing home/retirement village chaplains and refugee advocacy workers.

Moore College has an international reputation as the home of evangelical biblical theology. In the 1950s through to the 1970s, Donald Robinson pioneered a way of seeing how the whole Bible fits together as God's unfolding purposes. The underlying pattern of promise and fulfilment unfolds as God's gospel promise of salvation, first for the Jews and then for all the nations, is given to Abraham, partially fulfilled in Israel's history, and realised in the coming of the Christ. In the 1980s and 1990s, these ideas were developed by Robinson's pupil, Graeme Goldsworthy, in a series of books, Gospel and Kingdom, According to Plan, and Preaching the Whole Bible as Christian Scripture. Biblical theology in this mode has been characteristic of the work done at Moore College since Robinson's time as vice principal.

Robinson was also influential in developing a doctrine of the church that, in a distinctive way, resisted the strongly ecumenical tone of the mid twentieth century. A study of the terminology and contextual associations of 'church' in the Bible led Robinson to insist 'church' is a gathering, either fundamentally around Christ in heaven and instantiated throughout the world in local congregations. Each congregation is the church, and associations of congregations (denominations), while valuable, cannot attribute to themselves the identity and privileges of 'church'. Such structures exist to support the local congregation in its life as a community of faithful men and women committed to the global gospel mission. Broughton Knox gave these conclusions added theological depth in his own studies of 'fellowship' and the critical nature of 'relationship'. While this perspective was sometimes decried as 'congregationalism', both men were active throughout their lives in the work of the Diocese of Sydney, and Robinson himself became a bishop and, in time, Archbishop of Sydney. They cannot be construed as congregationalists in any pure sense of the word. However, their teaching gave a priority to the local congregation over denominational and ecumenical concerns, and located the unity of the church, something to be maintained rather than established, in the unity of the heavenly gathering around the throne of Christ.

Moore College has played a role in the shape of the Anglican Diocese of Sydney by training the vast majority of the diocese's clergy, including the last five Archbishops of Sydney, three of which were also full-time members of the college faculty. Members of the current faculty also serve in various capacities in the diocese, including its Synod, Standing Committee, the Social Issues Committee and the Sydney Diocesan Doctrine Commission.

== History ==
Thomas Hobbes Scott, the first Archdeacon of New South Wales (1825–29), shared his vision for a tertiary training college in the colony in the 1830 Report of the Church and Schools Corporation. With this vision in mind, one of the early settlers of the colony of New South Wales, Thomas Moore, made provision in his will to leave a substantial portion of his considerable fortune to found a college to train young men in 'the principles of the United Church of England and Ireland'. Moore died in 1840, but the vision was realised when Bishop Frederic Barker opened Moore College on 1 March 1856 in Moore's former home in Liverpool, New South Wales. In terms of the date of opening, at least, the college is, therefore, the third-oldest tertiary institution in Australia after the University of Sydney (1850) and the University of Melbourne (1853). It began with three students and one full-time tutor, the principal. For almost the first one hundred years of its life (1856–1953), the principals of the college came from the United Kingdom and Ireland. Marcus Loane was the first Australian-born principal of the college (1953–58). The current principal, Mark D. Thompson, took up office in May 2013.

After a theological controversy which, alongside a downturn in student enrolments, led to the dismissal of the principal of the day (T. E. Hill), the teaching activity of the college was suspended in 1888. It reopened in 1891, at the present site in Newtown adjacent to the University of Sydney. The college began to grow in student numbers and influence, particularly under the important principalships of Nathaniel Jones (1897–1911) and later T. C. Hammond (1935–1953). However, the college's most notable leader in 20th century was Broughton Knox (1959-1985). His vision, drive and shrewd management of the college saw it built into a theological college with an international reputation, a noted faculty and students spreading out from Sydney to many other parts of Australia and the globe.

The site on which the college reopened in 1891 has expanded considerably since then. Numerous adjacent buildings have been acquired or built. The Broughton Knox Teaching Centre was opened in 1994. In 2017, a major new building was opened that houses, amongst other things, the Donald Robinson Library and Marcus Loane Hall.

By 1985, the Donald Robinson Library held 90,000 books, and it has since grown to contain close to 300,000 works, including numerous manuscripts and other items of significance to Anglican, Australian and Evangelical history. In recent years, it has developed a significant body of electronic resources and a growing collection of rare books, including the Latimer Library, which was once housed in Latimer House Oxford and was acquired by the library in 2020. In the 1970s, the college established its own theological bookstore, I.M.P.A.C.T. Books, which was later renamed MooreBooks. With the advent of internet books sales, Moore Books became financially unsustainable and was closed in 2012.

Well-known Moore College theologians and writers have included Broughton Knox, Donald Robinson, Paul Barnett, Peter Jensen, Graeme Goldsworthy, Peter O'Brien, David Peterson, Barry Webb, John Woodhouse, Peter Bolt, Mark D. Thompson, Andrew G. Shead, Paul R. Williamson, Edward Loane and Tony Payne. Through the influence of Moore College, Sydney Anglicanism has maintained its distinctive Evangelical perspective within worldwide Anglicanism.

In 2021, Moore College received approval to develop new student accommodation for 91 students to replace the existing John Chapman House on the corner of City Road and Carillon Avenue in Newtown, New South Wales.

== Annual events ==
In 1977, the college began to host an annual lecture series: the Annual Moore College Lectures, which have been a showcase of leading contemporary biblical and theological scholarship, and most of which have been subsequently published. International guests who have contributed to the lecture series have included J. I. Packer, F. F. Bruce, D. A. Carson, Kenneth Kantzer, Henri Blocher, Mike Ovey, Ashley Null, Gerald Bray, Michael Horton, Kevin Vanhoozer, Carl Trueman, James Hely Hutchinson and Thomas R. Schreiner. Past and present Moore College faculty have also contributed to this lecture series.

Also in the late 1970s, an annual school of theology began to be held that enabled faculty and graduates to explore subjects of interest and importance in the wider Christian community. Subjects treated have included the church, the Spirit, the ethics of life and death, biblical theology, justification, emotions in the Christian life, a celebration of the John Calvin Quincentenary (2009), the Quincentenary of the Reformation (2017), and various books of the Bible (incl. Galatians, Exodus, and the Psalms). The school still continues as a biennial School of Biblical Theology.

== Academic and practical training for Christian ministry ==
When the College opened in 1856, the principal developed a curriculum which enabled the college to offer its own 'college certificate'. By the end of the nineteenth century, however, the college was preparing students for the Oxford and Cambridge Preliminary Examination for Holy Orders. In 1907, students began to sit examinations leading to the University of Durham's Licentiate of Theology. A long association with the Australian College of Theology began soon after, with students preparing for the ACT's Licentiate in Theology examinations, and from the 1970s until 2001, its Bachelor of Theology degree. At the same time, from 1958 to 1986, around 200 students were prepared for the external Bachelor of Divinity degree of London University, tutored by the Moore College faculty. Students received the 'Moore College Diploma', an unaccredited award, for work done during the fourth year of study.

In 1992, the four-year program of study at Moore College was redesigned as an integrated package and became the College's own Bachelor of Divinity degree. This degree and the college's three-year Bachelor of Theology degree were originally accredited by the New South Wales Government's Department of Education and Training, doing away with the need for the accreditation through the Australian College of Theology. In 2011, the college became a self-accrediting Australian Higher Education Provider, able to design and accredit its own programs of study.

The college currently offers a suite of certificates, diplomas and degrees:

- Graduate Certificate of Ministry Development—GCMD (part-time only, 0.5 year if studied full-time)
- Graduate Certificate of Anglican Ministry—GCAM (part-time only, 0.5 year if studied full-time)
- Diploma of Biblical Theology-DBT (online, 1 year full-time)
- Advanced Diploma of Bible, Mission and Ministry-AdvDipBMM (part-time, 1 year full-time)
- Bachelor of Theology-BTh (3 years full-time)
- Bachelor of Theology/Master of Theology (Coursework)—BTh/ThM (4 years full-time)
- Master of Arts in Theology-MA(Theol) (part-time, 2 years full-time)
- Master of Theology-MTh (part-time, 2 years full-time)
- Doctor of Philosophy-PhD (3-4 years full-time)

== Community courses ==
In the 1940s, under Hammond, the college began to train lay preachers within the Diocese of Sydney. This initially involved attending evening lectures by the principal, other members of the faculty and some graduates of the college. The notes from these courses formed the basis of the later correspondence course, the Sydney Preliminary Theological Certificate, which was widely used within Sydney and, in time, internationally. In the 1960s, Knox invited B. Ward Powers to develop a three-year correspondence course that would parallel the full-time course of the college for ministry candidates. Evening lectures continued alongside this correspondence course and eventually became the Diploma of Biblical Studies.

In late 2013, a significant review of the college's correspondence and evening course was undertaken. The opportunity was taken to move into the online learning space. A chief concern of the review was to keep these courses as flexible as possible to allow them to be used in less resourced places throughout the world. The 'Department of External Studies' was renamed Moore Distance, and a variety of initiatives were undertaken to explore the possibilities. In 2020, these were brought together under the heading of the P.T.C. The P.T.C. is the college's unaccredited online course of preliminary theological education.

This course is used in places around the world, in some cases becoming the basic training for church planters and pastors. These include Nigeria and India. Translation is under way into Chinese, Tamil, Hindi and Hausa languages. The college has also provided some of this information for use by other organisations such as MOCLAM and African Enterprise.

In 2017, the college began to offer an accredited entrance level diploma entirely online: the Diploma of Biblical Theology. A number of the units of this course provide for advanced standing in the college's full-time degree program.

== Centres ==
Moore College has developed four academic and ministry centres alongside its mainstream academic program:

1. the Priscilla and Aquila Centre, which promotes, resources and encourages the ministry of women in partnership with men;
2. the Centre for Christian Living, which seeks to help the general Christian public apply biblical ethics to everyday issues;
3. the Centre for Global Mission, which supports Christian organisations worldwide by providing high quality theological training resources;
4. the Centre for Ministry Development, which provides specialised continuing training and education for graduates and others involved in Christian ministry;

In addition to these centres, the John Chapman Preaching Initiative is a network of activities designed to promote excellence in biblical expository preaching.

== Principals ==
- William Hodgson (1809–1869, principal 1856–1867)
- Robert Lethbridge King (1823–1897, principal 1868–1878)
- Arthur Lukyn Williams (1853–1943, principal 1878–1884)
- Thomas Ernest Hill (1853–1923, principal 1885–1888)
- Bernard Schleicher (1859–1897, principal 1891–1897)
- Nathaniel Jones (1861–1911, principal 1897–1911)
- David John Davies (1879–1935, principal 1911–1935)
- Thomas Chatterton Hammond (1877–1961, principal 1936–1953)
- Marcus Laurence Loane (1911–2009, principal 1954–1958)
- David Broughton Knox (1916–1994, principal 1959–1985)
- Peter Frederick Jensen (1943–, principal 1985–2001)
- John William Woodhouse (1949–, principal 2002–2013)
- Mark Donald Thompson (1959–, principal 2013–present)

== Notable alumni ==
- Ian Shevill, Bishop of North Queensland and Newcastle, known abuser
- Greg Anderson, Bishop of the Northern Territory (2014–present)
- Paul Barnett, former Bishop of North Sydney (1990–2001), New Testament scholar, ancient historian
- Peter Brain, Bishop of the Anglican Diocese of Armidale (2000–2012)
- John Chapman, evangelist
- Viv Cheung, lecturer in New Testament and Greek at Youthworks College.
- Glenn Davies, Anglican Archbishop of Sydney (2013–2021)
- Chris Edwards, Bishop of Northern Sydney (2014–present)
- Kara Hartley, Archdeacon for Women in the Sydney diocese (2012-present)
- Peter Hayward, Bishop of Wollongong (2010–present)
- Peter Jensen, Anglican Archbishop of Sydney (2001–2013)
- Phillip Jensen, Dean of St Andrew's Cathedral, Sydney (2003–2014)
- Bernard Judd, Member of the Order of the British Empire (MBE) and Order of Australia (OAM).
- Gary Koo, Bishop of Western Sydney (2019–present)
- Ivan Lee, Bishop of Western Sydney (2003–2019)
- Peter Lin, Bishop of Georges River (2015–present)
- Marcus Loane, Anglican Archbishop of Sydney from 1966–1982 and Primate of Australia from 1978–1982. He was the first Australian-born Archbishop of Sydney and also the first Australian-born archbishop within the Anglican Church of Australia.
- Leon Morris, author, New Testament scholar, Principal of Ridley College, Melbourne (1964–79)
- Peter O'Brien, author, New Testament scholar, former head of New Testament at Moore
- David G. Peterson, former principal of Oak Hill Theological College, London, author and New Testament scholar
- Kanishka Raffel, Dean of Sydney (2016–2021), Archbishop of Sydney (2021–present)
- Michael Raiter, former principal of Melbourne School of Theology
- Donald Robinson, vice principal of Moore College (1959–73), Bishop in Parramatta (1973–82), Archbishop of Sydney (1982–1991)
- Stuart Robinson, Bishop of the Anglican Diocese of Canberra and Goulburn (2009–2018)
- Claire Smith, independent researcher, women’s Bible teacher and author of God’s Good Design: What the Bible really says about Men and Women (Matthias Media, 2nd ed. 2019). Pauline Communities as ‘Scholastic Communities’: A Study of the Vocabulary of ‘Teaching’ in 1 Corinthians, 1 and 2 Timothy and Titus (Wissenschaftliche Untersuchungen Zum Neuen Testament 2.Reihe: 335, Mohr Siebeck, 2012) and The Appearing of God Our Savior: A Theology of 1 and 2 Timothy and Titus (Crossway, 2025)
- Michael Stead, Bishop of South Sydney (2015–present)
- Al Stewart, former Anglican Bishop of Wollongong (2007–2010)
- Rosemary Thorburn, Senior Staffworker with the Australian Fellowship of Evangelical Students in Perth
- Jane Tooher, former Moore College lecturer in Ministry, founding Director of the Priscilla & Aquila Centre, and co-author with Graham Beynon of Embracing Complementarianism (Good Book Company, 2022)
- Dani Treweek, author of The Meaning of Singleness (IVP Academic, 2023) and founding Director of the Single Minded Ministry
- Barry Webb, Old Testament scholar, author, former head of Old Testament at Moore
- Michael Youssef, founding pastor of Church of the Apostles in Atlanta, Georgia. Founder of Leading the Way television and radio ministry
- Darrell Parker, Bishop of the Anglican Diocese of North West Australia (2023-present)

== Affiliations ==
Moore College is a member of the Australian and New Zealand Theological Society (ANZATS) and its principal sits on the Council of Deans in Theology (CDT). Moore College is also a member of the GAFCON Theological Education Network.
