= Peter Jensen (bishop) =

Australian Anglican bishop, theologian and academic (born 1943)

The Right Reverend Peter Jensen
- Archbishop of Sydney
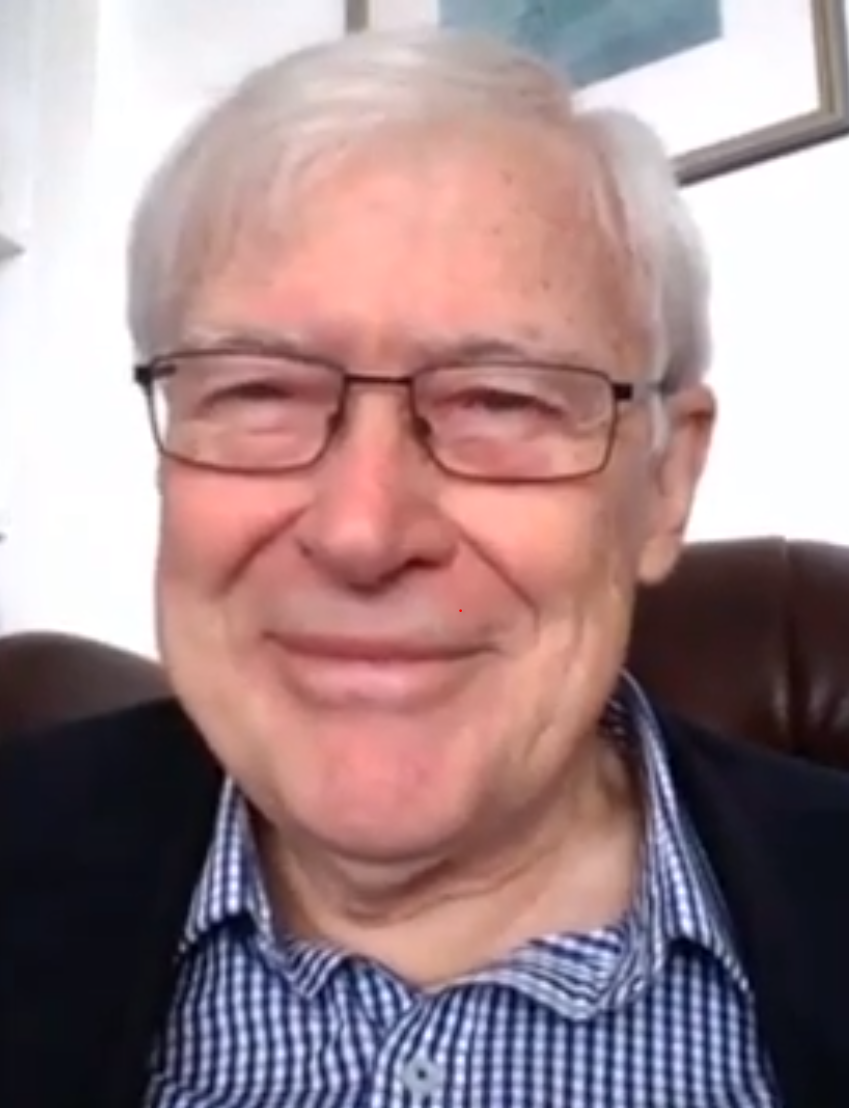
- Jensen interviewed on Anglican Unscripted
- Church: Anglican Church of Australia
- Province: New South Wales
- Diocese: Sydney
- Installed: 2001
- Term ended: 2013
- Predecessor: Harry Goodhew
- Successor: Glenn Davies
- Other post: Principal of Moore Theological College (1985–2001)

Orders
- Ordination: 1969 (deacon); 1970 (presbyter)
- Consecration: 29 June 2001

Personal details
- Born: Peter Frederick Jensen; 11 July 1943 (age 83) Sydney, New South Wales, Australia
- Denomination: Anglicanism
- Spouse: Christine
- Children: 5 including Michael Jensen
- Education: Moore Theological College; University of Sydney; University of London; University of Oxford

Peter Frederick Jensen (born 11 July 1943) is a retired Australian Anglican bishop, theologian and academic. From 1985 to 2001, he was principal of Moore Theological College. From 2001 to 2013, he was the Archbishop of Sydney and Metropolitan of the Province of New South Wales in the Anglican Church of Australia. He retired on his 70th birthday, 11 July 2013. In late 2007, Jensen was one of the founding members of the Global Anglican Future Conference (GAFCON), which he served as General Secretary. He stepped down in early 2019 and was succeeded by Benjamin Kwashi, former archbishop of Jos in Nigeria.

== Early life and education ==
Jensen was born in Sydney and educated at Bellevue Hill Public School and The Scots College. After completing his Leaving Certificate, Jensen studied law for two years and worked as an articled clerk before he moved into primary school teaching.

Jensen entered Moore Theological College in the late 1960s and won the Hey Sharp prize for coming first in the Licentiate of Theology, the standard course of study at that time. He also has a Master of Arts degree from Sydney University, a Bachelor of Divinity degree from the University of London and a Doctor of Philosophy (DPhil) degree from the University of Oxford. His 1976 master's dissertation was entitled "Calvinism and the Persecution of the Witches in England (1563–1604)" and his 1979 doctoral dissertation was entitled "The Life of Faith in the Teaching of Elizabethan Protestantism".

== Ordained ministry ==
Jensen was ordained in the Anglican Church of Australia as a deacon in 1969 and as a priest in 1970. He was a curate at St. Barnabas, Broadway, between 1969 and 1976. From 1976 to 1979, while studying for his doctorate at the University of Oxford, he was granted permission to officiate in the Diocese of Oxford, England.

From 1973 to 1976 and 1980 to 1984, he lectured in systematic and biblical theology at Moore Theological College. He was appointed Principal in 1985 and held the post until becoming a bishop in 2001. He gained a reputation as a gifted preacher and was often seen at the annual Katoomba Christian Conventions.

On 5 June 2001, Jensen became the 11th Archbishop of Sydney. He was consecrated on St Peter's Day, 29 June 2001. He called upon all churches in the Sydney diocese to aim to reach 10% of their communities by 2012. He also encouraged an unprecedented increase in church planting. Over the course of 2002–2008, 136 new congregations were started within the diocese, particularly within the Northern, Western and Wollongong regions. The number of candidates for ordination within the diocese increased from 20 to 30 per year to 40-50 by 2008.

Shortly after his appointment as Archbishop of Sydney, Jensen was accused of nepotism after nominating his brother, Phillip Jensen, as Dean of Sydney and appointing his own wife, Christine Jensen, to a lay position in a new women's ministry team. However, according to a spokesperson for Jensen, his wife was the only unpaid member of this team, and the new role was "just an extension of what she's been doing for many years, as the wife of the Moore College principal and now as the wife of the archbishop".

== Views ==
Jensen has a reputation with the Australian media for being an outspoken advocate for evangelical Christianity. He has spoken out on issues as diverse as abortion, euthanasia and embryonic stem cell research as well as on industrial relations. He has expressed his opposition to the ordination of women as priests, saying "the church is more like a family and, within the family, men are the spiritual guides", but believes women can be appointed to the diaconate, and has ordained women as such within the Sydney diocese. He is opposed to the ordination of women as bishops. In 2012 he declined to participate in the consecration of a woman bishop, Genieve Blackwell, within the Canberra-Goulburn diocese of the province of New South Wales "for reasons of conscience" and deputised the Bishop of Newcastle to do so. He has also opposed the ordination of non-celibate gay people as clergy.

In late 2007, Jensen was one of the founding members of the Global Anglican Future Conference which was held in June 2008, one month prior to the Lambeth Conference.

In a June 2012 opinion piece, Jensen argued that the acceptance of same-sex marriage is not "for the moral good". He also criticised the notion of "marriage equality", noting that society does not allow marriage between siblings or between adults and children. He also wrote a letter to parishioners of Sydney's Anglican churches in which he quoted Bible extracts from Genesis on the nature of marriage and said that "The education of children must not be distorted by the state-imposed idea that a family can be founded on the sexual union of two men or two women as a valid alternative to that of a man and a woman."

In September 2012, Jensen was a panellist on the Australian Broadcasting Corporation's Q&A program and was questioned about his views on several key issues involving the church and society. On the question of whether women should be submissive to their husbands, Jensen focused on the vows made by the husband at the time of marriage to act towards his wife in a Christ-like manner.

On the Q&A program, when questioned as to whether he supported the attitudes of the Australian Christian Lobby towards homosexuality, including a statement that it was "like smoking", Jensen said, "As far as I can see by trying to get to the facts, the lifespan of practising gays is significantly shorter than the ordinary, so-called, heterosexual man. I think that seems to be the case. Now what we need to do is to look at why this may be the case and we need to do it in a compassionate and objective way." Jensen was questioned by a young homosexual Christian man who had contemplated suicide about what he would say to young people in that position. It was stated by a panel member, journalist Anna Crean, that Jensen's position was one of influence and that people, by the process of being made to feel ostracised, were subject to "self-destruction". Jensen was then offered by a youth worker in the audience the opportunity to discuss the suffering of young homosexual people resulting from comments made by Jensen and the ACL. Jensen responded that the matter was complex and that he would like to hear the facts. He said, "It's all very well to say that what I say causes this. That to my mind is ...already facile." When questioned as to whether God might be responsible for a "gay gene", Jensen responded that God created and loves all people. He stated that same-sex attraction was not the important issue and that what he was talking about was the acting out of same-sex attraction. Jensen was asked whether he thought that his attitudes towards gay marriage and the submission of women were contributing factors in the rise of atheism. He responded that he did not believe that there had been a rise in atheism. He concluded by saying that God had revealed himself through Jesus and that through him, all people have equality.

Jensen has advocated "lay administration" in which lay people could be licensed to preside at Holy Communion services. This reflects his view that the ministry of word and sacrament belong together and, as lay people have long been permitted to preach in the Sydney diocese, it is thought they ought to be permitted to lead communion services.

== Publications ==
Jensen has written a number of books on Christian doctrine, including At the Heart of the Universe (1991) and The Revelation of God (2002). In November and December 2005 he also delivered the Australian Broadcasting Corporation's Boyer Lectures on the topic "The Future of Jesus". These lectures have subsequently been published as a book.

Jensen, as of 2014, is a co-editor of the Reformed Theological Review. He also authored the Lenten study Power and Promise released by Anglican Press Australia in late 2014.

Anglican Communion titles
Preceded by Harry Goodhew	Archbishop of Sydney; 2001–2013	Succeeded by Glenn Davies
