= Anglican Archbishop of Sydney =

Diocesan bishop of the Anglican Diocese of Sydney, Australia

Archbishop of Sydney
- Archbishopric

anglican
- Coat of arms of the Diocese
- Incumbent; Kanishka Raffel since 28 May 2021
- Style: The Most Reverend

Location
- Country: Australia
- Ecclesiastical province: New South Wales
- Residence: Sydney (formerly Bishopscourt, Darling Point (1911–2015))

Information
- First holder: William Broughton
- Denomination: Anglican
- Established: Bishopric in 1836; Archbishopric in 1897
- Diocese: Sydney
- Cathedral: St Andrew's Cathedral, Sydney

Website
- Sydney Anglicans

The Archbishop of Sydney is the diocesan bishop of the Anglican Diocese of Sydney, Australia and ex officio metropolitan bishop of the ecclesiastical Province of New South Wales.

From 1814 to 1836 the colony of New South Wales was part of the Diocese of Calcutta. In 1836, the Diocese of Australia was formed and the first bishop of Australia enthroned. By letters patent of 25 June 1847, the Diocese of Australia was split into their four dioceses, one of which being the Diocese of Sydney and its bishop the Bishop of Sydney. The Diocese of Sydney has been led by an archbishop since 1897. Since the first creation of another province within Australia in 1905, the archbishop has also been ex officio metropolitan of the province of New South Wales.

The archbishop of Sydney is currently assisted by five regional assistant bishops.

On 6 May 2021, Kanishka Raffel, Dean of St Andrew's Cathedral, Sydney since 4 February 2016, was elected as the next archbishop.

== List of Bishops and Archbishops of Sydney ==
Bishops of Sydney
No.	From	Until	Incumbent	Notes
1	1836	1853	William Broughton	Diocesan Bishop of Australia until 1847 (Note: In the Province of Calcutta.) also Primate of Australia since 1847; died in office.
2	1854	1882	Frederic Barker	Also ex officio Primate of Australia; died in office
3	1884	1889	Alfred Barry	Also ex officio Primate of Australia.
4	1890	1897	Saumarez Smith	Also ex officio Primate of Australia; became Archbishop of Sydney in 1897.
Archbishops of Sydney
4	1897	1909	Saumarez Smith	Also ex officio Primate of Australia; previously Bishop of Sydney since 1890; died in office.
5	1910	1933	John Wright	Elected Primate of Australia in 1910; died in office.
6	1933	1958	Howard Mowll	Translated from Western China; elected Primate of Australia in 1947; died in office.
7	1959	1966	Hugh Gough	Translated from Barking; elected Primate of Australia in 1959.
8	1966	1982	Marcus Loane	Previously coadjutor bishop of Sydney; elected Primate of Australia in 1978; knighted in 1976.
9	1982	1993	Donald Robinson	Translated from Parramatta.
10	1993	2001	Harry Goodhew	Translated from Wollongong.
11	2001	2013	Peter Jensen	Previously Principal of Moore Theological College
12	2013	2021	Glenn Davies	Translated from North Sydney. Installed 23 August 2013.
12	2021	present	Kanishka Raffel	Elected 6 May 2021 and installed 28 May 2021. Formerly Dean of Sydney (2016–2021).
