= Marcus Loane =

Australian Anglican Archbishop (1911–2009)

The Most Reverend Sir Marcus Loane KBE
- Archbishop of Sydney
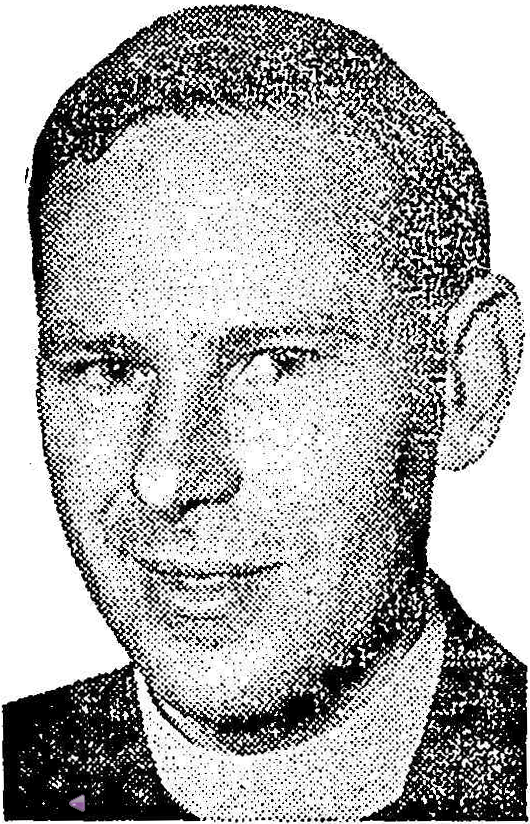
- Loane in 1953
- Church: Anglican Church of Australia
- Province: New South Wales
- Diocese: Sydney
- In office: 1966 to 1982
- Other post: Primate of Australia (1977-1982)

Orders
- Ordination: 1935
- Consecration: c. 1958

Personal details
- Born: Marcus Lawrence Loane; 14 October 1911 Tasmania, Australia
- Died: 14 April 2009 (aged 97) Sydney, New South Wales, Australia
- Spouse: Patricia (m. 1937)
- Children: 4
- Education: University of Sydney; Moore Theological College
- Coat of arms

The Most Reverend Sir Marcus Lawrence Loane KBE (14 October 1911 – 14 April 2009) was an Australian Anglican bishop, the Archbishop of Sydney from 1966 to 1982 and Primate of Australia from 1977 to 1982. He was the first Australian-born Archbishop of Sydney and also the first Australian-born archbishop in the Anglican Church of Australia.

Loane was a prolific author, and his works include several biographies.

== Early life ==
Loane was born on 14 October 1911 in Tasmania. His family moved to north Queensland, then to Sydney. He studied at the University of Sydney and then entered Moore Theological College, an Anglican conservative evangelical seminary, to train for ordination.

== Ordained ministry ==
In 1935, Loane was ordained in the Church of England in Australia (the church was renamed the Anglican Church of Australia in 1981). He spent nearly all his ministry in the Anglican Diocese of Sydney except for two years during World War II as an army chaplain in New Guinea. After the war he was appointed vice-principal and then principal of Moore Theological College. In 1958, he was appointed a coadjutor (assistant) bishop in the diocese.

== Personal life ==
Loane married Patricia Knox on 31 December 1937. She was the daughter of the rector of St Paul's, Chatswood. Together, they had four children; Mary, Robert, David and Winsome. They celebrated 71 years of marriage in 2008.

Loane died in Sydney on 14 April 2009 at the age of 97.

== Honours ==
In the 1976 New Year Honours, he was appointed a Knight Commander of the Order of the British Empire (KBE). He was also appointed Chaplain of the Venerable Order of Saint John on 5 December 1978.

== Works ==
Biblical and doctrinal:

- Infant baptism and immersion : what the Bible teaches, (1941)
- Vox Crucis, or, Echoes from Calvary, (1944)
- Mary of Bethany, (1949)
- The man of sorrows, (1953)
- The crown of thorns, (1954)
- The Voice of the Cross, (1956)
- The Prince of Life, etc. (Studies dealing ... with the Resurrection and Ascension of our Lord Jesus Christ), (1947)
- Key-texts in the Epistle to the Hebrews, (1961)
- Then came Jesus : Studies in Luke 24 and John 20, (1962)
- It is the Lord. (1965)
- Do you now believe? ... A short introduction to Christian doctrine based on the Apostles' Creed, (1966)
- The hope of glory: an exposition of the eighth chapter in the 'Epistle to the Romans', (1968) ISBN 0-340-02404-6
- This surpassing excellence. Textual studies in the Epistles to the Churches of Galatia and Philippi, (1969) ISBN 0-207-95156-X
- By Faith We Stand - key texts in 2 Corinthians, (1971) ISBN 0-207-12221-0
- Grace and the Gentiles : expository studies in six Pauline Letters, (1981) ISBN 0-85151-327-1
- Godliness and contentment : studies in the pastoral epistles, (1982) ISBN 0-8010-5619-5
- In exile on Patmos : studies in the Gospel, First Epistle and Apocalypse of St John the Divine, (1993) ISBN 0-86408-161-8
- From Bethlehem to Olivet, (1998) ISBN 0-86408-216-9
- His name was Jesus, (1999)
- Genesis and the Patriarchs, (2000)
- This Same Jesus - Studies in the life of Jesus

Biographical and historical:

- Handley Carr Glyn Moule 1841-1920, (1947)
- Oxford and the Evangelical Succession, (1951)
- Cambridge and the Evangelical Succession, (1952)
- Masters Of The English Reformation, Church Society (1954) & Banner of Truth Trust (2005), ISBN 0-85151-910-5
- A Centenary History of Moore Theological College, (1955)
- Archbishop Mowll : the biography of Howard West Kilvinton Mowll, Archbishop of Sydney and Primate of Australia, (1960)
- Makers of Religious Freedom in the Seventeenth Century, (1960)
- Sons of the Covenant, (1963)
- The Story of the China Inland Mission, (1965)
- Makers of our heritage. A study of four Evangelical leaders, (1967)
- John the Baptist as witness and martyr, (1968) ISBN 0-551-00203-4
- They were pilgrims, (1970) ISBN 0-207-12092-7, & Banner of Truth Trust (2006) ISBN 0-85151-928-8
- Pioneers of the Reformation in England, (1964) ISBN 0-85190-056-9
- Amazing grace: some aspects and insights in the life of the apostle Paul, (1972) ISBN 0-551-05169-8
- John Charles Ryle, 1816-1900, (1983) ISBN 0-340-34251-X
- Three faithful servants, (1991) ISBN 0-86408-138-3
- Loane, Marcus L. (1994). Broughton Knox : principal of Moore College, 1959-1985. Peter F. Jensen. Newtown, NSW: Moore Theological College. ISBN 0-909443-21-1. OCLC 33038341.
