= Peter Lin (bishop) =

Australian Anglican bishop (born 1967)

The Right Reverend Peter Lin
- Bishop of South Western Sydney
- Church: Anglican Church of Australia
- Province: Province of New South Wales
- Diocese: Diocese of Sydney
- In office: May 2015 to present

Orders
- Consecration: 30 May 2015 by Glenn Davies

Personal details
- Born: Peter Robert Lin; 1967/1968 (aged 58–59)
- Denomination: Anglicanism
- Spouse: Isobel
- Children: 3

Peter Robert Lin (born 1967) is an Australian Anglican bishop. Since May 2015, he has been Bishop of South Western Sydney (known as "Bishop of Georges River" between 2015 and 2021), an assistant bishop in the Diocese of Sydney. He was consecrated a bishop on 30 May 2015 by Glenn Davies, the Archbishop of Sydney.

Lin is the second bishop in the Anglican Church of Australia to be of Chinese descent; the first was Ivan Lee.

== Education ==
Lin finished degrees at Sydney and Macquarie Universities and graduated from Moore College.

== Views ==
In 2018, Julia Baird reported that Lin asked for more time to consider a motion that allowed bishops to consider allowing women who were emotionally or physically abused the ability to remarry. He was reported to have said that he had counselled many women who experienced these things and chose not to divorce, and that "I tell these women that they are heroes of the faith". After this statement Baird witnessed women in the crowd weeping in response.

Lin views the difficulties in finding senior ministers in the Sydney Anglican system is caused by assistant ministers who "feel they can still be doing significant ministry without the hassles or responsibilities of being a rector", and that there are not enough people being trained for ministry.

Anglican Communion titles
Preceded by Peter Tasker	Bishop of South Western Sydney (as Bishop of Georges River 2015–2021); 2015 to present	Incumbent
