= Kanishka Raffel =

British Anglican priest in Australia (born 1964)

The Most Reverend Kanishka Raffel
- Archbishop of Sydney
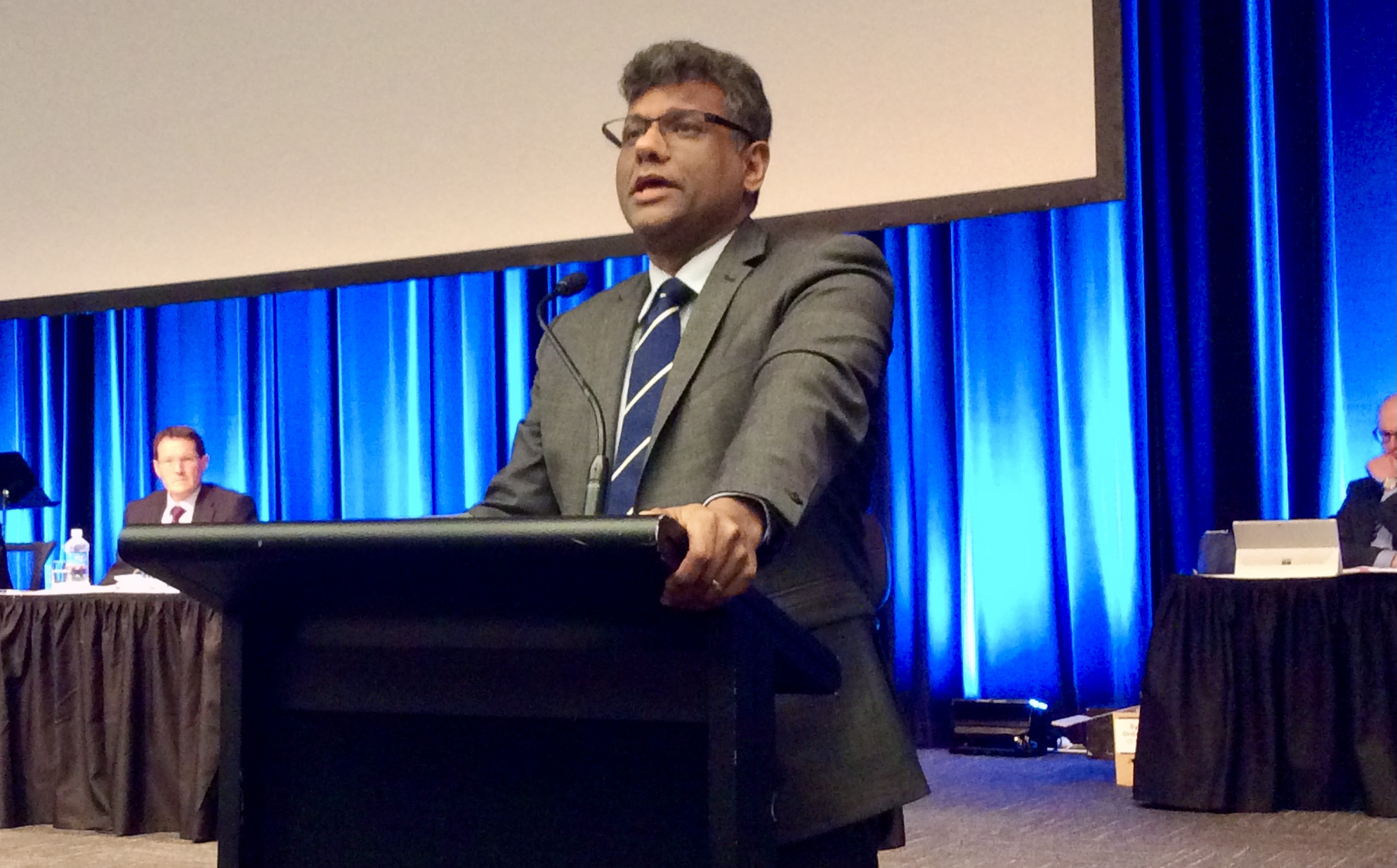
- Raffel in 2017
- Church: Anglican Church of Australia
- Province: New South Wales
- Diocese: Sydney
- Elected: 6 May 2021
- Installed: 28 May 2021
- Predecessor: Glenn Davies
- Previous post: Dean of Sydney (4 February 2016 – 28 May 2021)

Orders
- Ordination: 1996 (as deacon) by Harry Goodhew; 1996 (as priest) by George Browning
- Consecration: 28 May 2021 by Geoffrey Smith

Personal details
- Born: Kanishka de Silva Raffel; 6 November 1964 (age 62) London, United Kingdom
- Spouse: Cailey
- Children: 2
- Education: University of Sydney (BA (Hons), LLB); Moore Theological College (BD Hons, Dip Min, MA (Theology))

Kanishka de Silva Raffel (born 6 November 1964) is a British-born Australian Anglican bishop of Sri Lankan descent, who has served as the Anglican Archbishop of Sydney since 28 May 2021. He previously served as the 12th Dean of St Andrew's Cathedral, Sydney from 4 February 2016 until his installation as archbishop.

== Early life and education ==
Raffel was born on 6 November 1964 in London, England, to Sri Lankan parents. His father, Lorenz Raffel, was a tea plantation supervisor, and his mother, Lilamani, was a doctor. They moved to Canada for a brief period but found it too cold and emigrated to Australia in 1972.

Raffel's father died of a heart attack after just 6 months' residence in Australia.

Raffel received his secondary education at the co-educational state funded Carlingford High School.

Raised by his mother as a Buddhist, Raffel was given by a friend, Andrew Shead, a copy of the Gospel of John when in the third year of his degree course. At the age of 21, he was convinced by the words of Jesus in John's Gospel: "No one can come to me unless the Father who sent me draws them, and I will raise them up at the last day" (John 6:44).

Raffel graduated from the University of Sydney with honours in English literature in 1986 and in Law in 1989. For two and a half years after graduating, Raffel practised law at Blake Dawson Waldron, which became Ashurst LLP. He then trained at Moore Theological College, graduating in 1996 as a Bachelor of Divinity with a Diploma of Ministry.

== Ordained ministry ==
Raffel was ordained deacon in 1996 in the Anglican Diocese of Sydney, and priest in 1996 in the Anglican Diocese of Canberra and Goulburn. He served at St Matthew's Church, Wanniassa from 1996 to 1999, and then moved to the Anglican Diocese of Perth where he served for 16 years (1999-2016) as rector of St Matthew's Church, Shenton Park. He obtained a Master of Arts degree in Theology from Moore Theological College in 2010.

=== Dean of Sydney ===
Raffel was appointed Dean of St Andrew's Cathedral and was installed there on 4 February 2016. He was the first person from a non-European background to hold the position.

As Dean, Raffel was an active spokesman for Christianity, appearing on ABC radio and on ABC TV's The Drum. In 2021 he led the Sydney diocese's service commemorating the death of Prince Philip, Duke of Edinburgh.

=== Archbishop of Sydney ===
As early as 2019, the Sydney Morning Herald had described Raffel as one of the "leading contenders" for the position of Anglican Archbishop of Sydney. In 2021, he was announced as one of four nominees to replace Glenn Davies, alongside three bishops: the Bishop of North Sydney Chris Edwards, the Bishop of Wollongong Peter Hayward, and the Bishop of South Sydney Michael Stead. On 6 May 2021, Raffel was elected to the position, at a special election synod.

On 28 May 2021, Raffel was consecrated a bishop by Geoffrey Smith, and installed as archbishop in Sydney's St Andrew's Cathedral. He is the first person from a non-European background to hold the diocesan bishop's position.

== Other roles ==
Raffel holds a number of other roles, including:

- Member of the General Synod Standing Committee.
- Board Member of GAFCON Australia.
- Council Member of the Gospel Coalition Australia
- Trustee of the Anglican Relief and Development Fund.
- Trustee of Trinity Theological College, Perth.
- President of the Church Missionary Society - Australia

== Personal life ==
Raffel is married to Cailey, and has two daughters.

Anglican Communion titles
Preceded by Glenn Davies	Archbishop of Sydney; 2021–present	Incumbent
Preceded by Phillip Jensen	Dean of Sydney; 2016–2021	Succeeded by Sandy Grant
