= Bishop of the Northern Region =

Bishop of (the) North(ern) (Region) may refer to:

- Bishop of the Northern Region, an assistant bishop in the Anglican Diocese of Sydney
- Bishop of the Northern Region, an assistant bishop in the Anglican Diocese of Brisbane
- Bishop of the Northern Region, an assistant bishop in the Anglican Diocese of Melbourne
- Bishop of the Northern Region, an assistant bishop in the Anglican Diocese of Perth
