= The Illawarra Grammar School =

Location
- 10–12 Western Avenue, Mangerton, Wollongong, New South Wales; 2500; Australia; 34°25′38″S 150°52′10″E

Information
- Type: Independent comprehensive co-educational early learning, primary and secondary day school
- Motto: Latin: De virtute in virtutem (From Strength to Strength)
- Denomination: Anglican
- Opened: 3 February 1959; 67 years ago
- Founder: Bishop Gordon Begbie
- Educational authority: New South Wales Department of Education
- Head of school: Julie Greenhalgh
- Years: Early learning and Kindergarten to Year 12
- Enrolment: 1011
- Website: tigs.nsw.edu.au

The Illawarra Grammar School, abbreviated as TIGS or Illawarra Grammar, is an independent Anglican comprehensive co-educational early learning, primary and secondary day school, located at Mangerton in the Illawarra region of New South Wales, Australia. The school caters for approximately 1,100 students from early learning to Year 12. TIGS offers an early learning program for students between 3 and 5 years of age called TIGS Prep (previously titled, The Piper Centre). The School employs 97 teaching staff and 48 non-teaching staff. A total enrolment of 778 students consists of 407 boys and 371 girls as of 2019.

== History ==
The Illawarra Grammar School was founded in 1958 by Bishop Gordon Begbie and dedicated parents. On its opening day, 3 February 1958, the first headmaster, Rev. Richard Bosanquet and two staff, welcomed 28 students into the school. In 1975, the school became co-educational when it amalgamated with SCEGGS 'Gleniffer Brae'. In 2009 TIGS celebrated the Golden Jubilee of its founding.

At the end of 2018, TIGS announced the appointment of the eighth Principal, Judith Nealy, as the successor for long-serving Headmaster, Stephen Kinsella. In 2024, Dr Julie Greenhalgh commenced as the ninth Principal.

== Notable alumni ==
- Meganne Christian (2004) – member of the 2022 European Space Agency Astronaut Group
- Robert Hurley (2006) – member of the Australian swimming team
- David McKeon (2010) – competed in the 2012 London Olympic Games for the Australian swimming team
- Emma McKeon (2012) – won four gold medals from the 2020 Summer Olympics
- Jarrod Poort (2012) – competed in the 2012 Summer Olympics in London and 2016 Summer Olympics in Rio for the Australian swimming team.
- Margaux Chauvet (2017) - a soccer player who plays for Sydney FC.

== See also ==
- List of Anglican schools in New South Wales
- List of schools in Illawarra and the South East
- Anglican education in Australia
