= Jose de Segovia =

José de Segovia may refer to:

- José Antonio de Segovia, (born 1982), Spanish cyclist
- Jose de Segovia (journalist), (born 1964), Spanish journalist, teacher and theologian
