= James Ruse Agricultural High School =

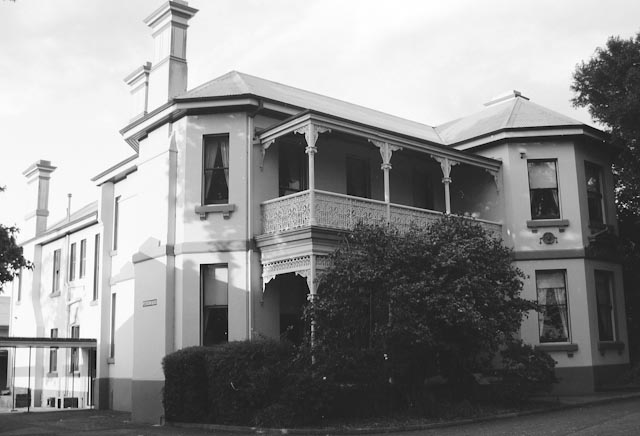
- Located at James Ruse Agricultural High School, this house was built for the Felton family in 1885 on their farming property; pictured in 1999.

Location
- Carlingford, Sydney, New South Wales; Australia; 33°46′52″S 151°2′31″E

Information
- Other name: Ruse, JR
- Type: Government co-educational academically selective and specialist secondary day school
- Motto: Latin: Gesta Non Verba (Deeds not words)
- Established: 1959; 67 years ago
- Educational authority: NSW Department of Education
- Specialist: Agricultural school
- Principal: Matthew Dopierala
- Employees: 80
- Years: 7–12
- Enrolment: ~857 (2026)
- Campus: Suburban
- Colours: Bottle green, gold
- Website: jamesruse-h.schools.nsw.gov.au

James Ruse Agricultural High School (colloquially known as Ruse or JR) is a government co-educational academically selective and specialist secondary day school, located in the Sydney suburb of Carlingford, New South Wales, Australia. The school is also one of four New South Wales Government agricultural high schools.

The school ranked first among all New South Wales high schools in the Higher School Certificate for 27 consecutive years from 1996 to 2022, and has placed second behind North Sydney Boys High School since 2023. It has consistently ranked first nationally in the national government NAPLAN tests since their introduction.

As of 2025, there are approximately 857 students enrolled at James Ruse in Year 7 through to Year 12.James Ruse is an academically selective high school; admission to James Ruse in Year 7 is only through the Selective High Schools Test, which is open to all Year 6 NSW students. A small number of students from other high schools are accepted in Year 8, 9, 10 and 11, through application made directly to the school. In 2025, approximately 97% of the student population came from a language background other than English. The school has an Index of Community Socio-Educational Advantage (ICESA) of 1222, with the school sitting in the 99th percentile compared to the national average of 1000.

== History ==
In 1949 the main part of the school grounds was purchased by the NSW Government for the purpose of agricultural education. The school that commenced on this site in 1956 was an annexe of Carlingford District Rural School with Charles Mullavey as the Master in Charge. At that time the school consisted of a wooden, five-room classroom block, a small staff-room and ablution facilities. By the start of 1958 the school was independent of Carlingford District Rural School and was called the "Carlingford Junior Agricultural High School" (reflecting that students could only undertake the first three years of secondary education at the school).

In 1959 the name of the school was changed to "Carlingford Agricultural High School" (to reflect its new full high school status – although there were no actual Fourth and Fifth Year classes at that time). The first Headmaster, James C. Hoskin, and his Deputy Headmaster, Charles Mullavey, commenced duties at the start of that year and in April, the name of the school changed again - this time to "James Ruse Agricultural High School".

When James Hoskin was studying Agriculture at University, he had become interested in James Ruse due to his significance in the early development of agriculture in Australia, and also because "both Ruse and I [Hoskin] are of Cornish extraction". Hoskin questioned the name of the school (Carlingford Agricultural High School) as the school was not serving just the Carlingford area. In April 1959, Hoskin put forward a proposal to the NSW Department of Education outlining two new names for the school: Sydney Agricultural High School and Ruse Agricultural High School; eventually, the Department agreed to a modification of the latter. The school was named to honour prominent late farmer James Ruse.

Hoskin soon became synonymous with the school, as he served as headmaster until his retirement aged 65 in 1978. During this time, the school became established as one of the few public schools that were selective; initially because of its agricultural speciality, then for its reputation as a quality school. For his efforts, Hoskin was awarded the Queen's Silver Jubilee Medal in 1977 and the Order of Australia for Services to Education in 1990.

The first group of students to complete the full five years of secondary education at the new high school sat for the Leaving Certificate in 1961. Most of these boys were part of the initial enrolment of 1st Year pupils at the Felton Rd. site, in 1957, Harry Fox Wilson was among them. James Ruse AHS was originally a boys only school, but gradually became co-educational after an initial intake of 24 female students into Year 11 in 1977.

Since the mid-1990s, James Ruse has undergone an extensive building works program funded by both parents of students and the State and Federal Governments. 1997 saw the completion of Stage 1 of this program (encompassing a new Library block and English classrooms which replaced the old Anderson building, a new block containing Art and HSIE classrooms, the integration of the existing Powe block and the former library into a science block, and the installation of an elevator in the Perrau block to improve wheelchair accessibility).

In 2000, Stage 2 of the program began with the first building (a 180-seat lecture theatre) completed in early 2001. The Schofield block became part of the program in 2002 after the building was damaged by fires. During the next two years the old Technology Block and the Francis block were demolished due to a white ant infestation, with both blocks being rebuilt and refurnished in 2004. The final stage of the works were underway at the time of the departure of Principal Michael Quinlan, who retired in 2006 after having been Principal since 1992. These developments (including a new music block) continued with the guidance of the new principal, Larissa Treskin.

In early 2020, the Powe Science block opened after extensive renovations.

== Principals ==
The following individuals have served as Principal of James Ruse Agricultural High School:

Ordinal	Officeholder	Term start	Term end	Time in office	Notes
1	James C. Hoskin	1959	1978	18–19 years	
2	A.J. Gilmour	1979	1982	2–3 years	
3	Andrew Watson	1982	1988	5–6 years	
4	Edward (Ted) Clarke	1989	1991	1–2 years	
5	Michael Quinlan	1992	2006	13–14 years	
6	Larissa Treskin	2007	2012	4–5 years	
7	Megan Connors	2013	2018	4–5 years	
8	Rachel Powell	2019	2024	4–5 years	
9	Matthew Dopierala	2024	-	1–2 years	

== Academic results ==
James Ruse has placed first nationally and annually in the NAPLAN tests since its inception. Between 1996 and 2022, the school recorded the highest percentage of distinguished achievers in the Higher School Certificate (HSC), with a median Universities Admission Index (UAI) of 99.55 in 2004, and 99.20 in 2005 and 2006. The school subsequently ranked second in the HSC behind North Sydney Boys High School in 2023, achieving the same rank in 2024 and 2025.

Out of the approximately 140 placement offers sent to Year 7 students by the school, it was reported in 2021 that nearly a third of students declined. While parents are not required to provide a reason for their choice, the perception of an excessively competitive nature within the school, which former principal Powell labelled a "stereotype that Ruse is an ATAR factory", was concluded to be a factor by the school. Powell stated that this is evidence "people don’t really understand Ruse". Further reasons for decisions against accepting placement offers included scholarships to private schools requiring deposits before selective school offers.

== Extracurricular activities ==
The school provides extracurricular and competitive activities, as well as volunteering and fundraising activities, such as the World's Greatest Shave and the 40 Hour Famine, alongside chapters of Interact and Amnesty International.

=== Sport ===
The school holds annual sporting carnivals, including the Swimming, Cross-Country and Athletics Carnivals, where students can compete for participation in wider regional competitions, from Zone and Area carnivals to the CHS (Combined High Schools) competition for the top school teams and competitors in NSW. James Ruse participates in tournaments and competitions with schools in surrounding areas. These include the following activities.

- Quad-School Tournament; initiated in 2011, in which the school competes against Baulkham Hills High School, Girraween High School, and as of 2013, Penrith High School in touch football, soccer, basketball, and volleyball over the course of one day.
- Year 7 Gala Day; against Cumberland High School
- Year 8 Farmers' Cup; against Muirfield High School
- Zone, Regional, or State Representative Teams

There are also many competitive sporting teams, where students compete against other schools in the area, state, or country. Some teams have had the opportunity to compete against sporting teams from overseas.

- Knockout Regional Teams (Baseball, Basketball, Hockey, Netball, Soccer, Table Tennis, Touch Football, Tennis, Volleyball)
- Summer Grade Sport
- Winter Grade Sport
- Regional Championship Sports
- Davidson Shield Cricket Team
- CHS Pentathlon
- Australian International Junior Circuit (ITTF) Table Tennis Team

=== James Ruse Agricultural High School Army Cadet Unit (JRAHSACU) ===
The Australian Army Cadets (AAC) operates a school-based unit at James Ruse for students of the school. The unit was established in 1960, and is the largest extra-curricular activity offered at the school, representing over a third of the students at approximately 300 participants.

=== Public competitions and other student groups ===
- Informatics Team (International team representatives in 2005–2006, 2008–2015, 2019, 2022–2023).
- Physics Olympiad Team (International team representatives in 1990, 2004–2008, 2010–2011, 2015–2017, 2019, 2021–2024, 2026)
- Chemistry Olympiad Team (International team representatives in 2000–2005, 2008–2012, 2015–2022, 2025–2026)
- Biology Olympiad Team (International team representatives in 2000–2003, 2005–2008, 2010, 2016, 2019, 2021,2025)
- Earth Science Olympiad Team (International team representatives in 2015–2016, 2018, 2020–2023, 2026)
- Junior Science Olympiad Team (International team representatives in 2022–2023, 2025)
- Mathematics Olympiad Team (International team representatives in 1985–1986, 1997–2000, 2003–2017, 2019–2024).

=== Student Representative Council (SRC) ===
The school's Student Representative Council was inaugurated in 1960, making it among the first high schools in New South Wales to have such a body. Each year, each roll class elects two representatives who represent it on the SRC, with the exception of Year 11 classes who elect one representative for each English class. The SRC as a whole elect a student executive body, which consists of a President, Vice-President, Treasurer, Secretary, and Minutes Secretary, by a system first inaugurated in 1990. Through the SRC, students have some representation on the school steering committees (along with parents and staff), and also play a minor role in decision-making processes relating to curriculum, building plans, and resource allocation. This group is led by five, year 11 student executives.

The council is elected through a first-past-the-post voting system, with a voting card for male and female respectively. This replaced the instant runoff system, which caused gender imbalances in representation. Year Advisors and the school's teacher executives have final oversight over the representatives in this body, and have the power to veto any candidate without their knowledge, giving the position to the candidate with the next highest number of votes.

== Agriculture ==
The school teaches agriculture as a compulsory subject from years 7 to 10. Formerly it was also compulsory in Year 11 (with students taking an accelerated version of the HSC course to allow completion within one year). However, following the introduction of a new HSC curriculum by the Board of Studies in 2001, the school made Year 11 optional (with the decision supported by a survey among students). Agriculture is a significant part of the school's curriculum, with students undergoing study of the subject both on and off-site, where students study and visit agricultural enterprises both in the Greater Sydney region, with visits to regional horticultural farming enterprises such as the Sydney Royal Easter Show and farms in Bathurst and in Gloucester. There is also great involvement in with other agricultural schools, with the school linked with Yanco Agricultural High School, and previous Head Teacher of Agriculture, Lisle Brown, being the co-author of the Dynamic Agriculture textbook series, which is extensively used in agriculture in Australian schools.

The school leases approximately ten hectares of land from the neighbouring electricity sub-station for use in practical agriculture lessons. The farm land is situated north of the general school buildings, extending north to Lynch Close and east to Jenkins Road. The farm is arranged to include a vegetable garden, a classroom, a glasshouse and nursery, a greenhouse, an orchard, experimental plots, an area for field crops and a livestock section, among others. It also contains some riparian land which is currently being monitored and undergoing rehabilitation to its native state by the Streamwatch group (currently working as part of Sydney Water Streamwatch).

A significant amount of the farm land is set aside for student plots. Part of practical agriculture lessons involves students growing and maintaining their own crops. Mature crops in the students' assigned plots of land are then the students' to take home. In addition to its use for educational purposes, the farm also supplies a wide variety of agricultural produce including: Cattle – Angus stud, paraded annually at the Castle Hill Show by the Cattle Group, and sold at Camden Sales yard; Sheep – First-cross Ewes & Prime Lambs; Eggs – Free-range eggs; Poultry Meat – Broilers raised and sold onsite, Oranges – Washington Navel; Peaches – Flordagold and Sherman's Red varieties; Sweet Corn – Shimmer variety; James Ruse Gold Rose – A privately crossbred rose variety the rights were donated to the school in 1999 in celebration of its 40 years of teaching; Apiary – Honey sold on-site in jars; and Macadamia Nuts. Various groups of students have been set up to look after these, such as the Poultry Squad and a Weather Watcher group to maintain farm records. In the past, the farm also housed Merino-Border Leicester sheep, named the Sharlea Sheep. It was replaced by the Aquaculture venture, silver perch and a crayfish growing system. Now, some students also participate in making peach jam and sorbet after the peach harvest.

== Campus ==
The school is situated in Carlingford, a suburb of north-western Sydney. Its main entrance is located on the southwest corner of the school, with a number of smaller entrances on its southern and western boundaries. The campus is built around a main quadrangle, another cluster of buildings around a smaller quadrangle, with an oval, sporting facilities and the farm to the north of these.

=== Barrengarry House ===
Barrengarry House, the school's main administration block, is located near the southwest entrance of the school, adjoining the Senior Common Room and the Library and housing the offices of the principal, deputy principals, head teacher of administration and the administration staff on the lower floor, and the counsellor's office, uniform shop and function rooms on the upper floor. It was originally the home and property of the Felton family, and was built in 1885, with the architect thought to have been Charles Slatyer. The block adjoins a roadway of the same name, both of which are named after the Feltons' estate.

=== J.C. Hoskin Auditorium ===
More commonly known as the "school hall", the J.C. Hoskin Auditorium, named after the school's founding principal (see history above), is used as a multi-purpose facility. Along with holding important school assemblies, concerts and the school musical, the hall is also used for examinations (primarily government and senior exams) and it was used for PE classes in the past—this function was largely removed with the construction of the school's new gymnasium in 2017. Ceremonies which celebrate the school's highest achievers are also held annually in the Auditorium.

=== Lecture Theatre ===
The MA Canty Lecture Theatre was opened in 2001 and is located south of T-Block and west of A-Block.

=== Library Block ===
The Library Block (or "L-Block") was built in 1997 and opened by then NSW Premier Bob Carr as part of the school's building works program, to provide a larger, and more modern and well-equipped library to replace the smaller Shearman Block (now the school's Music block). The block is a two-storey building, with the library occupying the top floor and English classrooms and offices on the bottom floor.

=== Technology Block ===
The Technology Block (or "T-Block") is a recent addition to the school campus along with the new Canteen Block, with construction finished in 2005. The wing is a two-storey building with a mix of classrooms, workshops and modern computer labs, and overlooks the gymnasium on its northern side. It is connected to A-Block, which is located on the South of T-Block.

=== Art Block ===
The Art Block (or "A-Block") is a two storey facility that contains a 5 classrooms. On the lower floor resides the Creative and Performing Arts staffroom, two art classrooms and an art storage room with kilns and other art supplies. On the upper floor are 3 classrooms that are usually used for HSIE lessons such as History, Geography, Commerce and Economics. Due to the sloped nature of the campus, the upper floor adjoins to the first floor of Cameron Block and the lower floor adjoins to the upper floor of the Technology Block.

=== Cameron Block ===
The Cameron Block (or "C-Block") is a three-storey building with a variety of classrooms, science labs, computer rooms and lockers. The second floor is primarily used for Mathematics lessons, and the Mathematics staffroom is located on the second floor accordingly. On the first floor, rooms C1.1 and C1.2 are science labs, whilst C1.4 and C1.5 are primarily used for HSIE lessons. There is also a Drama Room (C1.3) which contains a stage, as well as a hobbit hole with costumes and other drama-related objects.

=== Powe Block ===
The Powe Block (or "P-Block") is a two-storey building connecting L-Block and C-Block which houses half of the school's laboratories. It has 4 classrooms. Most science lessons are held in this building and the science faculty staff room is located on the first floor. Its second storey was constructed in 2012.

=== W-Block ===
W-block is a set of 4 separate single-storey buildings, Mills Block, Best Block, Shearman Block, and Schofield Block. One building contains W1.1 (science lab) and W1.2 (classroom). W1.7 is a band room, where most before and after school bands are held. W1.3 is partitioned into 5-6 music/practice rooms and one larger classroom. The W-block building nearest to the quadrangle houses W1.5 (classroom), W1.6 (classroom), the senior study, and the English staffroom.

=== F-Block ===
F-Block is a single storey building with two adjoining rooms that houses agriculture lessons. The farm manager utilises this block. It is located on the farm besides the tool shed and behind the basketball courts, and overlooks the peach/orange orchard, as well as being adjacent to the farm, where students complete their practical Agriculture lessons.

=== Bishop Block ===
Bishop Block is named after John Bishop. It is a 2 storey building adjacent to the canteen sails. The bottom floor is used as a sports equipment storeroom and the second floor is B2.1, a classroom often used for Latin classes.

=== Gymnasium ===
The JRAHS Gymnasium began construction in late 2016 and opened in 2017. It is the furthest block from Barrengarry House with the exception of the F Block. The Gymnasium currently plays hosts to a majority of Physical Education classes, and can be altered to play volleyball, netball, basketball or futsal. During exam periods, the facility can be converted into an additional exam hall to supplement the J.C. Hoskin Auditorium.

== Controversies ==
=== Racism, Racial Exclusion and Threats ===
In November 2024, the Sydney Morning Herald reported on internal community tensions raised during a P&C meeting by principal at the time Rachel Powell. Powell stated during the meeting that students within James Ruse were found to have been engaging in racism towards peers of South Asian descent, referring to them as "slaves" and utilising the "N-word", with such rhetoric "increasing" over time. Only one incident of racial language was formally recorded by the school. It was further reported that some parents were refusing to allow their children to socialise with students of different racial backgrounds outside of school hours. Additional issues raised included parental exclusion within the school, with some parents alleged to have been from the "Chinese community" using "social media groups [...] in a different language to the one [some parents] understand", and alleged threats of physical violence towards some parents resulting in hesitancy to volunteer. Emails were sent encouraging the use of English in school communications. The overt use of racism was heavily condemned by Powell, who called it "absolutely intolerable". Powell chose not to go into detail surrounding the racism allegations as "The Sydney Morning Herald and The Daily Telegraph would have a field day if they found out about anything negative" and that they "would love to report on that".

In 2022, James Ruse was one of the several schools in which students were investigated for links to an online private Discord chat room run by senior-school students at Knox Grammar School. Accounts linked to students by their student emails were used to send "racist, anti-Semitic and homophobic videos, messages and rantings on violent misogyny".

=== Private Coaching and Tutoring ===
In February 2024, in coordination with the NSW Education Department, the school initiated measures to serve cease and desist letters to tutoring centres accused of using school resources, assessment tasks, and trial exams without permission for commercial gain, confirmed in an email sent to 500 school principals. It is alleged that these coaching centres replaced the school's logo with their own watermark in some instances. It was reported that students coached by these centres, at Ruse and systemically across top-performing schools in NSW, tutor after graduation and pass on these resources. Former principal Powell requested that other principals provide evidence if they have any. Additionally, education advocates raised concerns regarding the extent of assistance provided by tutors in coaching centres in assessments and exams.

== Notable alumni ==
=== Business, science, and public service ===
- Scott Farquhar – co-CEO of Australian software company Atlassian
- Andrew Leigh – economist and Member of the House of Representatives
- Cleo Loi – astrophysicist, mapped atmospheric plasma tubes aligning with Earth's magnetic field
- Elizabeth New – chemist and associate professor at University of Sydney, recipient of RSC Dalton Young Researchers Award
- David Shoebridge – former barrister and member of the New South Wales Legislative Council, member of the Australian Senate, and current leader of the Australian Greens.
- Dhananjayan (Danny) Sriskandarajah – Rhodes Scholar, Director General of the Royal Commonwealth Society, CEO of CIVICUS: World Alliance for Citizen Participation
- Mark Taylor – former police officer and prosecutor and State Member for the Electoral district of Winston Hills
- Justin Wolfers – professor of economics and public policy at the University of Michigan
- Peter Barrett – Australian entrepreneur
- Eddie Woo – mathematics teacher known for Wootube, online mathematics lessons
- John Ho – chairman of Bellamy’s Organic, board member of Vocus Group, founder and chief industrialist investor of Janchor Partners
- Timothy Schmidt – physical chemist, Head of the School of Chemistry at University of New South Wales and Fellow of the Australian Academy of Science.

=== Entertainment and the arts ===
- Aravind Adiga – journalist, author, and 2008 Man Booker Prize winner
- Joh Bailey – celebrity hairdresser
- Kate Fagan – (1985–1990) folk singer and poet
- David Fung – international concert pianist, laureate of the Queen Elisabeth Competition and the 12th Arthur Rubinstein International Piano Masters Competition, Tel Aviv (2008), and winner of the 2002 ABC Symphony Australia Young Performer of the Year Award.
- Antony Green – ABC election analyst and commentator
- Jason Davis (Jabba) – radio and television presenter, actor
- Maha Koraiem – co-founder of swiish.com and co-author of Super Green Smoothies
- Magdalena Roze – television weather presenter and meteorologist
- Katrina Warren – television veterinarian

=== Military ===
- RADM Trevor Jones AO, CSC, RAN – Deputy Chief of Navy and former chief of staff of Headquarters Australian Forces in Middle East
- MAJGEN Mark Kelly AO, DSC – Repatriation Commissioner and former commander of Australian Forces in Middle East

=== Sports ===
- Ron Jackson – swimmer, Gold Medal Winner 1650 yard freestyle Commonwealth Games, Kingston, Jamaica, 1966 (while still at school)
- Natalie Bates – cyclist, 2006 Commonwealth Games gold medalist
- Andrew Leeds – footballer, former member of the Australian National Rugby Union team
- Greg Mail – cricketer, former opening batsman for the New South Wales Blues

=== Religious ===
- Greg Anderson – Anglican Bishop of the Northern Territory since 2014.l
- Chris Edwards – Anglican Bishop of North Sydney since 2014
- Gary Koo – Anglican Bishop of the Western Region since 2019
- Stuart McMillan – president of the Uniting Church in Australia, 2015–2018
- Steve Chong – founder of RICE Movement, since 2001

== See also ==
- List of government schools in New South Wales
- List of selective high schools in New South Wales
- Hurlstone Agricultural High School
