= Meganne Christian =

Anglo-Italian materials scientist

Meganne Christian FRAeS
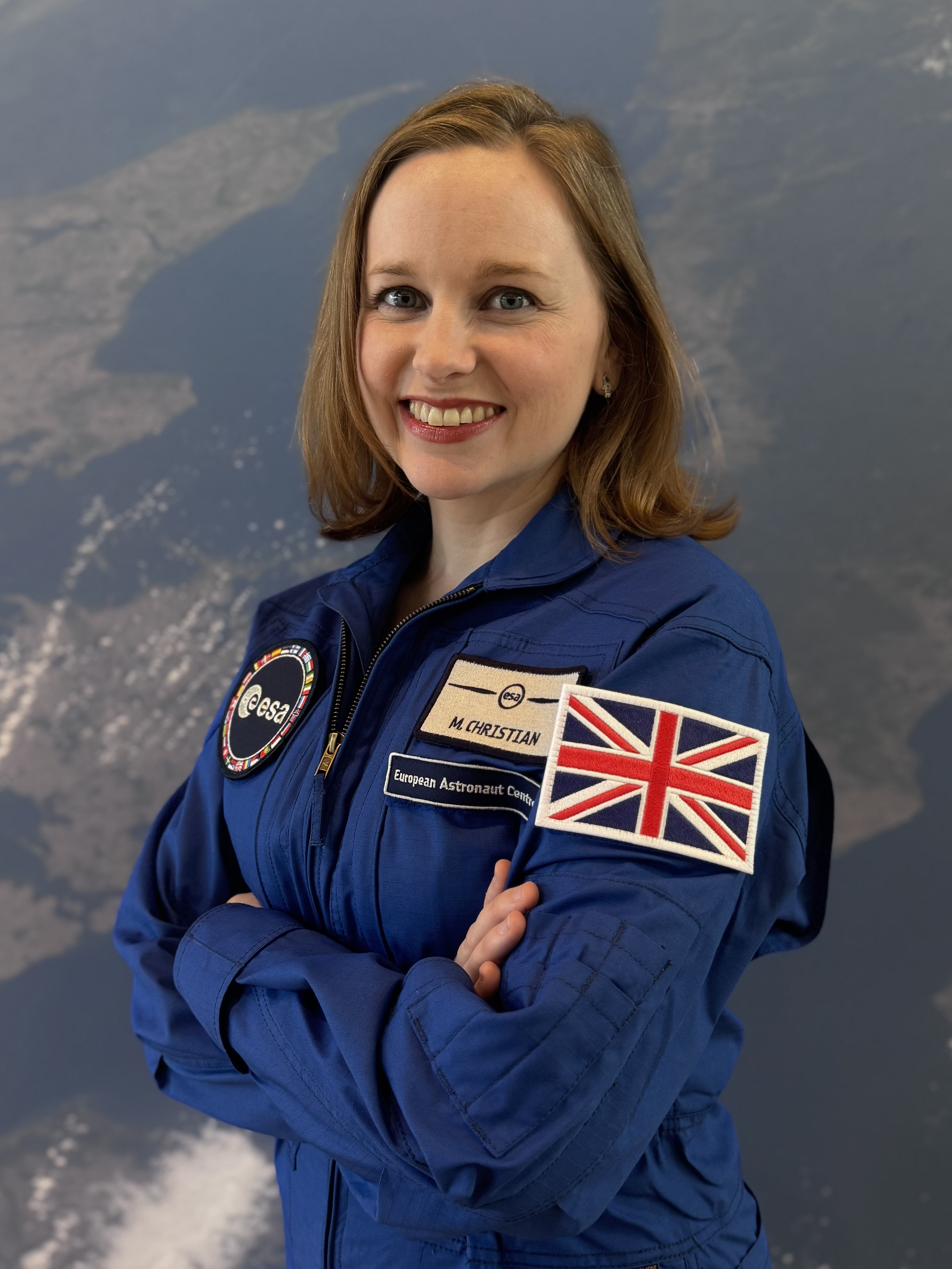
- Christian at European Astronaut Centre, 2025
- Born: December 1987; Pembury
- Education: University of New South Wales, The Illawarra Grammar School
- Occupations: Researcher; astronaut
- Employers: Materials Energy Research Laboratory in Nanoscale (2009–2013); European Space Agency (2022–); National Antarctic Research Program (2018–2021); National Research Council (2014–2023); UK Space Agency (2023–)
- Awards: Fellow of the Royal Aeronautical Society (2024–)
- Scientific career
- Fields: Graphene, hydrogen storage, atmospheric physics, nanomaterials, Antarctic, space exploration
- Workplaces: National Research Council (2014–2023); Materials Energy Research Laboratory in Nanoscale (2009–2013); National Antarctic Research Program (2018–2021); European Space Agency (2022–); UK Space Agency (2023–)
- Thesis: Core-shell borohydrides for reversible hydrogen storage
- Space career

ESA astronaut
- Selection: 2022 ESA Group

Meganne Louise Christian (born 1987) FRAeS is a member of the 2022 European Space Agency Astronaut Group, and Reserve Astronaut and Exploration Commercialisation Lead at the UK Space Agency.

She was previously a materials scientist at the National Research Council (CNR) in Bologna, Italy, and atmospheric physicist at Concordia Station in Antarctica.

== Research ==
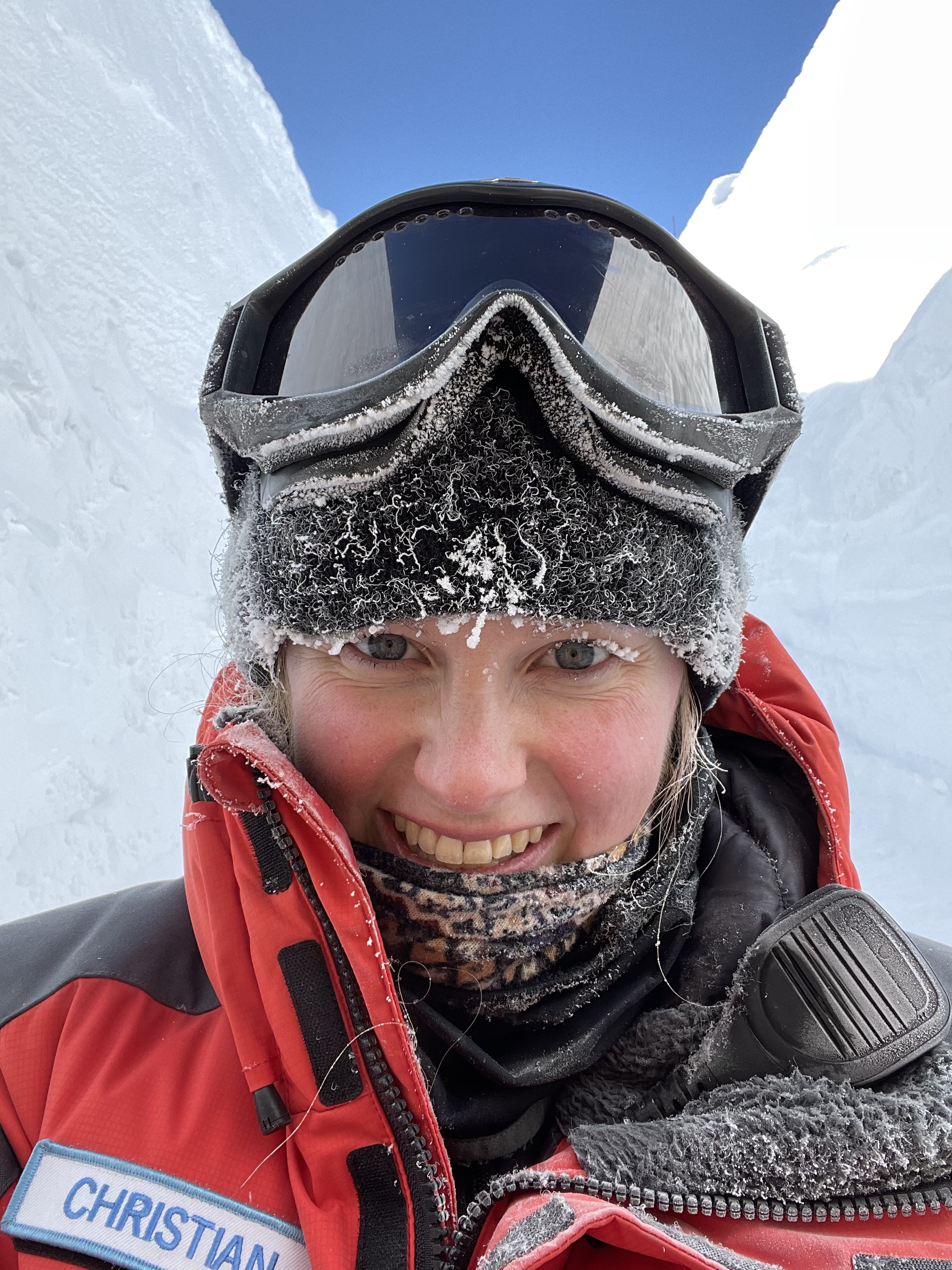
Christian in the snow, at Concordia Station, Antarctica

At the Italian National Research Agency (CNR) in Bologna, she worked on the production and microscopical characterisation of graphene-based nanocomposites, in particular 3D graphene structures such as graphene foams, as part of the EU's Graphene Flagship. This included zero-gravity research in 2018, studying the application of loop heat pipes for the heat management of satellites. She held the role of atmospheric physicist and meteorologist at the Franco-Italian Antarctic research base at Concordia Station during the 2019 "DC15" Winter-over campaign and the 2020–21 Summer season.

== Biography ==
Born in Kent, England to New Zealand parents, at five she moved with her family to Wollongong, Australia. She attended The Illawarra Grammar School and was part of the school's 2002 international championship team of Future Problem Solving Program International. Studying at the University of New South Wales, in 2009 Christian received a Bachelor of Engineering and the university medal in industrial chemistry. Continuing at UNSW, she received the 2011 Heinz Harant award and her doctorate in 2014 for research into hydrogen storage with borohydrides, after which she moved in Bologna and worked at the Institute of Microelectronics and Microsystems (IMM) at the National Research Council of Italy. The ambassador of Australia to Italy featured Christian as part of International Day of Women and Girls in Science 2021. In June 2023, she was appointed Reserve Astronaut and Exploration Commercialisation Lead at the UK Space Agency. In 2023, she received the Australia Day award "Wollongong to the world" from the city. In March 2024, she was elected as a Fellow of the Royal Aeronautical Society.

She holds four citizenships, British and New Zealand by birth; Australian and Italian by naturalisation. She was married on Australia Day 2014 at St James' Church, Sydney to Liam Wyatt. She received Italian citizenship in 2022.

A barbershop singer, Christian has twice won the Sweet Adelines International competition's "harmony classic" division – in 2017 and 2023 with Canberra-based choir Brindabella chorus. She holds a blackbelt in Hapkido. Other hobbies include via ferrata, knitting, sewing and whitewater rafting. In 2026 she was selected as a fellow for the Karman Project.
