= Bishop of the Western Region =

Bishop of (the) West(ern) (Region) may refer to:

- Bishop of the Western Region, an assistant bishop in the Anglican Diocese of Sydney
- Bishop of the Western Region, an assistant bishop in the Anglican Diocese of Brisbane
- Bishop of the Western Region, an assistant bishop in the Anglican Diocese of Melbourne
