= Diocese of the Southern Cross =

Anglican diocese in Australia

- Classification: Anglican
- Polity: Episcopal
- Bishop: Glenn Davies
- Associations: GAFCON
- Region: Australia
- Origin: 2022
- Separated from: Anglican Church of Australia
- Churches: 7
- Official website: scd.org.au

The Diocese of the Southern Cross is an Anglican diocese in Australia unaffiliated with the Anglican Church of Australia or the Anglican Communion. It is led by a former Archbishop of Sydney, Glenn Davies.

== History ==
The diocese was formed by GAFCON Australia in August 2022, following a split from the Anglican Church of Australia over same-sex marriage among other issues.

The diocese is backed by the Archbishop of Sydney, Kanishka Raffel, and the Bishop of Tasmania, Richard Condie.

Initially, the diocese had three congregations. The first congregation was in Beenleigh, Queensland, while a second in Brisbane joined in September 2022. A third congregation joined the diocese in January 2023. Its fourth congregation joined on 30 January 2023. The diocese also welcomed its first female minister.

A former Uniting Church in Australia congregation, Faith Church in Mooloolaba, led by the Rev. Hedley Fihaki (former head of the Assembly of Confessing Congregations) has joined the Diocese of the Southern Cross.
