= T Keller =

T Keller may refer to:

- Thomas Keller (born 1955), American chef
- Timothy J. Keller (born 1950), pastor of Redeemer Presbyterian Church in New York City
