= Gary Koo =

Australian Anglican bishop (born 1968)

The Right Reverend Gary Koo
- Bishop of the Western Region
- Church: Anglican Church of Australia
- Province: Province of New South Wales
- Diocese: Diocese of Sydney
- Installed: 20 December 2019
- Predecessor: Ivan Lee

Orders
- Ordination: 2006 (as deacon); 2013 (as presbyter)
- Consecration: 20 December 2019 by Glenn Davies

Personal details
- Born: Gary Siew Leong Koo; 1968 (age 57–58)
- Denomination: Anglicanism
- Spouse: Pearl
- Children: 2
- Education: University of Sydney (medicine); Moore Theological College (theology)

Gary Siew Leong Koo (born 1968) is an Australian Anglican bishop who, since 20 December 2019, has served as an assistant bishop in the Anglican Diocese of Sydney, becoming the third Bishop of the Western Region.

== Early life, education and parish ministry ==
Koo was born in 1968 in Sydney, as the son of two Malaysian migrants. He was educated at James Ruse Agricultural High School and then studied medicine at the University of Sydney. Koo was brought up as an atheist, but the death of his mother while he was training as a doctor at University caused him to reassess his views and he converted to Christianity.

After graduating from university, Koo worked as a doctor for a time. He then decided to study theology at Moore Theological College. and was ordained deacon in 2006 and priest (presbyter) in 2013.

Koo served as a pastor and church planter for the Chinese Christian Church Sydney. He later was appointed as a minister within the Anglican Diocese of Sydney at St Paul's Carlingford and North Rocks, where he was eventually made rector, a position which he held for seven years prior to his appointment to the episcopate. He served as acting rector at Berala from 2013 to 2015.

== Episcopal ministry ==
In November 2019, Koo was appointed as Bishop of the Western Region in the Sydney Diocese, a role which involves overseeing congregations in the Blue Mountains, Hills District, Hawkesbury, and Parramatta areas. He replaced Bishop Ivan Lee, who was the first Anglican bishop in Australia to have a Chinese ethnic background and who moved at that time into a new episcopal role strengthening church growth. Koo was consecrated bishop in St John's Cathedral, Parramatta by Archbishop Glenn Davies on 20 December 2019.

As assistant bishop, Koo has chaired the Diocese's COVID-19 taskforce throughout 2020.

== Personal life ==
Koo is married to Pearl and has two children.
