= Kathy Keller =

American theologian (born 1950)

Kathy Louise Keller (born 1950) is an American author, lecturer, and Christian theologian from New York City who has appeared on the New York Times Best Seller list. She was the wife of pastor Tim Keller (1950–2023), founder of New York's Redeemer Presbyterian Church.

== Early life and education ==
Kathy Keller (Kristy) was born in Pittsburgh, Pennsylvania, to Mary Louise Stephens and Henry R. Kristy (Kristolich), a Westinghouse Electric Company executive and World War II pilot of Croatian descent. Keller grew up in Monroeville, Pennsylvania with her four siblings. When she was twelve years old, she corresponded with Oxford University scholar and popular theologian C. S. Lewis and their correspondence was later published. She graduated from Gateway High School and Community College of Allegheny County. She then received a B.A. in English from Allegheny College in 1972 where she was active in campus ministry.

== Marriage to Tim Keller, career, and founding Redeemer ==
In 1975 she received a Master of Theological Studies (M.T.S.) summa cum laude from Gordon Conwell Theological Seminary in Massachusetts which she attended with her future husband, Tim Keller. They were first introduced through Kathy's sister, Susan, who was a Bucknell classmate of Tim, and they married shortly before graduation in January 1975 at Crossroads Presbyterian Church in Monroeville. The Kellers helped lead a Presbyterian church in Hopewell, Virginia before moving to Philadelphia where Kathy Keller served as an editor at Great Commission Publications, and her husband taught at Westminster Theological Seminary. In 1989 Tim Keller founded Redeemer Presbyterian Church in New York City, a Presbyterian Church in America (PCA) congregation, which became one of the most influential churches in America. Kathy served in various roles at Redeemer including on the Communication Committee and assistant director of Communication and Media and the editor at Redeemer. She has three adult sons.

== Writings ==
Kathy Keller has authored numerous theological books, most importantly "Jesus, Justice and Gender Roles" and, with her husband, The Meaning of Marriage (2013), (a New York Times best seller). She also co-authored with her husband God's Wisdom for Navigating Life; and The Songs of Jesus and The Meaning of Marriage Devotional. Keller has also published many articles, including pieces in the New York Times and has been featured in various media sources including Christianity Today and ABC News Nightline.
