= The Reason for God =

2008 book by Tim Keller

The Reason for God: Belief in an Age of Skepticism
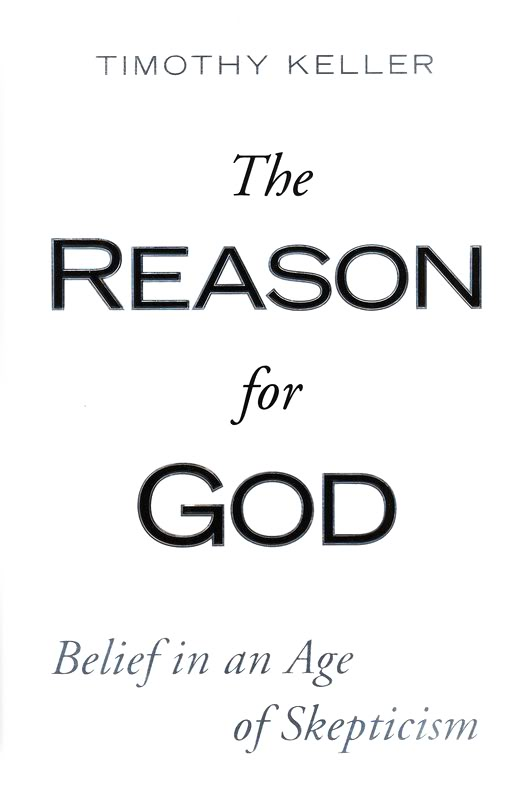
- Cover to the Riverhead Trade edition
- Author: Timothy J. Keller
- Language: English
- Genre: Christian apologetics
- Publisher: Dutton
- Publication date: 2008
- Publication place: United States
- Media type: Print (Hardback)
- Pages: 293 (first edition)
- ISBN: 978-1-101-21765-8

The Reason for God: Belief in an Age of Skepticism, published in 2008, is a book and DVD on Christian apologetics by Timothy J. Keller, a scholar and founding pastor of Redeemer Presbyterian Church in New York City.

== Book ==
The Reason for God: Belief in an Age of Skepticism deals with objections to Christian belief in Part 1, "The Leap of Doubt". Skeptical authors cited include J. L. Mackie, Richard Dawkins, Daniel Dennett, Sam Harris, and Christopher Hitchens. It invokes critical rationality or critical rationalism at "Intermission" as a method of stating arguments for God and belief in Part 2, "The Reasons for Faith".

In the book, Keller draws from diverse sources, including the Bible, C. S. Lewis, Francis Collins, Alvin Plantinga, Stephen Jay Gould, Rodney Stark, Anne Rice, Annie Dillard, Flannery O'Connor, Jonathan Edwards, Søren Kierkegaard, and N. T. Wright.

The book received awards from World magazine and Christianity Today and was #7 on The New York Times Best Seller list for non-fiction in March 2008.

== Prequel ==
A book by Keller after The Reason for God, described by him as a prequel to it, is Making Sense of God: An Invitation to the Skeptical (2016).

== DVD ==
The Reasons for God: Conversations on Faith and Life is a recording of Timothy Keller meeting with a group of people over six sessions to address their doubts and objections to Christianity.
