= Donald Cameron (bishop) =

Anglican bishop

The Right Reverend Donald Cameron
- Bishop of North Sydney
- Church: Anglican Church of Australia
- Province: Province of New South Wales
- Diocese: Diocese of Sydney
- In office: 1983–1990
- Predecessor: Position created
- Successor: Paul Barnett
- Other posts: Assistant bishop and Diocesan Registrar, 1990–1993

Orders
- Ordination: 1959
- Consecration: 24 June 1975 by Marcus Loane

Personal details
- Born: Ewen Donald Cameron; 7 November 1926 (age 99)
- Denomination: Anglicanism
- Spouse: Rosemary (1952–2015)
- Children: 3

Ewen Donald Cameron (born 7 November 1926) is an Australian retired Anglican bishop who served as an assistant bishop in the Anglican Diocese of Sydney. He was the Bishop of North Sydney from 1983 to 1990, and the Diocesan Registrar from 1990 to 1993.

Cameron was born in Leura to Ewen and Dulcie Cameron (née Parsons). He was educated at Sydney Church of England Grammar School. After an earlier career in accountancy he was ordained in 1959. He was a curate at Chatswood, New South Wales and then a lecturer at Moore Theological College until 1963. He was rector of Bellevue Hill, New South Wales and then Federal Secretary of CMS Australia until 1972. He was Archdeacon of Cumberland until his ordination to the episcopate on 24 June 1975 at St Andrew's Cathedral, Sydney. He served as an assistant bishop of the Diocese of Sydney from that day until his retirement in 1993, during which time he was also area bishop for North Sydney (1983–1990) and Diocesan Registrar (1990–1993).

He married his wife, Rosemary, in 1952, and the couple had three children. Donald and Rosemary remained married up through her death in 2015.
