= Robert Forsyth (bishop) =

The Right Reverend Robert Forsyth
- Bishop of South Sydney
- Church: Anglican Church of Australia
- Province: New South Wales
- Diocese: Sydney
- In office: June 13, 2000 – December 31, 2015
- Predecessor: Peter Watson
- Successor: Michael Stead
- Previous post: Rector of St Barnabas Anglican Church, Broadway (1983–2000)

Orders
- Ordination: 1976 (as deacon and as priest) by Marcus Loane (as deacon); Donald Robinson (as priest)
- Consecration: 11 June 2000 by Harry Goodhew

Personal details
- Born: Robert Charles Forsyth; 8 June 1949 (age 77)
- Spouse: Margie
- Children: 4
- Education: University of Sydney (BA, MTh); Moore Theological College (ThL, BD, Dip A)

Robert Charles Forsyth (born 8 June 1949) is an Australian Anglican bishop who served as the Anglican Bishop of South Sydney, a region of the Anglican Diocese of Sydney, from 2000 to 2015. Before this he was the rector of St. Barnabas, Broadway.

Forsyth is married to Margie and has four children and ten grandchildren. He attended Meadowbank Boys High School and was a candidate for the Methodist ministry for a number of years but changed to Anglican candidature in 1972.

On 19 January 2008, Forsyth condemned Corpus Christi, a play depicting Judas seducing Jesus: "It is deliberately, not innocently, offensive and they're obviously having a laugh about it." The play also showed Jesus administrating a marriage between two of his male apostles.
