= John Reid (bishop) =

Anglican bishop (1928–2016)

John Robert Reid (15 July 1928 – 2 January 2016) was an Australian Anglican bishop who served as an assistant bishop in the Anglican Diocese of Sydney: he was the Bishop of South Sydney (the Southern Region) from 1972 to 1993.

Reid was educated at the University of Melbourne and Moore Theological College. He was ordained in 1955 by Howard Mowll, Archbishop of Sydney. After a curacy in Manly he was Rector at Gladesville from 1956 to 1969, when he became Archdeacon of Cumberland, his last position before being ordained to the episcopate. He was consecrated bishop on 25 July 1972 at St Andrew's Cathedral, Sydney.

He died in January 2016 several weeks after consecration of new Bishop of South Sydney. He was chairman of Lausanne Movement and was involved in missionary organisation Interserve.

== Books ==
- Reid, John (2004). Marcus L. Loane: a biography. Brunswick East, Victoria, Australia: Acorn Press Ltd. ISBN 0-908284-47-0.
