= Redeemer City to City =

Church planting organization

Redeemer City to City is a church planting organization co-founded by Tim Keller in 2001. After transitioning from his leadership position at Redeemer Presbyterian Church in 2017, Tim Keller moved to reach cities such as Johannesburg, Mumbai, London, São Paulo and New York City. Redeemer City to City's mission is to train and equip a new generation of leaders around the globe. CTC has established churches throughout 75 global cities in Africa, Asia, Australia, North America, Latin America, the Middle East and Europe. CTC's goal is to establish a network of small churches in cities.

The organization has planted 838 churches overall, with 90 new churches in 2020.

Redeemer CTC NYC has helped plant 50 churches, train over 200 pastors in the CTC Church Planting Program and is involved with over 20 denominations.

Redeemer CTC has published a podcast named How to Reach the West Again.

Redeemer City to City worked to assist Japanese communities after the 2011 earthquake with World Vision.
