= Jack Dain =

British-Australian Anglican bishop

The Right Reverend Jack Dain OBE
- Born: Arthur John Dain; 13 October 1912; Wolverhampton, England
- Died: 3 March 2003 (aged 90)
- Occupation: Anglican bishop
- Known for: assistant bishop in the Anglican Diocese of Sydney
- Notable work: Evangelism movement: Mission Fields To-day, Missionary Candidates
- Spouses: Edith Jane Stewart (m. 1938; died 1985) Hester Quirk (m. 1986)
- Children: 4 daughters
- Parents: Herbert John Dain (father); Elizabeth Dain (mother)

Arthur John Dain OBE (called Jack; 13 October 1912 – 3 March 2003) was a prominent British-Australian Evangelical Anglican bishop who served as an assistant bishop in the Anglican Diocese of Sydney.

== Early life and education ==
Dain was born in Wolverhampton, son of Herbert John and Elizabeth, and educated at Wolverhampton Grammar School, after which he was in the British Merchant Navy.

== Missionary and military ==
He trained at the Missionary Training College, London and became a missionary in Bihar Province, India (1935–1940) until World War II. During the war, he was a Gurkha until he was seconded to the Royal Indian Navy (1941–1947). He was the General Secretary of the Bible and Medical Missionary Fellowship until 1959, when he was ordained after studies at Ridley Hall, Cambridge.

== Ordained ministry ==
Dain was made a deacon at Michaelmas 20 September 1959, by Falkner Allison, Bishop of Chelmsford, at Chelmsford Cathedral "for the colonies" (i.e. not intended to serve a usual curacy/title in Essex), and ordained priest the same year. Shortly after ordination, he emigrated to Australia to serve as federal secretary of the Church Mission Society there; he was also made an honorary canon of St Andrew's Cathedral, Sydney in 1963. He was consecrated a bishop on 20 April 1965, and served as Bishop-Coadjutor of Sydney (or an assistant bishop). From 1980 until his retirement in 1982, he was senior assistant bishop and chief executive officer of the Diocese of Sydney.

== Evangelism movement ==
Dain was a prominent leader of the Evangelism movement, and closely associated with Billy Graham throughout his ministry. For instance, he served as Overseas Secretary of the British Evangelical Alliance (1950–1959) and chaired several international Evangelism conferences. He was chair of the Billy Graham Evangelistic Association of Australia.

== Personal life and retirement ==
Dain married twice: in 1938 to Edith Jane Stewart (who died 1985), with whom he had four daughters; and in 1986 to Hester Quirk. He was a published author – of Mission Fields To-day in 1956 and of Missionary Candidates in 1959 – and he was made an Officer of the Order of the British Empire (OBE) in 1979. He retired to Lindfield, West Sussex (United Kingdom) and served the Diocese of Chichester as an honorary assistant bishop from 1987 until his death.
