= Steve Chong =

Australian evangelist (born 1978)

- Born: November 30, 1978 (age 46); Sydney, Australia
- Education: The University of Sydney (Bachelor of Commerce)
- Occupations: Pastor; Evangelist
- Spouse: Naomi Chong
- Children: 4
- Website: ricemovement.org

Steve Chong (born November 30, 1978) is the founder and director of the RICE (Renewal and Inter-Church Evangelism) Movement, originating from Sydney, Australia. He rose to national prominence after appearing on the SBS reality TV series "Christians Like Us." ABC characterised him as a Christian leader who "sees an Asian future for the church Down Under." As well as leading the RICE Movement, he is an itinerant evangelist, having preached in multiple cities such as Christchurch, Vancouver, San Francisco, Perth, as well as home town of Sydney. He has been trained and mentored by American ministers Mark Driscoll and Tim Keller.

== Early life and education ==
Chong was born on November 30, 1978, in Sydney, Australia to Chinese-Malaysian parents. They converted from Buddhism to the Christianity at the 1979 Billy Graham Crusade.

He attended James Ruse Agricultural High School and obtained a Bachelor of Commerce from The University of Sydney. With the plan of becoming an Anglican minister, he studied for a Bachelor of Theology at Moore Theological College.

== Ministry career ==
Chong studied at bible college where he was trained in the Anglican Diocese of Sydney by renowned evangelist John Chapman. He then spent 7 years as a young minister at Kirkplace Presbyterian Church, Kogarah in Sydney's inner south, throughout which, he founded the RICE Movement. He was further trained and mentored by American ministers Mark Driscoll and Tim Keller (pastor).

=== RICE Movement ===
Founded in 2002 in Sydney, Australia, Chong formed the RICE Movement with the aim of sharing the gospel of Jesus. Initially starting out with only 6 youth groups and around 120 people, RICE grew to involve thousands of young people in what was known as Australia's largest Asian youth movement, with annual rallies (RICE Rally) held each year in August. Numbers for the rallies appeared to peak in 2008 with an audience of 3,800, tapering to 2,000 people by 2015. As a stated nondenominational movement, RICE Rally has attracted thousands of youth, particularly from the Asian Australian demographic, though Chong says that he never set out to start an Asian-focused ministry. While he says many Asian young people suppress creativity and passion, "We love unlocking that."

RICE Movement's reach expanded from Sydney, to Melbourne, Auckland, Perth, and Sao Paulo. In addition to the annual 'RICE Rally', RICE Movement also ran school focused ministries in the form of RICE Catalyst, RICE Twelve as well as a Grad Program.

In December 2022, it was announced that RICE’s new vision statement was a “catalytic movement that mobilises the next generation for kingdom mission.” The emphasis is on finding and empowering young people for evangelism, with the belief that the next generation of the church needs to be catalysed to share their faith and the conviction that some of the best evangelists are younger than we may think. It was also announced that Naomi Chong (Steve's wife) was appointed as Global Director. There is also focus on establishing the movement in Malaysia as the base for reaching Southeast Asia.

David Wraight, former International President of Youth for Christ (YFC) has been mentoring Steve and Naomi Chong through the changes to RICE.

==== RICE Catalyst ====
RICE Catalyst was a schools-based ministry that aims to relight the flame of Christian youth by running a conference in addition to the main RICE Rally called Catalyst Conference, which brings youth groups and Christian school groups together in order to 'train, encourage and challenge one another the fundamentals of Christian living.'

The main theme of Rally carries through to the main talk, with additional topical workshops, practicals and Q&A panel.

==== RICE Twelve ====
RICE Twelve was a study camp initiative, specifically for Year 12 students, to help them prepare as well as 'provide a Christ-honouring perspective to their work and priorities.'

==== Grad program ====
RICE Movement's Grad Program was aimed at setting 'young adults up for evangelism and ministry in their local church and beyond.' The program has partnered with Ravi Zacharias ministries for apologetics training as well as other local social justice organisations dependant on the city.

== Views ==
Chong has a high view of the significance of Asian people in Western nations like Australia, not simply because of their influence in the culture, but because they will be part of the future of the global Christian faith:

People are having to realise we’re in the China century. And Australia has such a significant part in that. Everything we do is so pegged to Asia. We’re this unique Western country in Asia. That’s why we’ve got this ability to cross these cultures right now. Whether it’s the boom of the church in Korea, or the underground church in China — the crazy statistics that there are more Christians in China than America — the West hasn’t stopped to engage with this. Has the centre of Christianity moved?

Steve identifies himself with practical charismatic theology and describes his experience in a vodacast with Shawn Bolz:

"I'm 42 years old I've got four kids... I would say 37 of those years for me which is a big chunk of time were really firmly built in reformed conservative Evangelism and a particularly conservative version of that in Australia so i'm talking about like really very much so like kind of get in trouble if you raise your hands kind of zone. In terms of spiritual Gifts I would I was definitely affectively a sensationalist but I was if i was open into it as a possibility it would be you know not in practise that's for sure... I probably didn’t believe they exist. You can you can go so far with your own skills and gifts and sometimes it's quite far 'cause those gift from the Lord like you know like your own strength and work ethic but it's been nothing like when the Holy Spirit turned up and met Naomi and I in power because you see you know I've been coming out of a camp that would be I guess the generally called it will be a word base camp but when the word is spirit collide there is no stronger power or force on earth that happens when that happens... so for me there was like it was like a missing piece"

== Media ==
In 2011, Chong appeared on Sunrise. When asked about what drove his passion to pursue youth ministry he said:

"It's something I'm so passionate about, I feel like, young people particular these days, they're craving relationships, I mean you just see it. They're hunched over on their computers all night on Facebook. Why? Because they're craving relationships."

In 2019, Steve Chong appeared on the SBS (Australian TV channel) show 'Christians Like Us'. The show was billed as “10 Australian Christians with vastly different beliefs live under one roof for a week to confront the controversial topics of their faith. They will grapple with what makes a good Christian, and the role religion plays in modern life.” When later describing the experience Chong said, "“Some of the conversations were really intense. And I think that’s to be expected: some of these issues are so personal for people, and go to the heart of people’s backgrounds and hurts they’ve experienced.”

== Personal life ==
Chong is married to Naomi and together they have four children, two boys (Reuben and Jacob) and two girls (Caitlin and Alyssa).
