= Ray Smith (bishop) =

The Right Reverend Ray Smith
- Bishop of Liverpool
- Church: Anglican Church of Australia
- Province: Province of New South Wales
- Diocese: Diocese of Sydney
- In office: 1 November 1993–31 December 2001
- Successor: Peter Tasker

Orders
- Ordination: 1959 (as priest)
- Consecration: 1 November 1993 by Harry Goodhew

Personal details
- Born: Raymond George Smith; 7 March 1936 (age 90)
- Denomination: Anglicanism
- Spouse: Shirley
- Education: Australian College of Theology

Raymond George Smith (born 7 March 1936) is a retired Australian Anglican bishop. He served as an assistant bishop in the Anglican Diocese of Sydney, as the first Bishop of South Western Sydney (then called the "Bishop of Liverpool") from 1 November 1993 to 31 December 2001.

Smith was educated at the Australian College of Theology and ordained in 1959. He served as priest in the Diocese of Armidale from 1959 to 1986, ministering to the parishes of Barraba, Moree, Ashford and Uralla and during that time was collated as archdeacon within the diocese. He was then the Director of Extension Ministries at Trinity Episcopal School for Ministry in Ambridge, Pennsylvania in the United States until 1990 when he returned to Australia to be the Archdeacon of South Canberra and Rector of Wanniassa the Diocese of Canberra and Goulburn, his last positions before being ordained to the episcopate.

Following his retirement as an assistant bishop, Smith worked as an assistant minister at St Philip's Church, Sydney until 2019.

Smith is married to Shirley and has three children.

Anglican Communion titles
New creation	Bishop of South Western Sydney (as Bishop of Liverpool); 1993–2001	Succeeded by Peter Tasker
