= Michael Stead =

Australian Anglican bishop

The Right Reverend Michael Stead
- Bishop of South Sydney
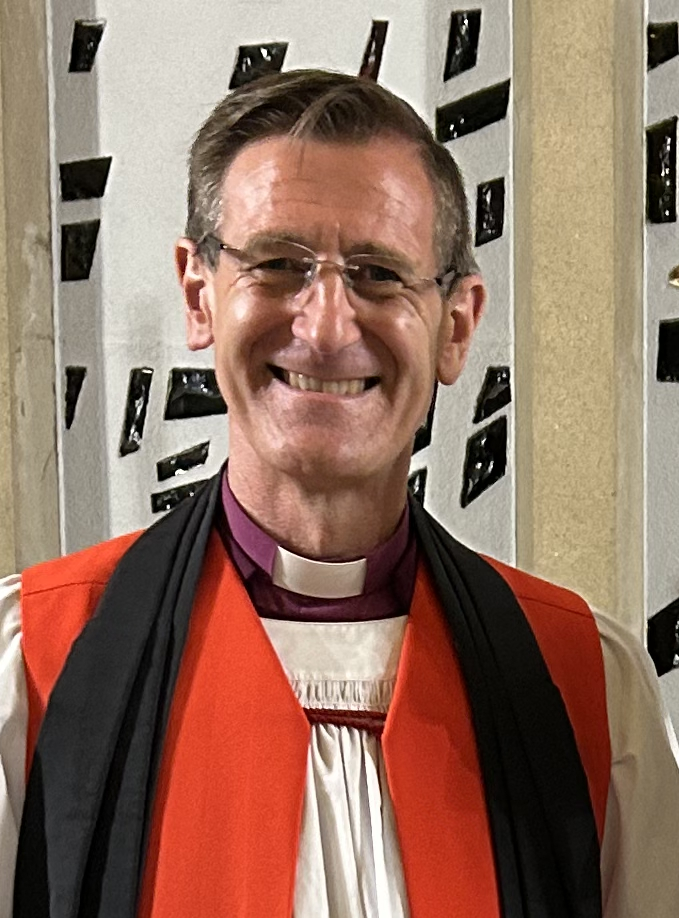
- Church: Anglican Church of Australia
- Province: Province of New South Wales
- Diocese: Diocese of Sydney
- In office: December 2015 to present
- Predecessor: Robert Forsyth

Orders
- Ordination: 2001 (as deacon); 2002 (as priest)
- Consecration: 5 December 2015 by Glenn Davies

Personal details
- Born: Michael Stead; 1969 (age 56–57)
- Denomination: Anglicanism
- Spouse: Felicity
- Children: 3
- Education: University of New South Wales (B. Comm (Acc)); Moore Theological College (BD, Dip. Min); University of Gloucestershire (PhD)

Michael Rennie Stead (born 1969) is an Australian Anglican bishop. Since December 2015, he has been Bishop of South Sydney (Bishop of the Southern Region), an assistant bishop in the Diocese of Sydney.

== Early life and ministry ==
Stead was brought to Sunday school at a Gospel Chapel in Brookvale, New South Wales by his grandmother, where he became a Christian. He graduated from the University of New South Wales in Commerce (Accounting) in 1990, before later studying theology at Moore Theological College.

Stead was ordained deacon in 2001 and priest in 2002. From 2001 to 2006, he served as an assistant minister at Turramurra, where he subsequently became Senior Assistant Minister in 2007 then Rector from 2008 to 2016. He also served as a visiting lecturer at Moore College, teaching in the Old Testament department and publishing a number of books (particularly on Zechariah). Stead completed a PhD at the University of Gloucester in 2007.

== Episcopal ministry ==
On 24 August 2015, Archbishop Glenn Davies announced that he had chosen Stead as the next Bishop of South Sydney (Bishop of the Southern Region). Stead was to succeed Bishop Robert Forsyth who retired in December 2015.

Stead was consecrated a bishop on 5 December 2015 by Glenn Davies, the Archbishop of Sydney. As bishop he has worked with GAFCON, helping organise the 2013 and 2018 conferences, and was a member of the writing groups that produced the communiques for each of the GAFCON conferences.

Stead was one of four nominees to replace Glenn Davies as Anglican Archbishop of Sydney, to be decided at a special election Synod in May 2021. In 2019, the Sydney Morning Herald had described Stead as one of the "leading contenders" for the position. Stead's name did not proceed to the final election list.

== Personal life ==
Stead is married to Felicity and has 3 children.
