= Malcolm Richards =

Australian bishop (born 1959/60)

The Right Reverend Malcolm Richards
- Assistant bishop for International Relations, Anglican Diocese of Sydney
- Church: Anglican Church of Australia
- Diocese: Sydney
- Installed: 6 July 2019

Orders
- Consecration: 6 July 2019 by Glenn Davies

Personal details
- Born: 1959 or 1960 (age 66–67)
- Denomination: Anglican
- Spouse: Elizabeth
- Children: 3
- Education: Moore Theological College

Malcolm George Richards (born 1959/1960) is an Australian bishop in the Anglican Church of Australia. He has served as an assistant bishop in the Anglican Diocese of Sydney, as the Bishop for International Relations, since July 2019.

Richards grew up in Canberra, and originally trained and worked as an optometrist. He and his wife pledged to become missionaries, and from 1988 to 1994 they moved to what was then Zaire with their children to carry out youth work. He lived in Goma on the Rwandan border during the Rwandan genocide.

On returning to Australia, Richards trained at Moore Theological College, then worked in parish ministry in the Anglican Diocese of Canberra and Goulburn, where he planted a church. He then returned to the now-Democratic Republic of Congo in 2005 where he worked for a further five years for the Anglian Diocese of Kindu.

In October 2010, Richards was appointed as General Secretary of the Church Missionary Society, New South Wales and Australian Capital Territory branch, a position he remained in for eight years until he became bishop. He was a canon of St Andrew's Cathedral, Sydney between 2012 and his consecration as bishop in 2019.

In April 2019, Richards was named by Anglican Archbishop of Sydney Glenn Davies as Bishop for International Relations, replacing Peter Tasker who had held the role since 2009. He was consecrated bishop on 6 July 2019. Richards was the first person to hold the role without a concurrent diocesan bishop responsibility. Instead, Richards took up a position as Director of the Centre for Global Mission at Moore Theological College.

Richards is married to Elizabeth and has three children. He is fluent in Swahili and French.
