= Peter Hayward =

Australian Anglican bishop (born 1959)

The Right Reverend Peter Hayward
- Bishop of Wollongong
- Church: Anglican Church of Australia
- Province: Province of New South Wales
- Diocese: Diocese of Sydney
- In office: December 2015 to present
- Predecessor: Al Stewart

Orders
- Ordination: 1992
- Consecration: 13 April 2010 by Peter Jensen

Personal details
- Born: Peter Lindsay Hayward; 1959 (age 66–67) Sydney, Australia
- Denomination: Anglicanism
- Spouse: Julie
- Children: 3
- Education: University of New South Wales (civil engineering); Moore Theological College (theology)

Peter Lindsay Hayward (born 1959) is an Australian Anglican bishop who has served as an assistant bishop in the Anglican Diocese of Sydney since 13 April 2010, in the role of Bishop of Wollongong.

Hayward was born in Sydney, but his family moved to Nowra when he was 9 years old, and he lived there for the next 20 years of his life. He studied civil engineering at the University of New South Wales, worked as a civil engineer for Shoalhaven City Council for 5 years and then trained for the Anglican ministry at Moore Theological College. He was ordained in 1992 and was a curate at Glenmore Park. He then ministered at Christ the Redeemer Church in Spokane, Washington and Beverly Hills, New South Wales before being ordained to the episcopate in April 2010.

Following the retirement of Glenn Davies as Anglican Archbishop of Sydney on 26 March 2021, Hayward was the administrator of the diocese. Hayward was one of four nominees to replace Glenn Davies as Anglican Archbishop of Sydney, to be decided at a special election Synod in May 2021. He was eliminated in the first round of voting.
