= Timothy Schmidt =

Australian physical chemist

Timothy Schmidt FAA FRACI FRSN FRSC
- Born: Timothy Schmidt; 1975 (age 50–51); Canberra
- Education: University of Sydney; Cambridge University
- Awards: Coblentz Award, 2010
- Scientific career
- Workplaces: University of Basel; University of Sydney; University of New South Wales
- Thesis: Femtosecond dynamics of molecules in intense laser fields (2002)
- Doctoral advisor: Gareth Roberts
- Website: www.unsw.edu.au/staff/timothy-schmidt

Timothy Schmidt (born 1975) is an Australian physical chemist, Professor, and Head of the School of Chemistry, University of New South Wales.

== Early life and education ==
Schmidt was born in Canberra in 1975. He represented Australia at the International Chemistry Olympiad in 1993, winning a bronze medal, and graduated from James Ruse Agricultural High School. He obtained a BSc (Hons) from University of Sydney, winning the university medal in theoretical chemistry. He studied for his PhD under Gareth Roberts at Churchill College, Cambridge, graduating in 2002.

== Research and career ==
Schmidt undertook postdoctoral studies with John Paul Maier, FRS, at The University of Basel and was appointed as a research scientist at CSIRO in 2003. In 2004 he was appointed as lecturer at The University of Sydney and rose to associate professor before taking up an ARC Future Fellowship at The University of New South Wales in 2014. In 2026 he was elected a Fellow of the Australian Academy of Science

=== Awards ===
- 2026 Fellow of the Australian Academy of Science
- 2022 Liversidge Lecture
- 2015 Broida Prize, International Symposium on Free Radicals
- 2015 Fellow of the Royal Society of New South Wales
- 2012 APA Prize for Young Scientist
- 2010 Coblentz Award
- 2009 Young Tall Poppy Science Award
- 1998 University of Sydney The University Medal
