= Maha Corbett =

Australian cookbook author (born 1978)

Maha Corbett (nee Koraiem)
- Born: March 5, 1978 (age 48); Sydney, NSW, Australia
- Occupations: Co-author of three cookbooks; Co-Founder & Director of SWIISH.com
- Known for: Books - Super Green Smoothies, The Good Life and Simple and Lean

Maha Corbett is an Australian author and web entrepreneur.

Corbett and her sister Sally Obermeder wrote the books Super Green Smoothies, The Good Life and Simple and Lean. She is the co-founder and director of swiish.com.

== Education and early career ==
Corbett attended James Ruse Agricultural High School in Carlingford, New South Wales. She completed a Bachelor of Arts in the Division of Psychology at Macquarie University in 2006. In 2016, Corbett completed studies in health and nutrition through education, gaining accreditation with the International Institute for Complementary Therapists.

From 1999 to September 2010, Corbett worked as the Head of Investment Bank Human Resources. Corbett moved into a role as a Head of human resources at ANZ in 2010, where she was worked until March 2013.

== Career ==
In November 2012, Corbett and Obermeder launched swiish.com. The website focuses on living a stylish and affordable lifestyle. In 2015, swiish.com expanded into an online store.

In September 2014, Corbett and Obermeder released the e-book Super Green Smoothies In April 2015, Allen and Unwin published an extended paperback version of the book. The book is in its 12th reprint and has sold over 130,000 copies. In March 2016, the sisters released their cookbook, The Good Life.

Corbett and Obermeder launched their Super Green Smoothie 30 Day Smoothie Challenge. The challenge requires participants to drink one super green smoothie every day for 30 days, using the recipes provided.

In November 2016, Corbett and Obermeder launched Swish Wellness, an all-natural products brand. In September 2017, they released their third cookbook, Super Green, Simple and Lean.
