= Peter Tasker =

Anglican assistant bishop

Peter Tasker is a former assistant bishop in the Anglican Diocese of Sydney, Bishop of Georges River.

Tasker was educated at Moore Theological College and ordained in 1964. After curacies in Wollongong, Chatswood and Engadine he was Vicar of St George's Penang in Malaya from 1970.

Tasker retired in 2009, but was acting bishop of Georges River from June 2013 to May 2015, when there was neither assistant bishop nor archdeacon, owing to funding problems.

Anglican Communion titles
Preceded by Ray Smith	Bishop of South Western Sydney (as Bishop of Liverpool); 2001–2009	Succeeded by left vacant
New title	Bishop for International Relations (Anglican Diocese of Sydney); 2009–2019	Succeeded by Malcolm Richards
Preceded by left vacant	Bishop of South Western Sydney (as Acting Bishop of Georges River); 2013–2014	Succeeded by Peter Lin
