= Paul Barnett (bishop) =

Australian bishop and scholar of ancient history and theology

The Right Reverend Paul Barnett AM
- Bishop of North Sydney
- Church: Anglican Church of Australia
- Province: Province of New South Wales
- Diocese: Diocese of Sydney
- In office: 1990–2001
- Predecessor: Donald Cameron
- Successor: Glenn Davies

Orders
- Ordination: 1965
- Consecration: 1 May 1990 by Donald Robinson

Personal details
- Born: Paul William Barnett; 23 September 1935 (age 91)
- Denomination: Anglicanism
- Spouse: Anita
- Children: 4

Paul William Barnett AM (born 23 September 1935) is an Australian Anglican bishop, ancient historian and New Testament scholar. He was the Bishop of North Sydney from 1990 to 2001. He is a prominent historical writer on the rise of Christianity and the historical Jesus. He is currently a fellow in ancient history at Macquarie University in Sydney, Australia and a teaching fellow at Regent College, Vancouver, Canada.

== Background ==
Barnett holds a Master of Arts (MA Hons) from the University of Sydney, a Licentiate in Theology (ThL) from the Australian College of Theology, a Bachelor of Divinity (BD Hons) and a Doctor of Philosophy (PhD; London) on the interaction between the New Testament and Jewish history of the first century. His dissertation at the University of London was titled "The Jewish eschatalogical prophets A.D. 40-70 in their theological and political setting". "[He is] now a teaching fellow at Regent College, Vancouver, [and] is a respected classicist and historian."

Barnett was ordained in 1965 and ministered at St Barnabas' Broadway in Sydney and Holy Trinity Church in North Terrace, Adelaide before becoming the master of Robert Menzies College at Macquarie University from 1980. He was later the chairman of the New Documents Illustrating early Christianity project which is now in its 10th volume. The ninth volume was dedicated to Barnett and contains an introduction on his impact on New Testament ancient history by Edwin Judge. He is married to Anita Barnett. He has 4 children and 11 grandchildren.

Barnett was made a Member of the Order of Australia in the 2019 Queen's Birthday Honours.

== Bibliography ==
- Is the New Testament History?. Hodder & Stoughton, 1986. Revised Edition: Aquila, 2004. ISBN 1-876960-82-5
- Bethlehem to Patmos. Hodder & Stoughton, 1989. Revised Edition: Paternoster, 2013. ISBN 978-0-8928-3381-8
- Apocalypse Now and Then: Reading Revelation Today (Reading the Bible Today Commentaries). 1989. Reprinted, Aquila Press, 2001. ISBN 978-1-875861-41-5
- The Servant King: Reading Mark Today. 1991. ISBN 978-1-875861-32-3
- The Truth about Jesus. First Edition 1994. Second Edition: Aquila, 2004. ISBN 1-876960-91-4
- The Second Letter of Paul to the Corinthians NIC. 1997.
- Jesus and the Logic of History. Leicester: IVP (UK). 1997.
- Jesus and the Rise of Early Christianity. IVP Academic, 1999. ISBN 978-0-8308-2699-5
- The Shepherd King: reading John today. Aquila Press, 2005. ISBN 1-920935-76-2
- Living Hope: Reading 1 Peter today. Aquila Press, 2006. ISBN 1-921137-63-0
- The Birth of Christianity. Eerdmans, 2006. ISBN 978-0-8028-2781-4
- Paul, Missionary of Jesus. Eerdmans, 2006. ISBN 978-0-8028-4891-8
- Finding the Historical Christ. Eerdmans, 2009. ISBN 978-0-8028-4890-1
- Messiah. Intervarsity Press, 2009. ISBN 978-1-84474-352-0
- The Corinthian Question. Apollos, 2011. ISBN 978-1-84474-532-6
- 1 Corinthians: Holiness and Hope of a Rescued People (Focus on the Bible). Christian Focus, 2011. ISBN 978-1-84550-721-3

Anglican Communion titles
Preceded by [[]]	Bishop of North Sydney; 1990-2001	Succeeded by [[]]
