= Joh Bailey =

Australian hair stylist (born 1962)

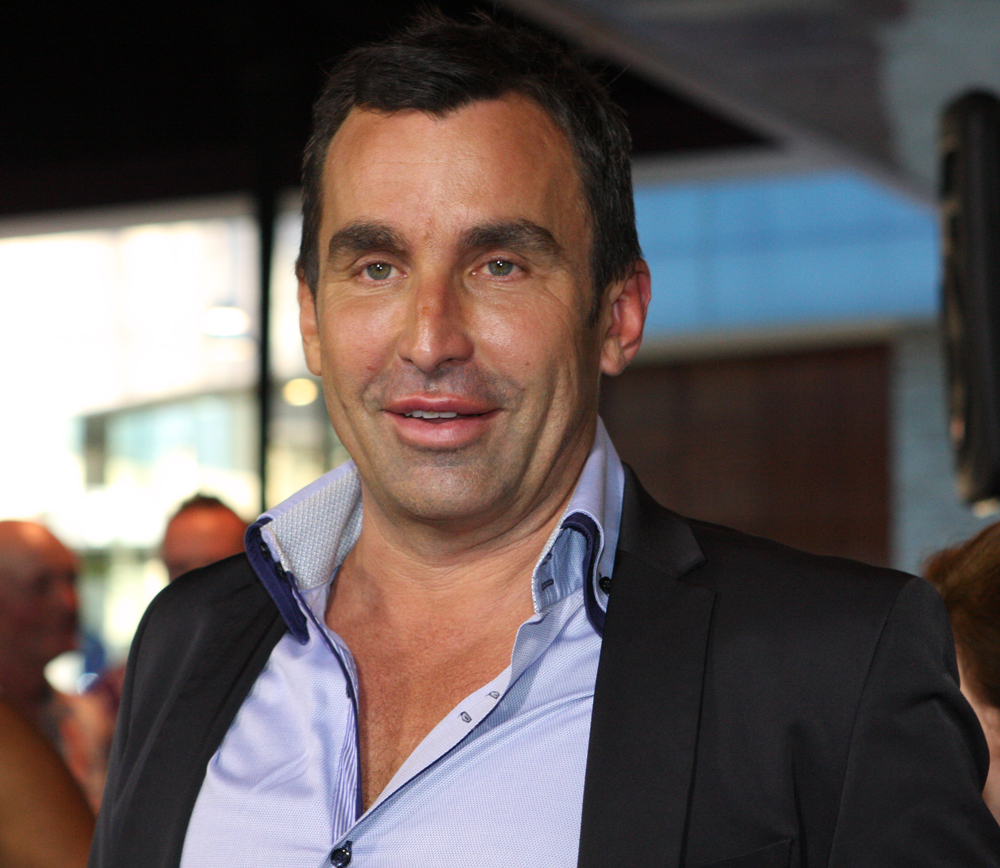
Joh Bailey in January 2012

Joh Bailey (born 1962) is an Australian hair stylist based in Sydney.

== Biography ==
Bailey attended James Ruse Agricultural High School in Sydney. Bailey has supplied his services to well-known people, and works with business partner, Marilyn Koch.

In 1985, the first Joh Bailey hair salon was opened in Double Bay, Sydney. Salons were then opened in the Sydney CBD, Bowral, South Yarra in Melbourne and Bondi Junction. In 2006 Bailey, working with Bush Australia (a division of UK electronics company Alba), launched his own brand of haircare appliances.

In July 2022 Bailey married his long-term partner Michael Christie.
