= Ivan Lee (bishop) =

Australian Anglican bishop (died 2020)

The Right Reverend Ivan Yin Lee
- Bishop of the Western Region
- Church: Anglican Church of Australia
- Diocese: Anglican Diocese of Sydney
- In office: 2003–2019
- Predecessor: Brian King
- Successor: Gary Koo

Orders
- Consecration: 20 December 2002 by Peter Jensen

Personal details
- Born: 1955 or 1956
- Died: 4 March 2020 (aged 63–64)
- Denomination: Anglican
- Education: Moore Theological College

Ivan Yin Lee (1955 or 1956 – 4 March 2020) was an Australian Anglican bishop. He was an assistant bishop in the Anglican Diocese of Sydney, serving from 2003 to 2019 as the Bishop of the Western Region. and then until early 2020, as bishop undertaking a role working on strengthening church growth within the Diocese.

Lee was appointed in 2002 to replace Bishop Brian King. He was the first Anglican bishop in Australia to have a Chinese ethnic background.

== Early life and education ==
Lee's parents immigrated to Australia from Guangzhou province, China, in the 1950s. Lee describes his family as having been culturally Buddhist; he was excused from mandatory Christian religious instruction at James Cook Boys high school along with other non-Christian students. Lee converted to Christianity at a church-run summer camp and later "horrified" his immigrant parents by taking a year off from medical school at the University of New South Wales to study at Moore Theological College. He completed a theology degree instead of returning to medical school.

== Parish ministry ==
Lee served as a presbyter in Manly, Beverly Hills and Merrylands. He worked for eight years as an assistant minister at St Jude's, Carlton, in Melbourne, then became rector of St Aidan's Church in Hurstville Grove.

== Episcopal ministry ==
Lee was elected as bishop of the Western Region in December 2002 by the Diocese of Sydney's standing committee, and was consecrated as bishop on 20 December 2002.

As bishop, Lee took a traditionalist position on the question of women preaching, and on same-sex marriages, stating that, "We don't hold this position as a matter of mere tradition but as the scriptures dictate." Lee was part of the leadership of GAFCON. Lee also took public positions opposing racism and, in particular, criticising the anti-immigration positions taken by Drew Fraser, citing the Bible as his authority that "there is equality between all people".

Lee died on 4 March 2020 after having pancreatic cancer for the previous four years.
