= Graphene foam =

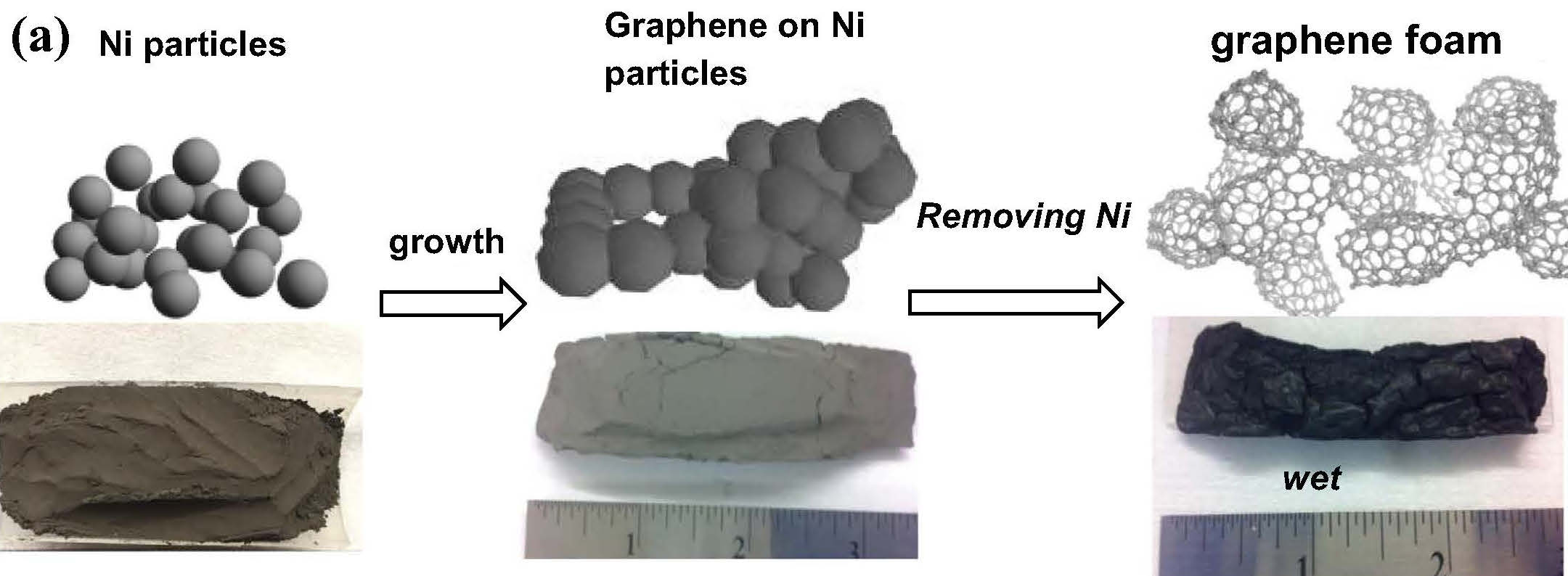
Schematic of the synthesis of graphene foam using a Ni template (top) and photographs of the products (bottom)

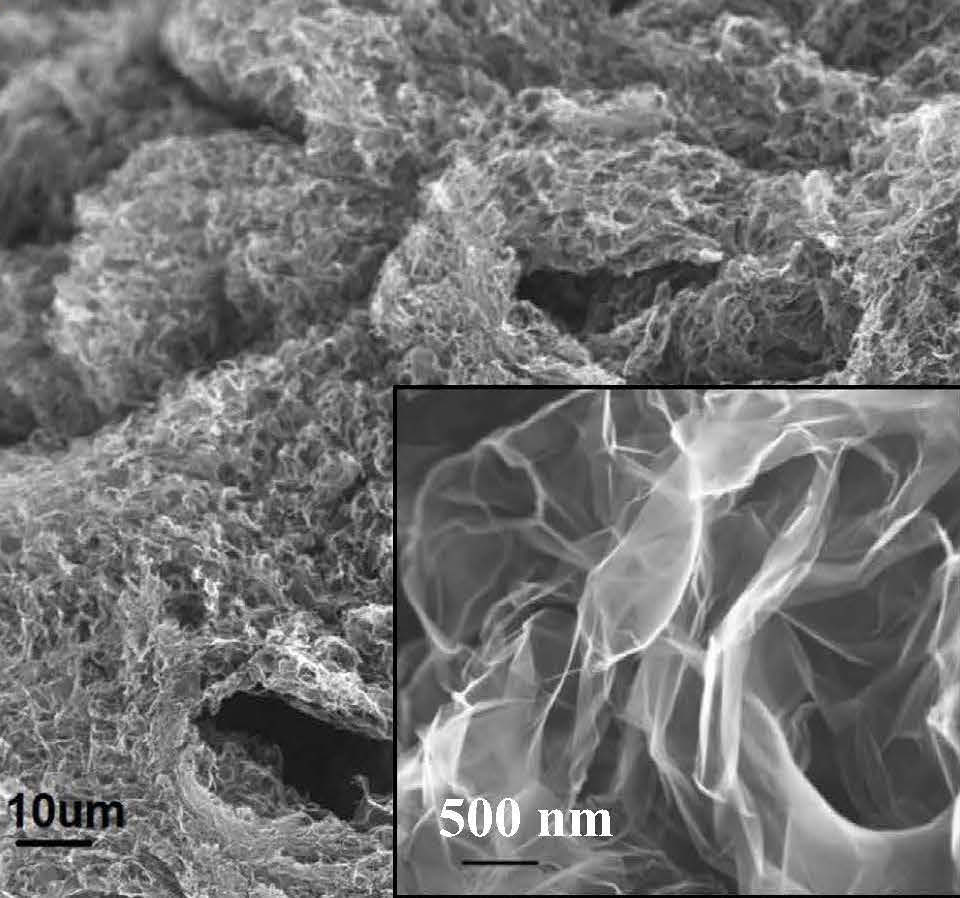
Electron micrographs of the graphene foam prepared using a Ni template

Graphene foam is a solid, open-cell foam made of single-layer sheets of graphene. It is a candidate substrate for the electrode of lithium-ion batteries.

== Synthesis ==
The foam can be manufactured using vapor deposition to coat a metal foam, a three-dimensional mesh of metal filaments. The metal is then removed.

== Applications ==
=== Electrode ===
A physically flexible battery was created using the foam for electrodes. The anode was made by coating the foam with a lithium-titanium compound (Li_{4}Ti_{5}O_{12}) and the cathode by coating the foam with LiFePO_{4}. Both electrodes were lightweight and their large surface area provided high energy density of 110 Wh/kg, comparable to commercial batteries.

Power density was much greater than a typical battery. At a rate that completely discharged the material in 18 seconds, power delivered was 80 percent of what it produced during an hour-long discharge. Performance remained stable through 500 charge/discharge cycles.

=== Support ===
In 2017 researchers used carbon nanotubes to reinforce a foam. The latter material supports 3,000 times its own weight and can return to its original shape when unweighted. Nanotubes, a powdered nickel catalyst and sugar were mixed. Dried pellets of the substance were then compressed in a steel die in the shape of a screw. The nickel was removed, leaving a screw-shaped piece of foam. The nanotubes' outer layers split and bonded with the graphene.

== See also ==
- Aerographene
- Foam
- Lithium-ion battery
