= Jose de Segovia (journalist) =

Spanish teacher, journalist & theologian

Jose de Segovia (Madrid, 1964) is a Spanish teacher, journalist & theologian. He studied journalism at Universidad Complutense (Madrid), theology at University of Kampen (Netherlands) and Bible at The School of Biblical Studies Welwyn (England), where he became interested in the work of preacher Martyn Lloyd-Jones. De Segovia is currently leading active student groups such as European Mission Fellowship, International Fellowship of Evangelical Students and Unión Bíblica. He was also President of the Theological Commission on Spanish Evangelical Alliance between 2001 and 2015 and representative of the World Evangelical Alliance in theological dialogue with the Vatican.

== Teaching ==
De Segovia has taught religious studies at the following schools.

- The School of Biblical Studies Welwyn, England
- Facultad Internacional de Teología Castelldefels, Spain
- Centro Evangélico de Estudios Bíblicos Barcelona, Spain
- Facultad de Teología Protestante Madrid, Spain

== Books ==
Spanish author and historian Cesar Vidal Manzanares wrote that "José de Segovia Barrón write theological opinions and culture reviews in the highest professional level, lighting the topics because of its own particular deep perception of life. Reading often his articles it's a pleasure to me, because his own intellectual approach confirms that the Christian thinking does not stunt the brain but, if it's properly used, mind is actually reinforce and encouraged".

- Bob Dylan. (Andamio, 1985)
- El protestantismo en España: Pasado, presente y futuro (CEM/AMECAN, 1997)
- Guerra Espiritual: Una reflexión Crítica (AEE. Barcelona, 1988)
- Una fe para el tercer milenio (Peregrino Moral de Calatrava, 2002)
- Entrelíneas: Arte y Fe (Consejo Evangélico de Madrid, 2003) Foreword by Cesar Vidal Manzanares
- Ocultismo (Andamio. Barcelona, 2004)
- El príncipe Caspian y la fe de C. S. Lewis (Andamio, 2008)
- Huellas del cristianismo en el cine (Consejo Evangélico de Madrid, 2010)
- El asombro del perdón (Andamio, 2010)
- Center Church Europe (Wijnen, Uitgeverij Van, 2014) Co-Author with Tim Keller (pastor)
- Evangelio según San Lucas para la Unión Bíblica (Unión Bíblica, 2020)
- El legado de John Stott (Editorial Andamio, 2022)
- La mente y el corazón de Tim Keller (Editorial Andamio, 2024)

== Magazines and digital publications ==
During the years de Segovia spent at the University (1983-1988) he became interested in Christian thinkers like C.S. Lewis, Francis Schaeffer and José Grau Balcells, a Spanish writer that he later call his "spiritual father". Historian Gabino Fernández Campos wrote that during these early years, de Segovia was collaborating for Spanish & Dutch magazines like Aura, Panorama Evangélico, Adelante, Cuadernos Reforma, Nederlands Dagblad or Internieuws.

The following are de Segovia's more popular publications:

- Entrelíneas. Printed fanzine including Cesar Vidal Manzanares or Luís Alfredo Díaz-Britos. Madrid, 1985.
- '"Gospel Club". Radio Popular, 1985 and 1987.
- Kalos. Magazine including Jonathan Gelabert. Granollers, 1987.
- Cultura Pop. RNE Radio 3, 1987.
- Entrelíneas. Online magazine including more than 1000 reviews & podcast since 2002.
- Radio Encuentro, including weekly radio interviews since 2010.
- Evangelical Focus, including weekly culture reviews since 2015.

== Personal life ==
De Segovia lives in Madrid with his wife Anneke de Kraker and their 4 children.

He is pastor at Reformed Church in Madrid.

He successfully underwent surgery due to a kidney tumor on July 1, 2020.
