= Tim Keller (pastor) =

American pastor and theologian (1950–2023)

The Reverend Tim Keller
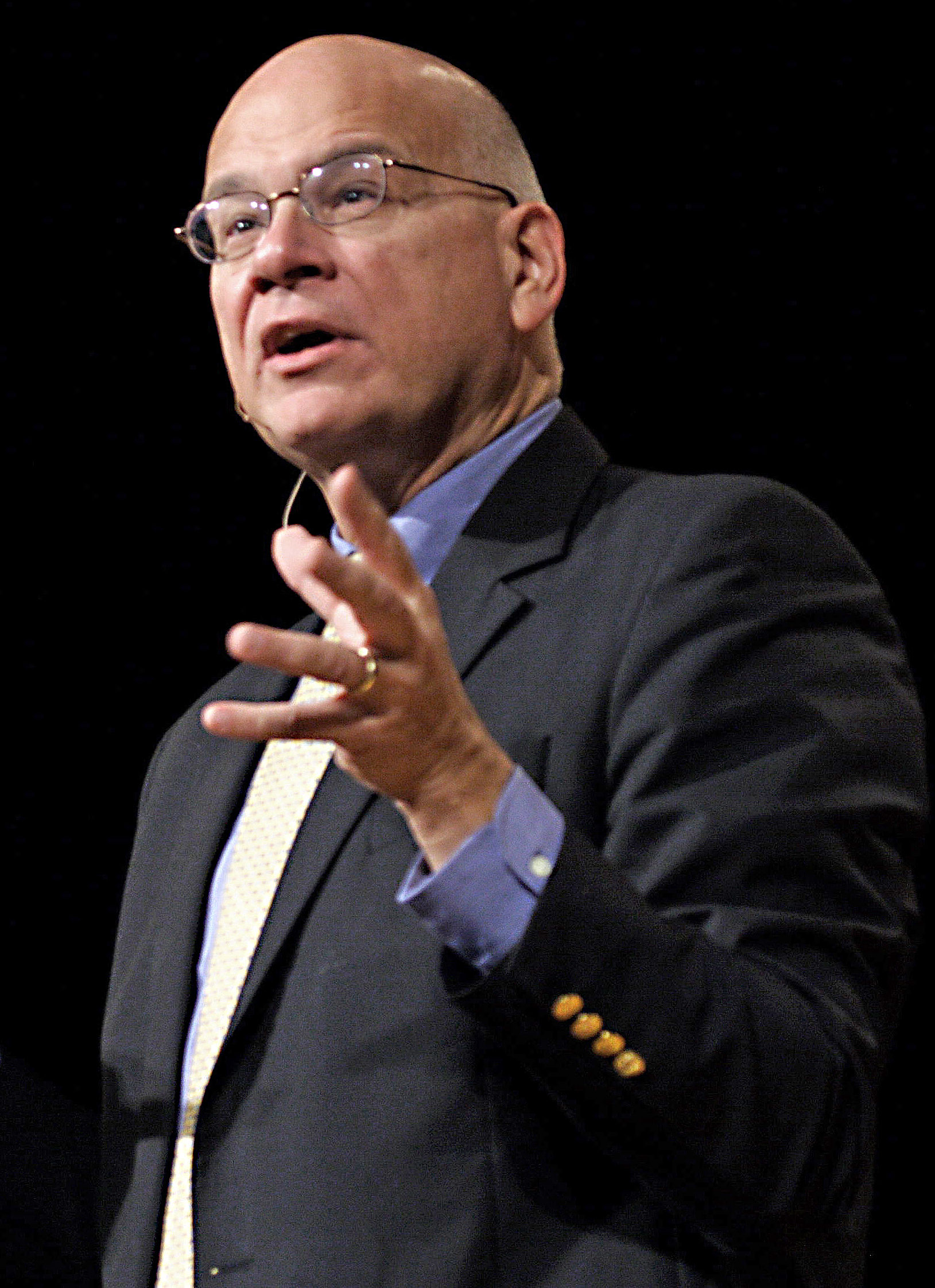
- Keller in 2006
- Born: Timothy James Keller; September 23, 1950; Allentown, Pennsylvania, U.S.
- Died: May 19, 2023 (aged 72); New York City, U.S.
- Education: Bucknell University (BA); Gordon-Conwell Theological Seminary (MDiv); Westminster Theological Seminary (DMin)
- Occupations: Minister and author
- Spouse: Kathy Louise Keller (m. 1975)
- Children: 3

Ecclesiastical career
- Ordained: Presbyterian Church in America

Religious life
- Religion: Christianity
- Denomination: Presbyterian Church in America (Presbyterian)
- Church: Redeemer Presbyterian Church
- Profession: Pastor
- Website: timothykeller.com

Timothy James Keller (September 23, 1950 – May 19, 2023) was an American Presbyterian pastor, Reformed theologian, and Christian apologist. He was the chairman and co-founder of Redeemer City to City, which trains pastors for service around the world. Keller was also the founding pastor of Redeemer Presbyterian Church in New York City and the author of The New York Times bestselling books The Prodigal God (2008), Prayer (2014), and The Reason for God (2008). The prequel for the latter is Making Sense of God (2016).

== Early life and education ==
Timothy James Keller was born in Allentown, Pennsylvania, on September 23, 1950, to Louise A. Keller (née Clemente) and William B. Keller, a television advertising manager. His Italian-American mother baptized him as a Catholic.

Keller was a graduate of Bucknell University (BA, 1972), Gordon-Conwell Theological Seminary (M.Div., 1975) and Westminster Theological Seminary, where he received his D.Min. in 1981 under the supervision of Harvie M. Conn. Keller attended the Lutheran Church in America during his upbringing. At Bucknell, he joined the campus fellowship InterVarsity Christian Fellowship and during Seminary was an associate staff member at Framingham college in Massachusetts.

== Career ==
Keller was ordained by the Presbyterian Church in America (PCA). He served as a pastor at West Hopewell Presbyterian Church in Hopewell, Virginia, for nine years while also serving as director of church planting for the PCA. Keller also served on the faculty of Westminster Theological Seminary in Philadelphia, where he and his wife Kathy were involved in urban ministry.

=== Redeemer Presbyterian Church ===
Keller was recruited by his denomination to start Redeemer Presbyterian Church in Manhattan in 1989 after two others had turned down the position.

In 2008, Keller published his first book since his 1989 report to his denomination on diaconal ministries, Ministries of Mercy. The book, The Reason for God, was based on common objections to the Christian faith heard during his ministry in New York City. The book reached seventh on the New York Times Nonfiction bestseller list.

Redeemer Presbyterian Church grew from 50 people to a total attendance of over 5,000 people each Sunday as of 2008, leading some to call Keller "the most successful Christian evangelist in the city". In 2004, Christianity Today praised Redeemer as "one of Manhattan's most vital congregations".

The church's emphasis on young urban professionals, whom Keller believed exhibit disproportionate influence over the culture and its ideas, has given the church an unusual makeup for a US megachurch. The majority of the congregation is made up of single adults; it is also over forty percent Asian-American, and has many congregants working in the arts and financial services. In his preaching, "he hardly shrinks from difficult Christian truths, [but] he sounds different from many of the shrill evangelical voices in the public sphere." Keller often critiqued both the Republican and Democrat political parties and avoided taking public stances on political issues, resulting in a politically centrist church.

Redeemer Presbyterian Church has also founded Hope for New York, a non-profit organization that sends volunteers and grants to over 40 faith-based ministries serving social needs in New York City; the Center for Faith and Work, to train professionals in Christian theology; and Redeemer City to City, to train and fund pastors in New York and other cities.

Keller was a co-founder of The Gospel Coalition, a group of Reformed leaders from around the United States. His mentoring of younger church leaders, such as Scott Sauls in Nashville and Steve Chong in Sydney, increased his influence globally.

On July 1, 2017, Keller stepped down from his role as senior pastor of Redeemer Presbyterian Church. The move was part of a larger vision to shift his efforts from preaching to training the next generation of church leaders and starting new churches in global cities through Redeemer City to City.

== Theological views ==
Keller shunned the label "evangelical" because of its political and fundamentalist connotation, preferring to call himself orthodox because "he believes in the importance of personal conversion or being 'born again,' and the full authority of the Bible." He identified with Calvinist theology, although he had been critiqued by some in that tradition for his interpretation of its doctrines. He was described as a "doctrine-friendly emerging pastor".

=== Gospel versus religion ===
The centerpiece and underpinning of Keller's ministry was his teaching of the doctrine of the gospel, emphasizing the doctrines of total depravity, unmerited grace and substitutionary atonement. This teaching is summarized in his oft-used explanation, "The gospel is this: We are more sinful and flawed in ourselves than we ever dared believe, yet at the very same time we are more loved and accepted in Jesus Christ than we ever dared hope." This understanding of the gospel is contrasted to what Keller called "traditional religion" (which he defines as a set of rules, rituals or actions that enable an individual to earn salvation or favor with God) as well as "irreligion" (which he defines as the belief that there is no God or no need for his favor). This has been referred to as a "gospel third way", or "gospel-centered" approach. Typical of this teaching is his interpretation of the Parable of the Prodigal Son (see The Prodigal God), based on a teaching of one of Keller's mentors, Edmund Clowney.

=== Apologetics ===
Keller's preaching and writing in his apologetics is characterized by a respectful orientation towards an educated and skeptical audience outside the faith. His most explicit work on the subject was The Reason for God, which he attributed to thousands of conversations with skeptical New Yorkers over the course of his ministry (Reason, p. xix).

On creationism, Keller stated that his view is not strictly literal and that evolution is "neither ruled in nor ruled out" in his church. Keller wrote on the topic for the BioLogos Foundation.

Keller's major influences in apologetics included C. S. Lewis, Cornelius Van Til, John Stott, Alvin Plantinga, N. T. Wright, and Miroslav Volf.

=== Idolatry ===
Another central theme in Keller's teaching was idolatry, based on the teachings of Martin Luther, and John Calvin, the Ten Commandments, and other parts of the Bible. Keller stated that idol worship is a contemporary phenomenon, that it continues today in the form of an addiction or devotion to money, career, sex, power and anything to which people seek to give significance and satisfaction in life other than God (detailed in his book Counterfeit Gods).

=== Politics ===
Keller criticized the evangelical alliance with Republicans and argued that Christianity is a much broader global movement that agrees with some liberal and some conservative issues, and critiqued them both. He argued for giving to charitable causes and caring for the needs of the poor, based on biblical texts such as the Torah and the parable of the Good Samaritan.

=== Cultural engagement ===
Attributed partly to his congregation of upwardly mobile Manhattanites, Keller was a leader in applying Christian theology to secular vocations such as business, art and entrepreneurship. The Center for Faith and Work at Redeemer has sponsored business competitions and theological education for working professionals. His views on Christianity and culture are outlined in his books Every Good Endeavor and Center Church.

Keller was an avid fan of the work of C. S. Lewis and J. R. R. Tolkien, both well-known Christian authors, and also supported the Harry Potter novels.

=== Sex and gender ===
Keller held a complementarian view of gender that believes that the Bible teaches defined roles for both genders, but the specific duties accompanying each gender's role are undefined. He held that "Marriage provides the personal growth that comes through cross-gender relationships." Keller elaborated on the biblical view of sex and marriage in his book The Meaning of Marriage and believed homosexual sexual behavior is inconsistent with Scripture. Keller was a signatory of the Manhattan Declaration and was opposed to abortion, but not opposed to contraception.

=== Cities and urban church planting ===
While at Westminster Theological Seminary, Keller was mentored by Harvie Conn, an early advocate of ministry in urban centers. Keller was recruited to start Redeemer Presbyterian Church due to a shortage of biblically orthodox churches in center-city Manhattan. He delivered a plenary address on the subject at the Lausanne Conference of 2010.

Through Redeemer City to City, Keller mentored and chaired a network of center-city churches that represents similar ministry values worldwide. He wrote extensively on the importance of cities and gave a biblical theological framework for ministry in cities in his book on ministry, Center Church.

== Personal life ==
Keller married Kathy Kristy in 1975; they had three children. Keller suffered from thyroid cancer in 2002.

Keller had a brother, William "Billy" Keller, who died of aids in 1998. Keller famously counselled his brother while in hospice care, leading him to Christ before he died. Keller preached the eulogy of his brother's funeral.

Keller credited cancer and the possibility of death as the pivotal point for the transformation of his prayer life, forcing him to be still and meditate in an otherwise hectic life.

== Death ==
In June 2020, Keller revealed that he had been diagnosed with pancreatic cancer. Keller died under hospice care at home in Manhattan on May 19, 2023, at age 72.

A memorial service was held for Keller in August 2023 at St. Patrick's Cathedral in Manhattan. He was buried in St. Michael's Cemetery near LaGuardia Airport in Queens.

== Books ==
- Resources for Deacons: Love Expressed through Mercy Ministries (Christian Education and Publications, 1985) ISBN 0-9703541-6-9
- Ministries of Mercy: The Call of the Jericho Road (P&R Publishing, 1997) ISBN 0-87552-217-3
- Church Planter Manual (Redeemer Presbyterian Church, 2002)
- The Reason for God: Belief in an Age of Skepticism (Dutton Adult, February 2008) ISBN 0-525-95049-4
- The Prodigal God: Recovering the Heart of the Christian Faith (Dutton Adult, November 2008) ISBN 0-525-95079-6
- Counterfeit Gods: The Empty Promises of Money, Sex, and Power, and the Only Hope that Matters (Dutton Adult, October 2009) ISBN 0-525-95136-9
- Generous Justice: How God's Grace Makes Us Just (Dutton Adult, November 2010) ISBN 0-525-95190-3
- King's Cross: The Story of the World in the Life of Jesus (Dutton Adult, February 2011) ISBN 0-525-95210-1
- The Meaning of Marriage: Facing the Complexities of Commitment with the Wisdom of God (Dutton Adult, November 2011) ISBN 0-525-95247-0
- The Freedom of Self Forgetfulness: The Path to True Christian Joy (10Publishing, March 2012) ISBN 978-1906173418
- Center Church: Doing Balanced, Gospel-Centered Ministry in Your City (Zondervan, September 2012) ISBN 0-310-494184
- Every Good Endeavor: Connecting Your Work to God's Work (Dutton, November 2012) ISBN 978-0-525-95270-1
- Galatians For You (The Good Book Company, February 2013) ISBN 978-1908762573
- Judges For You (The Good Book Company, August 2013) ISBN 978-1908762900
- Walking with God through Pain and Suffering (Dutton, October 2013) ISBN 978-0-525-95245-9
- Encounters with Jesus: Unexpected Answers to Life's Biggest Questions (Dutton, 2013) ISBN 978-0-525-95435-4
- Romans 1–7 For You (The Good Book Company, February 2014) ISBN 978-1908762917
- Prayer: Experiencing Awe and Intimacy with God (Dutton, 2014) ISBN 978-0-525-95414-9
- Center Church Europe (Wijnen, Uitgeverij Van, 2014) Contributors are José de Segovia, Leonardo De Chirico, Michael Herbst, Frank Hinkelmann, Martin de Jong, Jens Bruun Kofoed, Daniel Liechti, András Lovas, David Novak, Stefan Paas and Martin Reppenhagen. ISBN 978-9-051-94480-8
- Romans 8–16 For You (The Good Book Company, February 2015) ISBN 978-1910307298
- Preaching: Communicating Faith in an Age of Skepticism (Viking, June 2015) ISBN 978-0-525-95303-6
- The Songs of Jesus: A Year of Daily Devotionals in the Psalms (Viking, November 2015) ISBN 978-0-525-95514-6
- Making Sense of GOD: An Invitation to the Skeptical Viking ISBN 9780525954156 ebk. ISBN 9780698194366
- Hidden Christmas: The Surprising Truth Behind the Birth of Christ (Viking, Nov 2016) ISBN 978-0735221659
- God's Wisdom for Navigating Life: A Year of Daily Devotions in the Book of Proverbs (Viking, Nov 2017) ISBN 978-0735222090
- The Prodigal Prophet: Jonah and the Mystery of God's Mercy (Viking, Oct 2018) ISBN 978-0735222069
- The Meaning of Marriage: A Couple's Devotional: A Year of Daily Devotions (Viking, Nov 2019) ISBN 978-0525560777
- How to Reach the West Again (Redeemer City to City, 2020) ISBN 978-0578633756
- On Birth (Penguin Books, 2020) ISBN 978-0143135357
- On Marriage (Penguin Books, 2020) ISBN 978-0143135364
- On Death (Penguin Books, 2020) ISBN 978-0143135371
- Hope in Times of Fear: The Resurrection and the Meaning of Easter (Viking, March 9, 2021) ISBN 978-0525560791, 0525560793
- Forgive: Why Should I and How Can I? (Viking, November 1, 2022) ISBN 9780525560746

=== Contributions in edited volumes ===
- "Puritan Resources for Biblical Counseling". The Journal of Pastoral Practice. 9 (3): 11–44. 1988.
- Schaller, Lyle E, ed. (1993), Center City Churches: The New Urban Frontier, Abingdon Press, ISBN 0-687-04802-8.
- "Preaching to the Secular Mind". The Journal of Biblical Counseling. 14 (1): 54–62. Fall 1995.
- Bustard, Ned, ed. (2000), It Was Good: Making Art to the Glory of God, Square Halo Books, ISBN 978-0-9785097-1-2.
- Carson, DA, ed. (2002), Worship by the Book, Zondervan, ISBN 0-310-21625-7.
- Piper, John; Taylor, Justin, eds. (2007), The Supremacy of Christ in a Postmodern World, Crossway Books, ISBN 978-1-58134-922-1.
- Willard, Dallas, ed. (2010), A Place for Truth: Leading Thinkers Explore Life's Hardest Questions, IVP Books, ISBN 978-0-8308-3845-5
- Cunningham, Richard, ed. (2017), Serving the Church, Reaching the World: Essays in Honour of Don Carson, IVP UK, ISBN 978-1-7835-9593-8
- Keller, Tim; Inazu, John, eds. (2020), Uncommon Ground: Living Faithfully in a World of Difference, Nelson Books, ISBN 978-1-4002-1960-5.

== Interviews ==
- Amanpour, Christiane (2011). Interview with Pastor Tim Keller, ABC News This Week, April 24.
- Barkhorn, Eleanor (2011), "How Timothy Keller Spreads the Gospel in New York City, and Beyond" The Atlantic, February 21, 2011.
- Bechelder, Kate (2014), "God Isn't Dead in Gotham" Wall Street Journal, December 20–21, 2014.
- Kristof, Nicholas (2016). "Pastor, Am I a Christian?" New York Times, December 25, p. SR19.
- Wehner, Peter (2019). "The Moral Universe of Timothy Keller" The Atlantic, December 5, 2019.
- Lee, Sophia (2021). "Pastoring the City" World Magazine, December 9, 2021.
- Bobrow, Emily (2022). "Pastor Timothy Keller Speaks to the Head and the Heart" Wall Street Journal, September 2, 2022.
