= Gordon Begbie =

Anglican assistant bishop

Herbert Gordon Smirnoff Begbie (28 October 1905 – 7 June 1973) was an assistant bishop in the Anglican Diocese of Sydney.

Begbie was born into an ecclesiastical family and educated at Trinity Grammar School, Sydney, the University of Sydney and Moore Theological College. He was ordained in 1929 and was a curate in Eastwood and Hobart. After this he held incumbencies in Narrabeen, Moss Vale and Campsie. Later he was Archdeacon of Camden, Wollongong and then Cumberland. He was the diocese's registrar from 1960 and its Western Region bishop (based in Parramatta and called Bishop of Parramatta) from 1967.
