= Chris Edwards (bishop) =

Bishop of North Sydney

The Right Reverend Chris Edwards
- Bishop of the Northern Region
- Church: Anglican Church of Australia
- Province: Province of New South Wales
- Diocese: Diocese of Sydney
- Installed: 5 May 2014
- Predecessor: Glenn Davies

Orders
- Ordination: 1994
- Consecration: 29 March 2014 by Glenn Davies

Personal details
- Born: Christopher Edwards; 1961 (age 64–65)
- Denomination: Anglicanism
- Spouse: Belinda
- Children: Timothy and Nicole Edwards
- Education: University of Technology Sydney; Moore Theological College

Christopher Edwards (born 1961) is an Australian Anglican bishop who has served as the Bishop of North Sydney (Bishop of the Northern Region) in the Diocese of Sydney since 5 May 2014.

== Early life and ministry ==
Edwards grew up in Lalor Park in Sydney. His father was commissioned to work with the Church Army. Edwards was educated at James Ruse Agricultural High School and the University of Technology Sydney, then worked as an executive in the finance and banking sector for a time, before training for the ministry at Moore Theological College. In 1994 Edwards was ordained and became a curate at St George's, Engadine.

Edwards was appointed to the staff of Holy Trinity Church, Adelaide, and later founded its church plant in the Adelaide Hills, during which time its congregation grew more than tenfold under his leadership. He then accepted a rector's position at St Paul's Tervuren in Belgium (in the Diocese in Europe). and chaired the associated primary school. His most recent position prior to his ordination as bishop was as Director of Mission at Anglican Retirement Villages (now Anglicare), Sydney.

== Episcopal ministry ==
On 11 November 2013, Edwards was appointed by Archbishop Glenn Davies and endorsed by the diocese's Standing Committee as the next Bishop of North Sydney (Bishop of the Northern Region). Edwards was to succeed Davies in that position, following his appointment as archbishop earlier that year. The diocese spoke of Edwards' leadership in parishes in Sydney, Adelaide and Belgium, the Arrow Leadership program in South Australia, African Enterprise in Belgium, a British Primary School in Belgium, a mission society (RETRAK) in Belgium, and Anglican Retirement Villages as some of the reasons for his appointment.

Edwards was consecrated bishop by Davies in St Andrew's Cathedral, Sydney on 29 March 2014, and commenced working in the position from 5 May 2014.

As Bishop of North Sydney, Edwards oversees 64 parishes north of Sydney Harbour, including some of the diocese's largest churches and multicultural ministries.

Edwards was one of four nominees to replace Glenn Davies as Anglican Archbishop of Sydney at a special election Synod in May 2021. He was eliminated in the first round of voting.

== Personal life ==
Edwards is married to Belinda and has 2 children.

Anglican Communion titles
Preceded by Glenn Davies	Bishop of North Sydney; 2013–present	Incumbent
