= Redeemer Presbyterian Church =

Church in Manhattan, New York

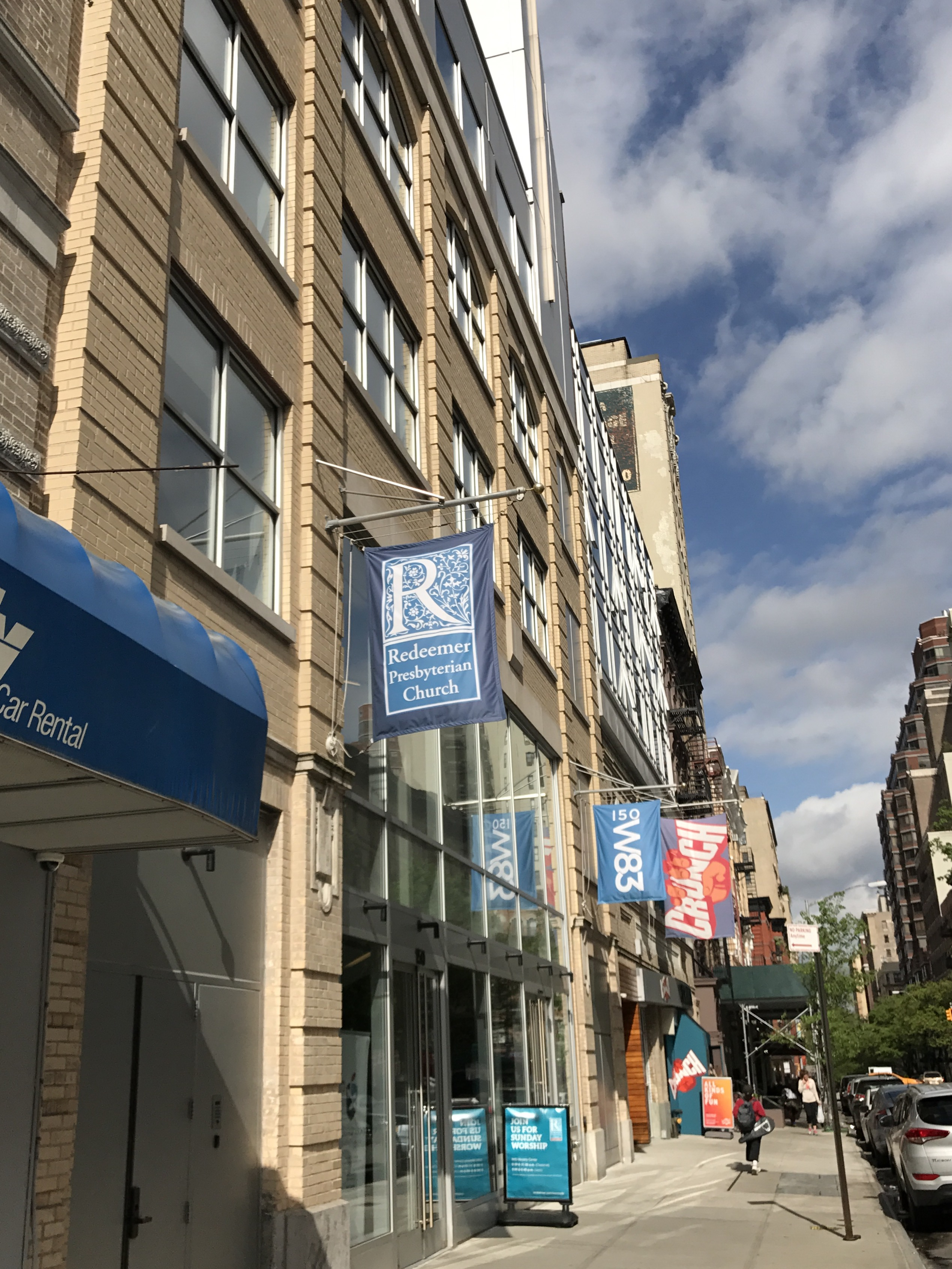
- 150 West 83rd Street, home to Redeemer's Upper West Side location
- Redeemer Presbyterian Church
- 40.756576°N 73.985968°W
- Location: New York City
- Country: United States
- Denomination: Presbyterian Church in America
- Website: redeemer.com

History
- Founded: 1989

Redeemer Presbyterian Church is a church located in New York City, founded in 1989 by Timothy J. Keller, who retired as pastor in July 2017. It is part of the Presbyterian Church in America. The family of Redeemer churches includes Redeemer Downtown, Redeemer West Side, Redeemer East Side, Redeemer Lincoln Square, and Redeemer East Harlem. Christianity Today called Redeemer "one of Manhattan's most vital congregations."

== History ==
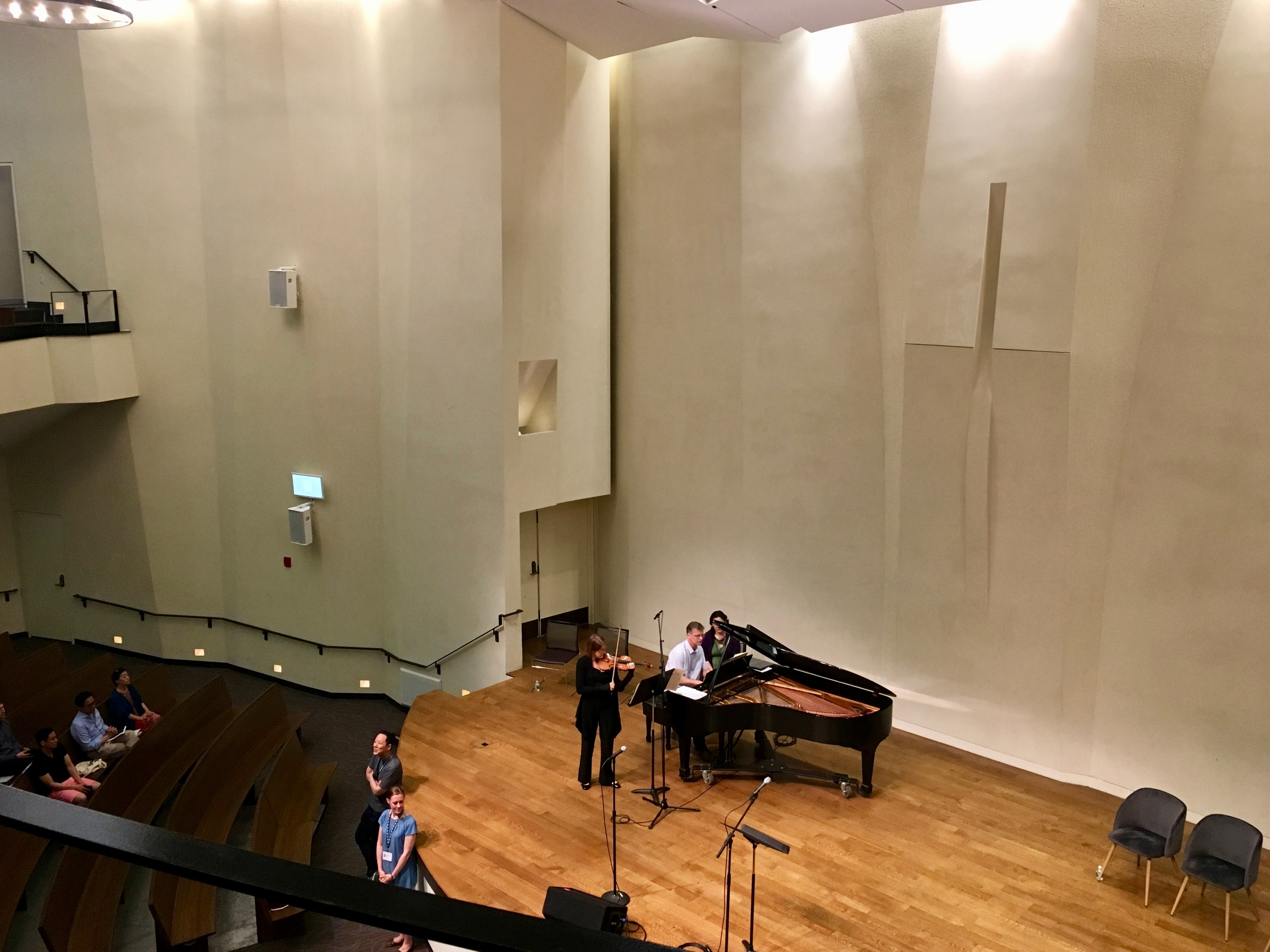
The auditorium of the W83 ministry center

Redeemer draws around 5,000 people to its services each Sunday at venues on the Upper West Side, Upper East Side, Lincoln Square, East Harlem and Downtown. According to the church's 2014 annual report, the current total membership is 1,760. In a 2006 survey of 2,000 American Protestant church leaders, Redeemer was named the #16 most influential church in America. Redeemer has attracted members of the public such as young professionals, doctors, bankers, lawyers, artists, actors, musicians, and designers, many of whom are in their 20s and 30s.

Through its church planting center, Redeemer has helped start over 100 smaller churches in the New York metropolitan area. Redeemer City to City was founded in 2001. With respect to planting and starting new churches in urban areas, The New York Times reported that "pastors from around the world are beginning to come in a steady stream to New York City to glean what they can from Dr. Keller and Redeemer." In 2012, the church bought a parking garage at 150 West 83rd Street on the Upper West Side for conversion to a church building of its own. Redeemer Downtown, Redeemer Lincoln Square, and HFNY share an office at 1500 Broadway.
