= Assistant bishops in the Diocese of Sydney =

Australian assistant bishops

The assistant bishops of Sydney are the assistant bishops in the Anglican Diocese of Sydney, Australia. They each assist the Archbishop of Sydney by maintaining delegated episcopal oversight over a particular geographical area.

Prior to the formation of the current "regions" arrangement in around 1967, the archbishop was assisted by a number of suffragan bishops with no particular geographical area (nor expectation to succeed to the diocesan see). The first regional see created was that of Parramatta, whose first assistant bishop was consecrated in 1967. In 1969, the first Bishop of Wollongong was consecrated. The Southern (aka South Sydney) and North regions followed in 1972 and 1975 respectively. In 1993, the fifth regional see, Georges River, was created.

Effective from 1 July 2021, the regions were changed to plan for Sydney's future growth in the southwestern areas. As part of this change:

- five parishes in the Hills District (Castle Hill, Glenhaven, Dural, Cherrybrook and West Pennant Hills) were moved from the Western Region to Northern Region
- seven parishes in the Canterbury-Bankstown and St George areas (Sans Souci, Kogarah, Brighton-Rockdale, Bayside, Marrickville, Earlwood and Canterbury) were moved from the Georges River Region to Southern Region
- 13 parishes in the Macarthur area (Camden, Campbelltown, Cobbity, Denham Court, Eagle Vale, Ingleburn, Menangle, Minto, Narellan, Oran Park, Rosemeadow, South Creek and The Oaks) were moved from the Wollongong Region to Georges River Region.

To reflect the new regional boundaries and the fact that the Georges River Region had moved away from that area, the Georges River Region was renamed to the "South Western Region".

== Suffragan bishops of Sydney ==
Bishops coadjutor of Sydney
From	Until	Incumbent	Notes
1926	1932	Gerard D'Arcy-Irvine	Died in office.
1932	1935	Sydney Kirkby	Died in office.
1935	1961	Venn Pilcher	Died in office.
1940	1960	William Hilliard	Translated from Nelson; died in office.
1956	1965	Clive Kerle	Translated to Armidale.
1958	1966	Marcus Loane	Became Archbishop of Sydney.
1960	1964	Goodwin Hudson	Returned to the United Kingdom.
1965	1975	Frank Hulme-Moir	Translated from Nelson; also Bishop to the Forces 1965–1979
1965	1982	Jack Dain	CEO & Senior Assistant Bishop from 1980
1975	1993	Donald Cameron	Bishop of North Sydney (1983–1990); diocesan Registrar (1990–1993)

== Bishops of the Western Region ==
The Western Region of the diocese, formed in 1967, is based in Parramatta – hence previous bishops have been more commonly known as the Bishop of Parramatta (until around 1993). The Bishop's seat is St John's Cathedral, Parramatta. The Region covers parishes west of Strathfield out to the Blue Mountains and Lithgow. The bishop is often known as the "Bishop of Western Sydney".

Bishops of Parramatta
From	Until	Incumbent	Notes
1967	1972	Gordon Begbie	Died in office.
1973	1982	Donald Robinson	Became Archbishop of Sydney.
1982	1989	Ken Short	Translated from Wollongong; also Bishop to the Forces
1989	1993	Peter Watson	Translated to the Southern region and later to Melbourne.
Bishops of the Western Region
1993	2002	Brian King	Also Bishop to the Armed Forces.
2003	2019	Ivan Lee	
2019	present	Gary Koo	Installation, 20 December 2019

== Bishops of Wollongong ==
The Wollongong Region, created around 1969, covers the Sutherland Shire, Wollongong, Kiama, Shoalhaven and the Southern Highlands. Until 2021 it also covered the Camden and Campbelltown areas. St Michael's Cathedral, Wollongong lies within the region.

Bishops of Wollongong
From	Until	Incumbent	Notes
1969	1974	Graham Delbridge	Translated to Gippsland.
1975	1982	Ken Short	Translated to Parramatta; also Bishop to the Forces from 1979
1982	1993	Harry Goodhew	Became Archbishop of Sydney.
1993	2006	Reg Piper	
2007	2010	Al Stewart	
2010	present	Peter Hayward	

== Bishops of the Southern Region ==
The Southern Region extends from the edge of the Pacific Ocean in the east to Strathfield and Concord in the west and from the southern shore of Port Jackson across to the northern and western parts of Botany Bay. The bishop is often referred to as the Bishop of South Sydney.

Bishops of the Southern Region
From	Until	Incumbent	Notes
1972	1993	John Reid	
1993	2000	Peter Watson	Translated from Parramatta; translated to Melbourne.
2000	2015	Robert Forsyth	
2015	present	Michael Stead	

== Bishops of the Northern Region ==
The Northern Region covers from Port Jackson to the Hawkesbury River and from the Hills District to Palm Beach. The bishop is also sometimes called Bishop of North Sydney.

Bishops of the Northern Region
From	Until	Incumbent	Notes
1975	1990	Donald Cameron	afterward diocesan Registrar (& asst bishop)
1990	2001	Paul Barnett	
2002	2013	Glenn Davies	Elected Archbishop of Sydney.
2013		Chris Edwards	

== Bishops of the South Western Region (formerly the Georges River Region) ==
The South Western Region covers the south-western areas of Sydney stretching from Campsie to Campbelltown and including Liverpool, Bankstown and Fairfield. Prior to changes in 2021 the areas in the eastern Canterbury-Bankstown and Bayside areas (which are now part of the Southern Region) were also included. When created in 1993, the bishop was referred to as the "Bishop of Liverpool" (although that title was less convenient due to the existence of an Anglican Bishop of Liverpool in England), and from 2013 until 2021 was then known as the "Bishop of Georges River".

Bishops of the South Western Region
From	Until	Incumbent	Notes
1993	2001	Ray Smith	Bishop of Liverpool
2001	2009	Peter Tasker	Bishop of Liverpool 2001–2009; Acting Bishop of Georges River, 2013–2014
2015		Peter Lin	Previously Rector of Fairfield with Bossley Park. Known as Bishop of Georges River until 2021.

== Bishops for International Relations ==
The Bishop for International Relations represents the Archbishop at consecrations and conferences, and makes pastoral visits across the globe to represent the Diocese.

Bishops for International Relations
From	Until	Incumbent	Notes
2009	2019	Peter Tasker	Bishop of Liverpool, 2001–2009; Acting Bishop of Georges River, 2013–2014
2019		Malcolm Richards	
