= Glenn Davies =

Australian Anglican bishop (born 1950)

The Right Reverend Glenn Davies
- Archbishop of Sydney
- Church: Anglican Church of Australia
- Province: New South Wales
- Diocese: Sydney
- In office: 23 August 2013 – 26 March 2021
- Predecessor: Peter Jensen
- Successor: Kanishka Raffel
- Other posts: Bishop of the Diocese of the Southern Cross (2022–present); Bishop of North Sydney (2002–2014)

Orders
- Ordination: 1981 (deacon) · ? (priest) by Sir Marcus Loane
- Consecration: 21 December 2001

Personal details
- Born: Glenn Naunton Davies; 26 September 1950 (age 76)
- Denomination: Anglicanism
- Education: Westminster Theological Seminary; Moore Theological College; University of Sheffield; University of Sydney

Glenn Naunton Davies (born 1950) is an Australian Anglican bishop. Since August 2022 he has served as bishop of the Diocese of the Southern Cross, an Anglican diocese set up outside of the Anglican Church of Australia. He previously served as the Archbishop of Sydney and Metropolitan of the Province of New South Wales in the Anglican Church of Australia from 23 August 2013 to 26 March 2021.

== Early life and education ==
Davies was born on 26 September 1950. He was educated at Shore School, the University of Sydney, Westminster Theological Seminary, Moore Theological College and the University of Sheffield.

== Ordained ministry ==
Davies was ordained in 1981 and began his ordained ministry as a curate at St Stephen's, Willoughby. He was then a lecturer at Moore Theological College until 1995 and rector of St Luke's, Miranda. He has been the canon theologian of the Diocese of Ballarat.

Davies was the Bishop of the North Region (of Sydney) from 2002 to 2014.

In 2013, he was nominated by 182 members of synod for Archbishop of Sydney. He was subsequently elected and became the archbishop-elect on 6 August 2013. His installation service was held on 23 August 2013.

== Controversy and stances on issues ==
Davies took conservative stances on issues of morality. He directed criticism at church branches that had moved to bless same-sex unions, such as the Anglican Diocese of Wangaratta in Victoria.

In October 2019, in his presidential address to the synod of the Anglican Diocese of Sydney, Davies advised those who wanted to change the doctrine of the Anglican Church of Australia to allow the blessing of same-sex marriage to leave the church. These comments were criticised by some within the church who want it to be more inclusive. In response, Davies indicated that his comments were directed at those who wanted to change church doctrine and not to members of congregations or those who identified as gay.

He said: "I fear for the stability of the Anglican Church of Australia. These developments have the potential to fracture our fellowship and impair our communion. I have stated this on numerous occasions at the annual National Bishops' Conference, but sadly to little effect. My own view is that if people wish to change the doctrine of our church, they should start a new church or join a church more aligned to their views – but do not ruin the Anglican Church by abandoning the plain teaching of Scripture. Please leave us."

This hardline stance caused the Anglican Church to split in Australia in 2022, with a breakaway "Diocese of the Southern Cross" having conservative elements of the church leaving the parent church. On 15 August 2022, it was announced that Glenn Davies would be the first bishop of the new Diocese of the Southern Cross set up by GAFCON Australia.

== Decorations ==
Davies is a recipient of the Centenary Medal.

== Publications ==
Davies is the author of Faith and Obedience in Romans (1989, Sheffield Academic Press) as well as numerous journal articles and essays.

Anglican Communion titles
Preceded by Paul Barnett	Bishop of North Sydney; 2002–2013	Succeeded by Chris Edwards
Preceded by Peter Jensen	Archbishop of Sydney; 2013–2021	Succeeded by Kanishka Raffel
