= List of English-language book publishing companies =

List Wikipedia article

This is a list of English-language book publishers. It includes imprints of larger publishing groups, which may have resulted from business mergers. Included are academic publishers, technical manual publishers, publishers for the traditional book trade (both for adults and children), religious publishers, and small press publishers, among other types. The list includes defunct publishers. It does not include businesses that are exclusively printers/manufacturers, vanity presses (publishing and distributing books for a fee), or book packagers.

== 0–9 ==
- 1517 Media – official publishing house of the Evangelical Lutheran Church in America
- 37 INK – an imprint of Atria

== A ==
- A & C Black – now an imprint of Bloomsbury Publishing
- A. C. McClurg
- A. S. Barnes & Co. – founded by Alfred Smith Barnes
- Abilene Christian University Press
- Ablex Publishing – an imprint of Elsevier
- Abrams Books
- Academic Press – UK publisher; now an imprint of Elsevier
- Ace Books – an imprint of Penguin Group
- AcePremier Book
- Addison-Wesley – an imprint of Pearson Education
- Adis International – an imprint of Wolters Kluwer
- Akashic Books – independent small press; known for its noir series
- Aladdin Paperbacks – a children's fiction imprint of Simon & Schuster
- Alfred A. Knopf
- Allen & Unwin
- Allison & Busby
- Alma Books
- Alyson Books
- American Graphics Institute
- And Other Stories
- André Deutsch – an imprint of the Carlton Publishing Group
- Andrews McMeel Publishing
- Anova Books – now rebranded as Pavilion Books
- Antenne Books
- Anvil Press Poetry
- Applewood Books
- Apress – technology book publisher
- Arbor House
- Arbordale Publishing
- Arcade Publishing
- Arcadia Publishing – local U.S. history
- Archipelago Books
- Arkham House
- Arktos Media
- Armida Publications
- Arsenal Pulp Press
- ArtScroll – an imprint of Mesorah Publications
- Ash-Tree Press
- Assouline Publishing
- Athabasca University Press
- Atheneum Books – a children's fiction imprint of Simon & Schuster
- Atlantic Books
- Atlas Press
- Atria Publishing Group – a division of Simon & Schuster – a UK-based imprint of Little, Brown
- Aunt Lute Books – feminist publisher (US)
- Austin Macauley Publishers
- Avery Publishing – an imprint of the Penguin Group
- Avon Publications – an imprint of HarperCollins (as of 2010)

== B ==
- Baen Books
- Baker Publishing Group
- Ballantine Books
- Banner of Truth Trust – UK-based Christian publisher
- Bantam Books – imprint owned by Random House
- Bantam Spectra – specialist sci-fi imprint of Bantam Books
- Barrie & Jenkins
- Basic Books
- BBC Books
- Beacon Press
- Belknap Press
- Bella Books
- Bellevue Literary Press
- Bendon Publishing International
- Berg Publishers – now owned by Bloomsbury Publishing
- Berkley Books – an imprint of Penguin Group (USA)
- Biblioasis
- Birlinn
- Bison Books
- Black & White Publishing
- Black Dog Publishing
- Black Ink Collective
- Black Library
- Black Sparrow Press
- Blackie and Son
- Blackstaff Press
- Blackwell Publishing
- Blake Publishing
- Bloodaxe Books
- Bloomsbury Publishing
- Blue Ribbon Books, Garden City, New York
- Bluemoose Books
- Bobbs-Merrill Company – bought out in 1959 by Howard W. Sams Company
- Bogle-L'Ouverture Publications
- Book League of America
- Book Works
- Booktrope
- Borgo Press – an imprint of Wildside Press
- Boundless
- Bowes & Bowes
- Boydell & Brewer
- Broadside Lotus Press
- Breslov Research Institute
- Brill Publishers
- Bridget Williams Books
- Brimstone Press – Australian dark-fiction publisher
- Broadview Press
- Burns & Oates – now an imprint of the Continuum International Publishing Group
- Butterworth-Heinemann – UK-based imprint of Elsevier

== C ==
- Caister Academic Press UK
- Cambridge University Press UK
- Canadian Science Publishing
- Candlewick Press
- Canongate Books
- Capstone Publishers
- Carcanet Press, Manchester
- Carlton Publishing Group UK
- Carnegie Mellon University Press
- Casemate Publishers – military history publisher
- Cassava Republic Press
- Cassell
- Cengage
- Central European University Press
- Century – an imprint of Random House
- Chambers
- Charles Scribner's Sons
- Chatto & Windus
- Chelsea Green Publishing
- Chick Publications
- Chronicle Books
- Churchill Livingstone – an imprint of Elsevier
- Cisco Press
- City Lights Publishers
- Cloverdale Corporation
- Coach House Books
- Coffee House Press
- Cold Spring Harbor Laboratory Press
- Collector's Guide Publishing
- Collins – now part of HarperCollins
- Columbia University Press
- Comma Press
- Concordia Publishing House
- Constable & Co Ltd – now part of Constable & Robinson
- Continuum International Publishing Group – also known as Continuum
- Copper Canyon Press
- Cork University Press
- Cornell University Press
- Coronet Books – a paperback imprint of Hodder & Stoughton
- Counterpoint
- Craftsman Book Company
- CRC Press
- Cresset Press
- Crocker & Brewster
- Crown Publishing Group – a subsidiary of Random House

== D ==
- D. Appleton & Company
- D. Reidel – now part of Springer Science+Business Media
- Da Capo Press – imprint of Perseus Books Group
- Dalkey Archive Press – a small fiction publisher based in Urbana, Illinois
- David & Charles
- David Bryce and Son
- DAW Books – science-fiction and fantasy imprint founded by Donald A. Wollheim
- Dedalus Books
- Deep Vellum
- Del Rey Books – a fantasy genre imprint of Random House
- Delacorte Press – an imprint of Random House
- Deseret Book Company
- The Dial Press
- Dick & Fitzgerald
- Directmedia Publishing
- Disney Publishing Worldwide
- DK
- DNA Publications
- Dobson Books
- Dodd, Mead & Co.
- Dorchester Publishing
- Doubleday – an imprint of Random House
- Douglas & McIntyre – Canadian publishing house
- Dove Medical Press
- Dover Publications
- Dreamspinner Press
- Dundurn Press – Canadian publishing house
- Dzanc Books

== E ==
- E. P. Dutton – split into two imprints; now part of Penguin Group
- Earthscan – publisher of books and journals on environmental issues and renewable energy
- ECW Press
- Eel Pie Publishing
- Egmont Press
- Elliot Stock
- Ellora's Cave
- Elsevier – now part of RELX
- Emerald Group Publishing
- Etruscan Press
- Europa Editions
- Europa Press
- Everyman's Library
- Ewha Womans University Press
- Exact Change
- Express Publishing

== F ==
- Faber and Faber
- FabJob
- Fairview Press
- Fantagraphics Books
- Farrar, Straus and Giroux – an imprint of Henry Holt and Company
- Felony & Mayhem Press
- Feminist Press
- Firebrand Books
- Fitzcarraldo Editions
- Flame Tree Publishing
- Focal Press
- Folio Society
- Formac Publishing Company
- Forum Media Group
- Four Courts Press
- Four Walls Eight Windows
- Frederick Fell Publishers, Inc.
- Frederick Warne & Co – an imprint of Penguin Group
- Free Press
- Fremantle Press
- Fulcrum Press
- Funk & Wagnalls

== G ==
- G. P. Putnam's Sons
- G-Unit Books
- Gaspereau Press
- Gay Men's Press
- Gefen Publishing House
- George H. Doran Company
- George Newnes
- Giramondo Publishing
- Godwit Press
- Golden Cockerel Press
- The Good Book Company (UK)
- Good News Publishers
- Goops Unlimited
- Goose Lane Editions
- Grafton
- Granta
- Graywolf Press
- Greenery Press
- Greenleaf Book Group
- Greenleaf Publishing Ltd
- Greenwillow Books – an imprint of HarperCollins
- Greenwood Publishing Group
- Gregg Press – a Boston, Massachusetts-based imprint of GK Hall & Company
- Grosset & Dunlap – an imprint of Penguin Group
- Grove Atlantic/Grove Press
- Guilford Press

== H ==
- Hachette Books – formerly Hyperion Books division of Disney Book Group, now a division of Perseus Books Group, a Hachette Book Group unit
- Hachette Book Group USA
- Hackett Publishing Company
- Hamish Hamilton a part of Penguin Books (UK)
- Harbor Mountain Press
- Harcourt Assessment – previously the Psychological Corporation; now part of Harcourt Education
- Harcourt – originally Harcourt Brace & Company (1919), then Harcourt, Brace & World, Inc. (1960), and Harcourt Brace Jovanovich (HBJ, 1970); now part of Harcourt Education
- Harlequin Enterprises
- Harper – became Harper & Row
- Harper & Row – now part of HarperCollins
- HarperCollins Publishers
- HarperPrism – an imprint of HarperCollins
- HarperTrophy – an imprint of HarperCollins
- Harvard University Press
- Harvest House
- Harvill Press at Random House
- Harvill Secker
- Haus Publishing
- Hawthorne Books
- Hay House
- Haymarket Books
- Haynes Manual (UK)
- Headline Publishing Group
- Heinemann – an imprint of the Harcourt Education division of RELX
- Hesperus Press
- Hemus
- Heyday Books
- HMSO
- Hodder & Stoughton
- Hogarth Press
- Holland Park Press
- Holt McDougal
- Hoover Institution Press
- Horizon Scientific Press (UK)
- Houghton Mifflin Harcourt
- House of Anansi Press
- The House of Murky Depths (UK)
- Howell-North Books – a defunct US publisher of history and Americana
- Humana Press
- Hutchinson

== I ==
- Ian Allan Publishing
- Ignatius Press
- Indiana University Press
- Influx Press
- Informa
- Information Age Publishing
- Insomniac Press Canada
- International Association of Engineers – Hong Kong
- International Universities Press
- Inter-Varsity Press – IVP UK
- InterVarsity Press – IVP USA
- Ishi Press
- Islamic Texts Society
- Island Press
- Ivyspring International Publisher

== J ==
- J.J. Little & Ives Company
- J. M. Dent
- J. Q. Preble
- Jaico Publishing House
- James Lorimer & Company
- The Jarrold Group
- The Jewish Publication Society
- John Lane
- John Murray
- Johns Hopkins University Press
- Jones & Bartlett Learning – a division of Ascend Learning

== K ==
- Karadi Tales – publishes audiobooks and picture books
- Kensington Books
- Kessinger Publishing
- Kluwer Academic Publishers
- Knockabout Comics
- Kodansha – a Japanese publisher which publishes some books in English
- Kogan Page – publishes financial books
- Koren Publishers Jerusalem – publishes Jewish religious texts and works on contemporary Jewish thought
- Korero Press – art book publisher concentrating on graphic design and illustration
- KTAV Publishing House
- Kumarian Press – publishes academic books on international development

== L ==
- Ladybird Books
- Last Gasp
- Leaf Books
- Leafwood Publishers – an imprint of Abilene Christian University Press
- Lee & Low Books
- Left Book Club
- Legend Books – a San Francisco, California-based imprint of Random House
- Legend Press
- Lethe Press
- Libertas Academica
- Liberty Fund
- Library of America
- The Lilliput Press
- Lion Hudson
- Lion Publishing – now a part of Lion Hudson
- Lionel Leventhal
- Lippincott Williams & Wilkins – an imprint of Wolters Kluwer
- Little, Brown and Company
- Liverpool University Press
- Llewellyn Worldwide
- Longman
- LPI Media
- The Lutterworth Press

== M ==
- Macmillan Publishers
- Mainstream Publishing
- Manchester University Press
- Mandrake of Oxford
- Mandrake Press
- Manning Publications
- Manor House Publishing
- Marion Boyars Publishers
- Marshall Cavendish
- Marshall Pickering – a Christian imprint of HarperCollins
- Martinus Nijhoff Publishers – an imprint of Brill Publishers
- Matthias Media
- McClelland & Stewart
- McFarland & Company
- McGraw-Hill Education
- Medknow Publications
- Melbourne University Publishing
- Melville House Publishing
- Mercier Press – Ireland's oldest independent publishing house
- Methuen Publishing
- Michael Joseph
- Michael O'Mara Books
- Michigan State University Press
- Microsoft Press – a publishing arm of Microsoft
- The Miegunyah Press
- Miles Kelly Publishing
- Milkweed Editions
- Mills & Boon
- Minerva Press
- Mirage Publishing (UK) – publishes books on mind, body and spirit, and self-help
- MIT Press
- Mkuki na Nyota
- Modern Library
- Monstrous Regiment Publishing
- Morgan James Publishing
- Mother Tongue Publishing
- Mycroft & Moran – an imprint of Arkham House
- Myriad Editions

== N ==
- Naiad Press
- Nauka
- NavPress
- New American Library
- New Beacon Books
- New Directions Publishing
- New English Library
- New Holland Publishers
- The New Press
- New Village Press
- New Win Publishing
- New York Review Books
- New York University Press
- Newnes
- No Starch Press
- Nonesuch Press
- Noontide Press
- Northwestern University Press
- Nosy Crow

== O ==
- Oberon Books
- Oneworld Publications
- Open Book Publishers
- Open Court Publishing Company
- Open University Press
- OR Books
- Orchard Books
- O'Reilly Media
- Orion Books
- Orion Publishing Group
- Osprey Publishing
- Other Press
- The Overlook Press
- Oxford University Press

== P ==
- Packt
- Palgrave Macmillan
- Pan Books – now Pan Macmillan
- Pantheon Books
- Papadakis Publisher
- Parachute Publishing
- Parragon
- Pathfinder Press
- Paulist Press
- Pavilion Books – UK publisher of illustrated books
- Pecan Grove Press
- Peirene Press
- Pen and Sword Books
- Pendleton Publishing
- Penguin Books UK
- Penguin Random House UK
- Penn State University Press
- Persephone Books
- Perseus Books Group – American publishing company
- Peter Lang
- Peter Owen Publishers
- Phaidon Press
- Philosophy Documentation Center
- Philtrum Press
- Picador
- Pimlico Books at Random House
- Playwrights Canada Press
- Pluto Press
- Point Blank – an imprint of Wildside Press
- Poisoned Pen Press
- Policy Press
- Polity
- Practical Action
- Prentice Hall
- Prime Books
- Princeton University Press
- Profile Books
- Progress Publishers
- Prometheus Books
- Puffin Books – an imprint of Penguin Books
- Purple House Press
- Pushkin Press

== Q ==
- The Quarto Group
- Que Publishing
- Quebecor
- Quirk Books

== R ==
- Random House
- Red Circle Authors
- Redstone Press
- Reed Publishing – previously A.H. & A.W. Reed
- RELX
- Remington & Co
- Repeater Books
- Restless Books
- Riverhead Books
- Robert Hale – London based independent publishing house since 1936
- Robson Books
- Rock Scorpion Books
- Rodopi
- Routledge Kegan Paul – now Routledge, an imprint of Taylor & Francis Group publishing
- Rowman & Littlefield
- Royal Society of Chemistry

== S ==
- S&P Global
- SAGE Publishing
- Salt Publishing
- Sampson Low
- Sams Publishing
- Samuel French – theater/script publishers
- Schocken Books
- Scholastic Corporation
- Scribe
- Scribner
- Seagull Books
- Serif
- Serpent's Tail
- Seven Stories Press
- Shambhala Publications
- Shire Books
- Shuter & Shooter Publishers
- Sidgwick & Jackson
- Signet Books – an imprint of New American Library
- Simon & Schuster
- Sinclair-Stevenson
- Skyhorse Publishing
- Society for Promoting Christian Knowledge
- Soho Press
- Sort of Books
- Sounds True
- Sourcebooks
- South End Press
- Spinsters Ink
- Springer Science+Business Media (formally Springer Verlag)
- Square One Publishers
- St. Martin's Press
- Stanford University Press
- The Stationery Office – publishers of UK government publications; was the printing arm of the HMSO
- Steidl
- Stein and Day – a defunct US publisher
- Summerwild Productions – a Canadian independent book publisher
- Summit Media
- SUNY Press

== T ==
- T&T Clark
- Tachyon Publications
- Talonbooks
- Tammi, Finland
- Target Books – now part of Virgin Publishing
- Tarpaulin Sky Press
- Tartarus Press
- Tate Publishing & Enterprises
- Taunton Press
- Taylor & Francis
- Ten Speed Press
- Text Publishing
- Thames & Hudson (UK)
- Thames & Hudson USA
- Thieme Medical Publishers
- Third World Press
- Thomas Nelson
- Three Sirens Press – defunct
- Ticonderoga Publications
- Time Inc.
- Tilted Axis Press
- Times Books
- Tin House
- Titan Books
- Top Shelf Productions
- Tor Books
- Tramp Press
- Troubador Press – defunct
- Tupelo Press
- Tuttle Publishing
- Twelveheads Press
- Two Dollar Radio

== U ==
- UCL Press – University College of London Press
- United States Government Publishing Office
- Universal Publishers (United States)
- University of Akron Press
- University of Alabama Press
- University of Alaska Press
- University of British Columbia Press
- University of California Press
- University of Chicago Press
- University of Georgia Press
- University of Hawaiʻi Press
- University of Illinois Press
- University of Massachusetts Press
- University of Michigan Press
- University of Minnesota Press
- University of Nebraska Press
- University of North Carolina Press
- University of Oklahoma Press
- University of Pennsylvania Press
- University of Queensland Press
- University of South Carolina Press
- University of Texas Press
- University of Toronto Press
- University of Virginia Press
- University of Wales Press
- University of Washington Press
- University of Wisconsin Press
- The University Press Limited
- University Press of America
- University Press of Kansas
- University Press of Kentucky
- Usborne Publishing

== V ==
- Valancourt Books
- Velázquez Press
- Verso Books
- Victor Gollancz Ltd
- Viking Press – merged with Penguin Group (USA)
- Vintage Books
- Virago Press
- Virgin Books
- Voyager Books – an imprint of HarperCollins

== W ==
- W. H. Allen & Co. – former British publishing house, now absorbed into Virgin Books
- W. T. Pike & Co.
- W. W. Norton & Company
- Walker Books
- Walter de Gruyter
- Ward Lock & Co
- WBusiness Books
- Weidenfeld & Nicolson
- Well-Trained Mind Press
- Wesleyan University Press
- WestBow Press – an imprint of Thomas Nelson
- Westminster John Knox Press
- Wildside Press
- Wiley
- William Edwin Rudge
- William B. Eerdmans Publishing Company
- Wipf and Stock
- Wisdom Publications
- Witherby Publishing Group
- Wolsak & Wynn Publishers
- Woodhead Publishing
- Workman Publishing Company
- World Publishing Company
- World Scientific
- Wrecking Ball Press
- Wrox Press – publishes IT manuals and technology tutorials; an imprint of Wiley
- WSOY, Finland

== X ==
- Xoanon Publishing

== Y ==
- Yale University Press

== Z ==
- Zando
- Zed Books
- Ziff Davis
- Zondervan

== See also ==
- List of English language small presses
- List of group-0 ISBN publisher codes
- List of group-1 ISBN publisher codes
- List of largest UK book publishers (publishers grouped by principal imprints)
- List of publishers of children's books
- List of self-publishing companies
- List of university presses
- List of women's presses
