= Reformers Bookshop =

- Company type: Book store
- Founded: 1983
- Headquarters: Australia
- Website: www.reformers.com.au

Reformers (Reformers Bookshop) is a non-profit Christian wholesaler and bookseller operating in Australasia, plus telephone, internet and mail order worldwide.

Originally set up in 1983 as a faith-based book ministry by a married couple of Stanmore Baptist Church to sell Banner of Truth literature, Reformers expanded its range over the years and in 2007 became a Reformed Baptist/Presbyterian joint venture in partnership with the Theological Education Committee of, and (from July 2009) the Trustees of, the Presbyterian Church of New South Wales. Its stated goal is to make available the best in historic and contemporary Christian literature, and its range reflects the theological stance of its various joint venture partners i.e. evangelical, Reformed and conservative i.e. with a high view of the Bible as the ultimate authority in all things of which it speaks. Its senior staff are theologically trained to ministerial level.

In contrast with the multi-store approach of Koorong, Reformers appears to have adopted a single-distribution-centre-cum-internet strategy for sales and order fulfilment.

Reformers is the sole Australian trade distributor for both The Good Book Company, with its well-known Christianity Explored and Discipleship Explored ranges (by Rico Tice and Barry Cooper), and P&R Publishing. Reformers is also an Australasian trade distributor or reseller for the imprints of a number of other well-known evangelical and Reformed publishing houses, including Christian Focus, Banner of Truth, Baker Book House, Good News Crossway, Day One, Eerdmans, Evangelical Press, Founders Press, Go Teach, Granted Ministries, Inter-Varsity Press UK, Ligonier Ministries, Matthias Media and Shepherd Press. Reformers trades under a number of other names throughout Australasia including Reformers Bookshop, Reformers Christian Bookshop, Great Christian Books and Advantage Plus.

Reformers supplies the books, either directly or via third-party, to a number of significant Australian conferences, including the EQUIP Women's Conferences, and Banner of Truth Conferences, a biennial conference of Reformed speakers.

Reformers also provides books for students of various Reformed theological colleges, including the Presbyterian Theological Centre Sydney, the Queensland Theological College, the Presbyterian Theological College Melbourne and the Reformed Theological College Geelong, as part of the Geneva Foundation grants. It also supports Christian missions via its sale-or-return arrangements with congregations. Reformers is a member of the Christian Bookselling Association of Australia.

== See also ==
- List of book distributors
- Reformed baptist
- The Good Book Company
- Matthias Media
