= Life Explored =

Christian evangelistic teaching course

Life Explored is an informal Christian evangelistic teaching course developed by Christianity Explored Ministries and created by Barry Cooper and Nate Morgan-Locke and is presented by those two along with Rico Tice and published by The Good Book Company. The course is considered to stand within the conservative evangelical tradition.

== Course outline and versions ==
The first edition of the course was published on November 1, 2016. The sessions are:

1. The Good God
2. The Trustworthy God
3. The Generous God
4. The Liberating God
5. The Fulfilling God
6. The Life-Giving God
7. The Joyful God

There is a follow-on course entitled "Discipleship Explored", written and presented by Barry Cooper, and "English Made Easy" editions of both Christianity Explored and Discipleship Explored. Christianity Explored publications are also available in Bulgarian, Dutch, German, Hindi, Hungarian, Italian, Luganda, Polish, Spanish, Swahili and Welsh. Translations in progress include French, Mandarin, Norwegian, Portuguese, Russian and Swedish. In 2011 the course, already being used in over 50 countries, was rolled out in the United States: it was endorsed by John Piper and Tim Keller.

== Use ==
Life Explored use is like the sister-course Christianity Explored in that both courses are aimed at a non-Christian audience who are open to exploring who is Jesus, why did he come, and what does it mean to follow him. Both LE and CE are relational with most courses run with a meal environment and both look to at the source document of Christianity - The Bible to make this exploration. Both are seven session series and both can be run in homes, in churches or in a third-place environment.

It can be run before or after Christianity Explored or Alpha, and is perfect for anyone looking for answers to life’s big questions. The course is popular with millennials as the course uses short films as a story telling medium to engage the heart and mind. It has been endorsed by a number of theologians such as DA Carson when he said, "At a time in the Western world when basic knowledge of the Bible is increasingly rare, it is a pleasure to recommend Life Explored. Here is an introduction to the good news found in Jesus Christ, sweeping through some of the "big pictures" in the Bible. As far as a short series can, Life Explored outlines what the Bible is about, exposes our idolatry, and makes clear where forgiveness and hope lie. This is one of the best of the rising number of evangelistic tools addressing men and women in the twenty-first century.” (D. A. Carson) Because in the West, particularly among the millennial generation, we can no longer take any level of biblical literacy for granted, LE gives people the context they need to be able to understand who Jesus is and why he came. A panoramic view of the Bible is given - creation, fall, redemption and new creation - rather than just a narrow slice of the picture.

== Comparison with the Christianity Explored course ==
Similarities: Both courses are evangelistic, expository (letting the Bible tell the Gospel), and engaging (in a relational, dialogue intentional setting. While Christianity Explored uses the Gospel of Mark, Life Explored (also a 7 week course) looks at the Bible as the whole while looking at the character of God to ask the question, "What is the best gift God could give you?" The course follows a general outline of creation, fall, redemption and new-creation.

Distinctive features of Life Explored: Because it’s more readily acknowledged among postmoderns than the concept of law-breaking, LE explains sin as idolatry, while CE explains sin as law-breaking. Life Explored uses two films - one story film and one teaching film - in each session to engage the participant. The story film - for the most part filmed without dialogue - helps the viewer see how one has replaced the gift of God himself with a cheaper, and inadequate substitute. The second film is a teaching film (like the CE films) reveals the God of the Bible as the answer to our deepest longing.

In early 2017 the blog The Happy Certainty did a review of Life Explored and looked at its uses,

== See also ==
- Christianity Explored Ministries
- The Good Book Company
