= Derek Thomas (theologian) =

American pastor and theologian

The Reverend Derek Thomas
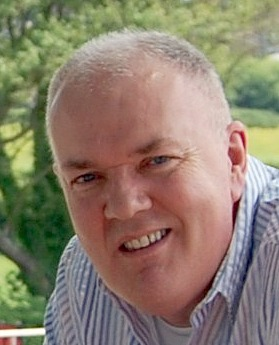
- Born: Derek W. H. Thomas; February 7, 1953 (age 73); Wales, United Kingdom
- Occupations: Professor of Theology and Pastor
- Spouse: Rosemary Iris Thomas (m. 1976)
- Children: Ellen Lockington (Thomas), Owen Thomas

Derek W. H. Thomas is a Welsh Reformed theologian and pastor. Known for his teaching, writing, and editorial work, he retired in December 2023 as the senior pastor of First Presbyterian Church of Columbia, South Carolina. He is currently serving as stated supply at Christ Church PCA in Katy, TX. He continues as distinguished visiting professor of systematic and historical theology at Reformed Theological Seminary in Atlanta, Georgia.

Thomas is originally from Wales. In 1978, he completed his ministerial training from Reformed Theological Seminary in the US before moving on to receive his PhD from the University of Wales, Lampeter, with a thesis on Calvin's preaching on the Book of Job. He was ordained into the Evangelical Presbyterian Church of Ireland, and served as a pastor of Stranmillis Evangelical Presbyterian Church in Belfast, Northern Ireland for 17 years, before returning to the United States in 1996 to serve as the minister of teaching at First Presbyterian Church in Jackson, Mississippi. In 2011, he became associate pastor at First Presbyterian Church in Columbia, South Carolina, and was appointed senior pastor on August 11, 2013. He has written and edited more than 27 books. He has also produced a volume for the Biblical commentary series published by Banner of Truth Trust and Evangelical Press. In 2004, Derek Thomas became editorial director for The Alliance of Confessing Evangelicals and the editor of its e-zine, Reformation 21.

== Personal life ==
Thomas is originally from Wales, being born in Llanybydder in 1953. He was one of four children - with siblings David, Anne and Denis - to David John and Mary Rose Thomas. He has been married to Rosemary Iris Thomas since 1976. She is from the Limestone Road area of North Belfast. Together they have two children: Ellen and Owen, and two grandchildren: Hannah and Daniel.

He was raised as a nominal Christian, but not attending church. He came to faith in Christ while reading John Stott's book 'Basic Christianity'. He can pinpoint his conversion to 11:30pm on December 28, 1971 while back home with his parents.

== Plagiarism ==
In 2018 P&R Publishing withdrew Derek Thomas' commentary on the Book of Acts after allegations of uncredited use of pastor Sinclair Ferguson's sermons on Acts. They noted that "the lack of attribution resulted from unclear note-taking more than a decade before the commentary on Acts was written, and we believe it does not reflect intentional misuse on the part of the author."

The church leadership at Thomas' church backed Thomas in a statement of support. Reformed Theological Seminary, which Thomas works for as a professor, also defended him, saying, "an RTS committee reviewing the Acts incident had cleared Thomas of 'any knowing and intentional plagiarism.' He [Ligon Duncan] added that Thomas will continue to teach. 'From the standpoint of RTS,' Duncan wrote, 'the case is now closed.'"

A commission of the Associate Reformed Presbyterian Catawba Presbytery found that Derek Thomas had in fact copied from the sermons of Sinclair Ferguson without proper attribution, but that "none of the interviews and investigations of this Committee have revealed any credible evidence that Derek Thomas intentionally engaged in the practice of plagiarism." Accordingly, Thomas was admonished in writing by the Catawba Presbytery for "unintentional plagiarism".

== Selected works ==
- "Heaven On Earth: What the Bible Teaches about the Life to Come", Christian Focus Publications, 2018.
- Strength For The Weary, Reformation Trust Publishing, 2018.
- The Pilgrim’s Progress: A Guided Tour, Ligonier Ministries, 2014.
- How the Gospel Brings Us All the Way Home, Reformation Trust Publishing, 2011.
- Acts: Reformed Expository Commentary, P&R, 2011 (withdrawn by the publisher in November 2018 due to "unattributed content from sermons by another pastor").
- What Is Providence?, Basics of the Faith series, P&R, 2008.
- Let’s Study Galatians, Banner of Truth, 2004.
- Calvin’s Teaching on Job: Proclaiming the Incomprehensible God, Christian Focus Publications, 2004.
- Give Praise to God: A Vision for Reforming Worship (Ed. with J. Ligon Duncan III and Philip Graham Ryken), P&R, 2003.
- Let’s Study Revelation, Edinburgh: Banner of Truth, 2003.
- Mining for Wisdom: 28 Daily Readings from Job, Evangelical Press, 2002.
- Making the Most of your Devotional Life, Evangelical Press, 2001.
- Praying the Saviour’s Way, Christian Focus Publications, 2001.
- The Essential Commentaries for a Preacher’s Library, Reformed Academic Press, 1996.
- Taken Up To Heaven: The Ascension of Christ, foreword by J. Ligon Duncan, Evangelical Press, 1996.
- The Storm Breaks: Job Simply Explained, Welwyn Commentary Series, Evangelical Press, 1995. Second Impression 2004.
- God Strengthens: Ezekiel Simply Explained, Welwyn Commentary Series, Evangelical Press, 1993. Second Impression 2003.
- God Delivers: Isaiah Simply Explained, Welwyn Commentary Series, Evangelical Press, 1991. Second Impression 1998.
- Help for Hurting Christians: Reflections on Psalms, Evangelical Press, 1991.
- Wisdom: The Key to Living God’s Way, Christian Focus Publications, 1990.
- Serving the King: A Guide to Christian Usefulness, Evangelical Press, 1989.
