= Kerry Daynes =

English psychologist

- Occupations: Television presenter; author; model
- Years active: 2000–present
- Known for: Forensic psychology
- Television: Faking It: Tears of a Crime

Kerry Daynes is an English forensic psychologist, author, TV presenter, and podcaster. She is best known for her work in profiling criminals in true crime television shows, including Discovery Channel's Faking It: Tears of a Crime.

== Early life ==
Daynes grew up in Stockport, Greater Manchester.

== Career ==
Daynes began a career in psychology after volunteering at a men's prison, aged 21, and later trained to become a criminal psychologist, studying psychology with law at the University of Sheffield. Her roles include being an expert witness in court and parole boards. She has worked on cases of some of the UK's most notorious criminals including Ian Brady and Peter Sutcliffe.

In 2023, Daynes advised against the release of infamous criminal Charles Bronson, and stated that he had 'mild PTSD'.

== Personal life ==
In 2011, Daynes was subject to a stalker who offered her the chance to buy domains in her name. In the same year, she found her cat killed and 'Jill Dando' scrawled on her fence. The stalker was later given a harassment warning by the police.

She is a patron of the National Centre for Domestic Violence and Talking2Minds.

== Filmography ==
=== Television ===
Year	Title	Role	Notes
2017	Faking It: Tears of a Crime	Presenter, Forensic Psychologist	
2019	Secrets of a Pyschopath	Presenter	
2022	Jack the Ripper - 5 Victims	Presenter	
2025	Murder in Mind	Presenter	

=== Podcast ===
Year	Title	Role	Notes
2026	The Profiler with Kerry Daynes	Presenter	

== Bibliography ==
- The Devil You Know (May 2011) ISBN 1444714279
- The Dark Side of the Mind (May 2019) ISBN 1788401336
- What Lies Buried (August 2021) ISBN 978-1913068592
