= Maurice Horn =

American art historian (1931–2022)

- Born: June 28, 1931; France
- Died: December 30, 2022 (aged 91)
- Occupations: Historian, critic, editor
- Known for: Academic study of comic books
- Notable work: The World Encyclopedia of Comics; The World Encyclopedia of Cartoons; 100 Years of American Newspaper Comics

Maurice Horn (June 28, 1931 – December 30, 2022) was a French-American comics historian, author, and editor, considered to be one of the first serious academics to study comics. He was the editor of The World Encyclopedia of Comics, The World Encyclopedia of Cartoons, and 100 Years of American Newspaper Comics. Born in France, he was based in New York City. Horn died on December 30, 2022, at the age of 91.

== Career ==
Horn grew up in France particularly fascinated by American comics. His interest in Amercian comics grew as a result of the French reprints of Disney comic books brought to Europe by the American Military.

In the late 1950s, collaborating with countryman Claude Moliterni (later the editorial director of the French publisher Dargaud) under the joint pen names Karl von Kraft and Franck Sauvage (after Doc Savage), Horn co-wrote a number of French-language pulp mystery and spy novels.

From 1956 to 1960, Horn and Moliterni (as Franck Sauvage) wrote the radio mystery show Allô... Police! for Radio Luxemburg.

Looking for more lucrative writing work, Horn emigrated to the United States in 1959. Returning frequently to France, he was a member of the 1960s groups Club Bande Dessinée and SOCERLID ("Société civile d’études et de recherché des littératures dessinées"), which championed the idea of comics as "the ninth art" and worthy of academic study. Horn was instrumental in organizing three important exhibitions of comics art in the late 1960s and early 1970s:

- Bande dessinée et figuration narrative. 7 April–12 June 1967, Musée des Arts Décoratifs, Paris
- AAARGH!: a Celebration of Comics. 31 December 1970 – 7 February 1971, Institute of Contemporary Arts, London
- 75 Years of the Comics. 8 September–7 November 1971, New York Cultural Center, New York

Horn's two-volume The World Encyclopedia of Comics, first published in 1976, focused on American and European comics (although not exclusively), with extensive biographical notes and publication histories. It was one of the first and most comprehensive resources of its kind, and spawned seven volumes. A complete edition was published in 1997 (and updated again in 1999), and included the work of fifteen contributors. Both editions have been criticised as containing numerous historical innaccuracies.

His Comics of the American West (1977) traced the history of Western comics, dissecting how they contributed to the mythology of the American West.

The World Encyclopedia of Cartoons (first published in 1979) profiles the lives and work of more than 1,500 cartoonists and animators from the United States, Europe, Russia, Japan, and South America. Horn was lead editor, Rick Marschall was assistant editor, and there were more than twenty other contributors. A second volume was published in 1980; the fifth volume was published in 1983.

Horn's publications in the 1980s included his book Sex in the Comics (1985), which dealt with such topics as sex and violence, and the sex lives of superheroes. His dictionary-style reference book Contemporary Graphic Artists (1986) included designers as well as illustrators, animators, and cartoonists, and highlighted each entrant's most famous works.

Horn's 1996 tome 100 Years of American Newspaper Comics is a history of American comic strips. At more than 400 pages, it is an encyclopedia-style rundown of every significant American comic strip from the late 1890s to the current day.

Horne was given the Special John Buscema Haxtur Award at the 2007 Salón Internacional del Cómic del Principado de Asturias (International Comics Convention of the Principality of Asturias).

== In popular culture ==
Milton Caniff styled the Steve Canyon character M’sieu Toute (appearing in July through September 1968) after Horn.

== Books ==
=== Nonfiction ===
- (with Pierre C. Couperie) A History of the Comic Strip (Crown Publishers, 1968) — translated from the French by Eileen Hennessy
- (editor) The Golden Age of the Comics No. 7, Mandrake in Hollywood (Nostalgia Press, 1970)
- 75 Years of the Comics (Boston Book of Art, 1971) ISBN 978-0843510102 — catalogue of the exhibition curated by Horn
- (editor) The World Encyclopedia of Comics (Chelsea House, 1976) ISBN 978-0877540304
  - (Italian edition) Enciclopedia Mondiale del Fumetto (Editoriale Corno, 1978) – translated by Luciano Secchi
- Comics of the American West (New Win Publishing, 1977) ISBN 9780876911907
- Women in the Comics (3 volumes, Chelsea House, Philadelphia, Pa., USA, 1st edition 1977, 2011) ISBN 0-7910-5911-1 ISBN 0-7910-5912-XISBN 0-7910-5913-8.
- (editor) Burne Hogarth's The Golden Age of Tarzan: 1939-1942 (Chelsea House, 1977)
- (editor) The World Encyclopedia of Cartoons (Chelsea House, 1979) ISBN 978-0877541219 — 6 volumes
- Sex in the Comics (Chelsea House, 1985) ISBN 978-0877548508
- Contemporary Graphic Artists: A Biographical, Bibliographical, and Critical Guide to Current Illustrators, Animators, Cartoonists, Designers, and Other Graphic Artists (Gale Research / Cengage Learning, 1986) ISBN 978-0810321892
- (editor) 100 Years of American Newspaper Comics: An Illustrated Encyclopedia (Gramercy Books, 1996) ISBN 978-0517124475

=== Fiction ===
With Claude Moliterni as Karl von Kraft:

- Espions en Blouses Blanches ("Spies in White Coats") (Arabesque, 1956)
- Rafales su l’Asia ("Gusts on Asia") (Arabesque, 1957)
- Jusqu’au dernier sursaut ("Until the Last Gasp") (Arabesque, 1957)

With Claude Moliterni as Franck Sauvage:

- Corps à Corps en Corée ("Close Combat in Korea") (1958)
- La mort au grand gallop ("Death at a Gallop") (1957)
- Le Jeu du Scorpion ("The Scorpion Game") (1957)
- Envoyés du Silence ("Silent Emissaries") (1957)
- Cap sur le cap ("Cape on Cape Town") (1958)
- A Vous Couper le Souffle ("Breathtaking") (Librairie de la Cité, 1958)

== Writings ==
- "Comics and Cinema: The Beginnings (1896–1913)". International Journal of Comic Art. 9 (2): 60 (15 October 2007).

== See also ==
- Allan Holtz
- Bill Blackbeard
- Woody Gelman
- Ron Goulart
- Don Markstein
- Rick Marschall
- Trina Robbins
- Dave Strickler
