= Gordon Cheng =

Australian Anglican cleric and writer (1961–2026)

Gordon Cheng (1961 – 20 October 2026) was an Australian Christian writer and Evangelical Anglican cleric. He served as a Bible teacher for the Australian Fellowship of Evangelical Students based at the Sydney Conservatorium of Music. Prior to this he was campus director (Australian Fellowship of Evangelical Students) with the Cumberland Campus of Sydney University. For several years he was the resources editor of Matthias Media (a non-denominational Christian publisher based in Sydney). He was also an Anglican presbyter (priest) in the Diocese of Sydney.

== Life and career ==
Cheng was of Swedish and Chinese descent. He was ordained in the Anglican Diocese of Melbourne.

Cheng worked for 10 years as a senior staff worker with the Australian Fellowship of Evangelical Students at the University of Melbourne and then ministered at a number of churches in Sydney. He was employed by Matthias Media from February 2004 to January 2009 to work on resources other than its flagship magazine, The Briefing.

He was an active member of the Anglican Diocese of Sydney. He ministered at St Paul's Church, Carlingford. From 2004 to 2006 he was involved in the Cumberland University Church, ministering to the Cumberland Campus of Sydney University.

== Writings ==
Cheng was the author of several books and other resources published by Matthias Media, including the Pathway Bible Guides Bible study series. His first book and multimedia publication with Matthias Media was the Six Steps to Encouragement course. He was an associate of the Anglican Dean of Sydney, Phillip Jensen, and edited several of his books.

Starting in the mid-1990s, Cheng wrote numerous articles for The Briefing, a popular evangelical journal distributed in Australia, England and the United States. He was a critic of the ordination of women to the priesthood and homosexuality and wrote on the priority of Christian ministry over secular work.

He sent numerous letters to online and print media, some of which were published in the Sydney Morning Herald and other newspapers, and posted regularly on many websites and forums, including the Sydney diocese's "Sydney Anglicans" website where several of his articles have been published. He also posted on the Ship of Fools website. His posts defended the actions of a church which was the subject of a defamation lawsuit involving the sacking of a female lay worker. More recently, Cheng had been a guest opinion writer for Sydney's Daily Telegraph and Sunday Telegraph newspapers, writing opinion pieces on religious and ethical issues, including Lent, euthanasia, and racism, In late 2006 he was also enlisted by Daily Telegraph columnist Piers Akerman to be a guest writer for a Muslim-Christian debate run by the paper on multiculturalism; others participating included Lebanese Muslim representative Keysar Trad.

== Personal life and death ==
Cheng was married and had three children. He died on 20 October 2026.
