= Charles Bronson (prisoner) =

English criminal (born 1952)

- Bronson, 1990s
- Born: Michael Gordon Peterson; 6 December 1952 (age 73); Luton, Bedfordshire, England
- Other names: Charles Ali Ahmed; Mickey; Charles Salvador
- Spouses: Irene Kelsey (m. 1971; div. 1976) Saira Ali Ahmed (m. 2001; div. 2005) Paula Williamson (m. 2017; died 2019)
- Children: 1
- Status: Incarcerated
- Convictions: Armed robbery; wounding (3); wounding with intent; criminal damage; grievous bodily harm; false imprisonment (3); blackmail; death threats
- Penalty: Life imprisonment

Charles Arthur Salvador (born Michael Gordon Peterson; 6 December 1952; formerly known as Charles Ali Ahmed), better known by his professional name of Charles Bronson, is an English criminal notorious for his violent life both between and during multiple prison sentences. He has spent periods detained in the Rampton, Broadmoor, and Ashworth high-security psychiatric hospitals.

First arrested as a petty criminal, he was convicted and sentenced in 1974 to seven years' imprisonment for armed robbery. Further sentences were imposed because of attacks on prisoners and prison officers. Upon his release in 1987, he began a bare-knuckle boxing career in the East End of London. His promoter thought he needed a more suitable name and suggested he change it to Charles Bronson, after the American actor. He was returned to prison in 1988 on conviction concerning another robbery. He was a violent prisoner, and had taken numerous hostages in the course of confrontations with prison officers, resulting in sentences of life imprisonment. He has been held at times in each of England's three special psychiatric hospitals.

Bronson has been featured in books, interviews, and studies of prison reform and treatment. He has said: "I'm a nice guy, but sometimes I lose all my senses and become nasty. That doesn't make me evil, just confused." He was the subject of the 2008 film Bronson, a biopic based loosely on his life, starring Tom Hardy as Bronson, with Kairon Scott Busuttil and William Darke playing him as a child.

Bronson has written many books about his experiences and the famous prisoners he has met throughout his incarceration. Spending many years in segregation from other prisoners, Bronson became both a fitness fanatic and an artist, writing a book about exercising in confined spaces, and having his paintings and illustrations of prison and psychiatric hospital life exhibited, winning awards.

In 2014, he changed his name again, this time to Charles Salvador, in a mark of respect to Salvador Dalí, one of his favourite artists. The Charles Salvador Art Foundation was founded to promote his artwork and "help those in positions even less fortunate than his own" to participate in art. In 2026, he was denied parole for the ninth time.

== Life ==
=== Early life ===
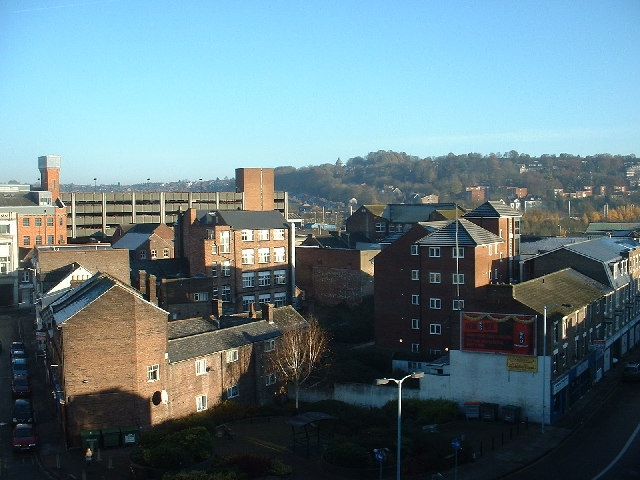
Luton, Bedfordshire, which Bronson considers his home town

Born Michael Gordon Peterson in Luton, Bedfordshire, he was one of three sons of Eira (née Parry) and John G. Peterson. His father later ran the Conservative club in Aberystwyth. His uncle and aunt each served as mayor of Luton in the 1960s and 1970s.

His aunt, Eileen Parry, is quoted as saying: "As a boy, he was a lovely lad. He was obviously bright and always good with children. He was gentle and mild-mannered, never a bully; he would defend the weak".

Peterson lived in Luton from the age of four. When he was a teenager, his family moved to Ellesmere Port, Cheshire, where he started getting into trouble. At the age of 13, he was part of a gang of four robbers and was reprimanded in juvenile court after he was caught stealing. He enjoyed fighting from an early age, and was often absent from school. Peterson later returned to Luton, which he refers to as his home town. His first job was at Tesco, which lasted a fortnight before he was dismissed for attacking his manager. He passed through a number of jobs, working as a hod carrier and in a number of factories. He was imprisoned for the first time at Risley, serving time on remand for criminal damage after he smashed some parked cars following an argument with his girlfriend's father. Following his trial, he was fined and given probation.

Peterson worked as a furniture remover, while regularly fighting on his nights out. After being involved in petty crime, he was in serious trouble with the authorities for the first time after crashing a stolen lorry into a car. He was apprehended in his parents' home, 90 miles (140 km) from the scene of the incident. The driver of the car survived the collision, resulting in Bronson not facing serious penalty, receiving fines and probation. After his trial, he returned to petty crime and menial labour. Aged 19, Bronson was convicted for his part in a smash and grab raid. The judge gave him a suspended sentence.

He met Irene Kelsey in 1971, who described him as "so different from any other boys I knew. He always wore tailored suits, had perfectly-groomed sideburns and a Cockney accent." Eight months later in 1972, when Kelsey was four months pregnant, the couple married at Chester Register Office. Their son is Michael Jonathan Peterson. Five years later they divorced, and Kelsey later remarried.

=== 1974–1987 ===
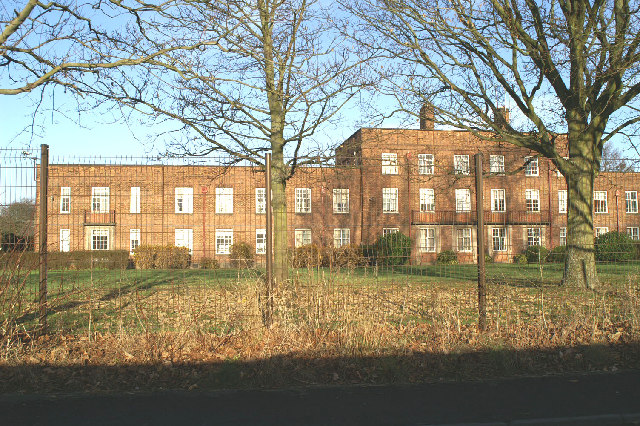
Ashworth Hospital, where Bronson spent some time as a mental health patient

Bronson was convicted of armed robbery in 1974, aged twenty two, and sentenced to seven years imprisonment. He was sent to Walton Gaol, and soon ended up in the punishment block after attacking two prisoners without being provoked. He was transferred to Hull in 1975. After refusing prison work, he smashed up a workshop after an altercation with a prison officer, and was sent to the punishment block. He was injected with the sedative chlorpromazine, which made him violently ill, and six months were added to his sentence.

After recovering, he continued to prove a highly challenging inmate, and was repeatedly placed in solitary confinement for several months. He attacked fellow prisoner John Henry Gallagher with a glass jug, and was charged with grievous bodily harm. The charges were later dropped to unlawful wounding, and he was convicted. Nine months were added to his sentence. He was transferred to Armley Gaol.

Peterson found that his reputation as a violent and highly dangerous inmate preceded him. During 1975 to 1977, he was switched between Armley, Wakefield, Parkhurst, and Walton prisons. He was taken from Yorkshire to London chained to the floor of a prison van. Kept in solitary confinement, he began a fitness programme. He continued to attack other convicts and damage prison property. While recovering in solitary from a beating given to him for punching two prison officers, Bronson was handed the divorce papers filed by his wife.

At Wandsworth, he attempted to poison the prisoner in the cell next to him. He was moved to Parkhurst Prison in 1976, where he befriended the Kray twins, whom he described as "the best two guys I've ever met". He was moved back to Wandsworth after threatening to kill a prison officer. He spent four months in isolation after he was caught trying to dig his way out of his cell. After being returned to the prison's general population, he caught up with the prisoner who had informed on his escape plan, and attacked him, scarring him for life.

The governor at Wandsworth wanted to transfer Bronson out of his facility, and only the C Unit Psychiatric Wing at Parkhurst was willing to accept him. Bronson was returned to the Isle of Wight. There he attacked a prisoner with a jam jar, and was again charged with grievous bodily harm. He attempted suicide and attacked another prison officer, and was made subject to a transfer direction order under the Mental Health Act.

In December 1978, Bronson arrived at Broadmoor, but was soon transferred to Rampton Secure Hospital. Unable to adapt to forced medication, and in the company of highly disturbed and highly dangerous patients, Bronson attempted to strangle child rapist and murderer John White. He was apprehended just as White was giving out his death rattle. Bronson was returned to Broadmoor, where he reunited with Ronnie Kray.

"I witnessed them running into walls, using their heads as rams. I've seen them fall unconscious doing this. They stabbed themselves with pens, needles, scissors. One even blinded himself in one eye and another tore out his own testicle. There was one just kept trying to eat himself, biting his arms, legs and feet."

— Bronson on finding it impossible to relate to other patients in the mental institutions where he was held.

At Broadmoor, Bronson attempted to strangle Gordon Robinson to death, but was prevented from doing so by the tearing of the silk tie he was using. Following this failure, Bronson became depressed, but found his spirits lifted when Ronnie Kray arranged a visit from boxer Terry Downes. In 1982, he performed his first rooftop protest after escaping to the top of Broadmoor, tearing off roof tiles. Not long after the first incident, he again reached the roof of Broadmoor. He caused £250,000 worth of damage in a three-day protest, before he was talked down by his family.

Following further treatment, he took up art. Eventually, he received more prison awards than any other inmate for his poems, prose, and cartoons. He made a third rooftop protest, this time demanding a prison transfer, and was again talked down. He began an 18-day-long hunger strike, and was eventually granted a transfer to Ashworth Hospital, then known as Park Lane Hospital, in June 1984.

"I'd been certified mad because of my violence. I was still violent – and they were now certifying me sane. Where's the sanity in that? Isn't the system just as crazy?"

— Psychiatrists discussed psychopathy and schizophrenia, but never agreed on what mental illnesses, if any, Bronson had.

Though Bronson was more settled in the more modern facilities and regime at Ashworth, he soon returned to his previous behaviour. He used a sauce bottle to stab Mervin Horley, a patient who made sexual advances towards him. He was returned to the general prison population at Risley Remand Centre in 1985, and was placed in isolation after punching a fellow inmate. In May 1985, Bronson pleaded guilty to grievous bodily harm for the attack on Horley, and three years were added to his sentence. Later in the year, he was returned to Walton, where he made another three-day rooftop protest, causing £100,000 worth of damage. Authorities added another year to his sentence. He was moved to Albany, where he punched another convict on his first day in general prison population. He was quickly moved to Wormwood Scrubs. Two weeks later he was returned to Wandsworth.

In 1986, Bronson was transferred eight times, the only new location being Winchester. He strangled the governor of Wormwood Scrubs during one particularly violent episode. On 3 January 1987, he was transferred to Gartree, where he served the rest of his sentence in isolation, other than ten days spent in nearby Leicester Prison.

=== 1987–1999 ===
Upon his release from Gartree, Peterson was met by his family and stayed with his parents for a few days in Aberystwyth. He took a train to London, bought a water pistol, modified it, and used it to intimidate a stranger into driving him to Luton. Bronson embarked on a short-lived career in illegal bare-knuckle boxing in the East End of London on the advice of long-time friend Reggie Kray. He changed his name from Michael Peterson to Charles Bronson in 1987 on the advice of his fight promoter, Paul Edmonds, although he had never seen a film starring the American actor Charles Bronson. He offered to fight Lenny McLean, but was refused. He said that he killed a rottweiler with his bare hands in a £10,000 underground fight. Later, he said that this was "not something I'm proud of because I love animals."

On New Year's Day 1988, to the surprise of his girlfriend Alison, he robbed a jewellery shop, kept a ring for her, and sold the rest. On 7 January 1988, his 69th day of freedom, he was apprehended and arrested on his morning jog. The arresting officers charged him under his fighting name, Charles Bronson, and he decided at that moment to give up the name Michael Peterson. He was returned to Leicester Prison, as Bedford Prison refused to house him on account of his uncontrollable behaviour during his first term of imprisonment.

His defence had looked strong, as eyewitnesses refused to testify due to fear of reprisals. Alison retracted her initial testimony and became the prosecution's main witness. This removed Bronson's alibi, and gave the prosecution all the evidence needed to win the case. Bronson made a failed bid to reach the prison's roof, and was transferred to Brixton. At Brixton, Bronson was placed in a top-secure unit of 16 prisoners. In June 1988, he pleaded guilty to armed robbery and was sentenced to seven years.

Bronson was taken to Wandsworth, before being transferred to Full Sutton. There he spent time in isolation for punching a prisoner and a prison officer, and throwing water on the governor. He spent a month at Durham, where he bonded with a family of rodents that crept into his cell. In 1989, he was moved to Long Lartin, and seemed to settle at the prison. He eventually "went over the edge" and ran riot in the nude, clutching a spear he fashioned out of a broken bottle and a broom handle. After another incident in which Bronson ran amok, he was placed in isolation.

He spent two months at Bristol, before being moved to Birmingham, Winchester, and back to Wandsworth in September 1989. He was regularly moved and frequently in trouble, particularly so when he punched two prison officers at Gartree and took the Deputy Governor hostage at Frankland. At Parkhurst, he was on the receiving end of an attack, when at least two prisoners stabbed him in the back several times. Bronson refused to speak to the police about it. He recovered from the attack without further incidents, and was released from prison in November 1992.

Bronson spent 53 days as a free man before being arrested, this time for conspiracy to rob. He was remanded at the newly opened Woodhill Prison. He insisted that his girlfriend Kelly-Anne, her friend Carol, and her lover were lying to the police in order to get him locked away. On 9 February 1993, the charges of robbery were dismissed. He was given a £600 fine for breaking the nose of Kelly-Anne's lover. Sixteen days later, he was arrested for conspiracy to rob and for possession of a sawn-off shotgun. On remand in Woodhill, he took a civilian librarian hostage, and demanded an inflatable doll, a helicopter, and a cup of tea from police negotiators. He released the hostage after being disgusted when the man farted in front of him.

Bronson was taken from Belmarsh to Bullingdon Prison for his trial. He pleaded guilty to possessing the shotgun, but not guilty for the conspiracy charges. He told the jury he had intended to use the shotgun to blow his head off. On 14 September 1993, he was found guilty of 'intent to rob' and not guilty of conspiracy to rob. His co-defendant was found not guilty of all charges. Bronson was given an eight-year sentence.

Bronson was taken from Belmarsh to Wakefield, where he spent 40 days naked in isolation. He was transferred to Hull in November, where he spent a number of months without incident. He took deputy governor Adrian Wallace hostage on Easter Monday 1994. He was overpowered by guards, and was transferred to Leicester. He was returned to Wakefield, where he was confined to what was known as the "Hannibal Cage", previously occupied by Robert Maudsley. While there, prison officers Mick O'Hagan and Alan Jarvis encouraged Bronson to take up art, and he began to concentrate on cartooning.

His father died in September 1994, during a period when Bronson was in constant solitary confinement and was moved almost weekly. He attacked the governor at High Down, who had felt safe enough to visit Bronson on his own, telling his prison officers that "he's okay with me". At Lincoln, he was allowed to spend time with children with Down syndrome. He was taken out of solitary and placed back on the prison wings after getting along well with the children. He was returned to isolation after returning from 30-minutes' exercise, 30 minutes late.

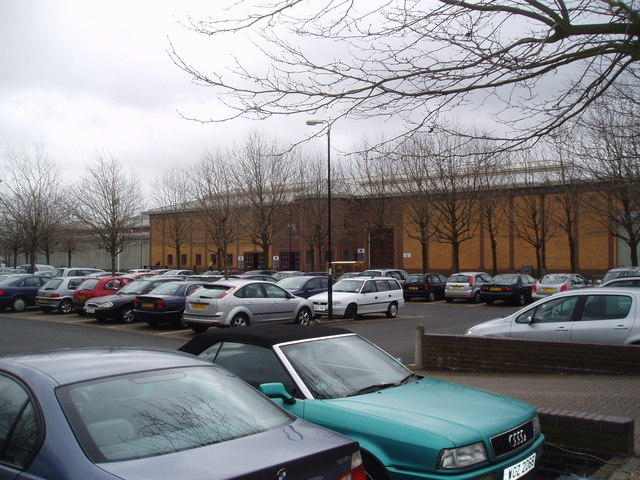
Belmarsh Prison, where Bronson took two Iraqi hijackers hostage

In April 1996, he was sent back to Belmarsh after taking a doctor hostage at Birmingham. Five months later, an Iraqi hijacker bumped into him in the canteen and did not apologise. After a long period of brooding, Bronson took two other Iraqi hijackers, along with another inmate named Jason Greasley, hostage in a cell. By his own admission, he was "losing it badly" and ranted about his dead father, saying that any "funny business" would result in him "snapping necks". He sang and laughed and forced the Iraqis to tickle his feet and call him 'General'.

He demanded a plane to take him to Libya, two Uzi sub-machine guns, 5,000 rounds of ammunition, and an axe. He released Greasley, but began chanting "I want ice cream". He felt guilty after hitting one of the hostages with a metal tray and therefore insisted the same hostage hit him over the head four times so as to call it 'quits'. He slashed himself four times with a safety razor, but agreed to release the hostages and walk back to the segregation unit. Another seven years were added to his sentence. This was reduced to five years on appeal.

"My eyes are bad due to the years of unnatural light I have had. My vision is terrible; I have to wear shaded glasses even to read. Years of solitary have left me unable to face the light for more than a few minutes. It gives me terrible headaches if I do ... Years of loneliness in small cells have left me paranoid about people invading my space. I now can't stand people getting too close, crowding me. I hate people breathing on me and I hate smelly bodies coming near me. Mouths to me are simply for eating – never for kissing ... A man needs a routine to cope with such an extreme situation. For me it is my push-ups and sit-ups. I also pace the room and count each step. Some I know lie down on their beds for three hours on their left side, three hours on their right, and three on their back."

— Humans are social animals, and though he remained in top physical shape, years of solitary created health and psychological problems that made interaction difficult for Bronson.

In October 1996, Bronson was unsettled as he had an unexpected visit from Robert Taylor, a doctor, instead of his regular lawyer. He took Taylor hostage, but released him 30 minutes later after coming to his senses. Taylor refused to assist a prosecution.

In January 1999, he took Phil Danielson, a civilian education worker, hostage, as he had criticised one of Bronson's drawings. Bronson tore up the prison, throwing refrigeration units and furniture around. He was shocked and knocked unconscious for a few minutes when wrenching a washing machine out of the wall. The siege lasted for 44 hours before he released Danielson. Bronson was transferred to Whitemoor.

For the incident, Bronson received a discretionary life sentence to run a minimum of three years. Later, in 1999, a special prison unit was set up at Woodhill for Bronson, Robert Maudsley, and Reginald Wilson, to reduce the risk they posed to staff and other prisoners. Danielson received £65,000 in compensation from the Home Office in an out-of-court settlement, although the prison service did not admit liability for its negligence in failing to protect a civilian employee.

=== 2001–present ===
In 2001, Bronson married again, this time in HMP Woodhill to Fatema Saira Rehman, a Bangladeshi-born divorcee. She had seen his picture and an article about him in a newspaper and began writing to him. Rehman had visited Bronson ten times before they married. She had worked at a women's shelter before they met, but lost her job when her employer found out about the relationship.

For a short time, Bronson converted to his wife's faith of Islam, and wished to be known as Charles Ali Ahmed, but did not change his name legally. After four years, he and Rehman divorced, and he renounced Islam. During this period, Bronson appealed against his life sentence. Three appeal court judges rejected the application in April 2004. In court, with six prison guards surrounding him, Bronson said his wife and her daughter were helping to rehabilitate him, and references about his character, including reports from psychiatrists, were positive on this occasion.

In 2007, two prison staff members at Full Sutton high security dispersal prison in the East Riding of Yorkshire were involved in a "control and restraint incident", in an attempt to prevent another hostage situation, during which Bronson had his tinted glasses broken. Bronson received £200 compensation for his broken glasses.

Bronson remained a Category A prisoner when he was moved to Wakefield High-Security Prison. He was due for a parole hearing in September 2008. This was postponed when his lawyer objected to a one-hour parole interview, requesting a full day to deal with Bronson's case. The parole hearing took place on 11 March 2009, with the board refusing parole shortly afterwards.

In August 2013, a petition with 10,000 signatures was presented to 10 Downing Street calling for his release. In an enclosed note, Bronson appealed to prime minister David Cameron for him to be able to "live what's left of my life and not be buried in the prison system".

On 28 February 2014, Bronson violently attacked the prison governor in a television room in HMP Woodhill, over a dispute that his mail was being withheld, including two letters from his mother. The governor had serious bruising. In July 2014, Bronson was sentenced to two years. The prison accepted that his mail may have been unacceptably processed.

In August 2014, Bronson announced that he was changing his name via deed poll to Charles Salvador, in tribute to the artist Salvador Dalí. In a hand-written statement on his website, Salvador stated that "The old me dried up... Bronson came alive in 1987. He died in 2014."

Under this new name, he began creating works of art described as "fantasy reality". A collection of these works was auctioned in October 2014.

Salvador proposed to actress Paula Williamson, during a prison visit on 13 February 2017, and was accepted. She had been visiting him for five months. According to Williamson: "Charlie is a changed man. It is my hope that he will be released by my 40th birthday, in August 2020". Williamson, who had minor roles in Coronation Street and Emmerdale, married Salvador in the prison chapel on 14 November 2017.

In July 2018, it became known that Bronson asked for a divorce, after photo evidence of a young male British holiday-goer 'motorboating' on Paula's chest and inviting him and his friends to her apartment, whilst on holiday in Tenerife, was leaked to a newspaper. She claimed he requested his wife to wear a catsuit when she next visited him, a suggestion she rejected. On 29 July 2019, Williamson, aged 38, was found dead at her home in Stoke-on-Trent. Her death was not considered suspicious by the police.

In 2017, Bronson contacted newspaper photographer George Bamby after recognizing his name on a Channel 4 documentary. After meeting, Bronson gave Bamby hair samples for DNA testing. Bamby has since produced a certificate claiming that there is a 99.98% chance that he is Bronson's son. In March 2023, however, Bamby later claimed the entire relationship was fabricated in a publicity stunt arranged between the two.

In November 2018, Bronson was found not guilty at Leeds Crown Court after being tried for attempting to cause grievous bodily harm with intent. The incident the previous January had involved Mark Docherty, the governor at Wakefield prison. "For the first time in 44 years in prison, I never intended to be violent. I never meant to hurt the governor", Bronson told the court via Videolink, while defending himself. Shortly after his acquittal, he was moved to HM Prison Woodhill.

In June 2020, Bronson won a High Court battle for the right for his parole board meeting to be held in public, citing the right to a fair trial.

In early 2023, it was reported that Bronson would go before the parole board in March of that year. He was denied parole, with the parole board stating that it "was not satisfied that Mr. Salvador was suitable for release. Nor did the panel recommend to the secretary of state that he should be transferred to an open prison."

On 17 November 2026, Bronson was again denied parole due to his having committed "further incidents of violence against staff and other prisoners".

== Occupations and projects ==
While in prison, Bronson developed a fitness regime and in 2008 claimed he could still do 172 press-ups in 60 seconds and 94 sit-ups in 30 seconds. In 2002, he published the book Solitary Fitness, detailing an individual training process with minimal resources and space.

I'm the king of the press-ups and the sit-ups. I've already said I once did 25 press-ups with two men on my back, and I've squatted with three men on my shoulders! I've been making prison fitness records for as long as I can remember. Show me another man – a man half my age – who can pick up a full-size snooker table. I can. Show me another guy who can rip out 1,727 press-ups in an hour. I can ... I once went eight years without using weights, then I went into a gym and bench pressed 300lb ten times. I'm 5ft 11in, I weigh 220lb and I feel as strong as did when I was 21 ... There's something deep inside me that pushes me on. I'm a solitary fitness survivor.

— Writing in 2000, Bronson describes the outcome of years of training in the confined spaces in prison.

Since 1999, Bronson has occupied himself by writing poetry and producing artworks. He has had eleven books published, including in 2008 his only self-penned book Loonyology: In My Own Words. He has won 11 Koestler Trust Awards for his poetry and art.

On 28 April 2010, BBC News reported that artwork by Bronson was displayed on the London Underground at Angel tube station from 26 April 2010 for two weeks. The display was organised by Art Below, which is unrelated to the official Transport For London art programme. The National Victims' Association, which represents families affected by crime, queried the desirability of allowing Bronson "to engage with the British public in this way". His work was soon removed by an unknown party for unexplained reasons.

In 2014, The Guardian reported that the sale of several of Bronson's artworks, which were formerly owned by Ronnie Kray, raised several thousand pounds for his mother to have a holiday. It followed her being upset after Bronson's reported attack against 12 prison guards at HMP Woodhill.

In 2016, he auctioned one of his artworks to raise money for the treatment of a child with cerebral palsy.

In 2021, Bronson, under the name Charles Arthur Salvador, was featured on the single "Only Mad Men Crawl" by the Ayia Napa-based recording act Lost Vegas.

In 2023, Bronson put his drawings for sale at an exhibition, which he hoped could increase his chance for getting parole by demonstrating that he could have an occupation if released from prison.

== Biographical film ==
The film, Bronson, which loosely follows Bronson's life, was released in Britain on 13 March 2008. It stars Tom Hardy in the eponymous role, and is directed by Nicolas Winding Refn. Controversy was caused at the premiere when a recording of Bronson's voice was played with no prior permission granted by officers at HM Prison Service, who called for an inquiry into how the recording had been made.

== See also ==
- Maria Pearson – Britain's longest-serving female prisoner, similarly imprisoned since 1987 due to repeated disruptive behaviour while incarcerated

== Selected works ==
- Bronson, Charles; Richards, Stephen (1999). The Charles Bronson Book of Poems: Birdman Opens His Mind Bk. 1 (1 May 1999 ed.). Mirage Publishing. ISBN 1-902578-03-1. - Total pages: 78
- Bronson, Charles; Richards, Stephen (1999). Silent Scream: The Charles Bronson Story (5 September 1999 ed.). Mirage Publishing. ISBN 1-902578-08-2. - Total pages: 248
- Bronson, Charles; Richards, Stephen (2000). Legends (19 September 2000 ed.). Mirage Publishing. ISBN 1-902578-11-2. - Total pages: 200
- Bronson, Charles; Richards, Stephen (14 October 2002). Solitary Fitness (first, paperback ed.). Mirage Publishing. ISBN 1-902578-12-0. - Total pages: 220
- Bronson, Charles (October 2004). Bronson (8 October 2004 ed.). John Blake Publishing Ltd. ISBN 1-85782-522-5.- Total pages: 304
- Bronson, Charles; Richards, Stephen (March 2004). Insanity: My Mad Life (31 March 2004 ed.). John Blake Publishing Ltd. ISBN 1-84454-030-8. - Total pages: 335
- Bronson, Charles; Richards, Stephen (2007). The Krays and Me (30 April 2007 ed.). John Blake Publishing Ltd. ISBN 978-1-84454-325-0. - Total pages: 288
- Bronson, Charles (2008). Loonyology: In My Own Words (2 November 2009 ed.). Apex Publishing Ltd. ISBN 978-1-906358-11-2.- Total pages: 466
- Bronson, Charles (2009). Diaries from Hell: Charles Bronson – My Prison Diaries (1 May 2009 ed.). Y Lolfa. ISBN 978-1-84771-116-8.- Total pages: 464
- Bronson, Charles; Currie, Tel (2005). Heroes and Villains: The Good, the Mad, the Bad and the Ugly (5 August 2005 ed.). John Blake Publishing Ltd. ISBN 1-84454-118-5. - Total pages: 288
- Bronson, Charles; Richards, Stephen (31 January 2007). Solitary Fitness (second, paperback ed.). John Blake Publishing Ltd. ISBN 978-1-84454-309-0. - Total pages: 262
- Bronson, Charles; Richards, Stephen (2007). The Good Prison Guide (28 February 2007 ed.). John Blake Publishing Ltd. ISBN 978-1-84454-359-5. - Total pages: 288
- Bronson, Charles (2009). Emmins, Mark (ed.). Con-artist (19 December 2008 ed.). Matador. ISBN 978-1-84876-048-6. - Total pages: 108
- Bronson, Charles; Richards, Stephen (February 2010). Bronson 2 – More Porridge Than Goldilocks (2 November 2009 ed.). John Blake Publishing Ltd. ISBN 978-1-84454-860-6. - Total pages: 288
- Bronson, Charles; Richards, Stephen (2010). Bronson 3 – Up on the roof (6 September 2010 ed.). John Blake Publishing Ltd. ISBN 978-1-84358-190-1. - Total pages: 288
