= Booktrope =

Book Publisher

- Founder: Andy Roberts, Katherine Sears, Heather Ludviksson and Ken Shear
- Country of origin: United States
- Headquarters location: Seattle, WA
- Distribution: Worldwide
- Publication types: Books, E-books
- Imprints: Forsaken, Gravity, Edge, Entice, Vox Dei
- Official website: www.booktrope.com

Booktrope (founded 2010, ceased operations 2016) was a Seattle-based hybrid publisher which specialized in community-based team publishing. Applying a "team publishing" model, under which authors, editors, designers and marketing managers shared revenue, the company published approximately 1000 books in print and ebook formats. It ceased operations as of May 31, 2016.

== History ==
Booktrope grew rapidly from its founding in 2010 until 2016, publishing many books that made best seller lists and giving hundreds of new authors opportunity to release works. The company was selected for Y Combinator in winter, 2015, having previously won the Seattle Angel Conference competition in November 2013. The company attracted attention for innovation in publishing

In April, 2016, Booktrope's management determined that its business model was no longer financially viable due to changes in the book market, and conducted a managed shutdown of the business, paying authors and other creative team members all royalties earned and providing source files that authors could use to republish their books.

== See also ==
- List of English language book publishers
- Publishing
