= The Briefing =

- Editor: Tony Payne
- Categories: Christianity
- Frequency: Monthly
- Publisher: Matthias Media; The Good Book Company
- First issue: 24 February 1988
- Final issue: 2014
- Company: Matthias Media
- Country: Australia; UK
- Language: English
- Website: www.matthiasmedia.com.au/briefing
- ISSN: 1032-5069

The Briefing was an evangelical Christian magazine published by Matthias Media in partnership with The Good Book Company (UK). It was printed monthly, and was circulated in Australia, North America and the United Kingdom. Although it was contributed by and targeted towards Christians of all denominations, the magazine had a distinctly Sydney Anglican slant. The magazine existed between 1988 and 2014.

== History and profile ==
The magazine was founded in 1988 by Phillip Jensen, who is Dean of St. Andrew's Cathedral, Sydney and brother of former Archbishop of Sydney Peter Jensen. Tony Payne served as the editor of the magazine.

The Briefing promoted conservative evangelical theology and comments on current events from an evangelical viewpoint. It also featured book reviews and Bible studies. The magazine was published by Matthias Media from 1988 to 2014 when it ceased publication.

== See also ==
- Gordon Cheng
