= Stephen Richards (author) =

British author

Stephen Richards is an author writing in the self-help genre. The first book he wrote in 1998 was in the true crime genre for Mirage Publishing. He has co-written a number of books with others, but now concentrates on writing in the mind, body, spirit subjects of Cosmic Ordering and mind power.

The best known works of Stephen Richards are probably The Cosmic Ordering Guide. and the co-authored book of Solitary Fitness. He has also worked on TV and radio.

He produced and directed the three-hour video documentary Sincerely Yours about UK prisoner Charles Bronson. In 2000, the then Home Secretary Jack Straw was granted an injunction banning the release of Sincerely Yours, on the grounds that it included footage of Bronson terrorizing a hostage in prison, whose copyright was owned by the prison, according to Straw . Having refused to withdraw the video saw Richards given a prison sentence (suspended) and he had to incur court costs of £64,000. The video was later released in an edited version by Mirage Publishing, but was later totally withdrawn for what Richards claimed were personal reasons.

Writing true crime books as an investigative journalist for Blake Publishing from early 2000 to 2006 saw him change from writing about the perpetrator to the victim of crime. His crime writing came to an end when he moved away from this genre, citing the way crime was being glamorised and how the victim was neglected.

From 2006 he restarted Mirage Publishing and turned his back on true crime writing, vowing never again to write in this genre, totally concentrating on writing mind, body and spirit books and publishing new authors.

His professional background is in clinical hypnotherapy and stress counselling. He was previously a member of the British Association of Counsellors and was affiliated to their Family Sexual Division, Disaster Team and Stress Counselling for Students Division.

He currently applies his time to self-help publications, running his property development empire, and helping others.

== Bibliography ==
- Richards, Stephen (1 April 1998). Public Consumer Enemy: The A-Z Handbook of How to Complain and Win! (first, paperback ed.). Mirage Publishing. ISBN 978-1-902578-02-6.- Total pages: 200
- Richards, Stephen (29 July 1998). Viv (Graham) – Simply the Best (first, paperback ed.). Mirage Publishing. ISBN 1-90257-800-7.- Total pages: 249
- Richards, Stephen (5 November 1998). Viv and the Geordie Mafia Vol.2 (first, paperback ed.). Mirage Publishing. ISBN 1-90257-801-5.- Total pages: 339
- Bronson, Charles; Richards, Stephen (1 May 1999). The Charles Bronson Book of Poems: Birdman Opens His Mind Bk. 1 (hardback ed.). Mirage. ISBN 1-902578-03-1. - Total pages: 78
- Bronson, Charles; Richards, Stephen (5 September 1999). Silent Scream: The Charles Bronson Story (hardback ed.). Mirage. ISBN 1-902578-08-2. - Total pages: 248
- Pyle, Joseph; Richards, Stephen (5 November 1999). Looking at Life (first, paperback ed.). Mirage Publishing. ISBN 1-90257-809-0. - Total pages:100
- Richards, Stephen (19 June 2000). Ramradiers (first, paperback ed.). Mirage Publishing. ISBN 1-90257-810-4.- Total pages: 208
- Richards, Stephen (1 July 2000). Sincerely Yours – The Charles Bronson Documentary (Video Documentary ed.). Mirage Publishing. ISBN 1-90257-819-8.- Total pages: 2.5 hours
- Bronson, Charles; Richards, Stephen (19 September 2000). Legends (first, hardback ed.). Mirage Publishing. ISBN 1-90257-811-2. - Total pages: 200
- Richards, Stephen (5 November 2001). Viv (Graham): Final Chapter v. 3 (first, paperback ed.). Mirage Publishing. ISBN 1-90257-816-3.- Total pages: 300
- Bronson, Charles; Richards, Stephen (14 October 2002). Solitary Fitness (first, paperback ed.). Mirage Publishing. ISBN 1-90257-812-0. - Total pages: 220
- Richards, Stephen (5 November 2002). Viv Graham and Lee Duffy's Parallel Lives (first, hardback ed.). Mirage Publishing. ISBN 1-90257-820-1.- Total pages: 300
- Bronson, Charles; Richards, Stephen (25 January 2003). Insanity: My Mad Life (first, hardback ed.). John Blake Publishing Ltd. ISBN 1-90403-431-4. - Total pages: 335
- Richards, Stephen (1 April 2003). Crime Through Time (first, hardback ed.). Mirage Publishing. ISBN 978-1-902578-17-0.- Total pages: 555
- Bronson, Charles; Richards, Stephen (1 July 2003). Legends (paperback ed.). Mirage Publishing. ISBN 1-90257-822-8. - Total pages: 324
- Bronson, Charles; Richards, Stephen (1 July 2003). Silent Scream (first, paperback ed.). Mirage Publishing. ISBN 1-90257-821-X. - Total pages:214
- Price, Malcolm; Richards, Stephen (5 September 2003). Street Warrior (first, hardback ed.). John Blake Publishing Ltd. ISBN 1-90403-463-2. - Total pages: 288
- Bronson, Charles; Richards, Stephen (27 February 2004). The Good Prison Guide (first, hardback ed.). John Blake Publishing Ltd. ISBN 1-84454-022-7. - Total pages: 307
- Roberts, Caroline; Richards, Stephen (28 February 2004). The Lost Girl (first, hardback ed.). Metro Books (London). ISBN 1-84358-088-8. - Total pages: 278
- Bronson, Charles; Richards, Stephen (31 March 2004). Insanity: My Mad Life (first, paperback ed.). John Blake Publishing Ltd. ISBN 1-84454-030-8. - Total pages: 335
- Bronson, Charles; Richards, Stephen (4 June 2004). The Krays and Me (hardback ed.). John Blake Publishing Ltd. ISBN 1-84454-042-1. - Total pages: 288
- Crosbie, James; Richards, Stephen (30 September 2004). It's Criminal (hardback ed.). John Blake Publishing Ltd. ISBN 1-84454-059-6. - Total pages: 288
- Roberts, Caroline; Richards, Stephen (8 April 2005). The Lost Girl (paperback ed.). Metro Books (London). ISBN 1-84358-148-5. - Total pages: 288
- Horsley, Richy; Richards, Stephen (1 June 2005). Born to Fight (first, hardback ed.). John Blake Publishing Ltd. ISBN 1-84454-096-0. - Total pages: 288
- Richards, Stephen (30 June 2005). Viv Graham (first, paperback ed.). John Blake Publishing Ltd. ISBN 1-84454-127-4.- Total pages: 288
- Richards, Stephen (8 July 2005). Crash N Carry (first, paperback ed.). John Blake Publishing Ltd. ISBN 1-84454-106-1.- Total pages: 256
- Cockerill, Brian; Richards, Stephen (12 August 2005). Tax Man (first, hardback ed.). John Blake Publishing Ltd. ISBN 1-84454-134-7. - Total pages: 288
- Holland, Jimmy; Richards, Stephen (19 August 2005). Lost in Care (hardback ed.). John Blake Publishing Ltd. ISBN 1-84454-161-4. - Total pages: 288
- Giblin, Hailey; Richards, Stephen (24 March 2006). Hailey's Story (first, hardback ed.). John Blake Publishing Ltd. ISBN 1-84454-191-6. - Total pages: 288
- Richards, Stephen (26 May 2006). Fight to the Death: Viv Graham and Lee Duffy – Too Hard to Live, Too Young to Die (first, paperback ed.). John Blake Publishing Ltd. ISBN 1-84454-245-9.- Total pages: 288
- Richards, Stephen (6 June 2006). Cosmic Ordering Guide: Where Dreams Can Become Reality (first, paperback ed.). Mirage Publishing. ISBN 1-90257-824-4.- Total pages: 192
- Holland, Jimmy; Richards, Stephen (15 June 2006). Scottish Hard Bastards (first, hardback ed.). John Blake Publishing Ltd. ISBN 1-84454-242-4. - Total pages: 288
- Moyle, Stephen; Richards, Stephen (30 June 2006). Psycho Steve (hardback ed.). John Blake Publishing Ltd. ISBN 1-84454-251-3. - Total pages: 291
- Price, Malcolm; Richards, Stephen (28 July 2006). Street Warrior (paperback ed.). John Blake Publishing Ltd. ISBN 1-84454-299-8. - Total pages: 288
- Bronson, Charles; Richards, Stephen (23 December 2006). The Good Prison Guide (paperback ed.). John Blake Publishing Ltd. ISBN 1-84454-359-5. - Total pages: 288
- Holland, Jimmy; Richards, Stephen (31 January 2007). Lost in Care (paperback ed.). John Blake Publishing Ltd. ISBN 978-1-84454-361-8. - Total pages: 288
- Bronson, Charles; Richards, Stephen (31 January 2007). Solitary Fitness (second, paperback ed.). John Blake Publishing Ltd. ISBN 978-1-84454-309-0. - Total pages: 262
- Gould, Lynette; Richards, Stephen (28 February 2007). Heart of Darkness (hardback ed.). John Blake Publishing Ltd. ISBN 978-1-84454-321-2. - Total pages: 288
- Bronson, Charles; Richards, Stephen (30 April 2007). The Krays and Me (paperback ed.). John Blake Publishing Ltd. ISBN 978-1-84454-325-0. - Total pages: 288
- Crosbie, James; Richards, Stephen (31 May 2007). Armed and Dangerous (paperback ed.). John Blake Publishing Ltd. ISBN 978-1-84454-389-2. - Total pages: 288
- Richards, Stephen (7 July 2007). Cosmic Ordering: Oracle Wish Cards (Cards & Booklet (Box Set) ed.). Mirage Publishing. ISBN 978-1-90257-827-9.- Total pages: 60
- Richards, Stephen (7 July 2007). The Cosmic Ordering Service: 101 Orders for Daily Use (first, paperback ed.). Mirage Publishing. ISBN 978-1-90257-823-1.- Total pages: 178
- Holland, Jimmy; Richards, Stephen (3 September 2007). Scottish Hard Bastards (paperback ed.). John Blake Publishing Ltd. ISBN 978-1-84454-459-2. - Total pages: 288
- Cockerill, Brian; Richards, Stephen (31 October 2007). Tax Man (paperback ed.). John Blake Publishing Ltd. ISBN 978-1-84454-488-2. - Total pages: 288
- Richards, Stephen (5 November 2007). Cosmic Ordering Healing Oracle Cards (Cards & Booklet ed.). Mirage Publishing. ISBN 978-1-90257-829-3.- Total pages: 67
- Richards, Stephen (20 March 2008). Cosmic Ordering: Chakra Clearing (Audiobook, cards & booklet (Box Set) ed.). Mirage Publishing. ISBN 978-1-90257-833-0.- Total pages: 47
- Horsley, Richy; Richards, Stephen (2 June 2008). Born to Fight (paperback ed.). John Blake Publishing Ltd. ISBN 978-1-84454-556-8. - Total pages: 288
- Gould, Lynette; Richards, Stephen (2 June 2008). Heart of Darkness (paperback ed.). John Blake Publishing Ltd. ISBN 978-1-84454-605-3. - Total pages: 288
- Giblin, Hailey; Richards, Stephen (4 August 2008). Hailey's Story (paperback ed.). John Blake Publishing Ltd. ISBN 978-1-84454-621-3. - Total pages: 262
- Richards, Stephen (1 April 2009). Cosmic Ordering: You Can be Successful (first, paperback ed.). Mirage Publishing. ISBN 978-1-90257-846-0.- Total pages: 390
- Richards, Stephen (9 September 2009). Cosmic Ordering: Sex Energy (first, paperback ed.). Mirage Publishing. ISBN 978-1-90257-847-7.- Total pages: 222
- Bronson, Charles; Richards, Stephen (2 November 2009). Bronson 2 – More Porridge Than Goldilocks (paperback ed.). John Blake Publishing Ltd. ISBN 978-1-84454-860-6. - Total pages: 288
- Richards, Stephen (29 April 2010). Overcoming Self-Limiting Beliefs (Kindle ed.). Mirage Publishing. ASIN B004WWQ7DQ.- Total pages: 150
- Bronson, Charles; Richards, Stephen (6 September 2010). Bronson 3 – Up on the roof (paperback ed.). John Blake Publishing Ltd. ISBN 978-1-84358-190-1. - Total pages: 288
- Richards, Stephen (17 April 2011). Think Your way to Success: Let Your Dreams Run Free (Kindle ed.). Mirage Publishing. ASIN B004X1UF20.- Total pages: 220
- Richards, Stephen (18 April 2011). Boost Your Self Esteem (Kindle ed.). Mirage Publishing. ASIN B004X75P5G.- Total pages: 125
- Richards, Stephen (29 April 2011). 7 Day Focusing Plan (Kindle ed.). Mirage Publishing. ASIN B005V1FLL6.- Total pages: 37
- Richards, Stephen; Richards, Stephen (6 June 2011). Gang Wars of the North: The Inside Story of the Deadly Battle Between Viv Graham and Lee Duffy (first, paperback ed.). John Blake Publishing Ltd. ISBN 978-1-84358-380-6. - Total pages: 288
- Richards, Stephen (6 September 2011). Forgiveness and Love Conquers All: Healing the Emotional Self (Inspiration Mini-Series) (first, signed paperback ed.). Mirage Publishing. ISBN 978-1-90257-873-6.- Total pages: 114
- Richards, Stephen (12 October 2011). Overcoming Procrastination (Kindle ed.). Mirage Publishing. ASIN B005V7AYKI.- Total pages: 156
- Richards, Stephen (16 November 2011). 7 Day Confidence and Ego-Boost Affirmation Plan (Kindle ed.). Mirage Publishing. ASIN B0068UASHQ.- Total pages: 20
- Richards, Stephen (18 November 2011). Chakra Clearing: Restore your grip on life with only your mind (Kindle ed.). Mirage Publishing. ASIN B0069ZCBDY.- Total pages: 77
- Richards, Stephen (5 December 2011). Develop Jedi Self-Confidence: Unleash the Force within You (Kindle ed.). Mirage Publishing. ASIN B006IHH2SM.- Total pages: 143
- Richards, Stephen (14 December 2011). Cosmic Ordering Guide: Where Dreams Can Become Reality (Kindle ed.). Mirage Publishing. ASIN B006MHTU06.- Total pages: 221
- Richards, Stephen (24 December 2011). Cosmic Ordering: Sex Energy (Kindle ed.). Mirage Publishing. ASIN B006PYXR64.- Total pages: 211
- Richards, Stephen (14 January 2012). PUBLIC consumer ENEMY: A-Z of how to complain and win! (Kindle ed.). Mirage Publishing. ASIN B006XNVLNS.- Total pages: 224
- Roberts, Caroline; Richards, Stephen (4 June 2012). The One That Got Away (paperback ed.). John Blake Publishing Ltd. ISBN 978-1-84358-952-5. - Total pages: 288
- Richards, Stephen (16 July 2012). Six Step Success Plan: Achieve the life of your dreams! (Kindle ed.). Mirage Publishing. ASIN B008LZRKF4.- Total pages: 155
- Roberts, Caroline; Richards, Stephen (21 November 2012). The One That Got Away – How I Escaped Death at the Hands of Fred and Rose West (paperback large print ed.). ReadHowYouWant. ISBN 978-1-45964-758-9. - Total pages: 316
- Richards, Stephen (22 November 2012). The Cosmic Ordering Wish Book 2013 (paperback ed.). Mirage Publishing. ISBN 978-1-84771-116-8.- Total pages: 176
- Richards, Stephen (December 2012). Gang Wars of the North: The Inside Story of the Deadly Battle Between Viv Graham and Lee Duffy (Kindle ed.). John Blake Publishing Ltd. ASIN B00AHGSVIA.- Total pages: 268
- Crosbie, James; Richards, Stephen (December 2012). Armed and Dangerous – This is the True Story of How I Carried Out Scotland's Biggest Bank Robbery (Kindle ed.). John Blake Publishing Ltd. ASIN B00AHGF0SO. - Total pages: 332
- Holland, Jimmy; Richards, Stephen (December 2012). Scottish Hard Bastards (Kindle ed.). John Blake Publishing Ltd. ASIN B00AHGGDFS. - Total pages: 250
- Bronson, Charles; Richards, Stephen (December 2012). Bronson 2 – More Porridge Than Goldilocks (Kindle ed.). John Blake Publishing Ltd. ASIN B00AHG9SI2. - Total pages: 304
- Bronson, Charles; Richards, Stephen (December 2012). Bronson 3 – Up on the roof (Kindle ed.). John Blake Publishing Ltd. ASIN B00ALU7LWY. - Total pages: 308
- Roberts, Caroline; Richards, Stephen (December 2012). The One That Got Away – How I Escaped Death at the Hands of Fred and Rose West (Kindle ed.). John Blake Publishing Ltd. ASIN B00ALU7KFM. - Total pages: 278
- Cockerill, Brian; Richards, Stephen (December 2012). Tax Man (Kindle ed.). John Blake Publishing Ltd. ASIN B00ALU7QOM. - Total pages: 268
- Horsley, Richy; Richards, Stephen (December 2012). Born to Fight (Kindle ed.). John Blake Publishing Ltd. ASIN B00ALU7J08. - Total pages: 266
- Bronson, Charles; Richards, Stephen (December 2012). Insanity: My Mad Life (Kindle ed.). John Blake Publishing Ltd. ASIN B00ALU7VDI. - Total pages: 335
- Holland, Jimmy; Richards, Stephen (December 2012). Lost in Care – The True Story of a Forgotten Child (Kindle ed.). John Blake Publishing Ltd. ASIN B00AHGH3WU. - Total pages: 352
- Moyle, Stephen; Richards, Stephen (December 2012). Psycho Steve – I Swam The Solent to Freedom – No Jail can Hold Me (Kindle ed.). John Blake Publishing Ltd. ASIN B00AHGTCV0. - Total pages: 305
- Price, Malcolm; Richards, Stephen (December 2012). Street Warrior – The True Story of The Legendary Malcolm Price, Britain's Hardest Man (Kindle ed.). John Blake Publishing Ltd. ASIN B00ALU7A7A. - Total pages: 288
