= Caister Academic Press =

Independent academic publication

- Caister Academic Press
- Status: Active
- Founded: 1993
- Country of origin: United Kingdom
- Headquarters location: Poole, UK
- Nonfiction topics: Microbiology, Molecular Biology
- Imprints: Caister Academic Press, Horizon Scientific Press, Horizon Bioscience
- Official website: www.caister.com

Caister Academic Press is an independent academic publishing company that produces books and ebooks on microbiology and molecular biology. The address for the editorial offices is in Poole, UK with worldwide sales and distribution through the Ingram Content Group. Published books include review volumes, practical manuals and reference texts aimed at the post-graduate, research and professional market.

== Aims and scope ==
Caister Academic Press aims to provide the scientific community with authoritative texts on topical areas of microbiology and molecular biology. There is a focus on current research and emerging trends. Volumes on related technology and applications are also published.

== History ==
The academic publishing company was founded in 1993 as Horizon Scientific Press. Incorporated as a limited company in 2001, the company changed its name to Caister Academic Press in 2008.
