= New Win Publishing =

American book publisher

- Parent company: Academic Learning Company
- Founded: 1974
- Country of origin: United States
- Headquarters location: El Monte, California
- Publication types: Books
- Imprints: Winchester Press, WBusiness Books, ZHealth Books
- Official website: newwinpublishing.com

New Win Publishing is a book publisher based in El Monte, California. New Win Publishing is owned by Academic Learning Company, LLC.

== History ==
Academic Learning Company, LLC traces its roots as an academic and educational publisher to D. Appleton & Company (Boston, 1813) which later became Appleton-Century-Crofts (New York). Appleton Century Crofts was the American publisher of the two-volume New Century Dictionary and New Century Encyclopedia, the premier reference materials in the 19th century.

In the 1970s, Appleton Century Croft was sold to Meredith Publishing. Later, in 1974 Charles Walther purchased the New Century division from Meredith in an early management buyout. In 1981, New Century acquired Follett Publishing and Winchester Press in 1982. In 1990, Frank Gil purchased New Century Publishing and changed the company name to New Win Publishing Inc.
In November 2003, Academic Learning Company, LLC from California acquired New Win Publishing Inc.'s assets and divided New Win Publishing into two divisions. Velázquez Press is the educational publishing division focused on publishing reference and educational books for schools. New Win Publishing has three imprints: Winchester Press, WBusiness Books, and ZHealth Books. WBusiness Books publishes books of interest to the business community. It published Wall Street Journal bestseller From Lifeguard To Sun King: The Man Behind the Banana Boat Success Stories in 2008, written by Robert Bell, the founder of the Banana Boat sun care brand.

In February 2008 Academic Learning Company, LLC added a new division, WBusiness Speakers. This became the speaking and consulting division for the book publisher.

== See also ==
- List of English-language book publishing companies
