= Monstrous Regiment Publishing =

Micro Publisher from Edinburgh

Monstrous Regiment Publishing Ltd
- Founded: 2017
- Founder: Lauren Nickodemus, Ellen Desmond
- Country of origin: Scotland
- Official website: https://www.leithbooks.com/

Monstrous Regiment Publishing, now known as Leith Books is an independent publisher based in Edinburgh. The company was set up by Ellen Desmond and Lauren Nickodemus, two graduates of Edinburgh Napier University. It publishes texts that focus on "intersectional feminism, sexuality and gender."

== Background ==
Desmond and Nickodemus decided to set up Monstrous Regiment Publishing after graduating from a publishing course at Edinburgh Napier University. They were motivated to establish the company because many of their peers moved to London to seek employment in creative industries, citing a lack of opportunities in Scotland. The company is financed through online crowdfunding, and Desmond and Nickodemus run it part-time alongside their jobs.

The company is named after the John Knox's text The First Blast of the Trumpet Against the Monstruous Regiment of Women, which argued against women in government.

== Published works ==
Monstrous Regiment published The Bi-ble in 2017, "a non-fiction anthology about bisexuality," funded by a Kickstarter campaign. The book is made up of personal essays and was co-edited by Desmond. Prior to publishing, authors submitted essays over a six-week period before a month-long editing process. In an interview in April 2020, Desmond and Nickodemus stated that The Bi-ble came out of a desire to highlight issues and experiences around bisexuality. They also fundraised to create a second volume of The Bi-ble, Volume Two: New Testimonials, which was published in 2019.

Monstrous Regiment also developed another anthology titled So Hormonal: Personal Stories About Hormones.

The company is also publishing a magazine of feminist fiction, poems, and art by Scottish contributors.

Monstrous Regiment published their first full-length work of fiction in March 2021, a coming-of-age novel called Duck Feet by Ely Percy. It went on to win Scotland’s Book Of The Year at the Saltire Society’s award ceremony in November of the same year.
