= J. Q. Preble =

19th-century book publisher

J. Q. Preble was a small publisher which was based in New York City. They published several children's books from 1851 to 1865. Many of these books have detailed wood engravings. The publisher often did not put publication dates or author names in the books.

== Selected works ==
- ''Gift of Piety; or, Divine Breathings. - n.d.
- The Wonders of a Toy Shop. - n.d. 185?
- Blackberry Girl by Nancy Sproat - c. 1840
- The history of the children in the wood - c. 1855
- Lilly of the Valley, or Cousin Lill's Stories for Her Pets. - c. 1855
- The Little Robinson Crusoe. - 1855
- Fairy tales for children. Susie Sunbeam. - 1859
- Stories about insects. Susie Sunbeam. - 1859
