= Summerwild Productions =

Summerwild Productions logo.

Summerwild Productions is a Canadian independent book publisher.

Originally based in Gibsons, BC, a small town on British Columbia's Sunshine Coast, the company was founded in 1987 by former president Ken Budd, and is owned and operated by previous managing editor Robert Marthaller. Summerwild has produced and/or published over 40 titles, mainly consisting of non-fiction coffee table photography books featuring wildlife and the environment. Later works include the educational series The Adventures of Buddy Williams, which features four installments, SummerWild, FallGently, WinterFree and SprinRush, all accompanied by Student Study Guides.

== Publications ==
Notable publications

- Touch the Magic, A Photographic Essay of Greater Vancouver was runner-up for the Bill Duthie Booksellers’ choice in 1986.
- Carmanah, Artistic Visions of an Ancient Rainforest won the Roderick Haig-Brown Regional Prize and the Bill Duthie Booksellers’ Choice from the BC Book Prizes Program in 1990.
- The Elders Are Watching was selected by The Canadian Children’s Book Centre as an ‘Our Choice’ title in 1990.
- If You’re Not From the Prairie was the runner-up for the Sheila A. Egoff Children’s Literature Prize from the BC Book Prizes Program in 1993 and was also selected as ‘Our Choice’.

Chronology of all productions, publications, consulting projects

- Touch the Magic, A Photographic Essay of Greater Vancouver (1985) - a hardcover photo essay - Philip Hersee, photographer, & Ken Budd, writer - 37,000 copies
- Nepal, A Photographic Essay (1987) - a hardcover photo essay - Sandra Gibson, photographer & writer - 3,000 copies
- Wild Whales, Killer, Gray & Humpback Whales (1987) - a hard & soft cover photo essay - Dr. James Darling, writer, and a number of wildlife photographers - 20,000 copies
- Calgary, Cowboys and Kananaskis Country (1987) - a hardcover photo essay - Cameron Young, photographer, & Ken Budd, writer - 15,000 copies
- Solstice, The Art of Roy Henry Vickers [Trade] (1988) - a hardcover art book - Roy Henry Vickers, writer & artist - 18,000 copies
- Solstice, The Art of Roy Henry Vickers [Limited Edition] (1988) - a hardcover, limited edition art book - Roy Henry Vickers, writer & artist - 100 copies
- An Artist's Vision (1989) - a hardcover art book - Sue Coleman, writer & artist - 12,500 copies
- Carmanah, Artistic Visions of an Ancient Rainforest (1989) - a hard & soft cover art/environment book - noted essayists & artists - 21,500 copies
- The Elders are Watching (1990) - a soft cover art/environment book - Roy Henry Vickers, artist, & Dave Bouchard, writer - 77,000 copies; four languages
- Broken Wing (1990) - a hard & soft cover novel - Stewart Dickson, author - 7,500 copies
- Clayoquot, On the Wild Side (1990) - a hardcover photo essay/environment book - Adrian Dorst, photographer, & Cameron Young, writer - 10,000 copies
- The Sacred Earth (1991) - a hardcover photo essay - Courtenay Milne, photographer & writer - consultant to the photographer/writer and publisher - 10,000 copies
- The Wild Life of Bill Keay (1992) - a hard & soft cover photo essay/nature book - Bill Keay, photographer, and Wanda Keay & Jeff Morgan, writers - 11,000 copies
- Parade to Paradise (1992) - a hardcover children’s book - Charles van Sandwyk, writer & artist - 5,500 copies
- West Coast, Homeland of Mist (1992) - a hard & soft cover art book; full colour - Carol Evans, artist, and Bryn King & Carol Evans, writers - 11,100 copies
- Tatshenshini RiverWild (1993) - a hard & soft cover photo essay/environment book - noted essayists, including U.S. Vice President Gore and former Prime Minister Pierre Trudeau, and numerous famous outdoor photographers - 14,000 copies
- If You’re not From the Prairie (1993) - a hardcover art/poetry book; full colour - Henry Riplinger, artist, & Dave Bouchard, poet - 135,000 copies
- The Amazing Live Christmas Tree (1993) - a hardcover children’s book; full colour - Marcella Betzler, writer, & Deborah Martin, illustrator - 5,000 copies
- Salmon of the Pacific (1994) - a soft cover environment book; full colour - Adam Lewis, writer & assorted photographers - 5,000 copies
- Hiking on the Edge, Canada’s West Coast Trail (1995) - a soft cover adventure book; full colour - Ian Gill, writer, & David Nunuk, photographer - 5,000 copies
- Spirit Transformed, A Journey From Tree To Totem (1996) - a hardcover adventure & art book - Roy Henry Vickers, artist, Brian Payton, writer, & Bob Herger, photographer - 5,000 copies
- Brent Heighton, Artist (1997) - a hardcover art book - Brent Heighton, artist, & Ken Budd, writer - 3,000 copies
- Releasing the Light, The Art of Carol Evans (1997) - a hardcover art book - Carol Evans, artist & writer, and Ken Budd, editor - 5,000 copies
- Vancouver, Living the Moment: A Photographic Essay of Metro Vancouver (2009) - a hardcover photo essay - Bob Herger, photographer, Ken Budd, writer, and Robert Marthaller, editor - 10,000 copies printed
- The Adventures of Buddy Williams, Book I: SummerWild (2011) - softcover juvenile fiction - Ken Budd, writer, Robert Marthaller, editor - 1000 copies
- SummerWild Student Study Guide & Teacher/Parent Key (2011) - softcover novel study guide - Robert Marthaller, writer, Ken Budd, writer, and Robert Marthaller, editor - 1000 copies
- The Adventures of Buddy Williams, Book II: FallGently (2012) - softcover juvenile fiction - Ken Budd, writer, Robert Marthaller, editor - 750 copies
- FallGently Student Study Guide & Teacher/Parent Key (2012) - softcover novel study guide - Robert Marthaller, writer, Ken Budd, writer, and Robert Marthaller, editor - 750 copies
