= Christian Focus Publications =

UK publishing house

Coordinates: 57.79°N 3.86°W

- Founded: 1970s
- Country of origin: United Kingdom
- Headquarters location: Fearn, Scotland
- Distribution: Roundhouse Group (UK); Reformers Bookshop, Koorong (Australia); Sola Scriptura Ministries (Canada); Baker & Taylor Publisher Services(USA); Struik Christian Media (South Africa)
- Publication types: Books
- Official website: www.christianfocus.com

Christian Focus Publications (CFP) is a theologically conservative evangelical publishing house in the United Kingdom.

CFP was established in the early 1970s, and is located in Fearn, Ross-shire. The managing director is William Mackenzie.

CFP has four imprints:

- Christian Focus - popular adult titles
- CF4K - children's books
- Christian Heritage - reprints
- Mentor - scholarly works
