= Three Sirens Press =

New York based publisher

Three Sirens Press was a New York based publisher active in the 1930s. Publications include:

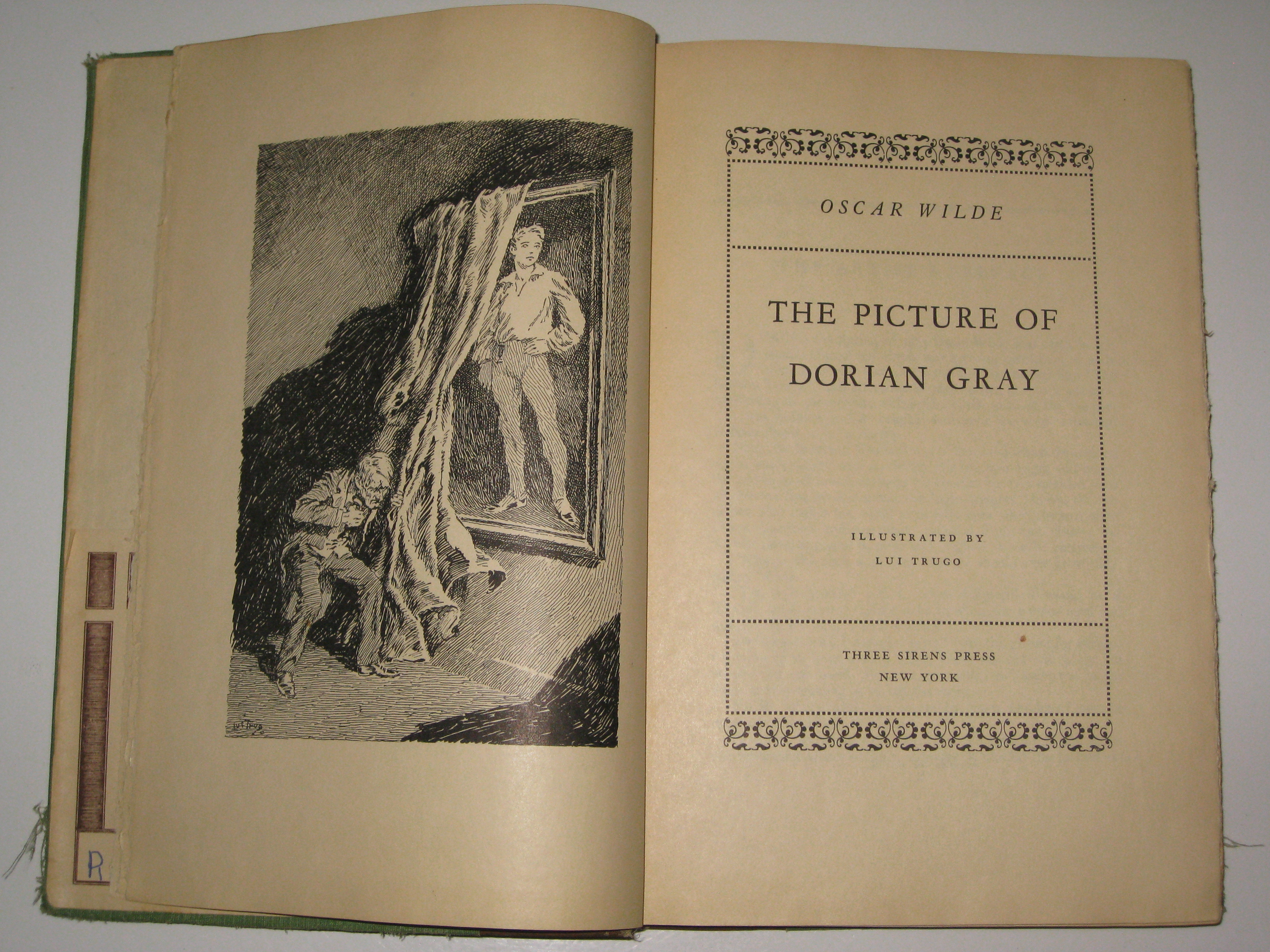
Oscar Wilde's The Picture of Dorian Gray published by Three Sirens Press, 1931.

- Oscar Wilde's Salome illustrated by Aubrey Beardsley (with some of the illustrations "sanitized")
- Oscar Wilde's The Picture of Dorian Gray illustrated by Lui Trugo
- Mark Twain’s The Adventures of Tom Sawyer illustrated By Richard Rogers
- The Adventures of Baron Munchausen illustrated by Gustave Doré
- Aristophanes’ Lysistrata, the Grecian temptress illustrated By Norman Lindsay
- Rubaiyat of Omar Khayyam illustrated By Edmund Sullivan
- Samuel Pepys' Diary illustrated By Randolph Adler
