= Christianity Explored =

Informal Christian evangelistic teaching course

Christianity Explored is an informal Christian evangelistic teaching course developed by Rico Tice and Barry Cooper at All Souls Church, Langham Place, a leading Anglican church, and published by The Good Book Company. The course is considered to stand within the conservative evangelical tradition. Christianity Explored Ministries has also developed a second evangelistic course in 2016 Life Explored.

== Course outline and versions ==
The third edition of the course was published on 10 May 2011. The sessions are:

1. Good News
2. Identity
3. Sin
4. The Cross
5. Resurrection
6. Grace
7. Come and Die

There is also a day away that features three bonus sessions: The Sower, James and John and Herod. Spin-offs include a youth version, revised in 2010 for two age groups: 11 to 14 years ("CY Nano") and 15 plus ("CY"). The seven session "Soul" DVD is designed to work with CY, and can also be used as a stand-alone resource. There is a follow-on course entitled "Discipleship Explored", written and presented by Barry Cooper, and "English Made Easy" editions of both Christianity Explored and Discipleship Explored. Christianity Explored publications are also available in Bulgarian, Dutch, German, Hindi, Hungarian, Italian, Luganda, Polish, Spanish, Swahili and Welsh. Translations in progress include French, Mandarin, Norwegian, Portuguese, Russian and Swedish. In 2011 the course, already being used in over 50 countries, was rolled out in the United States: it was endorsed by John Piper and Tim Keller.

== Use ==
The Church of England generally (e.g. in the 2003 publication "Evangelism - Which Way Now?") considers it, along with Alpha and the Emmaus Discipleship Course, as one of a "trinity" of courses covering all wings of the church. Other churches have also used the course: in 2006-7 the Presbyterian Church in Ireland’s board of youth and children's ministry used the youth version CY extensively with the Boys Brigades. It has also been used in Asia, with leader training run by the Methodist Church in Singapore.

The course is popular with conservative evangelical churches.

== Comparison with other evangelistic courses ==
Christianity Explored is distinguished from the Alpha Course by shorter videos in less formal settings, less charismatic emphasis on the Holy Spirit and by an expositional study of scripture – in this case Mark’s Gospel. 9 Marks comments that Christianity Explored is "plainly an answer to the Alpha course". It says that the course does a "fairly good job of explaining the gospel clearly" but finds it over-full of material, and holds the view that "the use of the sinners' prayer and immediate assurance is ... troubling." It credits Christianity Explored with "the best treatment of sin, giving it a whole session", along with a good treatment of grace and the atonement. This is in agreement with (or perhaps derivative from) a 2001 article in the British Evangelical Council magazine which commended Christianity Explored, in direct contrast to Alpha, for its teaching on grace, penal substitution and the Holy Spirit. The course has been described as a conservative evangelical alternative to the charismatic leanings of the Alpha Course.

The 2003 book 'Evangelism: Which Way Now?' offers a detailed examination of the benefits and drawbacks of Christianity Explored amongst other evangelistic courses and approaches to evangelism.

== See also ==
- Life Explored
- Alpha course
- Emmaus Course
- The Good Book Company
