= The Good Book Company =

British Christian publisher

- Founded: 1991
- Country of origin: United Kingdom
- Headquarters location: Epsom, Surrey, England
- Publication types: Books
- Nonfiction topics: Christianity
- Official website: www.thegoodbook.com

The Good Book Company (TGBC) is an evangelical Christian publisher, located in Epsom, Surrey, England. They are structured as a large unquoted, private company, limited by share capital. Their practices include publishing, mission outreach and training. The Publisher was declared runner up in the Christian Publisher of the Year Award by the Trade Body for Christian Publishing and Retailing in the UK.

== History ==
TGBC began in 1991 under the name St. Matthias Press UK, in response to what it saw as a "resurgence of Bible-based reformed evangelicalism in the UK." Their name was later changed to The Good Book Company in 2000. TGBC now supplies books, along with Bible study notes, to multiple countries including the UK, the US, Australia and the developing world.

In September 2026 TGBC became an Employee Owned Trust (EOT), and at the same time did a management restructure. The company is now led as Joint CEOs by James Burstow and Carl Laferton with an expanded Senior Leadership Team. The company is now owned by TGBC Trustees Ltd on behalf of the employees. The Trust is chaired by outgoing Publishing Director Tim Thornborough and the Trust Board includes former Direct Thomas Seidler, two employee Trustees, and two external trustees.

== Activities ==
=== Publishing ===
TGBC writes and publishes Bible studies, training and evangelism resources, including Bible reading notes, youth materials and the Christianity Explored range. They distribute in the UK for the Australian evangelical, Reformed publisher Matthias Media. They co-published The Briefing magazine in association with Matthias Media, with whom they had an early association. The Briefing ceased publication in 2007. (As noted above, TGBC was originally called St. Matthias Press UK, while Matthias Media in Australia was called St. Matthias Press and Tapes). They also promote and distribute a number of imprints of other publishers, including Intervarsity-Press UK, Good News Crossway, Evangelical Press, Christian Focus and Anglican Youthworks.

In 2013 it established a new imprint for children's publishing, styled The Good Book for Kids (TGBC4K). It quickly established a best-selling range of illustrated books called Tales that Tell the Truth (T5), written by a variety of authors and illustrated by Colombian artist Catalina Echeverri. One of the titles in the series The One o'Clock Miracle won the Speaking Volumes UK Christian Children's Book of the Year Award in 2016. The Friend who Forgives won the Christianity Today Children's Book of the Year Award in 2019.

=== Mission Outreach ===
As part of the not for profit side of their activities, TGBC provides basic sermon outlines on a number of Bible books, named the Pray Prepare Preach (PPP) series. The Forum of Bible Agencies International states that this is because some pastors and teachers in third-world countries have little Bible training and few resources in their own language.

Aside from direct sales from TGBC, distribution to the Global South includes: UK mission organisations that send out literature to pastors, Organisations and individuals that organise preaching seminars, and Overseas organisations which distribute literature in their own country.

=== Conferences and Training Events ===
TGBC is part of a conservative group (along with London City Mission, All Souls Langham Place and Oak Hill College) that organises the annual Evangelists' Conference. TGBC is also involved in the annual London and Northern Men's and Women's Conferences (and has published the talks, seminars and handbooks from those conferences) for local church ministry. They also ran training events for Youth and Children's work in the UK and Northern Ireland. TGBC co-hosted the Urban Plant Life Conference in November 2008. Since 2016, these events have been outsourced to a separate organisation as part of a business rationalisation which has seen the organisation focus on its publishing activities.

=== The Good Book College and the Moore College Extension Course ===
In 1999, TGBC began administering Moore Theological College extension courses in the UK - an established distance learning course from Sydney, Australia. The Open Bible Institute states that this was consistent with TGBC's desire to build on the training events it had been running. The Open Bible Institute was renamed The Good Book College in 2012.

Over the next five years, enrolments in the Moore College course grew to just under 1,000 students. TGBC set up the Open Bible Institute in 2005/2006, as a distance learning college that could accommodate students of varying levels of competency. The Good Book College offered validated courses to Cert HE level as a UK Academic Partner of Middlesex University and handled Moore College enrolments for students in the UK, Europe and Africa, including students of the Bible Training Partnership. The Programme closed down in 2016 as part of a business refocussing exercise.

=== International Distribution ===
The TGBC USA website began in February 2009, to coincide with the Desiring God Pastor’s Conference. TGBC exhibits at large North American evangelical, reformed conferences, such as Together For the Gospel and Desiring God Pastor’s Conference. The company now maintains a permanent office based in Charlotte, NC, and it employs twelve (12) staff as of May 2023. Trade distribution in the USA is through Anchor Distribution. Trade distribution is performed in Australia by Reformers Bookshop, who also perform order-fulfilment for the TGBC Australian website. Canadian distribution is managed through Parasource. In 2019 TGBC opened an Indian Website as part of its desire to develop International distribution, and has established a trade relationship with startup internet bookseller For the Truth India. Distribution in South Africa is through Christian Book Discounters, based in Cape Town.

=== Authors ===
TGBC publishes works by a number of prominent evangelical leaders in the UK, the USA and Australia, including Tim Keller (pastor), Albert Mohler, Alistair Begg, Matt Chandler (pastor), Vaughan Roberts, Rico Tice, John Lennox and Phillip Jensen.

== See also ==
- Christianity Explored
- Matthias Media
- Reformers Bookshop
- The Briefing
