= Rico Tice =

English writer (born 1966)

- Born: Richard Ian Tice; 3 June 1966 (age 60); Chile
- Education: Sherborne School; Bristol University; Wycliffe Hall, Oxford

Ecclesiastical career
- Church: Church of England
- Ordained: 1994
- Writings: Christianity Explored
- Congregations: All Souls, Langham Place (1994–2024)
- Offices held: Associate minister

Richard Ian "Rico" Tice (born 3 June 1966) is a Christian minister and evangelist, who was, until 2024, an Anglican clergyman. He is also a writer, co-author of Christianity Explored. He was associate minister at All Souls Church, Langham Place, London, and is well known in the UK as a speaker at conservative evangelical Christian conferences.

== Early life ==
Born in Chile in 1966, the son of a businessman and a nurse, Tice grew up in Uganda and Zaire. He was educated at Sherborne School, Dorset and spent a gap year working as a youth worker in inner-city Liverpool. He then studied history at Bristol University, where he also captained the rugby team.

His progress towards full-time Christian ministry began with a period as a lay assistant at Christ Church Clifton in Bristol. After working briefly for Hewlett Packard, he trained for ordination at Wycliffe Hall, Oxford.

== Christian ministry ==
Tice was ordained in the Church of England as a deacon in 1994 and as a priest in 1995. In 1994, he joined the ministry staff of All Souls, Langham Place in the Diocese of London, serving his curacy and then as an associate minister. His main role is to help the hundreds of enquirers about the Christian faith who come through the doors of the church each year. In an interview in 2000 he confirmed his desire to focus on evangelism.

He co-wrote Christianity Explored with Barry Cooper; this is a widely used range of resources for people enquiring about the Christian faith. He also presents the associated videos.

In 2003, 2009 and 2013, Tice led the OICCU mission at Oxford University. He is a non-executive director of Christians in Sport. Tice has written a number of books in collaboration with co-authors, many of them published by The Good Book Company. His First book, "Honest Evangelism: How to talk about Jesus even when it's tough", was published in 2015. His book Faithful Leaders and the things that matter most was published in 2021 is a response to a series of scandals about leadership failure in the evangelical church.

In 2023, Tice left All Souls and was granted permission to officiate in the Diocese of London. In 2024, he left the Church of England over same-sex services of blessing and started worshipping at an International Presbyterian Church congregation.

== Personal life ==
Tice was married at All Souls, Langham Place, London on 20 December 2008.

He lists his hobbies as rugby, golf and films.

== Bibliography ==
In addition to his work on Christianity Explored Tice has published a number of books on evangelism, and other books aimed at explaining the Christian faith for those investigating it. Books include:

- "Honest Evangelism: how to talk about Jesus even when it's tough", co-written with Carl Laferton
- A Very Different Christmas, co-written with Nate-Morgan Locke
- Capturing God, a book that explores the Easter message
- Faithful Leaders and the things that matter most, The Good Book Company (2021) ISBN 978-1-78498-580-6
