= Barry Cooper (author) =

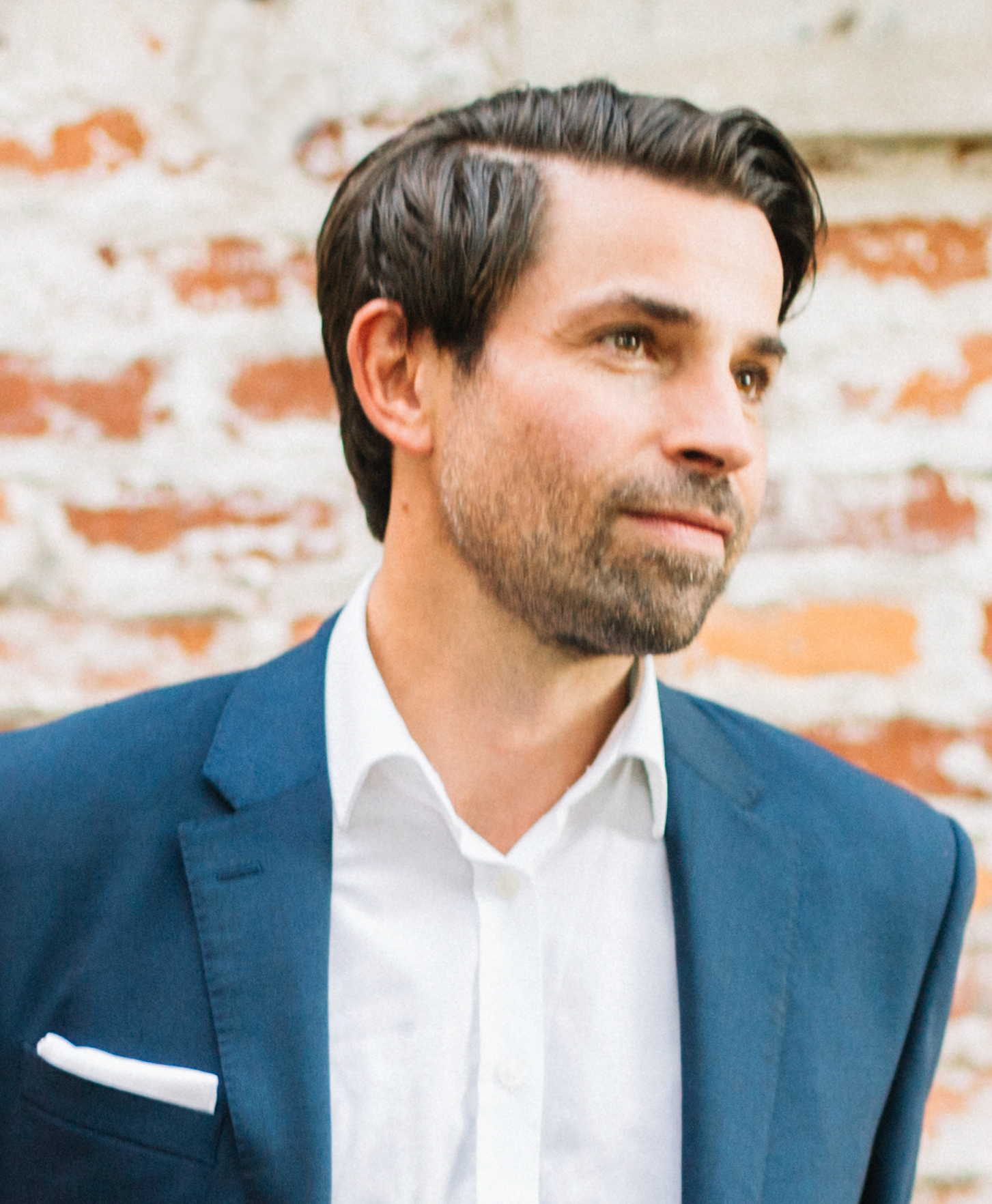
Cooper in 2016

Barry Cooper is a British pastor and writer. He is a senior pastor at Christ Community Church in Florida.

Cooper was born in Epsom, Surrey. He received a master's degree in English language and literature from St Catherine's College, Oxford and later received a master's degree in Christian studies from Trinity Evangelical Divinity School in Chicago.

Alongside Rico Tice, Cooper created Christianity Explored, a Christian teaching course.

Cooper has authored and co-authored several books, including One Life, If You Could Ask God One Question and Can I Really Trust The Bible?; he has also contributed to Christianity Today, Desiring God, The Gospel Coalition, 9Marks, and ExploreGod.

Cooper is the producer, writer and presenter of the Simply Put podcast, co-writer and presenter of the Luther: In Real Time podcast, and co-producer/presenter of Cooper & Cary Have Words. Luther: In Real Time received the National Religious Broadcasters' Best Original Podcast Award for 2023.

Cooper is married to Lee and they live in Florida.

== Publications ==
Cooper's publications include:

- Christianity Explored (with Rico Tice)
- One Life (with Rico Tice)
- Can I Really Trust the Bible?
- If You Could Ask God One Question
- Discipleship Explored - Study Guide
