= Matthias Media =

Australian evangelical Christian publisher

- Founder: Phillip Jensen
- Country of origin: Australia
- Headquarters location: Sydney, New South Wales
- Publication types: Magazines, books, tracts, audiobooks
- Nonfiction topics: Christianity
- Official website: www.matthiasmedia.com.au

Matthias Media is an Australian evangelical Christian publisher. The business was founded in 1988, and grew out of the ministry of Phillip Jensen and editor Tony Payne at St Matthias, Centennial Park, Sydney under the name St Matthias Press and Tapes. Many resources now published by Matthias Media were developed as part of the ministry of Campus Bible Study at the University of New South Wales. Since then the company has grown under the banner "Resources for growing Christians" and is now incorporated as a non-profit company under the name Matthias Media. By 2001 it was the largest evangelical publisher in Australia with over 100 books published.

Distribution in the UK is through an independent partner organisation (The Good Book Company) and in recent years a US office has been opened (Matthias Media (USA)).

Beginning with The Briefing (a (now) monthly news and resource magazine for evangelical Christians), Two Ways to Live (an evangelistic tract developed by Phillip Jensen), and the pre-existing St Matthias sermon tape ministry, the company now publishes a range of bible studies, training courses, devotional guides, book and sermon CDs. The evangelistic materials focus on worldview in living as a Christian. Two Ways to Live and its sister publication Just for Starters were the official training resources for the Australian arms of the 1995 Billy Graham Global Mission.

The company is dedicated to publishing books and other resources such as training programs, tracts and Bible studies, and accept submissions for publishing resources where they relate to the growth of a gospel ministry, have content that is loyal to the Bible, and has a quality that is of a high standard.

== Australian Christian Book of the Year Awards ==
- 2020 Shortlisted: Where to Start with Islam by Samuel Green ISBN 978-1-925424-60-7
- 2010 2nd Prize: The Trellis and the Vine by Colin Marshall and Tony Payne ISBN 978-1-921441-58-5
- 2005 2nd Prize: Beyond Greed by Brian Rosner (ISBN 1-87-632676-X)
- 2004 Winner: Stirrings of the Soul by Michael Raiter (ISBN 1-87-632662-X)
- 2004 Highly Commended: Going the Distance: How to Stay Fit for A Lifetime of Ministry by Peter Brain (ISBN 1-87-632673-5)
- 2003 Winner: Islam in our Backyard by Tony Payne (ISBN 1-87-632648-4)
- 2002 Winner: What Some of You Were Edited by Christopher Keane (ISBN 1-87-632641-7)
- 2002 Certificate of Commendation: If I were God, I'd End All the Pain by John Dickson (ISBN 1-87-632637-9)
- 2001 Highly Commended: The Essence of Feminism by Kirsten Birkett (ISBN 1-87-632625-5)
- 2000 Joint Winner: Simply Christianity: Beyond Religion by John Dickson (ISBN 1-90-488923-9)
- 1998 Highly Commended: Unnatural Enemies by Kirsten Birkett (ISBN 1-87-632601-8)
