= Evangelical Press =

UK non-profit publisher

- Founded: 1967
- Country of origin: United Kingdom
- Headquarters location: Welwyn Garden City
- Publication types: Books
- Nonfiction topics: Christianity
- Official website: epbooks.org

Evangelical Press (also known as 'EP Books') is a small Christian not-for-profit publisher of books, including two commentary series and a range of non-fiction aimed at the ordinary reader. In 2022, 10Publishing acquired the publishing rights of EP, and today is continuing to grow the publishing range of EP. Distribution in the US is provided by 10ofThose USA, based in Louisville, Kentucky. It serves a Reformed conservative evangelical constituency.

EP's best-selling authors include John Blanchard, Dane Ortlund, Faith Cook, Sharon James, JC Ryle and many others. John Blanchard's booklet Ultimate Questions has now printed in excess of eighteen million copies and is translated into over fifty languages, and is also online. EP also publishes the popular Welwyn Commentary series, helpful for preachers but intended to reach ordinary readers as well. In 2018 this series completed a revision and redesign. In late 2023, the whole Bible was covered by the commentary series, with the publication of John.

== History ==
EP was founded by a Memorandum and Articles of Association incorporated 12 October 1967.

== Activities ==
EP has published and distributed several thousand titles from hundreds of authors. Subjects include Bible commentaries, devotionals, biographies, classics, music, and family books.

EP works co-operatively with Bryntirion Press, producing books on their behalf for wide distribution and occasionally for limited distribution in Wales. EP's books are now distributed by Tenofthose in the UK and US.

EPMT, now an independent trust, has hosted pastors' conferences in Belarus, Russia, Romania and across Africa.

Most books are in English, but some are available also in French, Spanish, Russian, and other languages.

== Evangelical Times ==
Evangelical Press co-operated in the publishing of Evangelical Times until 2015. This is a monthly newspaper which was established in 1967.
