= Archibald Morton =

Anglican dean (1911–1973)

Archibald Wentworth Morton (7 May 1911, Hamilton, New Zealand – 27 Feb 1973, Sydney, Australia) was the 7th Dean of Sydney, Australia, in office from 3 March 1967 until his death 1973.

He was educated at the University of Auckland and ordained in 1938. His first posts were curacies in Sydney. Following wartime service with the RAAF he began a lecture tour of Europe and the USA that lasted from 1946 to 1951. He was rector of Haberfield, New South Wales, then Darlinghurst until his installation as Dean. He was chairman of the St Andrew's Cathedral School school council.

Religious titles
Preceded by Francis Oag Hulme-Moir	Dean of Sydney; 1967–1973	Succeeded by Lancelot Rupert Shilton
