= Albert Talbot =

Australian dean

Albert Edward Talbot (18 August 1877 – 8 July 1936) was Dean of Sydney from 1912 until his death.

Talbot by David Low

He was educated at Manchester Grammar School and Emmanuel College, Cambridge and ordained in 1905. His first post was as a curate at Whalley Range. Then he was a Lecturer at the Church Mission College in Islington. His final appointment before leaving for Australia was at Rector of Stowell Memorial Church, Weaste.

Church of Ireland titles
Preceded by Post vacant	Dean of Sydney; 1912–1936	Succeeded by Stuart Barton Babbage
