= Sandy Grant =

Sandy Grant is an Australian Anglican minister, who has been Dean of St Andrew's Cathedral, Sydney since 9 December 2021. Prior to that, he was Senior Minister of St Michael's Cathedral, Wollongong from 2004 to 2021.

Grant was previously Chair of the Sydney Anglican Domestic Violence Task Force. He studied at Moore Theological College.

Grant is an advocate of poker machine reform.

Anglican Communion titles
Preceded by Kanishka Raffel	Dean of Sydney; 2021–present	Incumbent
