= Murder of Lilie James =

2023 school murder in Sydney, Australia

- Location: St Andrew's Cathedral School, Sydney, New South Wales, Australia
- Date: 25 October 2023; 3 years ago
- Attack type: Murder, bludgeoning, beating
- Victim: Lilie James (aged 21)
- Accused: Paul Thijssen (died 2023, aged 24)

Lilie James (21 May 2002 – 25 October 2023) was a student and water polo coach from Sans Souci, New South Wales, who was found murdered at St Andrew's Cathedral School in Sydney CBD. She was last seen alive at around 7 p.m. on 25 October 2023, entering the gymnasium toilet with a man following behind. Her body was discovered by police before midnight that day. According to advocacy group Counting Dead Women Australia, James was the 46th woman to be murdered in Australia in 2023.

On 26 October 2023, police began investigations, initially at St Andrew's where they identified Lilie James as a victim of homicide. Paul Thijssen was later identified and named a prime suspect after reportedly disappearing. Thijssen was last seen at Diamond Bay in Vaucluse, New South Wales, where he died by suicide. His body was found and identified on 27 October 2023 by police.

== Background and murder ==
Lilie James was born in May 2002 to Jamie and Peta James and resided in Sans Souci, New South Wales. She graduated in 2020 at Danebank, in Hurstville, and studied sports business at the University of Technology Sydney the following year. She began dating Paul Thijssen, a former student of the school who was working as a sports coach, five weeks prior to her death. Close friends of James described her as "the nicest and kindest person".

Thijssen was born in the Netherlands as an only child and attended St Andrew's as a student from 2015 to 2017, where he was a sports captain and part of the school leadership team. He was hired as a sports assistant coach by the school the following year before completing his degree at a university in the Netherlands. Thijssen returned to Australia in 2020 to continue work at St Andrew's as a cricket and hockey coach and an after-hours coordinator. He was also listed as the hockey coach at St Vincent's College in Potts Point. Both James and Thijssen had no previous domestic violence-related issues or apprehended violence orders.

On 25 October 2023 at approximately 7 p.m., James went into the school's gymnasium toilet before CCTV captured Thijssen following behind her. The two had split just days prior. About an hour later, Thijssen left the toilet without James and arrived at Diamond Bay Reserve at 8:47 p.m., where he disposed of a hammer in a bin. Thijssen left the location at 9:49 p.m. before calling the police two hours later, informing them of a body at St Andrew's that needed to be investigated. Thijssen's last known location was at The Gap in Vaucluse, New South Wales, where he left a backpack with his personal belongings.

== Investigation ==
=== First crime scene ===
A woman's body was found by police, before midnight on 25 October 2023, in the school's gymnasium toilet. Police described the body "as a woman in her early twenties" and concluded her cause of death to be homicide. Police also reported "serious head injuries" found on the body, leading her to be unrecognisable when discovered. The search for Thijssen, although not identified at this point, began as police believed he could assist with the investigation. At approximately 4:30 a.m. on 26 October 2023, St Andrew’s sent an email to all students' parents, stating that the school would be closed for the rest of the week due to a "critical incident". A second text message was sent at 6:30 a.m. to assure parents that no students were involved in the incident. The school brought in counsellors to provide professional support to both students and parents. Students taking their Higher School Certificate and final year International Baccalaureate exams were relocated to separate buildings. At around 10:35 to 10:40 a.m., the woman's body was confirmed to be James by a friend of her family. Thijssen was identified by police at 11:40 a.m.

On 30 October 2023, reports emerged that Thijssen sent a text message to James' father using her phone, asking him to pick her up from the school. Criminologist Xanthe Mallett speculated that the killer's motive for sending those texts was either to ensure that James' body would be found or to potentially alter the time at which the police believed she had died. Criminal psychologist Tim Watson-Munro speculated that the murder was premeditated after it was revealed that Thijssen travelled to a hardware store for a hammer and rented a car on the day of the murder; he drove the same car to school. Watson-Munro added that Thijssen was fully aware and "had a clear intention."

=== Second crime scene ===
On 26 October 2023 at around 1 a.m., a second crime scene was established, 11 km away from the initial scene, at the Gap in Vaucluse where the last sighting of Thijssen was reported. Police also found "property associated with the homicide" located in the same proximity. After his disappearance, police began investigating if Thijssen had killed himself after the crime and was labelled as a prime suspect. At 9 a.m., police helicopters and boats arrived at Vaucluse to conduct line searches across South Head Reserve while police patrolled the coastline. The area around the cliff edge at Diamond Bay was cordoned off and a bin was also sealed off with a police rescue tent set up nearby. At 5 p.m., a backpack with Thijssen's personal belongings, including a hammer, was found. Police concluded the hammer was the weapon used to inflict harm to James's head.

Police returned to the scene with ambulances at 8 a.m. on 27 October 2023. A body was spotted on the rocks beneath Diamond Bay Reserve by a group of tradesmen, who were working nearby on a construction site at the top of the cliff. Police were notified and a rescue team was organised to retrieve the body. At 12:15 p.m., the body was retrieved by a rescue and bomb disposal unit, marine unit and Westpac Rescue helicopter. The body was reported to be male and was transported at 3:30 p.m. from a blue forensics tent. The male was identified to be Paul Thijssen after fingerprints were used and cross-referenced with prints from Netherlands embassy to confirm. Police also confirmed that Thijssen arrived at the location at 10 p.m. after the murder, but it remains unknown what he did for two hours before contacting emergency services at around 11 p.m.

=== Inquest ===
An inquest into the deaths of James and Thijssen began on 18 March 2025.

== Tributes and aftermath ==
The first statement by Lilie James's family was released on 27 October 2023, stating: "She was vibrant, outgoing, and very much loved by her family and friends. We are tremendously grateful for the support of our community at this difficult time. As a police investigation is underway, we will not be providing further comments." Friends and students who knew James posted on social media, expressing their condolences to her family. A video also stood on St Andrew's website, displaying James performing a monologue of Macbeth as part of her HSC drama major work. Flowers were placed at a makeshift memorial in front of the school and James's home as a tribute to James's passing.

A letter by St Andrew's principal was sent to all parents, saying that police had assured her that the killing was unforeseeable and vowed not to let the "horrors of evil" define the school community. Notes from some of James’s closest colleagues were released as a memoir of James. As a result of the incident, the gymnasium was restricted to students and the school's library was turned into a drop-in counselling centre. Assessments were either postponed or cancelled with students eligible for special consideration before exams. The toilet block of the gymnasium was planned to be demolished on 3 November 2023.

A candlelight vigil was held for James in Sans Souci (where she was raised) on 28 October 2023, with members of the community, including close friends and family, attending. St Andrew's also held a special assembly for students and staff on 30 October 2023. A GoFundMe was launched by a close friend in support of James's family. James's funeral was held at Danebank, her former school, on 17 November.

Thijssen's parents will have his body cremated and scatter his ashes in Sydney rather than the repatriation of his body to the Netherlands.

The murder of Lilie James was the subject of a 60 Minutes story on 27 October 2024.

=== Use of artificial intelligence ===
James’ death became the subject of controversy over the use of generative artificial intelligence. A poll included by Microsoft Start on a Guardian article asked readers whether they thought James had died by murder, suicide or accident. The poll was widely condemned for being in poor taste and some critics mistakenly believed The Guardian’s staff had written it. The incident led to calls for Microsoft to limit its use of generative AI in news-related contexts.
