= St Andrew's Cathedral, Sydney =

- Cathedral Church of Andrew the Apostle
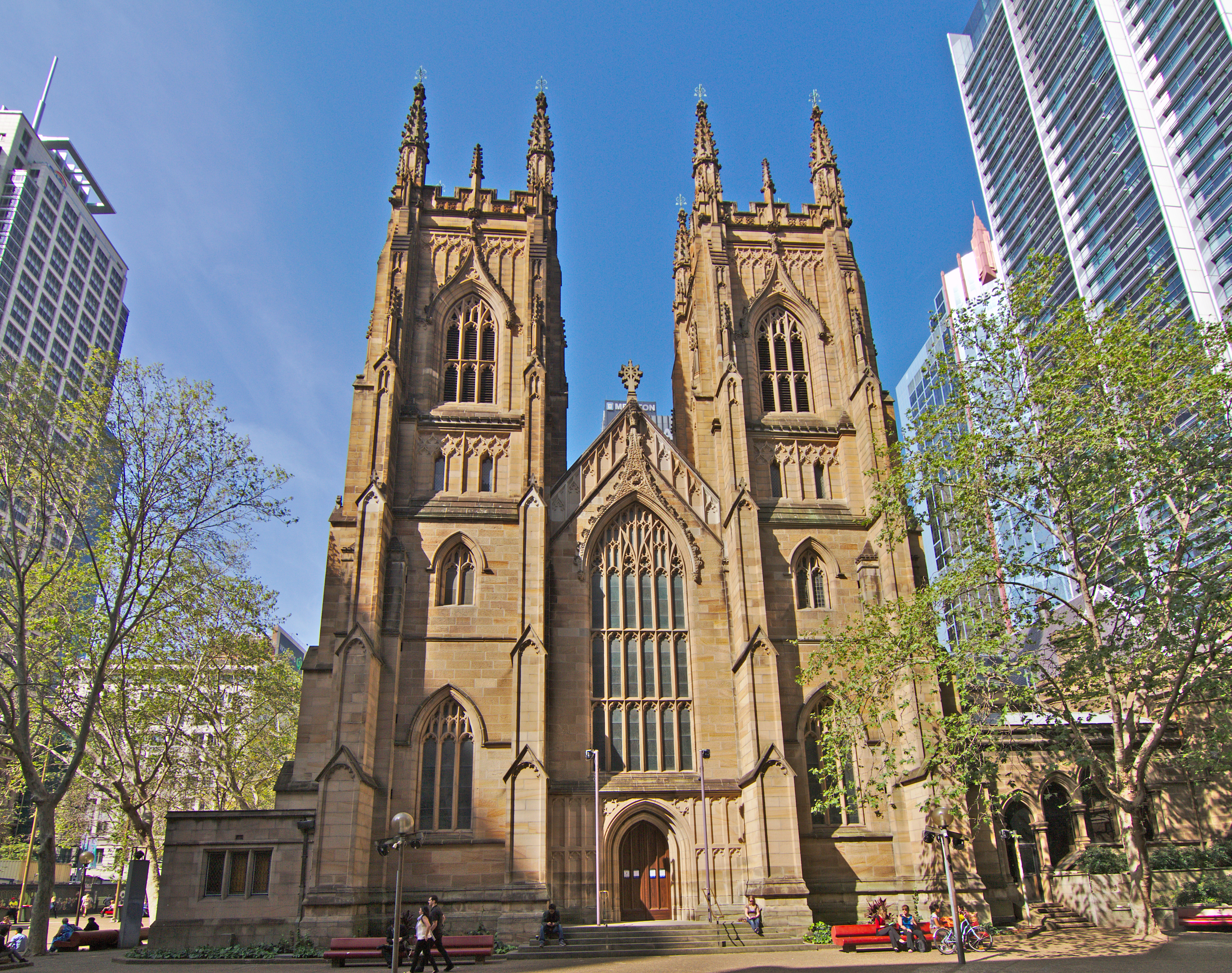
- West front
- St Andrew's Cathedral, Sydney
- 33°52′26″S 151°12′23″E
- Location: George Street, Sydney CBD, New South Wales
- Country: Australia
- Denomination: Anglican
- Churchmanship: Low church evangelical
- Website: sydneycathedral.com

History
- Status: Cathedral
- Founded: 31 August 1819; 1837
- Founders: Governor Lachlan Macquarie; Bishop William Broughton
- Dedication: Andrew the Apostle
- Consecrated: 30 November 1868 by Bishop Frederic Barker

Architecture
- Functional status: Complete
- Architects: Francis Greenway (1819); James Hume (1837); Edmund Blacket (1842)
- Architectural type: Cathedral
- Style: Gothic Revival
- Groundbreaking: 1837
- Completed: 1868

Specifications
- Length: 48 metres (157 ft)
- Width: 17.6 metres (58 ft)
- Height: 29.7 metres (97 ft)

Administration
- Province: New South Wales
- Diocese: Sydney

Clergy
- Archbishop: Kanishka Raffel
- Dean: Sandy Grant

New South Wales Heritage Register
- Official name: St Andrew's Anglican Cathedral and Chapter House
- Type: State heritage (complex / group)
- Criteria: a., b., c., d., e., f., g.
- Designated: 3 September 2004
- Reference no.: 1708
- Type: Cathedral
- Category: Religion

New South Wales Heritage Database (Local Government Register)
- Official name: St Andrew's Cathedral Group Including Interiors, Courtyard Spaces and Forecourts
- Type: Local government heritage (complex / group)
- Criteria: a., c., d., f.
- Designated: 14 December 2012
- Reference no.: I1793
- Type: Built
- Category: Cathedral

St Andrew's Cathedral (also known as St Andrew's Anglican Cathedral) is a cathedral church of the Anglican Diocese of Sydney in the Anglican Church of Australia. The cathedral is the seat of the Anglican Archbishop of Sydney and Metropolitan of New South Wales (currently the Most Reverend Kanishka Raffel from 28 May 2021). The position of Dean of Sydney has been held by the Very Reverend Sandy Grant since 9 December 2021.

The St Andrew's has an Evangelical ministry, holding services every day, including a weekly healing service. There is a cathedral choir of men and boys who sing during term time, as well as a company of bell ringers. The notable pipe organ has been restored and is regularly used for recitals and concerts.

Designed primarily by Edmund Blacket on foundations laid by James Hume, the cathedral was built from 1837 to 1868, and was ready for services and consecrated in 1868, making it the oldest cathedral in Australia.

St Andrew's is one of the city's finest examples of Gothic Revival architecture. Joan Kerr described the cathedral as "a perfect example of the colonial desire to reproduce England in Australia in the mid nineteenth century".

The cathedral is located at 1400 George Street in the Sydney central business district of the City of Sydney local government area of New South Wales. St Andrew's is owned by the Anglican Church Property Trust. It was added to the New South Wales State Heritage Register on 3 September 2004; is listed on the City of Sydney local government heritage register; and is listed on the (now defunct) Register of the National Estate.

== History ==
=== Early construction 1811-c. 1874 ===
==== Macquarie and Greenway ====
A cathedral was planned by Governor Lachlan Macquarie to be an impressive building in the centre of Sydney within a large square which would contain major civic buildings. He foresaw that Sydney would grow into a large city requiring a large cathedral. With the architect Francis Greenway, who had been transported to Sydney for forgery, Macquarie planned a church 61-metre (200 ft) square and probably with the seating and galleries facing inward from three sides. The foundation stone was laid with full ceremony on 31 August 1819. Only a few foundations were laid, however, before the plan was abandoned. It was later moved to accommodate development under Governor Bourke to make George Street straight rather than interrupted by a large square. Macquarie's plans were abandoned with the appointment of Commissioner Bigge to the colony and St James' was constructed in place of the proposed cathedral as a church for Sydney.

Macquarie's vision has since been realised with the construction of the present cathedral and later Sydney Town Hall.

==== Broughton and Hume ====
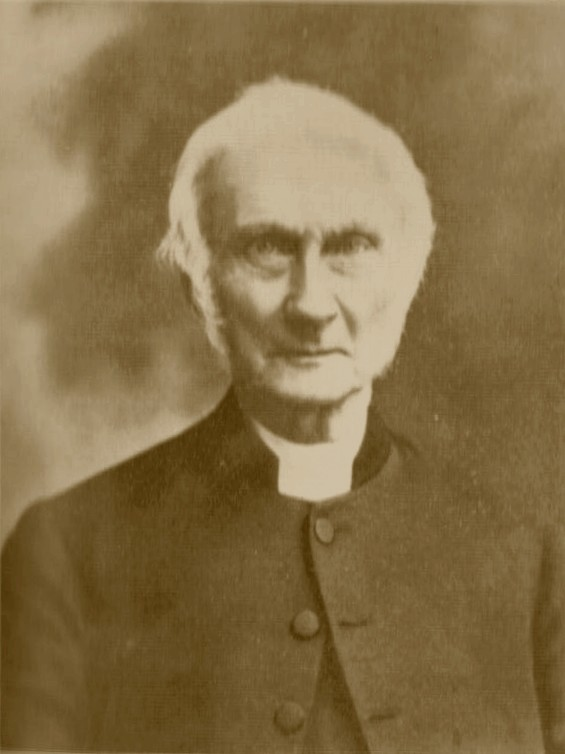
W. M. Cowper, Dean 1858–1902

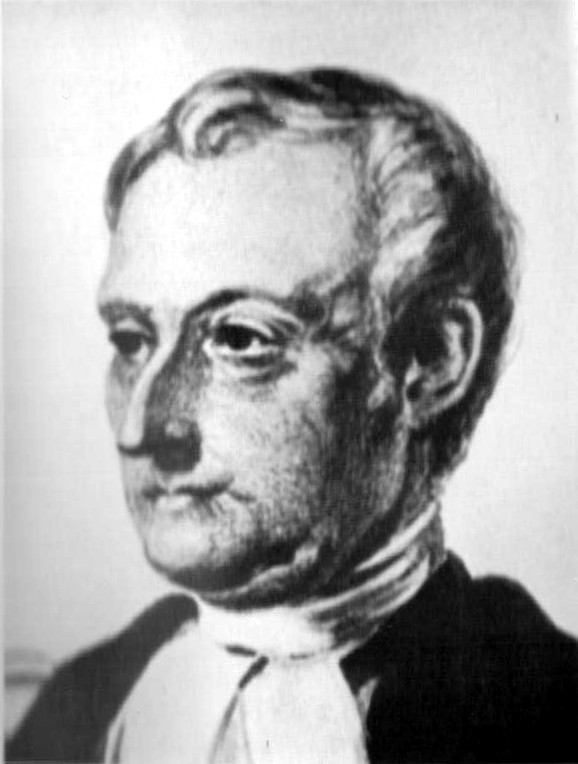
William Grant Broughton, first Bishop of Sydney

Bishop William Grant Broughton, who was consecrated as a bishop in 1836, had a new foundation stone laid in 1837. The plans, prepared by the architect James Hume, were of much more modest proportions and were for a traditional cruciform church in the Gothic style. The designs, dating from the early phase of Gothic Revival architecture, did not show a great expertise in the handling of the particular architectural vocabulary. Only one notable section was completed, the façade of the south transept. However, the foundations were laid and some of the walls were constructed up to a height of about 5 metres (15 ft).

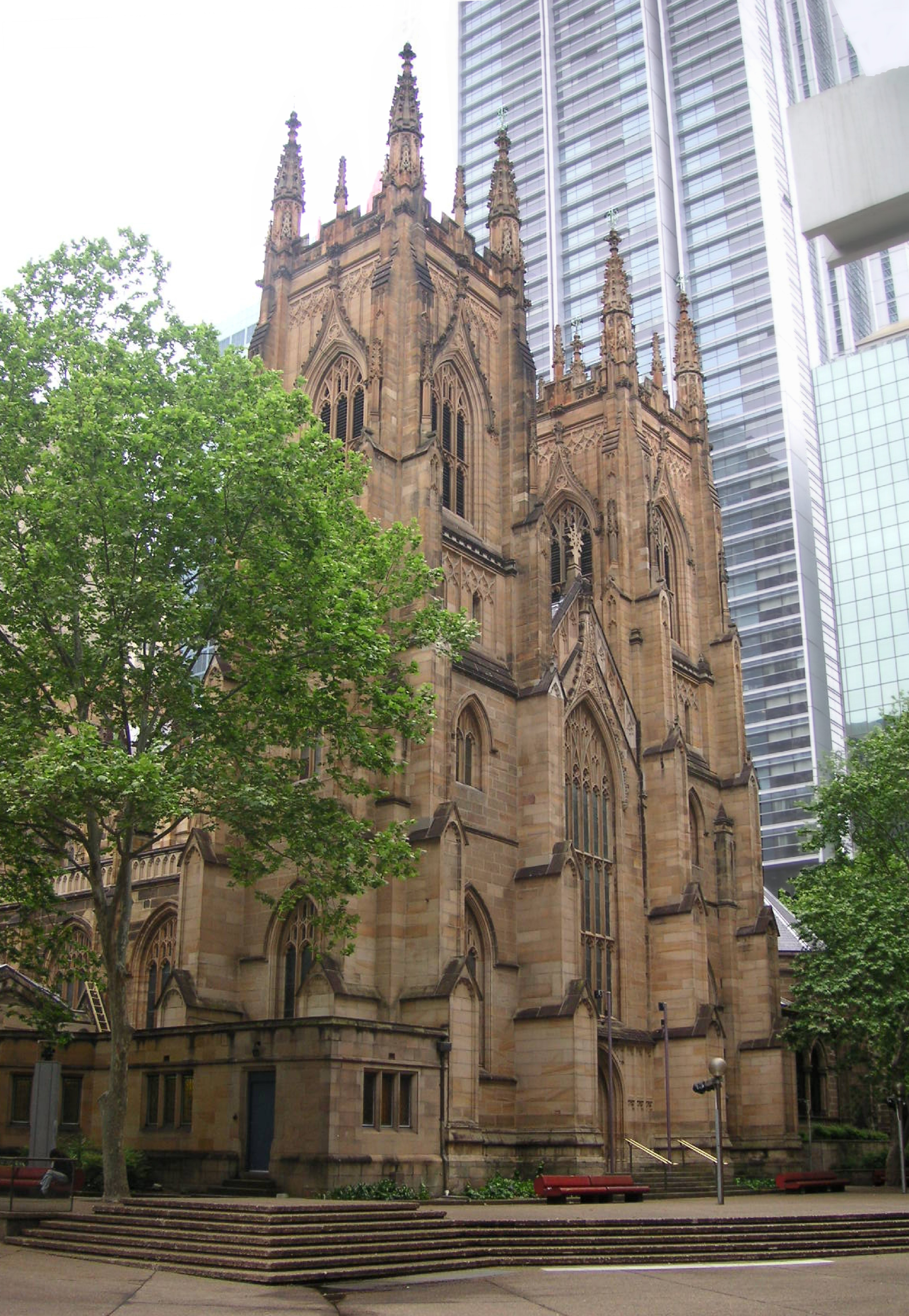
The west front demonstrates Blacket's mastery of Gothic design.

Revival of interest was partly due to the Church Act of 1836 which provided NSW Colonial Government subsidies for new church construction. In this case, £1,000 and finances for a dean was provided. The cathedral was the most prominent of the eight churches commenced under this scheme and the major church building designed by Hume. It was also the first attempt in the colony to produce accurate details from medieval sources. The Conrad Martens lithograph influenced much of the church design that followed. Work on the building again ceased in 1842 due to the combined effects of drought and economic depression in the colony.

==== Edmund Blacket ====
In 1842 Edmund Blacket presented himself to Bishop Broughton with a letter from the Archbishop of Canterbury recommending his talent as an architect and having equal facility in both the Classical and the Gothic styles. He was eventually to become known as the Wren of Sydney, having designed two universities, three cathedrals and 50 or more parish churches as well as banks, offices, bridges, mansions and countless shops, cottages and terraced houses. Blacket became the official Colonial Architect from 1849 to 1854.

Blacket was an inventive and stylish Gothic Revival architect who utilised the forms of English Medieval prototypes reproduced in the books of his architectural library to produce designs which, although archeologically "correct", are often highly original. This was just as well, because the task that he inherited from Hume was not an easy one. It took some convincing to get the bishop to accept his deviations from the original design. The problem was how to make an imposing cathedral on foundations which were only the size of a large English parish church. Taking into account what Hume had done and the fact that some of Hume's rather amateurish window tracery was already in place, Blacket designed the cathedral in the style known as Perpendicular Gothic, used extensively at the cathedrals of Canterbury, Winchester and York.

Blacket enlarged the building by two bays in length and added the central tower. He also proceeded to change the overall form and detailing of the building. In October 1850 six bishops of Australasia met in Sydney for a conference. Someone suggested that as there were six pillars in the nave of the cathedral each should bear the name of one of the bishops. William Grant Broughton, Bishop of Sydney and Metropolitan; George Augustus Selwyn, Bishop of New Zealand; Francis Russell Nixon, Bishop of Tasmania; Augustus Short, Bishop of Adelaide; Charles Perry, Bishop of Melbourne and William Tyrell, Bishop of Newcastle. The pillars were so named. In 1868, Prince Alfred, Duke of Edinburgh (second son of Queen Victoria), attended St Andrew's for an organ recital.

With the repetition of forms and the strongly vertical lines characteristic of Perpendicular Gothic, Blacket succeeded in creating a building with harmonious proportions. The western front with its layered decoration is based loosely on that of York Minster. The projecting rectangular buttresses, which transform by stages into lofty octagonally-sectioned pinnacles, and the complex molding around the portals cast varied shadows in the Australian sunlight. Kinsela describes it as “a grand façade with superb towers...Covered with a profusion of ornanament, blind traceries and tiny attached pinnacles, in a light-hearted yet elegant manner.”

Broughton did not live to consecrate St Andrew's. He died while on a trip to England in 1853 and is buried in Canterbury Cathedral. The second Bishop of Sydney, Frederic Barker, consecrated the completed building on St Andrew's Day, 30 November 1868. Seven out of nine Australian bishops were present at the opening. By 1874 the cathedral was substantially complete, including the western towers. The external form of the building had been finished, the building was furnished and changes had already commenced to the interior. Problems were detected due to water and ventilation which Blacket attended to with varying degrees of success.

=== Development of the cathedral: 1874–1968 ===
Minor work was still taking place to the cathedral building from 1874. Fifteen years after opening, large scale cleaning and maintenance of the fabric and furnishings was required, to which Blacket responded.

Within 10 years of the 1874 completion the question of size was raised. Attendances at services had grown and on special occasions hundreds were turned away. In 1886 Bishop Barry said enlarging the cathedral was a question to face. He suggested the possibility of doubling its size. During 1883 proposals were made for a suitable memorial to Bishop Barker the second Bishop of Sydney. The chapter house was decided on, to be also used as a synod hall. This suggestion was aligned with Barker's advocacy of synodical government. The building was designed by the Blacket Brothers and was opened by Lord Carrington and used for the first time at the general synod in October 1886. In the meantime, St Andrew's Cathedral School was established in 1885 to provide choristers to sing at daily services, a strong tradition that has continued.

During 1884, J. Pearson was commissioned to prepare designs for the reredos. Work was finally completed in November 1888 following delays with approval of design, carving and erection of the reredos.

In 1898 a meeting was held at Government House and a committee formed to clear off a debt of 7,200 pounds on cathedral property. Further changes to the cathedral proceeded up to 1900. Ongoing problems were encountered with the stonework and water damage. In 1903 the choir stalls were relocated to Blacket's original plan. It seems constant maintenance and deterioration of the building reached a point of frustration for Blacket who provided a detailed explanation of how the building weathered and suggested remedies. A maintenance person was not engaged.

A number of minor works were undertaken over almost 10 years then in 1916, the next major change took place. The chapter house and new vestries were completed. From 1924 to 1941 works continued when proposals to relocate or enlarge the building were mooted. A series of actual and proposed land resumptions by the Sydney City Council and New South Wales Government Railways took place in the 1920s and 1930s and discussions took place as to whether the cathedral should be moved to another area of the city. In 1935 the St Andrew's Cathedral Site Act fixed the cathedral site to the land between Kent, George and Bathurst streets and the town hall, providing security of tenure. The St Andrew's place subcommittee was formed to recommend treatment of the newly acquired space. In 1937 a competition was launched for proposals to increase the size of the cathedral to seat 2000 to 3000 people. Thirty designs were entered and first place was awarded to R. A. P. Pickney and A. F. E. Gott of London. Much discussion and negotiation took place and some endorsements were made in principle by the St Andrew's building committee. In 1940 the decision was made not to reappoint the building committee and vest its powers in the standing committee. This committee appointed a sub-committee to report on the issue. In the meantime war had broken out and extensions to the cathedral were abandoned as were plans for redevelopment of the site. There was some discussion as to rearranging the interior of the cathedral. The most likely explanation for this change was the geographic changes. When the cathedral was built it was central to its population and had its main entrance in "a street of churches". By the 1930s there were fewer living west of Kent Street and the convenient approach for most people was probably the east. In 1941 the cathedral was reoriented. Between 1942 and 1960 emphasis shifted to work on the exterior of the building taking precedence over any other. During World War Two the cathedral was involved with major activities such as the CENEF huts and has had on ongoing social program operating since.

=== Restoration of the cathedral: 1968-present ===
By 1970 a more comprehensive plan addressing maintenance was required as problems had accelerated. The architects Anchor Murray and Woolley were engaged to prepare a report which was presented to the cathedral chapter in February 1972.

A synopsis of the report sets the basis for the work that took place over 15 years. The report addressed the structure, fabric, fixed furnishings and interior elements. Ancher Mortlock and Woolley reported again in 1979. All work was carried out in conjunction with the National Trust and the government architect.

Expenditure on restoration totalled approximately 1.2 million dollars. No further work took place until 1990 when a detailed maintenance study was prepared by Partridge and Davies, architects. This study detailed a long term maintenance program addressing small scale works on a long-term basis rather than large scale projects. Work has since been carried out by craftsmen and tradespeople on the basis of funds available. It is hoped a long term stonework program be developed over the next year which is urgently required.

In 1999 work to the building reversed the orientation and reinstated the surviving Edmund Blacket fitout and removed all of the 20th-century fitout.

The cathedral continues to play a significant role in the community and maintain a role in the ceremonial life of the people of New South Wales, one of the most recent being the state funeral of Charles Perkins, Aboriginal politician and activist and each year several thousand tourists visit. Numerous volunteers offer assistance for activities and administration, including guides who give tours of the cathedral. Increasingly St Andrew's draws its members from the wider metropolitan area. The principal use of the church continues to be for church services - ordinary and special services for the community and organisations and "occasional" services - baptisms, weddings and funerals. The cathedral and chapter house hold a collection of furniture, fixtures, artifacts and memorials that reflect the history of the building and the personalities and some items from churches throughout the world.

The Reverend Boak Jobbins (1947–2012) played a prominent role in St Andrew's Cathedral restoration. He was committed to the project and the stonemasons even carved a likeness of his head into the stonework on the roof.

=== Chapter house ===
The erection of a chapter house was first mooted in 1883 to provide a synod hall in memory of Bishop Barker. Its construction was approved unanimously by the chapter and synod. Cyril Blacket, Edmund Blacket's son, was appointed as architect. The foundation stone was laid on 30 November 1885 and construction completed in 1886. The choice of site was limited, the south west corner of the site being the only vaguely suitable one. Even this was restricted. In 1916 additions enlarging the chapter house were completed by Wiltshire and Day. Calls for further enlargement continued but nothing was done due to the difficulty of the task. The St Andrew's Cathedral Conservation Plan, 1999 by Paul Davies contains further detailed information on the chapter house, external works and structures, additions to the cathedral exterior, internal layout, 1941 reorientation, ventilation, organs, bells, architects and furniture.

== Description ==
St Andrew's Cathedral and its chapter house are sited in the major civic and ceremonial precinct of Sydney and are key elements in the streetscape and townscape.

=== Cathedral building ===
St Andrew's Cathedral is one of the major Gothic buildings of Sydney and even though small in comparison to many cathedrals is well executed showing the hand of architect Blacket. It is a Gothic Revival cathedral in Sydney freestone of the late Colonial and Early Victorian periods. The exterior has weathered to a mellow warm brown colour which adds to the rich texture created by delicate Gothic windows, well-proportioned towers and buttressing and multiplicity of decorated pinnacles. The main roof is slate.

The cathedral has a largely tessellated tile floor with raised timber sections under most pews. The ceilings in the main space of the cathedral are stained and painted timber.

The windows fall into three classes, stained glass with their protective glazing, leaded light windows and plain windows or other miscellaneous windows. The building contains many fine stained glass windows by local stained glass artists including Ashwin and Falconer and Norman Carter.

The cathedral houses a collection of furniture, fixtures and fittings that date from the time of construction, the temporary cathedral and various significant changes. It also houses a large collection of memorials both as furnishings and fittings and in the form of plaques. The stone pulpit was a gift of merchant Robert Towns.

==== Interior ====
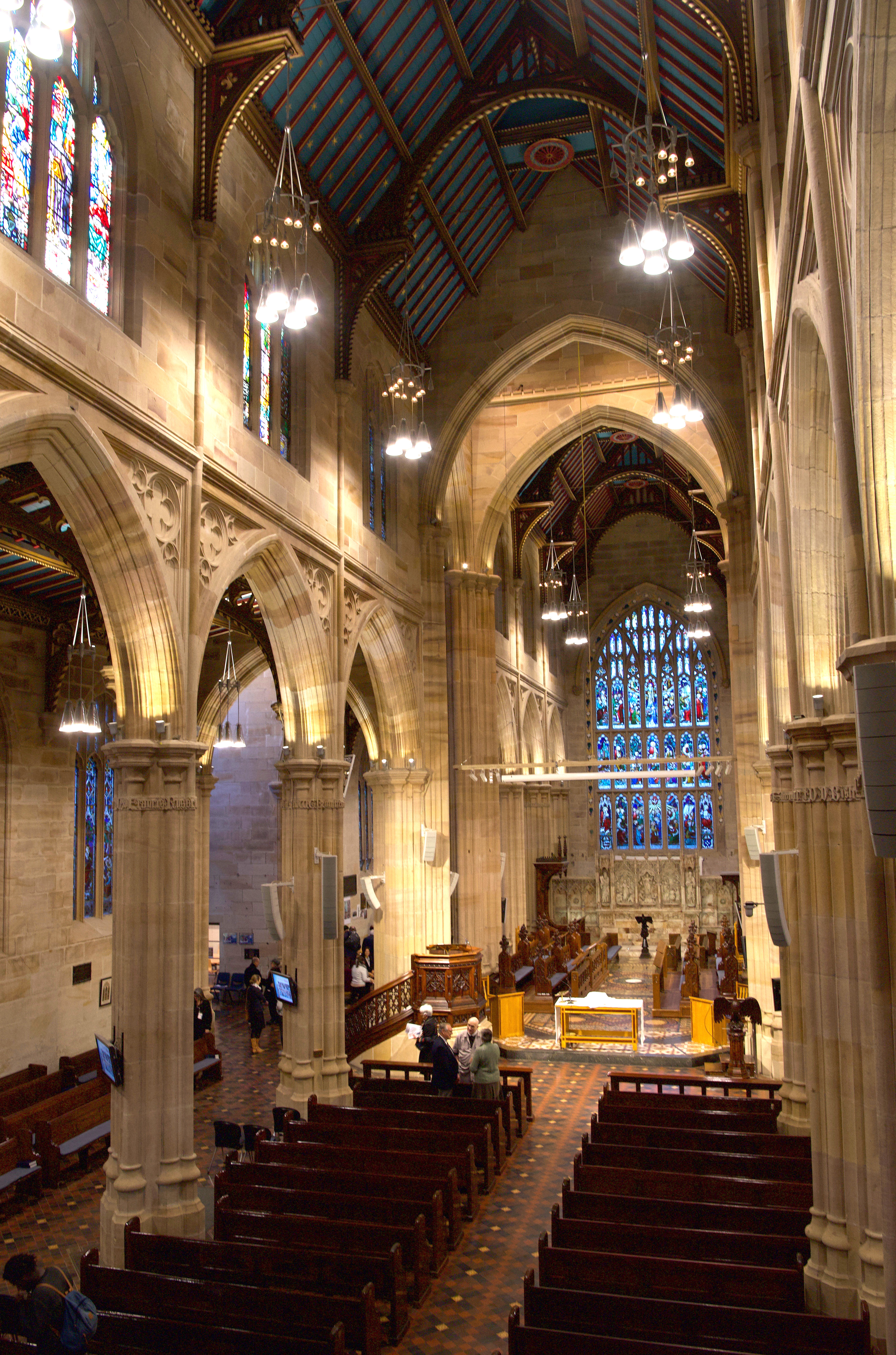
Interior in 2018

The interior is a harmonious composition in Perpendicular Gothic. Although the building is small, it is given a sense of grandeur by the proportions of the arcade and clerestory, the richness of the moldings, the loftiness of the hammerbeam roof with its blue and vermillion decoration, and the decorative details, which include carved stone ribbons around the nave piers, bearing the names of notables in the early Sydney church.

The stone used throughout is Sydney sandstone. The chancel has a newly restored floor in ornate pattern set with marble and intaglio tiles in the Cosmati style by Fields of London, created under the direction of Gilbert Scott. The rest of the building is paved with encaustic tiles of red and black with small intaglio designs by Mintons of Stoke-on-Trent.

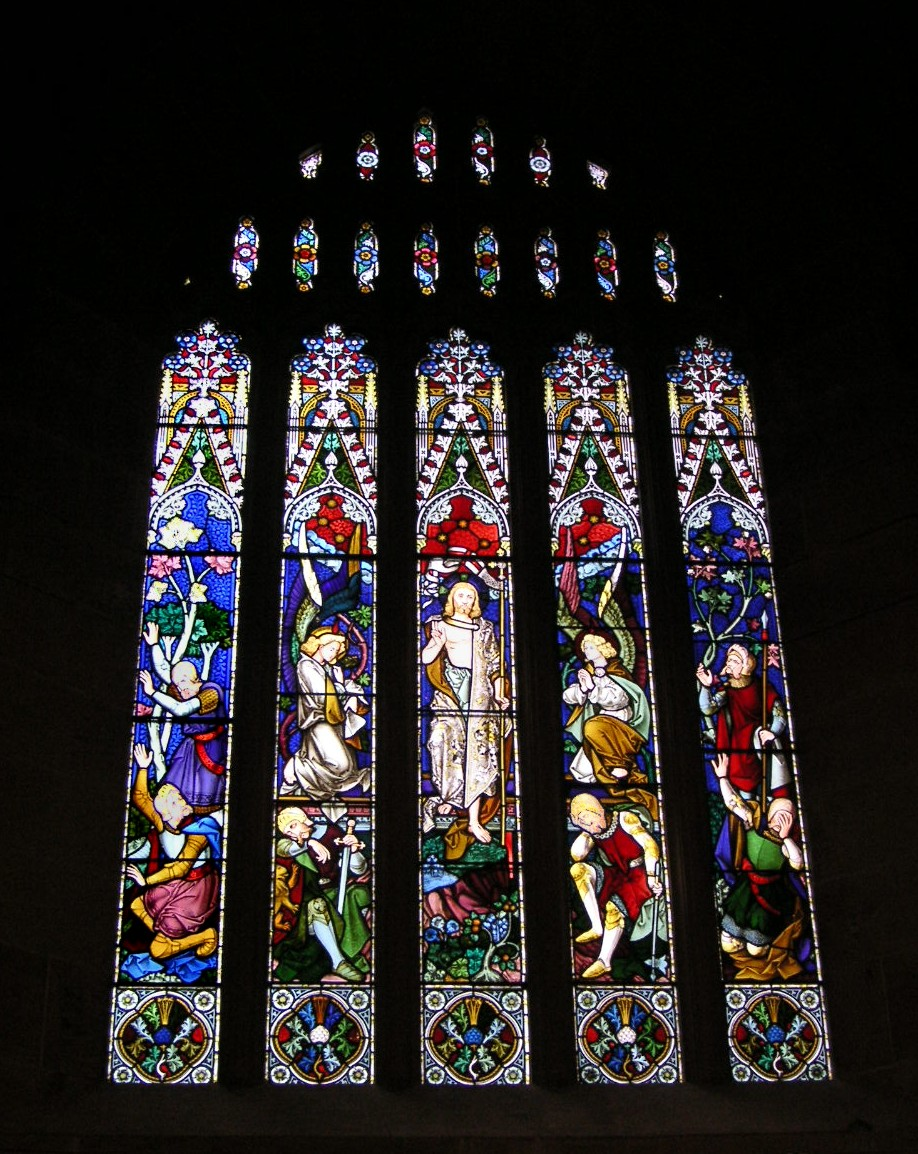
The Resurrection One of the series of 27 windows witnessing the life and teachings of Jesus, by Hardman & Co. of Birmingham

.

The reredos was commissioned by the third Bishop of Sydney, Bishop Barry, and carved of translucent cream English alabaster by the sculptor Thomas Earp, under the supervision of the well-known Gothic Revival architect J. L. Pearson in 1886. The subject matter of the three pictorial panels, as originally created, were: at the centre, the Crucifixion; to the left, the Resurrection; to the right, the Ascension. To either side were the figures of Moses and Elijah. In 1887 there was objection at synod to the representational nature of the reredos and in particular to the central Crucifixion on the grounds that it might be seen as idolatrous. The Crucifixion was replaced, at the expense of the objectors, by the present scene of the Transfiguration. Both depictions of Moses, like the famous sculpture by Michelangelo in San Pietro in Vincoli, Rome show him with horns, a symbolic attribute due to a mistranslation in the Vulgate Bible.

The original furniture of the chancel, of which most remains, is of different dates, but for the most part in the Gothic style. The original choir stalls, of dark English oak, are particularly fine, having large poppy heads, each richly carved with a different foliate design. These were removed under Dean Phillip Jensen, but were reinstated following his departure.

==== Windows ====
The lower stained-glass windows are one of the earliest complete cycles of glass by Hardman of Birmingham and demonstrate the skilful employment of primary colour, elegant design and narrational intelligence that is typical of the work of John Hardman Powell. They represent the life and the parables of Jesus.

The seven-light and four-tiered east window is a complex composition showing scenes in the life of Christ at which the Apostle Andrew was present, such as the Feeding of the Five Thousand. The west window has tiers of apostles.

==== Orientation and reorientation ====
St Andrew's Cathedral is built to the cruciform shape traditional of Christian churches and symbolic of the faith. The body of the cathedral, or nave, with lower aisles on either side, is crossed by the transept, forming a chancel for the seating of clergy and choir at the eastern end. The sides of the choir are traditionally known as cantoris, the side of the precentor, or cantor, and decani, the side of the dean, the senior clerical appointee within the cathedral. See Cathedral architecture and Cathedral diagram.

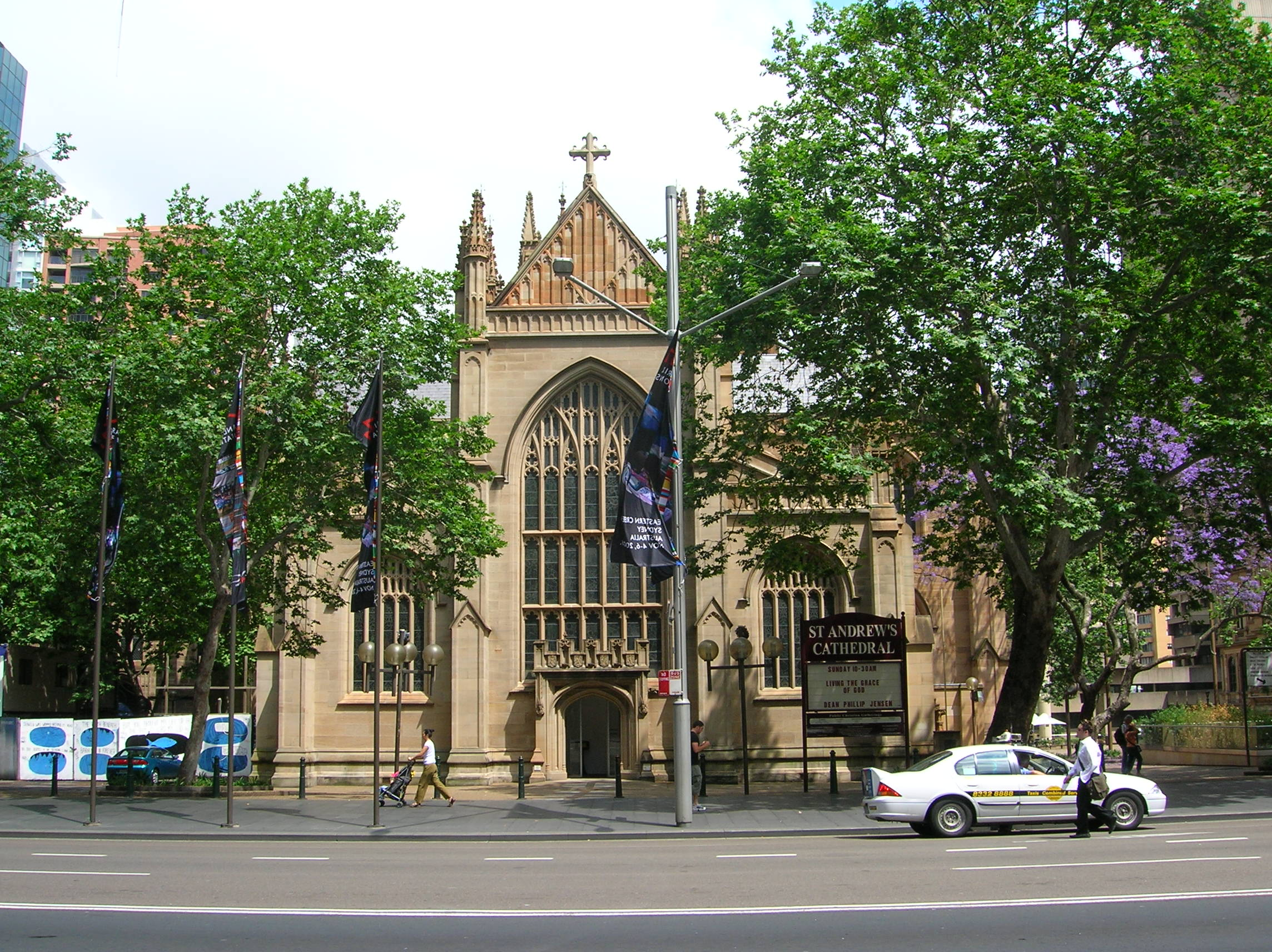
The East End, with the entrance made in 1941

It is customary for cathedrals to be orientated on an east–west axis with the main door to the west and the sanctuary to the east. St Andrew's conformed to that tradition. But a major thoroughfare, George Street, runs by the eastern rather than the western end, making the main entrance less accessible. It also meant that when an electric tram system was installed in the street, the noise frequently drowned out the service of Holy Communion.

In 1941 the interior was therefore reoriented. A new raised chancel floor was built in the west end, the west door was permanently closed and the reredos was placed immediately in front of it. All the internal fittings of the chancel were relocated, the positioning of the reredos right against the wall creating some extra space. There was a claim that the acoustics were improved but this is spurious. While, on one hand, the trams would not have seemed so loud, being more remote, the negative effects on the internal acoustics were significant and a very large number of choristers were employed to make themselves heard.

In 1999–2000 major conservation and restoration work was undertaken to restore the original internal layout, whereby the sanctuary was relocated at the cathedral's eastern end. This was achieved under deanship of the Very Reverend Boak Jobbins. As part of the reorientation and conservation, the Whitely organ was removed from the north transept gallery, thus revealing one of the larger of Hardman's windows including, notably and somewhat controversially, the Crucifixion, the only depiction in the entire cathedral, together with the crucifixions of the saints Andrew and Peter.

=== Changes ===
To avoid any potential confusion of the communion table with an altar, the strongly Evangelical diocesan leadership decided that the communion table should be placed in a more forward position in the chancel and that it should be easily portable in order that it might be removed when not required for Holy Communion, to clear a space for presentations and musical performances. A new table, of a simple, square and modern design, was installed. It was suggested by some traditional Anglicans that the older table, with its ornate carving, should be retained in its usual place in front of the reredos. It is not unusual for cathedrals in England, because of their vast size, to have tables in two positions. But as this was not the case in Sydney it was decided to abandon the old table rather than maintaining it at the risk of it being associated with the "high altar" of Roman Catholic and many Anglican churches (the communion table in an Anglican church in Sydney must be of wood and be able to be moved). In addition, a major consideration in not retaining the old table was that it was riddled with termite damage, a perpetual problem in the centre of Sydney.

Since the departure of Phillip Jensen, the old choir stalls have been reinstalled in their former position, and the more modern temporary ones are not in use. The eagle lecterns have been reinstated. The mobile "holy table, known as "Meals-on-Wheels", is still in use.

One of the treasures of the cathedral is the Great Bible of 1539 (printed at the date when Henry VIII ordered that every church should have a Bible in the English language). It was donated to St Andrew's by the church of St Andrew's Barnwell in Northamptonshire, United Kingdom, in thanksgiving for the Australia's generosity to post war-Britain. The prominent positioning of the Bible (in its glass case) at the side of the reredos is illustrative of the Sydney diocese's emphasis on belief in the Bible as the authoritative "Word of God". The emphasis of Sydney Anglican theology on an understanding of scripture, as against experiential spirituality, is confirmed by the apparent precedence of the book over the sacrament.

=== Condition ===
As at 7 July 2003, Physical condition is good. Archaeological potential is high.

=== Modifications and dates ===
==== Cathedral ====
- 1819 – foundation stone laid by Governor Macquarie. Work commences on a cathedral designed by Francis Greenway;
- 1820 – work ceases;
- 1837 – current foundation stone laid on the present site by Governor Bourke. Work commences on a single tower building designed by Bishop Broughton and James Hume;
- 1842 – work suspended during depression through lack of funds. Edmund Blacket arrives in Sydney and assumes position of "Church Architect";
- 1846 – Edmund Blacket appointed architect for the completion of St Andrew's. Design adopted for twin towers;
- 1861-1867 – a 21 piece stained glass window collection provided on order by John Hardman and Co of Birmingham UK;
- 1866 – William Hill and Son organ installed in the south transept;
- 1868 – St Andrew's Cathedral consecrated and opened on St Andrew's Day;
- 1869 – first reredos added;
- 1874 – towers and pinnacles completed;
- 1884 – Chapter House erected as a memorial to Bishop Frederick Barker;
- 1888 – new reredos completed;
- 1890s – Chapter House added;
- 1903 – relocation of choir stalls one bay east to open the crossing originally planned by Blacket;
- 1929-31 – north transept organ loft designed and built;
- 1936 – side chapel created in south aisle;
- 1941 – decision to reorient the cathedral;
- 1942-1960 – emphasis on exterior of building repairs and rebuilding of southern transept, roofs and pinnacles;
- 1990s – cathedral returned to former orientation.

==== Chapter house ====
- 1892 – recesses in the floor for aisles were infilled;
- 1895 – cloister infilled with coloured glass and gas lighting introduced to upper level;
- 1913-15 – alterations include dismantling of east wall and re-erection, doorway infilled with glass and a new door opened.

== Music ==
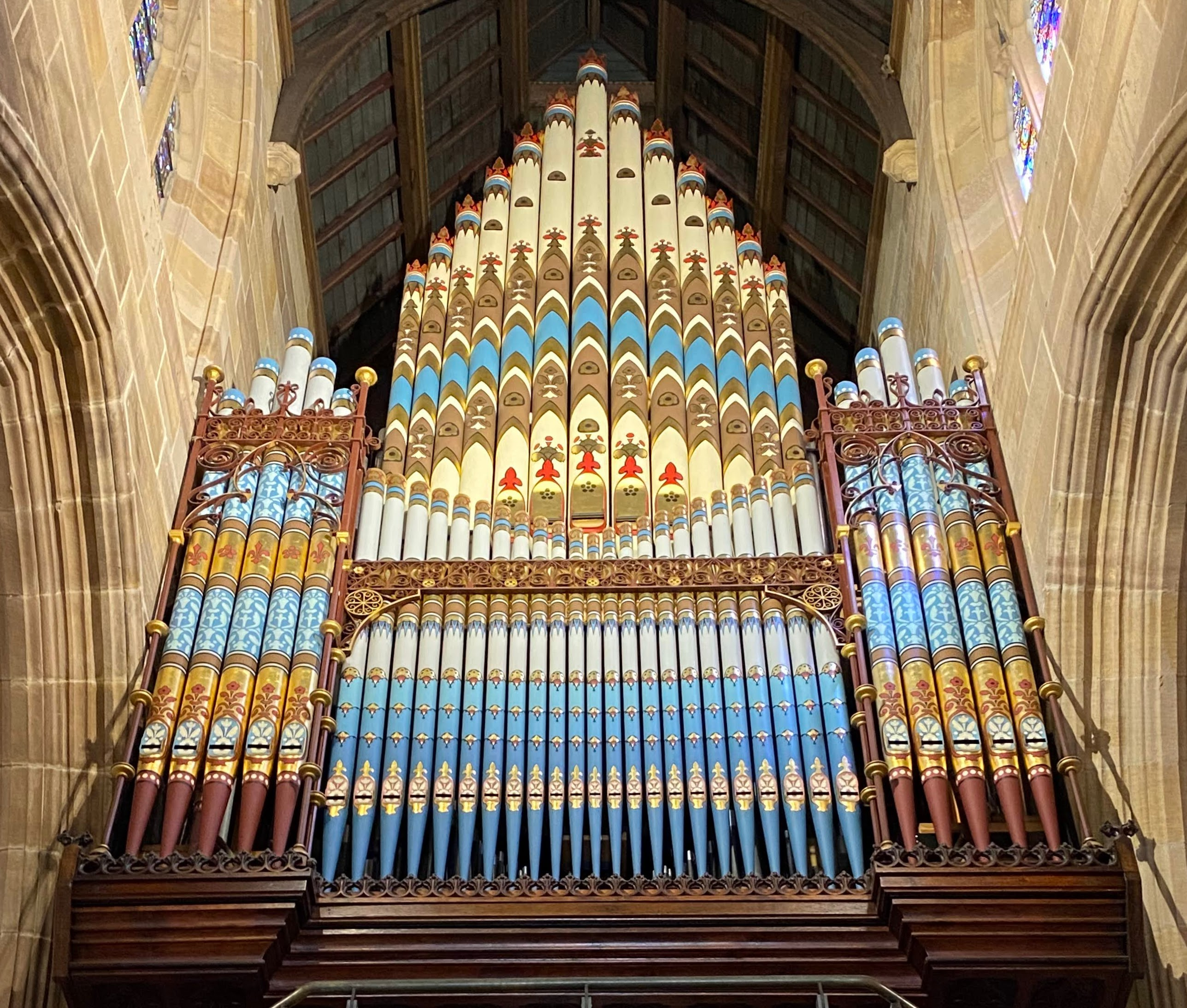
Organ by Hill, 1866

=== Pipe organ ===
In 1866 a pipe organ by the prominent English organ builders William Hill & Sons was installed with a case to Edmund Blacket's design and richly decorated organ pipes. It was placed in the south transept. The cathedral's first organist was Montague Younger.

In 1932 an organ by John Whitely was placed opposite in the north transept. In the 1950s the instruments were amalgamated to be played from a single console, thus constituting the largest church organ in Australia. There was a further rationalisation of the organs in 1998 with a restoration by the Canadian firm of Orgues Létourneau. The Whitely was removed from the north transept gallery. The organ, as reconstituted by Letourneau, consists of four manuals with mechanical action, comprising the rebuilt Hill organ, together with the best of the Whitely pipework.

There are regular Thursday afternoon recitals by Australian and international organists, commencing at 1:10 pm and usually lasting for 30 or 40 minutes. These recitals have been held for over 40 years.

=== Organists and masters of the choristers ===
Ordinal	Name	Term start	Term end	Notes
1	Montague Younger	1868	1899	
2	Joseph Massey	1900	1923	
3	F. Mewton	1923	1926	
4	Thomas Haigh	1927	1927	
5	Thomas Beckett	1928	1947	
6	Edgar Bainton	1948	1948	Acting
7	Hugh Bancroft	1948	1953	
8	Kenneth Long	1953	1957	
9	Mervyn John Byers	1957	1965	
10	Michael Hemans	1966	1980	
11	Michael Deasey	1981	2005	
12	Ross Cobb	2005	present	

=== Choir ===
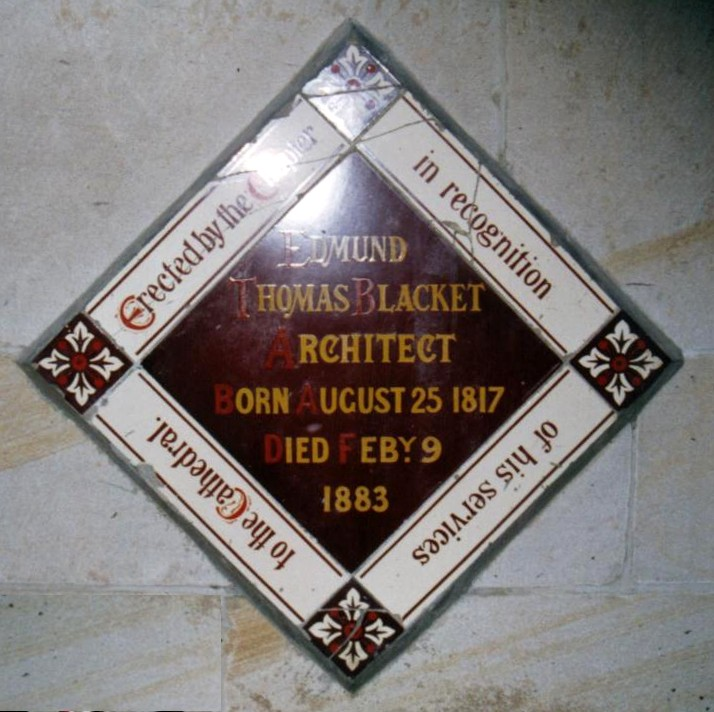
Memorial hatchment to Edmund Blacket

The Cathedral Choir of men and boys began in the 1820s, prior to the building of the previous wooden cathedral adjacent to the current site. This makes the cathedral choir the oldest continuous musical institution in Australia. There have been several notable alumni of the choir, two of the most prominent non-musicians being Australia's first prime minister, Sir Edmund Barton, and the pioneer aviator Sir Charles Kingsford Smith. In 1885 St Andrew's Cathedral School was founded by the third Bishop of Sydney, Bishop Barry, for the purpose of providing choristers to sing the daily services at the cathedral. For many years the enrolment stood at 46 boys and the headmaster was also the Master of Choristers and precentor of the cathedral. The school began to expand in 1941 and for many years in the latter part of the 20th century the enrolment stood at 700 and catered for boys from Years 3 to 12. In 1999 girls were admitted to senior years and in 2008 St Andrew's Cathedral School became fully co-educational from kindergarten.

In 2004 the former dean altered the form of service in the cathedral in keeping with his inclination to rationalise the worship on "Sydney Anglican" principles. This had decreased the formal participation of the cathedral choir and has been met by some controversy. (Note: "Peter Phillips is conductor of one of the world's most famous choirs, The Tallis Scholars, as well as being a regular columnist for The Spectator. In his most recent column he launched a blistering attack on the Sydney Anglicans, claiming the Jensen brothers are vandalising Anglican music and culture in Sydney...")

Since 2005, the Director of Music has been Ross Cobb, previously Director of Music at Christ Church, Clifton, in Bristol, England. He is an Associate of King's College London and holds a Bachelor of Music from the Royal Academy of Music and King's College, London.

Since the 1970s the choir has regularly toured abroad. The most recent international tour was to Europe in July 2008 and was made to mark the 140th anniversary of the choir. The choir sang in Bristol Cathedral (with the world-renowned Black Dyke Colliery Band), Wells Cathedral, Bath Abbey and St Paul's Cathedral, London, in the presence of the Australian High Commissioner. The choir also sang for the first time in the Basilica of San Marco in Venice as well as the Anglican churches of Venice and Florence.

The choir sings at the morning "Sunday Church" and Evensong on Monday (trebles only) and Thursday nights (full choir).

=== Bells ===
St Andrew's has a peal of 12 bells cast by John Taylor & Co. of Loughborough in England and installed in 1965 to the memory of Ernest Samuel Trigg. The tenor weighs 29 1/4 cwt and the lightest 6 1/2 cwt. They are rung by members of The Australian and New Zealand Association of Bellringers each Sunday morning and on practice nights.

== Specifications ==
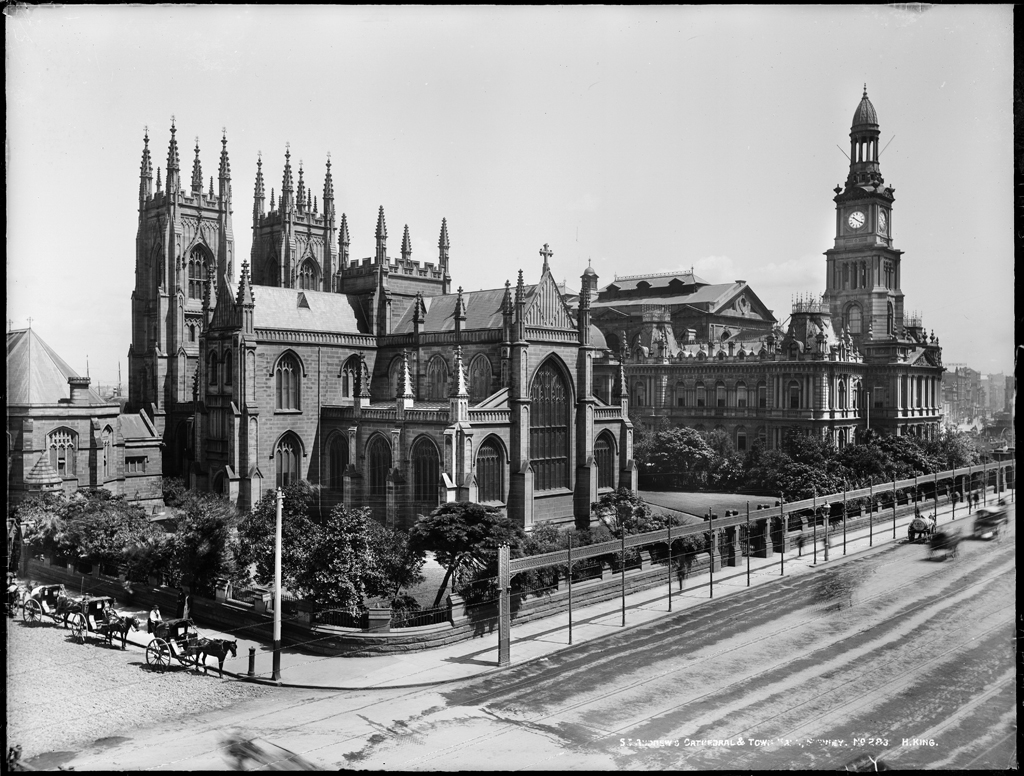
St Andrew's and Sydney Town Hall, circa 1900

=== Materials ===
The following material were used in the construction of the cathedral:

Building section	Material	Notes
Building	Sydney sandstone	
Roof	Welsh slate	
Roof timber		
Lower windows	Hardman of Birmingham, 1861-8	east and west windows, transept windows
Nave clerestory windows	designer, Norman Carter, 1953-4	
Chancel and transept clerestory windows	various, including Lyon and Cottier, Falconer and Ashwin and English firms	
Floor	Minton intaglio tiles	
Chancel floor	Cosmateque tiles by Fields of London	
Pulpit and Choir stalls	English Oak	
Reredos	English Alabaster	
Pulpit	Otago sandstone and Gabo Island granite	

== Heritage listing ==
The cathedral is part of the Town Hall Group, a group of heritage-listed buildings in that part of Sydney. Apart from the cathedral, the group includes the Sydney Town Hall (designed by Wilson and Bond, built 1886–89), the Queen Victoria Building (designed by George McRae, built 1893–98), the former Gresham Hotel (149 York Street, designed by J. Kirkpatrick, built c. 1890) and the former Bank of New South Wales (facade only), 485 George Street (designed by Varney Parkes, built 1894).

=== New South Wales State Heritage Register ===
As at 1 July 2003, St Andrew's Cathedral is one of the finest Gothic-revival church buildings in New South Wales and is the pre-eminent church building within the Sydney Anglican Diocese. The building represents the aspirations of the Colony and was the focus of much of Sydney life both during and after its construction. The completion of the Cathedral building was a major achievement for both the church and the City of Sydney. The building has high spiritual significance for both Anglicans and the wider community. It has been the "State" church for many major events. The building group has high aesthetic significance as a finely crafted and detailed group of structures. The Cathedral interior has high aesthetic value, even in its altered form, containing much of the original furniture and fittings including the Hill organ. The Cathedral contains a very fine and significant set of stained glass windows that predominantly date from the time of construction. The cathedral has historic significance as it has reflected the growth of the Anglican Church and changes in Anglicanism and for its associations with prominent church and civic persons.

St Andrew's Cathedral, Sydney was listed on the New South Wales State Heritage Register on 3 September 2004 having satisfied the following criteria.

The place is important in demonstrating the course, or pattern, of cultural or natural history in New South Wales.

St Andrew's Cathedral is of historic significance as the place of the first cathedral to be commenced in Australia. It reflects the changing views and attitudes both theological and social within the Diocese of Sydney in the physical changes that have taken place to the building. The collection of furniture, fixtures, artefacts and memorials record the history of the building, the history of the Anglican church in Sydney and key personalities involved in both church and civic life who have been associated with the building, the link between the building and the wider church with relics and items from other churches throughout the world and a tradition in quality of craftsmanship and design which can be seen from the 1860s to the present day. Its place in the development of architectural design and thought in the colony, as a perfect example of the colonial desire to reproduce England in Australia in the mid-nineteenth century which affected the design of many churches to follow in the colony. It is an example of the connection and inter-relationship of Church and State in the Colonial and Victorian periods. The Hill Organ, 1866, the first of approximately 40 organs they provided to NSW and one of the last to be made by Hill before his death. The Kinloch organ, the second organ to be built in the Colony of New South Wales.

The place has a strong or special association with a person, or group of persons, of importance of cultural or natural history of New South Wales's history.

Its association with Edmund Blacket the most prominent architect of the period who was responsible for forming much of the character of Sydney in the mid-nineteenth century. It is association with a series of significant architects in Sydney including Cyril Blacket, Burcham Clamp, Wiltshire and Day and Professor Leslie Wilkinson all of whom made contributions to the building in both additions and maintenance of the fabric.

The place is important in demonstrating aesthetic characteristics and/or a high degree of creative or technical achievement in New South Wales.

St Andrew's Cathedral is of aesthetic significance for the high quality of the Gothic design and detailing of the building. It is one of the major Gothic buildings in Sydney and even though small in comparison to many cathedrals is well executed showing the hand of Blacket. It has strong visual qualities within the Sydney Square precinct. The building has a very fine interior and houses a collection of furniture, fixtures and fittings that date from the time of construction. With the exception of several smaller additions identified as not having significance the buildings form a unified complex which, even though sited on a restricted site provide a group envisaged by Blacket. The cathedral is sited in the major civic and ceremonial precinct in the city and is a key element in the streetscape and townscape of the city. It is a landmark building that is widely recognised and admired by the community. Although altered, the Hill organ is a fine instrument with a very good tonal quality. The organ case and pipework are an important element of the cathedral interior. The addition of the Kinloch organ to the cathedral enhances the music and appearance of the interior.

The place has a strong or special association with a particular community or cultural group in New South Wales for social, cultural or spiritual reasons.

St Andrew's Cathedral is of social significance as the location of major State occasions which have high social value to the community in general and to specific groups within the community. It is a tourist attraction drawing each year several thousand Australian and overseas tourists. It is the home of the Cathedral Choir and staff who have always been housed within the cathedral complex. It has cultural value to the City of Sydney as a venue for concerts and recitals and a place of civic activity. It has been the site of major relief programmes during national crisis and has been one of the key symbols in Sydney of stability and order.

St Andrew's Cathedral is of spiritual significance and its existence is a statement of Christian spiritual values. It has been the focus of Christian worship, including instruction, nurture and evangelism, for members of the Anglican Church in the area since 1868. The physical layout of St Andrew's is of spiritual significance for its symbolism in relating spiritual concepts to earthly forms.

The place has potential to yield information that will contribute to an understanding of the cultural or natural history of New South Wales.

St Andrew's Cathedral is of technical/research significance for being the most ambitious church building to be undertaken in the colony of a scale seen in England and Europe, but not before in Sydney. The high level of technical skill seen in the execution of the building, particularly the stonework and carving, construction of the towers, stained glass windows, joinery and furniture and innovative organ design.

The place possesses uncommon, rare or endangered aspects of the cultural or natural history of New South Wales.

St Andrew's Cathedral is rare on a statewide basis as one of the finest Gothic-revival church buildings in New South Wales and is the pre-eminent church building within the Sydney Anglican Diocese.

The place is important in demonstrating the principal characteristics of a class of cultural or natural places/environments in New South Wales.

The main glass in the cathedral is one of the finest collections of Hardman glass in Australia and represents the work of an important English stained glass artist.

=== Other heritage registers ===
On 21 March 1978 the cathedral and chapter house were listed on the (now defunct) Register of the National Estate. St Andrew's has a National Trust of Australia heritage listing as being a building of national significance.

== Deans of St Andrew's ==
The following individuals have served as Deans of St Andrew's Cathedral:

Ordinal	Name	Term start	Term end	Notes
1	William Macquarie Cowper	1858	1902	
-	Post vacant	1902	1912	
2	Albert Edward Talbot	1912	1936	
3	Stuart Barton Babbage	1947	1953	Afterwards Dean of Melbourne, 1953
4	Eric Arthur Pitt	1953	1962	
5	Arthur William Goodwin-Hudson	1962	1964	Coadjutor Bishop
6	Francis Oag Hulme-Moir	1965	1967	Coadjutor Bishop
7	Archibald Wentworth Morton	1967	1973	
8	Lance R. Shilton	1973	1988	
9	Kenneth Herbert Short	1989	1992	Bishop
10	Boak Alexander Jobbins	1992	2002	
11	Phillip David Jensen	2003	2014	
12	Kanishka de Silva Raffel	2016	2021	Afterwards Archbishop of Sydney
13	Sandy Grant	2021	present	

== Picture gallery ==
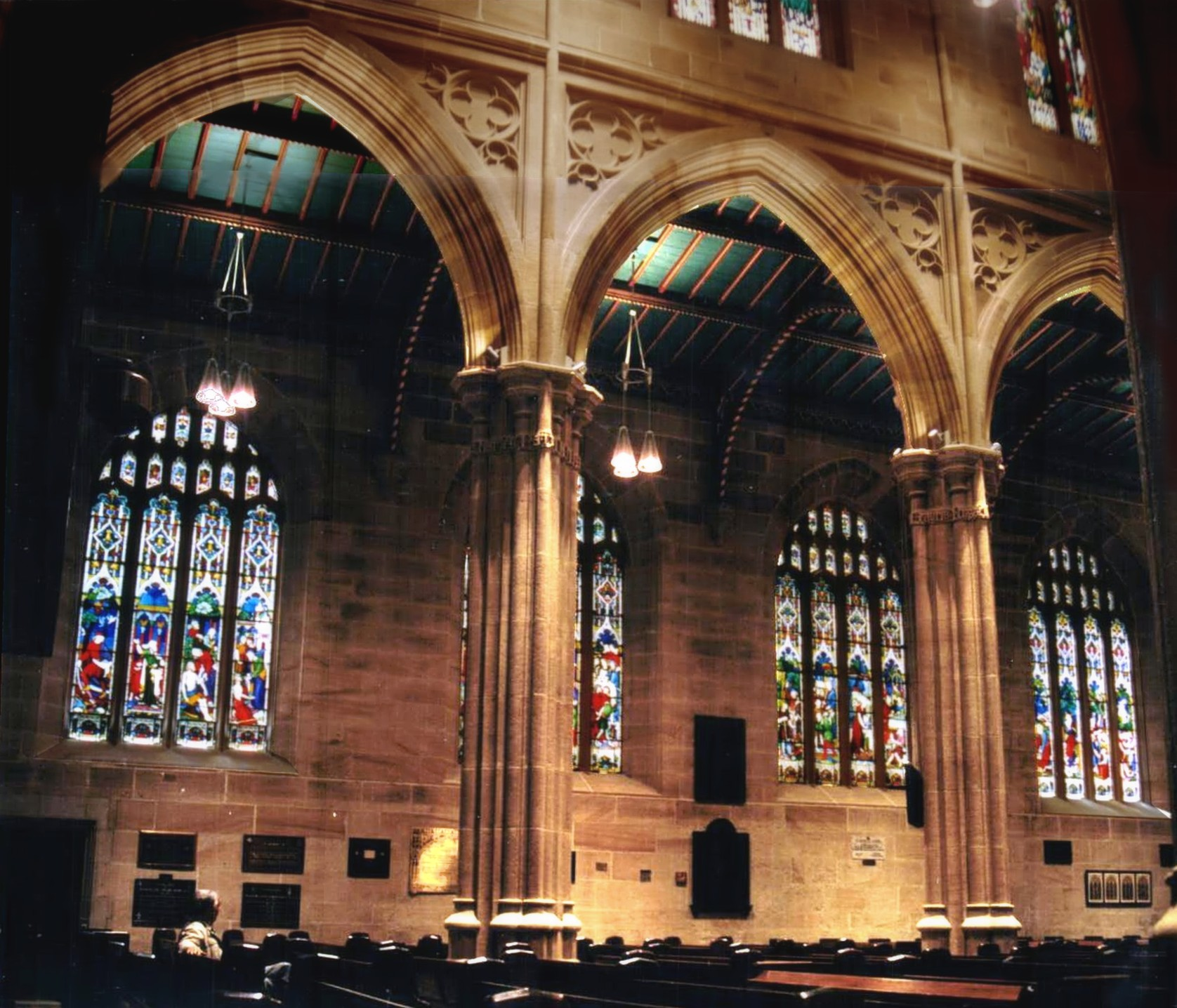
Nave

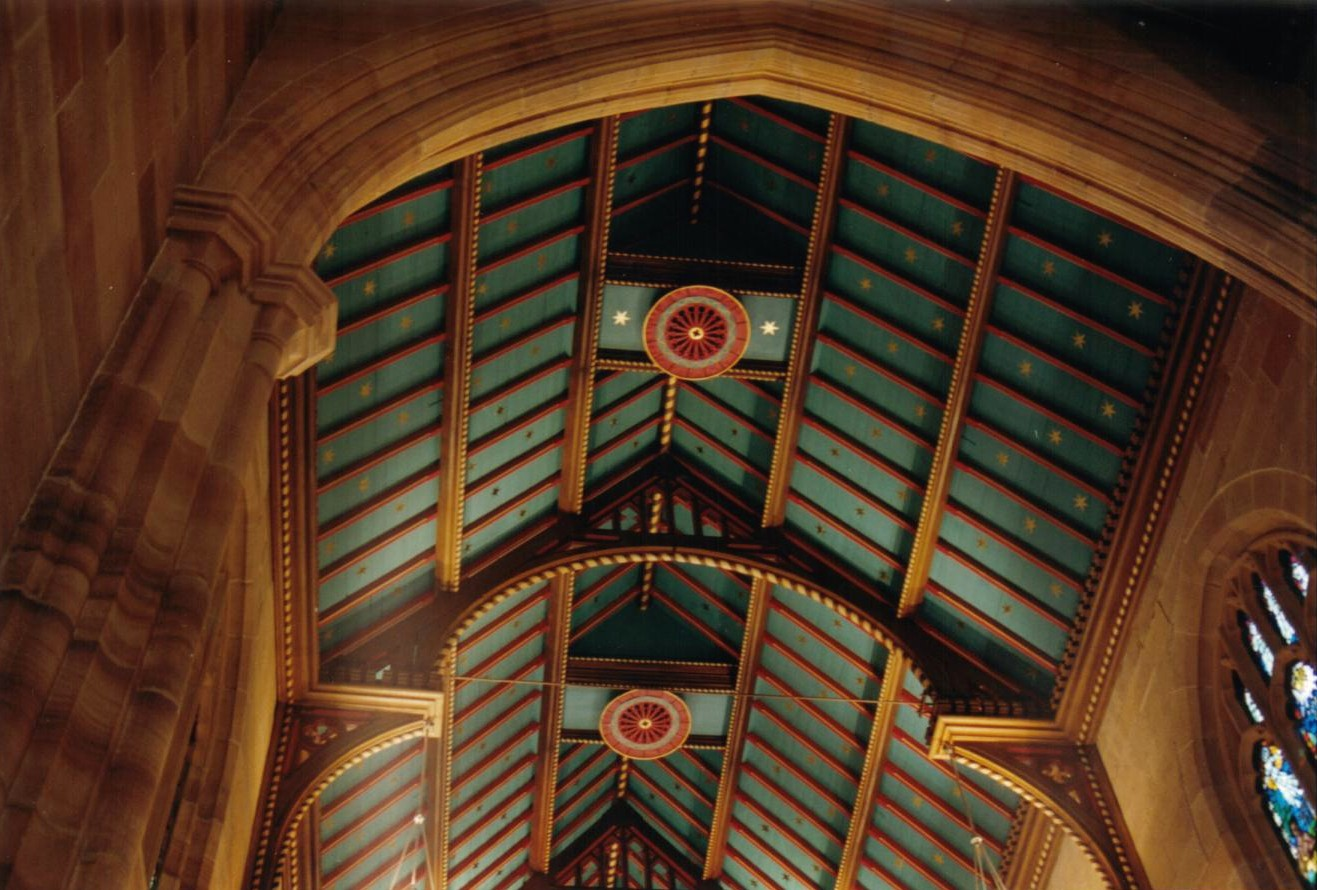
Hammer-beam roof

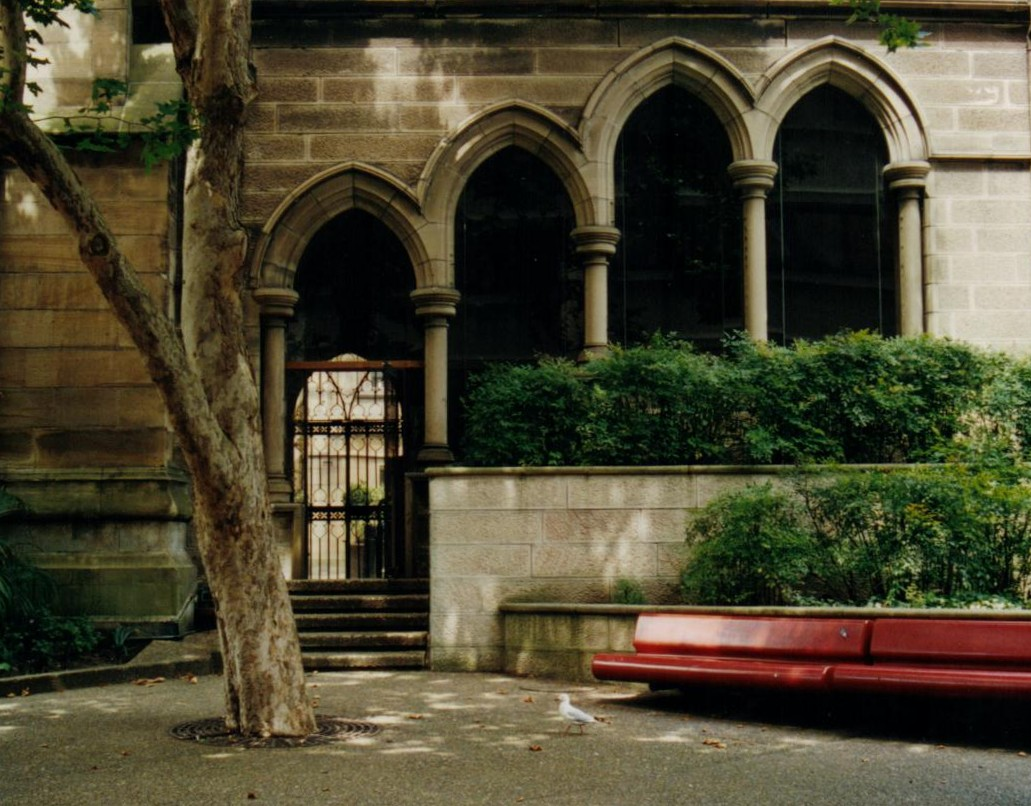
Chapter House stairs
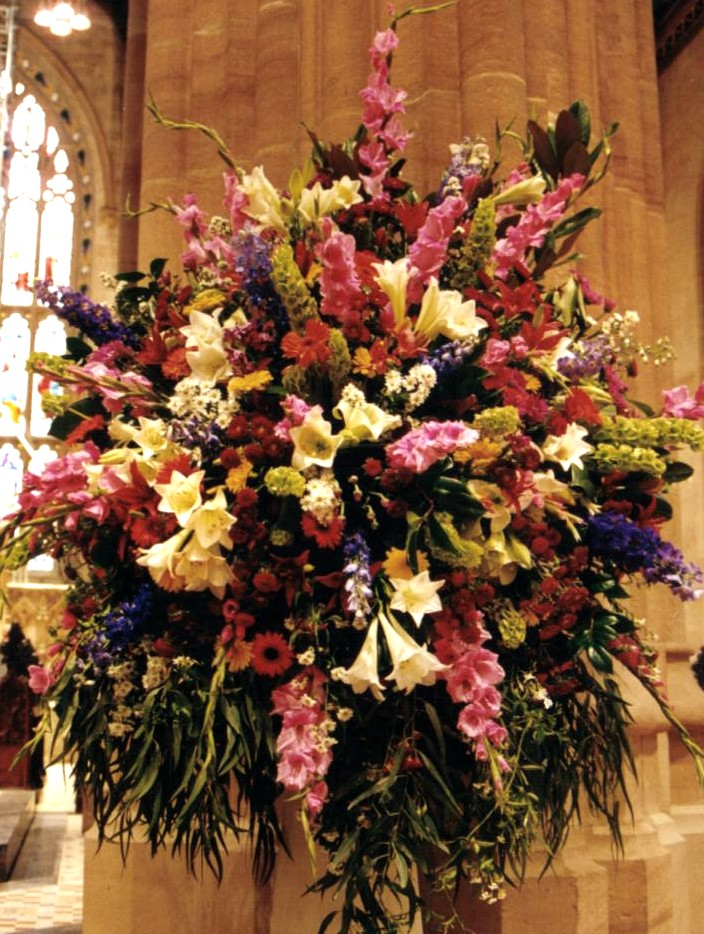
Floral arrangement

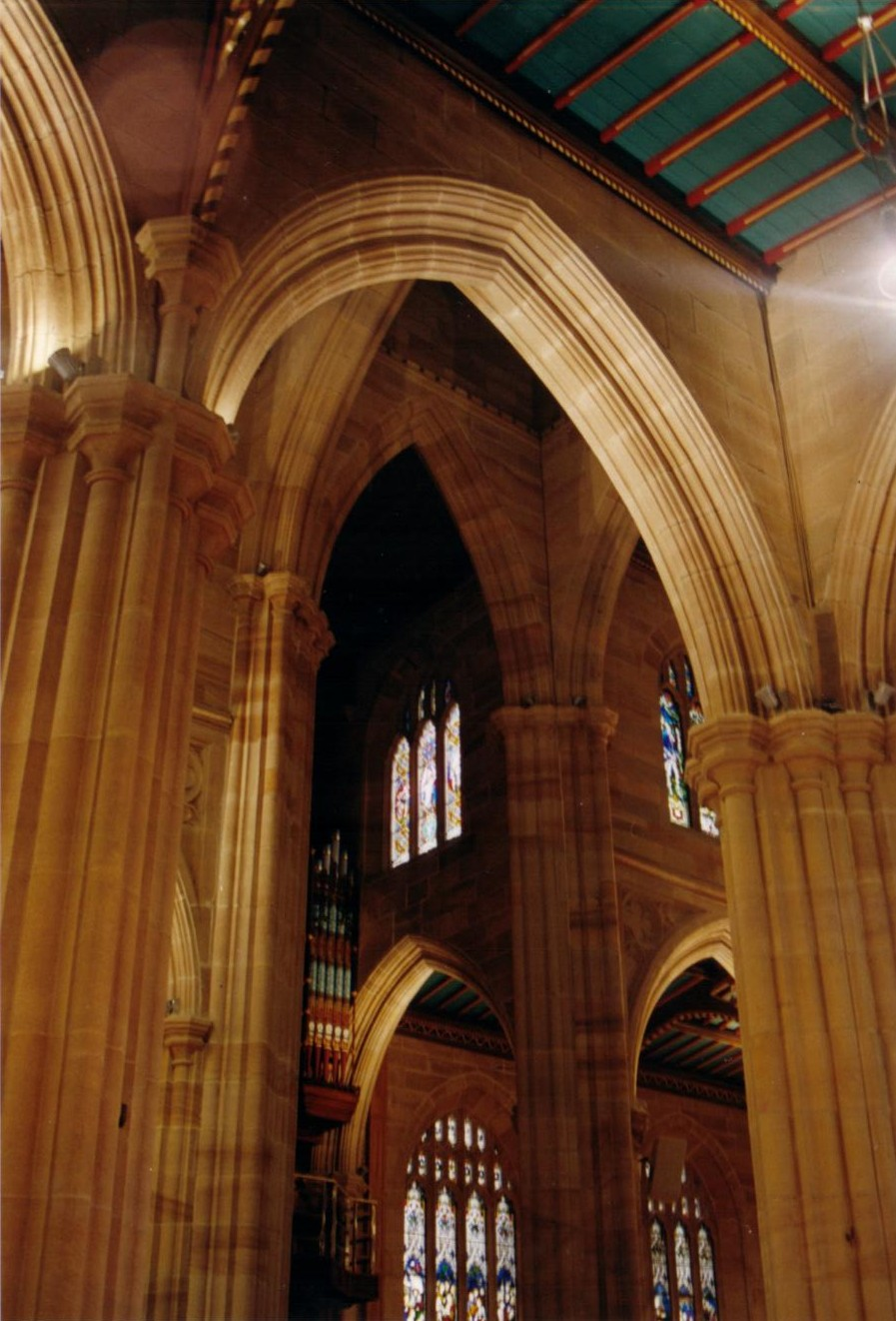
Across the transept

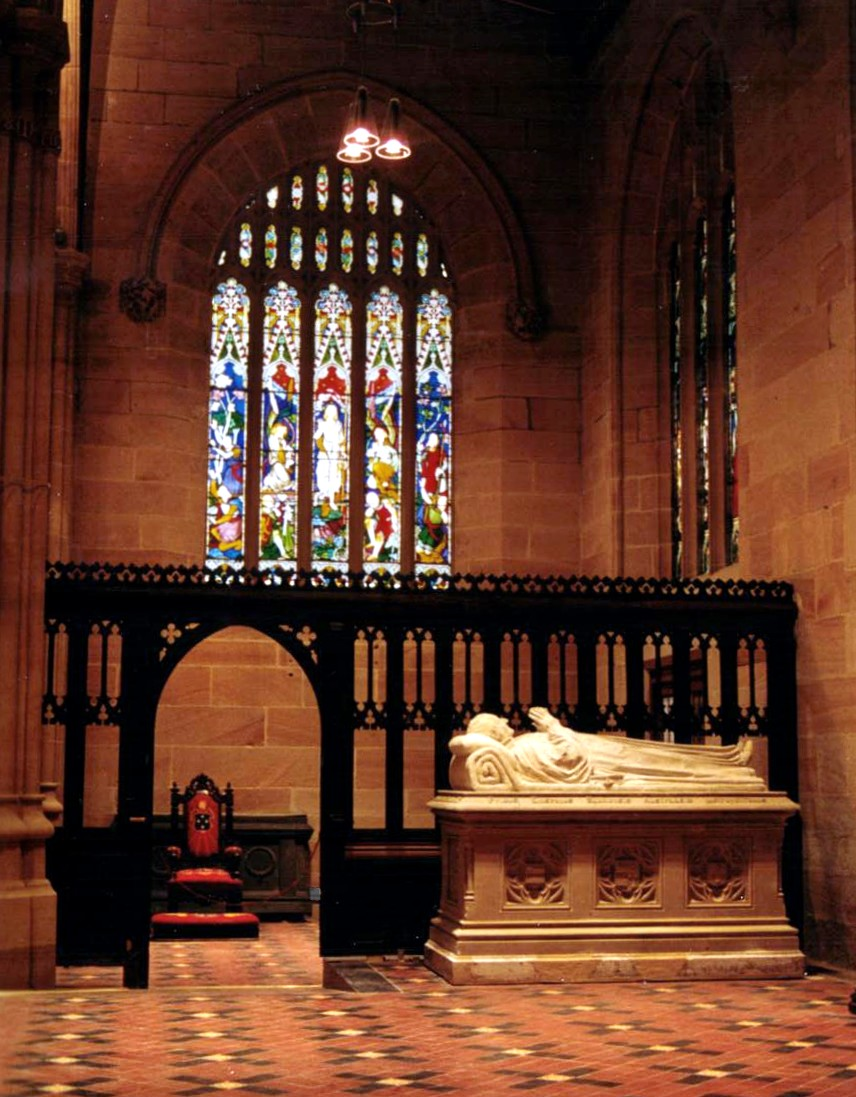
Memorial of Bishop Broughton"

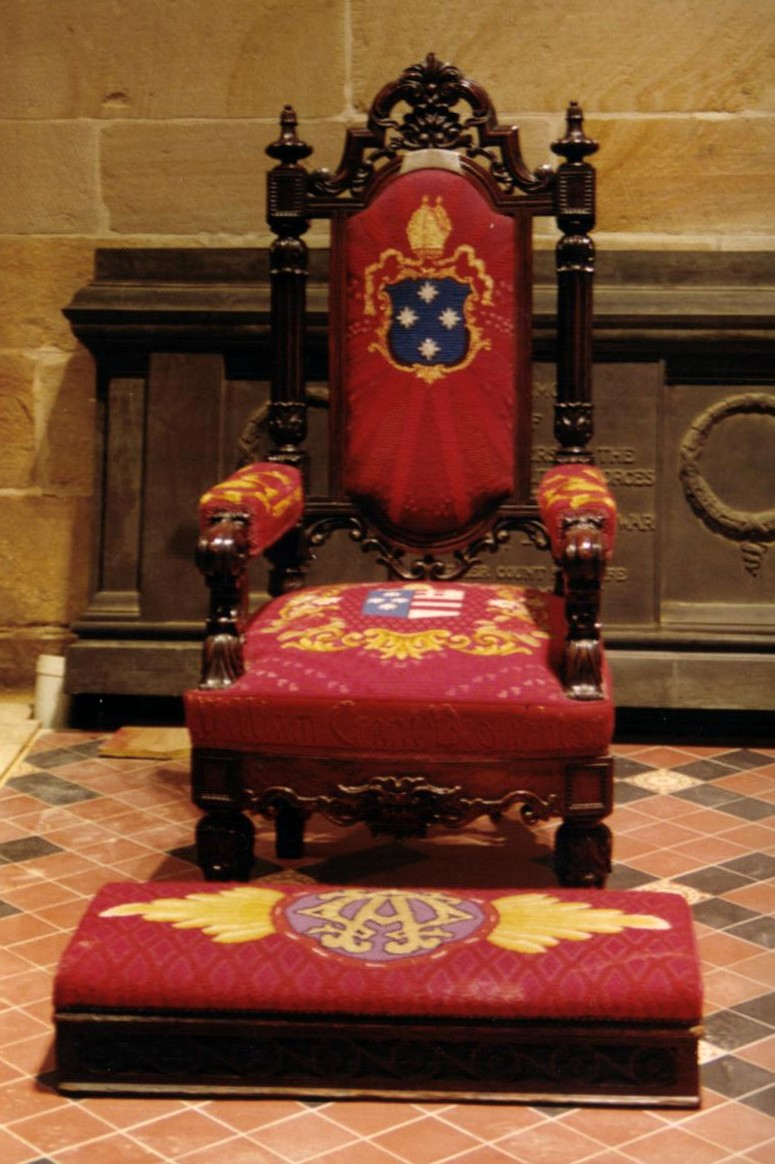
Bishop Broughton's chair
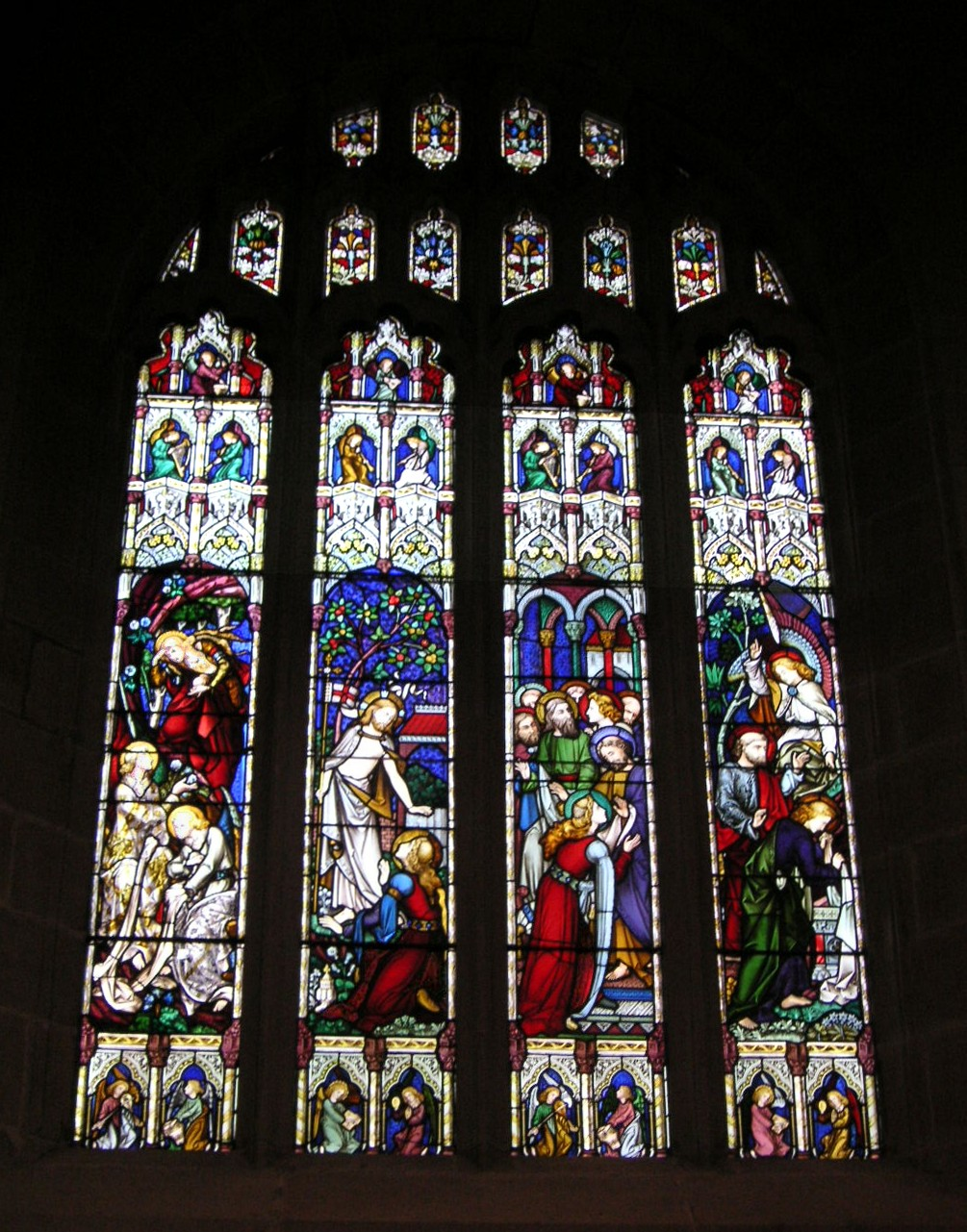
"Christ is Risen!

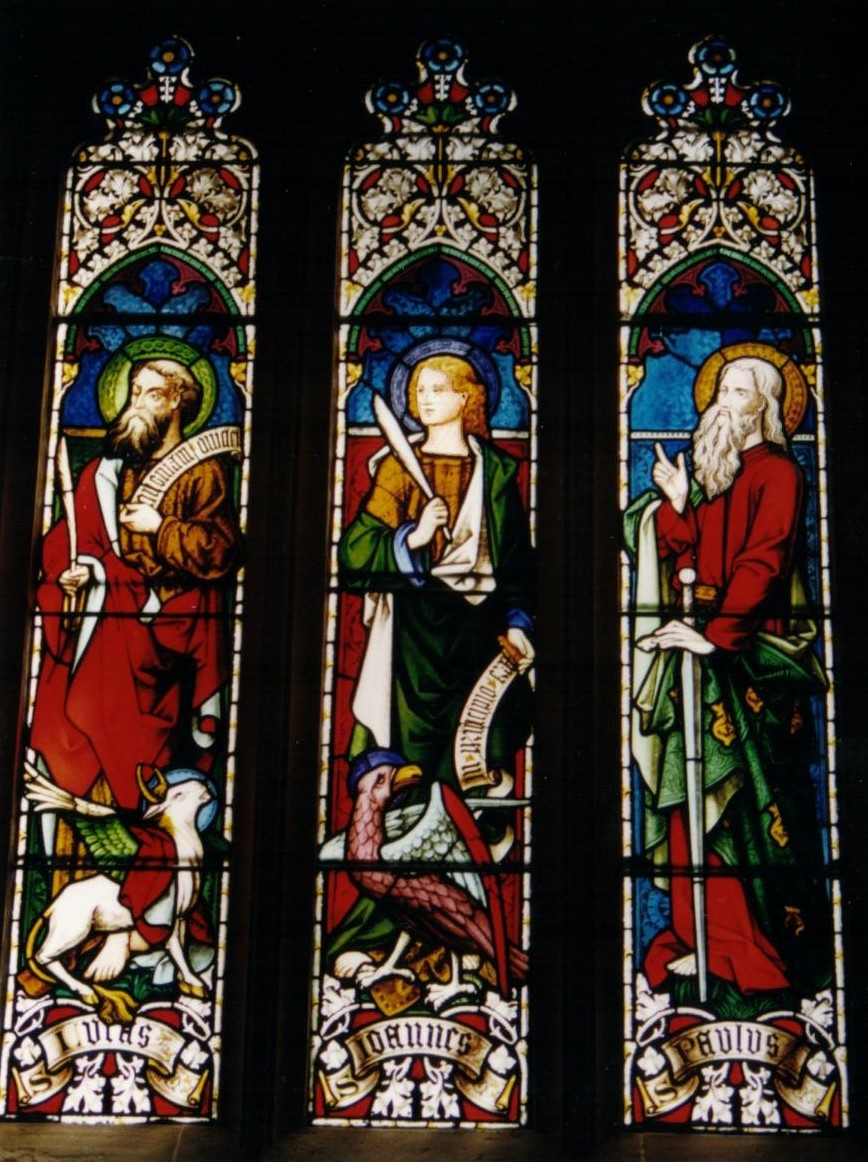
The Evangelists Luke, John and Paul, from the west window

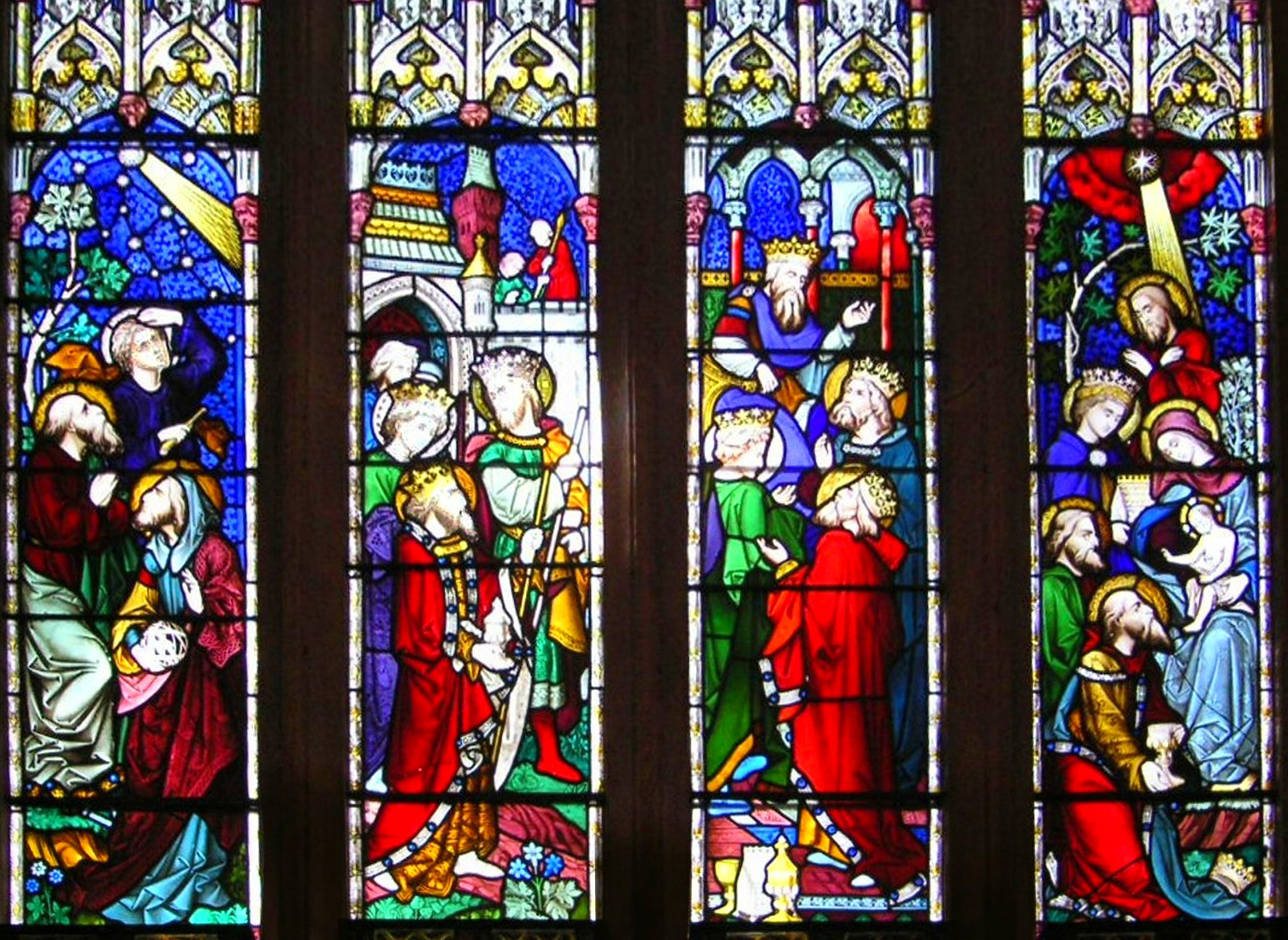
"And the Word was made flesh and dwelt among us, and we beheld his Glory...full of Grace and Truth."

== See also ==
- List of Anglican bishops of Sydney
- List of Anglican churches in the Diocese of Sydney
- Cathedral architecture of Western Europe
- Gothic Revival
- Poor Man's Bible
- Augustus Welby Pugin
- St Mary's Cathedral, Sydney, the Roman Catholic cathedral of Sydney
- St Andrew's Cathedral (disambiguation)
- List of cathedrals in Australia
