= Lance Shilton =

Australian Anglican cleric (1921-1998)

Lancelot Rupert Shilton AM (30 December 1921 – 12 March 1998) was an Australian Anglican cleric. He became the 8th Dean of Sydney on 30 November 1973, remaining in office until 1988.

Shilton was born in late 1921 in Elsternwick, Victoria, a suburb of Melbourne. He was educated at the University of Melbourne and ordained in 1950. His first post was as a curate in Hawthorn. Then he was the incumbent at Carlton from 1951 to 1954. After this he was at the University of London for two years completing a Bachelor of Divinity degree. From 1957 to 1973, he was the rector of Holy Trinity, Adelaide.

In 1985, he was appointed a Member of the Order of Australia (AM). He died on 12 March 1998.

Religious titles
Preceded by Archibald Wentworth Morton	Dean of Sydney; 1973–1988	Succeeded by Kenneth Herbert Short
