= Eric Pitt =

Eric Arthur Pitt was Dean of Sydney from 1953 until 1962.

He was educated at Emmanuel College, Cambridge and ordained in 1938. His first post was as a curate at Halliwell. Then he was Vicar of St Matthew, Rugby from 1946 to his Dean’s appointment. After this he was the Archdeacon of (successively) Cumberland, Wollongong and Camden.

Religious titles
Preceded by Stuart Babbage	Dean of Sydney; 1953–1962	Succeeded by Arthur Goodwin Hudson
