= Boak Jobbins =

Boak Jobbins OAM (29 April 1947 – 1 September 2012) was an Australian cleric of the Anglican Diocese of Sydney and Dean of Sydney.

== Early life ==
Jobbins was born in Sydney, Australia. He studied law at Sydney University and theology at Moore Theological College. He married his wife, Dianne Whalley, in 1972.

Jobbins was ordained in 1972. He is the author of commentaries and co-author of the Introduction to the Bible textbook for the Moore College Correspondence Course.

== Education and ministry ==
After curacies at Dural and Holy Trinity, Adelaide, he was Rector of Mowbray from 1977 to 1983 and rector of Pymble from 1983 to 1992.

For 10 years, until 2002, Jobbins exercised a wide ministry as Dean of Sydney and played a major role in the cathedral's restoration. He then served as rector of St Mark's Darling Point from 2002 and was made an honorary canon of St Andrew's Cathedral.

In 2001, Jobbins was awarded the Centenary Medal, and in 2003, he was awarded the Medal of the Order of Australia for religious service, mainly through the Diocese of Sydney and to the community.

Jobbins was succeeded as Dean of Sydney by Phillip Jensen. He died in 2012, aged 65.

== See also ==
- Anglican Diocese of Sydney
- St Andrew's Cathedral, Sydney
