= James Hume (architect) =

Australian architect

James Hume (1798 – 15 November 1868) was one of the first architects in Sydney, Australia.

He drew up the first plans for St. Andrew's Cathedral, Sydney and was the designer of the first synagogue in Australia in York Street Sydney, which opened in 1844.

Hume died on 15 November 1868 and was buried in the Devonshire Street Cemetery in Sydney.
