= St Andrew's Cathedral School =

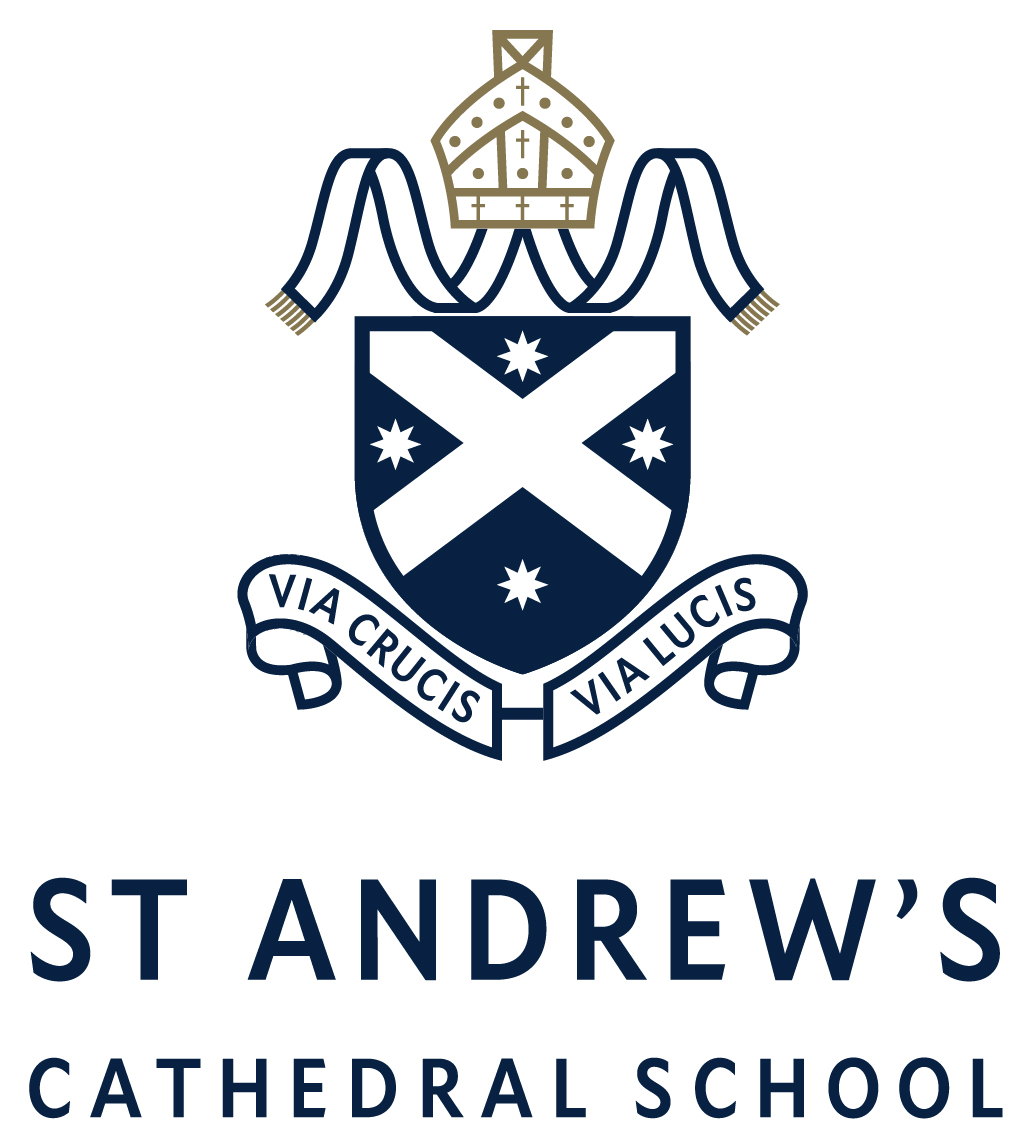

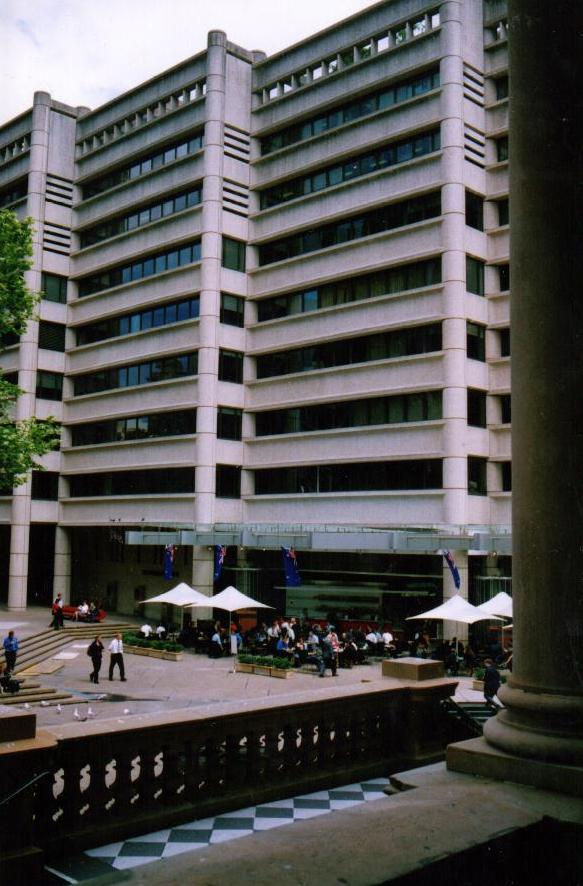
- SACS House, viewed from Sydney Town Hall, 2007

Location
- Sydney central business district, New South Wales; Australia; 33°52′25″S 151°12′20″E

Information
- Type: Independent co-educational comprehensive and specialist primary and secondary day school
- Motto: Latin: Via Crucis Via Lucis (The Way of the Cross is the Way of Light)
- Religious affiliation: Diocese of Sydney
- Denomination: Anglicanism
- Established: 14 July 1885; 141 years ago
- Founder: Alfred Barry, Third Bishop of Sydney
- Educational authority: New South Wales Education Standards Authority
- Specialist: Choir school; Indigenous primary school
- Chairman: Kanishka Raffel
- Head of School: Julie McGonigle
- Staff: ~123 (2008)
- Years: K–12
- Enrolment: c. 1,282 (2018)
- Campus: Sydney CBD: SACS House, Sydney Square; Bishop Barry Centre, Druitt Street; Chippendale: St Andrew’s College, University of Sydney; Ultimo: Wentworth Park Sporting Complex; Penrose: Outdoor education
- Colours: Blue and white
- Slogan: Life Giving Learning
- Affiliations: International Choir Schools' Association; Independent Schools Association; Association of Heads of Independent Schools of Australia; Junior School Heads Association of Australia
- Alumni: Old Andreans
- External tests: International Baccalaureate; NSW Higher School Certificate
- Website: sacs.nsw.edu.au

St Andrew's Cathedral School is a multi-campus independent Anglican co-educational comprehensive and specialist primary and secondary day school, located in the Sydney central business district, New South Wales, Australia. The school currently caters for approximately 1450 students from Kindergarten to Year 12.

The School is one of Sydney's oldest, founded in 1885, as a choir school for St Andrew's Cathedral, Sydney. St Andrew's is legally supervised by the Cathedral Chapter which appoints and approves members of the School Council which was formed in 1979. The council is responsible for administering the School's policies and formulating its mission and vision as well as appointing successive Heads of School. A boys' school for much of its history, St Andrew's opened its doors to senior girls (Year 10 to Year 12) in 1999. In 2008, the school became a fully co-educational school with boys and girls enrolled from Kindergarten to Year 12. In addition to providing a comprehensive education and a specialist choir school, the School operates an Indigenous primary school, called Gawura.

The School is a member of the International Choir Schools' Association, the Independent Schools Association (ISA), the Association of Heads of Independent Schools of Australia (AHISA), and the Junior School Heads Association of Australia (JSHAA).

In 2009, St Andrew's became an IB World School and commenced offering the International Baccalaureate Diploma as an alternative leaving qualification to the NSW Higher School Certificate (HSC).

The school is also known as the location of the 2023 murder of Lilie James.

== First 90 years ==
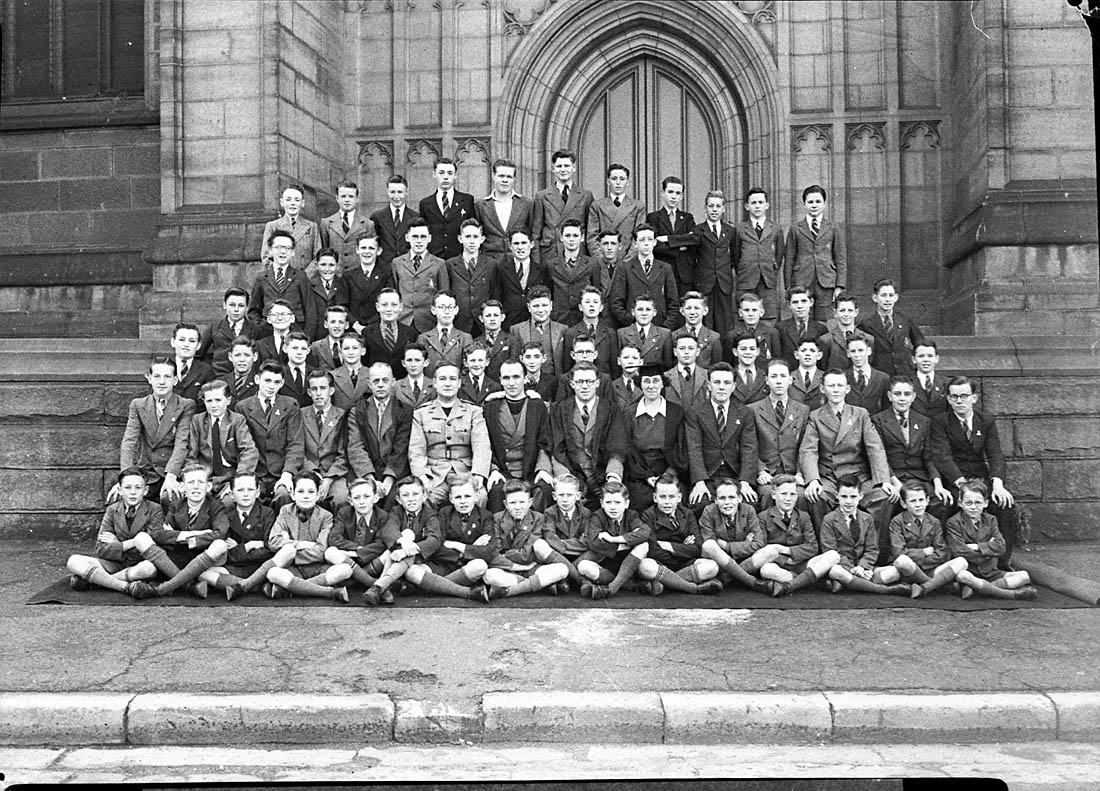
St Andrew's Cathedral School students with former headmaster Canon M. C. Newth outside St. Andrew's Cathedral, Sydney, c. 1944

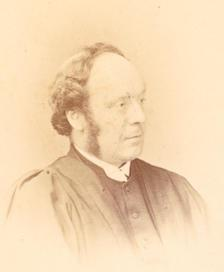
Bishop Alfred Barry, founder of St Andrew's Cathedral School

St Andrew's Cathedral School was founded by the third Bishop of Sydney, Metropolitan of New South Wales and Primate of Australia Alfred Barry. The school was opened as the St Andrew's Schoolroom on 14 July 1885 in the Old Baptist Church premises in Pitt Street, on the corner of Bathurst and Kent streets. At the school opening, Bishop Barry stated that St Andrew's was established to provide "the choristers with a high-class, free education on Church principles, in addition to a musical training". The school started with 27 boys, of whom 22 were choristers and, although it was later nicknamed the "Choir School", provision was made for non-choristers to attend. Enrolments reached a total of 80 in 1892, but suddenly dropped to about 50 and remained at this number for many years.

St. Andrew's Church in Pitt Street (now Stafford House) was the next home of the school, and remained so from 1892 to 1914, when it was moved to St. Phillip's Parish Hall, Church Hill (No. 1 York Street, Sydney).

The school made several subsequent moves, to the old Deanery (Church House) in 1917 and to the adjacent Worker newspaper printing works building in 1937. In 1961 the Cathedral Chapter and Standing Committee, after years of deliberation, decided to commence Stage One of a vast master plan to redevelop the Cathedral Site. As a result, Stage One of the "New School" was built along Kent Street, from the Bathurst Street corner and integrated with the adjoining old Worker Building.

That building lasted only eight school years from 1965 to 1972. There followed three-and-a-half years, from 1973 to August 1976, during which it was housed temporarily in the CENEF Building diagonally opposite across Bathurst and Kent Streets.

== Modern establishment ==
On 13 August 1976 St. Andrew's Cathedral School returned to its previous site and occupied the sixth, seventh and eighth floors, and rooftop of the newly constructed St. Andrew's House, where it remains. The school has its own entrance off Kent Street and a dedicated lift to levels 4, 5, 6, 7 and 8.

The school commenced outdoor education in 1982 using hired properties. During 1984, the school purchased a 40-hectare (100-acre) rural property at Penrose, near Moss Vale in the NSW Southern Highlands for its own outdoor education campus.

In 1991, the school established a senior secondary learning centre at 51 Druitt Street, Sydney, in close proximity to St Andrew's House. The Premier of NSW, Nick Greiner, officially opened the Bishop Barry Senior Secondary Centre. In 1997, the School Council decided that St Andrew's students would be better prepared for post-school work, study and lifestyle choices if the school became co-educational in Years 10, 11 and 12. Accordingly, in Term 1, 1999, the first 76 girls commenced in the Senior College. St Andrew's became the only co-educational school in the city.

In 1999, the school's Student Business Club formed a working partnership with the Sydney 2000 Paralympics Organising Committee (SPOC) to raise awareness of the Games. The students conducted a range of events over a two-year period that ultimately raised $100,000 to help stage the Sydney 2000 Paralympic Games.

In 2001, the school negotiated long-term occupancy in St Andrew's House by signing a 120-year lease for its facilities.

Canon Melville Cooper Newth OBE, the eleventh and longest-serving Headmaster of St Andrew's Cathedral School (1941-1979), died on 21 October 2004, aged 90.

The school marked its 120th year in 2005. At the same time, Phillip Heath celebrated his 10-year anniversary as the Head of School. This year also saw the School Council confirm the decision to vacate the Leadership and Enterprise Centre at 495 Kent Street. The main campus remains within the eight-storey St Andrew's House, located at 474 Kent Street.

On 22 September 2006, a new entrance to the school was opened by former Archbishop of Sydney, Sir Marcus Loane KBE. This was attended by the Lord Mayor of Sydney, Clover Moore, as well as many parents and friends of students. The contemporary entrance is directly opposite the west door to St Andrew's Cathedral in Sydney Square. The school's address subsequently changed from 474 Kent Street, Sydney to Sydney Square, Sydney. In 2008, the school successfully negotiated a lease with the Wentworth Park Stadium Trust to allow the School to use the Wentworth Park sporting fields and stadium. The lease also includes the exclusive use of a three-storey building on the eastern side of the field and change rooms on the western side. These lease arrangements are ongoing. On 20 November 2008, it was announced that the Head of School, Phillip Heath, after 14 years in the position, would depart the school to take up the principalship of Radford College, Canberra, effective from 1 July 2009. Dr John Collier, Head of St Paul's Grammar School for 12 years, was announced as his replacement on 4 June 2009, and commenced the position in Term 1, 2010.

=== Co-education ===
In Term 1, 1999 the school introduced the first girls into the senior college, and 76 girls entered into Years 10, 11 and 12.

During the 2006 Speech Night, the school revealed a plan to introduce full co-educational years from Kindergarten through to Year 12 in 2008. In 2006, the youngest female student was enrolled in Year 8, and graduated with the Class of 2010. During 2007, 10 girls were enrolled into the middle school (Years 7 to 9) and the school introduced twin classes (single-sex classes) in those years for the key subjects of English, Mathematics and Science. All other subjects, including sport, and in all other years of the school, are taught in a co-educational environment. St Andrew's was the first independent school in New South Wales to choose this twinning model in a coeducation environment.

== Visits by British royalty ==
Royals have attended services at the cathedral on numerous occasions, on all of which the school's choristers have sung and had the opportunity of meeting them:

- 1920 – 13 June, Edward, Prince of Wales
- 1927 – May, Prince Albert, Duke of York, and Elizabeth, Duchess of York
- 1945 – 11 March, Prince Henry, Duke of Gloucester and Alice, Duchess of Gloucester
- 1954 – 7 February, Queen Elizabeth II and Philip, Duke of Edinburgh
- 1958 – 23 February, Queen Elizabeth the Queen Mother
- 1963 – 3 March, the Queen and the Duke of Edinburgh, on 175th Anniversary of the Foundation of Australia by Governor Philip in 1788
- 1967 – 6 March, Princess Alexandra, on 150th Anniversary of the British and Foreign Bible Society in Australia
- 1970 – 30 March, the Queen, the Duke of Edinburgh, Charles, Prince of Wales and Princess Anne, on 200th Anniversary of Capt. James Cook's landing at Botany Bay
- 1973 – 21 October, Queen Elizabeth II and Prince Philip, Duke of Edinburgh, after opening the Sydney Opera House the previous day
- 1977 – 13 March, The Queen and the Duke of Edinburgh, on their Jubilee anniversary
- 1977 – 7 September, Charles, Prince of Wales
- 2006 – 13 March, The Queen and the Duke of Edinburgh, at the Commonwealth Day Observance in St Andrew's Cathedral

== Heads of school ==
The following individuals have served as Head of School or any precedent title:

Ordinal	Officeholder	Term start	Term end	Time in office	Notes
1	A. R. Rivers	1885	1892	6–7 years	
2	G. D. Shenton	1893	1895	1–2 years	
3	P. J. Simpson	1895	1907	21–22 years	
4	C. A. Brewer	November 1899	May 1900	0–1 years	
5	E. N. Wilton	1907	1916	8–9 years	
6	R. E. Freeth	1916	1918	1–2 years	
7	C. H. Lea	1918	1920	1–2 years	
8	M. Searcy	1920	1929	8–9 years	
9	L. N. Sutton	1930	1934	3–4 years	
10	M. K. Jones	1934	1938	3–4 years	
11	S. C. S. Begbie	1938	1941	2–3 years	
12	Canon Melville Cooper Newth OBE	1941	1979	37–38 years	
13	Allan K. Beavis	1979	1995	15–16 years	
14	Phillip J. Heath	1995	2009	13–14 years	
15	John Collier	2010	2021	10–11 years	
16	Julie McGonigle	2022	present	3–4 years	

== Campuses ==
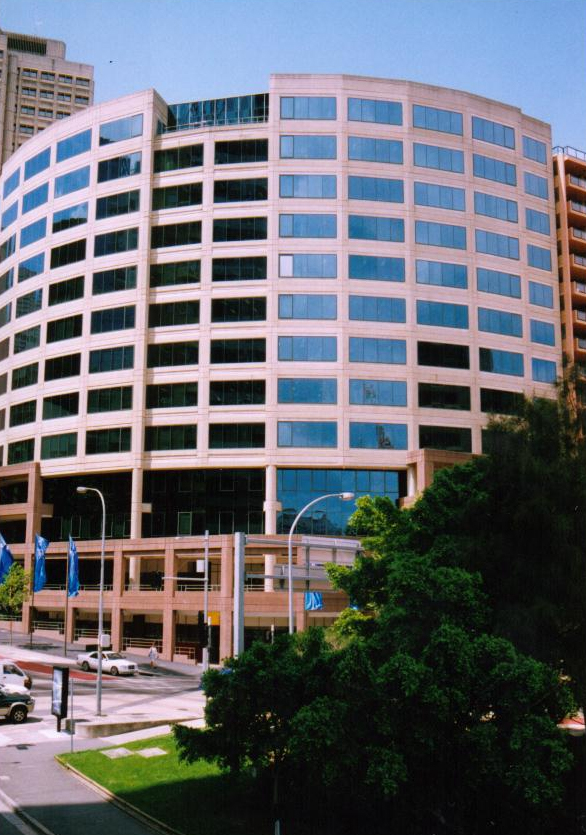
Bishop Barry Senior College occupies the lower ground floor, ground floor, and levels 1 to 4

St Andrew's Cathedral School is on two city campuses near Town Hall Station, St Andrew's House in Sydney Square and Bishop Barry Centre in Druitt Street. It has a leasing arrangement with St Andrew's College within the grounds of The University of Sydney and the nearby Wentworth Park Sporting Complex. The school also uses the university's facilities for basketball, swimming, tennis and squash.

St Andrew's also owns a rural property known as Kirrikee at Penrose, in the NSW Southern Highlands for its own outdoor education campsite.

=== Gawura campus ===
St Andrew's Cathedral School Gawura Campus crest

Headmaster M. C. Newth introduced Aboriginal and Torres Strait Islander boys into the school as far back as 1965. In 2007, the school opened a co-educational Kindergarten to Year 6 school for Aboriginal and Torres Strait Islander students, named "Gawura" (meaning "whale"), located in the Junior School and on the rooftop of St Andrew's House campus. During the planning stage, the school searched twelve sites in the Redfern area to build the Gawura campus, but, facing opposition from some members of the Redfern community, it was decided the school should be set up within St Andrew's House. Gawura is Australia's first independent campus for Aboriginal children.

Students at Gawura study Wiradjuri language, an Aboriginal language, culture and NESA numeracy and literacy skills. All students are sponsored primarily by individual and family donors, corporates and foundations. Gawura was established in response to the disparity in educational outcomes of Indigenous and non-Indigenous children. Initially a part of St Andrew's Cathedral School, Gawura became a school in its own right in 2011.

Gawura offers full scholarships to local Aboriginal and Torres Strait Islander children who live at home with their families.

== House system ==
St Andrew's Cathedral School contains eight houses, each named after an English cathedral or abbey with a choir school. The houses are:

- Canterbury
- Durham
- Hereford
- St Paul's
- Salisbury
- Westminster
- Winchester
- York

The houses compete for the Dean Pitt Shield, awarded annually.

== Cathedral choir ==
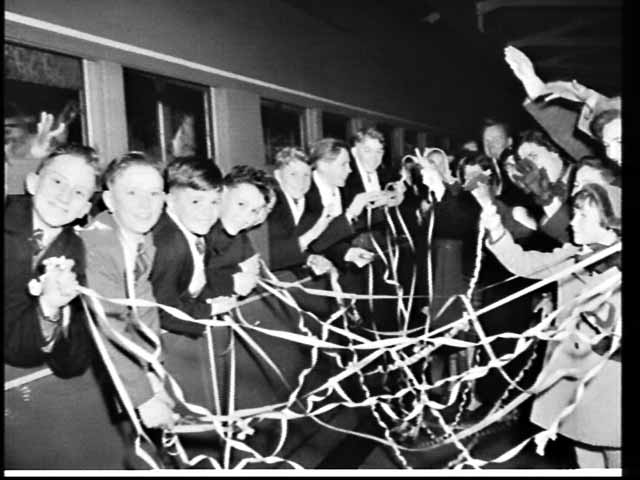
St. Andrew's Cathedral School Choir leaves by train for Melbourne, Central Station, 1954.

The Cathedral Choir can trace its origins to the consecration of St. Andrew's Cathedral in 1868 and this establishes the choir as one of the oldest continuously active choirs in Australia. The choir comprises choristers and choral scholars from St Andrew's Cathedral School as well as a group of men, known as lay clerks, who sing the lower parts.

Through overseas tours and recordings St Andrew's Cathedral Choir has won an international reputation and has accepted invitations to deputise for the resident choirs in such places as St Paul's Cathedral, London, York Minster and many other important centres of Anglican worship. In 2002 the choristers appeared before HM the Queen at a Golden Jubilee concert in St. George's Chapel, Windsor Castle and also made a significant contribution to the ANZAC Day service in Westminster Abbey.

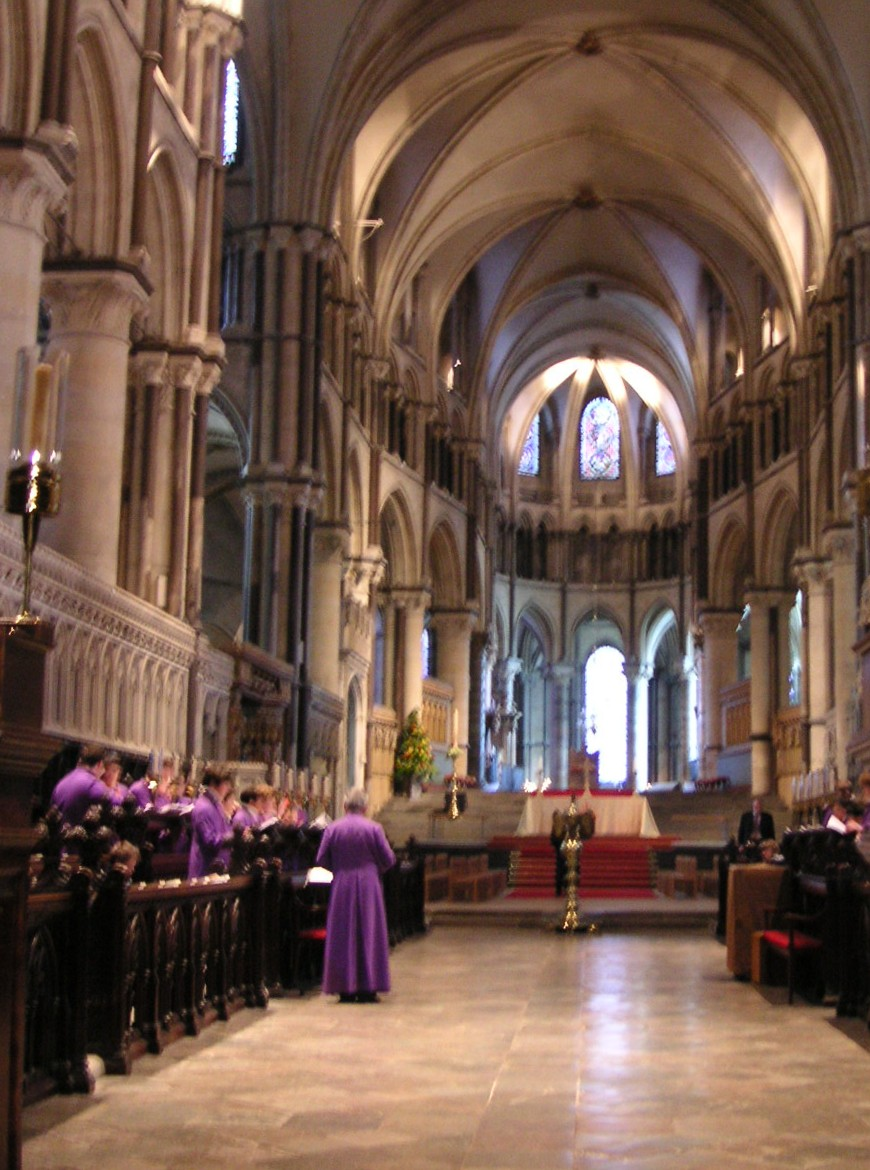
St Andrew's Cathedral choir rehearsing while on tour, at Canterbury Cathedral in 2005

The Cathedral Choir has made several recordings.

During school terms the choir sings at the morning Sunday service at 10.30am and at Evensong on Thursdays at 5.30pm.

Michael Deasey completed a 24-year stint as the School's Master of the Choristers in 2005, and Ross Cobb, from the UK, was appointed as his successor.

To celebrate 140 years of the Cathedral Choir, the choir went on tour to England and Italy in July 2008. The first tour under the direction of Ross Cobb, the 11th organist and choirmaster of St Andrew's, the choir was invited to sing at services and concerts in some of Europe's most historic and significant buildings, including Wells Cathedral, Dedham and Harwich Parish Churches, Bath Abbey, Bristol Cathedral, All Soul's Langham Place, Christ Church Clifton, the Anglican churches of Venice and Florence, St Paul's Cathedral London and, for the first time, the Basilica of San Marco in Venice.

== Co-curricular ==
=== Sport ===
The school has a compulsory winter sports program. Middle School and Senior College students can choose from over 20 different sports and activities ranging from rugby, netball, football and hockey to fencing, cross-country running, chess and ping pong. In summer, students compete in swimming, athletics, basketball, softball, water polo and cricket in the ISA competition. From 2014, the school also offers dance as a co-curricular activity at the school. The school also participates in a large number of sporting events not only within the school but also against other schools statewide, and occasionally outside the state.

=== Performing arts ===
St Andrew's provides extra-curricular opportunities in music, drama and performing arts.

Alongside its music curriculum, the school supports musical ensembles, student orchestral performances and domestic and international choral tours including to Europe, the United States and Asia. Extra-curricular drama activities include Senior and Middle School drama ensemble productions, an Old Andrean annual play, Theatresports and a weekly Year 7 Drama Club. The school has dedicated drama and performance spaces and a Black Box Theatre.

St Andrew's also has a lengthy history in musical production. The first whole of school musical was Oliver!, performed in 2001. Since then, a whole school musical production has been produced at least every two years (with the exception of 2019-2022 due to the COVID-19 pandemic). These have included:

- West Side Story (2003), performed at Sydney's Footbridge Theatre
- Godspell (2005), performed in St. Andrew's Cathedral
- Gilbert and Sullivan's The Pirates of Penzance (2006), performed at the Seymour Centre at the University of Sydney
- Les Misérables (2007), in the Chapter House adjoining St. Andrew's Cathedral
- Guys and Dolls (2008) performed at the Seymour Centre at the University of Sydney
- Paris (2009), performed at the Seymour Centre
- Children of Eden (2011), performed at NIDA's Parade Theatre
- Beauty and the Beast (2013), performed at NIDA's Parade Theatre
- Peter Pan (2015), performed at Chatswood's Concourse Theatre
- The Wizard of Oz (2017), performed at NIDA's Parade Theatre
- Fiddler on the Roof (2019), performed at NIDA's Parade Theatre
- Annie (2022), performed at The Concourse Theatre, Chatswood
- Disney’s The Little Mermaid (2024), performed at The Concourse Theatre, Chatswood

=== Outdoor education ===
St Andrew's offers an outdoor education program that includes year-group-based camping expeditions and outdoor activities. The school owns a property named Kirrikee, south-west of Sydney near Penrose, where the majority of their in-school outdoor education expeditions are conducted.

The school also offers more challenging optional overseas expeditions for older students. The Duke of Edinburgh's Award Scheme is offered to all students in Year 9 and above.

=== Mock trial ===
St Andrew's has had considerable success in the Mock Trial Competition, organised and operated by the Law Society of New South Wales, in which both government and independent schools throughout NSW participate. In 2004, the team were runners-up to Mereweather High School. In 2005, the school team of Year 11 students won the competition and then went on to compete in an International Mock Trial Competition against the UK National Mock Trial team, Ysgol Tre-Gib, Cardiff, United Kingdom, and once again was victorious.

== Incidents ==
In early 1970 three choir boys reported persistent sexual abuse by assistant organist and lay clerk Alan Moffat. All were interviewed by headmaster Canon Melville Newth and another teacher, Alan Beavis who succeeded Newth as headmaster in 1979. These crimes were not reported to police or even the boys’ parents.

Newth simply directed Moffat not to have any further contact with choir boys and allowed him to remain in his current positions. Unsurprisingly, the abuse continued, not only involving the initial three boys, but many others as well. Moffat left St Andrews of his own volition in 1982, three years after Alan Beavis became headmaster. He also abused boys in positions he held as organist and choirmaster after leaving St Andrews.

Adult survivors of child sexual abuse find it disrespectful and sometimes retraumatising when those who could have prevented abuse are honoured years later. An appeal to the school in 2018 by an adult survivor resulted in the renaming of an auditorium previously named in Canon Newth’s honour.

In May 2015, former school mathematics teacher Robert Emmett was convicted on his guilty plea of possessing child abuse material and of aggravated filming of the private parts of a child under the age of 16 in 2013, for which he received an Intensive Corrections Order, a form of non-custodial sentence.

In 2018, the headteacher, John Collier, wrote to parents to tell them not to behave aggressively to staff. He said that he had observed "'a reptilian kind of defensive response'" in parents when their children were told off. He suggested parents were lacking in perspective: "'These matters are often a small discipline issue or a bad grade but these parents represent that issue as the end of the world to their child'".

In November 2019, the female students of Year 12 were told to stay behind after a grade meeting. John Collier (then Headmaster) stated this was to address 'issues with uniform compliance.' Social media posts from the students state that they were told to kneel onto the floor to ensure the correct length of their skirts. Dr Collier (who was absent in the uniform check) denied this, stating that 'one staff member knelt on the ground to show the girls how they could test the length of their skirts, with some students copying the staff member.' Dr Collier states that he had received emails both in support and disapproval of the uniform check. Due to the backlash received from this situation, Dr Collier issued an apology to the students and parents involved.

On 25 October 2023, the body of a woman was found in the toilet of the school's gymnasium by police before midnight. The woman was identified to be the dance and water polo coach, Lilie James. The suspect, Paul Thijssen, was found dead in The Gap in Vaucluse, 11 km away from the initial crime scene. A make-shift memorial was made in front of the school as a tribute to James. The gymnasium was closed to students and the school's library was turned into a drop-in counselling centre. Assessments were either postponed or cancelled with students eligible for special consideration before exams.

== Old Andreans ==
The Old Andreans' Association (OAA), which is the alumni organisation of St Andrew's Cathedral School, was established as the Old Boys' Union (OBU) by the school's third Headmaster, Percy Simpson, in 1906. The first president was the Hon Justice Webb, a judge of the Industrial Relations Commission of NSW. He held office for over 40 years.

Past and present members of the OAA (and OBU) include Sir Charles Kingsford Smith, Ken Tribe AC, Lt-Gen John Grey AC, Simon Tedeschi, John Antill, Julian Hamilton, Malcolm Page and Matt Levy.

=== Notable alumni ===
==== Aviation ====
- Sir Charles Kingsford Smith – pioneering aviator

==== Entertainment, media and the arts ====
- John Antill OBE – composer
- Rebecca Breeds – actress
- Nicholas Gledhill – film and stage actor
- Andrew Goodwin – international operatic tenor
- Julian Hamilton – one half of dance/electro duo The Presets
- Tim Harding – television identity and musician
- Stuart Skelton – operatic tenor
- Freya Leach – right wing political commentator and media personality
- Simon Tedeschi – pianist
- Professor Barry Tuckwell AC, OBE – musician (horn)

==== Politics, public service and the law ====
- Jim Longley – former NSW Minister for Community Services, Minister for Aboriginal Affairs, and Minister for the Ageing (1993–1995)
- Richard Murden – Member of the NSW Legislative Assembly (Lib) (1953–1959)

==== Sports ====
- Matt Levy – Australian Paralympian swimmer
- Rod Macqueen – former Wallabies coach
- Abigail Paduch – judoka
- Malcolm Page – two-time Olympic gold medalist in sailing in the men's double-handed dinghy 470 in 2008 and 2012; flag-bearer for the 2012 London Olympics closing ceremony
- Warwick Selvey – Australian shot put and discus champion, Olympic athlete (1960, 1964), won the discus event at the 1962 Commonwealth Games in Perth
- Chelsea Pitman – netballer

== See also ==
- List of Anglican schools in New South Wales
- Anglican education in Australia
