= Stuart Babbage =

New Zealand Anglican priest

The Reverend Stuart Babbage AM
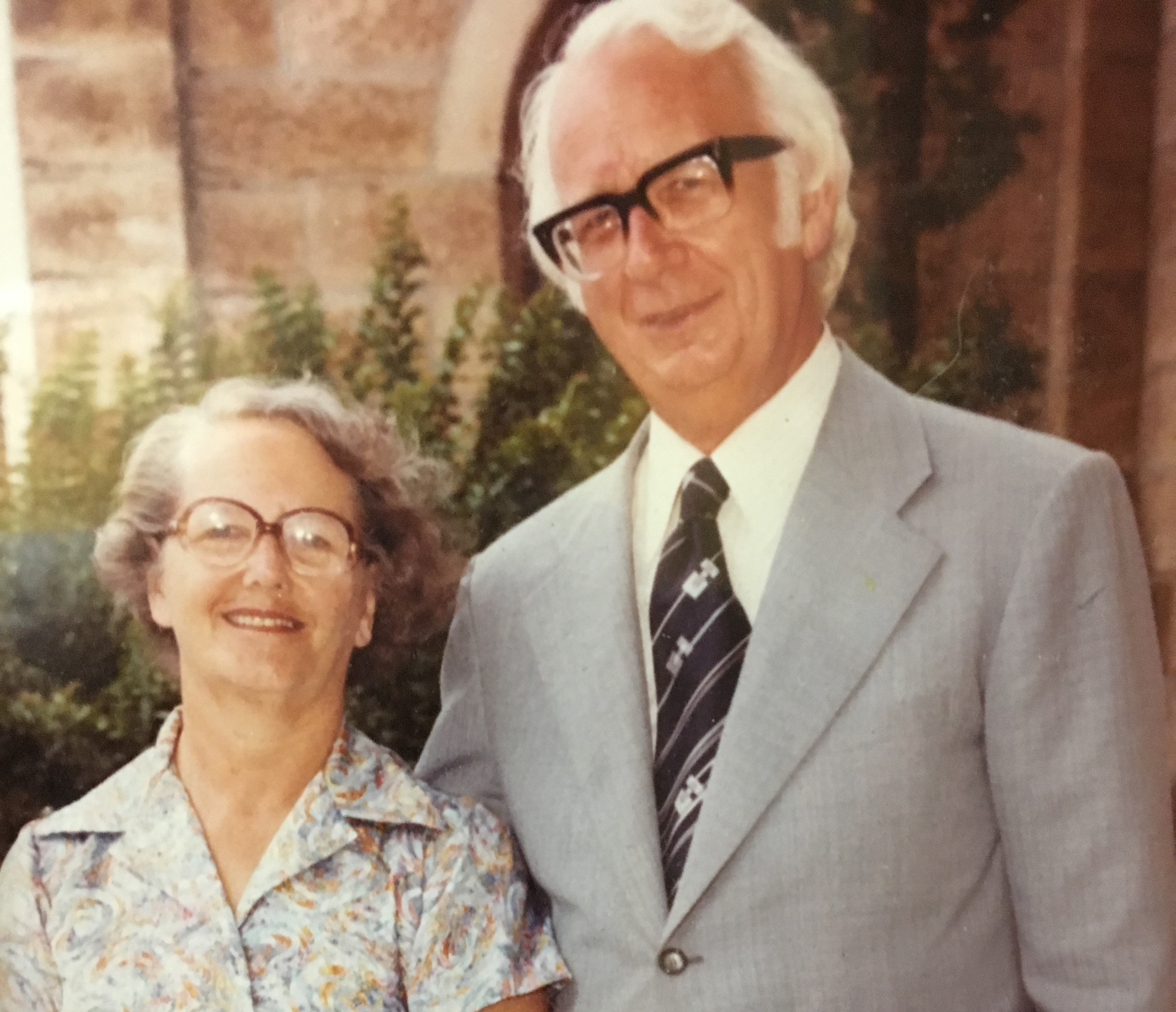
- Babbage and his wife, Elizabeth, in Sydney (1973)
- Born: Stuart Barton Babbage; 4 January 1916; Auckland, New Zealand
- Died: 16 November 2012 (aged 96); Sydney
- Resting place: St Jude's Church, Randwick, Sydney
- Citizenship: Australian
- Education: University of Auckland (MA, 1936); King's College London (PhD, 1940)
- Occupations: Priest; Author; professor
- Spouse: Elizabeth Babbage (m. 1943; died 1984)
- Children: 4 (Veronica, Malcolm, Christopher, Timothy)
- Parents: Gordon Babbage (father); Florence Rutherford (mother)
- Relatives: Charles Babbage
- Known for: Founder of Gordon-Conwell Theological Seminary; Dean of St Paul's Cathedral, Melbourne

Ecclesiastical career
- Religion: Christianity
- Church: Anglican
- Ordained: December 1939

Stuart Barton Babbage AM (4 January 1916 – 16 November 2012), often S. Barton Babbage, was an Anglican priest.

Babbage was educated at Auckland Grammar School, the University of Auckland and King's College London. He was ordained on 17 December 1939, in Essex and his first post was as a curate at Havering-atte-Bower. Then he was a chaplain in the RAF from 1942 to 1946. Returning to Australia he became Dean of Sydney from 1947 to 1953; and then Melbourne from 1953 until 1962.

Babbage also served in theological education for which he was awarded the Order of Australia as a part of the 1995 Queen's Birthday honours list. He lectured at Moore Theological College while he was Dean of Sydney, and served as principal of Ridley College (Melbourne) while he was Dean of Melbourne. He moved to the United States to become one of the founders of Gordon–Conwell Theological Seminary before returning once more to Australia to become master of New College at the University of New South Wales. At the same time he served as Registrar of the Australian College of Theology, from 1973-1991.

== Family ==
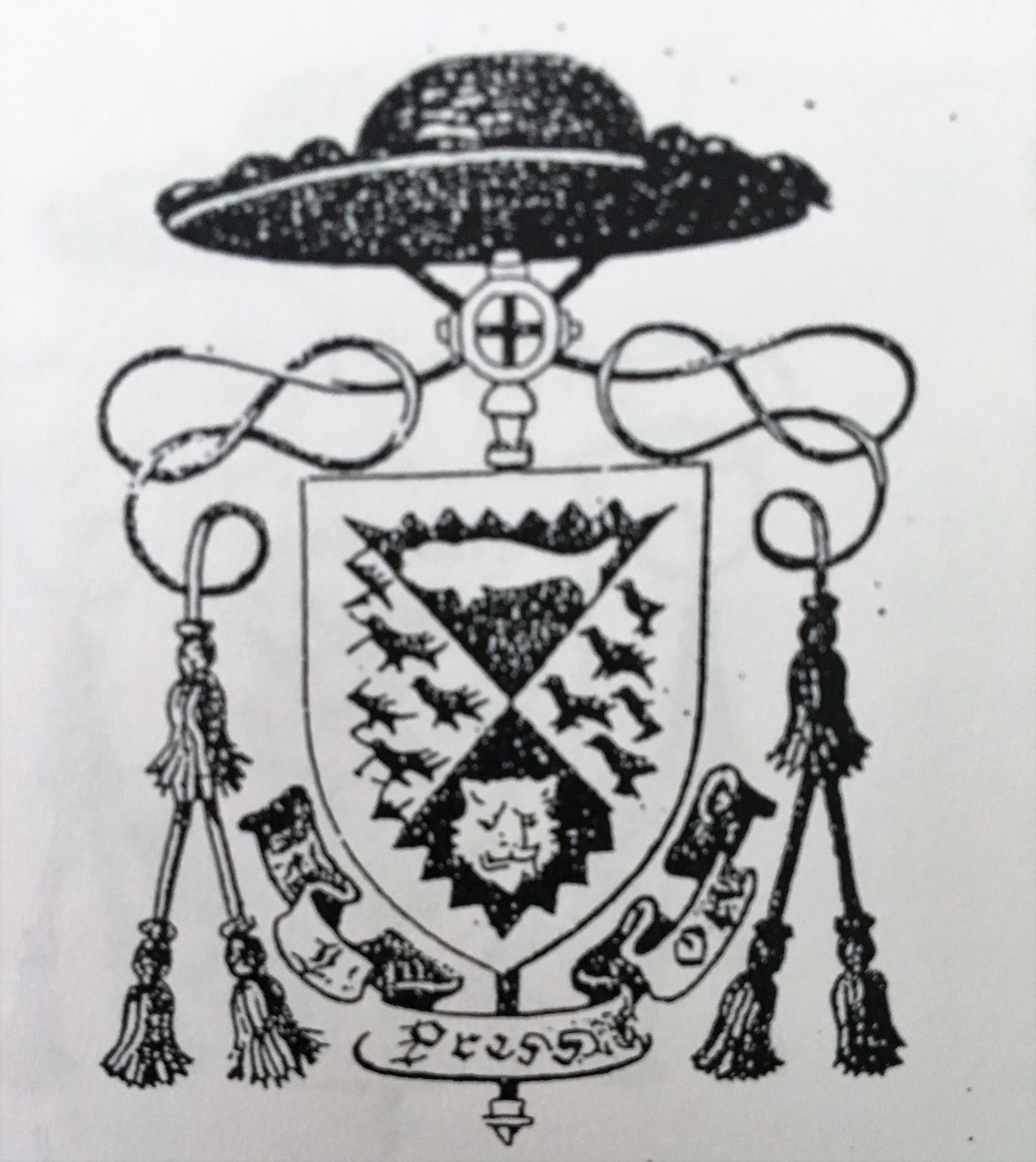
Babbage family crest (registered in Scotland)

Stuart Babbage was born in Auckland, New Zealand, the eldest of six, to Gordon Swaine and Florence (née Rutherfurd) on 4 January 1916. His family tree has been traced back to Charles Babbage (1791–1871), an English polymath credited with inventing the first computer. Babbage's grandfather, Charles Whitmore Babbage, took the family to New Zealand where Gordon Babbage was born. His uncle, Eden Herschel Babbage (1844–1924), was considered the "father of Roseville," of which Babbage Road in Roseville is named, and served as manager of the Bank of Australasia.

== Career ==
After a troubled youth, Babbage earned a master's degree by the age of 20 before travelling to London to pursue his PhD in theology at King's College, London, England. His thesis was on the Puritan movement. While serving as a chaplain in Feltwell, Norfolk with the RAF, Babbage met and married RAF flight officer Janet Elizabeth King in 1943. The couple had four children, Veronica, Malcolm, Christopher, and Timothy. The family, minus Veronica, travelled to Atlanta, Georgia, in 1963, to participate in the American Civil Rights Movement, befriending and working with Reverend Martin Luther King Jr. Babbage became a professor at Columbia Theological Seminary in Decatur, Georgia, at the invitation of J. McDowell Richards, then president of the college from 1932 to 1971. He served as vicar in an African-American church in Atlanta. Babbage, along with other clergy, integrated "white only" churches and public parks in the 1960s. He started after school clubs for young black children in low income neighbourhoods. Eventually, Babbage moved to Pennsylvania and Massachusetts to help found the multi-racial Gordon-Conwell Theological Seminary.

Babbage died in Sydney on 16 November 2012, survived by eight grandchildren, 15 great-grandchildren and two great-great-grandchildren.

== Opinions ==
Babbage considered himself an Anglican evangelist, welcoming Billy Graham to Australia in 1959 as executive chairman of the Melbourne Billy Graham Crusade.

He wrote seven books, including a biography Memoirs of a Loose Canon.

Babbage lectured throughout New South Wales on controversial topics at the time, including in opposition to divorce, stating "It is the simplest thing in the world to take out an order for restitution of conjugal rights, and, on this being ignored, to secure a divorce on the grounds of desertion. This encourages divorce by collusion".

Religious titles
Preceded by Vacant	Dean of Sydney; 1947–1953	Succeeded by Eric Arthur Pitt
Preceded by Alfred Roscoe Wilson	Dean of Melbourne; 1953–1962	Succeeded by Tom William Thomas
