= List of Old Scotch Collegians =

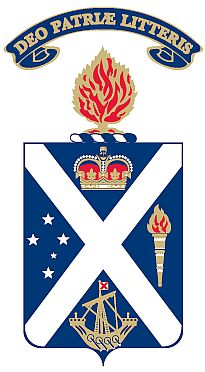

Old Scotch Collegians Association logo

This is a list of Old Scotch Collegians, who are notable former students of Scotch College in Melbourne, Victoria, Australia.

Alumni of Scotch College are known as Old Boys or Old Collegians, and automatically become members of the schools alumni association, the Old Scotch Collegians Association (OSCA).

Scotch College has had more alumni mentioned in Who's Who in Australia (a listing of notable Australians) than any other school, and its alumni have received more top (Companion) Order of Australia honours than any other school. Although knighthoods are no longer bestowed in Australia, at least 71 Scotch College alumni have been knighted.

== Viceroys ==
- Sir Zelman Cowen – Governor General of Australia
- Peter Hollingworth – Governor General of Australia
- Sir Ninian Stephen – Governor General of Australia and Justice of the High Court of Australia
- Sir Henry Winneke – Governor of Victoria and Chief Justice of the Supreme Court of Victoria

== Academia and science ==
=== Eponyms of universities ===
- Sir John Monash – after whom Monash University is named
- Sir Walter Murdoch – after whom Murdoch University is named

=== Chancellors and Vice-Chancellors ===
- Sir Zelman Cowen – Vice Chancellor of University of New England, Vice-Chancellor of University of Queensland
- Peter Darvall – Vice-Chancellor of Monash University
- Sir Arthur Dean – Chancellor of the University of Melbourne
- Sir David Derham – Vice-Chancellor of the University of Melbourne
- Sir Archibald Glenn – Chancellor of La Trobe University
- Raymond Martin – Vice-Chancellor of Monash University
- Sir John Monash – Vice-Chancellor of University of Melbourne, Monash University named after him
- Sir Walter Murdoch – Chancellor and Vice-Chancellor of University of Western Australia, Murdoch University named after him
- Sir George Paton – Vice-Chancellor of the University of Melbourne
- David Penington – Vice-Chancellor of the University of Melbourne
- Ian Renard – Chancellor of the University of Melbourne
- Sir Lindsay Ride – Vice Chancellor of the University of Hong Kong
- Sir Kenneth Wheare – Vice-Chancellor of Oxford University

=== Members of the Royal Society ===
- Sir Thomas Cherry
- Richard Dalitz
- Sir Neil Hamilton Fairley
- Alan Head
- Andrew Holmes
- John Philip
- John Spence

=== Others – academia and science ===
- Robert Bartnik – mathematician
- John Cade – discovered lithium carbonate as a mood stabilizer in the treatment of depression
- Robert Percival Cook FRSE – nutrition expert and Professor of Biochemistry, University of Dundee
- Rev. Dr Andrew Harper – Biblical scholar and Principal of the Presbyterian Ladies' College, Melbourne and St Andrew's College, Sydney
- Ian Johnston – IVF and reproductive medicine pioneer
- Hugh Gemmell Lamb-Smith – Australian educator who, as a member of the Second Field Ambulance, landed at Anzac Cove on 25 April 1915
- James P. Leary – Professor of Folklore and Scandinavian Studies University of Wisconsin–Madison
- Noel Lothian – botanist and director of the Adelaide Botanic Garden, 1948–1980; oversaw the garden's expansion to three sites in South Australia
- Stuart Macintyre – Dean of Arts at the University of Melbourne, Chair of Australian Studies at Harvard University, voted one of Australia's leading public intellectuals
- Sir William Colin Mackenzie – anatomist, museum administrator, best known for creating Healesville Sanctuary
- Robert Marks – editor of the Australian Journal of Management, Emeritus Professor at Australian Graduate School of Management
- Dr. E. Neil McQueen – second Principal of the Presbyterian Ladies' College, Sydney
- Stephen Newton – Principal of Caulfield Grammar School
- Sydney Patterson – first Director of WEHI, Australia's oldest medical research institute
- Alan Geoffrey Serle – historian and biographer
- James Simpson – Douglas P. and Katherine B. Loker Professor of English at Harvard University
- Peter Singer – philosopher, Professor of Bioethics at Princeton University, voted one of Australia's leading public intellectuals
- Thomas Gibson Sloane – entomologist
- Hugh Stretton – social scientist, voted one of Australia's leading public intellectuals
- Sir Sydney Sunderland – scientist and academic in the field of medicine
- David Vines – Professor of Economics at Oxford University
- Sir Ian Wark – chemist and science administrator

== Business ==
- Sir James Balderstone – Chairman of BHP and AMP
- David Crawford – Chairman Foster's Group and Lendlease
- Sir Archibald Glenn – Chairman of Imperial Chemical Industries Australia
- Charles Goode – Chairman of ANZ Bank and Woodside Energy
- Sir Lenox Hewitt – Chairman of Qantas
- Sir Harold Knight – Governor of the Reserve Bank of Australia
- Jonathan Ling – CEO of Fletcher Building
- Sir Ian McLennan – Chairman of BHP and ANZ Bank
- Sir Laurie Muir – stockbroker and director
- Lionel Robinson – financier in Australia and England
- Robert Somervaille – Chairman of the Australian Broadcasting Corporation, Chairman of the Australian Telecommunications Commission and Overseas Telecommunications Commission, which he merged to become Telstra, founding Director of Hill Samuel
- Hugh Syme – proprietor of The Age newspaper
- Evan Thornley – founder of Looksmart, Chief Executive of Better Place Australia
- Sir David Zeidler – Chairman of Imperial Chemical Industries Australia

== Law ==
=== Chief justices ===
- Will Alstergren – Chief Justice of the Family Court of Australia
- Sir John Latham – Chief Justice of the High Court of Australia, Deputy Prime Minister of Australia
- Alastair Nicholson – Chief Justice of the Family Court of Australia
- Sir Henry Winneke – Chief Justice of the Supreme Court of Victoria and Governor of Victoria

=== High Court Justices ===
- Kenneth Hayne – Justice of the High Court of Australia
- Sir John Latham – Chief Justice of the High Court of Australia, Deputy Prime Minister of Australia
- Sir Hayden Starke – Justice of the High Court of Australia
- Sir Ninian Stephen – Justice of the High Court of Australia and Governor General of Australia

=== Supreme Court Justices ===
- Peter Buchanan – Justice of the Supreme Court of Victoria
- Sir Arthur Dean – Justice of the Supreme Court of Victoria and Chancellor of the University of Melbourne
- Geoff Digby – Justice of the Supreme Court of Victoria
- Greg Garde – Justice of the Supreme Court of Victoria, President of Victorian Civil and Administrative Tribunal
- Sir Joseph Hood – Justice of the Supreme Court of Victoria
- Stephen Kaye – Justice of the Supreme Court of Victoria
- William Kaye – Justice of the Supreme Court of Victoria
- Clifford Menhennitt – Justice of the Supreme Court of Victoria, delivered the landmark 1969 Menhennitt ruling which was the first legal precedent with regard to abortion law in Australia
- John Phillips – Justice of the Supreme Court of Victoria
- Richard Refshauge – Justice of the Supreme Court of the Australian Capital Territory
- Sir Henry Winneke – Chief Justice of the Supreme Court of Victoria and Governor of Victoria
- John Winneke (son of Sir Henry) – Justice of the Supreme Court of Victoria, President of Victorian Court of Appeal

== Media, entertainment, culture and the arts ==
- Graeme Bell – jazz musician
- Ric Birch – designer of Olympic Games opening and closing ceremonies
- Creighton Burns – editor of The Age newspaper 1981–1989
- Richard Davies – actor
- John Ewart – AFI award-winning actor
- Alexander Frater – writer and chief travel correspondent, The Observer
- Sir Roy Grounds – architect, works include National Gallery of Victoria and Victorian Arts Centre
- Russel Howcroft – 3AW radio presenter, ABC TV panellist, businessman
- Alistair Knox – mudbrick house designer, builder and landscape architect
- Mark Kwong – music producer and DJ known as Maarcos
- Patrick McCaughey – director of the National Gallery of Victoria
- Nick McCallum – television and radio journalist
- Campbell McComas – entertainer, impersonator
- Will McMahon – radio show host
- Ian Munro – pianist, composer
- Ned Napier – actor
- Peter Nicholson – cartoonist for The Australian
- Chris Pang – actor
- Andrew Probyn – journalist
- Ron Radford – director of the National Gallery of Australia
- Felix Riebl – lead singer of The Cat Empire
- Jesse Spencer – actor
- Walter J. Turner – writer and poet
- Chris Wallace-Crabbe – poet, Emeritus Professor in The Australian Centre at the University of Melbourne
- John Williamson – country music singer
- Woody Whitelaw- radio show host
- Michael Wipfli – radio presenter and comedian
- Yelian He – cellist

== Military and intelligence ==
=== Chiefs / heads of services ===
- Sir Julius Bruche – Chief of the General Staff
- Barry Gration – Chief of the Air Staff
- Peter Gration – Chief of the Australian Defence Force
- Sir Alan McNicoll – Chief of the Royal Australian Navy
- Sir John Monash – first Australian overall Commander of the Australian Corps, face on Australian $100 note, Monash University named after him
- Paul Symon – director-General of the Australian Secret Intelligence Service, Deputy Chief of Army

=== Others – military ===
- Raymond Brownell – Air Commodore, WWI flying ace
- Sir Neil Hamilton Fairley – Brigadier, Director of Medicine, Australian Military Forces during WWII
- Greg Garde – Major General, Deputy Chief Australian Defence Force (Reserves) (Australia's highest ranking reservist)
- Oliver David Jackson – Commander 1st Australian Task Force in South Vietnam (1966–1967)
- Robert Little – top scoring Australian fighter pilot in WWI, killed in action May 1918
- Sir James McCay – Lieutenant General
- Rev. Alexander Rowan Macneil - twice awarded the Military Cross in WW1, he was Presbyterian chaplain to the PoWs interred at Changi Prison during WW2 and established Rover Scouting in the Japanese PoW camp system.
- Sir William Refshauge – Major General
- Sir Lindsay Ride – Commander, Hong Kong Volunteer Defence Corps Field Ambulance (1941); Commander, British Army Aid Group (1942-1945); Commandant, Royal Hong Kong Defence Force (1949-1967)
- Robert Smith – Brigadier General, WWI, Commander 5th Brigade
- Sir Clive Steele – Major General
- Alan Stretton – Major General, Head of National Disaster Organisation, responsible for managing and rebuilding Darwin after Cyclone Tracy
- Hugh Randall Syme – bomb defuser, grandson of David Syme
- Ian Upjohn – Lieutenant Colonel, Commanding Officer of 4th/19th Prince of Wales's Light Horse, commander of Australian troops in Solomon Islands

== Politics and public service ==
=== Prime ministers and presidents ===
- Sir John Latham – Deputy Prime Minister of Australia
- Kalkot Mataskelekele – President of Vanuatu
- Sir George Houston Reid – Prime Minister of Australia, Premier of NSW, member of British House of Commons

=== Premiers ===
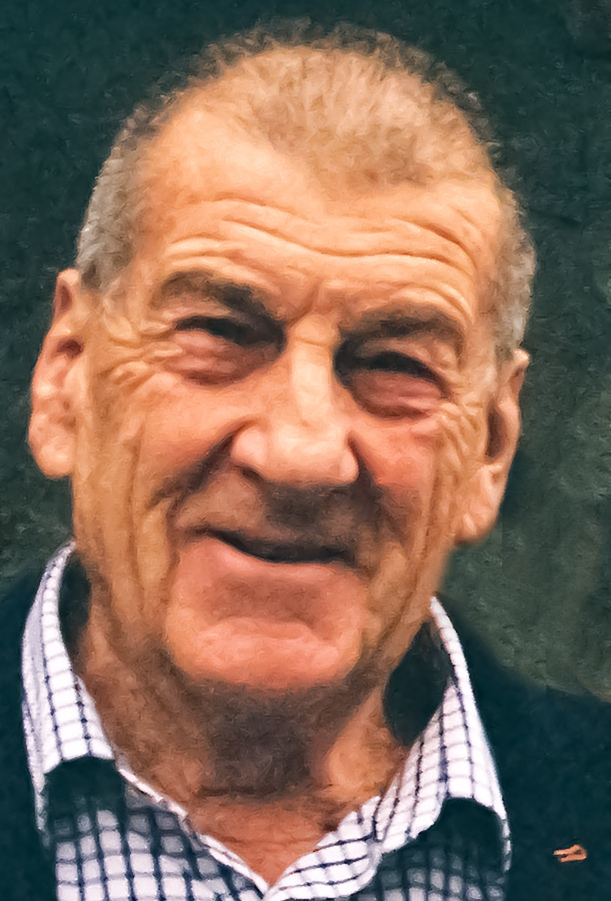
Former Victorian Premier Jeff Kennett

- Jim Bacon – Premier of Tasmania
- John Cain – Premier of Victoria
- Jeff Kennett – Premier of Victoria
- Sir Harry Lawson – Premier of Victoria
- John MacPherson – Premier of Victoria
- Sir George Houston Reid – Premier of NSW
- William Shiels – Premier of Victoria
- Vaiben Louis Solomon – Premier of South Australia

=== Cabinet ministers ===
- Bill Baxter – Victorian Nationals Roads & Ports Minister
- Sir Gilbert Chandler – Victorian Cabinet Minister
- Henry Cohen – Victorian Cabinet Minister
- Mark Dreyfus – Federal Attorney General
- Andrew Giles – Federal Minister for Immigration, Citizenship, Migrant Services and Multicultural Affairs
- Ivor Greenwood – Federal Liberal Minister
- Mac Holten – Federal Nationals Minister, Administrator of Christmas Island
- Dr David Kemp – Federal Liberal Minister
- Rod Kemp – Federal Liberal Minister
- Jim Kennan – Victorian Attorney General, Victorian Labor Opposition Leader
- Sir James Kennedy – Victorian Cabinet Minister
- Sir John Latham – Deputy Prime Minister of Australia, Chief Justice of the High Court of Australia
- John Leckie – Federal Minister
- Sir James Whiteside McCay – Federal Defence Minister
- James McColl – Federal Minister
- Andrew Peacock – Federal Liberal Opposition Leader, Ambassador to United States
- Jim Ramsay – Victorian Cabinet Minister
- Andrew Refshauge – Labor Deputy Premier of New South Wales
- Sir George Oswald Reid – Victorian Cabinet Minister, Attorney General
- Sir Arthur Robinson – Victorian Attorney General
- Tony Staley – Federal Liberal Minister, Federal President of the Liberal Party of Australia
- Haddon Storey – Victorian Cabinet Minister
- George Wise – Federal Minister, Postmaster-General
- Michael Wooldridge – Federal Liberal Health Minister

=== Others – politics and public service ===
- John Arthur Andrews – anarchist theoretician, agitator, poet, journalist
- Norman Bayles – Member of Victorian Parliament
- Alexander Buchanan – Member of Australian Parliament
- James Dunn – Member of Victorian Parliament
- James Gibb – Member of Australian Parliament
- Robert Bell Hamilton – renowned Victorian architect, Member for Toorak in Parliament of Victoria and Mornington Shire Council President
- Norman Charles Harris – engineer, later lieutenant colonel, Victorian Railways Chairman of Commissioners, honoured by the naming of Melbourne Suburban blue electric 'Harris Train'
- Sir Lenox Hewitt – senior public servant
- James Gordon Hislop – Member of Western Australian Parliament
- Robert Holt – Member of Victorian Parliament, Member of Australian Parliament
- Ken Jasper – veteran Nationals member for Murray Valley in Parliament of Victoria
- Sir George Knox – Speaker of Victorian Legislative Assembly, City of Knox named after him
- William Knox – Federal Member of Parliament, responsible for moving a motion to begin each sitting day of parliament with prayers
- Charles Hector McFadyen – Secretary, Department of Shipping and Transport 1948–57
- Tich McFarlane – senior positions in the Commonwealth Public Service and statutory bodies
- Sir William Refshauge – Director-General of the Commonwealth Department of Health 1960–73
- Charles Carty Salmon – Member of Australian Parliament, Speaker of House of Representatives
- Sir David Smith – official Secretary to five Australian Governors-General 1973–1990
- Sir Keith Waller – public servant and diplomat

== Sport ==
=== American football ===
- Tom Hackett – punter for the University of Utah Football Team; two time recipient of the Ray Guy Award and member of the Pac-12 All-Century football team

=== Athletics ===
- Craig Hilliard – head coach of the Australian Athletics Team
- Cameron Mackenzie – Olympic sprinter

=== Australian rules football ===
- Ed Barlow – Sydney Swans Football Club player
- Jack Billings – St. Kilda Football Club player, pick no.3 2013 National NAB AFL Draft
- Will Brodie – Gold Coast Football Club and Fremantle Football Club player
- Campbell Brown – 2008 Premiership player for Hawthorn Football Club; Gold Coast Suns player
- Darcy Byrne-Jones – Port Adelaide Football Club player
- Sam Darcy-Western Bulldogs player
- Nathan Djerrkura – Geelong Football Club player
- Andrew Erickson – Sydney Swans Football Club player
- Joel Garner – Port Adelaide Football Club player
- Nick Gill – Adelaide Football Club player
- Duncan Harris – Hawthorn FC, 1 game, 1962
- Bob Hay – Fitzroy Football Club player
- John McKenzie Hay – Collingwood Football Club player
- John Hendrie – 1976 & 1978 Premiership Player for Hawthorn Football Club
- Doug Heywood – Melbourne Football Club player
- Malcolm Hill – Hawthorn FC, 22 games, 1960–1962 including 1961 Premiership
- Aidyn Johnson – Port Adelaide Football Club player
- Liam Jones – Western Bulldogs Football Club player
- Jake Kelly – Adelaide Football Club player
- Will Kelly – Collingwood Football Club player
- Ian Law – Hawthorn FC – 106 games – 1960–1969 including 1961 Premiership
- Jake Long – Essendon Football Club Player
- Cooper Lord – Carlton Football Club Player
- Richard Loveridge – 1983 & 1986 Premiership Player for Hawthorn Football Club
- Jamie Macmillan – North Melbourne Football Club player
- Finn Maginness – Hawthorn Football Club player
- Scott Maginness – 1988 & 1989 Premiership player for Hawthorn Football Club
- Will Maginness – West Coast Football Club player
- Alex McCracken – sports administrator, first secretary of the Essendon Football Club and first president of the Victorian Football League
- Reef McInnes
- Bill Morris – Brownlow Medal winner, Richmond Football Club player
- Neil Pearson – Hawthorn FC, 133 games, 1945–1954
- Michael Perry – Richmond Football Club player
- Stan Reid – Fitzroy Football Club player
- Cyril Rioli – 2008, 2013, 2014 and 2015 Premiership player for Hawthorn Football Club
- Maurice Rioli Jr – Richmond Football Club player
- Michael Rix – St Kilda Football Club player
- Jy Simpkin – North Melbourne Football Club player
- Ben Sinclair – Collingwood Football Club player
- Jack Sinclair – St. Kilda Football club player
- Will Slade – Geelong Football Club player
- Jagga Smith- Carlton Football Club player
- Nick Smith – 2012 Premiership player for Sydney Swans Football Club
- James Stewart – Essendon Football Club player
- James Strauss – Melbourne Football Club player
- Jamarra Ugle-Hagan – Western Bulldogs player
- Eddie Toms — Melbourne (VFA), South Melbourne (VFA), and South Melbourne (VFL) player
- Terry Waites – Collingwood Football Club player
- Rupert Wills – Collingwood Football Club player
- John Winneke – Hawthorn Football Club, 50 games, 1960–1962 including 1961 Premiership
- Colin Youren – Hawthorn FC, 135 games, 1958–1965 including 1961 Premiership

=== Cricket ===
- George Alexander – Australian cricket team
- Andrew Fekete – Victoria cricket team
- Colin McDonald – Australian cricket team
- Ray Steele – Treasurer of the Australian Cricket Board, President of the Victorian Cricket Association and AFL premiership footballer
- Will Sutherland – Australian cricket team

=== Motorsport ===
- Bill Patterson – racing driver, won the Australian Grand Prix
- Bib Stillwell – racing driver, won the Australian Drivers' Championship four years consecutively, 1962–1965

=== Rowing ===
- Josh Booth – Olympic silver medalist
- David Boykett – Olympic bronze medalist
- David Douglas – Olympic silver medalist
- Drew Ginn – three time Olympic gold medalist
- Will Lockwood – two time Olympic silver medalist
- Cameron McKenzie-McHarg – Olympic silver medalist
- Samuel Patten – Olympian and member of the Oarsome Foursome

=== Rugby ===
- David Fitter – Australian national rugby union team
- Brett Gosper – CEO of World Rugby
- Richard Harry – Australian national rugby union team
- Ewen McKenzie – head coach of the Australian national rugby union team in which he also played, also head coach of the NSW Waratahs, Stade Français and Queensland Reds
- Andrew Heath - Australian national rugby union team

=== Soccer ===
- Denis Genreau – Australia national soccer team, Melbourne City & PEC Zwolle
- James Meredith – Australia national soccer team

=== Swimming and diving ===
- Dean Pullar – Olympic diving medalist
- Matthew Targett – Olympic swimming silver medalist
- Matt Welsh – Olympic swimming silver medalist
- Rob Woodhouse – Olympic swimming medalist

=== Tennis ===
- Gerald Patterson – two times Wimbledon singles champion and world number 1 tennis player

== See also ==
- List of schools in Victoria
- List of boarding schools
- Associated Public Schools of Victoria

rank	#	Schools
1	19	Scotch College, Melbourne
2	17	Geelong Grammar School
3	13	Sydney Boys High School
=4	10	Fort Street High School, Perth Modern School and St Peter's College, Adelaide
=7	9	Melbourne Grammar School, North Sydney Boys High School and The King's School, Parramatta
=10	6	Launceston Grammar School, Melbourne High School, Wesley College, Melbourne and Xavier College
