= Maarcos =

- Birth name: Mark Kwong
- Origin: Melbourne, Australia
- Genres: Progressive house
- Occupation(s): DJ, remixer, record producer
- Instrument(s): Music sequencer, synthesizers
- Years active: 2004–present
- Labels: Phazing (2011–present); Fuze Records (2014-present)
- Website: maarcos.com fuzerecords.tv

Mark Kwong, better known under his stage name Maarcos, is an Australian DJ, remixer, record producer and record label owner. He was formerly a founding member of the group Those Usual Suspects.

== Biography ==
=== Early life ===
Maarcos was born in Malaysia and moved to Australia when he was a child. He studied at Melbourne private school Scotch College before attending Swinburne University of Technology. He played his first club show at 19 and currently resides in New York.

=== Career ===
In 2004, Maarcos released his first work, a remix for Inaya Day’s track Nasty Girl. The track went on to become #1 in the ARIA Club Charts and #18 in the overall ARIA Charts.

He then formed the group Those Usual Suspects with fellow band-members Wei-Shen Mak and Atridge D’Costa. Their first single ‘Dakka’ was released on Bob Sinclars Yellow Productions and the group became a member of the Africanism All Stars. Their following single ‘Shadows’ peaked at #17 on the Billboard Dance Airplay charts.

As part of Those Usual Suspects, Maarcos also released ‘Walking Alone’, a collaboration with fellow Australian Dirty South on Phazing Records. This track was made ‘Essential New Tune’ by the Swedish House Mafia on their BBC Radio 1 takeover.

As of June 2013, Maarcos had left the group Those Usual Suspects to produce and perform solo. His first single was ‘Blaze’, again on Phazing Records.

On Friday, 11 July 2014 Maarcos announced his new record label Fuze Records. This is a joint venture between Maarcos and Sony Music Australia EDM Director Jon Hanlon. The first single was called ‘Pyro’ and the label will have Maarcos’ releases as well as other artists.

== Discography ==
=== as Maarcos ===
==== Original releases ====
- Blaze (Phazing Records / Sony Music Australia)
- Pyro (Fuze Records)

==== Remixes ====
- Twenty One Pilots - Guns for Hands (Atlantic Records/Warner Music - Fueled By Ramen)
- Style of Eye ft. Soso - Kids (Sony Music / Ultra Music / Basik)
- Helena feat. Shawnee Taylor - Levity (Sony Music / Ultra Music)
- Ellroy Clerk & Russian Nick - Hands Up (Maarcos Edit)(Fuze Records)

=== as Those Usual Suspects ===
==== Original releases ====
- Greece 2000 (Ministry of Sound / Hussle)
- Shadows ft. Abigail Bailey (Ministry of Sound / Nervous Records)
- Dakka (Yellow Productions / Africanism)
- Palazzo (Ministry of Sound / Hussle
- Animalia (Ministry of Sound / Asterix)
- In This Life ft. Chappell (Ministry of Sound / Asterix)
- Feel The Need (Ministry of Sound / Asterix)
- My Star ft. Yota (Computerscience)
- Walking Alone w/ Dirty South ft. Erik Hecht (Phazing Records)
- Can't Hold On ft. Erik Hecht (Onelove)
- Give It To Me ft. Jay Sebag (Onelove)
- Burn Forever w/ Nordean ft. Erik Hecht (Phazing Records)
- Prophet w/ Nordean (Phazing Records)

==== Remixes ====
- Morgan Page & Andy Caldwell ft. Jon Mendelsohn - Where Did You Go (Nettwerk)
- Topher Jones & Amada feat. Ido vs. The World - Hello Chicago (Ultra Music)
- Digital LAB - Frequency (Vicious)
- Bob Sinclar ft. Steve Edwards - Together (Defected Records)
- Kings of Tomorrow feat. Julie McKnight - Finally Defected Records)
- Sgt Slick - Sax Addict (Vicious Vinyl)
- Mark James feat. Hamish - Come With Me (Ministry of Sound)
- The Similou - All This Love (Ministry of Sound)
- GusGus - David (Ministry of Sound)
- Stafford Brothers - Wasted (Ministry of Sound)
- Ou Est Le Swimming Pool - Jacksons Last Stand (Ministry of Sound)
- Inaya Day - Nasty Girl (Wei-Shen and Maarcos Remix) (Vinyl Pusher)
