= Monash University Regiment =

- Monash University Regiment cap badge
- Active: 1966–2013
- Country: Australia
- Branch: Army Reserve
- Type: Training establishment Infantry
- Role: Army Reserve officer training
- Size: Regiment
- Part of: 4th Brigade & Royal Military College, Australia
- Nickname(s): MonUR; Monash
- Motto(s): Ancora Imparo
- March: Imperial Echoes
- Mascot(s): Black Sheep
- Equipment: Weaponry of the Australian Army

Commanders
- Honorary Colonel: Major General Gregory Garde, AO, RFD
- Commanding Officer: Lieutenant Colonel Margaret Sorial

The Monash University Regiment was an officer training regiment of the Australian Army, based in Victoria near Monash University. It was a direct command training unit of the 4th Brigade, and part of the 2nd Division, it was responsible for training of ARes officer cadets (OCDTs) for graduation as lieutenants, and provided driver training and promotion courses for junior non commissioned officers.

The regiment was named in honour of General Sir John Monash, one of Australia's most famous soldiers and arguably one of the most effective commanders on the Western Front during World War I. Its last commanding officer was Lieutenant Colonel Margaret Sorial, and the last honorary colonel was Major General Greg Garde.

== History ==
The regiment, which is known as MONUR (not to be confused with MUR, being Melbourne University Regiment), traces its origins back to 23 April 1966, when Monash University Company was formed as a detachment of MUR. On 23 February 1970 it ceased to be the Monash University Company of MUR, and became a regiment in its own right. As a training unit, MONUR does not carry any battle honours on its colours which are laid up in the Religious Centre on the Clayton campus of Monash University. However, past and present members of the unit have been involved in every major Australian deployment since 1966, with a large number of members assisting in natural disaster relief, including the Black Saturday bushfires.

Since its formation the Regiment enjoyed a loose association with Monash University, with a majority of officer cadets also studying at the university. This relationship has not always proved an easy one, especially during the Vietnam War-era when Monash University's Clayton campus was a hotbed of student activism.

The last commanding officer, Lieutenant Colonel Margaret Sorial.

The last regimental sergeant major, Warrant Officer Class One Christopher Kund.

In 2013, MonUR was amalgamated with Melbourne University Regiment under Plan Beersheba.

== Structure ==
Immediately prior to its removal from the order of battle, the Regiment was structured into a Regimental (Battalion) Headquarters and two sub-units: Cadet Company and Logistic Support Company. Cadet Company contained all the officer cadets undertaking the commissioning course to become commissioned officers in the Australian Army. The Logistic Support Company provided training and logistic support to the Regiment, particularly to the Cadet Company training program in support of the First Appointment Course to train reservists as commissioned officers. Logistic Support Company consisted of a catering cell, a rifle section for demonstration and OPFOR purposes, Q store, a transport section, and administration cell.

Monash University Regiment sent approximately 10 Staff Cadets each to the Royal Military College, Duntroon (RMC-D) each year to complete this part-time officer course, graduates of which were commissioned as lieutenants at Duntroon before being allocated to their Corps and posted to their first unit. For much of the 2000s decade, MONUR came under the command of the Royal Military College of Australia, a brigade-sized formation that included RMC-D and all university regiments in the Australian Army.

== Traditions ==
The regiment's motto is Ancora Imparo which is attributed to Michelangelo and translates as "I am still learning", which is also the university's motto. Members of the Regiment wear an Academic Blue (or Cambridge Blue) lanyard which signifies the unit's link with Monash University, which in turn adopted many of the traditions of Cambridge University. The regimental badge is backed by a red "aura" which signifies the alliance of MONUR with the British Army's Light Infantry, now amalgamated into The Rifles.

MONUR enjoyed a healthy rivalry with its larger counterpart, MUR. All new inductees to the Officer Cadet's Mess (named in honour of Lieutenant David Sabben, MG) were required to denounce any allegiance to the sister unit. The regiment's mascot was a black sheep (ram) indicative of the status and culture of the Regiment as a historical formation within MUR. The unofficial mascot of MONUR's Cadet Company was a comical orange stuffed toy known as "The Muppet", with the worthiest Officer Cadet guarding this revered figure at all times.

MONUR's regimental quick march is "Imperial Echoes", which was composed by Arnold Safroni in 1913 and used as the signature tune of the BBC Newsreel feature during World War II.

== Notable members ==
Former unit members and graduates include:

- Robert Champion de Crespigny (RCDC), businessman and member of the first graduating class
- Peter Carroll, Department of Defence mandarin and member of Cadet Company
- Singer and performer Vanessa Amorosi
- Bill Shorten, leader of the Australian Labor Party, member 1985–1986
