= Gregory Garde =

Australian judge, Australian general

- Born: 1 April 1949 (age 77); Melbourne, Victoria
- Military career
- Allegiance: Australia
- Branch: Australian Army Reserve
- Service years: 1967–2004
- Rank: Major General
- Commands: Chief of Reserves and Head of Reserve Policy (2001–04); 4th Brigade (1993–94); 4th/19th Prince of Wales's Light Horse (1984–86); Monash University Regiment (1982–84)
- Awards: Officer of the Order of Australia; Reserve Force Decoration

Major General Gregory Howard "Greg" Garde, AO, RFD (born 1 April 1949) is a senior Australian lawyer and Army officer. His positions and appointments have included Queen's Counsel, Supreme Court Justice, President of the Victorian Civil and Administrative Tribunal, and membership of various boards of directors.

== Early years ==
Garde was born on 1 April 1949 and attended Scotch College, Melbourne and the University of Melbourne. His father, John Garde, and uncle, Bruce Garde, were both practicing solicitors "for some 50 years".

== Legal career ==
Garde has a Bachelor of Arts (Hons), Bachelor of Laws (Hons) (1972) and Master of Laws (1975). He was appointed a Queen's Counsel in 1989 and a Justice of the Supreme Court of Victoria on 29 May 2012.

He was named President of the Victorian Civil and Administrative Tribunal on 1 June 2012, a position he held until 30 May 2018, when he was succeeded by Justice Michelle Quigley. While President of VCAT, Justice Garde was a member of the Courts Council and the Judicial Commission of Victoria

He has also been elected President of the Council of Australasian Tribunals – Victorian Chapter and a Director of the Judicial College of Victoria.

Justice Garde retired as a Supreme Court justice on 30 March 2019, and was appointed as a reserve judge of the Supreme Court of Victoria on 1 April 2019 for a period of five years.

Garde is the fourth general to become a Victorian judge, and the second general to become a Justice of the Supreme Court of Victoria.

Justice Garde was appointed as the Chair of the Victorian Law Foundation in October 2020.

== Military career ==
Garde joined the Melbourne University Regiment in 1967. After he was commissioned into the Royal Australian Infantry Corps as a lieutenant, he served on a period of full-time duty with the Pacific Islands Regiment in Papua New Guinea. He was later posted to Monash University Regiment in the 1970s. In the 1980s, he was Commanding Officer of Monash University Regiment and later on transferring from the Royal Australian Infantry Corps to the Royal Australian Armoured Corps, he was appointed by the Chief of the General Staff as the Commanding Officer of the 4th/19th Prince of Wales's Light Horse. Following promotion to brigadier he commanded the 4th Brigade and was later appointed as the Director-General Reserves (Army). From 2001 to 2004, as a major general, he served as Chief of Reserves and Head of Reserve Policy, the highest position for a reserve officer in the Australian Defence Force.

He was appointed a Member of the Order of Australia on 26 January 1996, for "exceptional service to the Army Reserve", and Officer of the Order of Australia on 26 January 2005 for "distinguished service to the Australian Defence Force Reserves, in particular as the Assistant Chief of the Defence Force (Reserves) and Head Reserve Policy".

== Civilian career ==
Gregory Garde has been a member of Defence Health in various capacities. Since 2004, he was in its board, became its chairman in 2011, and retired as chair and director in 2019.

== Family ==
Garde's daughter Catherine was a barrister in Western Australia. She is now a corporate solicitor practising in Victoria.
