= Bob Hay (footballer, born 1880) =

Australian rules footballer

Personal information
- Full name: Robert Hay
- Born: 2 March 1880; Ardrossan, Scotland
- Died: 27 December 1959 (aged 79); Melbourne, Victoria
- Original team: Ormond College

Playing career^{1}
Years	Club	Games (Goals)
1899–1901	Fitzroy	9 (1)
- ^{1} Playing statistics correct to the end of 1901.

Robert Hay (2 March 1880 – 27 December 1959) was an Australian rules footballer who played with Fitzroy in the Victorian Football League (VFL).

== Family ==
The son of Presbyterian cleric George Hay (1843-1928), and Elizabeth McKelvie Hay (1847-1926), née McKenzie, Robert Hay was born in Ardrossan, Scotland on 2 March 1880.

His younger brother, John McKenzie Hay (1886–1958), played with Collingwood in the VFL.

He married Alice Anderson Dobie (1889-1944) on 20 December 1912; they had four daughters, Ethel, Jean, Lorna, and Olive.

== Education ==
He attended Scotch College, Melbourne. He graduated Bachelor of Arts (B.A.) from the University of Melbourne on 11 May 1901.

== Death ==
He died in Melbourne on 27 December 1959.
