= Ian Upjohn =

- Born: Melbourne, Victoria
- Relatives: Sir William Upjohn (grandfather)
- Military career
- Allegiance: Australia
- Branch: Australian Army Reserve
- Rank: Lieutenant Colonel
- Commands: 4th/19th Prince of Wales's Light Horse
- Conflicts: Operation Anode
- Awards: Conspicuous Service Cross

Ian William Upjohn, CSC, QC is an Australian barrister and Army Reserve officer, and recipient of the Conspicuous Service Cross.

== Biography ==
Born in Melbourne, Victoria, Upjohn is the son of a Melbourne surgeon and grandson of Sir William Upjohn, surgeon and Chancellor of the University of Melbourne. After completing his schooling at Scotch College, Upjohn studied at the University of Melbourne, graduating with Honours degrees in Law and Arts. As a university student Upjohn joined the Melbourne University Regiment, achieving the rank of lance corporal before undertaking the Herring Course for first appointment as a commissioned officer. He graduated as a second lieutenant into the Australian Army Reserve in March 1989 and was posted to the 4th/19th Prince of Wales's Light Horse.

After being articled at the firm Blake Dawson Waldron in Melbourne, he was called to the Victorian Bar in 1993. He subsequently studied in London and was awarded a Master of Laws from the University of London.

On 11 June 2007, as part of the 2007 Queen's Birthday Honours List, Upjohn was awarded the Conspicuous Service Cross "[f]or outstanding achievement as Commanding Officer of 4th/19th Prince of Wales's Light Horse within the 4th Brigade." He was subsequently appointed to command Australian soldiers in the Solomon Islands. In mid-2011 Upjohn was appointed as an Honorary Aide-de-Camp to His Excellency Alex Chernov, the Governor of Victoria.

On 26 November 2014, Upjohn was appointed as a Senior Counsel.
