= Eddie Toms =

Australian rules footballer (1872–1953)

Personal information
- Full name: Edward Vincent Toms
- Born: 28 July 1872; Richmond, Victoria
- Died: 10 August 1953 (aged 81); Albert Park, Victoria

Playing career^{1}
Years	Club	Games (Goals)
1897	South Melbourne	7 (0)
- ^{1} Playing statistics correct to the end of 1897.

Edward Vincent Toms (28 July 1872 – 10 August 1953) was an Australian rules footballer who played with both Melbourne and South Melbourne in the Victorian Football Association (VFA) and with South Melbourne in the Victorian Football League (VFL).

== Family ==
The son of William John Toms (1837-1913), and Bridget Catherine Toms (1836-1917), née McGrath, Edward Vincent Toms was born at Richmond, Victoria on 28 July 1872.

He married Beatrice Mabel Kelly (1872-1958), at Richmond, Victoria on 29 April 1907. They had four children: Eileen (B.1908), Kevin (b.1910), Beatrice (b.1913), and Sheila (b.1916).

== Education ==
Educated at the Yarra Park State School, he went (on a scholarship) to Scotch College, Melbourne for four years (1887 to 1890). He played for the College's First XVIII in 1889 and 1890, and was dux of the College in 1890.

== Football ==
=== Melbourne (VFA) ===
He played for Melbourne in the VFA in 1890, 1891, 1892, 1893, and 1895; he was unable to play in 1894, due to an injury.

=== South Melbourne (VFA) ===
He was cleared from Melbourne to South Melbourne on 29 April 1896. He played on the half-back flank in South Melbourne's 1896 premiership match loss to Collingwood.

=== South Melbourne (VFL) ===
He played in seven matches for South Melbourne in the club's first-ever VFL season (1897), with his last game against Melbourne, at the MCG, on 26 June 1897.

== Educator ==
He was the Principal of the Albert Park Grammar School and of Toms' Business College, both of which he conducted for half a century, having taken over the operation of the Grammar School from Samuel Newbury, its previous owner, in 1896.

== Death ==
He died at Albert Park, Victoria on 10 August 1953.
