= Those Usual Suspects =

Australian musical group

- Origin: Melbourne, Australia
- Genres: House, tribal house, African
- Years active: 2004 - present
- Labels: Phazing; Ministry of Sound; Defected; Yellow Productions; Asterix Music
- Formerly of: Africanism All Stars
- Members: Atridge D'Costa; Wei-Shen Mak
- Past members: Maarcos
- Website: thoseusualsuspects.com

Those Usual Suspects are an Australian electronic dance music band. The group is a duo (formerly trio with Maarcos) - composed of Atridge (Atridge D'Costa) and Wei-Shen (Wei-Shen Mak).

The group were the first Australian artists to be signed on as one of Bob Sinclar's Africanism All Stars in 2007 and have releases several singles since then - most notably their collaboration with Dirty South called "Walking Alone".

== Discography ==
=== Original ===
as Those Usual Suspects
Title	Featuring	Year	Label
Greece 2000			Ministry of Sound
Shadows	Abigail Bailey		Ministry of Sound
Dakka			Ministry of Sound
Palazzo			Ministry of Sound
Animalia			Ministry of Sound
In This Life	Chappell		Ministry of Sound
Feel The Need			Ministry of Sound
Together			Ministry of Sound
with Africanism
Title	Featuring	Year	Label
Dakka			Yellow Productions
Walking Alone	Erik Hecht [with Dirty South]		Phazing
Give It To Me	Jerome Sebag		Onelove Records
My Star	Yota		Computer Science
My Heart	Mutu		Onelove Records
Can't Hold On	Erik Hecht		Onelove Records
Burn Forever	Erik Hecht [with Nordean]		Phazing

=== Remixes ===
as Those Usual Suspects
Original Artist	Title	Year	Label
Bob Sinclar ft. Steve Edwards	Together		Defected
Kings of Tomorrow feat. Julie McKnight	Finally		Defected
Sgt Slick	Sax Addict		Vicious Vinyl
Mark James feat. Hamish	Come With Me		Ministry of Sound
The Similou	All This Love		Ministry of Sound
Ou Est Le Swimming Pool	Jackson's Last Stand		Ministry of Sound
as Maarcos & Wei-Shen
Inaya Day	Nasty Girl (Wei-Shen and Maarcos Remix)		Vinyl Pusher
