= Andrew Erickson =

American biathlete (born 1976)

Personal information
- Born: May 5, 1976 (age 50) Minnetonka, Minnesota, United States

Sport
- Sport: Biathlon

Andrew Erickson (born May 5, 1976) is an American biathlete. He competed in the men's relay event at the 1998 Winter Olympics.
