= James Balderstone =

Australian businessman (1921–2014)

Sir James Schofield Balderstone AC (2 May 1921 – 15 October 2014) was a prominent Australian director of public companies.

Balderstone attended Scotch College, Melbourne. After leaving school he served in the Royal Australian Navy during World War II from 1940 to 1945. He was serving on HMAS Kanimbla in Sydney Harbour on the night that Japanese midget submarines attacked. After the war he embarked on a career in the rural sector and business.

His directorships and roles included:

- Chairman of BHP 1984–89, which included fending off a takeover by Robert Holmes à Court
- Chairman of AMP
- Chairman of Stanbroke Pastoral Company
- Chairman of Chase AMP Bank
- Chairman of the Council of Scotch College, Melbourne
- Deputy Chairman of Westpac
- Director of ICI Australia
- Director of Woodside Petroleum

He was knighted in 1983 for services to primary industry and commerce, and was made a Companion of the Order of Australia (AC) in 1992.

He had an identical twin brother, Robert Balderstone CMG MC (1921-2012), a councillor of the Royal Agricultural Society of Victoria for 41 years and president for six, from 1976.

Sir James Balderstone died on 15 October 2014, aged 93. His final 13 years were marred by the effects of a stroke which hampered his speech.
