= Africanism All Stars =

France-based music project

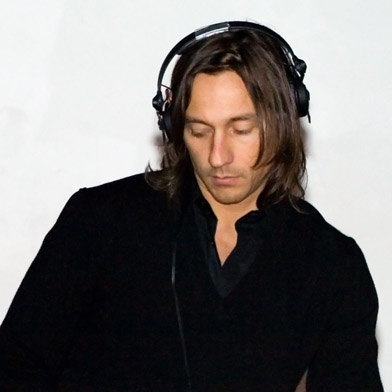
- Photo of Bob Sinclair spinning

Background information
- Origin: Paris, France
- Genres: House, EDM
- Years active: 2001–present
- Labels: Tommy Boy (U.S. only); Yellow Productions; East West France; Waerloga
- Members: David Guetta; Bob Sinclar; Martin Solveig; Tony Allen; Lekan Babalola; Joachim Garraud; Yves Larock; Those Usual Suspects; Eddie Amador; Osibisa

Africanism All Stars is a France-based project that was launched in 2001, consisting of DJs and mixers in France who collaborate with African-based artists and acts.

Among the artists involved include Bob Sinclar, Martin Solveig, David Guetta, Yves Larock, DJ Gregory (Grégory Darsa), Malinga Five, Joachim Garraud, Tim Deluxe, KC Flightt, Björn Lundt, Yvan Voice, Osibisa, Tom & Joyce, Tony Allen, NaSSau, Lekan Babalola, Jacob Desvarieux/Kassav, Shinichi Osawa, Salomé de Bahia, Liquid People, Eddie Amador, House Rules, Jeff Kellner, Légo and Those Usual Suspects.

In 2005, Tommy Boy Records bought the project to its label in the United States and released its first single from Africanism III set, "Summer Moon". This lead-off track went to number one on the Billboard Hot Dance Club Play chart the week of 23 July 2005. "Hard" became the act's second U.S. dance chart-topper in November 2006.

== Discography ==
=== Africanism Vol. 1 (2001) ===
1. "Intro"
2. "Bisou Sucré"
3. "Tourment D'amour" (album Mix)
4. "Block Party" (album Mix)
5. "The Dragon"
6. "Love Is the Answer"
7. "Do It"
8. "Kazet"
9. "My Dub"
10. "My Beat"
11. "Call It Jungle Jazz"
12. "Les Enfants Du Bled"
13. "Peplum Africa"
14. "Edony (Clap Your Hands)"
15. "Trompeta Alegre"
16. "Zulu's"
17. "Donny" Phase 2(The reign)

=== Africanism All Stars Mixed By DJ Gregory & Bob Sinclar (2002) ===
CD 1

1. Bob Sinclar – "On the Drum"
2. DJ Gregory – "Damelo"
3. John Ciafone – "Mojito"
4. DJ Pippi Pres. Pasion Flamenca – "Fatal Fatal" (Rawtal Mix)
5. Mochico – "Mochico 3"
6. Mafikizolo – "Loot"
7. Amy Helm – "Own Way Home"
8. K-Dope Pres. Strictly Rhythms Vol. v1 – "Watch This"
9. Maw feat. Wunmi – "The Time Is Now"
10. Soha – "Izabelle"
11. DJ Gregory – "Tropical Soundclash"
12. Los Amigos Invisibles – "Bruja"
13. Next Evidence – "Morning Breeze"
14. Julien Jabre – "Deliverance"
15. Trackheadz – "Our Music"
16. Julie Mcknight – "Home" (Knee Deep Club Mix)

CD 2

1. "Intro"
2. Bob Sinclar – "Bisou Sucré"
3. DJ Gregory – "Tourment D'amour"
4. DJ Gregory – "Block Party"
5. Liquide People – "The Dragon"
6. Liquide People – "Love Is the Answer"
7. Eddie Amador vs Bob Sinclar – "Do It"
8. Bob Sinclar – "Kazet"
9. Bob Sinclar – "My Dub"
10. Bob Sinclar – "My Beat"
11. Matt Samo – "Call It Jungle Jazz"
12. Soha – "Les Enfants Du Bled"
13. Matt Samo – "Peplum Africa"
14. Martin Solveig feat. Hossam Ramzy – "Edony (Clap Your Hands)"
15. Lego – "Trompeta Alegre"
16. Brandy Volant – "Zulu's"

=== Africanism Vol. 2 (2003) ===
CD 1

1. Mixed By Bob Sinclar – "Intro"
2. Bob Sinclar – "On the Drum"
3. Bob Sinclar ft. Exille One – "Viel Ou La"
4. DJ Gregory – "Soldiers"
5. Sumo – "Wintersong"
6. Gwen – "Soul Conga"
7. Liquid People ft. Heidi Vogel – "Don't You Go Away"
8. Bibi – "Macumba Walélé"
9. Press Purah ft. L Davis – "Maini Owaana"
10. Martin Solveig – "Heartbeat"
11. Bob Sinclar – "Slave Nation"
12. Soha – "Takemussa"
13. Diva – "Balearic"
14. Q Tee Fingers – "I'm Ready"
15. Diva – "Primavera"

CD 2

1. "Intro"
2. Tony Allen – "Afro Disco Beat"
3. Denis Ferrer – "Dem People Go"
4. Martin Solveig vs Salif Keita – "Madan"
5. Claude Monnet Pres. Monica Nogueira – "Infencia Magica"
6. Mr Hermano – "Vasco Da Gama"
7. Kalawang – "Jingo"
8. Masters at Work – "Ekabo"
9. Kongas – "Anikina O"
10. Chocolatine – "Emma"
11. DJ Gregory – "Tropical Soundclash" (K-Dope Remix)
12. Martin Solveig – "Edony" (unreleased Crowdy Short Edit)
13. Despina Vandy – "Gia" (DJ Gregory Remix)
14. DJ Gregory – "Elle"
15. Silent Poet – "Save the Day" (Phil Asher Remix)

=== Africanism Vol. 3 (2005) ===
1. "Intro"
2. Zookey – "Lift Your Leg Up" (Bob Sinclar Remix)
3. "Kalimbo"
4. "Amour Kéfé"
5. "Summer Moon"
6. "Imbalaye"
7. "Antigua" (Bob Sinclar)
8. "Talibé"
9. "Elegba"
10. "Viet Dao"
11. "Sye Bwa"
12. "Samouraï Theme"
13. "Steel Storm"
14. "Juju Beat"

== See also ==
- List of Number 1 Dance Hits (United States)
- List of artists who reached number one on the US Dance chart
- Africanisms
