= Johnny Hay =

Australian rules footballer (1886–1958)

Personal information
- Full name: John McKenzie Hay
- Born: 21 April 1886; Rokewood, Victoria
- Died: 21 September 1958 (aged 72); Paddington, New South Wales
- Original team: Scotch College
- Height: 179 cm (5 ft 10 in)
- Weight: 81 kg (179 lb)

Playing career^{1}
Years	Club	Games (Goals)
1906–07	Collingwood	19 (2)
- ^{1} Playing statistics correct to the end of 1907.

John McKenzie Hay (21 April 1886 – 21 September 1958) was an Australian rules footballer who played with Collingwood in the Victorian Football League (VFL).

== Family ==
The son of Presbyterian cleric George Hay (1843-1928), and Elizabeth McKelvie Hay (1847-1926), née McKenzie, John McKenzie Hay was born in Rokewood, Victoria on 21 April 1886.

His older brother, Robert Hay (1880–1959), played with Fitzroy in the VFL.

He married Daisy Wiliams in 1908.

== Football ==
He was cleared from the Ballarat Football Club to play with Collingwood in 1906.
