= Scotch College, Melbourne =

Scotch College

Location
- 1 Morrison Street; Hawthorn, Victoria, 3122; Australia; 37°50′3″S 145°1′46″E

Information
- Type: private school, single sex, Christian day and boarding school
- Motto: Latin: Deo Patriae Litteris (For God, for Country, and for Learning)
- Denomination: Presbyterian
- Established: 1851; 175 years ago
- Founder: Rev. James Forbes
- Chairman: Hamish Tadgell
- Principal: Dr. Scott H. Marsh
- Chaplain: Rev. Dr. Douglas Campbell & Rev. David Assender
- Staff: ~350
- Gender: Boys
- Enrolment: ~1,957 (P–12)
- Houses: Bond, Davidson, Eggleston, Field, Fleming, Forbes, Gilray, Lawson, Littlejohn, Monash, Morrison, Selby-Smith
- Colours: Cardinal, gold and blue
- Affiliation: Associated Public Schools of Victoria
- Alumni: Old Scotch Collegians
- Website: www.scotch.vic.edu.au

Scotch College is a private, Presbyterian day and boarding school for boys, located in Hawthorn, an inner-eastern suburb of Melbourne, Victoria, Australia.

The college was established in 1851 as The Melbourne Academy in a house in Spring Street, Melbourne, by the Free Presbyterian Church of Victoria at the urging of James Forbes. It is the oldest extant secondary school in Victoria and is celebrating its 175th birthday in 2026.

Scotch is a founding member of the Associated Public Schools of Victoria (APS), and is affiliated with the International Boys' Schools Coalition (IBSC), the Junior School Heads Association of Australia (JSHAA), the Australian Boarding Schools' Association (ABSA), the Association of Independent Schools of Victoria (AISV), and the Headmasters' and Headmistresses' Conference. The School is a member of the Global Alliance of Leading-Edge Schools.

An investigation by The Age and The Sydney Morning Herald in 2021 found that Scotch is one of Australia's richest schools, and had the largest financial investment portfolio of any Australian school (valued at the time at more than $144 million).

== History ==
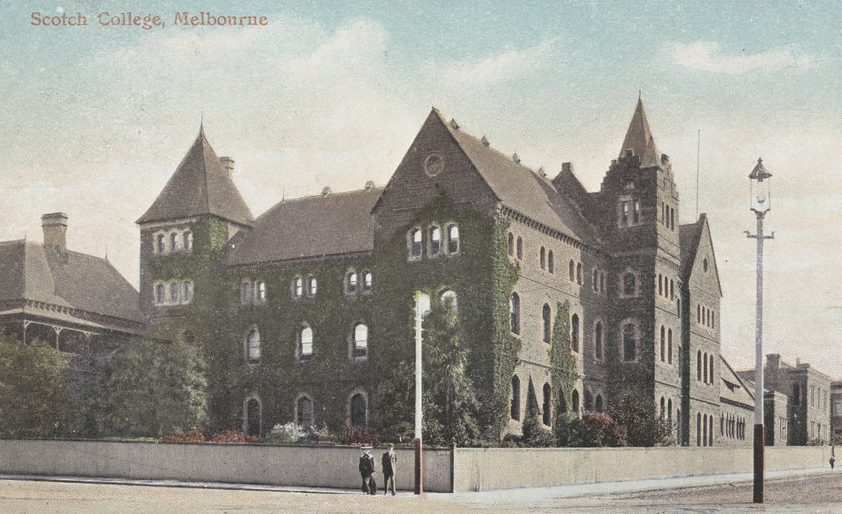
The School at its former East Melbourne site (circa 1906) prior to moving to the current site at Hawthorn

Scotch College is the oldest surviving secondary school in Victoria. Its foundation was due to the initiative of James Forbes, of the Free Presbyterian Church, who had arrived in 1838 as the first settled Christian minister in what became the colony of Victoria in 1851. It is "the outcome of the old Scottish ideal of education", in which church and school were inextricably connected.

The school opened on 6 October 1851, mere weeks after the passing of James Forbes under the name of the Melbourne Academy in a small house in Spring Street, with Robert Lawson, a Scot from Edinburgh University, as the first principal. The house was soon outgrown, as was a larger one on the northwest corner of Spring and Little Collins Streets (later the Ulster Family Hotel) and the Church applied to the government for a grant of land. Two acres were reserved for the school on Eastern Hill and substantial new buildings were erected there in 1853. The cost was met partly by a government grant and partly from funds raised by the friends of the school.

Lawson resigned in 1856. Under his successor, Alexander Morrison, the school grew; it came under the oversight of the newly formed Presbyterian Church of Victoria in 1859. Morrison had been Rector of St John's Grammar School, Hamilton, Lanarkshire and remained at Scotch for 46 years, during almost all of which time his brother Robert was a master of the college. William Still Littlejohn, who took over the school in 1904, served for 29 years, and his successor, Colin Gilray, for 19.

Gilray was succeeded in 1953 by R. Selby Smith. Smith resigned in 1964 to become the Foundation Dean of Education at Monash University.

C. O. Healey, who had been Headmaster of Sydney Grammar School since 1951, succeeded Smith. Healey retired in January 1975.

In May 1975 P. A. V. Roff, formerly Headmaster of Scotch College, Adelaide, was installed as the seventh principal of the college. Roff's tenure, though a brief seven years, was characterised by an expanding voice for staff in the day-to-day management of the school, the establishment of a Foundation Office at the School and the widening of the house system. His last few years saw the school in dispute over ownership of the school which, for the principal and the school community, was a time of stress. In 1980 the decision was made to incorporate the school and a new council was appointed, with representatives from the Presbyterian Church of Victoria, the Old Scotch Collegians' Association and the community.

F. G. Donaldson, a vice principal from Wallace High School (Northern Ireland), with a PhD in atomic physics from Queen's University Belfast, succeeded Roff in 1983. Under his principalship there was a building program, the development of ICT for administrative and educational purposes, and enhanced pastoral care of students.

I. Tom Batty was appointed as the ninth principal of Scotch and installed into office on 14 July 2008.

It was reported in 2015 that the school had acknowledged claims of historical abuse, offering compensation and apologising to former students.

An announcement of Matthew Leeds as the tenth principal was made in November 2021 but he was terminated in January 2022 before starting in the role, following a complaint alleging misconduct in 2017.

S. H. Marsh was appointed as the tenth principal of Scotch, commencing his term in January 2023, and is the current principal of Scotch.

== Name ==
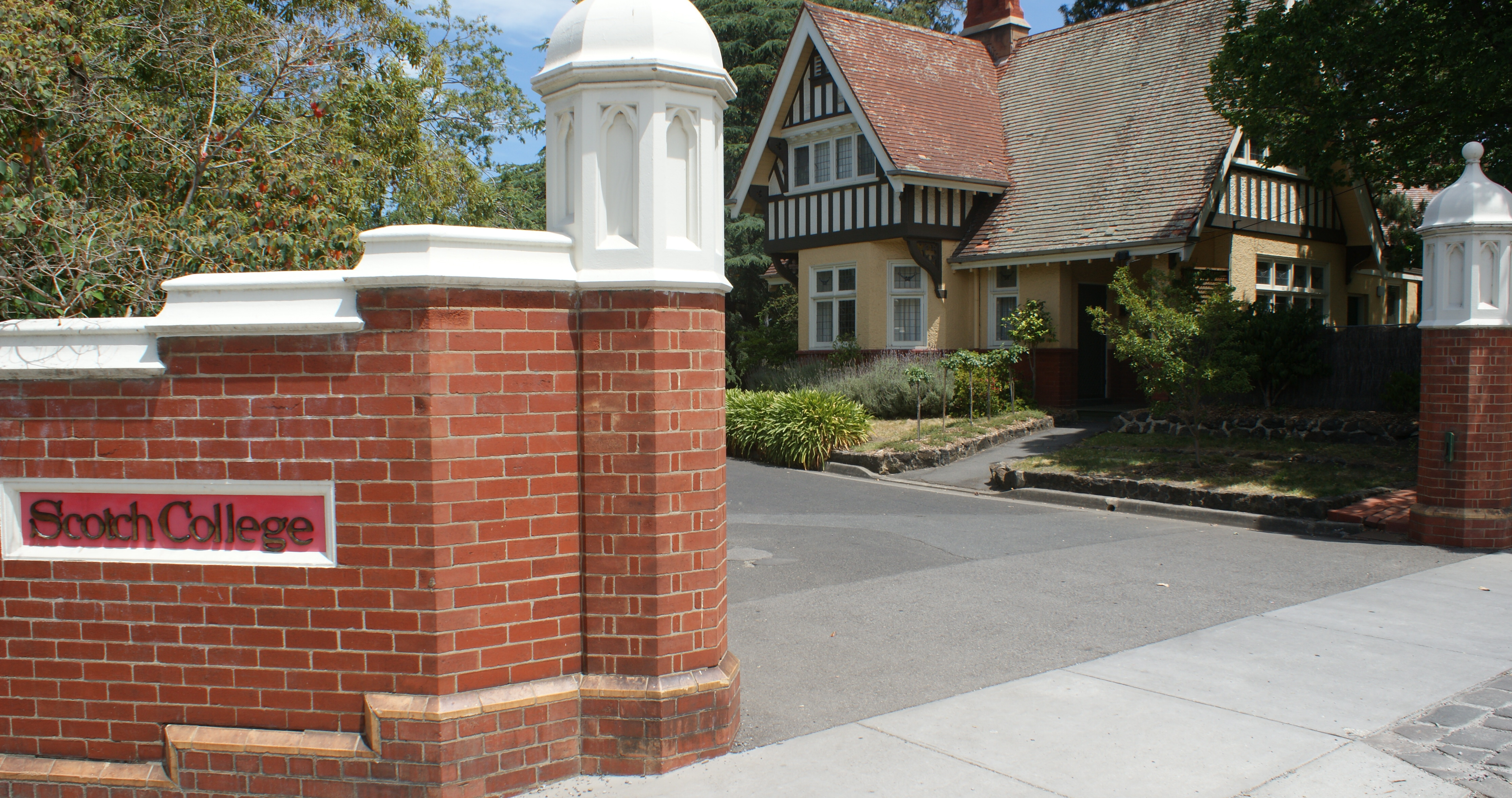
The name "Scotch College" appears at the entrance to the boarding precinct (2009)

The School was originally called "The Melbourne Academy", after its location, when it opened in 1851. In its early years it was also known as

- Mr Lawson's Academy – named after the first principal, Robert Lawson
- The Grammar School
- The Scots' College – the college of the Scots
- The Scotch College – the college that is Scottish

For a while all of these names were used concurrently until in the 1860s the usage settled on "The Scotch College", which was later shortened to be simply "Scotch College".

== Buildings ==
Scotch College contains more than 30 named buildings and facilities, including Memorial Hall, James Forbes Center, Lithgow Center and the Randall Building. The earliest building on Scotch College was part of the original campus when the school moved there in 1916. The Memorial Hall was one of the earliest major buildings, with its foundation stone laid by Sir John Monash in 1920. During World War II in 1942, the Glen House, an 1875 castle-style mansion in Scotch College was intentionally demolished as authorities believed that the distinctive three-storey tower and high flagpole would make it a visual landmark and target for Japanese bombers.

== Coat-of-arms and motto ==
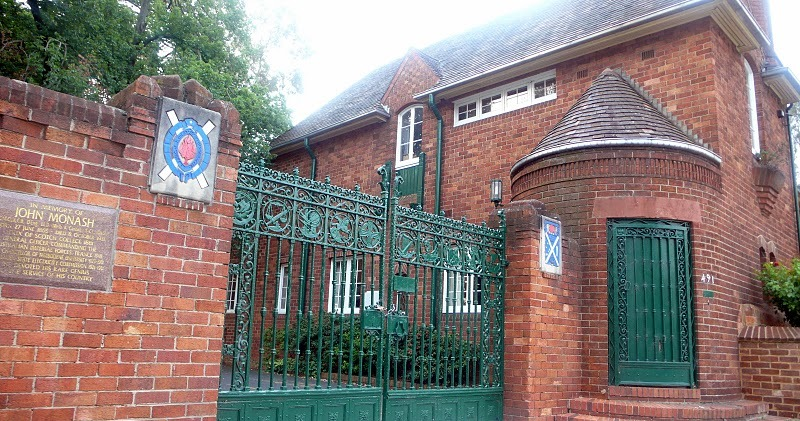
The Monash Gates feature the school's coat of arms (right side) and the symbol of the Presbyterian Church (left side)

The School's coat-of-arms (shown above, right) features the following elements:

- The Burning Bush – the Burning Bush, from the Book of Exodus, is a common symbol used by the Presbyterian Church, representing Christian faith.
- A white saltire on a blue background – the flag of Scotland (St Andrew's Cross) representing the School's Scottish heritage.
- The Southern Cross – the Southern Cross constellation is a common symbol for Australia, representing the School's location and home.
- A crown – representing loyalty to the sovereign and legitimate government.
- A lymphad or birlin – a Scottish heraldic ship with oars in use, thus rowing into the wind, and representing enterprise and perseverance.
- A torch – representing the torch of knowledge and learning.

The motto of the School, shown in Scottish heraldic style in a scroll above the coat-of-arms, is Latin: "Deo Patriae Litteris". Its meaning in English is "For God, For Country, For Learning".

== Principals ==
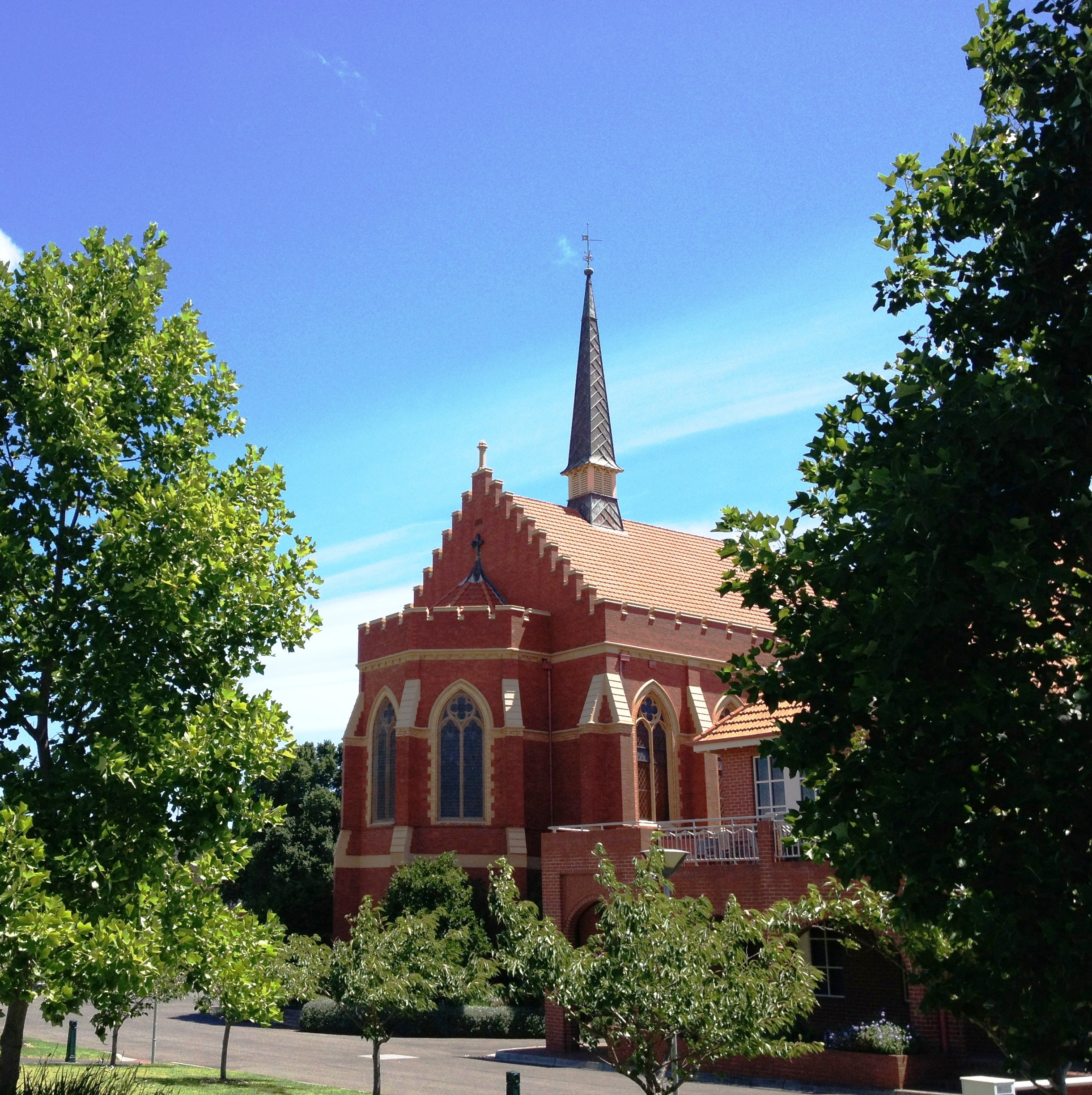
The Memorial Hall

Years served	Name
1851–1856	Robert Lawson
1857–1903	Alexander Morrison
1904–1933	William Still Littlejohn
1934–1953	Colin Macdonald Gilray OBE MC
1953–1964	Richard Selby Smith OBE
1965–1974	Colin Oswald Healey OBE TD
1975–1981	Philip Anthony Vere Roff
1983–2007	Francis Gordon Donaldson AM
2008–2022	Ian Thomas Batty
2023–present	Scott Hugh Marsh

== Governance and denominational affiliation ==
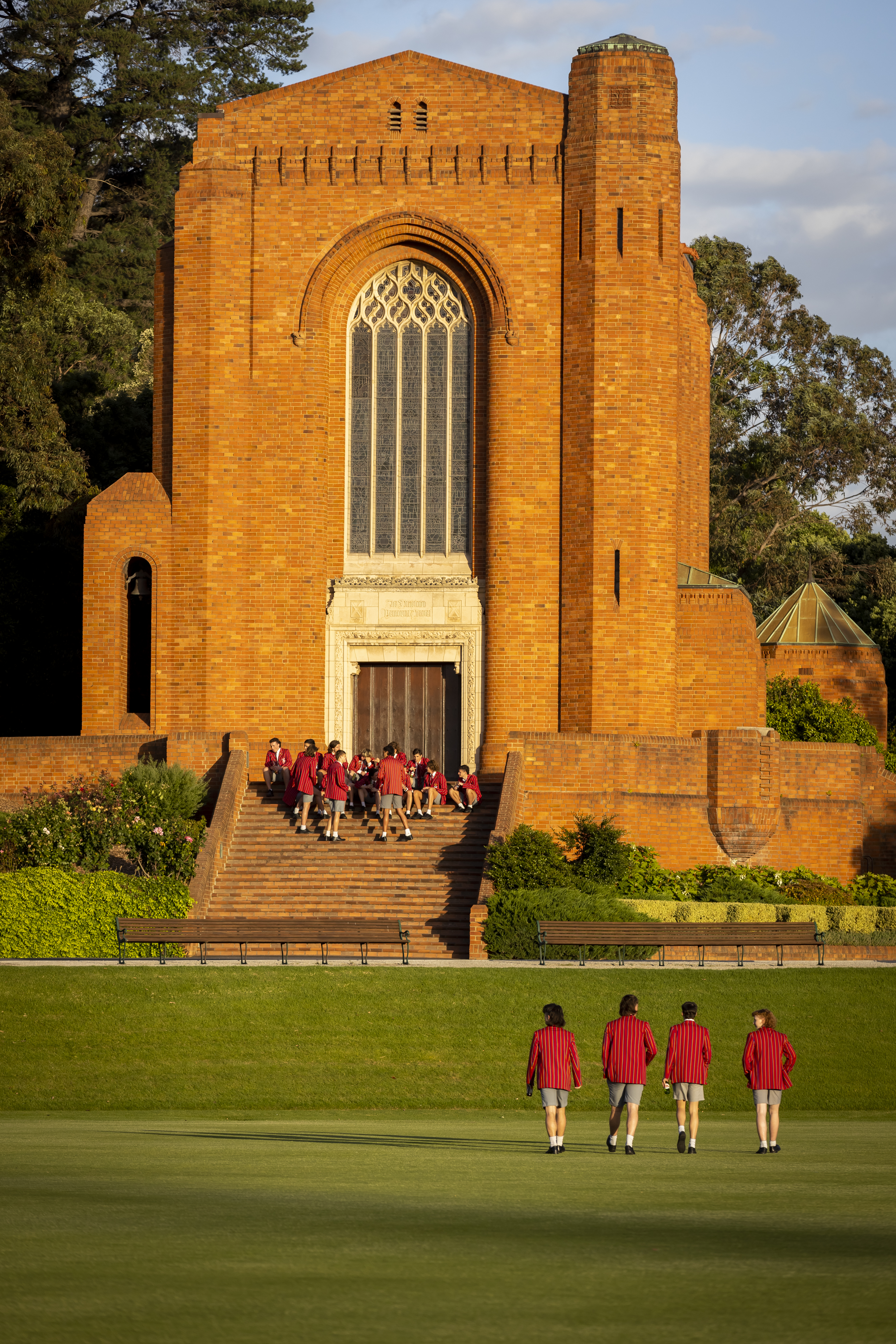
Littlejohn Memorial Chapel

Scotch is an incorporated body governed by a Council of seventeen members – who are directors – made up of three groups; five Presbyterian Church of Victoria nominees (Group A), five persons (usually Old Boys) nominated by the Old Scotch Collegians' Association (Group B), and seven persons nominated by the council from the community at large (Group C), usually with some connection with the School and the Christian church. All appointments are made annually by the Presbyterian Church from the first of November every year.

Chairmen of the Council have included Sir Arthur Robinson, Sir Archibald Glenn, Sir James Balderstone, Michael Robinson AO, David Crawford AO and David A. Kemp AC.

In 1977, most congregations of the Australian Presbyterian Church left the church and joined with the Methodist and Congregationalist churches in Australia to form the Uniting Church in Australia. The Presbyterian Church of Australia continued with the remaining congregations. In the split, Scotch College, Melbourne was allocated to the Presbyterian Church of Australia by the Handley Commission which was appointed to distribute the assets of the churches, which included an even number of representatives from the Uniting Church and the continuing Presbyterian Church as well as independent commissioners. At the time the Scotch Council unsuccessfully appealed this decision.

== Campuses ==
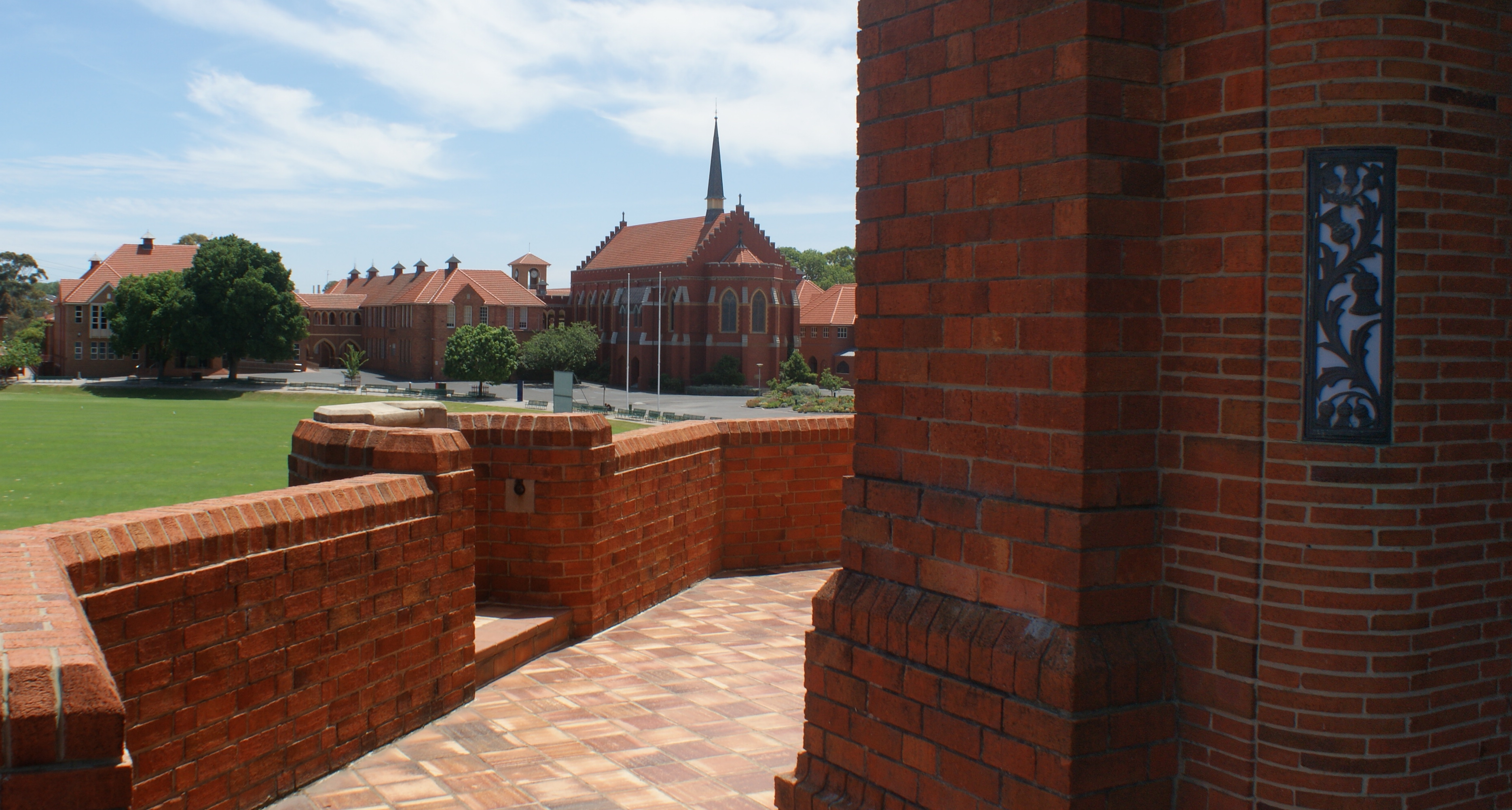
The Senior School, as seen from the forecourt of the Littlejohn Memorial Chapel, with the open-air pulpit in the foreground (2009)

- Hawthorn: The school has a single boarding, sporting and academic campus of 27 hectares (67 acres) in suburban Hawthorn. Sporting facilities include ovals and soccer/rugby fields, two synthetic grass hockey/soccer fields, tennis courts, an indoor swimming pool, an indoor diving pool, three gymnasiums, two weights rooms and three squash courts. The school is situated on the banks of the Yarra River and has rowing and boating facilities located within its grounds.
- Healesville: The school has 80 hectares (198 acres) of forest with a lodge in the hills at Healesville east of Melbourne, used for Class Retreats, as well as Scout and Cadet camps.
- Phillip Island: The school has an absolute-beach-front residential seaside property at Cowes on Phillip Island, which is the site of a one-week orientation camp for Year 7 students and other camps.

== Boarding ==
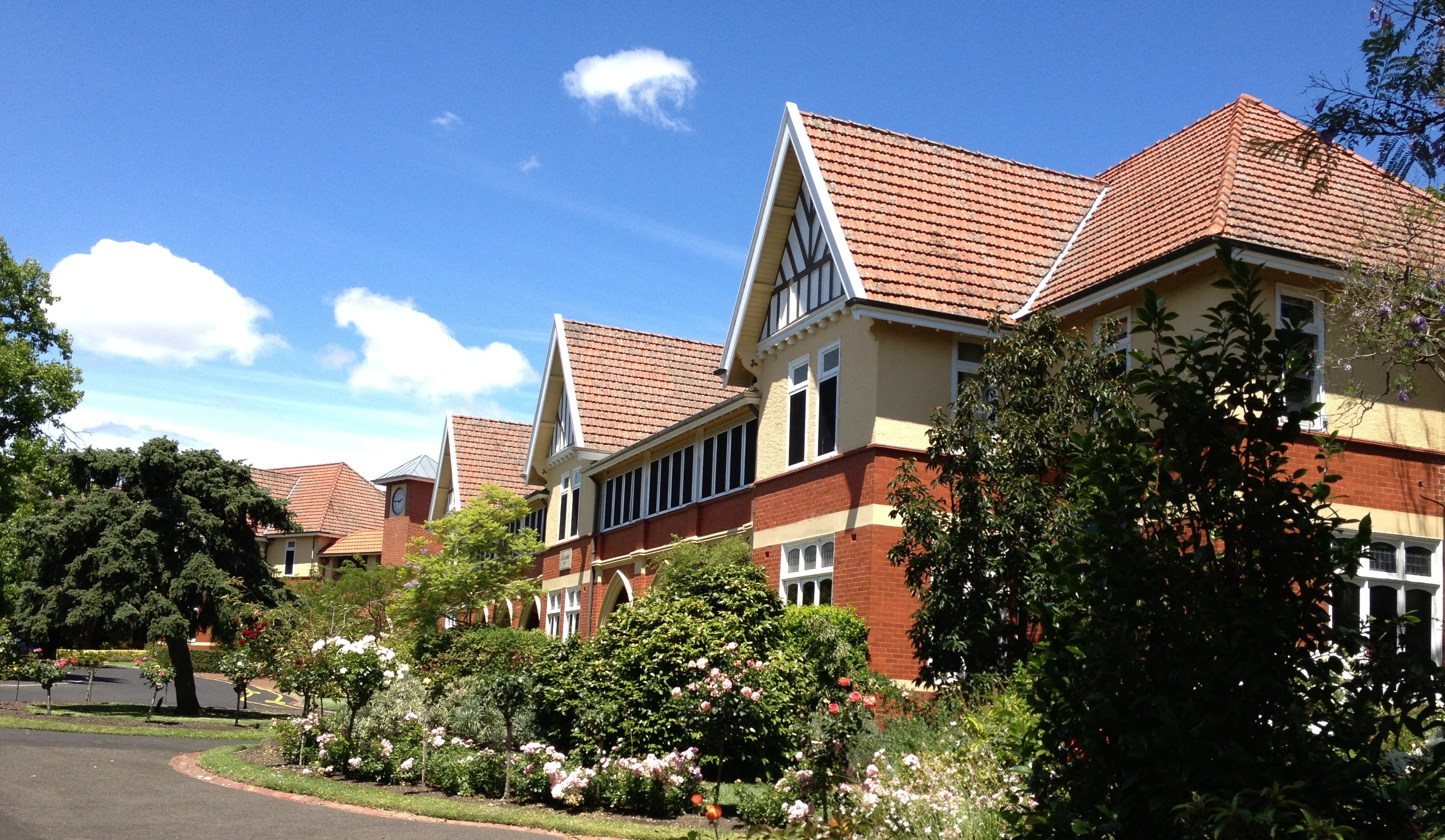
One of the three boarding houses - School House (2012)

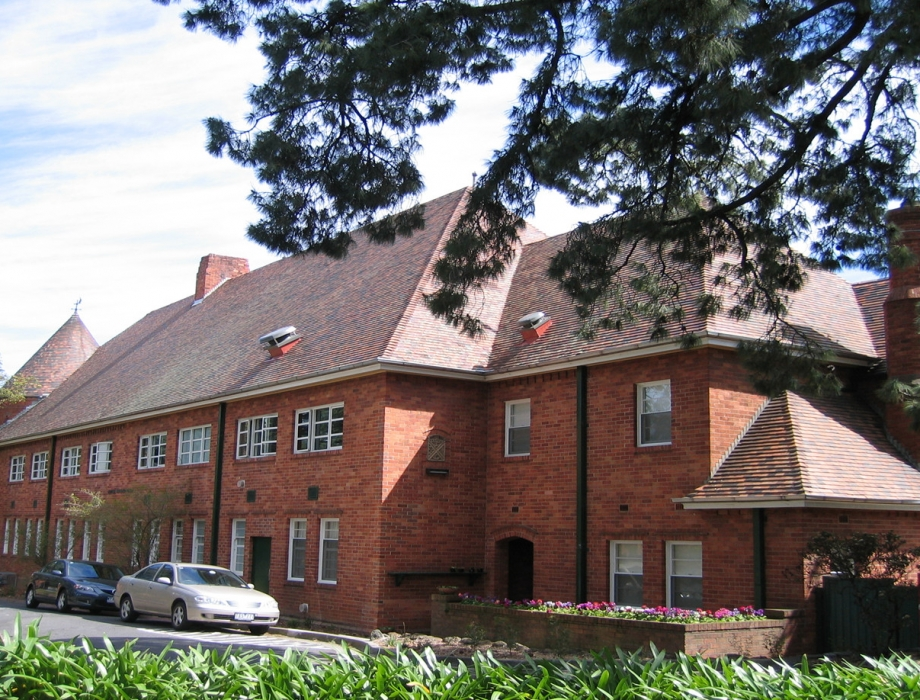
One of the three boarding houses - Arthur Robinson House (2014)

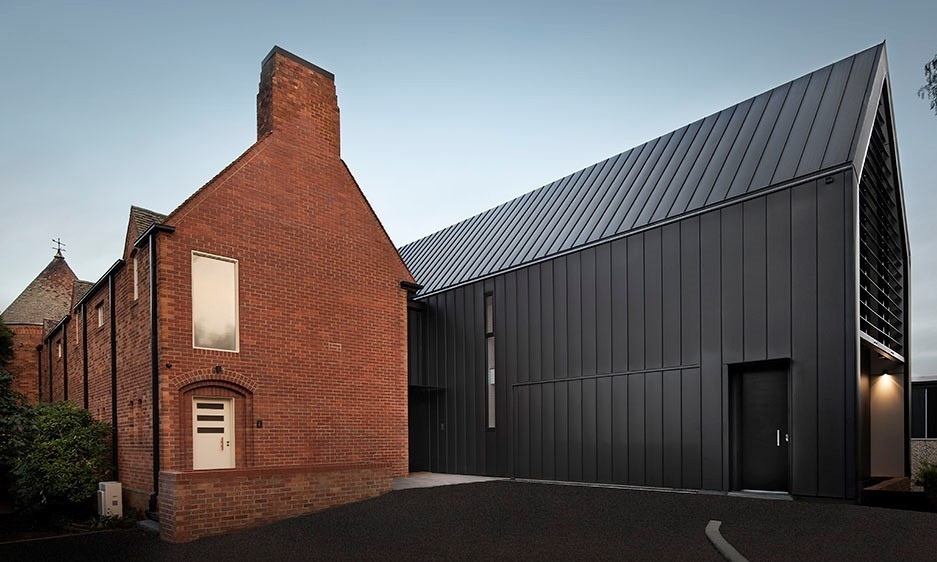
Isabella Lawson Lodge, home of the Dean of Boarding

Scotch has been a boarding school since its foundation. Today the School caters for 165 boarders of whom around 70% are drawn from around Australia and 30% are from overseas. The boarding precinct is on "The Hill" which overlooks the Senior School at the main Hawthorn campus. There are three boarding houses: School House, McMeckan House and Arthur Robinson House. Both School House and McMeckan House were built as the gift of Anthony Mackie, and his brother and sisters, in memory of their uncle Captain James McMeckan. Arthur Robinson House is named after a Chairman of the School Council, Sir Arthur Robinson.

== Curriculum ==
Scotch students study towards the Victorian Certificate of Education (VCE), which is the main secondary student assessment program in Victoria which ranks students with an Australian Tertiary Admission Rank (ATAR) for university entrance purposes.

In 2024, Scotch College produced 10 duces who received a perfect ATAR of 99.95.

Scotch College VCE results 2012-2025
Year	Rank	Median study score	Scores of 40+ (%)	Cohort size
2012	23	36	26.9	440
2013	22	36	27.0	459
2014	14	36	26.6	451
2015	32	35	22.3	443
2016	28	35	23.9	453
2017	16	36	26.8	439
2018	31	35	21.6	450
2019	24	35	27.2	427
2020	26	35	23.4	432
2021	32	34	20.9	459
2022	25	35	23.2	439
2023	41	34	18.4	440
2024	34	34	22.6	437
2025	46	34	19.0	450

== Extra-curricular activities ==
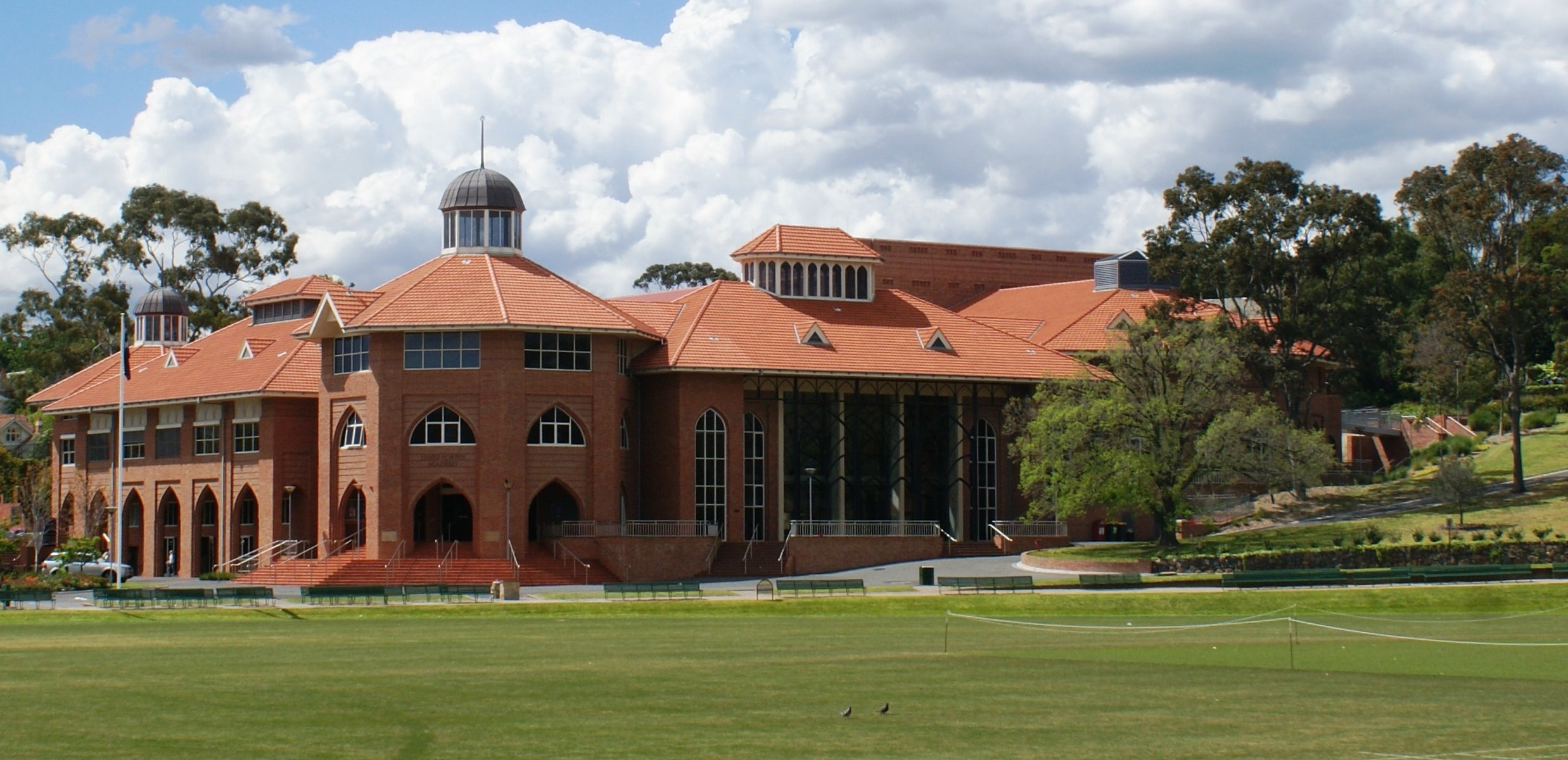
The music and drama school - named the James Forbes Academy after the School's founder James Forbes (2009)

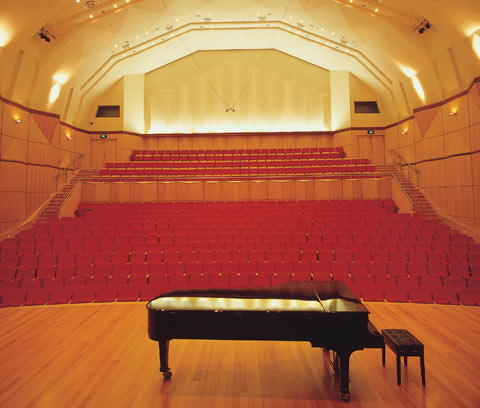
Ian Roach Concert Hall - in the James Forbes Academy

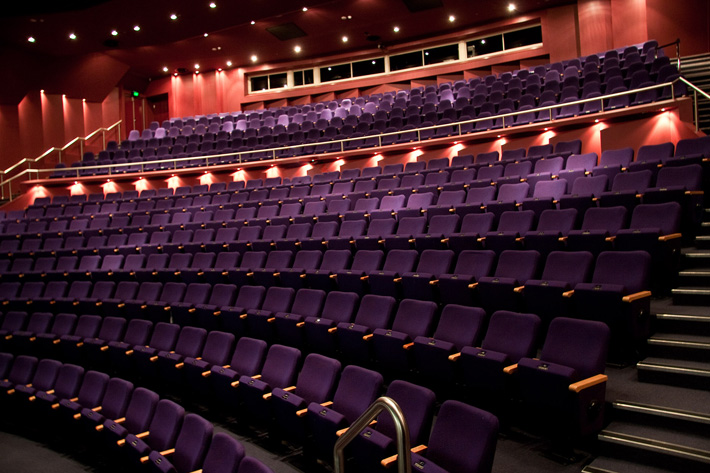
Geoffrey McComas Theatre - in the James Forbes Academy

Some extra-curricular groups and activities at Scotch are:

- Army Cadet Corps: The Scotch College Cadet Corps was established in 1884, and holds an annual Tattoo. Cadets have weekly activities at the school and participate in camps and bivouacs.
- Pipe Band: The Scotch College Pipes and Drums Band was established in 1946 and is one of the oldest school pipe bands in Australia. It wears the Scotch College tartan, and competes at national and international competitions and highland festivals. They yearly preform at the World Pipe Band Championships, recently placing 4th overall in the world. It performs at school and public events including in the annual ANZAC Day March to the Shrine of Remembrance, and the annual school cadet march. It is the current national champion in the Juvenile grade. The pipe band performed on stage with Sir Paul McCartney on 5 and 6 December 2017, during his One on One tour. Sir Paul famously autographed the vellum of the bass drum on stage.
- Military Band: The Military Band performs at school, and in public including in the annual ANZAC Day March to the Shrine of Remembrance and on overseas tours. All members of the band are also members of the Australian Army Cadet Corps.
- 1st Hawthorn (Scotch College) Scout Group: Scotch has its own Scout Group, established in 1926 by the school chaplain, Alexander Rowan Macneil. The Scout Group meets regularly each Thursday at the school and participate in off-campus activities such as camps. The Scout Group is affiliated with Scouts Victoria
- Sports First Aid: A Wednesday afternoon service that boys can choose to undertake to gain advanced training in first aid. Members of the service learn valuable skills such as CPR and soft and hard tissue injury management. Members help the Scotch College community by regularly attending Saturday mornings to treat any injuries suffered during sport matches. An annual camp is held at Cowes where boys practice the skills they have learned.
- Debating: Scotch regularly participates in debating, competing in the Debaters Association of Victoria Schools Competition. Each season, the school hosts the Hawthorn region of the Schools Competition. The earliest DAV success occurred in 1985, with Scotch winning the A Grade competition. In 2008 the First Debating Team were the State A Grade runners-up, while the school was also runner up in the State British Parliamentary Debating Competition. Scotch debaters have recently toured the United Kingdom participating in inter-school debating tournaments. In 2009, Scotch won the inaugural Monash Viewpoint Economics Debate. In 2010, Scotch made Victorian debating history when it won the A Grade (Year 12), B Grade (Year 11) and C Grade (Year 10) State Grand Finals in the DAV (Debaters Association of Victoria) Debating Competition. Scotch again won the State Grand Finals in 2012 for A Grade, in 2014 for D Grade, in 2015 for C Grade, in 2017 for A Grade, in 2019 for B Grade, and in 2022 for B Grade. The school also made grand finals appearances in 2012 for B Grade, in 2016 for B Grade, and in 2019 for C Grade. More recently, Scotch has produced highly successful members of the Victorian Schools Team and the Australian Schools Team, including Max Fan, who won the NSDC competition with Victoria and then captained the Australian team in 2021 at WSDC, and Josh Qin, representing Australia at WSDC 2023. In 2025, Scotch College's A Grade debating team reached the semi-finals of the Debaters Association of Victoria Schools Competition following a near-undefeated run. The team was defeated in the semi-final by eventual champion Wesley College. The result highlighted the strength of Scotch College's debating program.

== Sport ==
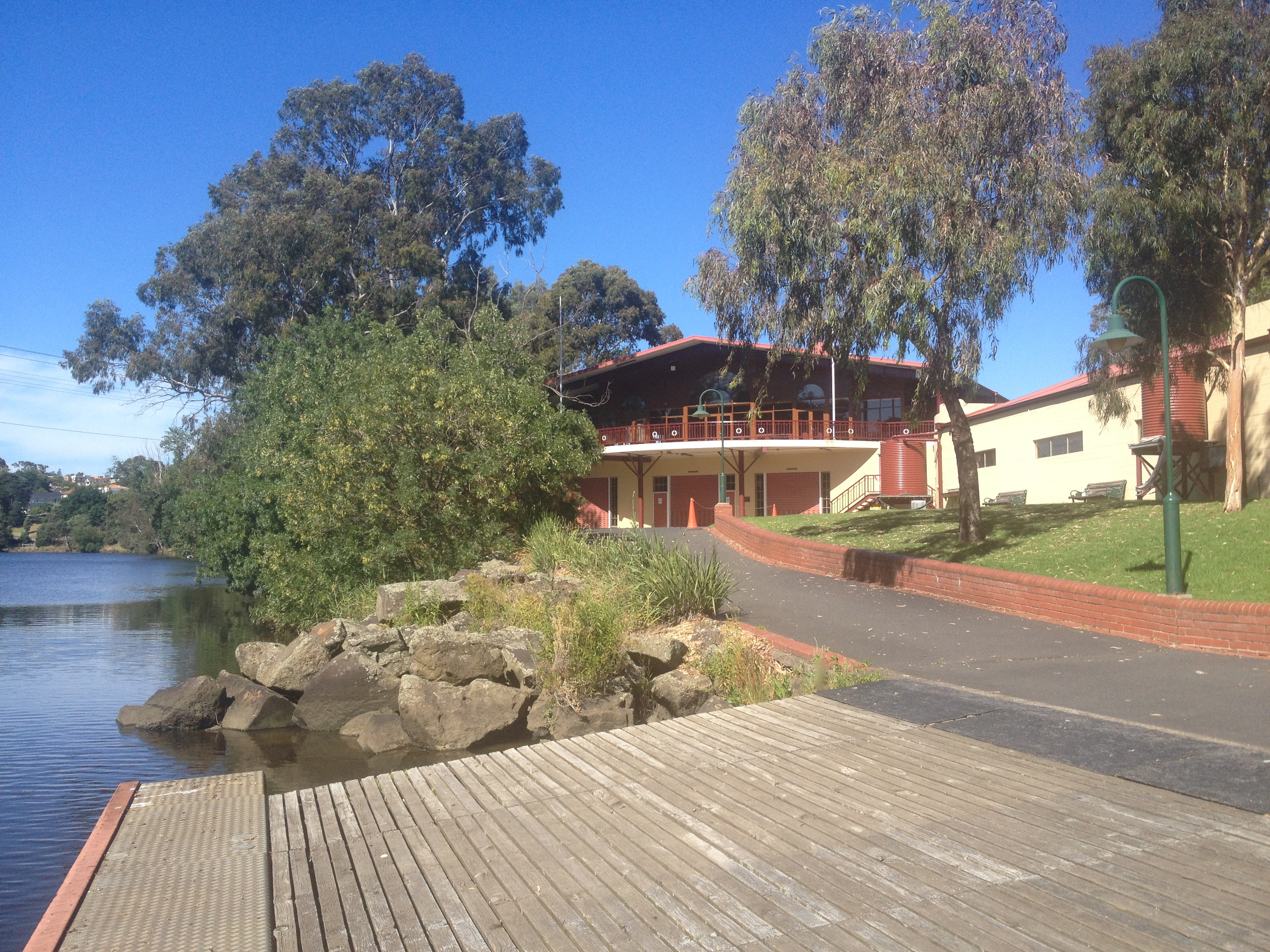
The school's boat ramp and boat houses are within the grounds of the Hawthorn campus on the Yarra River (2014)

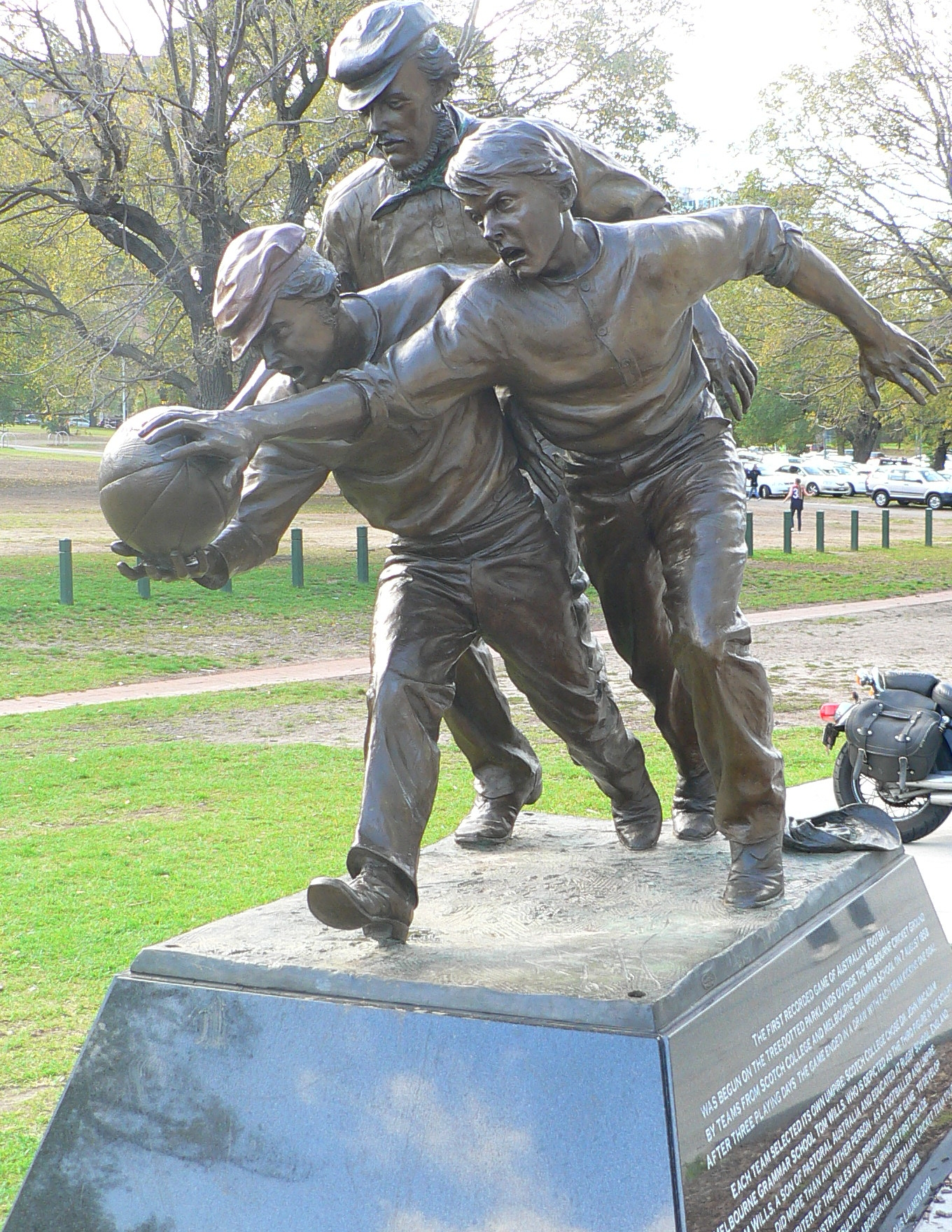
Statue at the Melbourne Cricket Ground of Tom Wills umpiring the first recorded match of Australian rules football between Scotch College and Melbourne Grammar

Scotch College competes in the Associated Public Schools of Victoria (APS) league in athletics, badminton, basketball, cricket, cross country, Australian rules football, hockey, rowing, rugby, soccer, squash, swimming and diving, table tennis, tennis, volleyball and water polo.

In addition to the APS competition, Scotch competes in a number of other sporting competitions, including:

- Henley Royal Regatta: In 2017 the first crew went to Henley Royal Regatta after winning the Head of the River and Australian Rowing Championships. They won the Princess Elizabeth Challenge Cup, becoming the first Victorian crew ever to win it and the third Australian crew. In 2019 the first crew again made the final of the Princess Elizabeth Challenge Cup, coming second to Eton College.
- Cordner–Eggleston Cup: This Cup is contested each year by the first football teams of Scotch and Melbourne Grammar School. It commemorates the first recorded game of Australian rules football, which was played between the two schools on 7 August 1858, which ended in a 1–1 draw and is today commemorated by a statue depicting the game outside the Melbourne Cricket Ground.
- The Batty Shield: This Shield is contested between the first cricket teams of Scotch and Eton College. The Shield was inaugurated in 2008 after a number of cricket tours between the schools, and is named after the ninth principal of Scotch who was previously a Housemaster at Eton, Mr I. Tom Batty.
- The Tait Cup: This Cup is contested between the first cricket teams of Scotch and Geelong Grammar School and commemorates the links between the schools back to their first cricket match in 1855.
- The John Roe Shield: This Shield is contested between the first soccer teams of Scotch and Saint Peter's College, Adelaide.
- The Colin Bell Trophy: This Trophy is contested between the first Rugby teams of Scotch and Melbourne Grammar School which recognises the first schoolboy game of Rugby played in Victoria in 1932.

=== APS Premierships ===
Scotch has won the following APS premierships:

- Athletics (21) – 1912, 1913, 1914, 1915, 1916, 1919, 1935, 1940, 1942, 1949, 1953, 1955, 1958, 1959, 1971, 1972, 1973, 1974, 1978, 2025, 2026
- Badminton (10) – 2004, 2005, 2006, 2007, 2008, 2011, 2012, 2013, 2014, 2015
- Basketball (3) – 1991, 1995, 2016
- Cricket (32) – 1891, 1892, 1893, 1894, 1898, 1899, 1900, 1901, 1902, 1911, 1915, 1922, 1928, 1938, 1941, 1942, 1945, 1952, 1955, 1956, 1958, 1964, 1973, 1978, 1981, 1987, 1994, 1996, 2003, 2012, 2017, 2019
- Cross Country (10) – 1992, 1994, 1995, 1998, 2000, 2001, 2002, 2003, 2005, 2021
- Football (36) – 1891, 1892, 1894, 1895, 1896, 1897, 1898, 1900, 1901, 1906, 1911, 1913, 1916, 1930, 1932, 1939, 1942, 1943, 1945, 1947, 1952, 1953, 1954, 1956, 1958, 1966, 1968, 1969, 1970, 1971, 1974, 1978, 1980, 1989, 1996, 2006
- Futsal (3) – 2016, 2017, 2024
- Hockey (12) – 1992, 1996, 1997, 1999, 2000, 2001, 2002, 2003, 2008, 2009, 2024, 2025
- Rowing (50) – 1868, 1869, 1872, 1873, 1875, 1876, 1879, 1881, 1884, 1891, 1892, 1899, 1900, 1907, 1908, 1919, 1921, 1925, 1926, 1927, 1941, 1946, 1951, 1952, 1963, 1966, 1967, 1969, 1973, 1978, 1992, 1998, 2004, 2005, 2006, 2007, 2008, 2010, 2011, 2012, 2013, 2014, 2015, 2017, 2018, 2019, 2020 *less participation, 2022, 2023, 2025, 2026
- Soccer (3) – 1992, 1994, 2016
- Swimming (8) – 1990, 1991, 1992, 1993, 1994, 1995, 1996, 1997
- Swimming & Diving* (3) – 1999, 2000, 2001
- Table Tennis – 2003
- Tennis (4) – 1988, 1989, 2019, 2021
- Volleyball (2) – 2012, 2022
- Water Polo (3) – 2004, 2011, 2012

*From 1998 until 2013, swimming and diving events were awarded as a single premiership.

== Alumni ==
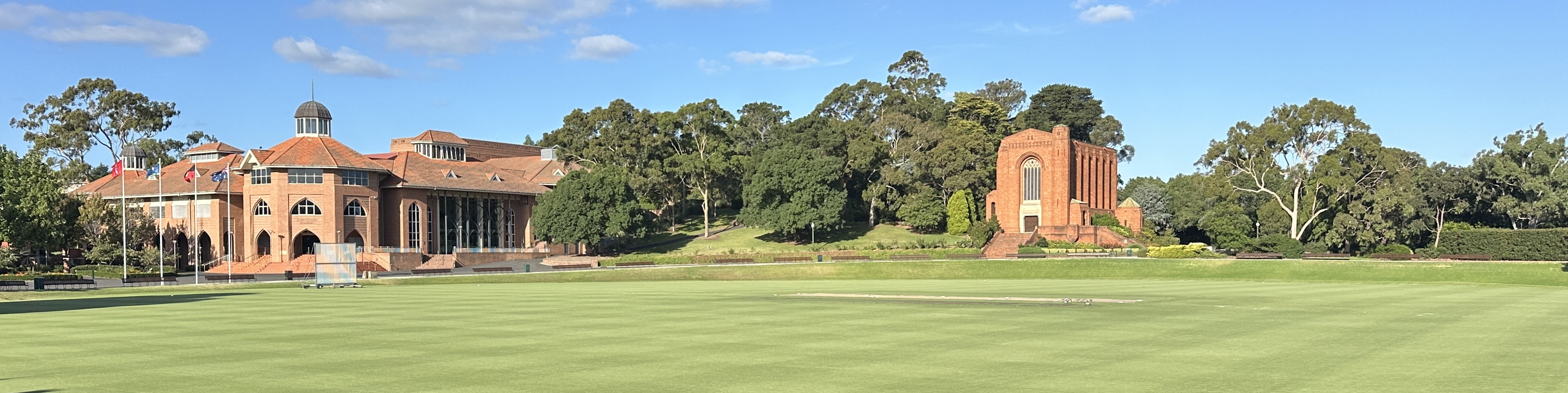
Main oval showing "The Hill" which is the boarding precinct above the James Forbes Academy and the Littljohn Memorial Chapel

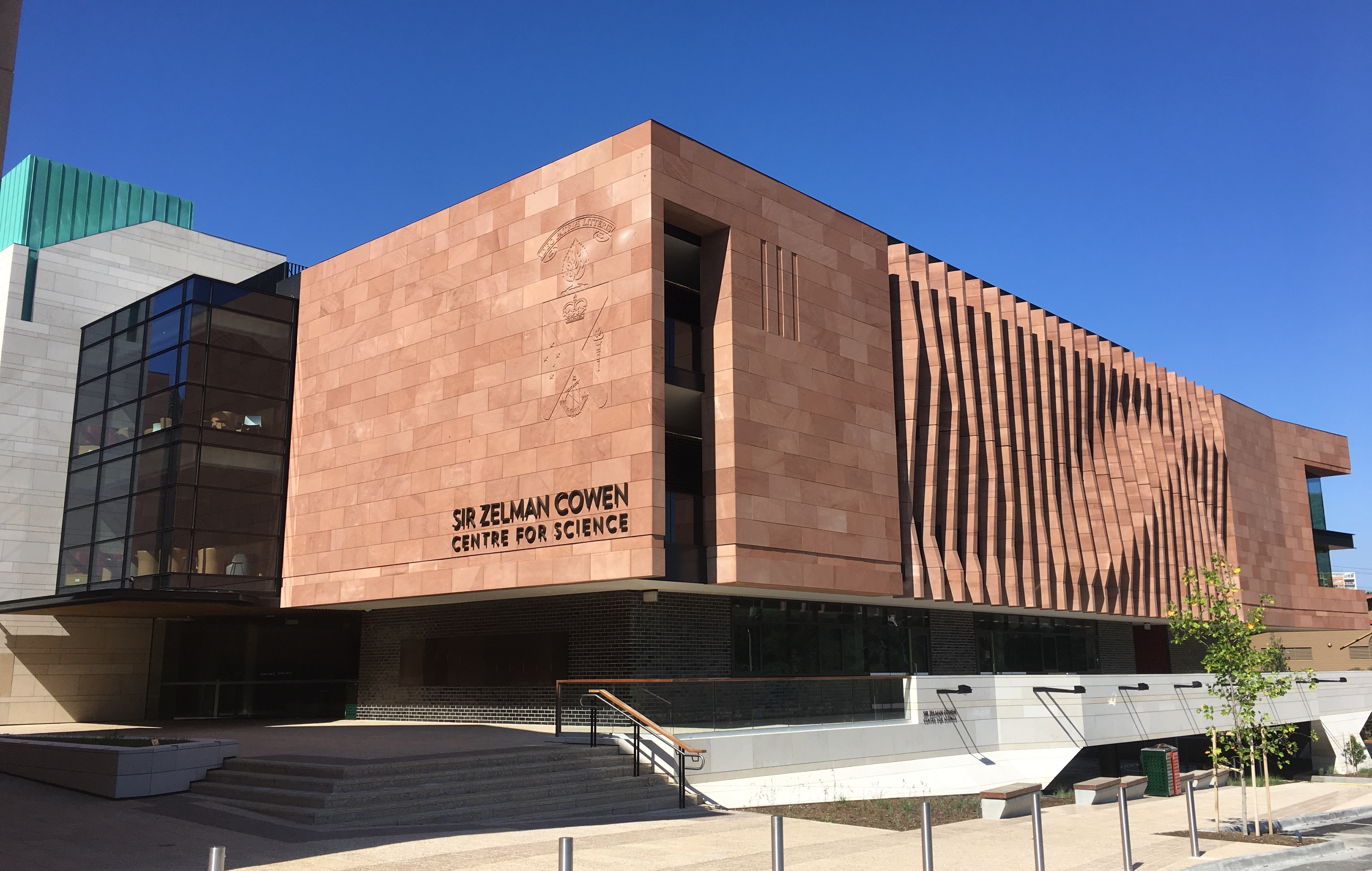
The Sir Zelman Cowen Centre for Science (2017)

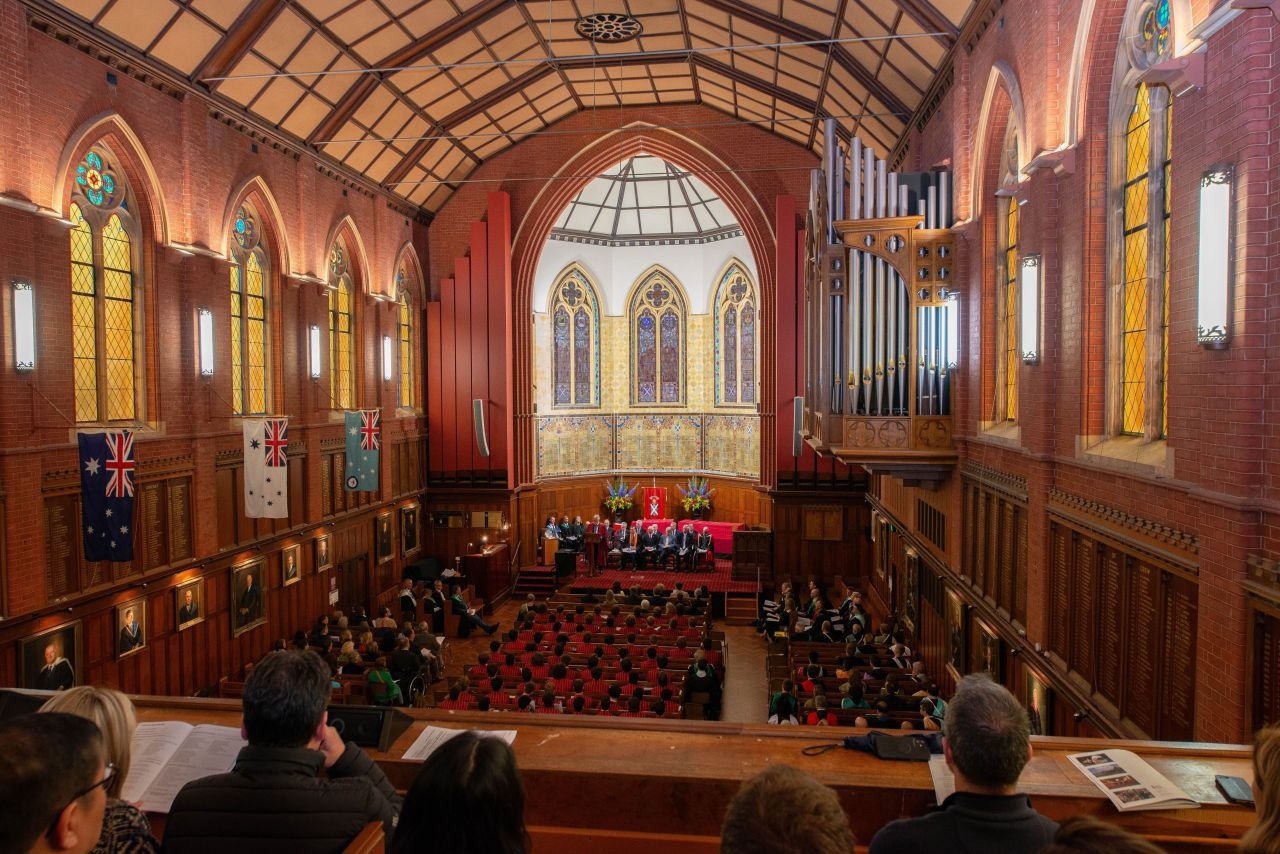
Interior of the Memorial Hall

Alumni of Scotch College are known as Old Boys or Old Collegians, and automatically become members of the School's alumni association, the Old Scotch Collegians' Association (OSCA).

Studies over the years have found that Scotch College had more alumni mentioned in Who's Who in Australia (a listing of notable Australians) than any other school. In 2010 The Age reported that Scotch College "has educated more of Australia's most honoured and influential citizens than any other school in the nation", based on research that revealed its alumni had received more top (Companion) Order of Australia honours than any other school. Although knighthoods are no longer bestowed in Australia, at least 71 Scotch College alumni have been knighted.

Alumni of Scotch College include:

- Three Governors-General of Australia – Sir Zelman Cowen, Sir Ninian Stephen and Peter Hollingworth.
- Prime Minister of Australia - Sir George Reid.
- Four Justices of the High Court of Australia – including Chief Justice of Australia Sir John Latham.
- Chief of the Australian Defence Force - General Peter Gration.
- Governor of the Reserve Bank of Australia - Sir Harold Knight.
- Featured person on the Australian $100 note - Sir John Monash.
- Governor of Victoria - Sir Henry Winneke.
- Eight State Premiers of four states – including more recently John Cain (Vic), Jeff Kennett (Vic) and Jim Bacon (Tas).
- The eponyms of Monash University and Murdoch University.
- Ten university Vice-Chancellors - including Sir Kenneth Wheare of Oxford University.
- Three times Olympic gold medalist - Drew Ginn.
- Two BHP Chairmen – Sir Ian McLennan and Sir James Balderstone.
- World number 1 and two times Wimbledon singles tennis champion - Gerald Patterson.

== Images of Hawthorn campus ==
The Memorial Hall and James Forbes Academy around the Main Oval (2014)

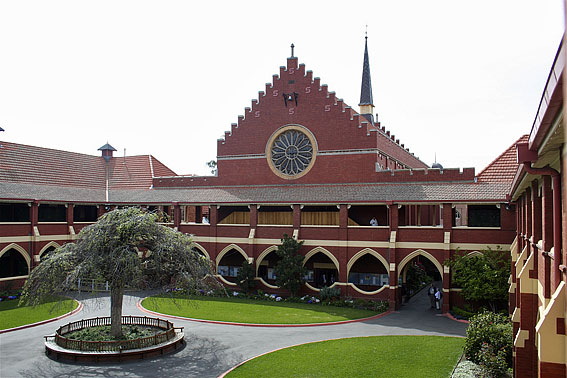
The Quadrangle at the school's current Hawthorn site (2009)

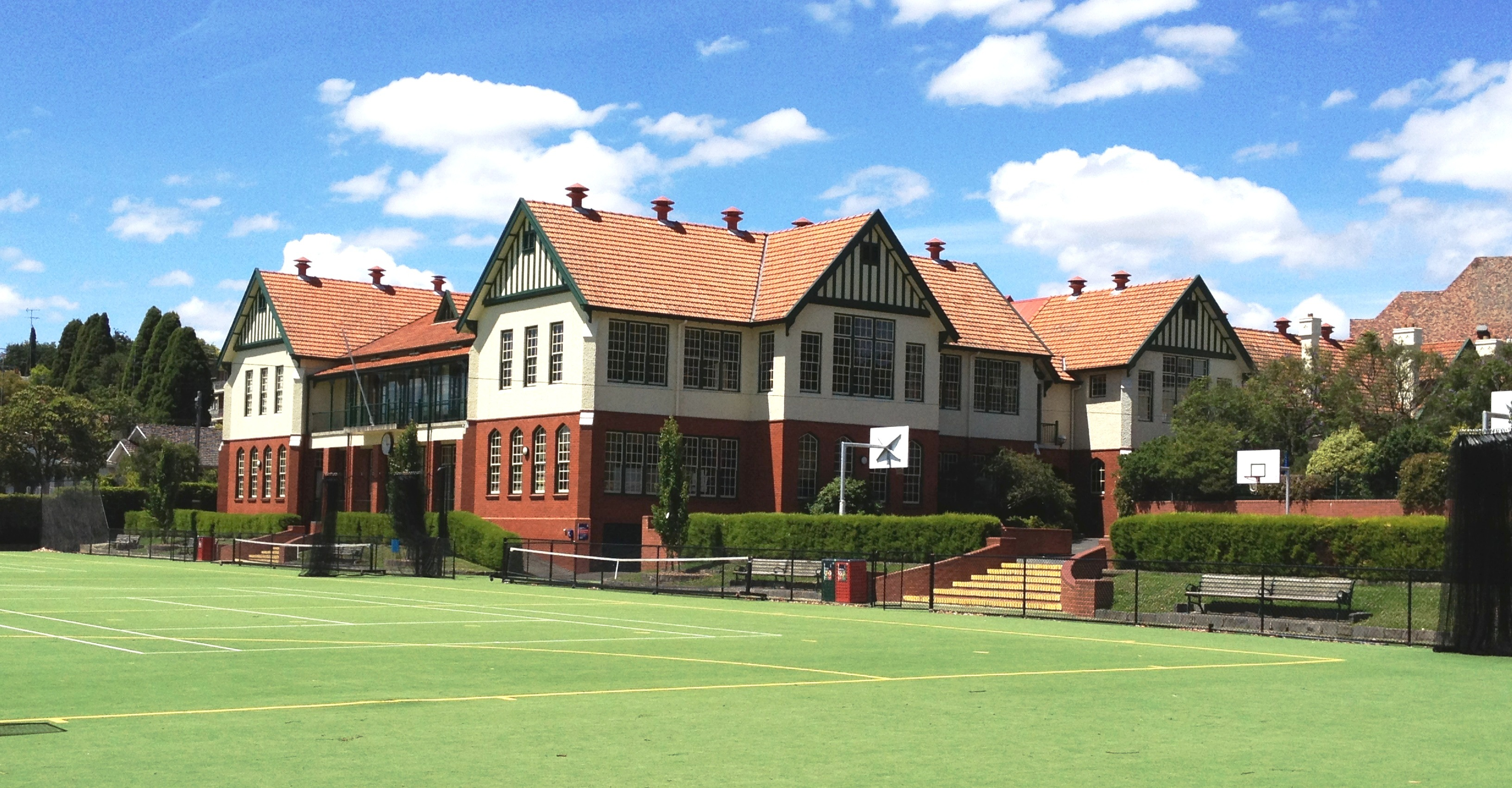
The Junior School (shown 2012) was the first part of the school to move to the current Hawthorn site

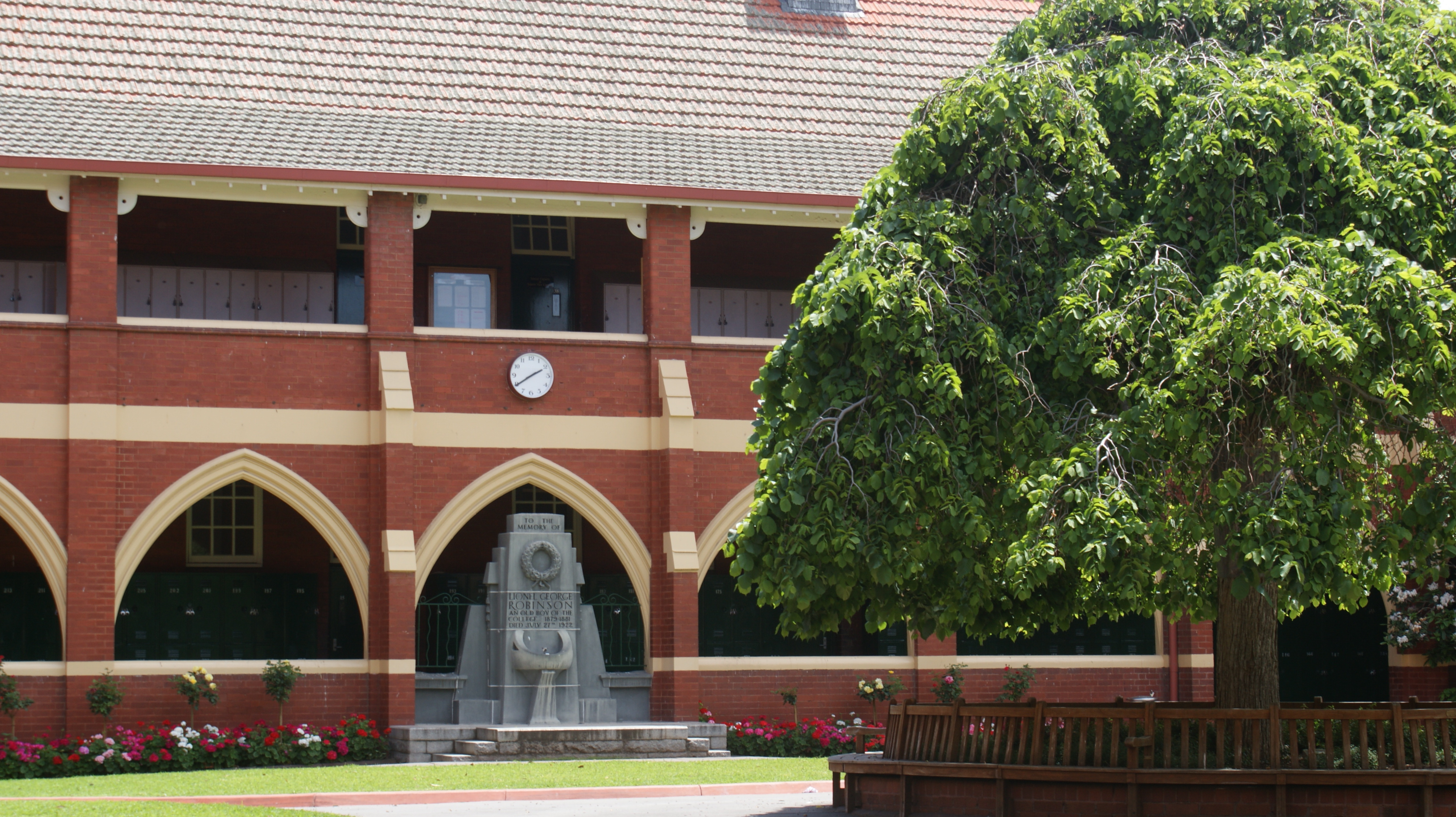
The weeping elm in The Quadrangle (2009)

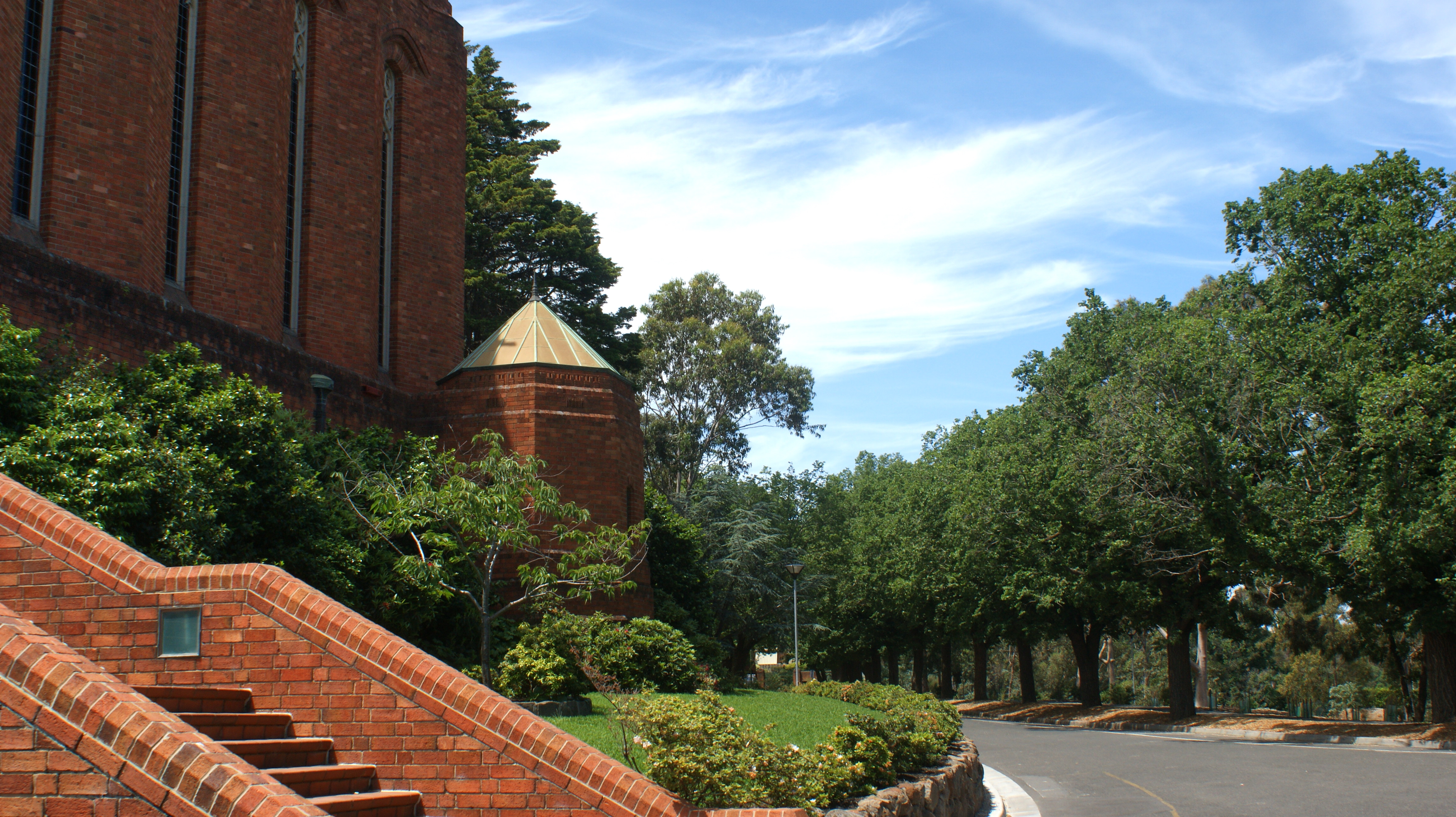
The elms of Monash Drive, named after Sir John Monash (2009)

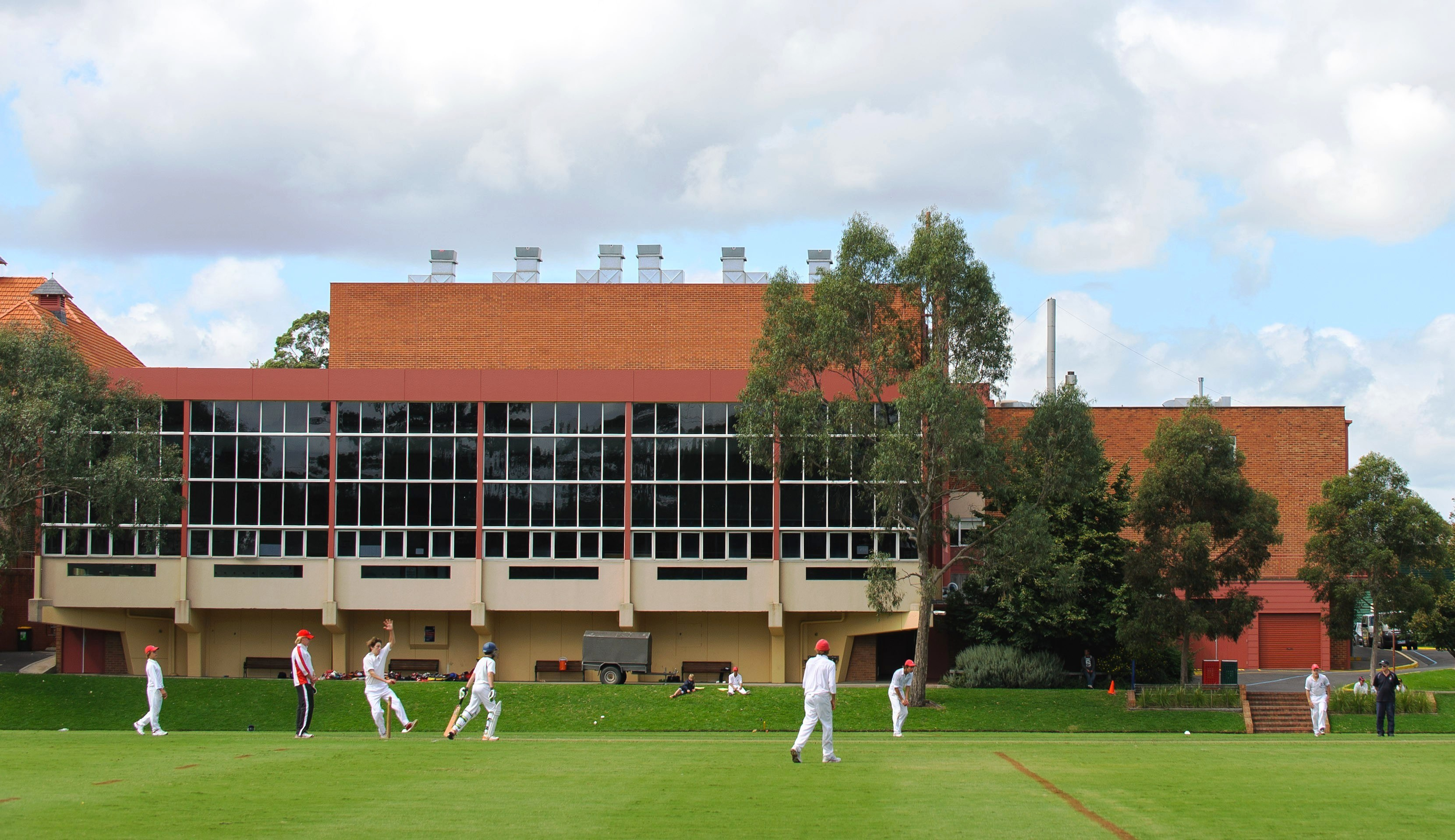
Looking into the indoor swimming pool in the Glenn Centre from the Meares Oval (2012)

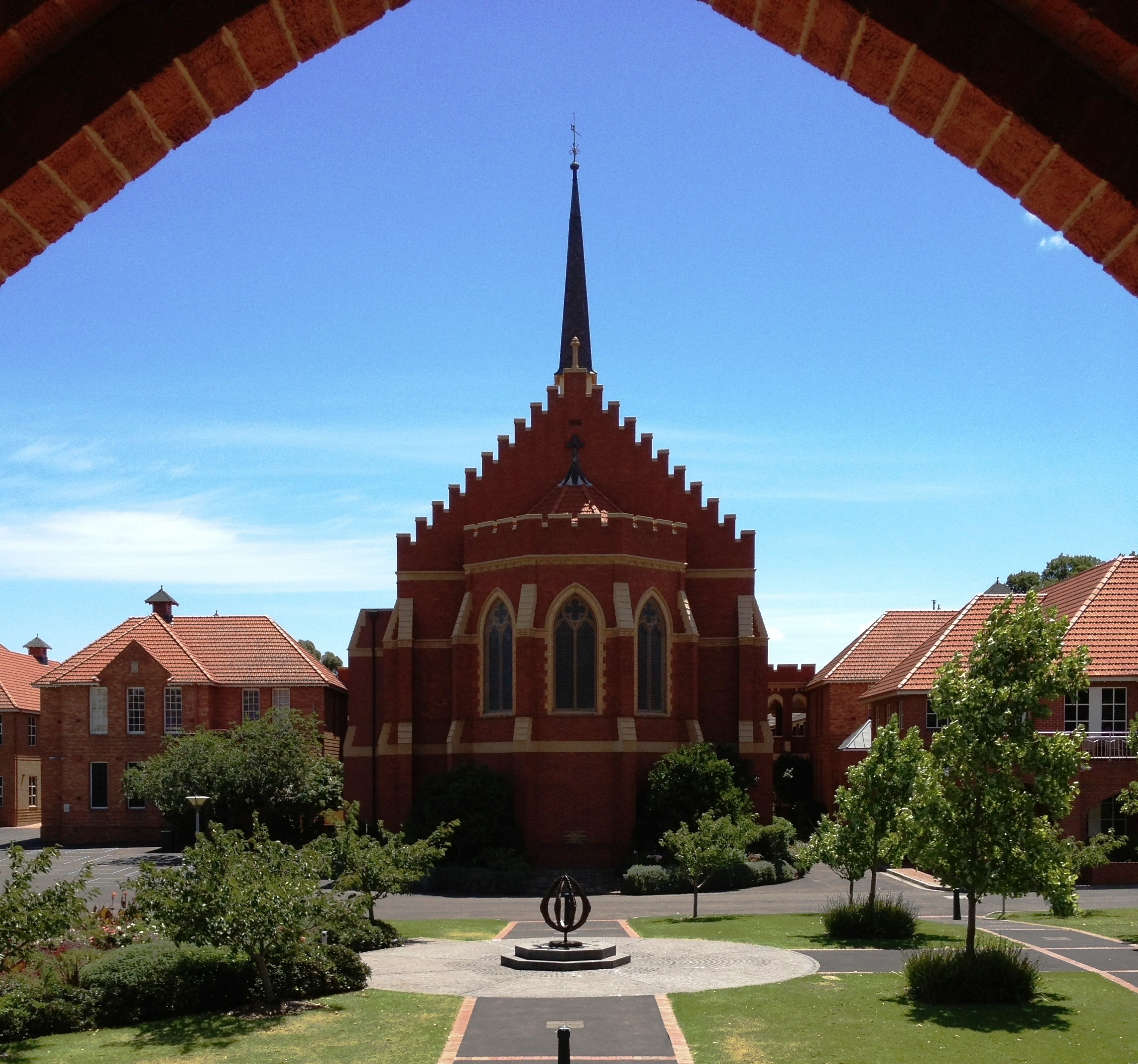
The Burning Bush sculpture is in the Old Scotch Square (2012)

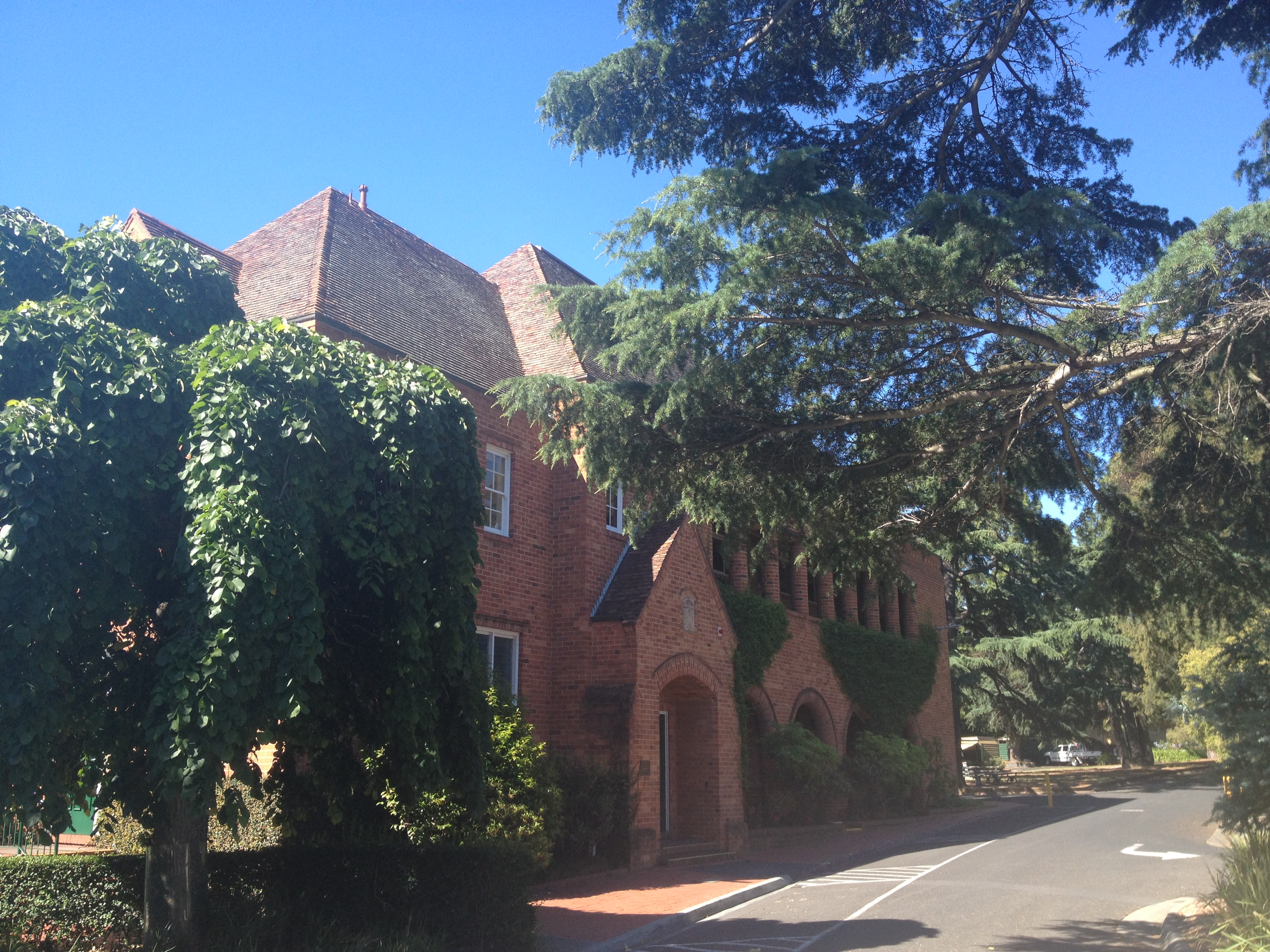
The Shergold Building is part of the Junior School

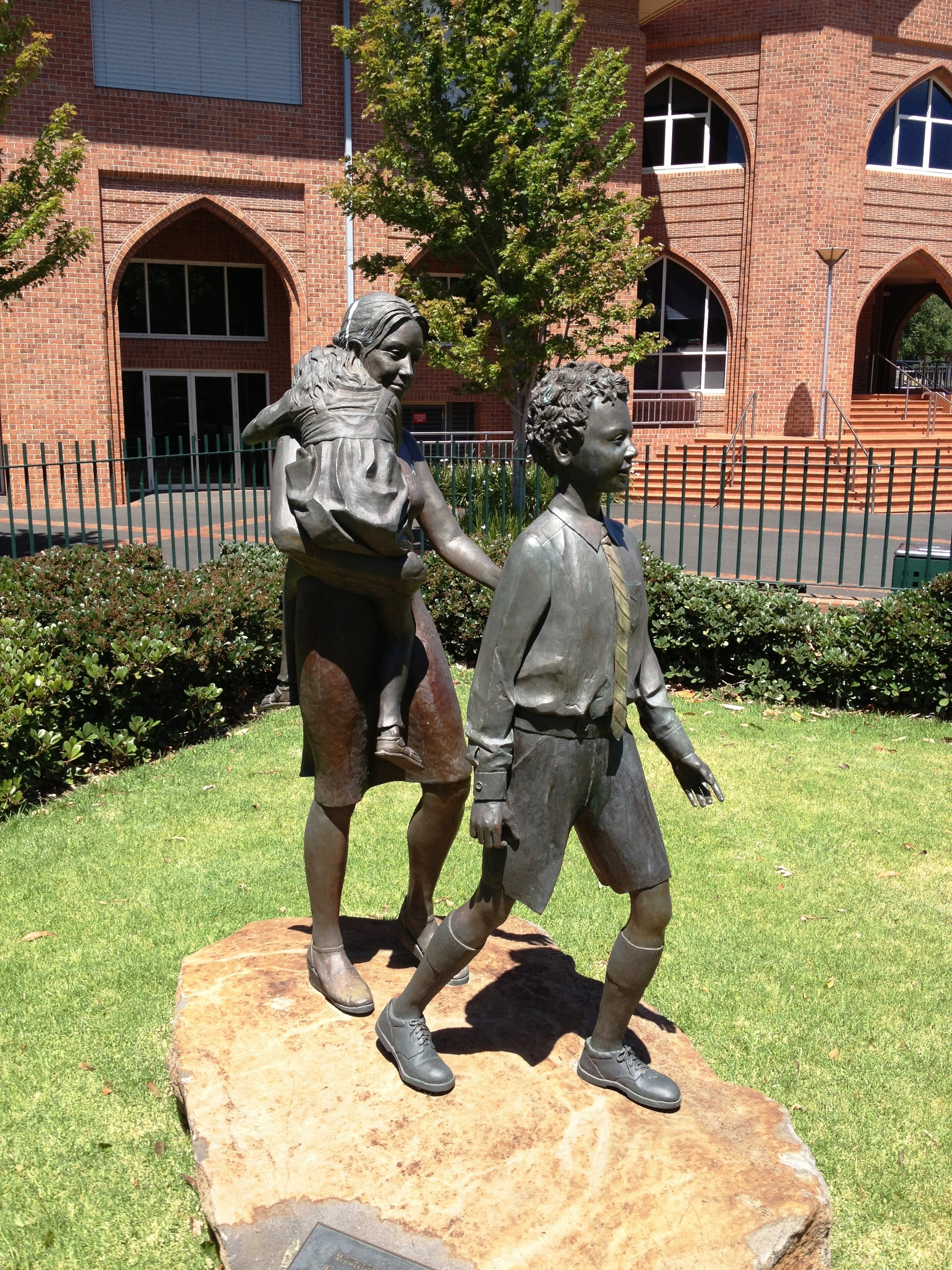
The "Mother and Son" sculpture

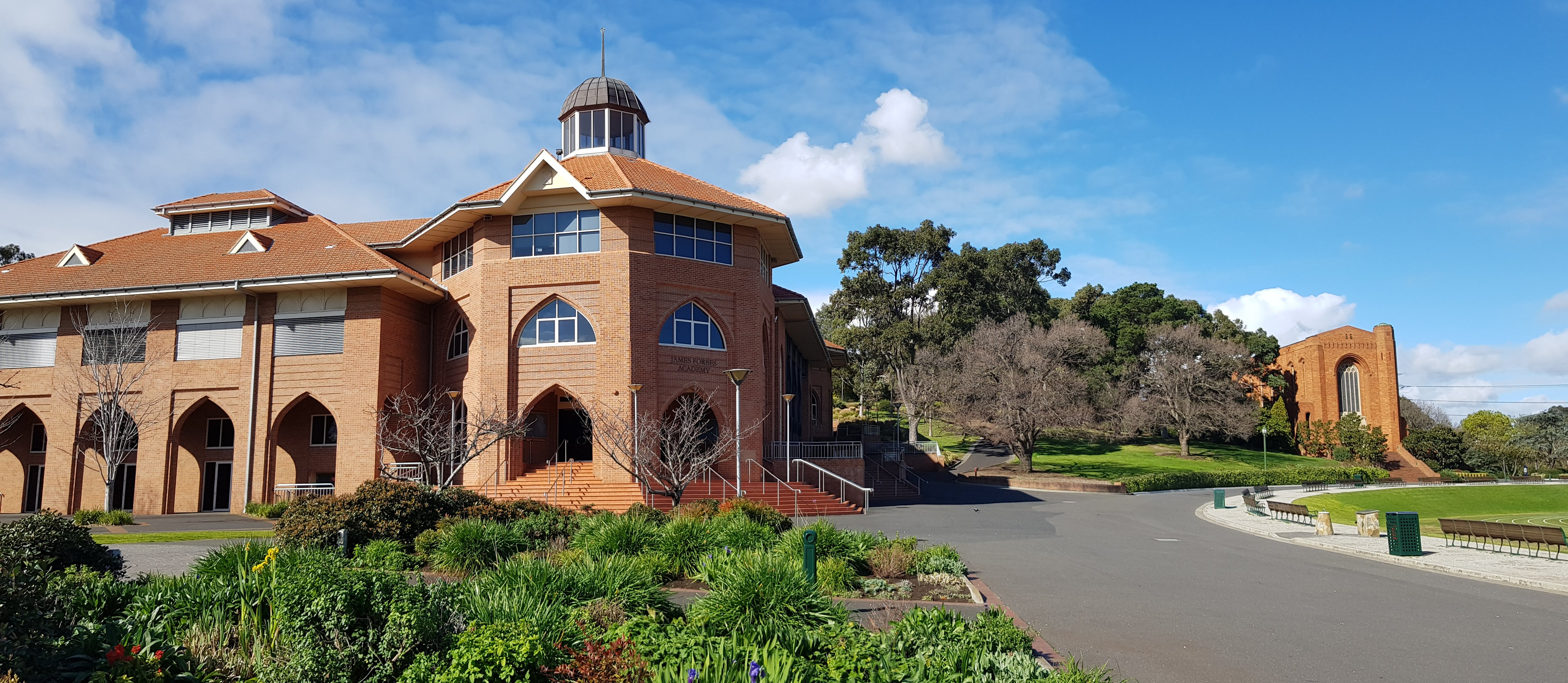
The James Forbes Academy overlooking the Main Oval and the Littlejohn Chapel in the distance (2019)

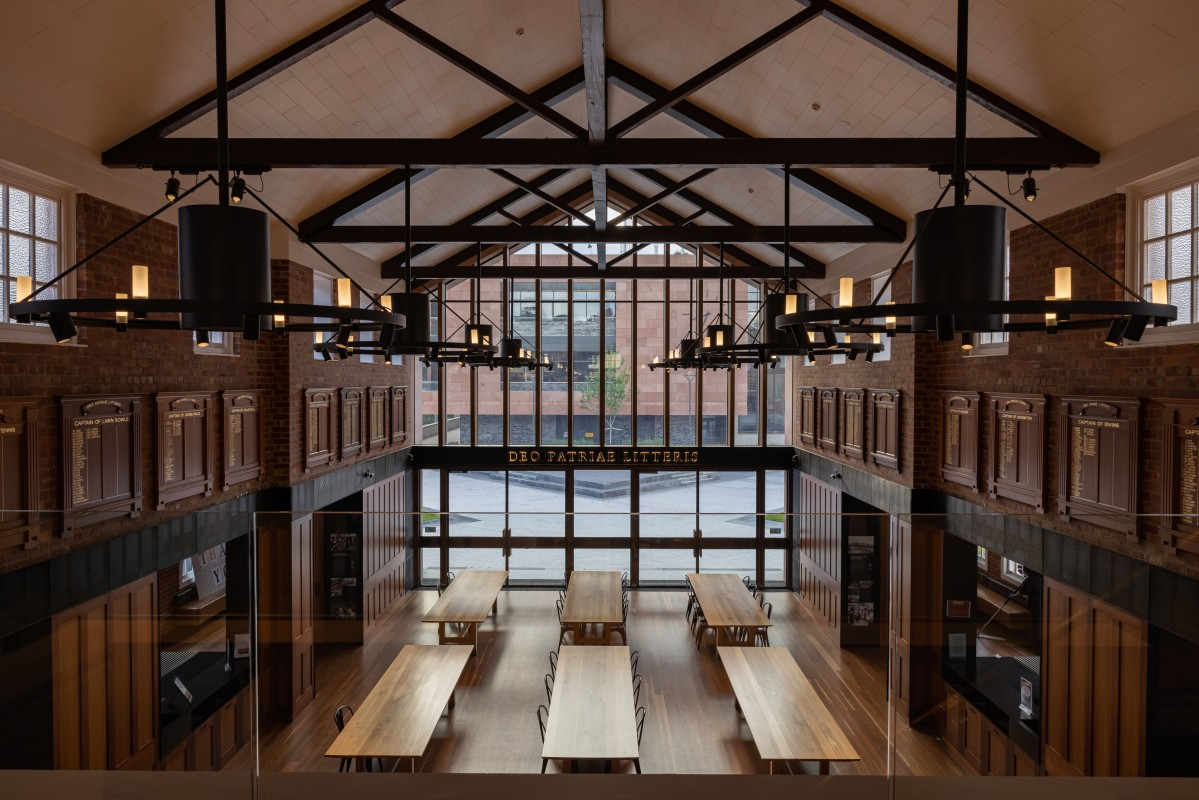
Keon-Cohen dining hall – the student tuck shop

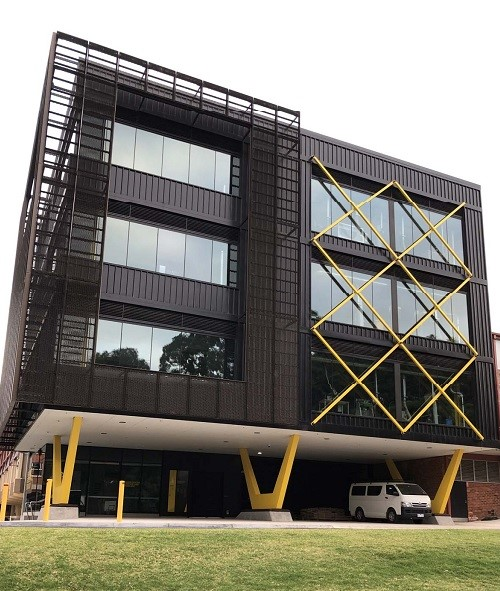
Spencer Centre for Design and Technology

== See also ==
- Old Scotch Football Club
- List of schools in Victoria, Australia
- List of high schools in Victoria
- Victorian Certificate of Education
