= Alexander Rowan Macneil =

Australian military officer, chaplain and Scout Leader (1894–1953)

The Reverend Alexander Rowan Macneil MC & Bar ED
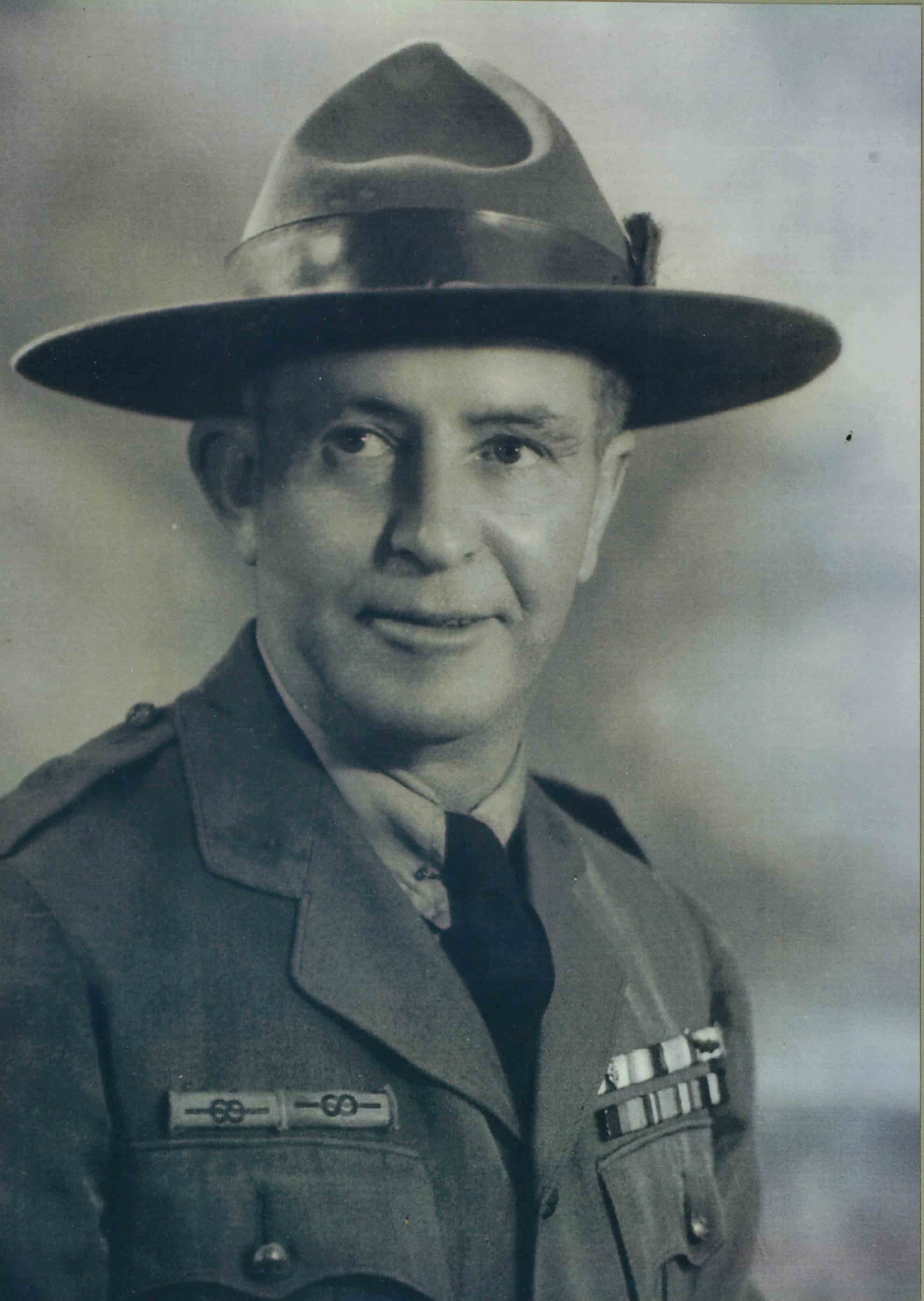
- Macneil in uniform as a Scout Commissioner
- Born: 27 February 1894; Hawthorn, Victoria
- Died: 14 October 1953 (aged 59); Kew, Victoria
- Resting place: Springvale Botanical Cemetery
- Education: Scotch College, Melbourne
- Alma mater: University of Melbourne
- Occupation: Minister of religion
- Employer: Presbyterian Church of Victoria
- Known for: Establishing Scouting in Japanese prisoner of war camps during WW2
- Notable work: The Story of the Twenty-First; Bamboo Thumbsticks
- Military service
- Allegiance: Australia
- Branch: Australian Army
- Service years: 1913 – 1953
- Rank: Chaplain 4th Class
- Service number: VX39150
- Units: 48th Battalion; 21st Battalion; 24th Battalion; 2/29th Battalion
- Commands: Melbourne University Rifles
- Memorials: Australian Ex-Prisoners of War Memorial; Balwyn War Memorial; Changi Rover Crew Memorial

Signature
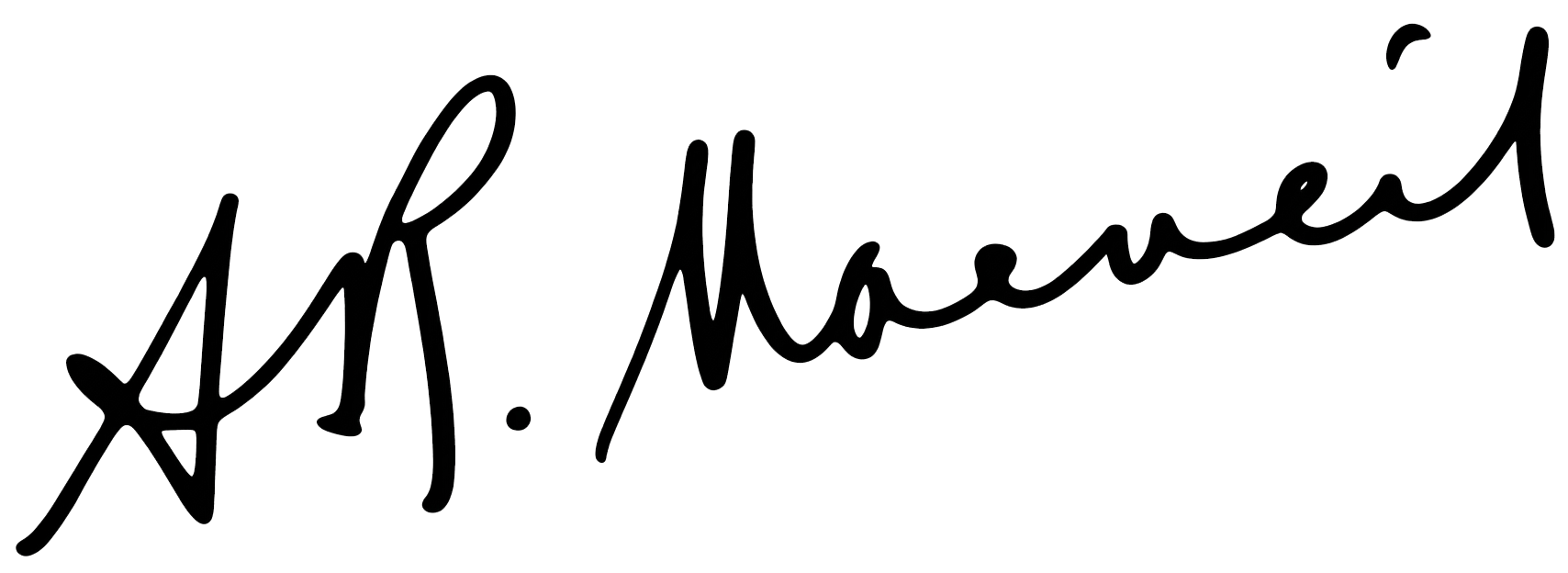

The Reverend Alexander Rowan Macneil MC & Bar ED (27 February 1894 – 14 October 1953) known as Rowan "Padre" Macneil was an Australian army officer, chaplain and scout leader.

During World War I he was twice awarded the Military Cross. He became a Presbyterian minister and continued his scouting involvement in the interwar period, and was a military chaplain in World War II. During the second war, Macneil was interred at the Changi prisoner-of-war camp. At the time of his death, Macneil was the Presbyterian Church of Victoria's senior chaplain and a field commissioner of Scouts Victoria.

== Early life ==
Alexander Rowan Macneil was born on 27 February 1894 in Hawthorn, Victoria, to Alexander Macneil (c. 1857–1934), chairman of the ironmongery firm Briscoe and Company Limited, and his wife Jane (c. 1862–1932; née Peden). Named for his father, but known as Rowan, Macneil had five siblings: Edith, Jim, Sheila, Alan and Jean.

Macneil attended Scotch College and represented the school at Associated Public Schools of Victoria's athletics and shooting competitions in 1910 and 1911. In 1911, he was the state's shooting champion and also a member of the school's premiership-winning first XVIII football team.

Working as an ironmonger after leaving Scotch College, Macneil was commissioned as a second lieutenant in the Australian Militia in 1913. He was promoted to lieutenant in February 1915 after three years in the Militia and transferred to the First AIF.

== Military service, World War I ==
Macneil was assigned to the 21st Infantry Battalion on 28 April 1915. Part of 6th Brigade, 2nd Division, the battalion embarked on HMAT Ulysses on 9 May 1915. On arrival at Alexandria on 29 August 1915, it joined the Mediterranean Expeditionary Force and after a period of training dispatched to Gallipoli as reinforcements. En route the battalion's transport, HMT Southland, was torpedoed by German submarine UB-14 near Lemnos and the passengers and crew were forced to abandon ship. The battalion eventually arrived at ANZAC Cove on 7 September. Following this they undertook mainly defensive duties along the Australian line until December 1915, when they were evacuated from Gallipoli after the decision was made to withdraw Allied forces from the peninsula.

After a brief stint guarding the Suez Canal Zone, the battalion was assigned to the Western Front. On 1 July 1916, Macneil was mentioned in dispatches after participating in a raid on the German trenches in June 1916. He was promoted to captain on 23 July, the first day of the Battle of Pozieres. During the battle he was wounded in action on 26 August 1916 and received the Military Cross on 20 October 1916 for his actions:

For conspicuous gallantry in action. Though wounded he stuck to the command of his company till wounded a second time on the same afternoon. He set a fine example to his men under fire.

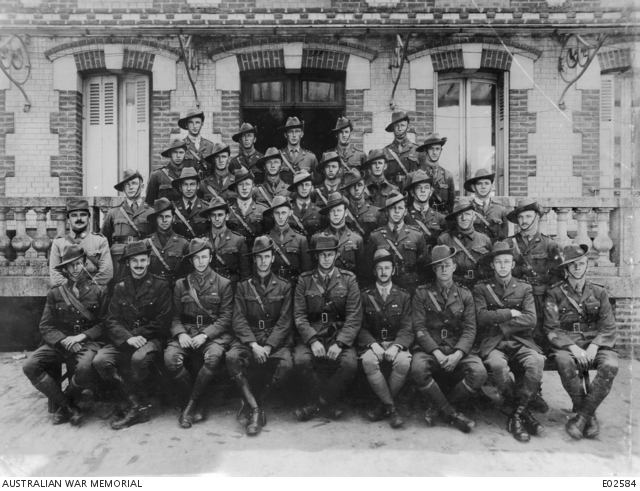
21st Battalion officers in France, 1918. Macneil 3rd from left, front row.

Macneil had been evacuated to England on 5 September 1916, returning to the 21st Battalion after a period of convalescence on 24 November. He participated in the Second Battle of Bullecourt in May 1917 before being detached to the 6th Australian Infantry Training Battalion in England that August. Macneil returned to his battalion on 8 March 1918, in time to face the German spring offensive and the allies' Hundred Days Offensive in response. Participating in the battles of Hamel and Amiens, he was awarded a bar to his Military Cross on 18 June 1918 for leading an attack at Ville-Sur-Ancre, near Albert on 19 May:

For conspicuous gallantry and devotion to duty. On reaching his objective in an attack, after two of his officers had become casualties, this officer supervised the digging in of his company. Later, after reaching the second objective, he reconnoitred the front positions, and finding that they could not be held, he skilfully withdrew his company, pushing out Lewis gun posts. In the evening he went forward and finally dug in. He displayed coolness and judgment under trying conditions.

Following his second Military Cross, Macneil was temporarily promoted to major on 5 August 1918, relinquishing the appointment on 7 September when he was evacuated to England after being gassed the day before the Battle of Mont Saint-Quentin. Macneil briefly rejoined his battalion on 30 September, in time for the attack at Montbrehain – the final Australian action of the war. When the 21st Battalion was disbanded on 13 October, Macneil transferred to the 24th Battalion and returned to Australia aboard HMAT Euripides, disembarking in Melbourne on Anzac Day 1919.

== Interwar period ==
Soon after returning to Australia, Macneil edited the 21st Battalion's official history The Story of the Twenty-First, which was published in 1920 by the 21st Battalion Association.

After the war, Macneil transferred to the Australian Militia Forces, serving with the Melbourne University Rifles.

During his studies toward a Master of Arts at the university, Macneil married Alice Margaret Allan (Note: Alice's mother was Stella Allan (née Henderson), who possessed an MA and LLB (Uni NZ), attended the fifth League of Nations Assembly in Geneva in 1925 as a substitute delegate, and was known to Melbourne's Argus newspaper readers by the nom de plume 'Vesta'. She was the first woman permitted to get an LLB in New Zealand. Her father, Edwin Frank Allan, a lead writer at The Argus died in February 1922.) at St Paul's Cathedral, Melbourne on 7 August 1923. They had two children, James and Joan.

After graduation in 1924, Macneil continued to study divinity at Ormond College, Melbourne. He was promoted to lieutenant-colonel and took command of the Melbourne University Rifles in 1926, before transferring to the inactive list on being ordained as a Presbyterian minister in July 1928 (having been licensed as a minister in December 1926). He served as chaplain of Scotch College, Melbourne until 1935, during which time he established the 1st Hawthorn Scout Group at the request of the school's principal. Macneil was nicknamed "Spray" by the schoolboys due to his pronunciation of "let us pray".

Macneil was a major contributor to the first Australian Scout Jamboree, held in 1935 at Frankston, Victoria, serving as assistant jamboree camp chief in charge of activities. To recognise his efforts, he was awarded the Medal of Merit by the founder of Scouting, Baden-Powell of Gilwell, at the conclusion of the event.

After a two-year sabbatical in the United Kingdom to study educational methods, health, and housing, Macneil and his family returned to Melbourne early in January 1937. He joined the staff of Trinity Grammar and was appointed headquarters commissioner for Scouts (Note: Scouts Victoria has since renamed headquarters commissioner positions to state commissioner.) in 1937, remaining in the positions until he enlisted in the Second AIF in 1940.

== Military service, World War II ==
Macneil enlisted in the Second AIF on 6 December 1940, being appointed as Chaplain (4th Class) in the Australian Army Chaplains' Department on 14 December and attached to the 2/29th Battalion. Part of the 27th Brigade, 8th Division, the battalion sailed from Melbourne on 30 July 1941, arriving in Singapore on 15 August 1941.

Macneil was the AIF's senior Presbyterian chaplain in Malaya at the time of the Fall of Singapore. He was interred as a prisoner of war at Changi Gaol along with the other members of the British Empire forces who were captured. He advertised for fellow Scout Leaders on his first day in the camp, seeking to deliver the Wood Badge training course to them, and to other interested prisoners of war to prepare them for their life after liberation. Like many clubs started within the camp, the Scout training club had strong take-up initially, but interest dwindled and Macneil reformed it into the Changi Rover Crews.

The Rover Scout model was a much greater success, and Macneil soon found himself Group Scoutmaster of the Changi Group of Rover Scouts. This consisted of Somers Rover Crew, Tanah Merah Rover Crew and Java Rover Crew. As a deputy camp chief, Macneil was authorised to deliver Wood Badge leader training, allowing him to share the burden of leading the group. Fifty-five prisoners of war were invested as Rover Scouts at Changi, 27 of whom were later moved to other prisoner of war camps by the Japanese. In their new prison camps, these Rovers would establish new Rover Crews of their own, including the Menum Kwa Noi Rover Crew on the Thai–Burma Railway and Formosa International Rover Crew in Shirakawa Prisoner of War Camp in Taiwan. In each case, the Rovers continued to work to develop themselves, build morale and care for the sick, operating under the leadership of the Senior British Officer. Several hundred interred servicemen eventually became Rover Scouts under the auspices of Macneil's initial cohort.

While scouting was prohibited by the Japanese, the effect on morale of the Rovers' efforts to turn out as smartly as possible and to keep healthy, clean and cheerful had a marked effect on the spirits of the men. Macneil had aimed to provide the young soldiers with the kind of older brotherly mentorship that they were missing out on in the prison camp, but the senior officers all remarked on the positive effect that their dedicated service had throughout the camps.

Macneil considered that while it was not possible to go camping in the prison camp, the Rover Scouts he worked with during the Second World War were some of the truest scouters he had been involved with. Despite a 28-year involvement with scouting before the war, including an appointment as deputy chief commissioner and serving as field commissioner for the 1948 Pan-Pacific Jamboree at Yarra Brae in Wonga Park, Victoria, Macneil wrote in 1948 that he planned to request the honorary appointment of Group Scoutmaster, Changi Group of Rover Scouts when he finally retired from active participation in scouting.

Macneil was interred until the camp was liberated by the Indian 5th Division on 5 September 1945.

== Later years ==
After returning to Australia, Macneil wrote an account of his time in Changi, Scouting in Bondage. He also contributed to Bamboo Thumbsticks, a wider account of scouting in the Japanese prisoner of war camps.

He continued to serve as an army chaplain, receiving the Efficiency Decoration in 1946 in recognition of his twenty years of service as "an efficient and thoroughly capable" army reserve officer.

Macneil was, with C. W. Game, appointed a field commissioner by Scouts Victoria to deliver the 1948 Pan-Pacific Jamboree, then the largest scout event ever held in the Southern Hemisphere (over 11,000 scouts from more than 20 countries attended). Macneil, a former headquarters commissioner for Scouts, was also leader of the Victorian contingent of 5,000 Scouts. Later that year, in November 1948, he held the first communion in the newly dedicated Warriors' Chapel at Saint Andrew's Church, Forrest, Australian Capital Territory honouring the 10 000 members killed in World Wars I and II. Macneil represented the Ministers of Australia. he was the only Presbyterian chaplain from the Eighth Division from Victoria to return post-war; and used the same chalice and order of service as when he was the Changi camp chaplain.

In 1952, the Australian Government distributed funds to former prisoners of war held by the Japanese forces. Macneil called upon his fellow prisoners to donate their payments to Japanese Christians.

Macneil died suddenly in his home at 16 Alfred Street, Kew (and formerly 30 Wrixon Street, Kew) on 14 October 1953 after a period of illness, survived by his wife and two children. His funeral was held at Paton Memorial Presbyterian Church in Deepdene, Victoria, followed by cremation.

His wife Alice died in 1991, aged 88 years.

== Recognition ==
Macneil's service is commemorated on the Australian Ex-Prisoners of War Memorial at Ballarat, and the Balwyn War Memorial.

Macneil was recognised for his work as group scoutmaster in Changi by the Scout Association with the Medal for Meritorious Conduct, presented by the Lieutenant-Governor of Victoria in 1947. The medal, introduced in 1946, is usually awarded "in recognition of courage under great suffering".

Between 1957 and 2015, 1st Hawthorn Scout Group met at the Rowan Macneil Scout Hall, on the grounds of Scotch College.

In 1988, Scouts Victoria placed a memorial plaque in the chapel of the Changi Prison. When the building was demolished in 2004, this plaque was moved to the headquarters of the Singapore Scout Association.

=== Awards and decorations ===

Military Cross (1916) and bar (1918)
1914–15 Star (1920)
British War Medal (1920)
Victory Medal (1920) (with oakleaf device as mentioned in despatches)
1939–1945 Star (1946)
Pacific Star (1946)
Defence Medal (1946)
War Medal 1939–1945 (1946)
Australia Service Medal 1939–1945 (1946)
Efficiency Decoration (1946)
