= Grant Dibden =

Australian Anglican bishop

The Right Reverend Grant Dibden
- Bishop to the Australian Defence Force
- Church: Anglican Church of Australia
- Installed: 18 March 2020

Orders
- Ordination: 2004 (as deacon); 2010 (as priest) by Richard Hurford
- Consecration: 18 March 2020 by Philip Freier

Personal details
- Born: 1961 (age 64–65) Kariong, New South Wales
- Denomination: Anglican
- Spouse: Jeannette
- Children: 3
- Education: Royal Military College, Duntroon; Sydney Missionary and Bible College
- Military career
- Allegiance: Australia
- Branch: Australian Army
- Service years: 1979–2020
- Rank: Equivalent to Major-general
- Unit: Royal Australian Army Chaplains' Department

Grant Phillip Dibden (born 1961) is an Australian Anglican bishop and former military officer and chaplain, who has served as Anglican Bishop to the Australian Defence Force since 18 March 2020.

== Early life and military career ==
Dibden grew up in Kariong, New South Wales, where he was involved in Anglican churches from an early age.

He entered the Royal Military College, Duntroon in 1979 and upon graduation in 1982 moved was deployed in the Royal Australian Army Ordnance Corps. As a Lieutenant Colonel Dibden commanded the 7th Combat Service Support Battalion and was briefly deployed to East Timor. In December 2002 he was again promoted to Colonel and posted as the Commander Force Support Group. In this role Dibden was the lead logistic planner for Australia's deployment to the Solomon Islands, and he was briefly deployed there in 2003 to oversee the logistics plan there.

In November 2019, Dibden rejoined the regular Army for a final deployment, as he was nominated and accepted a posting as the Coordinating Chaplain for the Australian Defence Force in the Middle East Region, where he served for 2 months over the 2019 Christmas period.

== Ministry career ==
In 2004, Dibden left the army full-time to enter full-time Christian ministry. He was ordained deacon in 2004 and priest in 2010 in the Anglican Diocese of Bathurst. In 2005 he was appointed National Director of the Navigators in Australia. In this role he oversaw work in Tonga and India and held a number of roles for the Asia Pacific region. Dibden again took up military positions in 2007, transferring to the Royal Australian Army Chaplains' Department, within the Australian Army Reserve, where he voluntarily reduced his rank to Captain to enable this. Until his appointment as bishop Dibden held various Reserve Chaplain appointments, culminating in his final posting as the Senior Chaplain for 2nd. Division. immediately prior to his consecration as bishop.

== Episcopal ministry ==
On 11 February 2020, Dibden was appointed by the then Primate of the Anglican Church of Australia, Philip Freier and Chief of the Defence Force, Angus Campbell, as Anglican Bishop to the Australian Defence Force, replacing Bishop Ian Lambert who had retired in 2019. He was consecrated as bishop and installed as Anglican Bishop to the Australian Defence Force in the Duntroon Chapel on 18 March 2020.

Dibden's role as Bishop involves pastoral care of all Anglican chaplains in the Defence Force, which at the time of his appointment was 43 full-time chaplains, 43 part-time and another six in training. He also has responsibilities for recruiting military chaplains, making sure they are a good fit, and helping them transition back to their dioceses when they leave the service. Although as Bishop he cannot be a member of the Australian Defence Force, in the role he holds a rank equivalent to a major general.

== Personal life ==
Dibden is married to Jeanette and has three sons.

Anglican Communion titles
Preceded by Ian Lambert	Bishop to the Australian Defence Force; 2020–	Incumbent
