= Eacott =

Eacott is a surname. Notable people with the surname include:

- John Eacott (born 1960), British jazz trumpeter and composer
- Len Eacott (born 1947), Australian Anglican archbishop

== See also ==
- LazarBeam (born 1994), real name Lannan Eacott, professional gamer
