= Percy Haggitt =

Dean of Nelson (1934–1957)

Percy Bolton Haggitt (1878–1957) was the Dean of Nelson from 1934 until his death.

Haggitt was educated at the University of New Zealand and ordained in 1903. His first posts were curacies in Christchurch. He was Vicar of St John St Albans in the same city from 1906 to 1911, and then St Mary, Merivale. He was Archdeacon of Christchurch from 1918 until his appointment as Dean.
