= Frank Hulme-Moir =

The Right Reverend Frank Hulme-Moir AO
- Bishop of Nelson (1954–1965)
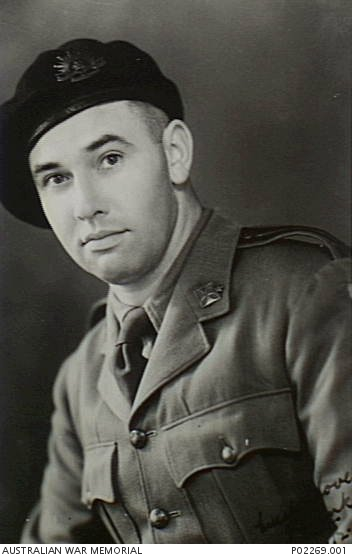
- Hulme-Moir in December 1940 as Church of England chaplain to the 6th Australian Division Cavalry Regiment
- Church: Anglican Church in Aotearoa, New Zealand and Polynesia
- Diocese: Diocese of Nelson
- In office: 1954–1965
- Predecessor: Percival Stephenson
- Successor: Peter Sutton
- Other posts: Dean of Sydney (1965–1967); Bishop coadjutor of Sydney (1965–1975); Bishop to the Armed Forces (1966–1975)

Orders
- Ordination: 1936 (as deacon); 28 February 1937 (as priest)
- Consecration: 11 June 1954, Christ Church Cathedral, Nelson by Reginald Owen

Personal details
- Born: Francis Oag Hulme-Moir; 30 January 1910 Balmain, Australia
- Died: 10 March 1979 (aged 69) Collaroy, New South Wales, Australia
- Denomination: Anglicanism
- Parents: Alexander Hugh Moir; Violet Beryl Hulme
- Spouse: Ena Dorothy Smee (m. 1936)
- Children: 2 sons, 1 daughter
- Occupation: Anglican priest and military chaplain
- Education: Moore Theological College

Francis Oag Hulme-Moir AO (30 January 1910, Balmain, Sydney, Australia – 10 March 1979, Sydney) was an Australian Anglican bishop and military chaplain, who served as the 7th Anglican Bishop of Nelson from 1954 to 1965, as Bishop to the Armed Forces from 1965 to 1975, as Dean of Sydney from 1965 to 1967 and coadjutor bishop of Sydney from 1965 to 1975.

Hulme-Moir was born on 30 January 1910, educated at Sydney Technical High School and ordained in 1937. He was a Chaplain to the Australian Armed Forces from then until 1947 when he became Archdeacon of Ryde. On 11 June 1954 he was ordained to the episcopate. On 23 February 1965, he was appointed 6th Dean of Sydney a post he relinquished in late 1966 but remained coadjutor bishop. Hulme-Moir was particularly noted for his booming bass voice and engaging personality.

Hulme-Moir received the Order of Australia in 1976.

He died on 10 March 1979 and his funeral was attended by full military honours.

Anglican Communion titles
Preceded by Percival William Stephenson	Bishop of Nelson; 1954–1965	Succeeded by Peter Eves Sutton
New title Inaugural appointment	Bishop to the Armed Forces; 1965–1979	Succeeded by Ken Short as Bishop to the Australian Defence Force
