= Charles Mules =

Anglican Bishop of Nelson, New Zealand (1837–1927)

Charles Oliver Mules (8 September 1837, Ilminster – 9 October 1927, Nelson, New Zealand) was the third Anglican Bishop of Nelson, whose Episcopate spanned a 20-year period during the late 19th and early 20th centuries.

He was educated at Cheltenham College and Trinity College, Cambridge, and ordained in 1864. After a curacy at Whorlton, County Durham he emigrated to New Zealand to work under Andrew Suter, Anglican Bishop of Nelson. He was Vicar of Brightwater then Archdeacon of Waimea before succeeding Suter. At some point he became a Doctor of Divinity.

After resigning his see he lived at Trafalgar Square in the city until his death on 9 October 1927. He is buried at St Michael's, Waimea West.

Anglican Communion titles
Preceded by Andrew Burn Suter	Bishop of Nelson; 1892–1912	Succeeded by William Charles Sadlier
