= Peter Sutton (bishop) =

New Zealand bishop (1923–2013)

The Rt Rev Peter Eves Sutton CBE OStJ (7 June 1923 – 23 March 2013) was a New Zealand Anglican church leader. He served as the 8th bishop of Nelson from 1965 until 1990.

== Biography ==
Born in Wellington in 1923, Sutton was educated at Nelson College from 1938 to 1940. He then studied at Canterbury University College, graduating with a Master of Arts degree in 1947. His thesis was on the student Christian movement in New Zealand. At Canterbury, Sutton won a university blue for golf and served as president of the student union.

Ordained in 1947, he began his career with curacies at Whanganui, St John the Evangelist Bethnal Green, and Bishops Hatfield. He was then Vicar of St Cuthberts, Berhampore (1952–58) and Whangārei (1958–64). He was Archdeacon of Waimate from 1962 to 1964 and then Dean of St. Paul's Cathedral, Dunedin. On 24 August 1965 he was consecrated to the episcopate and served as the eighth Bishop of Nelson for 25 years.

As bishop, Sutton was ex officio a member of the Cawthron Institute trust board and was its chairman for 10 years. He was an outspoken opponent of apartheid in South Africa and led a protest march in Nelson during the 1981 Springbok tour.

In 1985, Sutton was appointed an Officer of the Order of St John. Following his retirement as Bishop of Nelson, he was appointed a Commander of the Order of the British Empire in the 1990 Queen's Birthday Honours.

Sutton died in Nelson in 2013. Following his funeral service at Christ Church Cathedral, Nelson, he was buried in Marsden Valley Cemetery, Stoke.

Anglican Communion titles
Preceded by Francis Oag Hulme-Moir	Bishop of Nelson; 1965–1990	Succeeded by Derek Lionel Eaton
