= Ian Lambert =

Australian Anglican bishop

The Right Reverend Ian Lambert
- Assistant bishop, Canberra & Goulburn (2012–2013); Bishop to the Australian Defence Force (2013–2019)
- Church: Anglican Church of Australia
- Diocese: Canberra & Goulburn
- In office: 31 March 2012 – 2019

Orders
- Ordination: 30 November 1995 by George Browning
- Consecration: 31 March 2012 by Brian Farran

Personal details
- Born: Ian Keese Lambert; 1954 or 1955 (age 70–71)
- Spouse: Jill
- Children: 4

Ian Keese Lambert (born 1954/5) is an Australian Anglican bishop and former military officer, who served as an assistant bishop in the Anglican Diocese of Canberra and Goulburn from 2012 to 2013, and as Bishop to the Australian Defence Force from 2013 to 2019.

== Early life, military career and parish ministry ==
Lambert grew up in Canberra, where he attended Telopea Park High School and St Andrew's Presbyterian Church in Forrest.

After high school, Lambert attended the Royal Military College Duntroon, where he graduated in 1976 as a lieutenant in the Royal Australian Corps of Transport. He later attended the Royal Navy Staff College at HMAS Penguin in 1989.

While still in the military, Lambert commenced theological studies at St Mark's National Theological Centre initially on a part-time basis, and later was discharged from the military with the rank of major to complete his studies full-time. He was ordained deacon in the Anglican Church of Australia, and later was ordained priest by Bishop George Browning, on 30 November 1995.

Following his graduation, Lambert served in the Anglican Diocese of Canberra and Goulburn, first as curate at Cooma from 1995 to 1996, then was appointed rector of Batemans Bay in December 1996. While serving in Batemans Bay Lambert was appointed as area dean 2005, and from 2009 to 2012 served as archdeacon for the South Coast and Monaro.

== Episcopal ministry ==
In 2012, Lambert was appointed as assistant bishop in the Diocese of Goulburn and Canberra. He was consecrated as bishop, along with fellow assistant bishop Genieve Blackwell, by Bishop of Newcastle Brian Farran on 31 March 2012. As part of his role, he assisted Bishop Stuart Robinson with responsibility for the South Coast, Monaro and Snowy Regions, while maintaining his role as rector of Batemans Bay.

Lambert was installed as Anglican bishop to the Australian Defence Force on 5 July 2013 by Phillip Aspinall in the chapel at Duntroon. He replaced Bishop Len Eacott who had retired in December 2012 after reaching the retirement age of 65.

Lambert retired as bishop in late 2019.

== Personal life ==
Lambert is married to Jill and has four children.

Anglican Communion titles
Preceded by Len Eacott	Bishop to the Australian Defence Force; 2013–2019	Succeeded by Grant Dibden
