= Anglican Bishop to the Australian Defence Force =

Bishop to the Australian Defence Force
- Bishopric

anglican
- Coat of arms of the Chaplaincy
- Incumbent: Grant Dibden since 18 March 2020
- Style: The Right Reverend

Location
- Country: Australia
- Residence: Canberra

Information
- First holder: Frank Hulme-Moir
- Denomination: Anglicanism
- Established: 1965

Website
- Defence Anglicans

The Bishop to the Australian Defence Force is the chair of the Defence Force Board of the Anglican Church of Australia. The Board assists the Church in relation to all matters concerned with its ministrations among men and women of the Australian Defence Force and the families of those men and women.

== List of Bishops to the Australian Defence Force ==
No	From	Until	Incumbent	Notes
Bishop to the Armed Forces
1	1965	1979	Frank Hulme-Moir AO	Translated from Nelson, New Zealand; concurrently Dean of Sydney (1965–1967) and coadjutor bishop of Sydney (1965–1975).
Bishops to the Australian Defence Force
1	1979	1989	Ken Short AO	Previously and concurrently Bishop of Wollongong and concurrently Bishop of Parramatta in the Diocese of Sydney; later Dean of Sydney.
2	1989	1994	Adrian Charles AM	Previously and concurrently Assistant Bishop for the Western Region in the Diocese of Brisbane.
3	1994	2001	Brian King	Concurrently Bishop of the Western Region in the Diocese of Sydney.
4	2001	2007	Tom Frame AM	Later Director, St Mark's National Theological Centre (2006–2014)
5	2007	2012	Len Eacott AM, RFD	Previously Archdeacon and Principal Chaplain to the Australian Army.
6	2013	2019	Ian Lambert	Previously Assistant Bishop in the Diocese of Canberra and Goulburn.
7	2020	present	Grant Dibden	Installed 18 March 2020.

== See also ==
- Bishop to the Forces
