= Steve Maina =

Kenyan-born New Zealand Anglican bishop

The Right Reverend Steve Maina
- Bishop of Nelson
- Church: Anglican Church in Aotearoa, New Zealand and Polynesia
- Diocese: Nelson
- In office: 2019–present
- Predecessor: Richard Ellena

Orders
- Ordination: December 2003 (diaconate); December 2004 (priesthood)
- Consecration: 31 August 2019 by Philip Richardson

Personal details
- Born: 1970 (age 55–56) Kenya

Stephen Maina Mwangi (born 1970) is a Kenya-born New Zealand Anglican bishop. He has been the bishop of the Anglican Diocese of Nelson since 2019.

== Early life, education and career ==
Maina was born in Kenya in 1970 and is the son and grandson of Anglican priests. He was raised in the church and experienced a personal conversion at age 14. Maina received a BA in sociology and religious studies from Egerton University in Njoro, Kenya, then an MDiv from Nairobi's Evangelical Graduate School of Theology. He was a pastor and church planter at the non-denominational Nairobi Chapel until 2003, when he was ordained in the Anglican Church of Kenya.

After his ordination, Maina was general secretary of Church Army Africa. In this capacity, he spoke to the New Zealand Church Missionary Society in 2006 and became aware of the challenges of work in a secular environment compared to the more religious culture of Kenya. He became more closely connected with New Zealand and in 2009 joined the NZCMS as national director and immigrated to New Zealand with his wife Watiri, an Anglican deacon, and their two young daughters. Since immigrating, the Mainas have become New Zealand citizens.

== Episcopacy ==
In March 2019, Maina was elected the 11th bishop of Nelson, a historically evangelical diocese on the South Island. He was consecrated and installed on 31 August 2019 at Christ Church Cathedral. At the time of his election, he said that his "heart has always been to see the church in New Zealand passionate about mission, so, this is really an extension of what I've been doing in CMS. . . . My reasons for considering the Nelson role were seeing, first of all, the challenges that Western Christianity is facing in the 21st century: challenges from secularism, individualism, materialism and consumerism; we have a society which is 'pushing God out.'"

== Views ==
Maina describes himself as an evangelical and emphasizes his personal conversion and "discover[y of] God's grace in Jesus." He also emphasizes the importance of biblical literacy and individual devotional practice.

He has also called on the church to serve as "God's agent for social transformation" in an environment where "[i]n New Zealand, we look to government and community organisations to fix challenges around mental health and well-being. . . . It feels like we as church have checked out from our responsibility to bring social transformation."

At the time of his election, shortly after the General Synod of the Anglican Church in Aotearoa, New Zealand and Polynesia had voted to allow blessings of same-sex unions, Maina had not stated his position. He told media: "I don't think it's right to make any comment on that just yet. I'm definitely conservative—I believe in the authority of the Bible and the power of the gospel to change lives—that does not mean that I don't appreciate the need to value and understand where other people are coming from." The synod of Diocese of Nelson's stated policy since 2004 has been that its ministers are prohibited from participating in or leading any service marriage (or a rite similar to it) for a same-sex couple. The diocese "maintains the view that Scripture endorses marriage between a man and a woman as the only acceptable domain for sexual relationships, and therefore does not endorse sexual relationships between people of the same gender."

In September 2020, Maina joined a coalition of other Christian leaders calling on voters to vote no in the ultimately successful 2020 New Zealand euthanasia referendum.

Anglican Communion titles
Preceded by Richard Ellena	Bishop of Nelson; Since 2019	Incumbent
