= Percival Stephenson =

British Anglican bishop (1???-1962)

The Rt Rev Percival William Stephenson was the 6th Anglican bishop of Nelson whose episcopate spanned a 14-year period in the mid-20th century.

== Family ==
The son of Arthur Henry Stephenson (1867-1955), and Annie Amelia Vevers Stephenson (1865-1903), née Brailey, Percival William Stephenson was born at Malmsbury, Victoria on 5 May 1888.

He married Grace Ermyntrude Lavender (1885-1974) on 9 October 1913. They three children, Millicent Lavender Stephenson (1914-), Arthur Lavender Stephenson (1917-2001), and Noel Lavender Stephenson (1920-). Percival Stephenson died in 1962.

== Education ==
He was educated at Caulfield Grammar School, Melbourne, where he was an outstanding footballer in the school's First XVIII, the University of Melbourne, the Australian College of Theology, and the University of London.

- 1912: Bachelor of Arts (B.A.) — University of Melbourne.
- 1913: Licentiate of Theology (L.Th.) — Australian College of Theology.
- 1915: Bachelor of Arts (M.A.) — University of Melbourne.
- 1917: Bachelor of Divinity (B.D.) — University of London.

== Cleric ==
He was ordained in 1914.

== Academic ==
He moved to India to teach at CMS Edwards College in Peshawar, where he was initially a teacher and then principal (1921–1924). From 1924 to 1928 he was professor of exegetical theology at St John's College, Winnipeg.

On his return to Australia he became federal secretary of the Church Missionary Society of Australia and Tasmania and headmaster of Trinity Grammar School, Sydney (1935–37) and then commonwealth secretary of the British and Foreign Bible Society until his elevation to the episcopate in 1940.

== Death ==
He died on 29 May 1962.

== See also ==
- List of Caulfield Grammar School people

== Notes ==
Anglican Communion titles
Preceded by William George Hilliard	Bishop of Nelson; 1940–1954	Succeeded by Francis Oag Hulme-Moir
