= Adrian Charles =

Australian Anglican bishop

The Right Reverend Adrian Owen Charles AM
- Assistant bishop, Brisbane (Western Region); Bishop to the Australian Defence Force
- Church: Anglican Church of Australia
- Diocese: Brisbane
- In office: 1983–1992 (Assistant Bishop, Brisbane); 1989–1994 (Bishop to the Defence Force)
- Other post: Dean of Townsville (1972–1977)

Orders
- Ordination: 1950 (as deacon); 1952 (as priest)
- Consecration: 1 March 1983 by John Grindrod

Personal details
- Born: 31 July 1926 Warwick, Queensland
- Died: 10 April 2013 (aged 86) Sinnamon Park, Queensland

Adrian Owen Charles AM (31 July 1926 – 10 April 2013) was an Australian Anglican bishop, who served as Assistant bishop for the Western Region in the Anglican Diocese of Brisbane from 1983 to 1992, and as Bishop to the Australian Defence Force from 1989 to 1994.

Charles was born in Warwick, Queensland on 31 July 1926. He attended St Catherine's School and Slade School in Warwick, and later studied at St Francis' Theological College and the University of Queensland. He was ordained deacon in 1950 and priest in 1952.

In his parish ministry, Charles served in a variety of roles, including as chaplain to the Southport School, as Vicar at Wondai, St Lucia, Chelmer and Ipswich, and as Senior Anglican Chaplain to the Northern Command from 1963 to 1966. Charles was appointed Archdeacon of Moreton from 1968 to 1970, became Dean of St James' Cathedral, Townsville in the Diocese of North Queensland from 1972 to 1977, and returned to a military role from 1978 to 1983 as Senior Anglican Chaplain to the 1st Military District.

Charles was consecrated as bishop, and appointed Assistant Bishop for the Western Region, on 1 March 1983 by Archbishop of Brisbane Sir John Grindrod. He later served as the third Anglican Bishop to the Australian Defence Force, replacing Ken Short, from 1989 to 1994.

Charles was appointed as a Member of the Order of Australia in the 1994 Queen's Birthday Honours for "service to the community through the Anglican Church of Australia".

Charles was married to Leonie and was survived by children and grandchildren.

Charles died on 10 April 2013 in Sinnamon Park, Queensland.

Anglican Communion titles
Preceded by Ken Short	Bishop to the Australian Defence Force; 1989–1994	Succeeded by Brian King
