= Richard Ellena =

The Right Reverend Richard Ellena
- Bishop of Nelson
- Church: Anglican Church in Aotearoa, New Zealand and Polynesia
- Diocese: Nelson
- Predecessor: Derek Eaton
- Successor: Steve Maina

Orders
- Ordination: 1985
- Consecration: 2007

Personal details
- Born: 1951 (age 74–75)

Victor Richard Ellena (born 15 January 1951 in Christchurch) is a New Zealand Anglican bishop. He was the Bishop of the Anglican Diocese of Nelson between 3 February 2007 and his retirement at the end of 2018.

He was educated at the University of Canterbury after which he worked as a teacher until studying for the Priesthood. He was ordained an Anglican priest in 1985 and has held incumbencies at Kensington-Otipua, Blenheim and Marlborough, where he was also the area's Archdeacon.

He was consecrated bishop of the Diocese of Nelson at 3 February 2007. An Evangelical Anglican, he is a supporter of the Anglican realignment, having attended the Global South Fourth Encounter, in Singapore, at 19–23 April 2010, and the GAFCON II, in Nairobi, Kenya, at 21–26 October 2013.

Anglican Communion titles
Preceded by Derek Eaton	Bishop of Nelson; 2007–2018	Succeeded by Steve Maina
