= Melbourne University Regiment =

Australian Army officer training unit

- Cap badge of the Melbourne University Regiment
- Active: 1884–present
- Country: Australia
- Branch: Army Reserve
- Type: Training establishment
- Role: Army Reserve officer training
- Part of: Forces Command
- Garrison/HQ: Melbourne
- Motto: Postera crescam laude
- March: "The Thin Red Line" (Quick)

Insignia
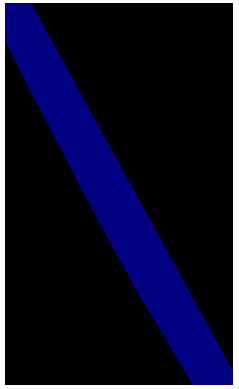
- Unit colour patch

The Melbourne University Regiment (MUR) is an officer training unit in the Australian Army Reserve (ARes). It has a depot at Grattan Street, Carlton, Melbourne, Australia.

== History ==
MUR traces its origins to 1884 as D Company, 4th Battalion of the Victorian Rifles, also known as Mount Alexander Rifles, founded in Bendigo on 30 June 1858, at which time it was known as the University Company. General Sir John Monash was a Colour Sergeant of this unit before taking a commission in the colonial and later Commonwealth militia.

The unit became the Melbourne University Rifles in 1910, providing military training for members of Melbourne University and the public schools of Melbourne and Geelong.

As a University Regiment the unit did not deploy with the AIF in either of the world wars and as such, it carries no Battle Honours on its Colours. However, many officers and soldiers of AIF units had received their initial military training or commissions with the University Rifles. In 1927, the regiment adopted the motto of Postera crescam laude (I will grow by the praise of posterity), the same motto as the University itself.

During the Second World War the regiment was disbanded; this occurred in 1942. In the post-war structure of the Australian Army the University Rifles was reformed as the present Melbourne University Regiment, officially raised on 1 April 1948. In 1953, the regimental march – The Thin Red Line – was approved.

Post Plan Beersheba, Monash University Regiment (MonUR) was disbanded and adsorbed into MUR in 2013.

Currently, MUR is a unit of 8th Brigade (8 Bde) where its headquarters is located in Sydney. MUR is a direct command unit of 8 Bde and as part of the 2nd Division, responsible for training of ARes officer cadets (OCDTs) and other ranks (ORs). MUR consist of three sub-units, these are Monash Company, Herring Company and Rhoden Company. MUR conducts training at three separate facilities: OCDT training at the former Monash University Regiment (MonUR) depot in Mt Waverley, Regimental headquarters and training company located in the Grattan Street, Carlton depot and newly established RIC at Simpson Barracks at Watsonia. It is one of the busiest Reserve units in Victoria where it conducts training courses throughout the year.

== Prominent former members of MUR ==
- General Sir John Monash
- Sir Robert Menzies, the former Australian Prime Minister and founder of the Liberal Party
- Sir Ninian Stephen, the former judge of the High Court and Governor-General of Australia
- Sir Henry Winneke, the former Chief Justice of the Supreme Court of Victoria and Governor of Victoria
- Sir Rupert Hamer, the former Premier of Victoria.
- Barry Humphries, the comedian
- Rev. Alexander Rowan Macneil, the Presbyterian chaplain and Group Scoutmaster interred at Changi Prison during WW2.
