= Tom Frame (bishop) =

Australian academic, author and priest

The Reverend Tom Frame AM
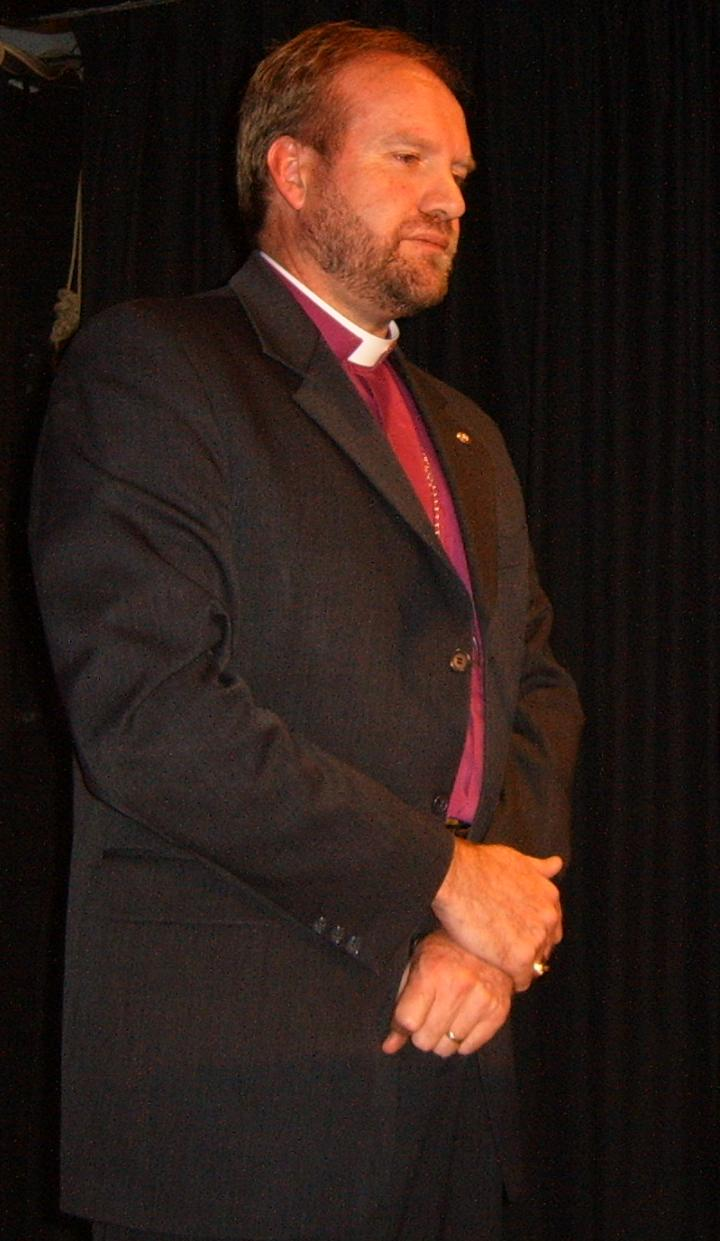
- Frame in 2006
- Born: 7 October 1962 (age 64); Stanmore, New South Wales
- Awards: Member of the Order of Australia (2019)

Academic background
- Education: University of New South Wales (BA [Hons], PhD); University of Melbourne (DipEd); Sydney College of Divinity (MTh); University of Kent (MA [Hons])
- Thesis: Where Fate Calls: The HMAS Voyager Tragedy (1991)
- Doctoral advisor: Roger Thompson

Academic work
- Institutions: University of New South Wales (2014–); Charles Sturt University (2006–14)
- Main interests: Australian military history Maritime and naval history

Thomas Robert Frame AM (born 7 October 1962) is an Australian academic, author and Anglican priest. He was formerly the Anglican Bishop to the Australian Defence Force from 2001 to 2007.

== Early life ==
Frame was born in Stanmore, New South Wales, and raised in Wollongong by his adoptive parents. He was educated at West Wollongong Infants School (1968–70), West Wollongong Primary School (1971–74, awarded dux in 1974) and Wollongong High School (1975–78).

== Career ==
=== Naval career ===
Frame joined the Royal Australian Naval College, HMAS Creswell as a 16-year-old junior entry cadet midshipman in January 1979. Later that year, he was assigned to the destroyer escort HMAS Derwent as a junior officer under training, where he earned his helmsman's certificate. He graduated from the RAN College in December 1983. Frame completed his studies in Chinese history and economics at the University of New South Wales, graduating with Bachelor of Arts (Honours), and the inaugural W.J. Liu Memorial Prize for Excellence in Chinese Studies in 1984.

Frame was the inaugural Summer Vacation Scholar at the Australian War Memorial in 1985, then completed his training aboard HMAS Jervis Bay and HMAS Supply. He was then assigned to the shore establishment HMAS Cerberus as an instructor. While there, he took on additional duty as director of the base's museum, also working as a consultant for the Australian National Maritime Museum and studying for a Diploma in Education from the University of Melbourne.

Frame was appointed research officer to the Chief of Naval Staff at Navy Office, Canberra in April 1988. Two years later he undertook study in military history at the Australian Defence Force Academy leading to the award of a PhD in October 1991, taking as his thesis topic the Melbourne-Voyager collision. He served as a staff officer at Headquarters, Australian Defence Force, before completing full-time naval service in November 1992 and resigning his commission in 1997.

=== Clerical career ===
Frame completed a Master of Theology degree with a thesis entitled "The Delphic Sword: Reconciling Christianity and Military Service in Australia" in June 1993. He trained for the priesthood in the Anglican Church of Australia in the Diocese of Canberra and Goulburn.

He was ordained in December 1993 and appointed curate of St John's Church in Wagga Wagga and a visiting scholar at Charles Sturt University. In November 1995, he was inducted as rector of St James' Church, Binda.

From 1996 to 1997, he took leave in England and completed a Master of Arts (Honours) in applied theology at the University of Kent in Canterbury as the Lucas Tooth Scholar and ministered in the United Benefice of Hever, Four Elms and Markbeech in the Diocese of Rochester.

He became rector of St Philip's Church, Bungendore, in January 1999 and was appointed lecturer (half-time) in public theology at St Mark's National Theological Centre in June 2000. He was also a visiting fellow in the School of Astronomy and Astrophysics at the Australian National University from 1999 to 2003.

On 28 June 2001, he was consecrated a bishop and became the first full-time Anglican bishop to the Australian Defence Force. He was the youngest Anglican bishop in Australia when consecrated and the fifth youngest in the nation's history. He was patron of the Armed Forces Federation of Australia (2002–06) and a member of the council of the Australian War Memorial (2004–07). He was judged the Inaugural Prime Minister's Prize for Australian History in 2007. Although approached to participate in several diocesan episcopal election processes, he never accepted candidacy.

=== Academic career ===
Frame resigned as Anglican Bishop to the Australian Defence Force in November 2006 to become Director of St Mark's National Theological Centre at Barton in Canberra, the administrative headquarters of the School of Theology of Charles Sturt University with the title of Professor. He was head of the CSU School of Theology from November 2006 to June 2008. He completed his directorship of St Mark's in January 2014.

In July 2014, Frame was appointed Director of the Australian Centre for the Study of Armed Conflict and Society (ACSACS) at the University of New South Wales, Canberra, and commissioned to produce a 50th anniversary history of the relationship between the University and the Department of Defence. In July 2017, he was appointed the inaugural director of the Howard Library (located at Old Parliament House, Canberra) and the Public Leadership Research Group. He relinquished directorship of the Howard Library in June 2020. In July 2020, he was commissioned by the Chief of the Defence Force to produce a major study of allegations of misconduct by Australian Special Forces personnel in Afghanistan, 2005-2013. 'Veiled Valour' was published by UNSW Press in June 2022.

Frame retired from UNSW Canberra in June 2023.

== Personal life ==
In 2010, Frame relocated to a rural property adjacent to the village of Tarago (north-east of Canberra) where he is engaged in small-scale beef production. Since 2012 he had been the honorary priest-in-charge of the Mulwaree Anglican Mission District consisting of churches at Lake Bathurst, Tarago and Currawang. In 2018 he chose to relinquish episcopal orders voluntarily after concluding that the episcopate was not a permanent order of ministry.

Frame was awarded the Centenary Medal in 2001 for services to the Australian Defence Force and appointed a Member of the Order of Australia in the 2019 Queen's Birthday Honours for his services to higher education, the Anglican Church, and to the community.

== Publications ==
Frame is the author, co-author or editor of more than 50 books, including:

- The Garden Island (1990)
- He was convenor of the first Australian Naval History Seminar and co-edited its proceedings Reflections on the RAN (1991)
- Where Fate Calls: The HMAS Voyager Tragedy (1992) [on which the 1992 Australian Broadcasting Corporation's Four Corners television documentary "The Cruel Legacy" was based]
- Pacific Partners: A History of Australian-American Naval Relations (1992)
- HMAS Sydney: Loss and Controversy (1993) (on which the 1993 Channel 9 television documentary No Survivors was based]
- Binding Ties: an experience of adoption and reunion in Australia (1999), [autobiographical]
- "The Shores of Gallipoli: Naval Aspects of the Anzac Campaign" (2000)
- "A Church for a Nation: The History of the Anglican Diocese of Canberra & Goulburn" (2000) [Second Prize, 2002 Australian Christian Book of the Year awards]
- "Mutiny! Naval Insurrections in Australia and New Zealand" (2001)
- "Anglicanism in Australia: A History" (2002) [co-edited]
- "No Pleasure Cruise: The Story of the Royal Australian Navy" (2004)
- "Living by the Sword? The Ethics of Armed Intervention" (2004) [Second Prize, 2005 Australian Christian Book of the Year awards]
- "The Life and Death of Harold Holt" (2005)
- "The Cruel Legacy: The HMAS Voyager Tragedy" (2005)
- "Church and State: Australia's Imaginary Wall" (2006)
- "Agendas for Australian Anglicanism: Essays in Honour of Bruce Kaye" (2006) [co-edited]
- "Anglicans in Australia" (2007)
- "Children on Demand: The Ethics of Defying Nature" (2008)
- "HMAS Sydney: Australia's Greatest Naval Tragedy" (2008)
- "Evolution in the Antipodes: Charles Darwin and Australia" (2009)
- "Losing My Religion: Unbelief in Australia" (2009) [Winner, 2010 Australian Christian Literature Society's Australian Christian Book of the Year awards]
- "Called to Minister: Vocational Discernment in the Contemporary Church" (2010) [edited]
- "The RAN in the Mediterranean and North Atlantic" (2014)
- "Moral Injury: Unseen Wounds in an Age of Barbarism" (2015) [edited]
- "Anzac Day: Then and Now" (2016) [edited]
- "On Ops: Lessons and Challenges for the Australian Army since East Timor (2016) [co-edited]
- "Ethics Under Fire: Challenges for the Australian Army (2017) [co-edited]
- "The Long Road: Australia's Train, Advise and Assist Missions" (2017) [edited]
- "The Ascent to Power: the Howard Government, Vol. I, 1996" (2017) [edited]
- "Widening Minds: UNSW and the Education of Australia's Defence Leaders" (2018)
- "Harold Holt and the Liberal Imagination" (2018)
- "Back from the Brink: the Howard Government, Vol. II, 1997-2001" (2018) [edited]
- "Who defines the public interest?" (2018) [edited]
- "Gun Control: What Australia got right (and wrong)" (2019)
- "Trials and Transformations: the Howard Government, Vol. III, 2001-2004" (2019) [edited]
- "Getting Practical about the Public Interest" (2019) [edited]
- "Philip Ruddock and the Politics of Compassion" (2020)
- "An Australian Nuclear Industry: Starting with Submarines?" (2020) [edited]
- "Moral Challenges: Vocational Wellbeing Among First Responders" (2020) [edited]
- "The Desire for Change: the Howard Government, Vol. IV, 2004-2007" (2020) [edited]
- "Veiled Valour: Australian Special Forces in Afghanistan and War Crimes Allegations" (2022)
- "A Very Proper Man: the Life of Tony Eggleton" (2022)

He co-wrote:

- "First In, Last Out! The Navy at Gallipoli" (1990)
- "Where the Rivers Run: A History of the Anglican Parish of Wagga Wagga" (1995)
- "Labouring in Vain: A History of Bishopthorpe" (1996)
- "The Seven Churches of Binda: the history of an Anglican rural parish" (1998)
- "Stromlo: An Australian Observatory" (2003)
- "Defining Convictions and Decisive Commitments: The 39 Articles in Contemporary Anglicanism" (2010)

Anglican Communion titles
Preceded by Brian King	Bishop to the Australian Defence Force; 2001–2007	Succeeded by Len Eacott
