= Brian King (bishop) =

Brian Franklin Vernon King (3 January 1938 – 22 November 2006) was an assistant bishop in the Anglican Diocese of Sydney, and concurrently Bishop to the Australian Defence Force.

King was educated at Sydney Boys' High School and the University of New South Wales.

King was a passionate Rugby player, playing 112 first-grade games and was a member of two premiership-winning teams. He was selected for the Waratahs, scoring two tries, and played against New Zealand, Fiji and Queensland.

He worked as a chartered accountant for eight years before pursuing theological studies.

After studying at Moore Theological College he was ordained in 1965. He was a curate at Manly and then rector of Dural. After further incumbencies at Wahroonga and Manly he was appointed Bishop of the Western Region (Sydney diocese) in 1993. He was also concurrently Bishop to the Australian Defence Force. He retired in 2002 and was married to Pamela King.

Anglican Communion titles
Preceded by Adrian Charles	Bishop to the Australian Defence Force; 1994–2001	Succeeded by Tom Frame
