= Derek Eaton =

New Zealand Anglican bishop

Derek Lionel Eaton QSM (born 10 September 1941) is a retired New Zealand Anglican bishop. He was the 9th Anglican Bishop of Nelson, from 1990 to 2006.

== Biography ==
He was educated at Christchurch Boys' High School and Auckland College of Education after which he worked as a teacher until studying for the Priesthood. He was ordained in 1971 and after a curacy at St Luke's, Bristol he was Vicar of Tunis. Later he was Provost of All Saint's Cathedral, Cairo and held incumbencies at Bishopdale and (his last appointment before ordination to the episcopate) Redcliffs. He is married to Alice Eaton. He was consecrated a bishop on 24 June 1990.

After 16 years as Bishop of Nelson, Eaton returned to Africa to become assistant bishop of the Anglican Diocese of Egypt. Since returning to New Zealand from Africa in January 2009, Eaton and his wife have been chaplains to Bishopdale Theological College.

In the 1985 New Year Honours, Eaton was awarded the Queen's Service Medal for community service.

Anglican Communion titles
Preceded by Peter Eves Sutton	Bishop of Nelson; 1990–2006	Succeeded by Richard Ellena
