= Harold Ault =

Anglican priest in New Zealand

Harold Frank Ault (/ɔːlt/ AWLT; 28 October 1902 – 19 September 1983) was an Anglican priest in New Zealand .

Ault was born at New Brighton, educated at Christ's College, Christchurch, then College House and Canterbury College, Christchurch, University of New Zealand; made deacon on 21 December 1924, and ordained priest on 21 December 1926, both times at Christchurch. After curacies in Rangiora and St Albans he was with the CMS in Karachi from 1928 to 1931. He was Vicar of Oxford from 1934 to 1938 and Secretary of the New Zealand Anglican Board of Mission from 1938 to 1944. He then held incumbencies at Southbridge—Leeston, Akaroa and Nelson. While incumbent of All Saints Church, Nelson, he was also Archdeacon of Waimea from June 1956 until 10 March 1966, when he departed Nelson to return to the Canterbury Plains: he was Vicar of Hinds. In 1968, he returned to Christchurch, where he served the suburbs of Merivale and Sumner—Heathcote before retiring to central Christchurch the same year; he later died there.
