= William Sadlier (bishop) =

William Charles Sadlier (29 May 1867 – 1 February 1935) was the 4th Anglican bishop of Nelson whose Episcopate spanned a 22-year period in the first half of the 20th century.

He was educated at Trinity College, Melbourne and ordained in 1892. After a curacy at St Paul's, Bendigo he was Vicar of Holy Trinity, Melbourne. From 1904 to 1912 he was Vicar of Christ Church, St Kilda when he was elevated to the episcopate.

== Notes ==
Anglican Communion titles
Preceded by Charles Oliver Mules	Bishop of Nelson; 1912–1934	Succeeded by William George Hilliard
