= Ken Short =

The Right Reverend Ken Short AO
- Bishop to the Australian Defence Force
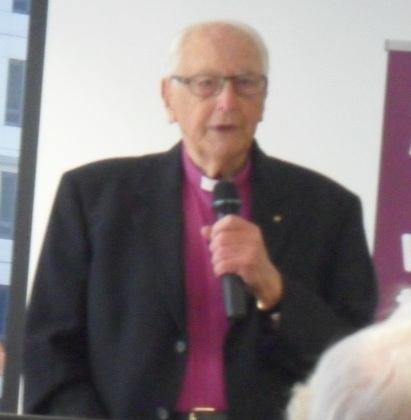
- Short in 2010
- Church: Anglican Church of Australia
- Diocese: Sydney
- In office: 1979–1989
- Predecessor: Frank Hulme-Moir
- Successor: Adrian Charles
- Other posts: Bishop of Wollongong (1975–1982); Bishop of Parramatta (1982–1989); Dean of Sydney (1989–1992)

Orders
- Ordination: 1952 (as priest)
- Consecration: 1 April 1975 by Marcus Loane

Personal details
- Born: 6 July 1927 Nairobi, Kenya
- Died: 19 October 2014 (aged 87) Wollongong, New South Wales, Australia
- Denomination: Anglican
- Spouse: Gloria
- Children: 3, including David
- Education: Moore Theological College

Kenneth Herbert Short AO (6 July 1927 – 19 October 2014) was an Anglican bishop in Australia. He was the Bishop of Wollongong and then Bishop of Parramatta and Bishop to the Australian Defence Force. He was appointed dean of St Andrew's Cathedral, Sydney in 1989. He was a missionary, pastor and military chaplain.

== Early life ==
Kenneth Herbert Short was born to Cecil Short and Joyce Ellen (daughter of Herbert Begbie, sometime Archdeacon of West Sydney) on 6 July 1927 in Nairobi, Kenya. His family returned to Australia and settled in Tasmania, where Cecil was rector of St George's Battery Point from 1931. In January 1934, Cecil was appointed rector of St Andrew's Church, Wahroonga, and the family moved to Sydney.

Short went to school at Trinity Grammar School, Summer Hill, and Barker College. At 19, he joined the Australian Army with an officer's commission and served with the British Commonwealth Occupation Force in Japan from 1946 to 1948. He was made lieutenant in 1946. He studied for the Anglican ministry at Moore Theological College, Sydney. He married Gloria Noelle Funnell (daughter of Ernest Henry Funnell and Violet Isobel Baldock) on 28 January 1950.

== Ministry ==
Short was ordained in 1952, and served the Parish of Pittwater before going with the Church Missionary Society to Tanzania. He and his family remained there until 1964, founding the Msalato Bible School in Dodoma, where he was principal from 1961.

Returning to Australia, Short was appointed general secretary to the Church Missionary Society in New South Wales. He stepped down in 1971 and served as rector of St Michael's Vaucluse for four years.

Short was consecrated a bishop on 1 April 1975, and served as area Bishop of Wollongong from 1975 to 1982, the Archdeacon of Wollongong from 1975 to 1979, and of Camden from 1975 to 1976. He was also an examining chaplain to the Archbishop of Sydney from 1971 to 1982. He was then Bishop of Parramatta from 1982 to 1989 and concurrently Bishop to the Australian Defence Force from 1979 to 1989. During that time, he was Army Chaplain General (1979–1981) holding the rank of major general. In 1989, Short was made Dean of St Andrew's Cathedral, Sydney.

In 1988, the year of Australia's bicentenary, Short was appointed an Officer of the Order of Australia for services to "Religion, particularly as Anglican Bishop of the Australian Defence Force." In 1989 he was made a chaplain of the Order of St John.

== Retirement ==
After retiring in 1992, Short filled various roles, at St. John's Shaughnessy in Vancouver, as Bishop of Wollongong, and in parish ministry in Hobart, Geraldton, Berry and Kangaroo Valley. He also was acting state secretary of the Church Missionary Society in Victoria and then New South Wales. He also pursued his interests in carpentry, fishing, photography and bird watching.

== Death ==
Short died on 19 October 2014 in Wollongong. He was survived by his wife Gloria, three children (Kathy, David and Marion), eight grandchildren and one great-grandson.

Anglican Communion titles
Preceded by Graham Delbridge	Bishop of Wollongong; 1975–1982	Succeeded by Harry Goodhew
Preceded by Frank Hulme-Moir as Bishop to the Armed Forces	Bishop to the Australian Defence Force; 1979–1989	Succeeded by Adrian Charles
Preceded by Donald Robinson	Bishop of Parramatta; 1982–1989	Succeeded by Peter Watson
Preceded by Lance Shilton	Dean of Sydney; 1989–1992	Succeeded by Boak Jobbins
