= Andrew Suter =

English-born bishop and art supporter in Nelson, New Zealand

Andrew Burn Suter (1830–1895) was the second Anglican bishop of Nelson whose episcopate spanned a 26-year-period during the second half of the 19th century.

He was born in London, and educated at St Paul's School and Trinity College, Cambridge. He was ordained in 1855. After a curacy at St Dunstan-in-the-West he was Vicar of All Saints, Mile End until 1866, and his appointment to New Zealand. He resigned in 1891 and died on 29 March 1895.

== Early life ==
Suter was born in London to Richard Suter, an architect, and Ruth Burn. Both were evangelical Christians. He was educated at St Paul's School, London, before moving to Trinity College, Cambridge, in 1849. He took his BA in 1853. He was ordained a deacon in 1855, and a priest in 1856. From 1856 to 1859 he was curate at St Dunstan-in-the-West, Fleet Street, London. In 1859 he became vicar of All Saints, Spitalfields. On 7 August 1860, at Barham, Kent, he married Amelia Harrison.

== Career ==
The bishop of London offered Suter the bishopric of Nelson, New Zealand, in 1865. He was consecrated at Canterbury cathedral on 24 August 1866. He had gained his MA from the University of Cambridge in 1857, and in 1867 received his doctorate of divinity. In June 1867 he left for Nelson.

Along with his church duties, Suter was a painter and art collector. In 1889, he established the Bishopdale Sketching Club (now the Nelson Suter Art Society) and was its first President. In 1890, a stroke incapacitated Bishop; during the last years of his life, he mentioned a ‘long cherished wish’ to create an art gallery for Nelson.

Suter died in Nelson on 29 March 1895. Amelia Suter died in Barham, England in 1896. They had no children. A collection of Amelia's paintings formed the basis of the Bishop Suter Art Gallery collection, established in Nelson in 1899.

== Legacy ==
The plant Pimelea suteri was named in his honour by botanist Thomas Kirk.

Anglican Communion titles
Preceded by Edmund Hobhouse	Bishop of Nelson; 1866–1891	Succeeded by Charles Oliver Mules
