= Australian Ex-Prisoners of War Memorial =

War memorial in Ballarat, Victoria, Australia

Coordinates: 37°33′12″S 143°49′17″E

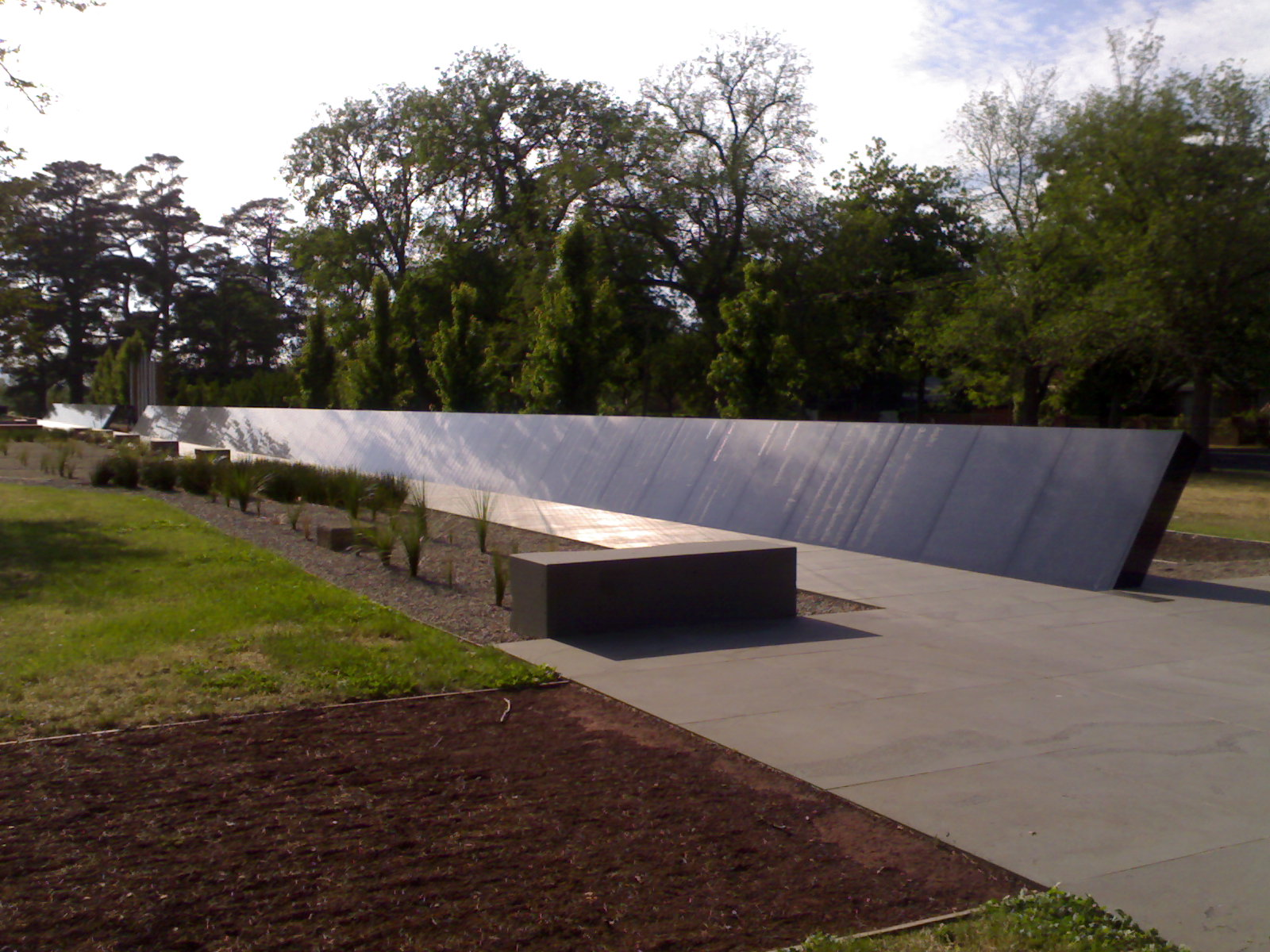
The row of names of all known Australian POWs

The Australian Ex-Prisoners of War Memorial was dedicated on Friday, 6 February 2004. It is located on the southern approaches to the Ballarat Botanical Gardens, on Wendouree Parade and adjacent to Lake Wendouree.

The memorial was designed and built by sculptor Peter Blizzard.

== Purpose ==
Now recognised nationally as the official National Prisoner of War Memorial, the memorial honours more than 35,000 Australians who were held prisoner during the Boer War, World War I, World War II and the Korean War. It is a place of national honour, remembrance and healing for all Australians. The memorial takes visitors on a journey to a different time and place, where heroism, sacrifice and mateship were the defining characteristics of the prisoners of war.

== Background ==
Between the 1950s and 1990s surviving prisoners of war from the Ballarat region met regularly and various plans for the establishment of a focal point for commemoration were periodically discussed. Throughout that time the Australian Government had given periodic undertakings that a permanent monument would be eventually built in Canberra (the national capital). By the early 1980s, the Ballarat City Council granted a parcel of land adjacent to the city gardens to allow local veterans a place to establish a permanent focal point for the Ballarat POWs. By the mid-1990s the Australian Federal Government still had no plan for a permanent monument to be established in Canberra, thus the surviving POWs in Ballarat were prompted into action and began planning the building of a permanent memorial in their city to be largely privately funded and established with minimum government assistance.

With significant support from the Ballarat branch of the Returned and Services League (RSL) of Australia, a local sculptor, Peter Blizzard, was commissioned to design a concept for the memorial. The vision provided by the sculptor was for a monument far greater in scale and scope than that originally envisaged by the veterans. However, support for a significantly larger monument that would commemorate all Australian POWs was immediate. Funding was provided through lotteries, private donations, benevolent organisations (most notably Tattersall's), the City of Ballarat, local businesses, and finally the Federal and Victorian State Governments. Work commenced on the construction of the memorial in early 2003 with much of the labour and materials donated or provided at cost.

The Ballarat RSL, assisted by volunteers, worked for over 10 years to compile names to form the first national database of Australian prisoners of war. Prior to 2004, the Australian Federal Government and the Australian Defence Force held no complete central list, database, or consolidated record of its prisoners of war. Information was recorded only on individual personnel records held in Defence archives at the Central Army Records Office (CARO) in Melbourne. It is believed that there may be some names still missing, and the memorial has a postscript section allocated to enable further additions.

== Design ==
Approximately 130 metres (430 ft) long, the memorial features a long pathway of light-grey basalt pavers cut to resemble railway sleepers, reminiscent of those used on the Thai–Burma Railway. To the southern side are two canted black polished granite walls with the names of all known Australian prisoners of war. They are listed alphabetically by war and no rank is acknowledged. The two walls are separated in the middle by a square pool of water that features six large basalt obelisks. These feature the names of the countries where Australian POWs were held. The obelisks centralised in the pool of water symbolise the Australian POWs being cut off and isolated from their homeland by the ocean. The sixth obelisk is deliberately toppled on its side and broken, symbolising "The Fallen".

To the northern flank of the memorial is a larger basalt obelisk that serves as the focal point and cenotaph of the memorial which is flanked by the flags of the Royal Australian Navy, the Royal Australian Air Force, the Australian Merchant Navy and the Australian National Flag, representing the Australian Army. At the western end of the memorial another stone wall is situated with cascading water and the words "LEST WE FORGET"; this marks the completion of the journey. The memorial is surrounded by plantings of native and jungle grasses as well as conifer and deciduous trees.

== Gallery ==
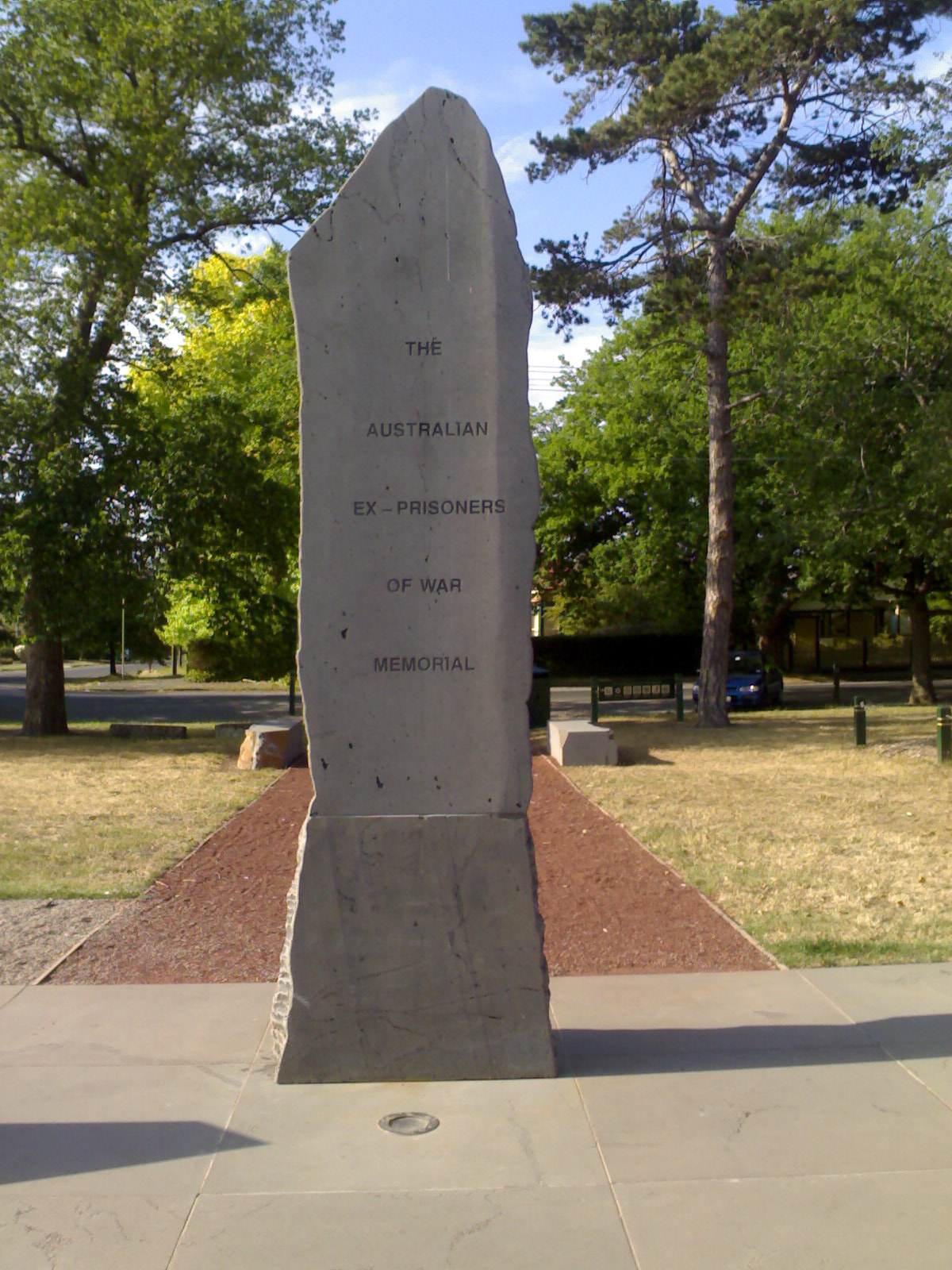
An obelisk at the Western approach to the Memorial

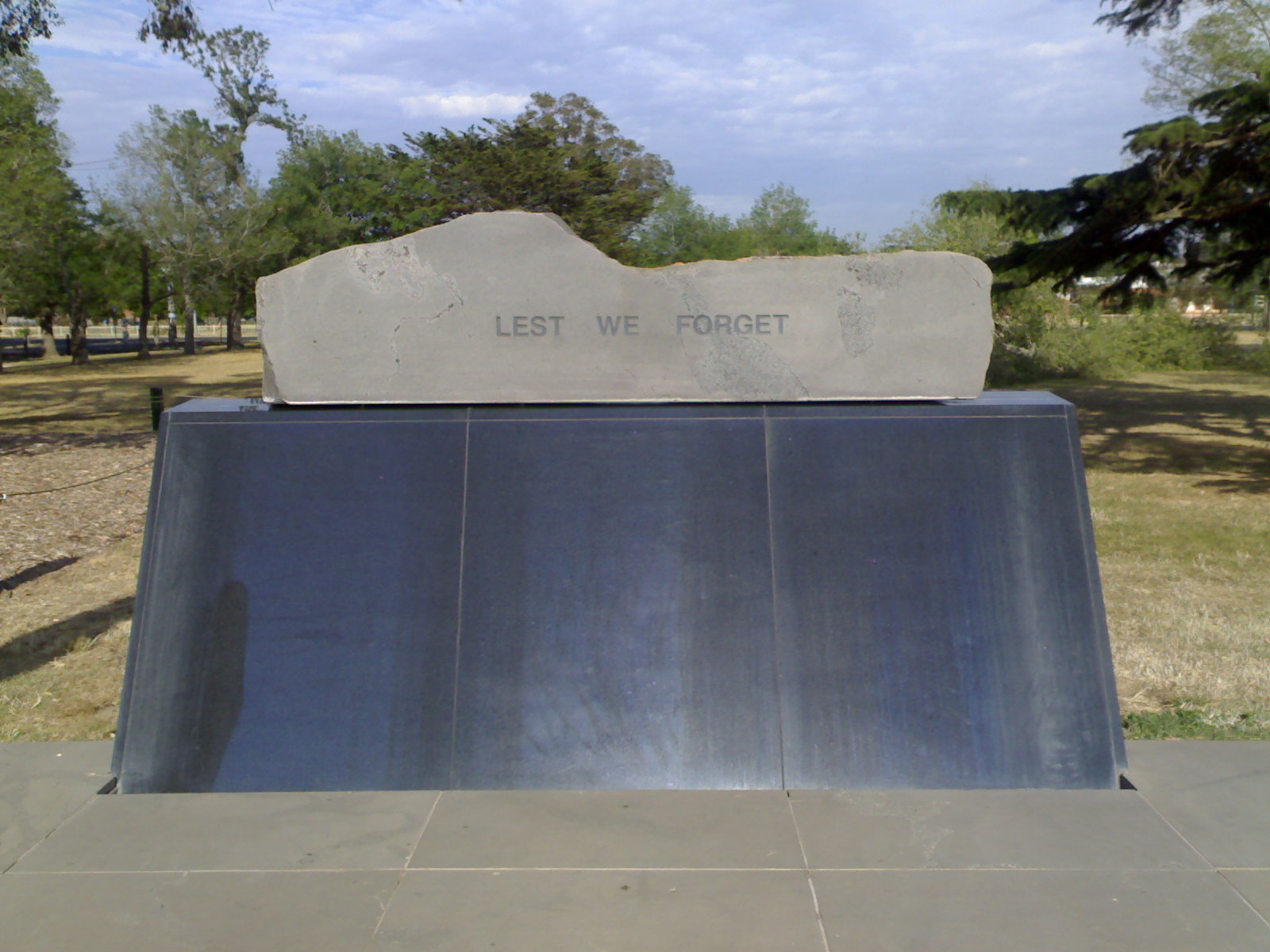
Their names will liveth for ever more... LEST WE FORGET

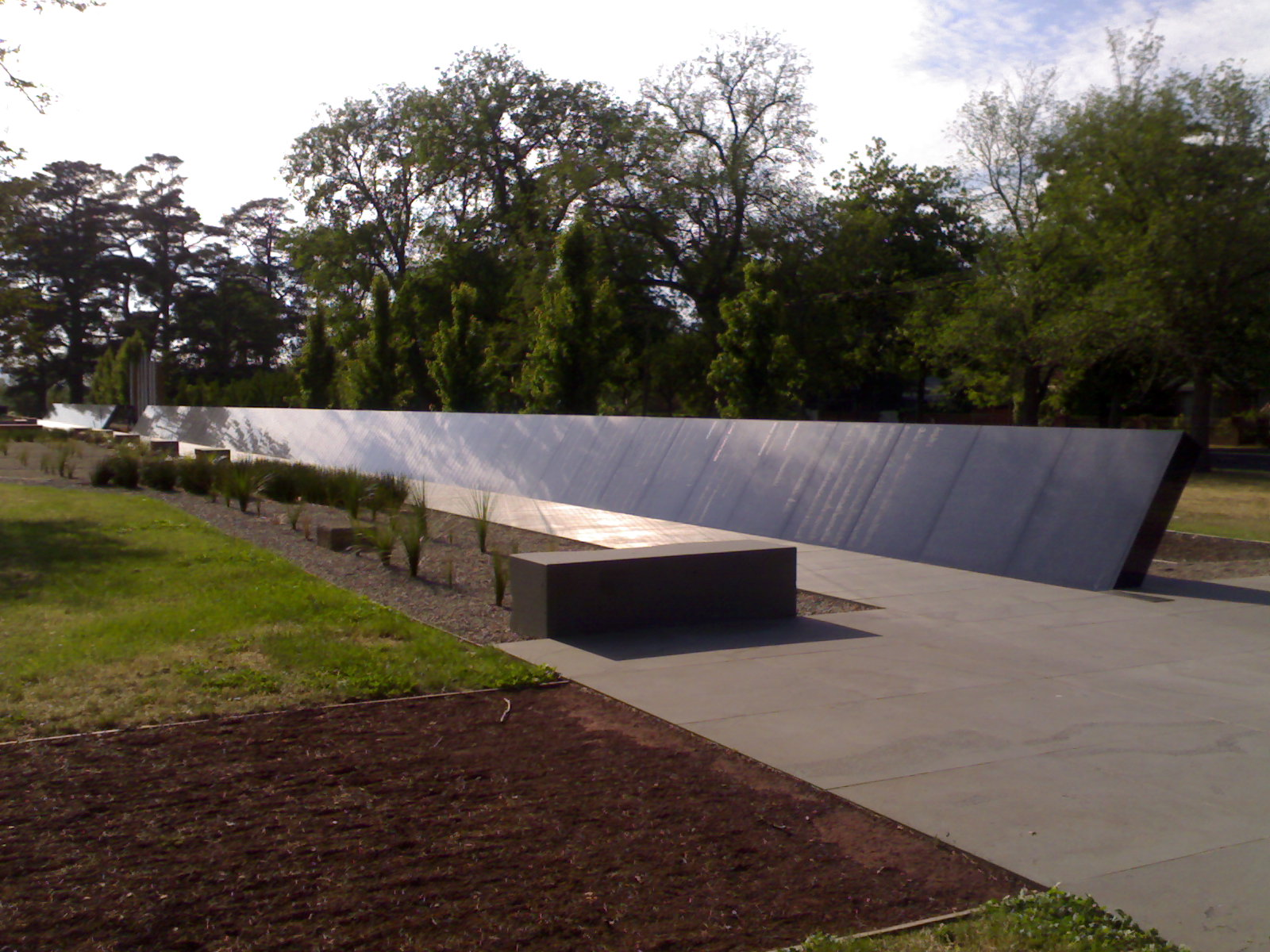
The memorial is over 150 metres (490 ft) long and features the names of all POWs

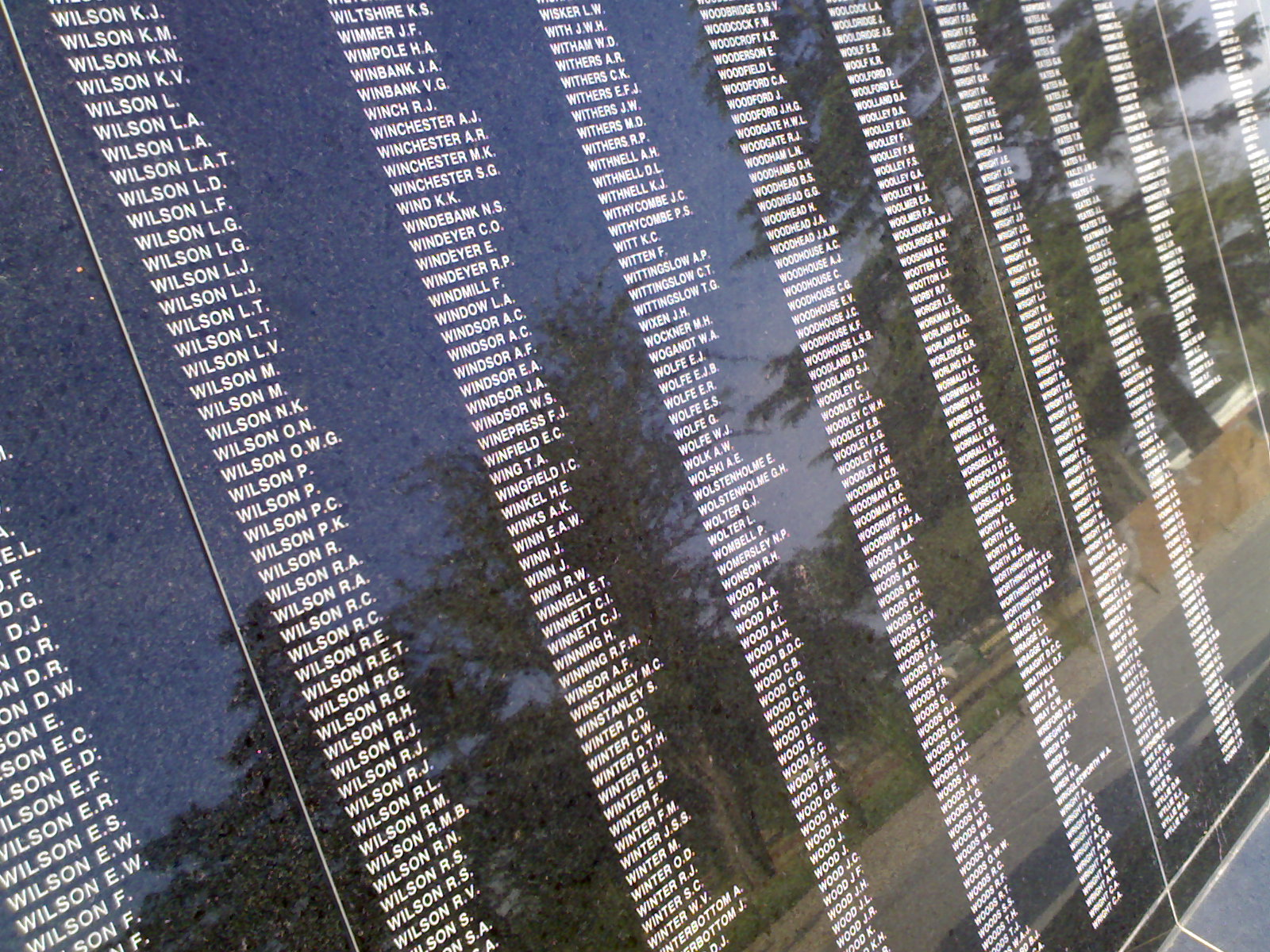
A small section of the list of Australian ex-prisoners of War
