= Len Eacott =

Australian Anglican bishop

The Right Reverend Len Eacott AM
- Bishop to the Australian Defence Force
- Church: Anglican Church of Australia
- In office: 29 June 2007 – 31 December 2012

Orders
- Ordination: 1983
- Consecration: 29 June 2007

Personal details
- Born: 14 June 1947 (age 79) Toowoomba, Queensland
- Denomination: Anglican
- Spouse: Sandy
- Children: Not Public />
- Education: St Francis' Theological College; University of Queensland University of South Australia

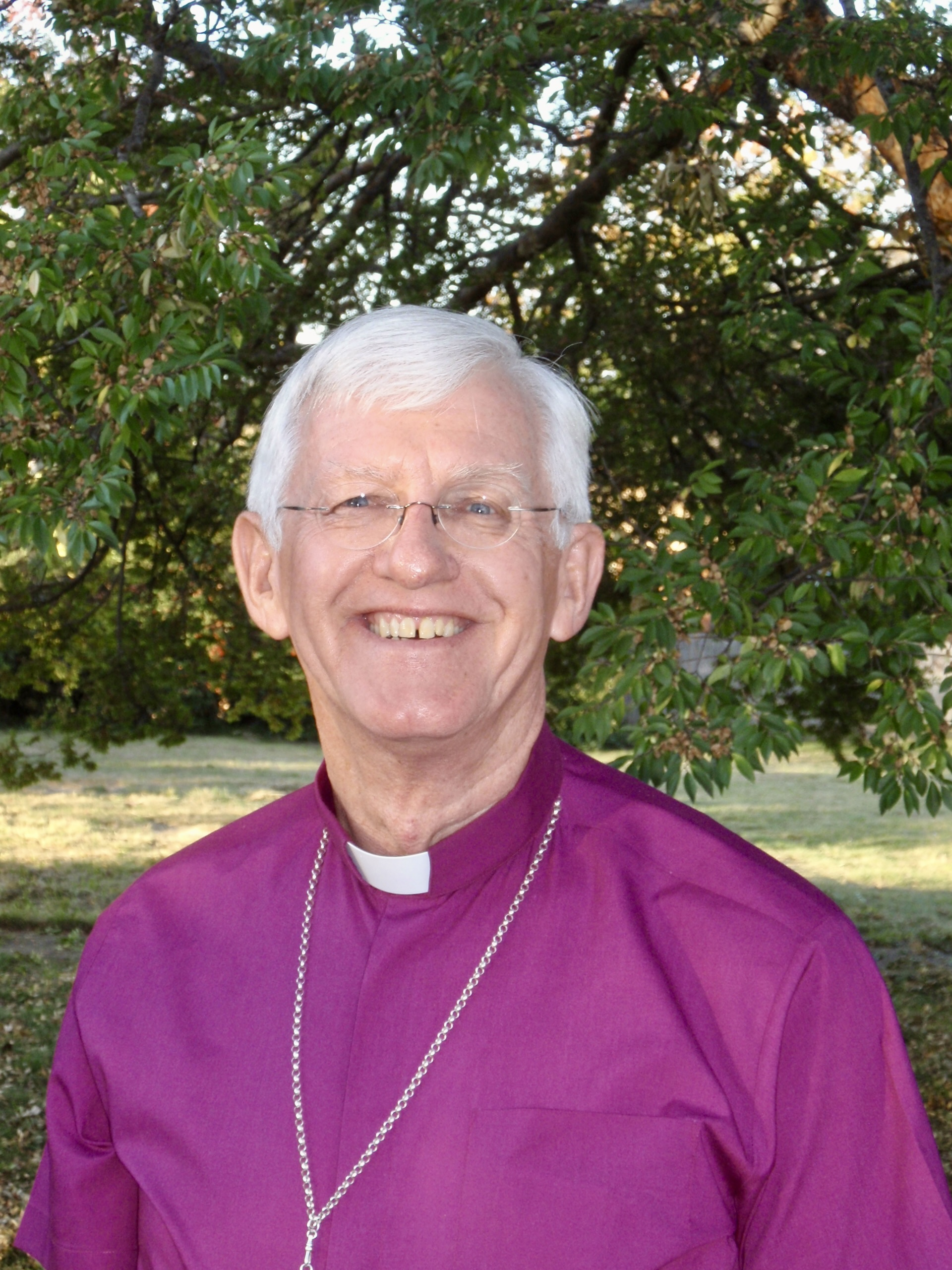

Leonard Sidney Eacott AM (born 14 June 1947) is a retired Australian Anglican bishop, army chaplain and military officer, who served as Anglican Bishop to the Australian Defence Force from 2007 to 2012.

== Early life, parish ministry and military career ==
Eacott was born in Toowoomba and grew up in regional Queensland.

Eacott enlisted in the Royal Australian Infantry Corps of the Citizens Military Forces in November 1966, and from 1968 to 1972 fulfilled a national service commitment. In early 1972, Eacott was commissioned as a General Service Officer (Royal Australian Infantry) in the Army Reserve, serving with 25 Battalion, the Royal Queensland Regiment and the Queensland University Regiment. He was also employed as a soil conservation field officer by the Queensland Department of Primary Industries until commencing training for Anglican ministry in 1980.

Eacott is a graduate of St Francis' Theological College and the University of Queensland and initially served in rural and city parish ministry and part-time army chaplaincy with the Army Reserve in Southern Queensland before transferring to full-time chaplaincy with the Royal Australian Army Chaplains' Department.

As part of his military service as a chaplain, Eacott served as Anglican chaplain to the 3rd Brigade, Townsville, deployed in 1993 with the United Nations Transitional Authority in Cambodia, the Land Warfare Centre, Canungra. From 1996 to 1999 he served as senior chaplain to 1 Division at the Deployable Joint Force Headquarters at Enoggera. In 1999–2000 Eacott served as Senior Chaplain to the International Force East Timor under Major General Peter Cosgrove, during which time he was involved with the exhumation and reburial of bodies suspected as being victims of crimes against humanity and established and maintained a burial register. He also served as Senior Chaplain to the Logistic Support Force and Command Chaplain to Land Headquarters in Sydney. On 1 March 2002, Eacott was collated as archdeacon to the Australian Army and on 18 November 2002 was appointed as principal chaplain to the Australian Army (Director General of Chaplaincy – Army), a position which he held until 21 January 2007. He retired from the Australian Regular Army on 16 June 2007.

== Episcopal ministry ==
In May 2007, Eacott was appointed by the Primate of the Anglican Church and Chief of the Defence Force as Anglican Bishop to the Australian Defence Force, replacing Bishop Tom Frame. He was consecrated as bishop and installed on 29 June 2007.

Eacott retired on 31 December 2012 after reaching the retirement age of 65 years and was succeeded by Bishop Ian Lambert.

== Publications ==
- Eacott, Leonard Sidney (1979). Practical Aspects of Planning and Implementing Strip Cropping Systems on Very Low Gradient Land (Report). Division of Land Utilisation Report 79/4, Queensland Department of Primary Industries.
- Eacott, Leonard Sidney (1992). "World War 1: A Testing Time for Australian Christianity" (PDF). Australian Defence Force Journal. 95 (July/August 1992). Department of Defence: 53–57.
- Eacott, Leonard Sidney (2009). "Chapter 11: Ministry in War and Peace". In Hale, Stephen; Curnow, Andrew (eds.). Facing the future : bishops imagine a different church (1st ed.). Brunswick, Victoria: Acorn Press. ISBN 978-0-908284-90-0.

== Awards and personal life ==
Eacott is married to Sandy (Reference to family removed for privacy reasons).

Eacott was awarded the Reserve Force Decoration in 1987. Eacott was appointed as a Member of the Order of Australia (Military Division) in the 2007 Australia Day Honours for "exceptional service and outstanding devotion to duty as Principal Chaplain – Army and Head of Corps, Royal Australian Army Chaplains' Department".

Anglican Communion titles
Preceded by Tom Frame	Bishop to the Australian Defence Force; 2007–2012	Succeeded by Ian Lambert
