= Royal Australian Army Chaplains' Department =

- Active: 1913 – present
- Country: Australia
- Branch: Army
- Type: Corps
- Role: Military chaplaincy
- Nickname: Padre
- Motto: In this Sign Conquer

Commanders
- Director General Chaplaincy: Pastor Darren Jaensch AM (Protestant — Lutheran)
- Catholic Principal Chaplain: Monsignor Glynn Murphy OAM
- Anglican Principal Chaplain: The Venerable Glenn Buijs (Archdeacon of the Army)

Insignia
- Cap badge: Crowned Maltese cross (Christian chaplains), Crowned Star of David (Jewish chaplains)
- Lanyard: purple, right shoulder

The Royal Australian Army Chaplains' Department (RAAChD) is an all-officer corps of the Australian Army that provides ordained clergy to minister to the personnel of the Australian Army. RAAChD chaplains belong to either one of several Christian churches, or to the Jewish faith. As of 2012, there are 67 serving regular chaplains (commonly known as 'padres') in the full-time Australian Army and 83 chaplains in the Australian Army Reserve.

The department was granted the privilege of the prefix 'Royal' by King George VI along with a number of other Australian Army corps in December 1948 in recognition of their service during the Second World War. Before that, the department was titled the Australian Army Chaplains' Department.

== Uniforms and insignia ==
The Royal Australian Army Chaplains' Department has two cap badges, one for its Christian chaplains that features a Maltese cross, and another for Jewish chaplains that features a Star of David. Whatever unit a chaplain is assigned to they continue to wear a RAAChD cap badge. Chaplains are permitted to wear their assigned unit's beret if one is worn, but with the RAAChD cap badge.

Christian chaplains wear a cross on the shirt collars and lapels of their uniforms; Jewish chaplains wear a Star of David instead. These insignia are of gold-coloured metal on all uniform orders except Australian Multicam Camouflage Uniform (AMCU). On the latter, these insignia are embroidered in black cotton. Principal Chaplains and Chaplains Division 4 wear gorget patches (of a Brigadier or Colonel respectively) in purple (instead of red) in place of the metal insignia on their collars and lapels, but wear the same cloth insignia as worn by other chaplains on AMCU uniforms.

When wearing service dress, the utility jacket or 'polyesters' (shirt-sleeve order), RAAChD chaplains wear a purple lanyard over their right shoulder instead of their assigned unit's lanyard.

Army chaplains, although they are all commissioned officers of the Australian Army and wear uniform, do not carry arms. They are the only officers not to carry swords on parade.

Chaplains are permitted to wear a clerical collar and black stock under the service, utility or mess jackets, and some are given permission to wear one with General Duty AMCU dress. At services on formal occasions, chaplains wear their medals and decorations on their clerical robes.

In November 2015, the media reported a change to the Royal Australian Army Chaplains' Department's badge. This reporting was misleading: a change to the corps' badge is not a matter the Chief of the Army is currently considering.

== Ranks ==
All Australian Army chaplains have the title 'Chaplain' (CHAP) or 'Principal Chaplain' (PRINCHAP) instead of a rank title even though they wear rank insignia. They are addressed as 'Chaplain' or, more frequently, 'Padre' instead of the title of the rank insignia which they wear. Chaplains usually discourage more junior ranks from addressing them as 'Sir'/'Ma'am'.

In addition to these titles, chaplains are graded into five Divisions. Newly commissioned chaplains are in Division 1 (CHAP1); Principal Chaplains are in Division 5. The rank insignia worn by chaplains, indicating an equivalent rank, is based on their Division according to the table below.

RAAChD Divisions and Rank Insignia
Division	Rank Insignia
Chaplain Division 1 (CHAP1)	Captain
Chaplain Division 2 (CHAP2)	Major
Chaplain Division 3 (CHAP3)	Lieutenant Colonel
Chaplain Division 4 (CHAP4)	Colonel
Principal Chaplain (PRINCHAP)	Brigadier

The system of five Divisions is also used across the Australian Defence Force by chaplains of the Royal Australian Navy and the Royal Australian Air Force. While the latter wear RAAF rank insignia in a similar way to Army chaplains, RAN chaplains do not wear rank insignia.

=== Principal chaplains ===
The Royal Australian Army Chaplains' Department has three principal chaplains (PRINCHAP) representing the three major Christian denominations – Catholic, Anglican, and nonconformist Protestant – and the Jewish faith. The principal chaplains of the Army wear the rank of brigadier.

One of the three principal chaplains is employed as the full-time director general of chaplaincy — Army (DGCHAP-A), the head of the department.

The Catholic principal chaplain is an episcopal vicar of the Catholic Diocese of the Australian Military Services and is nominated to be made a Chaplain of His Holiness (with the title of monsignor). The Anglican principal chaplain is appointed to the position of archdeacon of the Army (with the style Venerable).

=== Heads of denominations ===
In the Australian Defence Force (ADF), the heads of military chaplaincy for those Christian denominations and of the Jewish faith that have an official association with the ADF, are also members of the ADF's Religious Advisory Committee to the Services (RACS). With respect to the Catholic and Anglican churches, their bishops (the Bishop of the Catholic Military Ordinariate and the Anglican Bishop to the ADF) are members of RACS and they and the other members of RACS have the rank equivalence of a major general but do not wear uniforms. The current chairman of the RACS is Rev Prof Allan Harman.

== Order of precedence ==
Preceded by Australian Intelligence Corps	Australian Army Order of Precedence	Succeeded by Royal Australian Corps of Transport

== See also ==
- Royal Australian Navy § Religious and Spiritual Officers
- Catholic Diocese of the Australian Military Services
- Anglican Bishop to the Australian Defence Force
