= Anglican Diocese of Nelson =

Anglican diocese in New Zealand

Diocese of Nelson
- Arms of the Diocese of Nelson
- Incumbent: Steve Maina
- Style: The Right Reverend

Location
- Country: New Zealand
- Territory: South Island
- Ecclesiastical province: Aotearoa, New Zealand and Polynesia
- Headquarters: Nelson
- Coordinates: 41°16′16″S 173°17′09″E

Statistics
- Parishes: 25 (date unknown)

Information
- First holder: Edmund Hobhouse
- Formation: 1858
- Denomination: Anglican
- Rite: Evangelical
- Cathedral: Christ Church Cathedral

Current leadership
- Parent church: Anglican Communion
- Major Archbishop: Primate of New Zealand; Pīhopa Mātāmua
- Diocesan bishop: Steve Maina

Website
- www.nelsonanglican.nz

The Diocese of Nelson is one of the 13 dioceses and hui amorangi (Māori bishoprics) of the Anglican Church in Aotearoa, New Zealand and Polynesia. The Diocese covers the northern part of the South Island of New Zealand, which is mostly the area north of a line drawn from Greymouth to Kaikōura.

The Diocese was founded in 1858 and the seat of the Bishop is at Christ Church Cathedral in Nelson.

On 31 August 2019, Steve Maina was ordained and installed as Bishop of Nelson.

Nelson Diocese is a noted Evangelical diocese, drawing similarities with the Anglican Diocese of Sydney, in Australia.

== List of bishops ==
The following individuals have served as the Bishop of Nelson, or any precursor title:

Bishops of Nelson
Ordinal	Officeholder	Term start	Term end	Notes
1	Edmund Hobhouse	1858	1865	
2	Andrew Suter	1866	1891	
3	Charles Mules	1892	1912	
4	William Sadlier	1912	1934	
5	William Hilliard	1934	1940	
6	Percival Stephenson	1940	1954	
7	Frank Hulme-Moir	1954	1965	
8	Peter Sutton	1965	1990	
9	Derek Eaton	1990	2006	
10	Richard Ellena	2007	2018	
11	Steve Maina	31 August 2019	incumbent	

== Archdeaconries ==
In 1866, the sole archdeaconry – of Waimea – was vacant.

Archdeacon of Waimea

- ?–1859 (res.): Ven Robert B. Paul
- 1859–1874: vacant
- 1874–1880 (res.): Ven Thorpe
- 1880–1891: Ven Charles O. Mules-(Later Bishop of Nelson)
- 1898–1908: Ven Aldred C. Wright
- 1909–1915: Ven William Baker
- 1915–1926: Ven John P. Kempthorne
- 1926–?: Ven John Dart
- 1940–1949: Ven Oliver J. Kimberly
- 1949: Ven Thomas E. Champion
- ?-? Ven T J. Smith
- 1956–1966: (res.): Harold Ault

Archdeacon of Wairau

- 1868–1886 (d.): Ven H. F. Butt
- ?: Ven Thomas Grace

Archdeacon of Māwhera

- 1886–?: Ven Thomas Billing Maclean
- 1903–1919: Ven George York V.D.
- 1920–1928: Ven Arthur Carr
- 1940–1955: Ven Thomas Smith
- 1955–1957: Ven Herbert Rowe
- 1957–1963: Ven Douglas Spencer
- 1961–1970: Ven Desmond Jameson
- 1977–1989: Ven Robert Hughes

Archdeacon of Marlborough

- 1868–1886: Ven Henry Butt-1st Archdeacon of Marlborough
- 1890: Ven Thomas Grace-2nd Archdeacon of Marlborough
- 1919–1929: Ven George York V.D.
- 1929–1940: Ven Oliver J. Kimberley
- 1940–1947: Ven Donald Haultain
- 1966–1971: Ven Peter Mann (Later Bishop of Dunedin)
- 1971–1989: Ven Frederick Ford
- 2006: Ven Richard Ellena (Later Bishop of Nelson)
