= Christ Church Cathedral, Nelson =

Christ Church Cathedral
- Nelson Anglican Cathedral
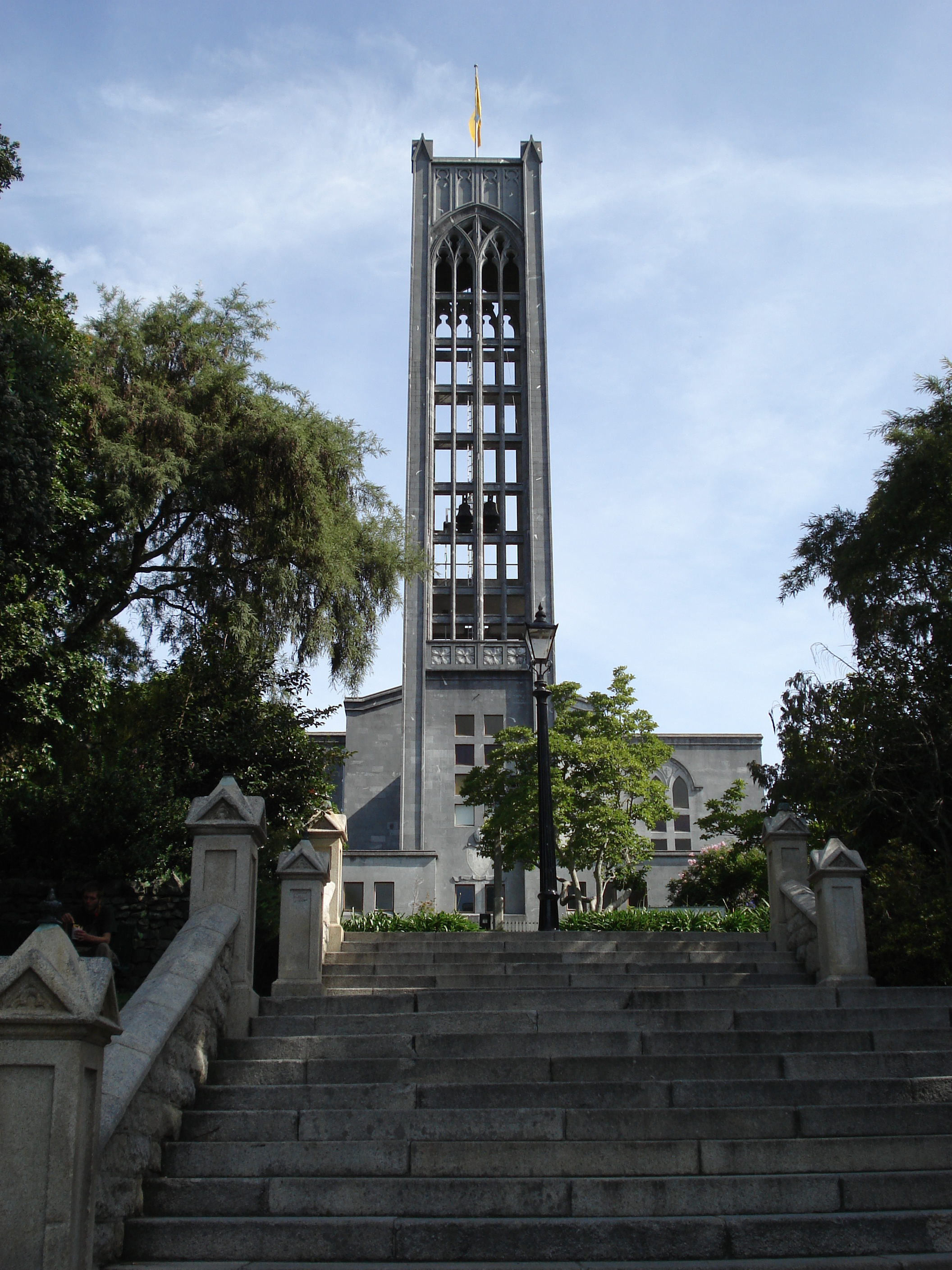
- Christ Church Cathedral from Trafalgar Street, Nelson
- Christ Church Cathedral
- 41°16′34″S 173°17′02″E
- Address: 1 Trafalgar Square, Nelson
- Country: New Zealand
- Denomination: Anglican
- Website: nelsoncathedral.nz

History
- Status: Cathedral
- Founded: August 1925
- Dedicated: 3 December 1932; 28 May 1965
- Consecrated: 14 April 1972 by Bishop Peter Sutton

Architecture
- Functional status: Active
- Architectural type: Church
- Style: Modernist Gothic Revival
- Years built: 1925 – 1965

Specifications
- Capacity: 350 people
- Length: 58 metres (190 ft)
- Width: 27 metres (89 ft)
- Height: 35 metres (115 ft)

Administration
- Province: Anglican Church in Aotearoa, New Zealand and Polynesia
- Diocese: Nelson
- Parish: Nelson Central

Clergy
- Bishop: Steve Maina
- Dean: Dr Graham O'Brien

Christ Church Cathedral is an Anglican cathedral church at 1 Trafalgar Square, Nelson, New Zealand. The cathedral serves as the seat for the Bishop of Nelson, currently Steve Maina, and is the mother church for the Diocese of Nelson of the Anglican Church in Aotearoa, New Zealand and Polynesia.

With seating for 350 people, the cathedral was completed in the Modernist Gothic Revival style, and is 58 metres (190 ft) in length and 27 metres (89 ft) wide. The tower is 35 metres (115 ft) high.

== History ==
The original church was erected in 1851 and was designed by Frederick Thatcher at a different site; it was enlarged in 1859. In 1866 the church was named as Christ Church Cathedral and enlarged again.

Construction of the current cathedral began in 1925 and was finished in 1965. The cathedral was consecrated by Bishop Peter Sutton on 14 April 1972.

The majority of marble was sourced from the Pakikiruna Range, near Tākaka. When construction started the marble was to be used in blocks. However, after the 1929 Murchison earthquake this was deemed too risky and far too expensive. The marble was then ground down and mixed with plaster to give the unusual appearance and colour.

The steps are constructed from granite. This granite was obtained from Tonga Beach in Tasman Bay. There is now a monument that overlooks Trafalgar Street and celebrates 100 years of settlement in Nelson.

== Organ ==
The church's first pipe organ was constructed by T.C. Lewis in London and shipped to Nelson in 1871. The organ was then rebuilt in 1932. After 30 years of use the organ was overhauled and now consists of 2500 pipes. The organ is spread over three manuals and pedals and has a detached electric-action console situated on a gallery opposite the pipes in the chancel.

== Gallery ==
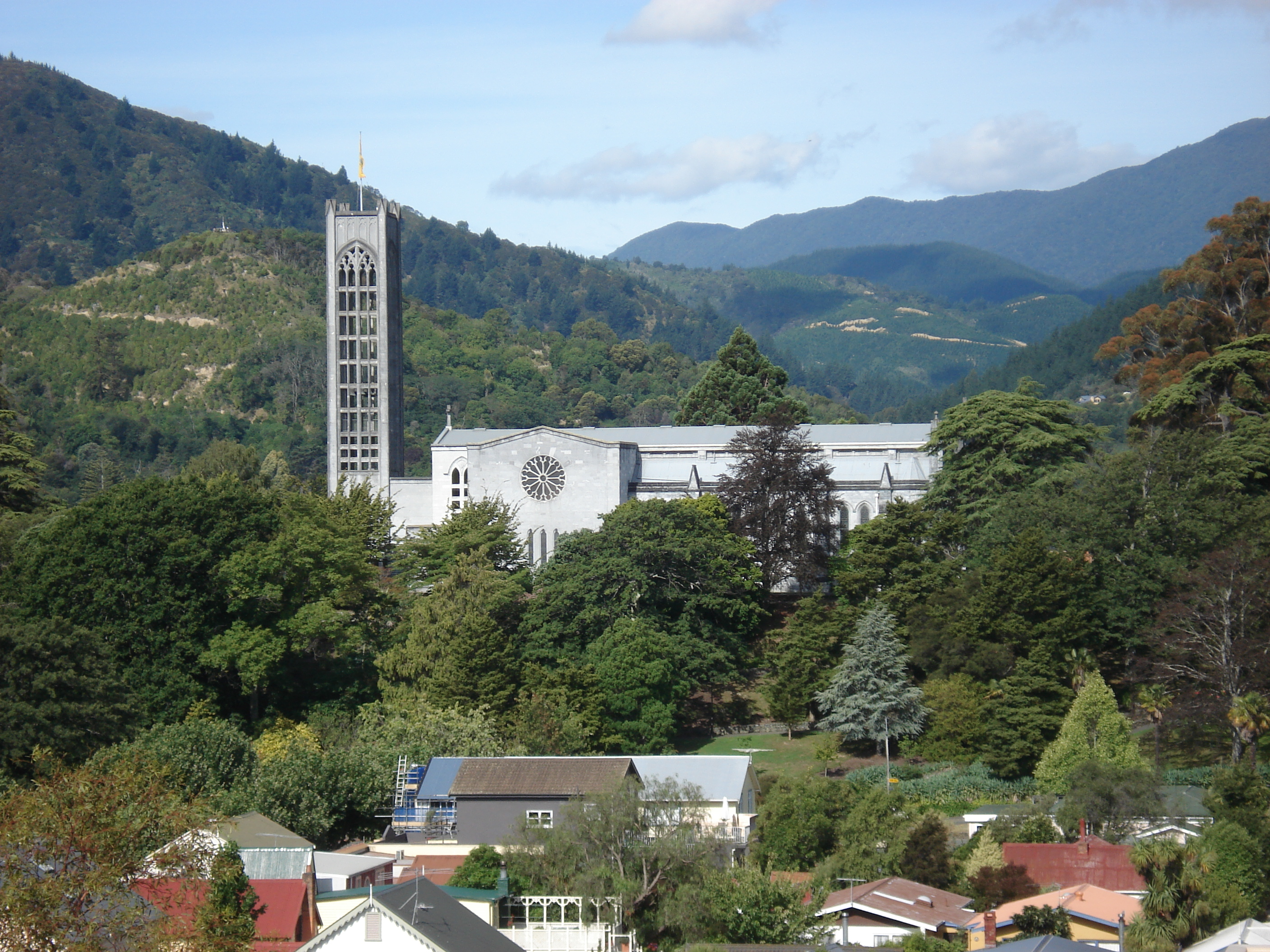
Christ Church Cathedral looking east. "Centre of New Zealand" visible to the left of tower.

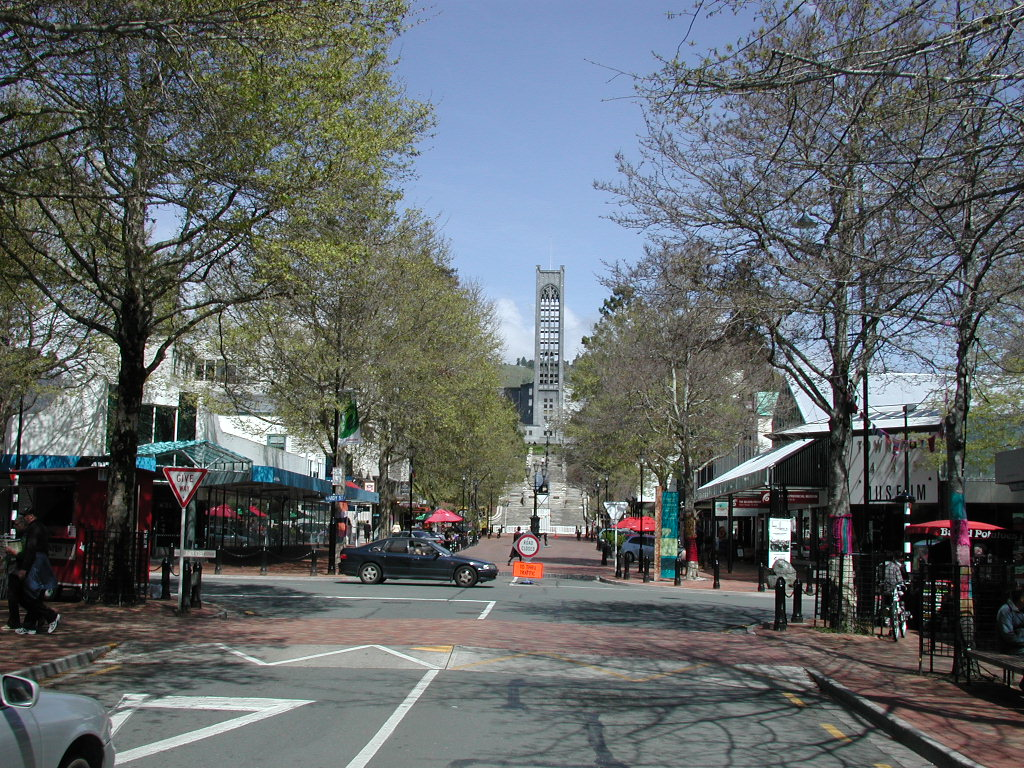
The cathedral acts as a terminating vista for Trafalgar Street, one of central Nelson's main retail streets.

== Vicars of Christ Church Parish ==
- Rev Charles L. Reay 1842-1847
- Rev Henry F. Butt 1847-1857-Note, laid the foundation stone of Christ Church Nelson.
- Rev Henry M. Turton 1863-1864
- Rev George H. Johnstone 1864 1873
- Rev James Leighton 1874-1884-Note, was also appointed Chaplain to the Bishop, and was a chaplain to the Nelson City Rifles in 1875.
- Ven John P. Kempthorne 1885-1916-Note, was appointed Archdeacon of Waimea 1916-1926 and Canon of Nelson in 1916.

== Dean & Vicar of Nelson Cathedral ==
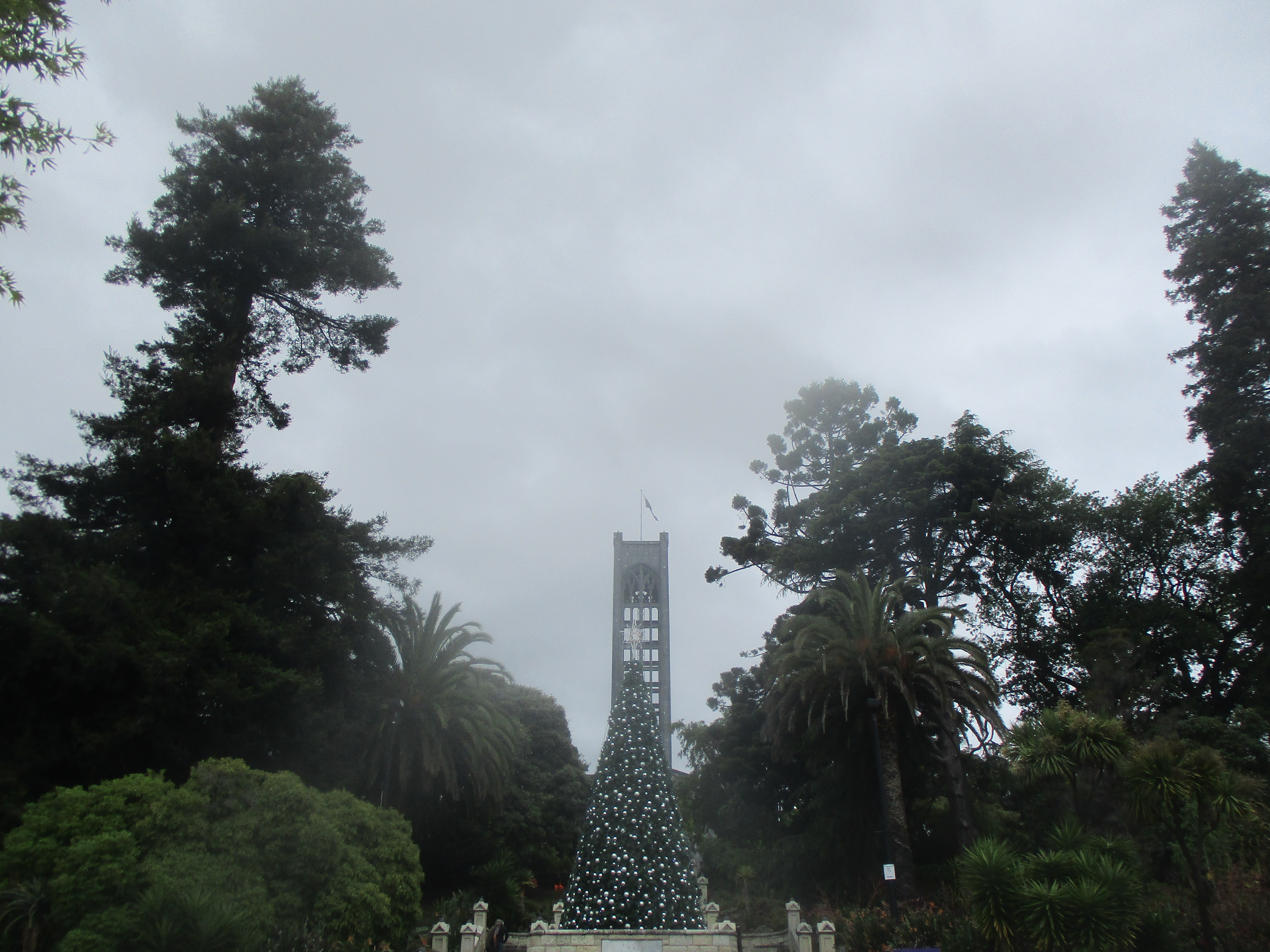

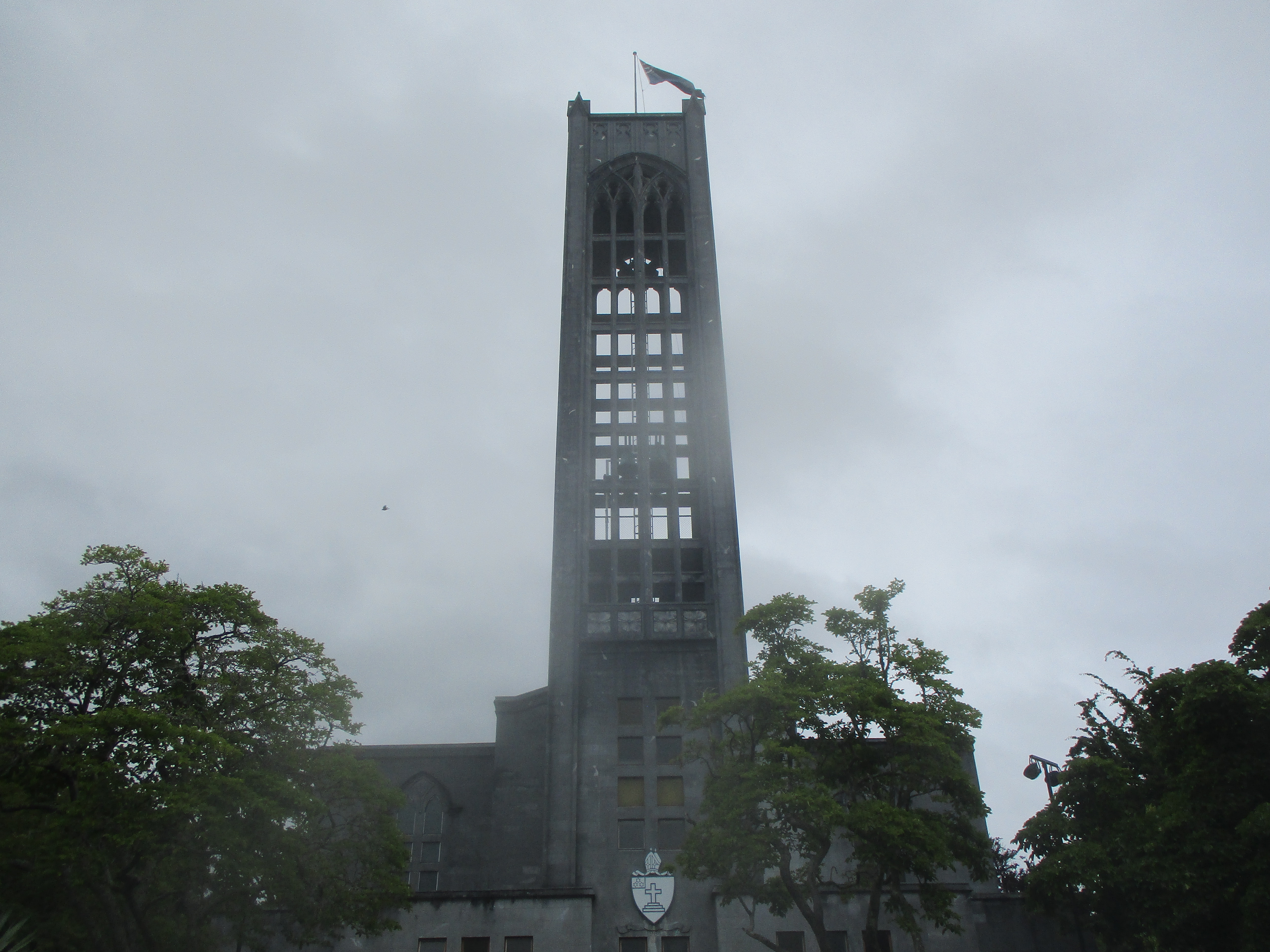

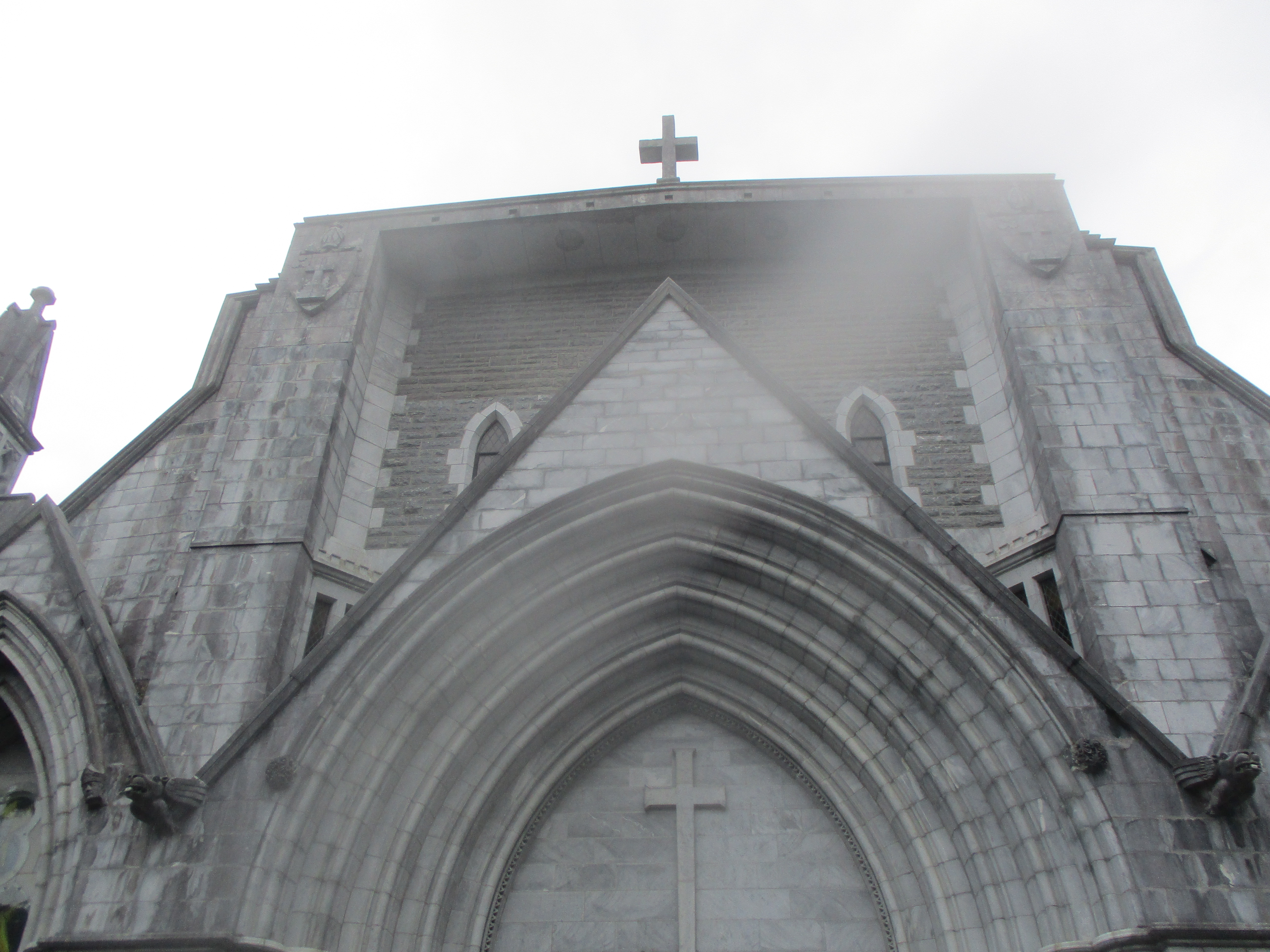

- Very Rev George E. Weeks 1916-1922-Note, from August 1916-1919 he was commissioned as a Chaplain Class IV to the 1st NZEF on Home Service.
- Very Rev Charles F. Askew 1923-1933
- Very Rev Henry J. Raymer 1933-1934-Note, 1901-1902 acting Chaplain British Imperial Forces South African War and later 1937-1941 served as Chaplain Bromley College diocese of Rochester.
- Very Rev Percy B. Haggitt 1934-1950
- Very Rev Eric A. Gowing 1950-1956
- Very Rev William Bretton 1956-1970
- Very Rev Gavin Yates 1970-1981
- Very Rev Michael J. Hurd 1981-1993
- Very Rev Charles Tyrrell QSO 1994-2010
- (Rev Cannon Tony Andrews (Acting Dean and Priest in Charge)
- Very Rev Nick Kirk 2011-2016
- (Rev Owen Haring (Priest in Charge)
- Very Rev Mike Hawke 2016-2021
- Very Rev Dr Graeme O'Brien 2021-

== Associate Priest's Nelson Cathedral ==
- Rev Allen Michel
- Rev Ren Kempthorne
- Rev Yvonne McLean
- Rev Barry Price
- Rev Simon W
- Rev Nigel Whinney
- Rev Steve Jordan (also Cathedral Precentor)

== Deacon Curates Nelson Cathedral ==
- Rev William A. Whyte 1877
