= Harry Hilliard =

Harry Hilliard may refer to:

- Harry Hilliard (cricketer)
- Harry Hilliard (actor)
