= Louise Taplin =

English-Australian nurse

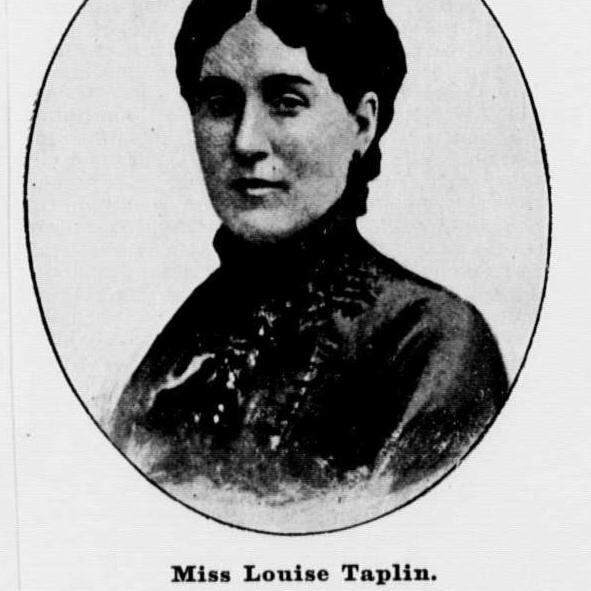
Portrait of Louise Taplin

Louise Taplin (1855–1901) was an English-born Australian nurse, children's home matron and charity worker.

== Early life ==
Louise Taplin was born in or near London in 1855. She began her career in nursing in the 1870s in Paris, working in a large hospital there where she learned various technical training relating to nursing. After her time in France she returned to England and took a post of governess. She travelled with the family to Amsterdam, where her employer was seeking treatment from Johann Georg Mezger, a celebrated doctor and massage therapist. There she learnt massage from Mezger and he offered her the post of his assistant, however she refused. She next went to work for the Carapanos, a Greek family of wealth and influence.

After a bout of ill health from her brother Will, she decided that they both should immigrate to Australia where it was believed the climate was better suited for convalescence.

== Career ==
In 1886 she was appointed matron of The Infants' Home Ashfield, a refuge for unmarried mothers and their children. During her time she oversaw building works to provide an isolation ward for mothers and children whom were suffering from contagious disease and illness, a dedicated playroom for the children and an onsite laundry.

During 1893–1894 with a banking crisis in Australia and diminishing grants from government it was believed The Infants' Home would have to close. Taplin did not want to see the children in want of a home, so she offered to work for free during this time of hardship.

Before her tenure the mortality rate was 36% for the infants, however during her oversight of the organisation the mortality rate of the infants dropped to as low as 7% during the year of 1893.

=== Death ===
Taplin died on 21 May 1901 after a prolonged bout of pneumonia. She is buried at St John's Church Ashfield.
