= St John's, Ashfield =

- St John the Baptist Anglican Church
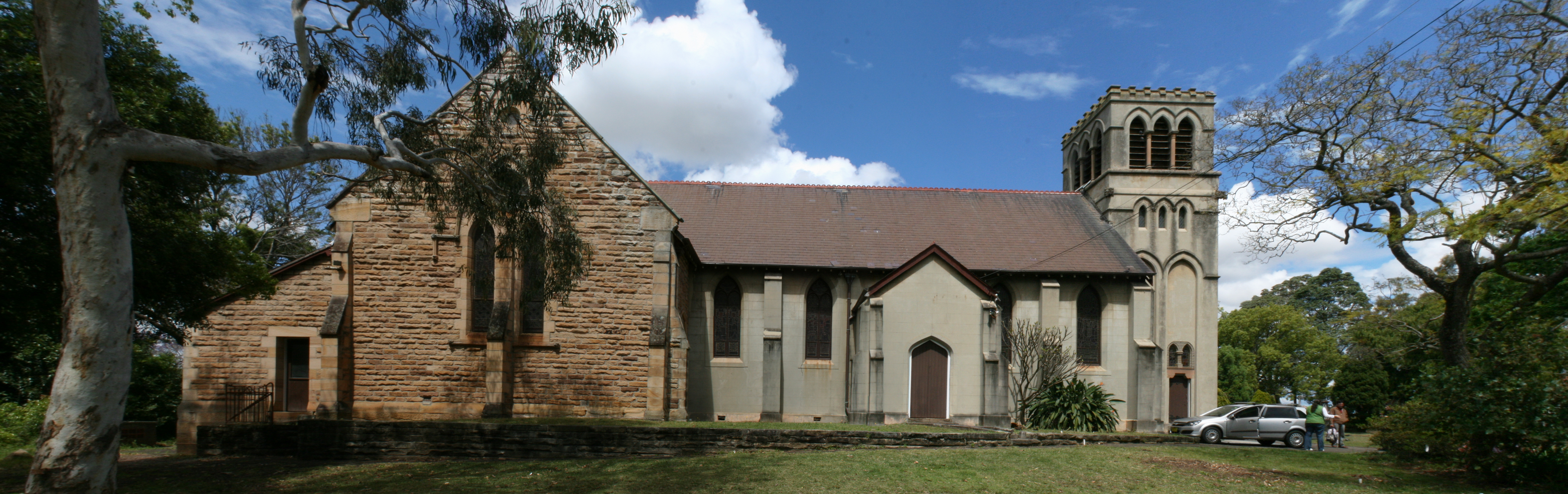
- The northern side of the church building. The central rendered section (nave) is the original church building. The sandstone section on the left (transept and chancel) was completed in 1875. The tower on the right was added in 1901.

- Location in Greater Sydney
- 33°52′54″S 151°07′40″E
- Location: Alt and Bland Streets, Ashfield, Sydney, New South Wales
- Country: Australia
- Denomination: Anglican Church of Australia
- Website: www.cciw.church/ashfield

History
- Status: Church
- Founded: 9 September 1840
- Founder: Joseph Kidd Walpole
- Consecrated: 19 August 1845

Architecture
- Functional status: Active
- Heritage designation: Local Government
- Designated: 20 December 1985
- Architect: Edmund Blacket
- Years built: 1841-45

Administration
- Diocese: Sydney
- Archdeaconry: South Sydney Region
- Deanery: Christ Church Inner West

Clergy
- Rector: Andrew Katay (since 2005)

A map of the St John's site. Charlotte and Julia streets are named after two of the daughters of Elizabeth Underwood, who donated the first land to build the church. Julia's husband also became the fourth rector. Bland street is named after another of the early benefactors, William Bland.

St John the Baptist Anglican Church is an active Anglican church located between Alt and Bland Streets, Ashfield, a suburb of Sydney, New South Wales, Australia. Founded in 1840, on land donated by Elizabeth Underwood, the church building is the oldest authenticated surviving building in Ashfield, having been built at the time when subdivision increased the population density sufficiently to turn Ashfield into a town. It was also the first church built along the Parramatta Road which linked the early colonial towns of Sydney and Parramatta. The earliest remaining parts of the building are one of the first Sydney designs by the colonial architect Edmund Blacket, who later became renowned for his ecclesiastical architecture.

The expansive church grounds contain a cemetery dating back to 1845 that contains the remains of many notable Ashfield residents. Australia's only memorial to Australian Air Force Cadets occupies a prominent position near the entrance to the church. The St John's site has been listed on the Local Environment Plan Heritage Schedule, and the Register of the National Trust of Australia.

St John's is one of three churches, along with St Albans, Five Dock, and St Oswald's, Haberfield, which make up Christ Church Inner West, operating within the parish of Ashfield, Five Dock, and Haberfield, as part of the South Sydney Region of the Anglican Diocese of Sydney. The church has had 18 rectors, including William George Hilliard who later became the Bishop of Nelson. Andrew Katay has been rector since early 2005.

== History ==
St John's was the first church to be established along Parramatta Road between the colonial towns of Sydney and Parramatta (then known as Rose Hill), during a time of rapid church building when many of the oldest churches in Sydney were erected. Since 1810 the Parish of Ashfield had extended from Balmain to Strathfield, and from Enfield to the Parramatta River, and in 1840 this was formalized into an ecclesiastical district.

=== Early contributors ===
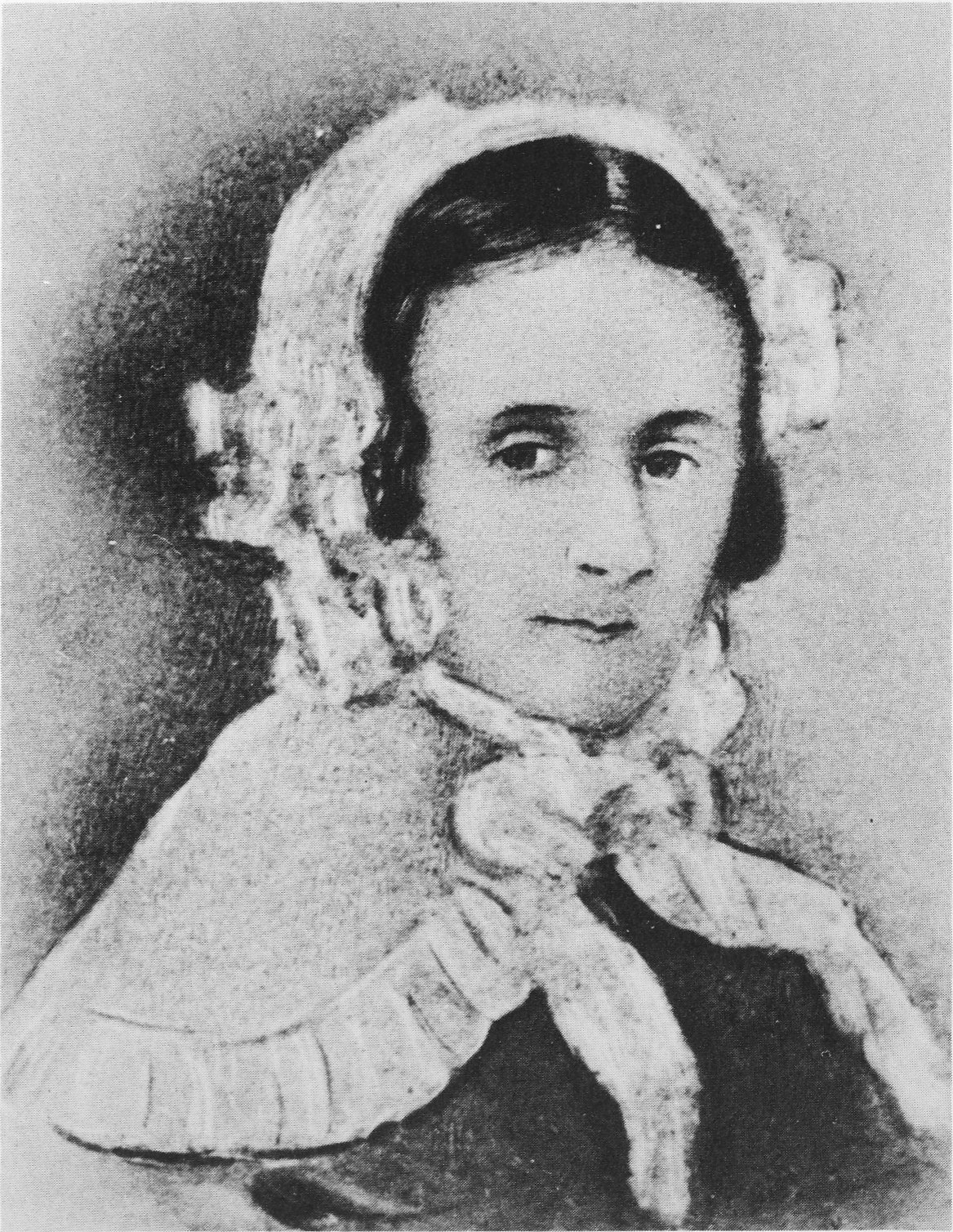
Elizabeth Underwood

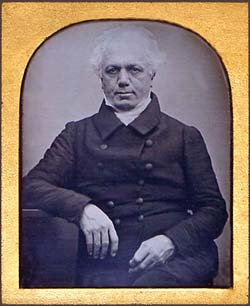
William Bland

The first portion of grounds, an area of 1 acre, 2 roods, and 36 perches (a total of 0.698 ha), was provided as a gift by the local landowner Elizabeth Underwood who was subdividing "Ashfield Park". The Bishop of Australia, William Grant Broughton added urgency by expressing his "intention of having a Place of Worship erected immediately, on the allotment of land appropriated for that purpose". Another benefactor was William Bland, a doctor and politician who had been sent to the colony having been convicted of manslaughter after pistol duel which left his opponent mortally wounded, and after whom Bland street is named. He gave a donation of £200 and land. Fellow local medical practitioner, James Bowman, contributed a "similarly munificent donation". By mid-1839 the funds received were thought to be sufficient to commence building. The exact location was determined in February 1840, and appeals continued to fund a building of sufficient size for the surrounding population.

=== Church building ===
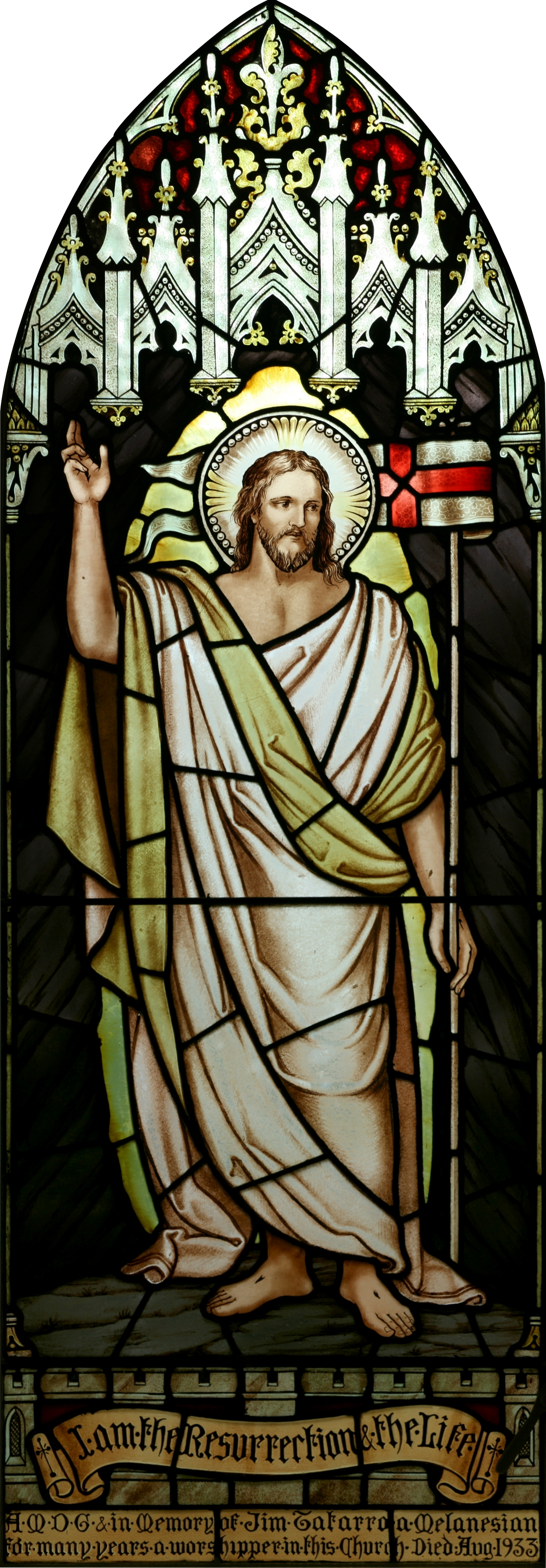
A stained glass panel in the chancel, unveiled in 1934, illustrating Jesus' words "I am the Resurrection and the Life" (John 11:25)

The church was founded on 9 September 1840. The service on that day was read by the first rector, Joseph Kidd Walpole, who had come to the district from Christ Church, Kelso, and had begun to plan the church building. W. G. Broughton made an address at the ceremony. The anniversary sermon was preached by Robert Allwood.

This Foundation Stone of a church dedicated to the honor and worship of Almighty God! and to be denominated 'The Church of St. John the Baptist' was laid the 9th day of September, 1840. By the Right Reverend Father in God William Lord Bishop of Australia in the Fourth Year of the reign of Queen Victoria. Sir George Gipps, Knight. Governor. Rev. Joseph Kidd Walpole, Minister. Among those that are born of women there is not a greater Prophet than John the Baptist; but he that is last in the Kingdom of God is greater than he. Luke vii, 28.

— Plaque inside the foundation stone, location unknown.

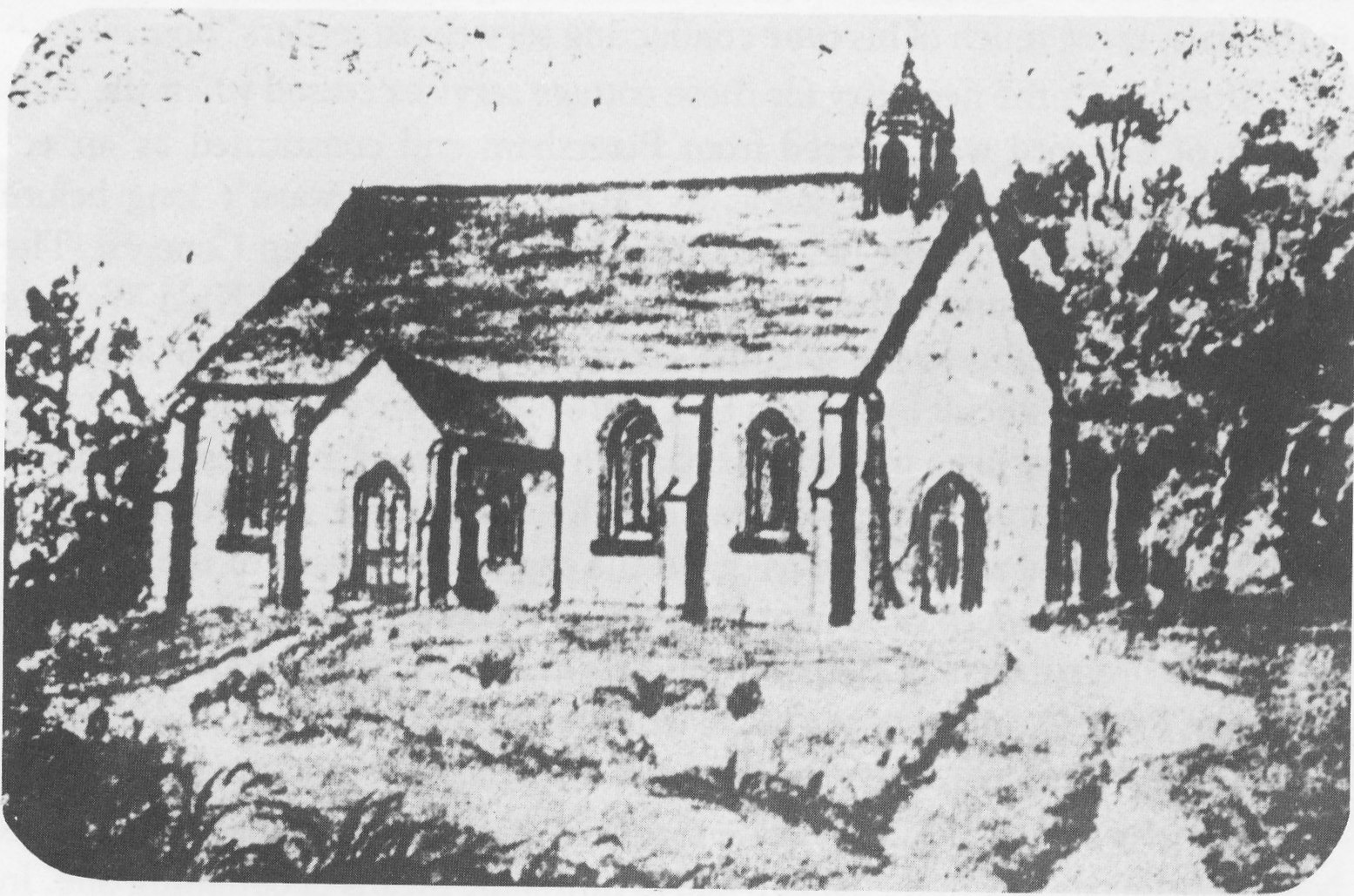
The original church building, measuring 61 feet (19 m) by 31 feet (9.4 m).

Building work on the church began in 1841, but construction came to a standstill due to construction problems and insufficient subscriptions. The following year the colonial architect Edmund Blacket, as one of his first assignments after arriving in Sydney, was requested to inspect the church's walls, then still under construction. As a result of his report, the walls were demolished and re-erected, although continued funding problems, and the transfer of J. K. Walpole to Windsor caused further delays. The church was licensed for operation on 1 October 1843. Much of the interior woodwork was carved by the third rector, Frederick Wilkinson. The roof was strengthened in around 1845 by the installation of timber support columns. On 16 August 1845, at a cost of £100 the church purchased an additional 2.5 acres (1.0 ha) of land from Elizabeth Underwood (who remained a parishioner until her death, and is buried in a prominent grave within the church cemetery). The church was eventually consecrated on 19 August 1845.

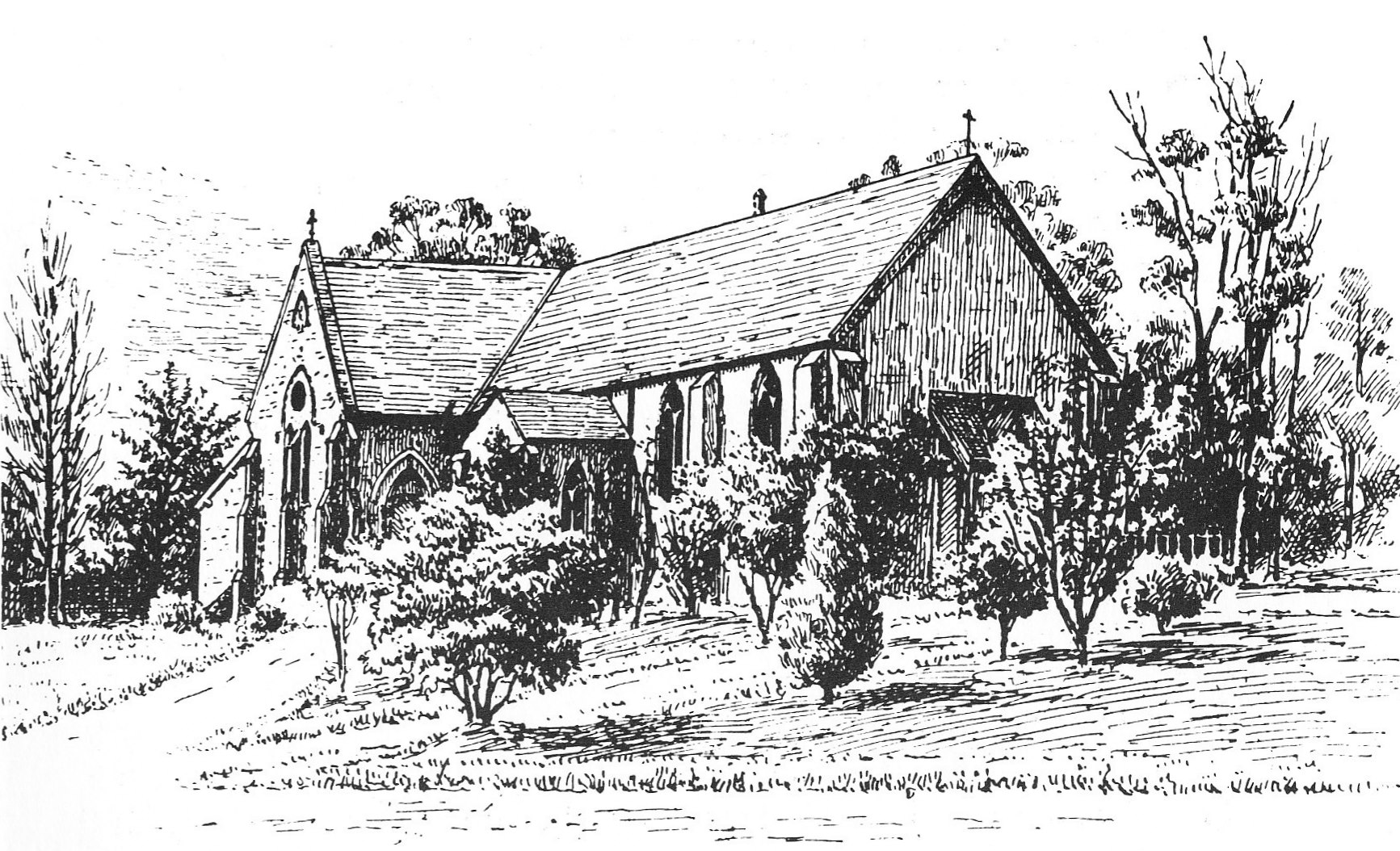
The exterior after the 1875 additions

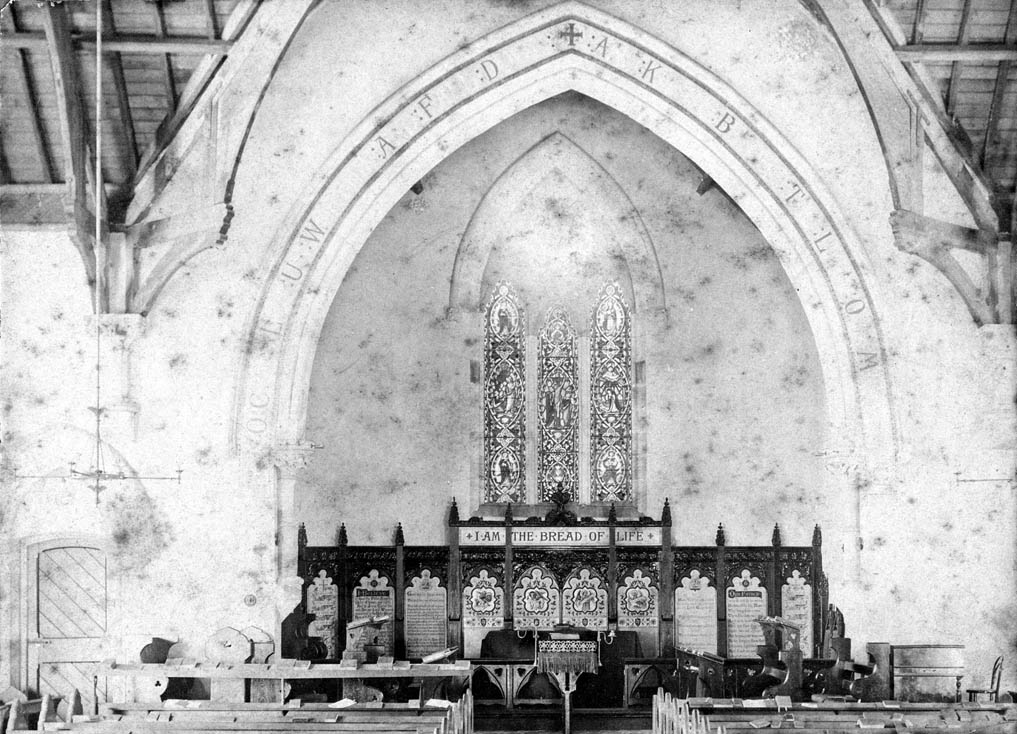
The crossing and chancel as it appeared in 1883

After 29 years, as the Bishop of Sydney Frederic Barker put it "the population of Sydney had invaded these sylvan shades", so an expansion was required. Blacket designed the current stone transept and chancel, to transform the church into a cruciform plan. These were built during the period 1874–1875 at a cost of around £150 – raised without the help of grants from the government or the English societies. The foundation stone of the addition was laid by Barker on 24 October 1874, and included a copy of Australian Churchman and The Sydney Morning Herald. At the time this addition accommodated an extra 250 seats, bringing the total capacity to 446.

Construction of the choir vestry and a wooden porch outside the western door were completed in 1885, and dedicated by Bishop Alfred Barry. This work was overseen by the Blacket brothers, who had followed the trade of their late father.

Arthur Blacket then designed the west tower. The eight-bell peal was ordered from England after a generous bequest by one of the "Melanesian boys", David Marguay, and subsequent fundraising. The tower was then quickly constructed at a cost of around £250 in memory of the recently deceased rector James Christian Corlette, and dedicated as The Corlette Memorial Tower on 1 November 1901. The memorial bells proved depressing amongst the local populace, and were rearranged in 1904, with louvres added to the previously open arches. This was apparently ineffective, as the bells were removed within a few years.

=== Music ===
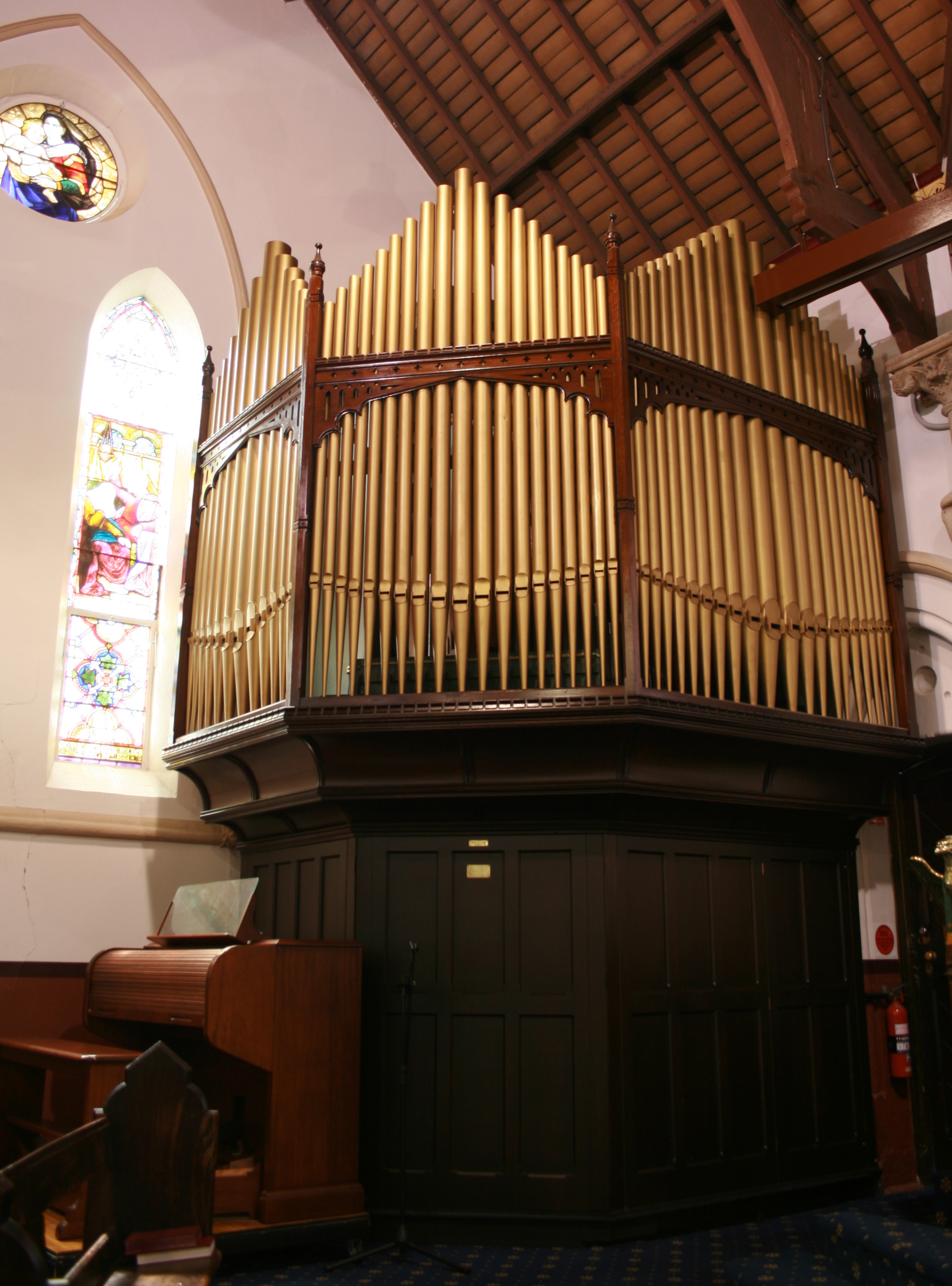
The 1883 Hill and Son pipe organ, located in the north-eastern corner of the transept

Prior to the installation of a pipe organ, a seraphine and then a harmonium were used for musical accompaniment. The first organ was installed above the gallery at the western end of the church by William Davidson at the request of the rector J. C. Corlette, and was transferred to the south transept in about 1879, where it remained until 1882 when it was sold to St Bartholomew's, Pyrmont, and later St Luke's, Northmead.

The 1883 Hill and Son organ, including 844 pipes, costing a total of £550, was installed in 1884, and located in the north-east corner of the transept. It is still in use, with original pipework, making it faithful to the original tones. The organ was refurbished and rebuilt in 1950, 1975, and 2008.

The 1950 change from mechanical to electrical action was motivated by removing the increasingly noisy pedals and trackers. This refurbishment also included detachment of the console (to the other side of the transept), and replacement of the bellows with a "pressure equaliser". The façade pipes were sprayed to a dull gold colour, covering over the original diapering, described disparagingly at the time as "all over the pipes without much rhyme or reason; fleurs-de-lys in profusion, dots, bands, triangles in all the colours of the rainbow rioted in confusion". This work was carried out by R. A. and D. A. Wiltshire.

By 1975 the organ had become unplayable, and a reconversion to mechanical action was undertaken. The console was moved back to the organ side of the transept, with the action going backward under the floor into the organ. This necessitated removal of floor joists and foundation piers, but the unsupported floor caused further problems long term, and during the 2008 rebuild it was re-electrified.

Between 2006 and 2008 Sydney firm "John W Parker – Pipe Organ Builders" refurbished the organ, returning the soundboard action to electric, providing a new roll-top 'detached' console, and an entirely new wind supply and bellows. The swell box which had been discarded in the 1975 rebuild was reinstated, and the pedal Bourdon 16' stop was extended to 8' pitch. Octave couplers were provided in Sub and Octave pitches on the Swell also. All manual pipework was washed, cleaned and regulated to original Hill standards and tonality.

The church had a significant choral history, with significant events often celebrated with a full choir, sometimes accompanied by an orchestra. In the late 19th century the St John's choir participated in regional choir festivals.

=== Site development ===
A small hall for Sunday school was erected in 1865 by the generosity of L. H. Smythe. By 1895 the hall had fallen into disrepair, and the needs of the children had outgrown it. The current Parish Hall was planned to replace it. The memorial stone for the replacement building was laid by the Primate of Australia, William Saumarez Smith in inclement weather on 2 February 1895. The architect was E. A. Scott, and his building design was of a "domestic style... with a highly decorated front". It cost £625 10s, was complete within three months, and seated up to 400. However, by 1903, the Sunday school had once again outgrown the space available, and an additional infants classroom was built nearby. This is now called the Small Hall, and is used as a classroom for the St John's Preschool.

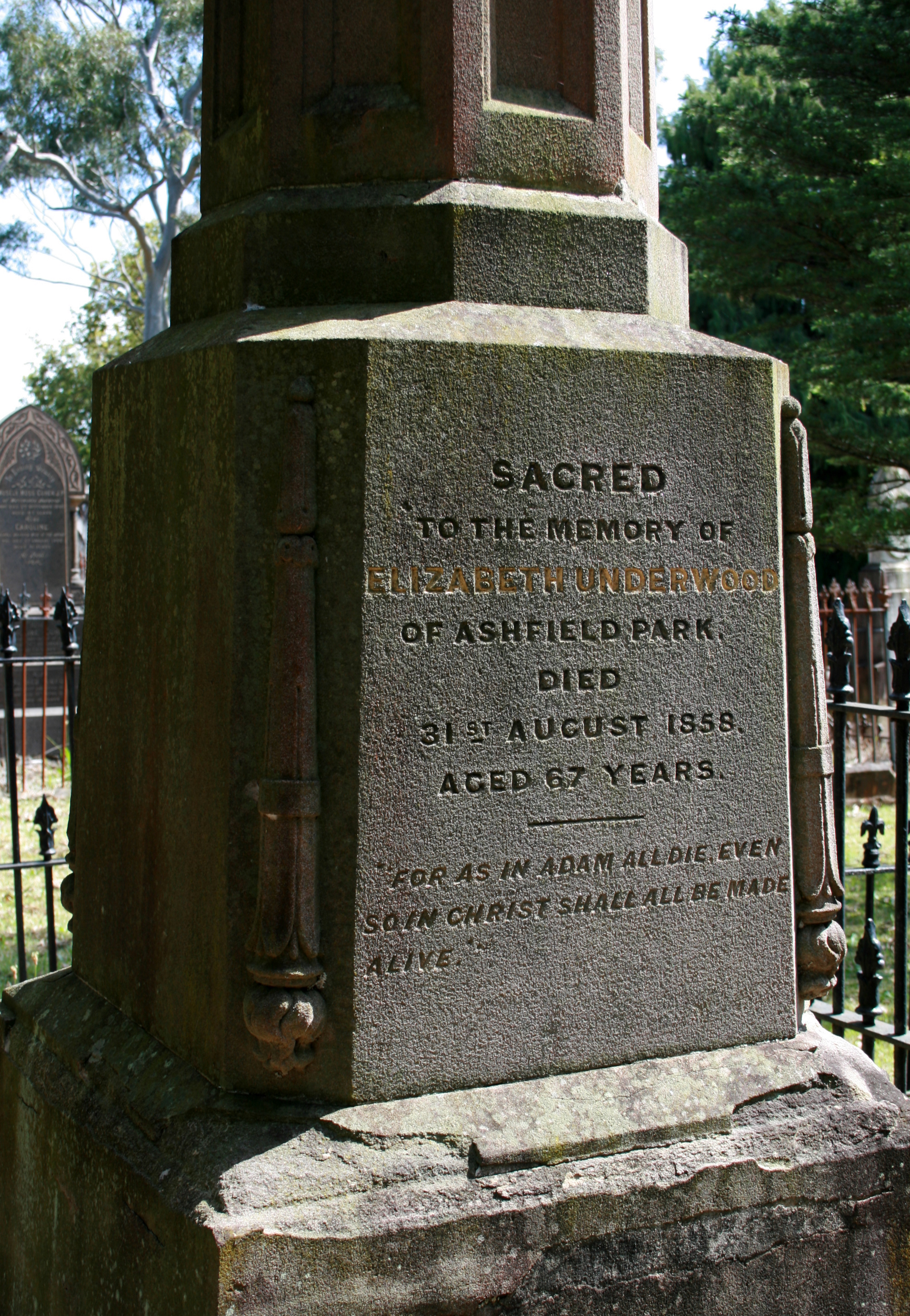
Elizabeth Underwood's tombstone

A rectory was first provided for the rector J. C. Corlette and his large family in 1879. A block of land, located on what is now the corner of Rectory Avenue and Alt Street, was purchased for £444, and the foundation stone was laid by Bishop Barker in 1880. This original rectory was sold in 1922 for £1800. The current rectory, on the main grounds of the church, was founded by Archbishop John Charles Wright in the same year, during the rectorship of William George Hilliard, and built at a cost of £2500.

Gravel pathways lined with Phoenix canariensis palms, the lawn in front of the church, and the stone churchyard fence were also constructed in the 1920s. The Alt Street wall was erected in 1922, and dedicated to the previous rector Alfred Yarnold. The Bland Street wall was dedicated in 1927 by Archdeacon Davies, and commemorates one of the key contributors, R. A. Forsaith.

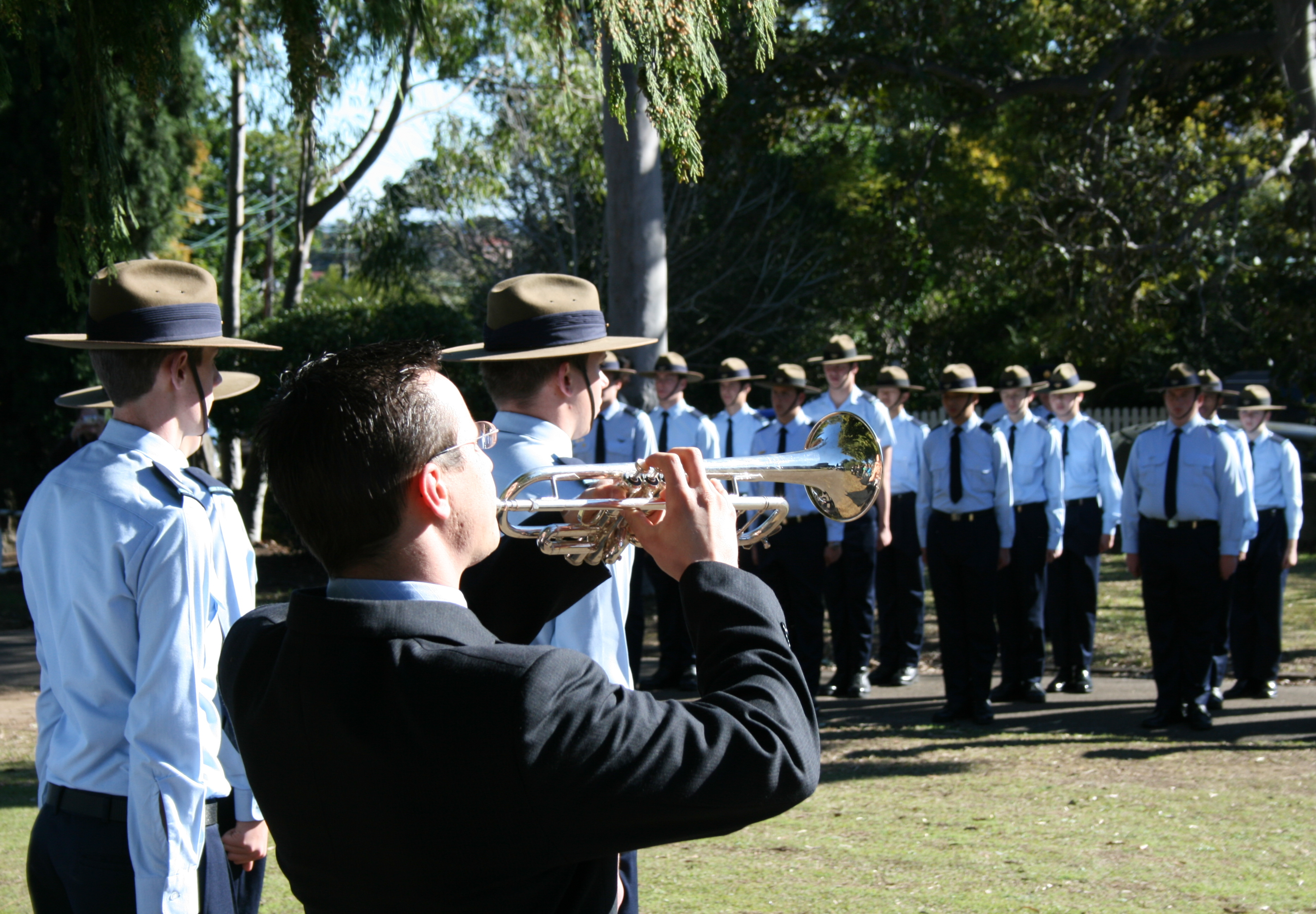
Australian Air Force Cadets on parade at the annual memorial service in 2007

The cemetery, which had been in existence since soon after the foundation of the church (the first interment was Frederick Underwood, Elizabeth's 11-month-old grandson, on 1 May 1845), was consecrated by the Archbishop of Sydney, Howard West Kilvinton Mowll, on 8 September 1934. By this stage it reportedly already contained the remains of 1,396 people. He was asked by the rector of the time to "set apart the area, containing 4 acres and 4 perches (1.63 ha), as a burial-place for the bodies of Christian people living in and about Ashfield".

Australia's only memorial to Australian Air Force Cadets occupies a prominent position on the grounds, and a memorial service attended by the Cadets has been held annually since it was opened by the State Governor Lieutenant General John Northcott in 1946. It was built by Squadron Leader Arthur Whitehurst who had commanded a squadron at Ashfield during the period 1941–1946, and whose son Douglas Arthur Whitehurst had died in action in World War II.

A children's playground was installed near the Alt St boundary in 2011, and opened by Ashfield Municipal Council Mayor Ted Cassidy and Strathfield MP Charles Casuscelli.

=== Regional influence ===
A number of local street names were derived from the presence of St John's. Church Street, which ends directly opposite the church entrance, was originally the track used by Burwood residents to reach the church, using a conveniently located fallen tree across Iron Cove Creek.

As the population of Sydney's Inner West grew, many of the Anglican churches in the area were established by the congregation of St John's (including four during the final thirty years of the nineteenth century). These include Balmain, Burwood, Five Dock, St Thomas' Enfield (declared a separate parish in 1868), and St Oswald's Haberfield (1908). Because of this involvement, St John's was later referred to as the "Mother Church of Western Suburbs".

=== Rectors ===
St. John's has had eighteen rectors to date.

Ordinal	Rector	Term start	Term end	Image	Developments
1	Joseph Kidd Walpole	1840	1842		Walpole was originally from England, and went on mission to Madras in 1836, but his health gave way, and he was transferred to New South Wales. He was ordained as a Deacon in 1936, and as a Priest in 1937. After disappointing progress on the building, he was transferred to Richmond after two years.
2	William Stone, B.A.	1842	1843		Stone was the rector during the period 1842–1843. He grew up in a clerical family in Ireland, married his first cousin, and had nine children, seven of whom joined their parents on the journey to Australia in 1841. When appointed at St John's, he set aside a room in their family home, deemed by the Bishop as temporarily licensed as a place of worship since the church was not yet complete. At the time he was also the minister of the Parish of Concord, and earned a government stipend of £150. He was transferred to Sutton Forest in 1843.
3	Frederick Wilkinson, M.A.	1843	1854		He personally carved much of the woodwork in St Johns. During his rectorship, he also organised for St Mary's church to be built in Balmain, and then St Thomas' Enfield. Once St Mary's was built, he presided alternately in Ashfield and Balmain. During his time at Ashfield, the Wilkinsons lived in a "picturesque, many-gabled wooden house called The Meads in Enfield" (near Burwood road), where he had a large workshop for his wood-carving. He also established a private school at The Meads, which enjoyed a "high reputation as the best collegiate school in the colony". Apart from a return trip to England (serving as the ship's chaplain during the journeys), he continued his leadership of St John's until June 1854 when he accepted 'a special commission for the cure' at Holy Trinity at Millers Point.
4	Thomas Hatham / Hattam Wilkinson	1854	1860		He had originally come to the colonies in the company of his father's brother, Frederick. Since then he had been curate-in-charge at Balmain under his uncle, married Julia Sarah Underwood (Elizabeth's daughter) at St John's, served a short period as chaplain to Darlinghurst Gaol and three years as the assistant minister of St John the Baptist, Canberra. After his uncle left St John's, he became the rector. After leaving St John's, he moved to Enfield, and later Appin, finally returning for burial in the St John's cemetery after his death in 1876.
5	William Lumsdain	1860	1865		Lumsdain was newly ordained and he had come to Australia with his two brothers and a sister in 1836 in the charge of Bishop Broughton. When he became rector, he rented Ashfield Park House, Elizabeth Underwood's original house as his family residence. Along with Ashfield, he simultaneously held the incumbency for the parishes of Burwood, Enfield, and Five Dock. During his time at St John's, two of his children died of diphtheria on the same day. After finishing at St John's, he continued to serve at Five Dock and Burwood. He died in 1902 aged 78 and is buried in the St John's cemetery.
6	William Cecil Cave-Browne-Cave	1865	1867		Cave-Browne-Cave was a grandson of the ninth Cave-Browne-Cave Baronet. He was recently married when he arrived at St John's. Later in his career he held the rectorship at St Thomas' North Sydney.
7	Canon James Christian Corlette, D.D.	1867	1900		Corlette's previous appointment had been in Jamberoo. He was married to Frances Edith Manning, a daughter of the politician Sir William Montagu Manning. In 1877 she was elected to the committee of the newly formed Infant's Home, as an indication of Anglican support. The home cared for abandoned babies, and was the subject of a storm of protest, with the Roman Catholic Cardinal Patrick Francis Moran accusing it of a "vindication of promiscuous practices". The Corlettes' eight children were all born during his time at St John's. Perhaps not surprisingly, during this period St John's first began to provide a residence for the rector. Corlette encouraged Ashfield's Melanesian population to worship at St John's, and many later returned to the islands as missionaries. He provided more frequent and regular services than his predecessor, and emphasized Saint's Days, Communion and music. During the period 1868–1884 he concurrently held the precentorship at St Andrew's Cathedral, and in 1897 again served there as canon. In 1893 he was chaplain to the Bishop of Sydney, and became rural dean of Petersham in 1895. Along with many of his family, he is buried in the St John's cemetery.
8	Alfred Yarnold	1901	1916		Yarnold's time at Ashfield were the final fifteen years of his career. Immediately previously he had spent nineteen years as the rector of Christ Church, Lavender Bay. Overlapping with his time at St John's, he was also the chaplain to the Archbishop of Sydney, and the rural dean of Petersham. One of Yarnold's curates was the Rev. Charles Clark, who would later father the Australian historian Manning Clark. Clark's mother was a teacher in the St John's Sunday School
9	William George Hilliard, M.A.	1916	1926		Hilliard was recently ordained when he joined St John's, having completed only a four-year curacy at Dulwich Hill. His first wife died during his time at St John's. When he completed his time at St John's, he became the Headmaster of a local private school, Trinity Grammar School. In 1934 he became the Bishop of Nelson. He was described as "one of the most popular evangelicals in the Church life of Australia, and a forceful preacher".
10	Ainslie Arthur Yeates, M.A.	1927	1928		Yeates came to Ashfield from St John's Woolwich. Soon after he arrived he suffered a breakdown in his health, was very sick throughout his time at Ashfield, and died after a four-year incumbency.
11	Herbert Stanley Cocks, B.A. Th.L.	1931	1939		Cocks brought with him a wide experience of church work. Having been ordained just before World War I he had been a chaplain for the A.I.F., and after demobilization a missionary, school principal, and chaplain in India. Most recently he had been rector of Holy Trinity, Erskineville.
12	Leonard Neville Sutton, M.A.	1939	1949		Sutton was a keen teacher, having previously been principal at St Andrew's Cathedral School, chaplain at The King's School, and vice-principal at Brighton Grammar School. He was very interested in the welfare of young people. This enthusiasm led him to start the St John's Preschool. The Sunday School also had 350 pupils at the time.
13	Frederick Allen Seymour Shaw, B.A. Th.L.	1949	1966		Shaw had already served as an assistant clergyman at St John's during 1930–1931. During that time, he was ordained. Eighteen years later he returned to St John's as the rector.
14	John R. Seddon, Th.L. Dip.R.E.	1966	1973		
15	Percy William "Bill" George Twine, Th.L. L.T.C.L.	1973	1980		Twine had long been an organ player, and inclined toward high church style. He died suddenly whilst still the rector.
16	Stanford Ronald Colefax, R.F.D. Dip.Th.	1980	1990		
17	Dennis P. Robinson, Th.L.	1990	2003		
18	Andrew Katay, B.D. M.Th.	2005	incumbent		Katay was previously a Senior Associate Minister at St. Barnabas, Broadway, and Anglican chaplain at The University of Sydney, while leading the staff team of the Sydney University Evangelical Union. His arrival at the church marked a change from two traditional communion services to congregations with a variety of styles.

=== Acting rectors ===
From time to time, an acting rector or locum tenens has taken on temporary leadership, or filled a gap between rectors.

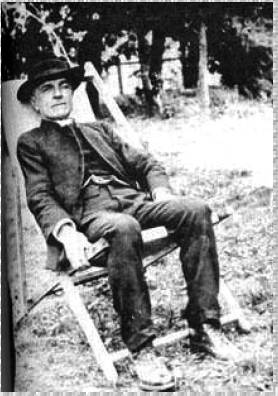
Arthur Corlette

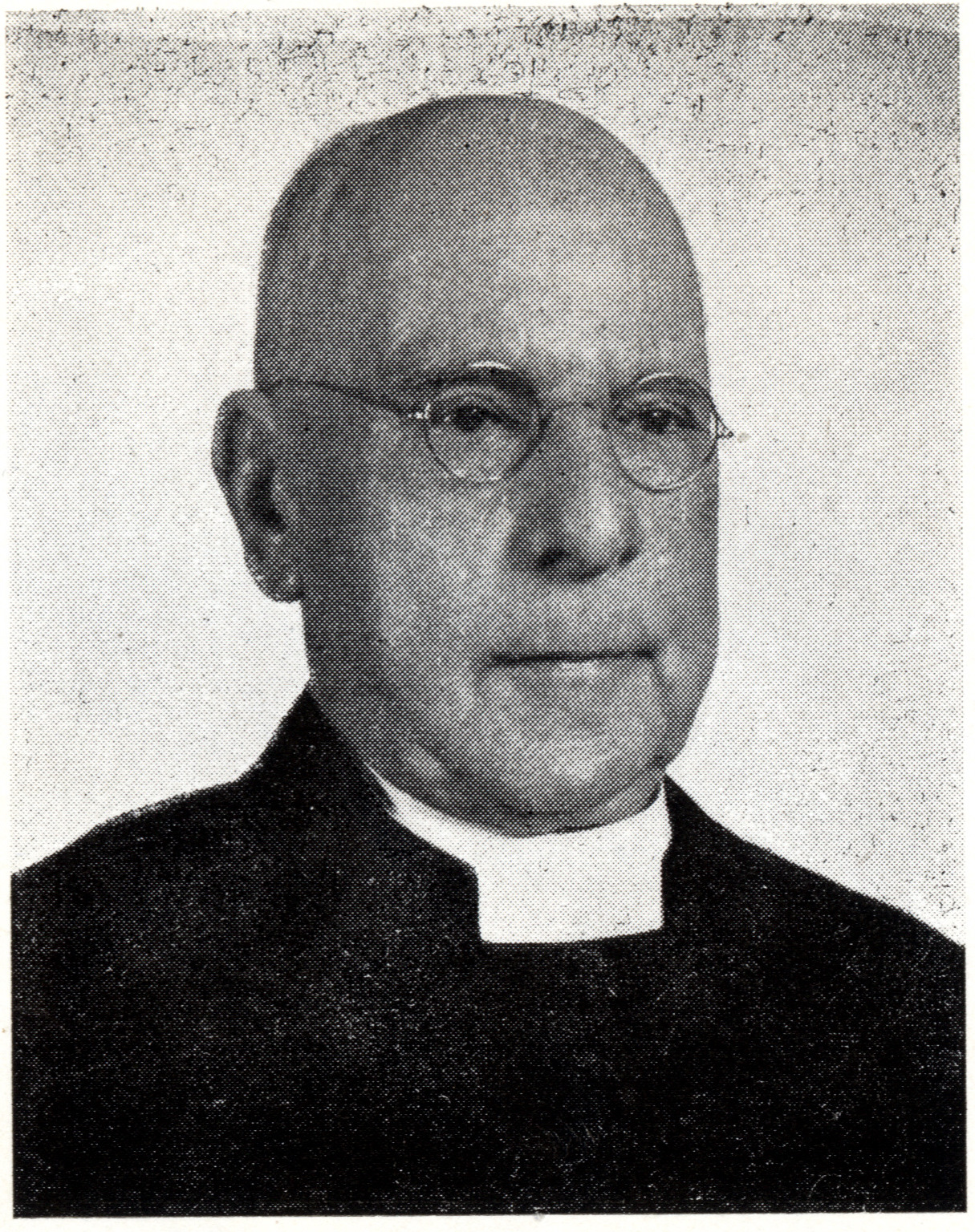
Arthur Killworth

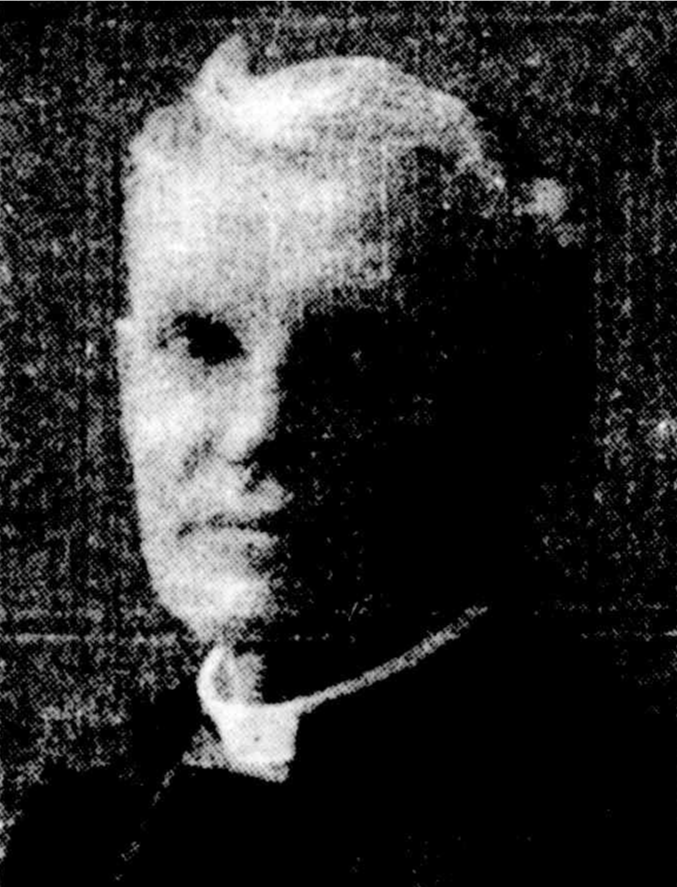
William Charlton

Septimus Hungerford was acting rector in 1879. He had previously been the rector of St Peter's Cathedral, Armidale. Later he became the incumbent at St Thomas' Enfield.

William Hough took temporary leadership in 1889 whilst J. C. Corlette undertook the precentorship of Goulburn Cathedral.

Arthur Christian Corlette stood in temporarily for his older brother J. C. Corlette in 1898.

Robert William Phayre Montgomery filled in at St John's after the death of J. C. Corlette, during the period 1900–1901. He was an Irishman who came to Australia as a missionary chaplain in 1891. After leaving St John's he took up a position as vicar of Cressy

Arthur Killworth M.A. LL.B., acted as rector during the period 1928–1931.

Archdeacon William Apedaile Charlton led St John's for four months in 1939 after the departure of H. S. Cocks. He had already served in Sydney churches for 55 years.

James R. Le Huray, Th.L. was the acting rector during the period 2004–2005. Rev J.R Le Huray came to St John's from Holy Trinity Kingsford, where he had served for 27 years as Rector.

=== Education ===
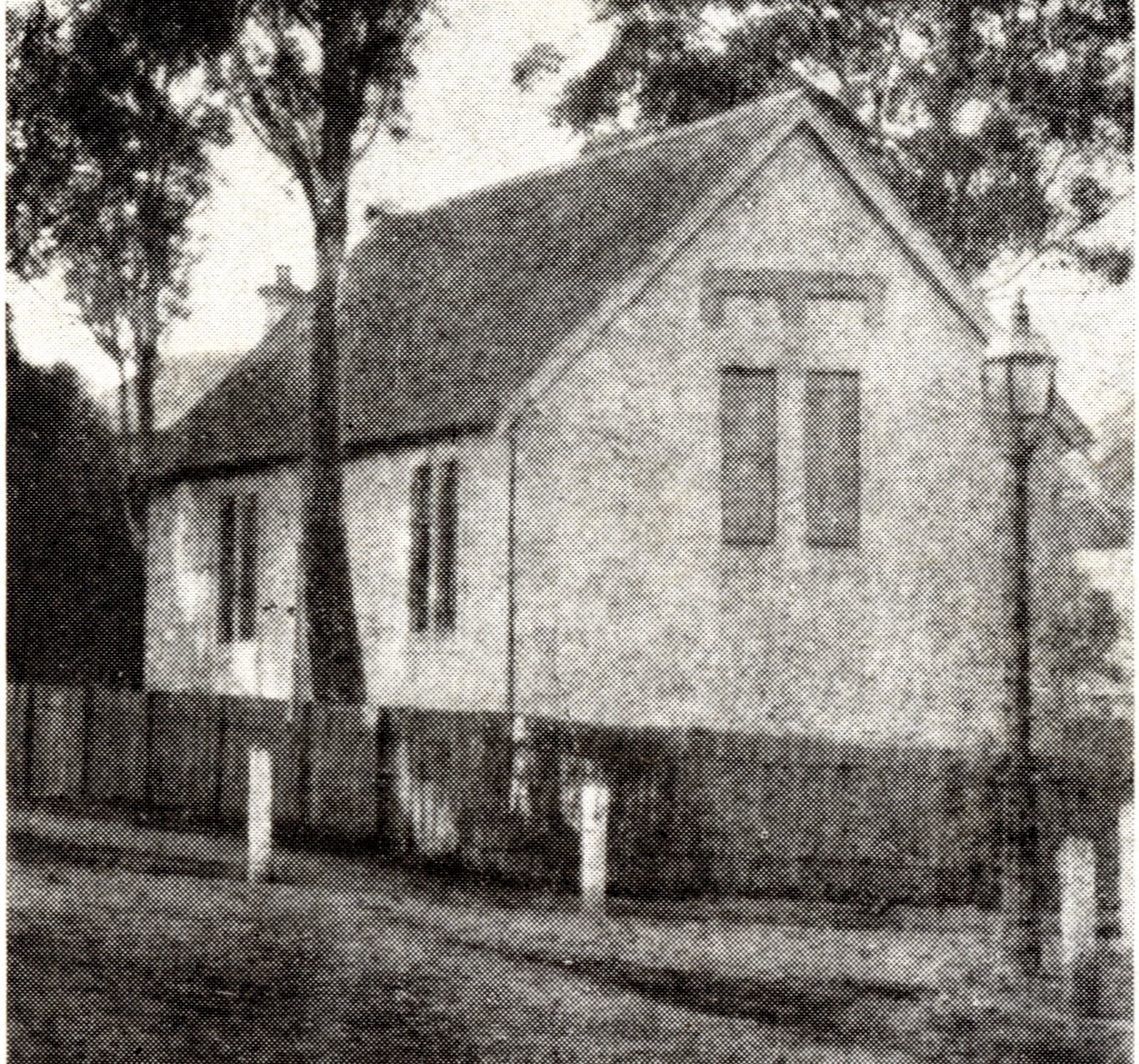
The school building established in the 1850s

In the mid-1850s St John's established a Church of England Denominational Day School in a small, plain white stone building near the corner of Charlotte and Bland St, However, when the Ashfield public school expanded in 1875, the church school proved unable to compete, and by 1880 it was closed. The building was sold to the newly begun Ashfield Boy's College in 1882, but was demolished in 1885.

Catholic education in the area flourished, and seeing this, J. C. Corlette wrote to England to Miss Ellen Clarke, suggesting that she start a school for young ladies in Ashfield. This went ahead, the school known as Normanhurst School began in a cottage in Bland Street. Although it was officially non-denominational, Normanhurst maintained strong links with St John's. The school grew, and moved premises to Orpington Street, but eventually closed down in 1941.

== Land and buildings ==
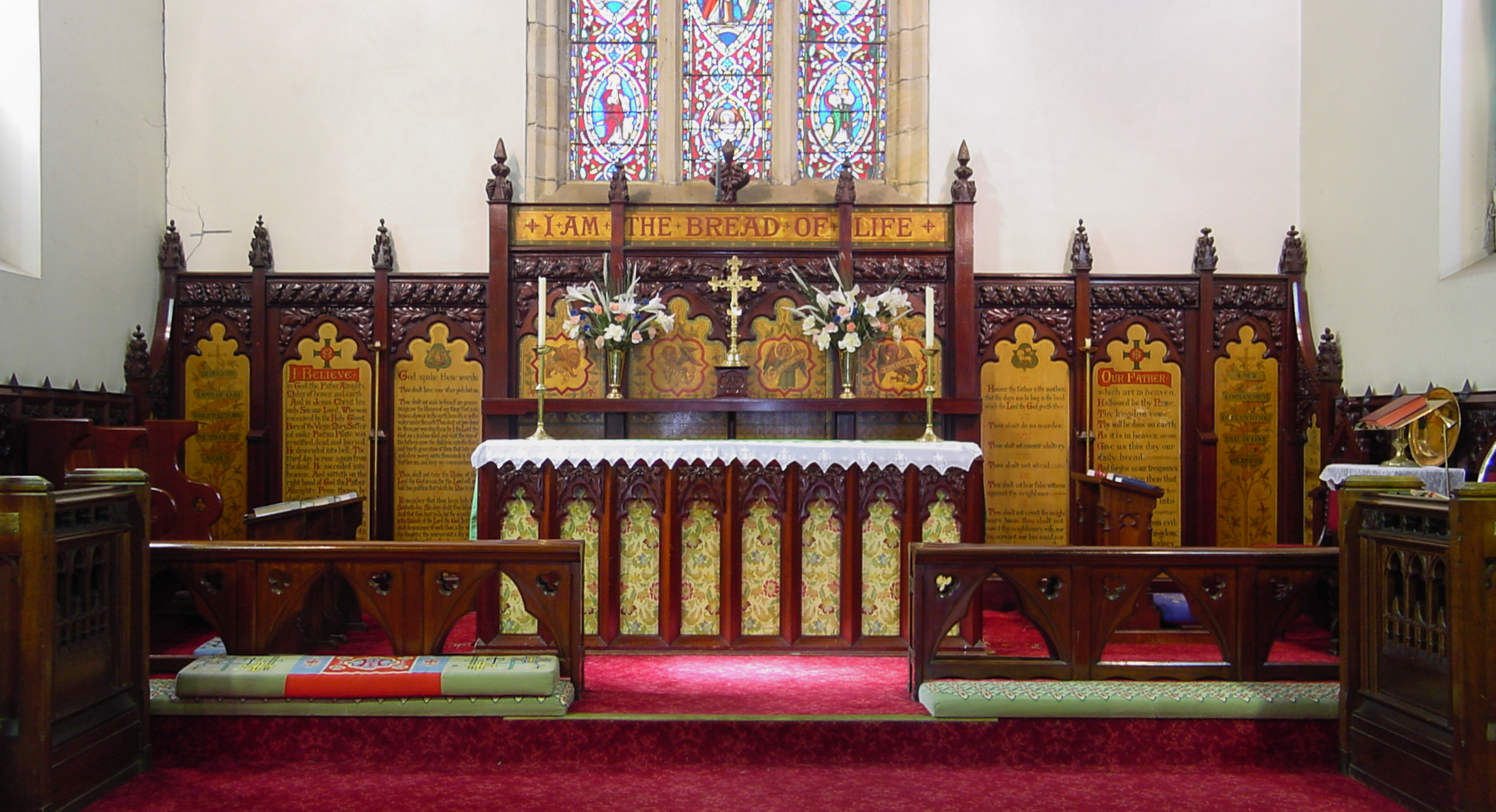
Chancel including the reredos hand-carved by Rev Wilkinson

=== Church ===
Having evolved over a long period, the church building displays elements of a range of styles including Colonial Gothic Picturesque, Victorian and Federation Free Gothic. The transepts and chancel are constructed from Sydney sandstone, whereas the nave and tower are rendered brick. The roofs are all slate.

The interior has been described as "architecturally much more satisfying than its exterior". It has a hammerbeam ceiling with a curved rafter roof with colonettes, plaster walls, and stained glass in every window from a range of periods. The reredos and pulpit are distinctive cedar carvings by the early rector F. Wilkinson.

=== Cemetery ===
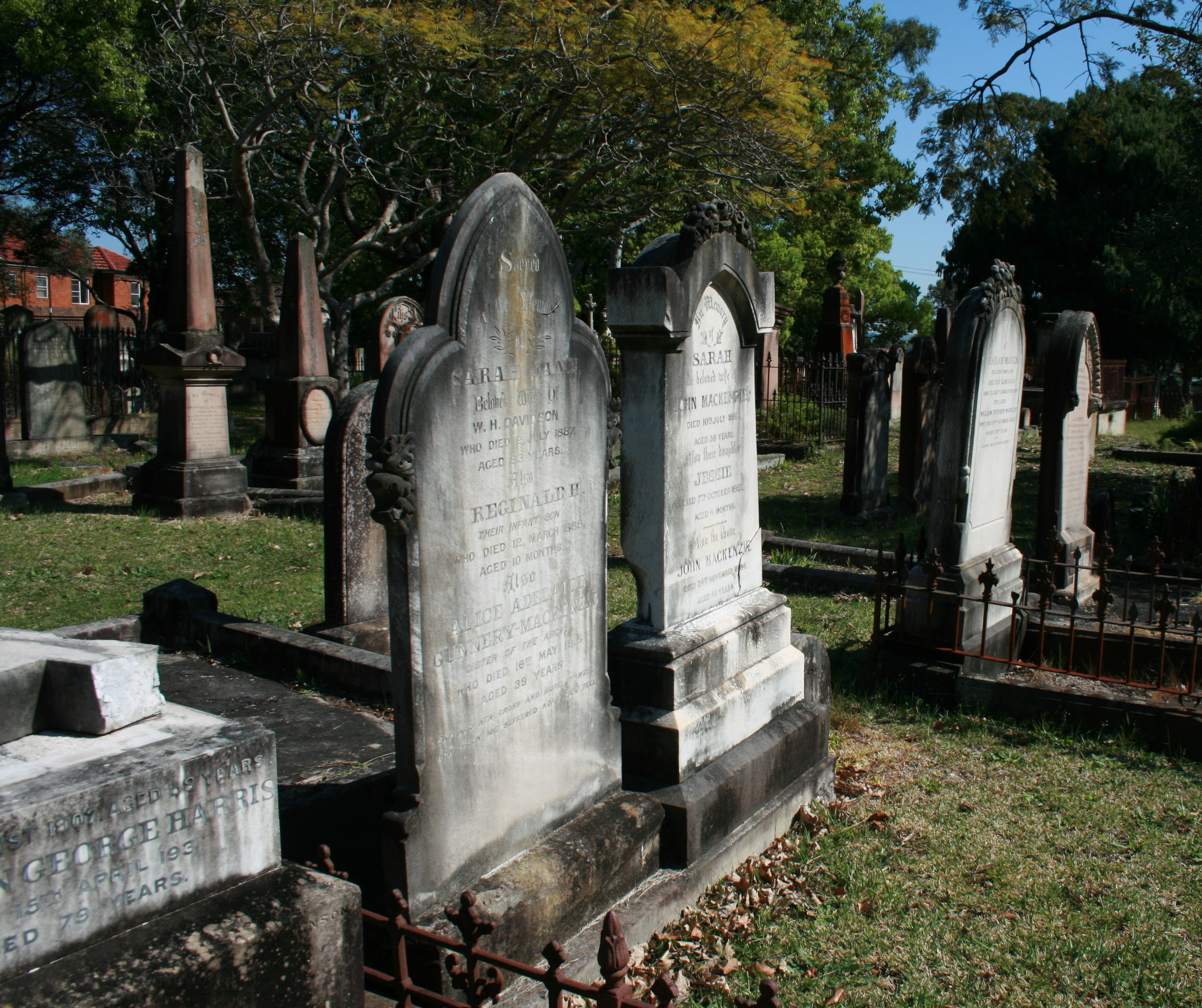
A section of the cemetery

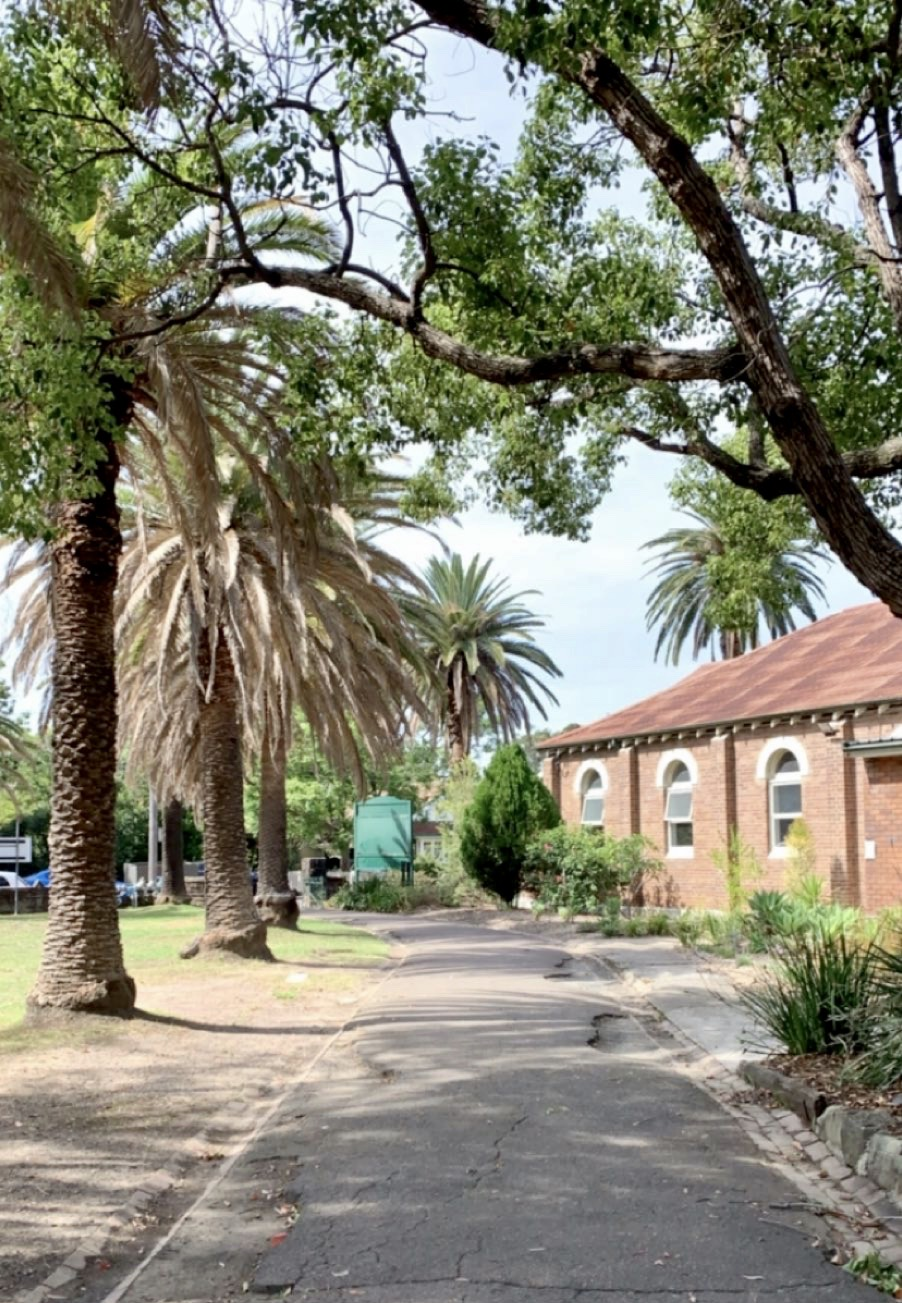
The Southern Entrance to the cemetery

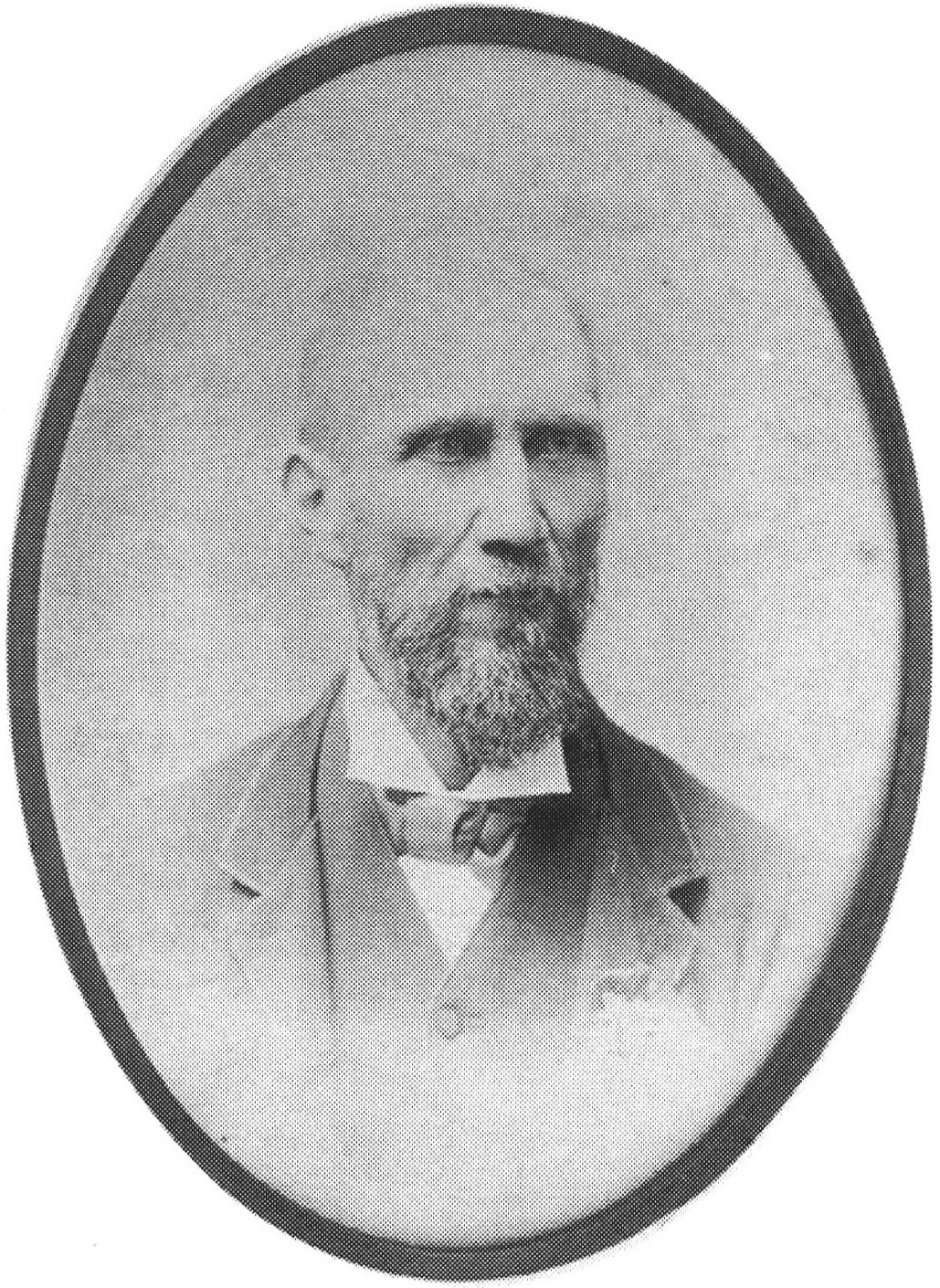
Charles Van Treight, an early sexton at St John's, responsible for the operations of the cemetery (Note: Van Treight's primary job was in sanitation and health at the Ashfield Municipal Council. He attended St John's for 45 out of 46 years in Ashfield, and sang in the choir for 30 of those. At his funeral, W. G. Hilliard told of his Christian faith, noting that he was "on his knees in prayer at his bedside when the Angel of the Lord called him".)

The cemetery is geographically aligned with the church, and takes up a large portion of the land area. The oldest graves are on the eastern side of the path, and typically face west. Newer graves on the western side of the path generally face east.

A number of notable former Ashfield residents are buried at St John's. First Fleet convict, John Limeburner/Linburner, had been transported for stealing clothing to the value of about one pound, eventually died in 1847 aged 104. His headstone was defaced by vandals in 1965. Several members of the Wilkinson and Underwood families were significant in the early European settlement of the Ashfield district. Louise Taplin (1855–1901) was matron of The Infants' Home Child and Family Services for 15 years until her death, and led the home through the 1890s depression, despite a shortage of salaried staff. Henry Halloran (1811–1893) was a poet and resident of Ashfield, and was married to Elizabeth Underwood's daughter Elizabeth. Thomas Walker, a banker and philanthropist who owned and developed Yaralla Estate, is in a family grave with his wife Jane, and daughter Eadith's ashes. Samuel Henry Terry, a wealthy landowner and politician is also buried at St Johns, having spent the last part of his life in an Ashfield residence named The Lilacs. Randolph John Want was a solicitor and member of the New South Wales Legislative Council. Edward Wrench was one of the founding partners of real estate agents Richardson & Wrench. Amy Schauer was a cookery instructor and author. The graveyard also contains members of the Taverner, Uhr and Rodd families, after whom the localities Taverner's Hill, Uhr's Point, and Rodd Point are named. There are also graves of three former rectors: T. H. Wilkinson, W. Lumsdaine, and J. C. Corlette, and members of their families, together with a pioneer clergyman, E. Rogers.

Beside these prominent figures, many of the St John's graves contain children. Typhoid and whooping cough epidemics took heavy tolls in the Victorian period. Although Ashfield was known as a healthy area, many families lost two or even three children.

Burial rates at St John's declined rapidly around the turn of the 20th century. The rector's notes from the time indicate that many funeral services conducted at the church now preceded burial at Rookwood Cemetery. Although the cemetery has never officially been closed, no burial plots have been sold for some years. A memorial garden for the interment of ashes was opened in the time of J. R. Seddon, providing a popular resting place for the Ashfield community.

Since the late 1970s day-release prisoners have assisted with maintenance of the cemetery grounds. In Australia's bicentennial year, 1988, a $16,000 grant was awarded for restoration work in the cemetery, at which time some broken gravestones were cemented together, and some illegible ones were 'cut back' and the letters repainted.

=== Annex ===
In 2017 an annex was added directly adjacent and connected to the western side of the church, to provide running water, kitchen and function facilities to the church. It is used mainly for kid's church and communal meals (primarily morning tea) after church services.

== Ministry ==
In 2008, the Parish of Ashfield (green), was amalgamated with that of Five Dock and Haberfield (blue), to form Christ Church Inner West.

Andrew Katay became the 18th rector in early 2005. In 2008 the church was part of an amalgamation with the parish of Five Dock and Haberfield, forming Christ Church Inner West Anglican Community (CCIW) with Andrew Katay continuing as the rector of the new parish. At the end of 2025, St Oswald's Haberfield was released to become an independent parish. There are currently two Sunday services at Ashfield, and one at Five Dock.

Since July 2006 it has run a mothers and children group, which discusses Christian parenting issues, and teaches English to those for whom it is not their native language.

In 2010 the church began an outdoor film festival showing ghost and horror movies in the historic cemetery.

== See also ==
- Australian non-residential architectural styles
- List of Anglican churches in the Diocese of Sydney
