= Joseph Underwood (merchant) =

Australian merchant and sealer

- Born: 1779
- Died: 1833 (aged 53–54)
- Citizenship: Australian
- Occupation: Merchant

Joseph Underwood (1779 - 30 August 1833) was an Australian merchant in the years following the Rum Rebellion. He arrived in New South Wales in 1807 on the back of sound references from the British Secretary of State and in 1810 presented himself to Major-General Lachlan Macquarie, Governor of New South Wales following the usurping of William Bligh earlier in the year, as an expert merchant. Macquarie commissioned Underwood to visit foreign markets and increase economic imports, starting with Calcutta, India where he imported spirits. By owning the ships privately, but mortgaged to a nominal owner, Underwood could evade taxes imposed by the East India Trading Company. His journeys took him to London, India and South Africa's Cape of Good Hope, where his ship was wrecked in 1812, during the period when Richard Siddins, employed by him, was the captain of the ship.

Moving into seal hunting, despite the decline of the industry, Underwood purchased a 186-ton vessel he sent sealing and whaling. He expanded his fleet, importing pork from Tahiti and cedar and coal from Hunter River, sold seal skin in China, and imported tea from Bengal. On the return journey from Bengal he came across a derelict, Seringapatam. The United States Navy had captured Seringapatam during the War of 1812, but mutineers and prisoners of war had recaptured her. Underwood acted as the crew's agent in claiming salvage from the Court of Vice-Admiralty at Sydney, but the court referred the matter to London. Macquarie eventually requested Captain Eber Bunker to sail Seringapatam to England, where she was returned to her owner. Underwood's other vessels continued to range across vast trading routes, reaching Batavia and Mauritius by the early 1820s.

By 1821 Underwood retired from personally undertaking these voyages. Instead, he purchased land in the City of Newcastle and Ashfield, New South Wales, to retire to. He also bought up various tracts of land and took up dairy farming. He was widowed in 1818, though with several children; his second wife, Elizabeth Underwood, survived him.
