= Elizabeth Underwood =

Australian pioneering land owner (1794–1858)

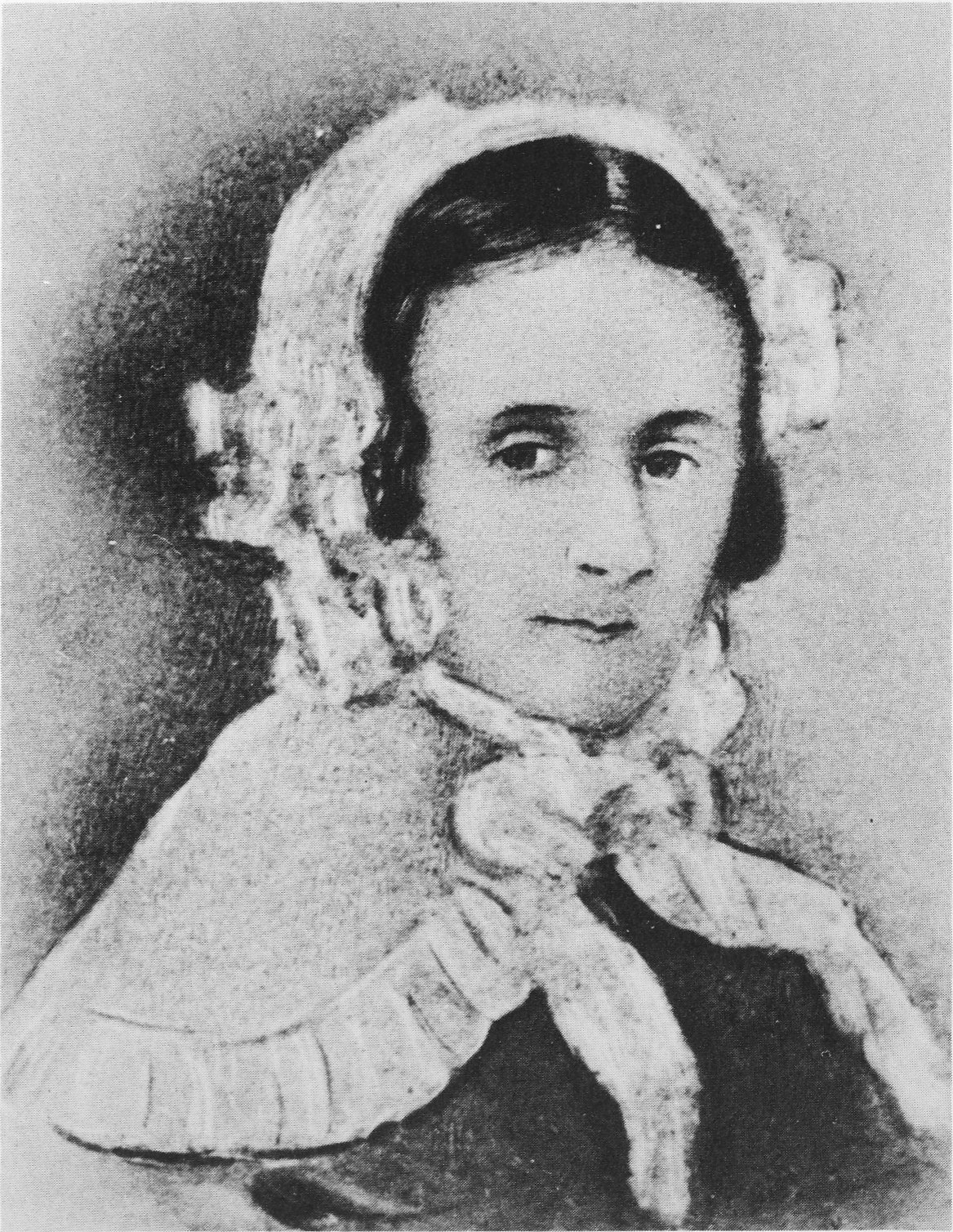
- Born: Elizabeth Harris; 1794; Norfolk Island, New South Wales, Australia
- Died: 31 August 1858 (aged 63–64); Ashfield, New South Wales
- Burial place: St John's, Ashfield
- Other name: Elizabeth Lang
- Spouses: Walter Lang (m. 1812; died 1816); Joseph Underwood (m. 1819; died 1833)

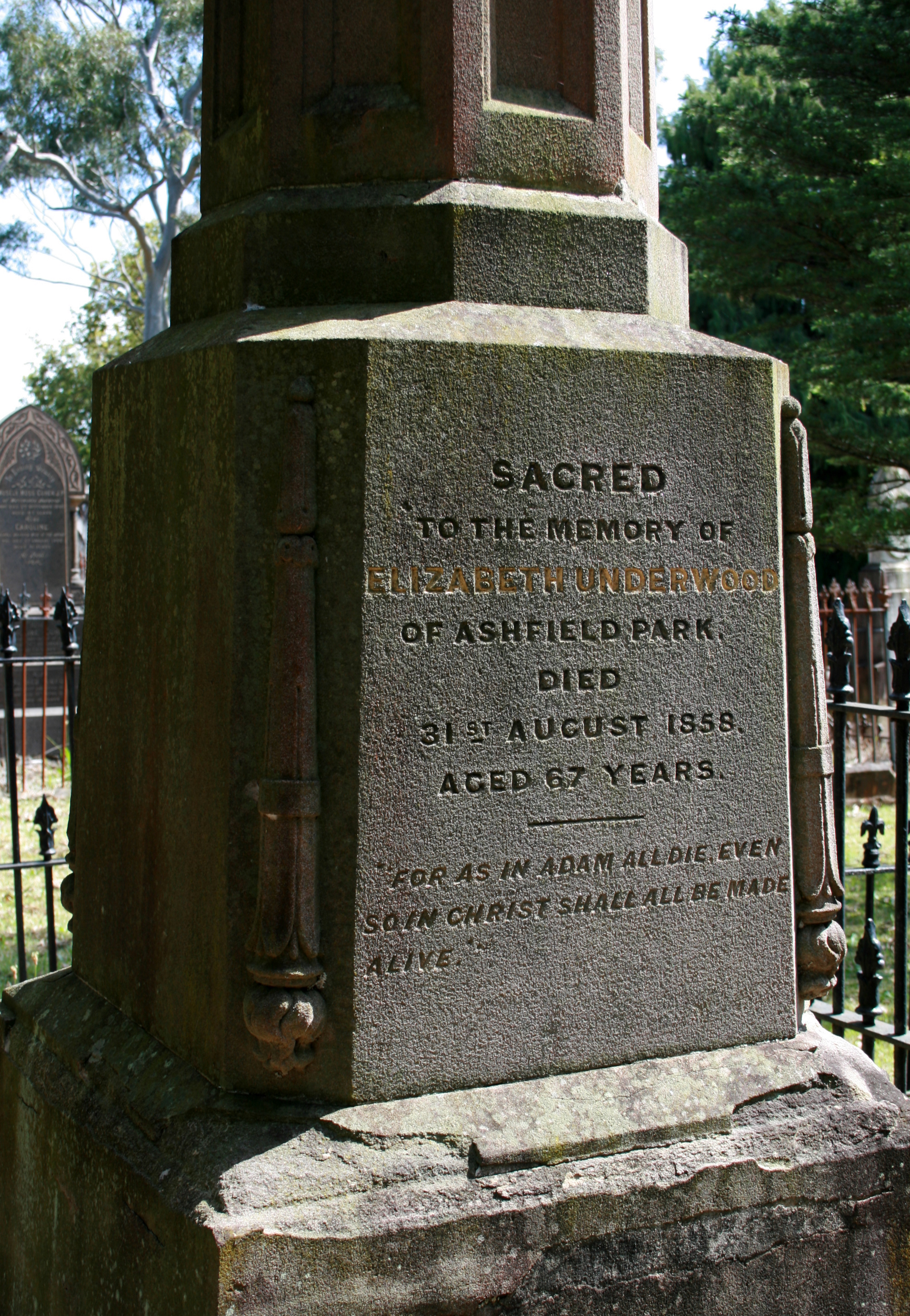
Elizabeth Underwood's gravestone in the cemetery at St John's Ashfield

Elizabeth Underwood (Harris, Lang) (1794 – 31 August 1858) in Norfolk Island, New South Wales, Australia, was a pioneering Australian land owner who founded the village (now a suburb) of Ashfield, New South Wales.

She was the daughter of John Harris, an English-born ex-convict who had been sentenced to death for stealing eight silver spoons but was ultimately transported to Australia on the First Fleet. Her mother's identity isn't known for sure but she was probably also a convict. One biographer speculates her name was Mary Green and Elizabeth was actually born Elizabeth Green on 24 December. Neither parent played a significant part in her upbringing. Her father set sail for England in 1801 and left Elizabeth and her sister Hannah in the care of James Larra, a prominent Sydney merchant and ex-convict, and his wife Susannah. Elizabeth was later described as the niece of Larra and it may be that her mother was sister to either Larra or his wife.

In 1812, she married wealthy Scottish merchant Walter Lang and they had two sons before Walter died in 1816. The second son John George Lang was the first published novelist born in Australia. In 1819, she married Joseph Underwood, a merchant and sealer whose wife had died the year before leaving him with a number of children to look after. Joseph and Elizabeth had a further six children of their own so it was fortunate that, just before his marriage to Elizabeth, he had bought a large house and property, Ashfield Park, from fellow merchant Robert Campbell.

After Joseph's death in 1833, the family began to encounter financial difficulties and considered subdividing their large estate. Cannily, Elizabeth advertised the sale as the formation of the village of Ashfield and paid for the construction of the Anglican Church herself. Many streets in northern Ashfield bear the names of her children including Frederick, Elizabeth, Charlotte, Julia and Joseph. Prior to the subdivision, the area was commonly known as Underwood's Bush and Underwood's Creek (later Iron Cove Creek and now a stormwater drain) was a popular picnic spot along Parramatta Road. Elizabeth died in 1858 and was buried by the rector Thomas Wilkinson in the graveyard of the church she built, St John's.
