= Richardson & Wrench =

Australian real estate company

- Industry: Real estate
- Founded: 1858
- Founder: Robert Richardson; Edward Wrench
- Headquarters: Sydney, Australia
- Number of locations: 100 (2016)
- Area served: New South Wales; Queensland
- Website: www.randw.com.au

Richardson & Wrench is an Australian real estate company. It was founded in 1858 by Robert Richardson and Edward Wrench in George Street, Sydney. In 1889, it was listed on the Australian Securities Exchange. It was taken over by Lendlease in December 1961 and delisted. In 1982, Lendlease sold the business to Neil Collins, who in turn sold it in 1988 to the Malaysian WTK Group.

As at 2016, Richardson & Wrench had 100 franchises in New South Wales and Queensland. It previously had offices in the Australian Capital Territory, Tasmania and Western Australia. In 2016, it was purchased by chief executive Andrew Cocks in a management buyout.
