= William Hilliard (bishop) =

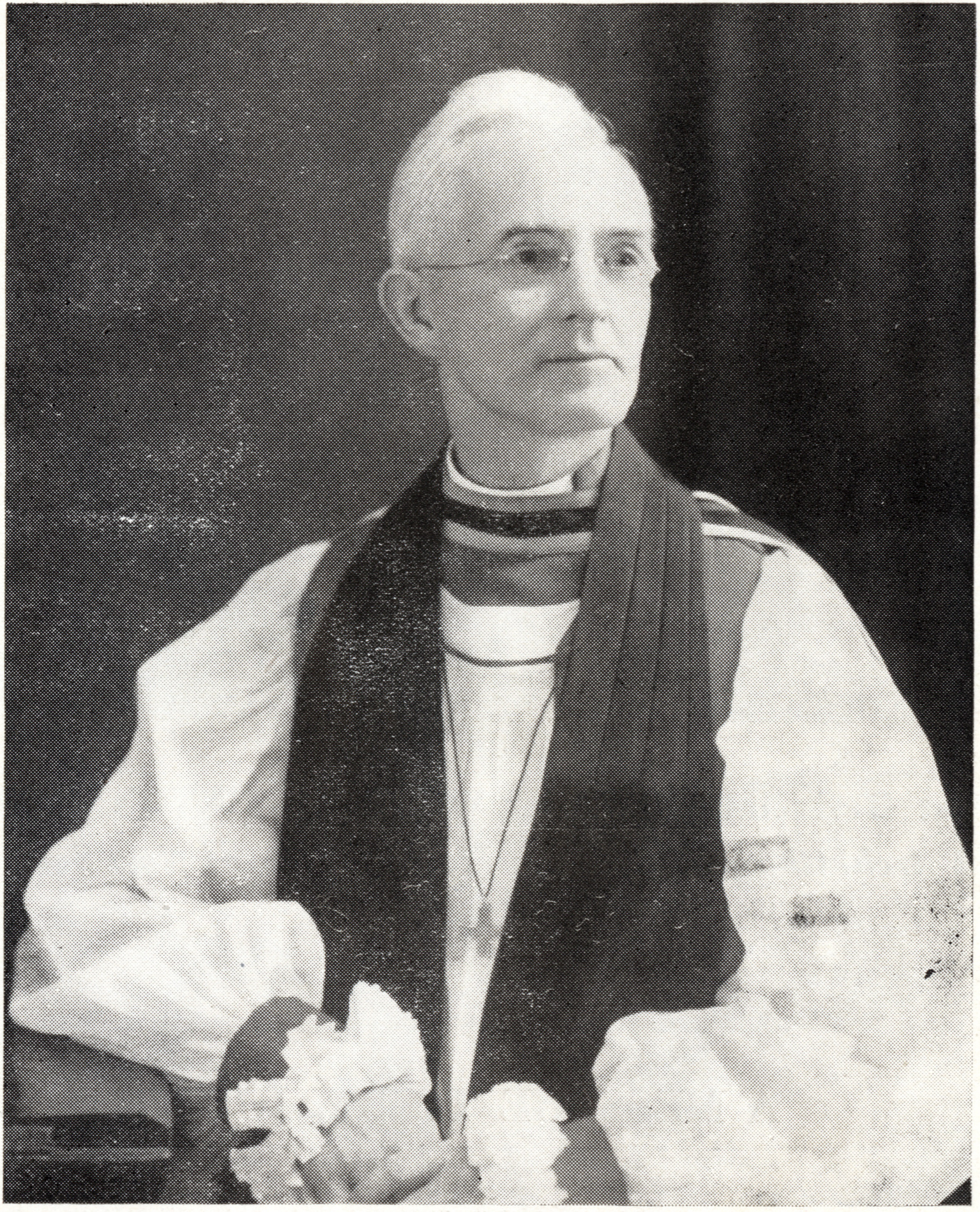
Hilliard in 1940

The Rt Rev William George Hilliard (29 May 1887 – 1 February 1960) was the 5th Anglican bishop of Nelson from 1934 to 1940.

== Career ==
Hilliard was born in Sydney on 29 May 1887, educated at the University of Sydney and ordained in 1912. He first worked as a curate at Dulwich Hill in Sydney. He was inducted as Rector of St John's Ashfield on 23 June 1916, and served there until 31 October 1926, when he accepted an appointment as Rector of St Clement's, Marrickville. From 1928 to 1934 he was Headmaster of Trinity Grammar School, Summer Hill, when he was elevated to the episcopate. He resigned his see in 1940 and became Rector of St John's, Parramatta, and Coadjutor Bishop of Sydney.

Hilliard had his own radio program on 2UW and appeared as a commentator on television.

== Personal life ==
Hilliard married Lilian Constance Pearl Wooster in 1914. She died in 1918, leaving their infant son. In 1927 he married Dorothy Kezia Duval; they had three daughters. A prominent Freemason, he died on 1 February 1960.

Hilliard's paternal grandfather was the New South Wales cricketer Harry Hilliard.

Anglican Communion titles
| Preceded by William Charles Sadlier | Bishop of Nelson; 1934–1940 | Succeeded by Percival William Stephenson |
