= Edward Wrench =

Australian businessman and auctioneer (1828–1893)

Edward Thomas Jones Wrench (1828–1893) was an Australian businessman and auctioneer. In 1860, he co-founded the wool merchant and real estate company Richardson & Wrench alongside his partner, Robert Richardson.

Wrench was born was born on 11 January 1828 in London, England to Edward and Anne Wrench. He married Mary Ann Smith on 25 January 1851. The following year, the couple moved to Sydney, Australia, where he gained employment at the Australian Joint Stock Bank. In 1860, he joined Robert Richardson to establish Richardson & Wrench.

Mary Ann died in 1876. On 3 June 1879, Wrench married Theresa Clementine Throckmorton (née Horne), a widow who had five children.

In 1886, Wrench acquired the entirety of the West Kingston estate, a subsection of the former Kingston Estate.

He died in Woollahra, New South Wales on 26 October 1893, and was buried at St John's Ashfield.

== See also ==
- Thomas Sutcliffe Mort
