= The Infants' Home Child and Family Services =

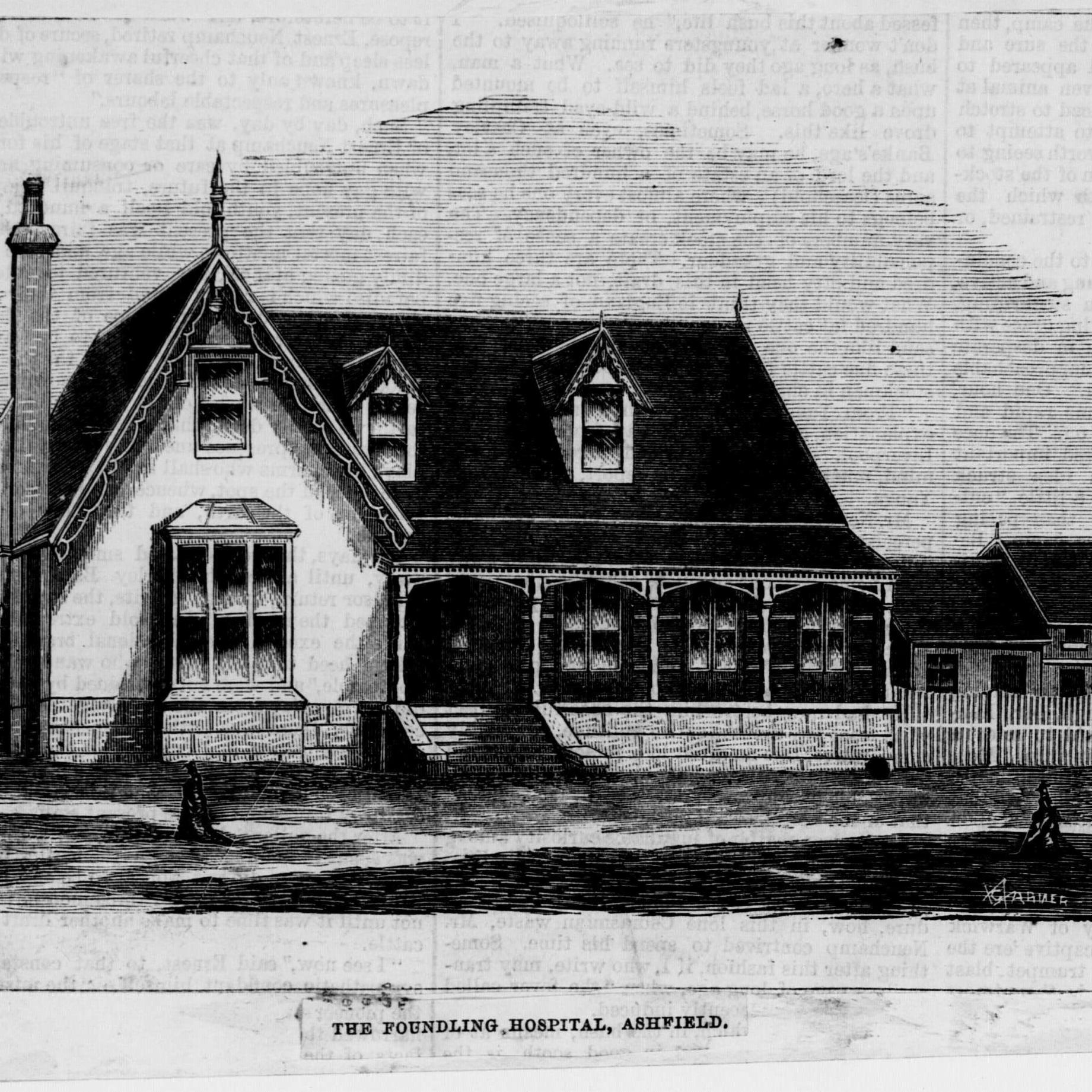

The Infants' Home Child and Family Services was established in Sydney, Australia in 1874 as a refuge for unwed mothers and their babies and evolving over time to a current provider of early childhood education and health services.

== Background ==
In 1873, there arose widespread public concern pertaining to recent examples of infanticide and child abandonment. On 23 July 1873, the Sydney Morning Herald, after proclaiming that 'Infanticide has now risen to an enormous and characteristic evil', concluded that 'there is no way to meet desertion, which commonly includes infanticide, whether or not intended, but by providing a Foundling Asylum'.

At the time the main institution for single mothers and their children in Sydney was the Benevolent Asylum, the Benevolent Society founded the Benevolent Asylum in 1821. Some of the women advocating for a new foundling hospital claimed that the Benevolent Asylum was not meeting the needs of single pregnant women. A Mrs EB Parnell raised concerns about the Benevolent Society's requirement for a woman to be interviewed by a committee (of men) before she could be admitted to the Asylum

Born from this public concern about 'forty ladies of Sydney' met to discuss how there existed a gap in the existing charitable institutions of Sydney to meet the 'special requirements of this child of immorality and distress – and hence, it might be inferred, the lamentable frequency of infanticide'

From this initial meeting The Sydney Foundling Institution was founded in May 1874 as a non-church affiliated refuge for abandoned babies and single mothers, run by a committee of women. This committee of women included the afore mentioned Mrs EB Parnell (President) Mrs Bensusan, Mrs. G.F Wise, Mrs E Deas Thomson, Lady Murray, Mrs Henry Moore, Mrs Fischer, Mrs Alexander, Mrs Holt, Mrs John Smith and Mrs St. John.

Challenging the approach taken by other institutions at the time whose charter was to separate mother and child, The Sydney Foundling Institution championed the notion than mothers and babies must be kept together in the first instance.

Its first location was on Victoria Street, Darlinghurst, The Foundling Institution was unique at the time for being governed entirely by women with reports of the Institution being 'well marshalled by the elite of Sydney female society'. The first abandoned baby left on the steps was named by the committee, Sydney Hope, named after the city he was born and for the hope he inspired. In the hospital, 15; left at the door, or in places continuous to the hospital, 14; admitted on the application of their mothers, 14, and admitted with their mothers, 12; total, 55. This number is disposed of as follows: Deaths, 24; adopted by well-to-do respectable childless couples, 3; left with their mothers, 9; and present in the institution on 1 June 1876, 21: total 55.

In October 1874, the institution changed its name to the Sydney Foundling Hospital and soon after, in 1875, moved to Stewart Street, Paddington. Over time it became apparent that the inner city location was not conducive an environment for healthy babies and restrictive in terms of space requirements. In 1877, the hospital was moved out of Paddington into new premises, following Thomas Walker donating a 4.5 acre property in Henry Street, Ashfield named Gorton. From then on the organisation was known as The Infants' Home.

== 1890s–1920s ==
One of the pressing concerns for The Infants' Home during the early years was the high mortality rate. During the first year, of the forty-five children admitted twenty-six deaths occurred, however over time with the improvements reaped from the rural life at the new location in Ashfield as well as the care taken by the new matron Louise Taplin the mortality rate dropped over time reaching nil for the first time in 1937.

Matron Louise Taplin is a pivotal figure during this time, at which her dedication is epitomised by building expansions, improvements to the health and sanitation and fundraising initiatives. Following her death in 1901, considered a great tragedy, she was buried at the nearby St John's Ashfield cemetery.

The First World War impacted The Infants' Home with an increase in one parent homes or an increase in children orphaned by the war, the continued need for The Infants' Home's services were integral. Change was also felt predominantly in a reflection in a changing of social mores at the time. Mothers did not stay at the Home as long as they once did, with many mothers going on to live with friends and relatives, where once these mothers were completely shunned.

In 1924, The Infants' Home successfully lobbied for incorporation through an Act of Parliament.

The Infants' Home, Ashfield Act 1924 (13/1924) has the full title 'An Act to incorporate the members of a society which conducts the Infants' Home, Ashfield; to promote the objects of the said society'. This Act made the Infants' Home, Ashfield a statutory corporation (a body specially set up by Parliament) with its land protected by law. This enabled The Infants' Home board to be able to sell any of the land and be able to use the profits to reinvest into the organisation as well as giving legitimacy and leverage for official negotiations.

== 1930s–1960s ==
A nursery school was opened by Dame Enid Lyons in 1936 providing stimulation for the children in residence, the first of its kind for children in Australian institutional care.

World War Two brought financial difficulties to the Home as well as record numbers of attendance with 1941 reporting 309 children being admitted to the Home

In the late 1940s it was agreed that the organisation would need to employ more nurses, maintenance staff and for the first time a social worker, an important indication of the changing nature of charities at this time from volunteers to paid professional workforce. The increased need for paid trained staff and the growing numbers of children in care put pressure on the capabilities of the Home and for the first time in the history of the organisation a mortgage was put on property, investments sold and a call for public support that of which would be integral lest the organisation have to be shut down. With the assistance of private donations and government subsidies The Infants Home continued its operations.

== 1960s–1990s ==
In 1965, The Infants' Home was adopted by the crew of HMAS Sydney in memory of the men who lost their lives on the Royal Australian Navy destroyer Voyager. The Voyager had supported The Infants' Home and when the ship tragically collided with HMAS Melbourne the men of the Sydney decided to continue this support.

In 1972, an overhaul of The Infants' Home operations took place in which the offering of residential care ceased with long daycare centres taking its place. Moving away from the institutionalised care that characterised it's nearly 100 years of operation to flexible care options for all families.

In 1974 the Australian Federal government introduced a family day scheme, whereby childcare would take place in private homes for small groups of children. The Infants' Home was one of the first organisations to offer family day care when they were invited to participate in the pilot scheme.

In 1977 The Women and Children's Stress Centre is established to support children and families at risk. This would soon become an important service for the local community with 3464 calls being made from distressed women in 1988.

== 1990s–present ==
In 1994, a new government childcare accreditation system was introduced and The Infants' Home was chosen to be one of 32 centres Australia wide to be involved in the pilot accreditation study.

1996 saw the closure of The Women and Children's Stress Centre, The Infants' Home women's refuge for mothers escaping domestic violence. The Presidents’ Report for the year reported the sadness of the closure but given the increase in government led programs in the area as well as the raised safety concerns for families and staff the closure was deemed inevitable.

The 1996 budget decision to withdraw operational subsidies from community based long day care impacted The Infants' Home, the staff and board agreed that's fees should not be raised out of concern for the financial situation of local families and from this tension came the introduction of sessional care was brought in to allow families flexibility in their childcare arrangements.

In 2013, The Infants' Home expanded with the addition of two new licensed childcare centres, increasing capacity to care for an extra 600 a year. The reopening ribbon cutting ceremony saw The Infants’ Home patron Nicholas Shehadie attend.

Today The Infants' Home provides long day care, family day care, postnatal services, playgroups and parenting workshops. Thirty per cent of onsite services are targeted to support children and families living with vulnerabilities or who have additional needs.

== Controversies ==
The early years of The Infants' Home posed a challenge with public backlash accusing The Infants' Home of condoning immoral behaviour.

In 1877, some members of the Legislative Assembly opposed money being given with one member claiming the institution was 'a premium for bastardy' and another objecting that it 'relieved the fathers of illegitimate children from their natural responsibilities'

== Patrons ==
The Infants' Home has been honoured over many years with the patronage of viceregal consorts of the Governor of New South Wales.

The first recorded instance of official viceregal consort patronage was after Mrs John Nortcott who during her time as patron became Lady Northcott in 1946 with the appointment of her husband Lieutenant General Sir John Northcott to the position of Governor of New South Wales. She served as patron until the retirement of her husband in 1957.

Amy Woodward, wife of Lieutenant General Sir Eric Woodward served as patron between the years of 1957–1965.

Lady Cutler, wife of Sir Roden Cutler served as patron between the years of 1966–1981. Both of them took a keen interest in The Infants’ Home with Sir Cutler and Lady Cutler opening a new day care centre in 1972.

Lady Rowland, wife of Air Marshall Sir James Gowland served between the years of 1981–1989.

Lady Suzanne Martin, wife of Rear Admiral Sir David James Martin served between the years of 1989–1990.

Lady Shirley Sinclair, wife of Rear Admiral Peter Sinclair served between the years of 1990–1996.

Jacqueline Samuels, wife of Hon. Gordon Samuels served between the years of 1996–2001.

Sir Nicholas Shehadie, husband of Dame Marie Bashir served between the years of 2001–2014 in which he was very active in his contributions including the opening of new childcare centres in August 2013.

Linda Hurley, Wife of his Excellency general the Honourable David Hurley AC DSC (retd) Governor-General of the Commonwealth of Australia has served since 2014 and is one of the current patron of The Infants’ Home. Linda and General David Hurley were present during the grand reopening of one of the recently renovated childcare centres Rigby House in 2018.

Dennis Wilson, husband of her Excellency the Honourable Margaret Beazley AO QC 2019-

== Notable persons ==
Mary Elizabeth Windeyer, served on the board from 1878 to 1897 was an Australian women's rights campaigner, particularly in relation to women's suffrage in New South Wales, a philanthropist and charity organizer.

Anne-Marie Deas Thomson a founding committee member, was wife of Edward Deas Thomson whom was an Australian administrator, politician and chancellor of the University of Sydney.

Thomas Walker, Benefactor was a New South Wales colonial politician, merchant banker and philanthropist. At the time of his death, he was one of the wealthiest and most influential colonialists in New South Wales.

Agnes Murray a founding member, cousin of W. S. Gilbert of the celebrated Gilbert and Sullivan musical partnership and wife of Sir Terence Aubrey Murray, an Australian pastoralist, parliamentarian and knight of the realm of Irish birth. He had the double distinction of being, at separate times, both the Speaker of the New South Wales Legislative Assembly and the President of the New South Wales Legislative Council.
