= Harry Hilliard (cricketer) =

Australian cricketer

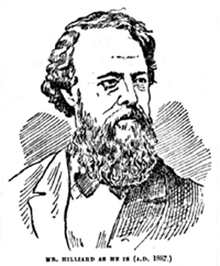
- Harry Hilliard in 1887

Personal information
- Full name: Henry Hilliard
- Born: 7 November 1826; Sydney, New South Wales, Australia
- Died: 19 March 1914 (aged 87); Willoughby, New South Wales
- Batting: Right-handed
- Bowling: Right-arm fast underarm
- Role: Batsman
- Relatives: William Hilliard (grandson)

Domestic team information
- Years: Team
- 1855–56 to 1859–60: New South Wales

Career statistics
Competition	First-class
Matches	5
Runs scored	42
Batting average	4.66
100s/50s	0/0
Top score	20
Balls bowled	56
Wickets	2
Bowling average	13.50
5 wickets in innings	0
10 wickets in match	0
Best bowling	2/27
Catches/stumpings	4/1
- Source: Cricket Archive, 4 July 2016

Henry Hilliard (7 November 1826 – 19 March 1914) was an Australian cricketer. He played in New South Wales' first match, in 1856, against Victoria, and was the last surviving player from either side.

== Life and career ==
Harry Hilliard played in Sydney when he was 12 for the Union Club against the Military. On one occasion in his youth he was jailed for two days for absconding from his cabinet-making apprenticeship in order to play cricket.

A batsman and good fielder who occasionally kept wicket and bowled, Hilliard played in New South Wales' first match, in 1855–56, against Victoria, and in the next four of what became an annual match. His highest score was 20, against Victoria in 1856–57, the fourth-highest score in a low-scoring match. He and William Gilbert Rees, W. G. Grace's cousin, added 32 for the second wicket in New South Wales' first innings, the highest partnership of the match. He top-scored for New South Wales in his last match, scoring 15 in the first innings of a match in which New South Wales made 44 and 42 and Victoria won easily. New South Wales' highest total in these five matches was 86.

A stroke a few months after his last match in 1860 ended Hilliard's playing career. He was unable to walk for some time afterwards, but by swimming daily he gradually recovered. He kept up his daily swim for 40 years.

Hilliard and his wife had a large family. After his stroke, a benefit concert was held for them at the Prince of Wales Theatre in Sydney.

He remained a keen spectator of interstate cricket for the rest of his life, never missing a match, in Sydney or Melbourne, between New South Wales and Victoria. He also followed the Australians on their tour of England in 1878.

Hilliard spent most of his working life as a maker and repairer of cricket bats. He was the last surviving player from the first match between New South Wales and Victoria.
