= List of Shore Old Boys =

This is a list of former students of the Anglican Church school, the Sydney Church of England Grammar School (also known as Shore School) in North Sydney, New South Wales, Australia.

== Rhodes Scholars ==
- 1909 – Howard Bullock
- 1920 – Vernon Haddon Treatt
- 1935 – Keith Noel Everal Bradfield
- 1937 – Ian George Esplin
- 1940 – Basil Holmes Travers
- 1941 – Eric Brian Jeffcoat Smith
- 1946 – William Winslow Woodward
- 1948 – Louis Walter Davies
- 1952 – Frederick Rawdon Dalrymple
- 1960 – Malcolm John Swinburn
- 1964 – John Dyson Heydon
- 1971 – Richard John Lee
- 1973 – Ian Alfred Pollard
- 1975 – Peter Edward King
- 1982 – Graham Ross Dallas Jones
- 1995 – Evan Denis Fountain

== Academia ==
- Vere Gordon Childe – Archeologist at the University of Edinburgh and Institute of Archaeology
- Laurie Fitzhardinge – Historian and Librarian
- John Conrad Jaeger – Mathematician and physicist; chair geophysics at the Australian National University (1951), Elected Fellow of the Royal Society and has an Award (The Jaeger Medal awarded annually by the Australian Academy of Science) named in his honour
- Richard Makinson – Noted physicist and Communist
- Professor Sir Brian Windeyer (1904–1994) – Professor of Therapeutic Radiology; Dean at Middlesex Hospital Medical School, University of London 1942–69; Vice-Chancellor of the University of London 1969–72
- Phillip Wright – former Chancellor of the University of New England (1960–1970)

== Education ==
- Evan Mander-Jones – representative of Australia to the United Nations Educational, Scientific and Cultural Organization's biennial conference in Paris in 1952, Leading Pioneer of technical schools
- Harold Lusk – former Headmaster of King's College, Auckland
- Basil Holmes Travers – former Headmaster of Shore and Cricketer

== Medicine ==
- Ian Constable – Founder of the Lions Eye Institute
- Sir Lorimer Dods LVO – founder of the Children's Medical Research Institute
- Professor Anthony Gill AM – researcher, doctor, author
- Maurice Sando – anaesthetist
- Leslie St Vincent Welch – Chief Medical Officer of the Queensland Department of Public Instruction, visited rural schools to aid with an eye disease (sandy blight) that infected 20% of all pupils in the communities

== Science and engineering ==
- Bill Bradfield – Noted civil engineer
- Philip Cox AO – architect
- Robert Hickson – former Head Architect for the Bank of New South Wales and designed parts of The Armidale School and New England Girls School
- James Roy Kinghorn – naturalist and broadcaster

== Industry ==
=== Finance and banking ===
- James Ashton – former CEO and Chairmen of MLC (1963–1969) and board member on the Commonwealth Bank
- Sir John Cadwallader – former President of the Bank of New South Wales
- Robert Hamilton – founder of Mirvac
- Michael Hawker AM – former CEO of IAG, Former board member of Macquarie Group, and board member of Westpac
- Sir Norman Kater – Former Chairman of the Commercial Banking Company (1966–1978) and Colonel Sugar Refinery (1976–1978)
- Richard Lee – former CEO of Rothschild Australia (2001) and Rhodes Scholar (1971)
- John Marks – Founder of Development Finance Co. Ltd, an investment bank later purchased by ANZ Bank and Lendlease
- Hamish McLennan – Current Chairman of REA Group, former CEO of Network Ten, former Chairman of Rugby Australia
- Jack Massie – Tobacco Manufacturer and managing director of Commercial Banking Company of Sydney, Also a former Cricketer
- Leslie Melville – Noted central banking pioneer and economist, and former vice chancellor of the Australian National University
- Jack Minnett – co-founder of Ord Minnett
- Sir John Grant Phillips – former Governor of the Reserve Bank of Australia (1968–1975)
- Thomas Alfred Playfair – Former Chairman of Perpetual Trustees the and National Bank of Australasia, as well as being a founding member of the United Australia Party
- John Sands – Created the Renal Medicine Unit in the Royal Prince Alfred Hospital, founder of John Sands Holdings and was a board member and director of the Bank of New South Wales
- Alastair Urquhart – chairman of the Sydney stock exchange (later to be known as the Australian Securities Exchange) from 1959 to 1966
- Ross Du Vernet - Group Chief Executive Officer & Managing Director of ASX listed property and infrastructure manager Dexus
- Tom Waterhouse – CIO of Waterhouse VC, co-founder of ListedReserve.com and a member of the Waterhouse family of gambling fame

=== Media and advertising ===
- Frank Packer – media proprietor, founder of TCN that would later become the Nine Network
- Thomas Wallace – former advertising executive, CEO of Lintas prior to merger, and CEO of SSC&B-Lintas Australia also lead Australian Government Advertising Advisory Council, and latter helped form the Association of National Advertisers and the Media Council of Australia
- James Warburton – current CEO of Supercars, former CEO of Seven West Media

=== Retail and services ===
- Harold Christmas – founder of Woolworths
- Roger Corbett – board member of Reserve Bank of Australia (for a term of five years, from 2 December 2005); board member of Wal-Mart (2006–); CEO of Woolworths (1999–2006)
- Horace Ireland – former wholesale meat seller and solicitor
- Norman Nock – former director of David Jones and Lord Mayor of Sydney
- Jim Penman – founder of Jim's Group and historian.

=== Other ===
- Colin Bell – Noted grazier
- Andrew Mills – Noted grazier
- Bill Pulver – Former CEO of Australian Rugby Union
- Geoffrey Remington – Former chairman of Rolls-Royce Australia

== Entertainment, media, and the arts ==
- Peter Berner – comedian
- Russell Braddon – author of Naked Island
- Terence Clarke AM – composer, director, teacher
- Thomas Cocquerel – actor
- John Edwards – Producer
- Errol Flynn – legendary Hollywood actor known for swashbuckling roles
- Tim Freedman – musician, lead singer and songwriter for The Whitlams
- Frank Hinder – artist
- Eric Campbell – ABC foreign correspondent, author of 'Absurdistan', 'Silly Isles'
- Geoffrey Lehmann – poet, children's writer, lawyer
- David Marr – author, broadcast journalist, and columnist
- Morgan Mellish – award-winning Australian Financial Review journalist, killed in the Garuda Indonesia Flight 200 air accident in 2007
- Jim Moginie – musician with Midnight Oil
- Alan Osbiston - British Film Editor
- Garry Shead – artist
- Kenneth Slessor – poet and journalist
- Quentin Spedding – former lead editor of Labor Daily
- Daniel Lo Surdo - The Sydney Morning Herald reporter, author of ‘Growing Up in Sydney’
- Tim Storrier AM – artist
- Chris Taylor – member of The Chaser team and playwright
- John Wood – actor
- Sons of the East – Australian indie folk band

== Politics, public service, and the law ==
=== Lawyers and judges ===
- Sir Adrian Curlewis – former Judge in the NSW Supreme Court and founding member of Palm Beach Surf Club
- Justice John Dyson Heydon AC, QC – former Judge of the High Court of Australia
- Richard Gee – former family court judge, victim of family court bombings
- Justice Peter Graham - Former Federal Court Judge
- Frank Louat – Former High Court Lawyer
- Sir Alan Mansfield – former Governor of Queensland and former Chief Justice of the Queensland Supreme Court
- Justice Sir William Owen KBE, QC – former Judge on the High Court of Australia (1957), and Chaired the Royal Commission on Espionage (1954–1955)
- Chester Porter – Prominent barrister and second youngest person admitted to the NSW bar
- Justice Sir Dudley Williams KBE, MC, QC – former Judge on the High Court of Australia (1940–1958)
- Gordon John Ford Yuill – inaugural member of the Family Court of Australia, awarded a United Nations Human Rights fellowship as well as having the Yuill scholarship at the Australian National University named after him
- Peter Young AO – former Chief Judge in Equity of the New South Wales Supreme Court

=== Public servants ===
- John Wilson Crawford – noted Brigadier and recipient of the Distinguished Service Order
- Claude Ewen Cameron – Recipient of the Military Cross
- Gother Clarke – War doctor, Cricketer
- James Henderson – Distinguished Air force Officer and recipient of the Distinguished Service Order
- Alexander Wilkinson – Recipient of the Military Cross (also attended Eton)

=== Politicians ===
- David Arblaster – former Minister for Culture, Sport and Recreation and Minister for Tourism (1976) and Member for Mosman (1972–1984), representing the Liberals
- John Booth – former Member for Wakehurst (1984–1991), representing the Liberals
- Vivian Gordon Bowden – public servant and diplomat
- Sir Harold Leslie Boyce – former Lord Mayor of London
- John Cockle – former Member for Warringah (1961–1966)
- Keith Doyle - former Member for Vaucluse
- Sir John Gorton AC, GCMG, CH – politician and Prime Minister of Australia, representing the Liberals (also attended Geelong Grammar School)
- Eric Fairweather Harrison – former Member for Deakin and soldier during the First World War
- Gordon Freeth – former Foreign Minister, former Member for Forrest, former High Commissioner to the United Kingdom
- Peter King – former Member for Wentworth
- Michael MacKellar – former Member for Warringah
- Thomas McKay – member of the New South Wales Legislative Council and chairman of committees
- Stuart St. Clair – former Member for New England (1998–2001), representing the Nationals
- Rob Stokes – Former New South Wales Minister for Infrastructure, the Minister for Cities, and the Minister for Active Transport, and the Member for Pittwater
- Sir Vernon Treatt KBE, MM, QC – Minister for Justice (1938–1941), Leader of the Opposition (1946–1952), and Member for Woollahra, representing the Liberals

== Religion ==
- Cecil Abel – Missionary, educator and author of the preamble to the Papua New Guinean Constitution
- Stephen Bradley – Bishop of the Church of England in South Africa
- Anthony Grigor-Scott – Minister of the antisemitic "Bible Believers Church", formerly in Sydney, New South Wales, Australia.
- Donald Cameron – Bishop of North Sydney
- Geoffrey Cranswick – Anglican bishop
- Glenn Davies – Archbishop of Sydney
- Hamish Jamieson – Bishop of Carpentaria
- Donald Robinson AO – former Archbishop of Sydney

== Sport ==
=== Australian rules football ===
- Henry Playfair – Former AFL player at Geelong Football Club and Sydney Swans
- Lewis Roberts-Thomson – Former AFL player, dual AFL Premiership winner (2005, 2012) and Hall of Fame inductee at Sydney Swans
- Sam Wicks – Current AFL player at Sydney Swans
- Will Edwards – Current VFL player at Sydney Swans

=== Cricket ===
- Phil Emery – Australian test cricketer
- Jack Gregory – Australian test cricketer
- Leslie Minnett – Australian test cricketer
- Roy Minnett – Australian test cricketer
- Rupert Minnett – Australian test cricketer
- Bob Radford – Australian cricket administrator
- Dr Claude Tozer DSO – cricketer

=== Rowing ===
- Nick Baxter – Olympic rower
- Peter Dickson – Olympic rower
- John Hudson – Olympic rower
- Jackson Kench – Australian rowing rower
- Tobias Lister – Australian rowing team
- Brian Lloyd – English Olympic rower
- Alexander Lloyd – Olympic rower
- Hamish Playfair – Australian rowing team
- Nick Purnell – Australian rowing team
- Alexander Purnell – Australian rowing team- Gold Medallist Tokyo 2020 – Men's Coxless 4
- Chris Stevens – Olympic Rower
- William Godfrey Thomas – Bow N.S.W. Crew 1936 Kings Cup (1st), Silver Medal Australian Eight-Oared crew 1938 British Empire Games, coached the 1949 Kings Cup winning crew and was Shore G.P.S. coach 1951
- Roland Waddington – Olympic rower
- Barclay Wade – Commonwealth and Olympic Games rower
- William Woodward – English Olympic Rower

=== Rugby Union ===
- Al Baxter – Former Wallabies representative and Super Rugby player at NSW Waratahs
- Owen Crossman – Former Wallabies representative
- David Codey – former Wallabies captain
- David Dix – Former Wallabies representative
- Angus Gardner – Australian Rugby Union referee
- Garrick Fay – former Wallaby and Captain of the World XV side in 1977
- Mike Hercus – United States national rugby union team
- Mick Mathers – Former Wallabies representative
- Justin Sampson – sports television personality, professional speaker, former Australian rugby union player
- Haig Sare – Former Super Rugby player at Western Force
- Andrew Smith – Former Super Rugby player at ACT Brumbies
- Phil Waugh – CEO of Rugby Australia, former Wallabies captain and Super Rugby player at NSW Waratahs.
- Hugh Sinclair – Former Super Rugby player and captain at NSW Waratahs

=== Tennis ===
- James Duckworth – Australian tennis player
- John Newcombe – tennis player, two-time US Open and three-time Wimbledon champion
- Eric Pockley – Australian tennis player, among the first dozen pupils

=== Other ===
- Glenn Bourke – Olympic Sailor
- Brian Cobcroft – Olympic Equestrian athlete
- Ben Tudhope – snowboarder and Olympic Bronze medallist
- Alex Watson – pentathlete

== Other ==
- Michael 'Tarzan' Fomenko – ocean rower and hermetic bushman

== See also ==
- List of non-government schools in New South Wales
- List of boarding schools
- Athletic Association of the Great Public Schools of New South Wales
