= Justin Sampson =

Australian rugby union player

Justin "Sambo" Sampson
- Born: Justin R. Sampson; 2 September 1966 (age 60) Mudgee, New South Wales, Australia
- School: Shore School
- University: Mitchell College Bathurst
- Occupations: Rugby commentator; television personality; emcee; celebrity acutioneer

Rugby union career
- Position: Forward
Youth career
- 1979-1985: Shore School
Senior career
Years	Team	Apps	(Points)
1987	Bathurst Bulldogs		
1990–1993	Northern Suburbs		
1993–1996	Kubota Spears		
International career
Years	Team	Apps	(Points)
1988–1989	NSW Country		
1991-1992	North Harbour		
Coaching career
- Years: Team
- 1993–1996: Kubota Spears
- 1996–2000: Singapore
- 2002: Singapore
- 2007–2009: Indonesia
- 2022-Current: Young Yabbies

Justin "Sambo" Sampson (born 2 September 1966) is an Australian sports television personality, professional speaker and former rugby union player. Sampson has played representative rugby with New South Wales Country and North Harbour. He was an accomplished rugby coach, having coached the Singapore and the Indonesian national teams and has traveled worldwide conducting coaching clinics, fundraising activities and other events to help promote the sport of rugby. He is also a rugby commentator and presenter covering international matches on networks such as ESPN Star Sports and ABC TV (Australia).

== Early life and education ==
Sampson grew up on a sheep and cattle station near the town of Cobar, in western New South Wales, and attended the Shore School in Sydney. As a team captain, Sampson's style and leadership qualities earned him selections as vice-captain on both the Combined G.P.S. and the NSW Schoolboys First XV representative sides in 1985. After secondary school, Sampson went on to graduate from Mitchell College Bathurst in 1989.

== Rugby career ==
=== Playing career ===
Sampson played provincial representative rugby for Country Origin, North Harbour in Sydney (1991–92), as well New South Wales Country, where he played against the All Blacks in 1988 and British Lions in 1989. He was also captain of his 1st Division club, Northern Suburbs in Sydney for three years from 1990 to 1993. In 1990 Sampson was a runner up in The Sydney Morning Herald Best and Fairest Award, as well as runner up for the Rothmans Medal in 1991.

=== Coaching career ===
From 1993 to 1996 Sampson lived in Japan and played professional rugby with the Kubota Spears in Tokyo as well as serving as their coach. Sampson began assistant coaching duties with the Singapore national rugby team in 1996. He was later appointed to head coach, with Australia's David Campese taking over as assistant coach in 1998. He remained with Singapore until 2000 and returned again to coach in 2002.

In 2007, Sampson was signed to the coaching staff for the Indonesian national rugby team. Serving alongside former Wallaby Duncan Hall, Jr. and Singapore's Ismail Kadir. With Sampson part of the coaching staff, Indonesia went 4–2 in international test matches earning them a promotion to Division 3 for the 2009 Asian Five Nations.

== Professional career ==
Since 1997, Sampson has commentated for the World Rugby Sevens Series in Dubai, Hong Kong, Singapore and Malaysia. Furthermore, Sampson has commentated for ABC TV (Australia), along with RTHK Radio for the Hong Kong Sevens. In addition, Sampson was the main presenter for the Victoria Rugby Union's new weekly club rugby show on Channel 31 (Australia), called Rugby Time. Sampson has also written articles for The New Paper in Singapore, and for espnstar.com.

Sampson first appeared on ESPN Star Sports during the 1999 Rugby World Cup, as an expert rugby commentator and presenter, including Super Rugby, Six Nations Championship, Tri-Nations and Rugby World Cup tournaments. Sampson was part of a weekly panel of commentators for The Rugby Show and also served as Director of Advertising and Sales for Southeast Asia. He continued to commentate with Star Sports until 2007.

In 2006, Sampson established Sampson Marketing Services, a company that provides support on sponsorship, event management and corporate hospitality. Sampson is a prominent speaker, master of ceremonies and celebrity auctioneer and works with a variety of global and local organizations throughout Asia, Australia and the Middle East.

As one of the more recognized rugby pundits, Sampson travels to promote the sport of rugby by conducting coaching clinics, fundraising activities and other events for local and national Rugby Unions.
