= Graythwaite =

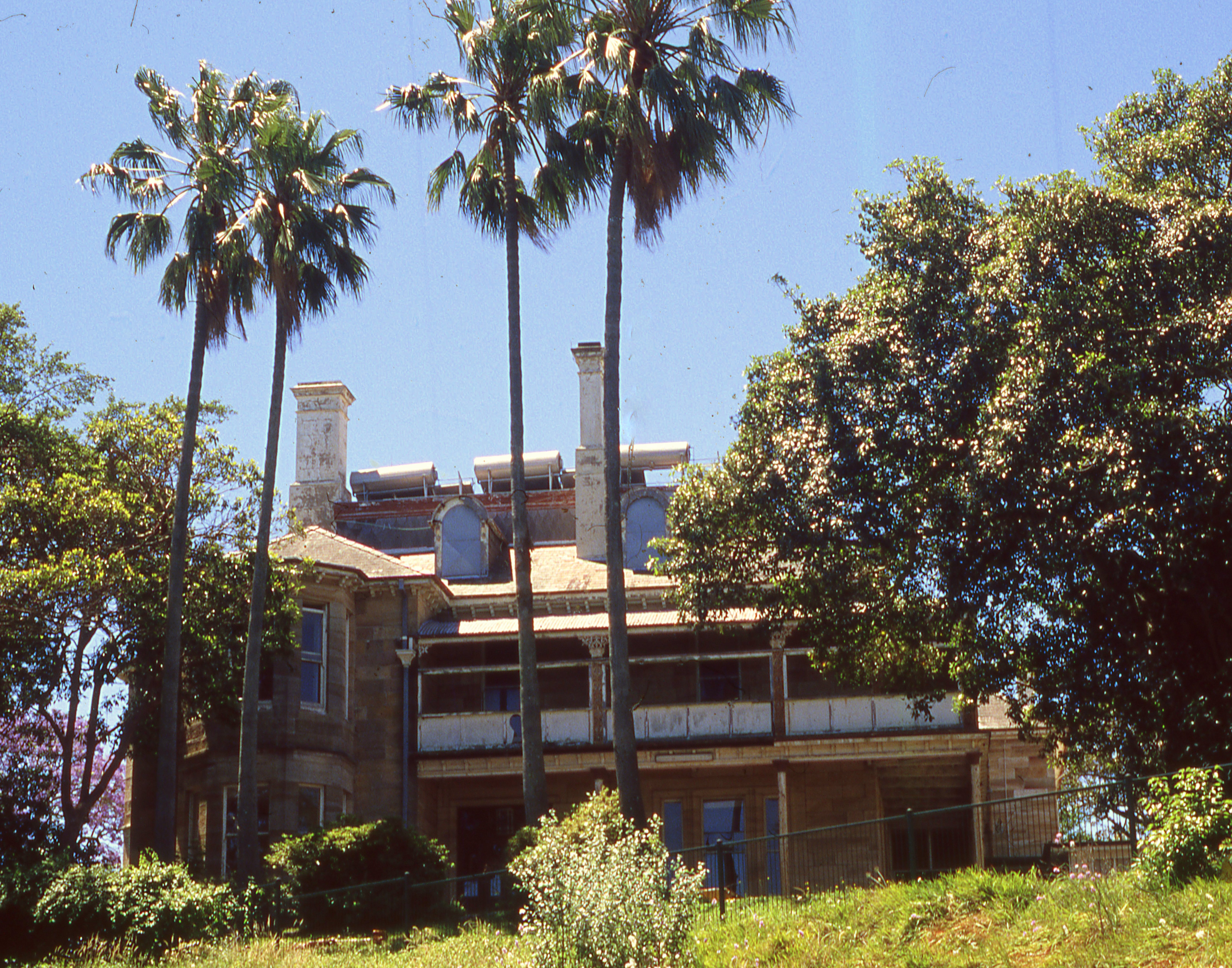
- Graythwaite in 2007, prior to its restoration completed in 2014.

- Location within Sydney Location within Australia
- 33°50′27″S 151°12′11″E
- Location: 20 Edward Street, North Sydney, New South Wales, Australia

History
- Built: 1858–1885

Site notes
- Architects: Goold and Hilling; Edmund Blacket
- Architectural style: Victorian Italianate
- Owner: Sydney Church of England Grammar School

New South Wales Heritage Register
- Official name: Graythwaite; Graythwaite Nursing Home
- Type: State heritage (built)
- Designated: 1 November 2002
- Reference no.: 1617
- Type: Nursing Home
- Category: Health Services
- Builders: Aaron Loveridge

Graythwaite is a heritage-listed former private home and former hospital and now school administration building located at 20 Edward Street, North Sydney, New South Wales, Australia. It was designed by Goold and Hilling and Edmund Blacket and built from 1858 to 1885 by Aaron Loveridge. The property is owned by the Sydney Church of England Grammar School. It was added to the New South Wales State Heritage Register on 1 November 2002.

== History ==
In September 1832, Thomas Walker, a public official, paid A£60 and nine shillings for a 16-hectare (39-acre) land grant. On the 25 October 1833, Thomas Walker conveyed 5.3 hectares (13 acres) of his grant, to the north and east of where Graythwaite was later built, to William Miller, for £20 and thirteen shillings. At the time of the purchase of 16 hectares (39 acres), Walker's address was 41 Pitt Street, Sydney. When the land was surveyed in 1832, there were no buildings on the land. By 1837, Walker had built himself a residence on his grant almost adjacent to Miller's newly built house. An 1837 plan of the Government of New South Wales Reserve on North Shore shows Walker's and Miller's houses. In January 1845 Walker drew up his will bequeathing his house "Euroka" and 6.5 hectares (16 acres) to his wife and he died in 1850.

Three years after his death, the house and remaining land was sold to George Tuting, a mercer of Pitt Street, Sydney for £1,500. In that conveyance, the grounds are described as 46 hectares (113 acres). Tuting held the land only briefly, possibly for the purposes of speculation at a time when land and house prices boomed in the early 1850s after the discovery of gold. He sold the house and land in 1853, for more than double what he had bought it for.

The new owner, Edwin Sayers, was a shipowner who had arrived in Sydney from Melbourne about 1850. He was mainly interested in the coastal shipping trade. Sayers occupied Euroka and remained there until 1868. Sayers added a large new two-storey sandstone wing c. 1855, created the terracing and planted an orchard on the lower grassed area on Union Street. As a merchant seeking to utilise all of his available capital and with the problems of unexpected calls being made upon his resources, from unexpected financial crises or due to the vagaries of shipping weather, Sayers needed to use his substantial house as security for loans at times. Hence, on 23 July 1855, Tuting conveyed the house and land to Edwin Sayers, Sydney for £3,900. Sayers' financial affairs became embarrassed and he mortgaged his home.

On 16 April 1860 Sayers conveyed the title to Clark Irving and others as trustees for the benefit of Sayers' creditors. On 20 April 1860 further conveyance of all of Sayers' property to trustees was signed. Sayers' financial difficulties continued until 1867 when the property was offered at auction by Richardson & Wrench, on behalf of the mortgagee, on 8 July 1867. There were no buyers.

The property was next purchased by Thomas Allwright Dibbs, the manager of the Commercial Banking Company of Sydney. He had been buying up many parcels of land on the North Shore. By 1882 Graythwaite was the family home of Thomas Dibbs and in 1888 the mortgage of 1882 was discharged. Dibbs, c. 1875, demolished Walker's house and added to the Sayers sandstone building to complete Euroka / Graythwaite as it remains today. Dibbs was a huge landowner on the lower north shore and bought the adjoining Holtermann property when Holtermann died and later sold it to the church for Shore School. Apparently Holtermann closely guarded access to his tower and so many of the early photographic panoramas of Sydney were taken from Graythwaite instead. Most of the current garden dates from Dibbs c. 1875 (the fig trees can be seen as little trees protected by wooden frames from wandering stock in the 1875 photos). The garden includes a pepper berry/ white walnut (Cryptocarya obovata), a very rare rainforest species, native to northern NSW rainforests and once native to the Illawarra (apparently extinct in that district since the mid-1800s). Only one other specimen of it is known in Sydney, in Prince Alfred Park. Both may owe their presence to associations with colonial botanists James Backhouse and Allan Cunningham (who recorded the species in the Illawarra in c. 1811), and then-director of the Botanic Gardens, Sydney, Charles Moore, who did much to promote the planting of NSW and Queensland rainforest tree species on public sites.

Dibbs' prestige as well as his reputation as an astute and skillful manager of the Bank underlay his renown. His management of the Bank was generally credited with saving it from the fate of other less fortunate banks in the 1890s Depression. From his interest in philanthropy, sprang the gesture which converted his family residence into a convalescent home. Like many Australians, Dibbs was apparently shocked at the carnage taking place overseas during World War I. In April 1915, Australian troops first saw action when they landed at Gallipoli. Dibbs donated his home, Graythwaite, to the state as a convalescent home for soldiers returning from the front.

On 1 October 1915 the property was formally transferred by Dibbs to the Crown, in consideration of "my admiration of and sincere sympathy for those brave men who have so unselfishly given their services and their lives fighting for the Empire in the cause of Justice and liberty." as a 'Convalescent Home for our Sick and Wounded Soldiers and Sailors and when not required for that purpose as a Convalescent Home in perpetuity for distressed subjects of the British Empire regardless of Sect or Creed.' An official opening of Graythwaite was held on 1 March 1916. Dibbs presented the deeds of Graythwaite to the Premier of New South Wales who handed the property on to the NSW branch of the Red Cross. Eleanor MacKinnon who had been honorary secretary to the State' branch of the British Red Cross Society since 1914 became a committee member. Graythwaite was altered to fit it out as a convalescent home and was at first used for less severely ill convalescents. In 1918, the Red Cross decided that Graythwaite should be converted into a Hostel for long term cases of disablement. A change in emphasis required substantial changes to the building. Graythwaite was used as a convalescent home to 1977, when civil cases were referred by the Health Commission. The Red Cross then decided to relinquish the hospital to enable it to be used as geriatric hospital by the Home of Peace Hospitals, under the supervision of the Health Commission. The buildings were officially handed over in December 1980.

== Description ==
=== Site and landscape ===
The site is situated with dual frontages to Union and Edward Streets, generally rectangular in shape with a finger of land making an "L" to Union Street. The terrace embankments and driveway north from Union street are fairly densely vegetated with mature trees and shrubs including native and exotic species and flatter areas are grassed. Vehicular and pedestrian access is obtained from both Union and Edward Streets, however the preferred and most used is Edward Street directly behind the buildings to a small visitor car park. Entry from Union Street is through a recessed entrance gateway via a formalised driveway up the south-facing slope to the front of the historic building complex.

To some extent 20th century building development near the historic building group has severed and/or changed the immediate landscaped gardens but remnants of the earlier plantings still remain close to the building. Views and vistas from the building group remain substantially unaltered from site development since the late 19th century. The semi detached villas and other subdivision developments to the south and west are screened by vegetation even through they remain close by in distance terms. The land slope and terraced vegetation to the south and west substantially screen nearby urban development from view. Views and vistas of suburban Sydney, the harbour, Parramatta River and mountains to the west are visible above the tree line.

Up until its 2009 purchase of Graythwaite, The Shore School owned land immediately east and north of Graythwaite, and further west. This land all formed part of the Graythwaite estate under earlier owners, and comprises a range of buildings including houses built for Dibb's children, c. 1880s, and later school development, c. 1900 and later. Immediately west of the property (and under it) dives a railway line tunnel (half way along the western boundary) being the main northern line to Waverton/Hornsby. This runs directly west/east under the property.

The terracing on the property is thought to have been made initially for grape/vine planting, although this was abandoned at some point as unsuccessful, much of the terraces facing south, an orientation not suited to ripening fruit. Three or four major terraces face south, and an unknown number (vegetation is too dense to see as yet) to the west of the site, which is steeper. Ground levels appear to have been modified in terms of slope, as well as terracing. Much deliberate and accidental tree planting has followed on these terraces, making the site rather secluded now, with the exception of long views from the main house south/south-sou-east to the city/Pyrmont, and west/west-south-west to Balmain/Leichhardt and the river.

Mature specimen trees remaining include perimeter plantings of Moreton Bay figs (Ficus macrophylla) lining boundaries to adjacent housing on Union Street (south) and Bank Street (west). These are at least 100 years old, some of them magnificent specimens, others planted closely (as windbreaks?).

Mature tree specimens across the site comprise mainly figs (about 40 large specimens) being a large number of Moreton Bay figs, also Port Jackson figs (F.rubiginosa), giant bamboo to the west of the main house, and to the south-east of the main building group, firewheel tree (Stenocarpus sinuatus), pepperberry tree (north NSW rainforest species - see below), Cook's pine (Araucaria columnaris) - a very tall specimen visible across (south of) the Harbour Bridge) on this ridge, Monterey pine (Pinus radiata), four Florida palms (Washingtonia robusta) and Norfolk Island hibiscus (Lagunaria patersonia) line a carriage loop immediately south of the main house, and large numbers of white/grey poplar, Populus alba, some of which are suckers of older trees/regrowth clumps, spreading (but which probably represent earlier shelter belt or ornamental plantings of this species). Recent (late 1990s) plantings of Populus x simonii have been put in east of the drive to replace rust-affected Lombardy poplars (P.nigra 'Italica').

A carriage driveway from Union Street is lined on the west with brush box (Lophostemon confertus) and on the east by camphor laurels (Cinnamomum camphora), which appear to be at least pre 1950s, possibly 1930s. A pepper berry / white walnut tree (Cryptocarya obovata) is east of the drive towards the top, near the house. This is a very rare rainforest species, native to northern NSW rainforests and once native to the Illawarra (apparently extinct in that district since the mid-1800s) and only one other specimen of it is known in Sydney, in Prince Alfred Park. Both may owe their presence to associations with colonial botanists James Backhouse and Allan Cunnungham, and then-director of the Botanic Gardens, Sydney, Charles Moore, who did much to promote the planting of NSW and Queensland rainforest tree species.

A number of fruit trees remain or have been planted in the last 10–20 years in some cases on the banks immediately west and south of the main house. These may reflect replanting of earlier orchard areas. These include citrus (oranges, lemon, mandarin), fig, loquat, pomegranate, carob, peach, banana (extensive clumps of these), a quince tree, pawpaw, white mulberry (over 40 years old) etc.

Weed species/naturalising plants

A number of "weedy" species trees, sh, although volunteers are clearing the worst of these and replanting locally native and NSW rainforest species to replace them. "Weeds" may of course represent earlier deliberate plantings, which have reproduced themselves on site, or wild seedlings introduced by visiting birds dropping seeds or regenerating naturally with relatively little disturbance/changing light conditions as mature trees fall or are removed. Species include white poplars (as above), long leaved privet (Ligustrum ovalifolium), small leaved privet (L.sinense), nettle tree (Celtis australis), camphor laurels (as above), sweet pittosporum (Pittosporum undulatum) (probably wildlings ex bird-dropped seed), brush box (as above), night cestrum (C.parqui), coral tree (Erythrina x sykesii), smooth leaved rambutan/native quince, Alectryon species (local native, some bird-seed dropped, some natural regeneration), bleedling heart tree (Omolanthus populnifolius), African olive (Olea africana), lantana (L.camara), much of which has been removed since 2000 by volunteers, asthma plant (Parietaria sp.), Madiera vine, butterfly bush (Cassia tomentosa), fennel, moth plant (Araujia sp.).

=== Buildings ===
The building group known as the site of the former Graythwaite Nursing Home is positioned on an elevated part of the site at the north eastern corner is ringed by security fencing to prevent patients straying. The remainder of land steps down to the south and west with graded embankments and flatter areas to provide a terraced effect. The three-storey substantial building with associated single-storey masonry buildings is the historic building known as Graythwaite. From on site inspections it was established that the periphery of mainly single-storey buildings relates to the property's use since 1916 as a convalescent and nursing hospital. Physical evaluation of the perceived historical hub buildings was carried out during the study period and reinforces the notion that the three-storey sandstone building has grown from smaller building complex, possibly dating to the 1830s.

The Graythwaite property comprises:

1. A substantial sandstone Victorian Villa with attached kitchen wings, generally two- and three-storeys respectively. Single storey sandstone outbuilding with loft (former 1830s stables) Single storey masonry outbuilding (ashlar finish) (former secretaries office and staff dining room)
2. Single storey brick building (former recreation room)
3. Single storey brick outbuilding with attic (former 1880s stables)
4. Single storey hospital ward building and service additions and service addition c. 1918. Alterations to hospital ward (infill of verandah) c. 1936.
5. Service yard and car park.
6. Associated terraced and landscaped grounds.
7. Recent linking building.

Graythwaite is a former c. 1823 residence which has been altered and has grown through the 19th century from a less prominent building to a grand villa c. 1882 and then undergone adaptation to a convalescent hospital and nursing home after 1916. Owing to the building's development over considerable time there remains recognisable features from all stages of its development. The building can be described as having three main areas, a) the substantial sandstone Victorian Villa with attached kitchen wing, b) a single storey sandstone outbuilding with loft, c) and a single storey masonry outbuilding (ashlar finish).

For further analysis of the physical evidence on site, refer to the Conservation Management Plan prepared by Graham Edds and Associates for the NSW Department of Health dated February 2000 and endorsed by the Heritage Council of NSW in August 2000.

Two brick/stone lined cisterns were discovered to the west of the main house, and recently studied by Goddon Mackay Logan. One appears to be double brick lined, the other sandstone.

=== Condition ===
As at 29 October 2001, the structural condition of all buildings on the property appear to be well founded and in a structurally stable condition. The site and buildings are occupied on a day-to-day basis. The site & landscaped grounds are maintained regularly. A volunteer group is weeding the "bush" areas of the garden, and planting locally native and rainforest species to replace weeds such as nettle trees, privet, white/grey poplars, sweet pittosporum (native but weedy).

=== Modifications and dates ===
The Graythwaite group has evolved through three main phases of development:

- Phase I 1830s residence and outbuildings;
- c. 1855 terracing created, planted an orchard on the lower grassed area on Union St. Most of the current garden dates from Dibbs c. 1875
- Phase II 1880s major renovation;
- Phase III alterations and additions since 1916 for use as a convalescent hospital and nursing home.

Following the 2009 acquisition of Graythwaite by Shore School, further extensive renovations were completed in 2014.

=== Further information ===
Zoning - site zoned special uses. Adjoining land to south and west (Union and Bank Streets) zoned 2(b), permitting two storey development, residential mainly. Commercial use site immediately south-west of GT - which has adaptively reused a former GT/Shore School building, c. 1870s.

== Heritage listing ==
As at 28 October 2016, Graythwaite is an early example of a prominent North Shore residence which has been altered extensively over its life to reflect the social standing and status of its changing ownership. The early development of the property is associated with Thomas Walker, Deputy Commissary General. His substantial two storey residence "Euroka" built in the mid-1830s is encapsulated within "Graythwaite" and together with the detached stables are arguably the earliest remaining fabric of the early settlement of North Sydney.

The sandstone stables are the oldest examples of stables outbuilding in North Sydney and provides evidence of the importance of the horse for transport. The property also has strong associations with the Dibbs family and particularly Thomas Allwright Dibbs, manager of the Commercial Banking Company of Sydney, who was also ex-officio appointee to the Royal Commission on the Public Service of 1887–90.

Its present use as a convalescent home reflects the compassion and generosity of Thomas Allwright Dibbs to provide a caring place for Australian soldiers on their return from the Great War. The grounds on which "Graythwaite" is located retains intact its size and configuration of the 1873 subdivision. It retains remnants of the extensive garden curtilage developed from that period and during Dibbs' ownership and retains those magnificent harbour views and vistas to the south and west.

This 2.7-hectare (6.7-acre) property is an unusually large land parcel considering its close proximity to the CBD of North Sydney which retains substantial land terracing reinforced with mature landscaping. The buildings grand Victorian Italianate architectural form located on the highest part of the property reflects a major renovation, within the Victorian period 1880-1885 during Thomas Allwright Dibbs' ownership, to capture outstanding views and vistas of Sydney Harbour and beyond. The landmark qualities of this building is no longer apparent when viewed from its main street frontage, but the outward views and vistas from the building to the south and west are unparalleled and extensive. Building alterations and additions that have occurred since 1936 and 1952 for use as a Red Cross Hospital have compromised historic fabric and the aesthetic significance of the earlier residential building complex.

'Graythwaite' is valued by the surrounding community for its historical significance as an example of North Shore residential for the wealthy. Its significance has also been established socially through its use as a convalescent home, a hostel for long term disablement and then a geriatric hospital. The main building (although altered for hospital use since 1916) retains detailed finishes, fireplaces and hardware from the Victorian period usually lost in buildings of this type in private ownership. It also contains timber floor and ceiling framing of pit sawn origins with ceilings framing connections using timber pegged tenons, further establishing its early origins and importance of "Euroka" as one of the earliest surviving structures in the North Sydney area.

The former stables outbuilding with loft is a remnant of early vernacular form and formed part of the original building group on land granted to Thomas Walker in 1832. The residence and stables buildings contain remnants of all phases of the property's development and this is reflected in its high archaeological, educational and research potential. The property has been recognised by others to contain one of the largest and most significant collections of late 19th-century cultural plantings in the North Sydney area.

Graythwaite was listed on the New South Wales State Heritage Register on 1 November 2002 having satisfied the following criteria.

The place is important in demonstrating the course, or pattern, of cultural or natural history in New South Wales.

Graythwaite has historical significance as an early example of a prominent North Shore residence which has been altered extensively over its life to reflect the social standing and status of its changing ownership.

The place has a strong or special association with a person, or group of persons, of importance of cultural or natural history of New South Wales's history.

The property has strong associations with the Dibbs family and particularly Thomas Allwright Dibbs, Manager of the Commercial Banking Company of Sydney, who was also ex-officio appointee to the Royal Commission on the Public Service of 1887 - 90. Its present use as a convalescent home reflects the compassion and generosity of Thomas Allwright Dibbs to provide a caring place for Australian soldiers on their return from the Great War. The grounds on which Graythwaite is located remains intact in size and configuration of the 1873 subdivision. It retains remnants of the extensive garden curtilage developed from that period and during Dibbs' ownership and retains those magnificent harbour views and vistas to the south and west.

The place is important in demonstrating aesthetic characteristics and/or a high degree of creative or technical achievement in New South Wales.

Graythwaite has aesthetic significance because this 2.7-hectare (6.7-acre) property is an unusually large land parcel considering its close proximity to the CBD of North Sydney which retains substantial land terracing reinforced with mature landscaping. The buildings grand Victorian Italianate architectural form located on the highest part of the property reflects a major renovation, within the Victorian period 1880 - 1885 during Thomas Allwright Dibbs' ownership, to capture outstanding views and vistas of Sydney Harbour and beyond.

The landmark qualities of this building is no longer apparent when viewed from its main street frontage, but the outward views and vistas from the building to the south and west are unparalleled and extensive. Remnant landscape elements and plantings are evident over the entire site area. These remnants are in the form of mature isolated and group plantings nearby the building group but extend to the terraced forecourt in rows and clusters on the terrace embankments. Other mature plantings line the driveway entrance from Union Street and extend to the main building then to the west and links up with the car parking areas at the 1880s coach house and Edward Street public car park. To the south and west, remnant landscape plantings provide a dense barrier to the immediate suburban development. Distant views and vistas over the top of the landscape provide a pleasant outlook. Formalised garden plots and pathways are located between several of the buildings.

The place has a strong or special association with a particular community or cultural group in New South Wales for social, cultural or spiritual reasons.

Graythwaite is socially significant to the surrounding community for its historical significance as an example of North Shore residence for the wealthy. Its significance has also been established socially through its use as a convalescent home, a hostel for long term disablement and then a geriatric hospital.

The place has potential to yield information that will contribute to an understanding of the cultural or natural history of New South Wales.

Graythwaite has technical/research significance because the main building (although altered for hospital use since 1916) retains detailed finishes, fireplaces and hardware from the Victorian period usually lost in buildings of this type in private ownership. It also contains timber floor and ceiling framing of pit sawn origins with ceiling framing connections using timber pegged tenons, further establishing its early origins and importance as one of the earliest surviving structures in the North Sydney area.

The former stables building with loft is a remnant of early vernacular form and formed part of the original building group on land granted to Thomas Walker in 1832.

The buildings contain remnants from all phases of the property's development and this is reflected in its high archaeological, educational and research potential.

The property has been recognised to contain one of the largest and most significant collections of late 19th-century cultural plantings in the North Sydney area.

The place possesses uncommon, rare or endangered aspects of the cultural or natural history of New South Wales.

The highest levels of significance of Graythwaite then relates to its associations with the early development of North Sydney and not necessarily its Convalescent Hospital use. With regard to its historic, aesthetic and technological/research criterion, Graythwaite retains remnants both in its building fabric and its landscape from the earliest development of the North Shore and is considered rare and of state significance.

The place is important in demonstrating the principal characteristics of a class of cultural or natural places/environments in New South Wales.

The social criterion is assessed as representative, reflecting the choice of the North Shore, particularly North Sydney, for development of substantial residences and its later association with health care since 1916.

== See also ==
- Sydney Church of England Grammar School
- Australian residential architectural styles
