= David Dix =

Australian rugby union player (born 1967)

- Full name: David Peter Alexander Dix
- Born: 27 October 1967 (age 59) Sydney, NSW, Australia
- School: Shore School
- University: University of Sydney; University of Cambridge

Rugby union career
- Position: Lock
International career
Years	Team	Apps	(Points)
1989, 1992	Australia		

David Peter Alexander Dix (born 27 October 1967) is an Australian former rugby union player.

Dix was born in Sydney and educated at Shore School, where he concentrated mostly on rowing but had one season in the 1st XV. He was in the 1985/86 Australian Schools side that went through a tour of the United Kingdom undefeated. After finishing his schooling, Dix had a year of first-grade rugby with Quirindi, then in 1987 began attending the University of Sydney. He finished second to Simon Poidevin in the 1989 Rothmans Medal while playing for the university.

A lock, Dix won a Wallabies call up in 1989 as a replacement for Steve Tuynman on their tour of Canada and France, serving as an understudy to Peter FitzSimons and Rod McCall. He debuted for the Wallabies against the North American Wolverines and made a further three uncapped appearances in France. In 1991, Dix got recalled by the Wallabies for a tour of New Zealand, but had to withdraw as he was about to begin his studies at the University of Cambridge, where he twice won rugby blues and rowed for Pembroke College. He was in England when the Wallabies lost several players with injuries on their 1992 end of year tour and got called into the squad to play a tour match against Welsh Students.
