= Bob Radford =

Australian cricket administrator (1943–2004)

Robert Michael Radford AM (18 October 1943 – 28 February 2004) was an Australian cricket administrator.

== Sporting career ==
Radford represented New South Wales in baseball. He also represented the Sydney Church of England Grammar School first XI in cricket.

== Administrative career ==
In 1970, Radford joined the New South Wales Cricket Association as Assistant Secretary. He was at the same time Assistant Secretary of the Australian Cricket Board of Control. In 1976, he became Secretary (an executive position) of the NSWCA, later re-titled chief executive. He served in this role until retirement in 1995. He was a founding member of the Bradman Foundation, and served as its chairman 1993–1997.

Radford was a life member of the NSWCA, the Bradman Foundation and the Marylebone Cricket Club, the last a rare honour as life memberships are usually only awarded to players of great distinction. The Bob Radford Scholarship for young cricket administrators awarded by the Bradman Foundation is named in his honour. It is designed to assist young cricket administrators to gain knowledge, skills and experience that will benefit their careers and, through them, the game of cricket. The Bob Radford Room in the pavilion at the Bradman Oval, Bowral, New South Wales, is named in his honour.

He was appointed Member of the Order of Australia in 1992 and was awarded the Australian Sports Medal in 2000.
