= Basil Travers =

England international rugby union player, cricketer & educator (1919-1998)

Basil 'Jika' Travers AM, OBE
- Born: Basil Holmes Travers; 7 July 1919 Mosman, Sydney, New South Wales, Australia
- Died: 18 December 1998 (aged 79) Sydney, Australia

Rugby union career
- Position: Flanker
International career
Years	Team	Apps	(Points)
1947–1949	England	6	(4)
- Cricket career

Cricket information
- Batting: Right-handed
- Bowling: Right-arm medium-pace

Domestic team information
- Years: Team
- 1946–1948: Oxford University

Career statistics
Competition	First-class
Matches	24
Runs scored	718
Batting average	25.64
100s/50s	–/4
Top score	65 not out
Balls bowled	3221
Wickets	48
Bowling average	30.20
5 wickets in innings	–
10 wickets in match	–
Best bowling	4/65
Catches/stumpings	27/–
- Source: Cricinfo, 28 May 2014

Basil Holmes 'Jika' Travers, AM, OBE, (7 July 1919 – 18 December 1998) was an Australian sportsman and educator who played in the England national rugby union team and played first-class cricket with Oxford University.

He was Headmaster of the Sydney Church of England Grammar School (Shore) from 1959 to 1984. In 1983 he was made a Member of the Order of Australia.

== Military career ==
Travers served with Australian forces in New Guinea in World War II as a brigade major. He was awarded the OBE for his service.

== Rugby career ==
Travers, a Shore old boy, went to New College, Oxford, after the war to study on a Rhodes Scholarship. He was capped six times in total for England, the first in the 1947 Five Nations Championship, which England were joint winners of, where he played in their games against both Ireland and Wales. He also played in a friendly against his home country in 1948, as well as making appearances in the 1948 and 1949 Five Nations. The only points of his international career came courtesy of two conversions in a Test against Scotland. He continued to play rugby after returning to Australia and captained New South Wales to victory over the British and Irish Lions in 1950.

== Cricket career ==
An all-rounder at cricket, he was a right-handed batsman and right-arm medium pace bowler. Travers scored 718 runs at 25.64 and took 48 wickets at 30.20 from his 24 first-class matches. All but one of those matches were for Oxford University, with the other coming in a match for the Free Foresters Cricket Club when he swapped sides and played against the University. Although he never scored a century or managed a five wicket haul, Travers made four half centuries and had best figures of 4/65.

One of Travers' biggest tests came on his first-class debut, against India in 1946. Oxford batted first and Travers was dismissed for just 13 by Vinoo Mankad, in what would be his only innings of the match. He had success with the ball though, taking the wickets of middle order players Raosaheb Nimbalkar and Nawab of Pataudi to finish with 2/48. He finished the season with an impressive 27 wickets at 24.25.

== Education career ==
Returning to Australia, Travers was the Headmaster of the Launceston Church Grammar School from 1953 to 1958, and later the Headmaster of the Sydney Church of England Grammar School from 1959 to 1984. An Australian Schoolboys rugby trophy has been named in his honour, called the BH Travers Shield.

== Community ==
Travers was appointed (1970–1982) as the NSW Chair of The Duke of Edinburgh's International Award - Australia and in that capacity also served on the national Board. As Headmaster of the Sydney Church of England Grammar School he introduced the Award to the school in 1959, making it the first body to deliver The Duke of Edinburgh's International Award in Australia.
