= Jim Penman =

Australian businessman (born 1952)

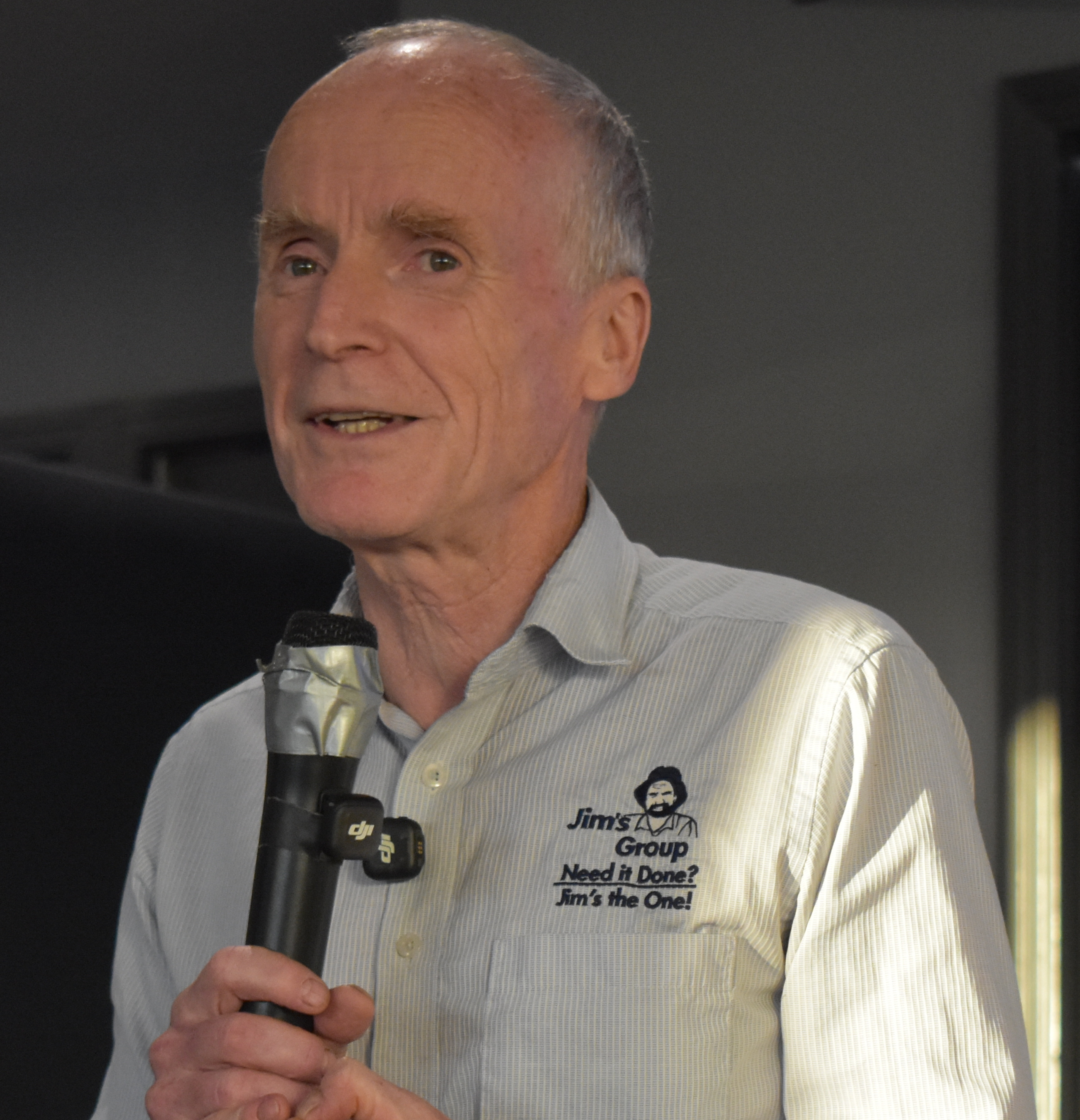
- Penman in 2025

Owner of Jim's Group

Personal details
- Born: David James Penman; 25 May 1952 (age 74) Stourbridge, England
- Party: Libertarian
- Children: 11
- Education: La Trobe University
- Profession: Franchisor, historian
- Website: jimpenman.com.au

David James Penman (born 25 May 1952) is an Australian businessman and Libertarian political candidate. He is the founder of Jim's Group, a franchising company specialising in lawn care services, established in 1989.

Penman is also known for his publications and research on human culture, history, and epigenetics. His work, which is partly based on studies funded by him at La Trobe University, examines the influence of genetics, epigenetics, and environmental factors on human behavior and societal development.

In 2017, he founded the Institute for Social Neuroscience (ISN), a private research institute focused on epigenetics and human behavior. Penman has described his ideas as aligned with conservative liberalism and neoliberalism.

== Early life ==
Penman's mother, Margaret Moxham, was a teacher from Scone, New South Wales, who met Tom Penman at a Youth Hostel in Wales, while she was holidaying in the United Kingdom. The family emigrated to Australia in 1955 and eventually there were four children: Lynne, David (Jim), Chris and Gill. Tom Penman worked in different roles, including academic with the University of Adelaide and Chief Engineer at Carlton United Breweries.

== Education ==
Penman attended Prince Alfred College in Adelaide, Sydney Church of England Grammar School and Melbourne Grammar, followed by an Honours Degree in history at La Trobe University. In 1974, Penman commenced PhD degree studies at La Trobe University, under the supervision of June Philipp, who was part of a network of ethnographic historians called "the Melbourne Group" The PhD thesis looked at character as a key to understanding history. Penman's thesis was initially rejected in 1981, although Penman's supervisor then suggested that he rewrite the methodology section of the thesis. Penman followed the suggestion, and the thesis was re-submitted in 1983 and subsequently accepted in April 1984, under the title 'Personality and Social Change'. At the time, the thesis did not attract any scholarly attention.

== Jim's Group ==
After the completion of his PhD in 1983, Penman gradually turned his part-time lawn mowing business into a franchising business, focussing on setting up and selling lawn-mowing rounds and taking on sub-contractors, rather than simply mowing lawns. Between 1983 and 1989, he sold around 100 rounds.

In 1988, VIP Home Services came into the market in Victoria, which prompted Penman to systemise his own processes and create the Jim's Mowing franchise. Penman states that his mandate is to be fanatical about service to both franchisees and customers. However, he has a reputation for becoming angry quickly and for "being a firer", with a high turnover at the Jim's Group national office. After firing his sister, the two have been estranged.

After launching the franchise business in 1989, Penman expanded to include additional industries. The first addition was cleaning services, and by 2012 the franchise model had been adapted to over 30 service industries. However, Penman's business model was also criticised in 2012 for being inappropriate for managing the large number of franchisees.

During the COVID-19 pandemic in 2020, Penman was a critic of how Victoria's lockdown rules were applied to his franchisees, including encouraging them to continue work despite lockdown restrictions. In August he discussed the possibility of legal action against the Victorian government, and in October it was announced that about 700 Jim's Mowing franchisees were joining a class action led by Carbone Lawyers. As of 2023, Jim’s Group has over 5,200 franchisees in Australia, New Zealand, Canada, and the United Kingdom.

== Research interests ==
In 2006, Penman began funding his own research projects to further the ideas he laid out in his PhD thesis. The initial $500,000 in 2006 had grown to approximately a million per year by 2017, according to Penman, with him aiming to increase that to 3 million per year. By 2025, the annual research spending had reached approximately $3 million. The intended application of the research being to halt his predicted economic and moral decline of the West, with subsequent takeover by China and then a unified Africa.

In 2015, Penman self-published Biohistory and Biohistory: The Decline and Fall of the West, both of which focus on epigenetics. In Biohistory: The Decline and Fall of the West, Penman argues that disparities between populations cannot be solely attributed to genetic differences. He suggests that although humans share genetic similarities, variations in wealth, creativity, political systems, and other factors can be understood through epigenetics—the study of how environmental factors influence gene activity. Penman believes that changes in temperament over time are a primary cause of societal differences, and that human behavior and traits are shaped by how genes are expressed, rather than by the genetic code alone.

Penman rejects the idea that genetic differences account for disparities between groups, emphasizing the genetic similarity of humans. He notes that, historically, groups such as the ancient Greeks and Romans considered northern Europeans inferior, and similar beliefs were held about Africans compared to Europeans, as well as about women compared to men. In Penman's view, these beliefs were incorrect, and he argues that differences between populations are better explained by epigenetics.

While Penman's views have been subject to criticism, he clarifies that he rejects the idea that genetics alone explains differences between groups. He stresses the role of epigenetics in shaping behavior and societal development and attributes misunderstandings about this topic to general confusion regarding the science of epigenetics.

Penman stated that after his PhD thesis was rejected, he could not get an academic post and had to self-fund his research interests. However, in 2006 he began funding research at La Trobe University's School of Psychological Science under Tony Paolini based on the theories in his books. His primary research collaborator, Paolini, said, "I think, basically, Jim has a lot of ideas and I, as a scientist, help to funnel those ideas into testable hypotheses". As part of this work with La Trobe, Penman has co-authored some articles on calorie restriction in rats. In 2017, he founded the Institute for Social Neuroscience (ISN) Psychology, a private research institute and tertiary education provider in which Penman was the sole member of the Board of Directors, and a member of the Academic Board along with Paolini.

His intended future research includes the behavioral and physiological benefits of mild food shortage (without restricting food) on adverse epigenetic effects of early environment and a drug to make people more focused, more hard working, more intelligent and creative.

== Political activities ==
Penman joined the Libertarian Party in October 2025, with The Australian reporting that his focus would be on housing policies. Penman was endorsed in February 2026 by the Libertarian Party to contest the electoral district of Northcote, currently held by Labor MP Kat Theophanous, at the 2026 Victorian state election.

== Personal life ==
Penman has been married four times and has 11 children. He was an atheist up to his conversion to Christianity in 1979, and he describes himself as an evangelical Christian. He attended a conservative creationist church, although he himself is an evolutionist. He is currently a member of Crossway Baptist Church.

== Bibliography ==
=== Jim's Mowing and franchise development ===
- J. Penman (1992) The Cutting Edge: Jim's Mowing, a Franchise Story ISBN 0850915171, 9780850915174
- J. Penman (1998) Surprised by Success: The Very Australian Story of Jim's Mowing ISBN 0646912526, 9780646912523
- J. Penman (2003) What Will They Franchise Next?: The Story of Jim's Group ISBN 9780975113202
- J. Penman (2013) Selling by Not Selling: From $24 to a Turnover of $24 Million ISBN 0646360736, 9780646360737
- J. Penman (2022) Every Customer a Fan: The Story of Jim’s Group ISBN 9781669645573

=== Epigenetics, culture and society ===
- Jim Penman (1992) The Hungry Ape: Biology And The Fall Of Civilisations ISBN 9780646078571
- J. Penman (2015) Biohistory: Decline and Fall of the West, Cambridge Scholars ISBN 978-1443871303
- J. Penman (2015) Biohistory, Cambridge Scholars ISBN 978-1443871655
- J. Penman (2021) Epigenetics and Character: The Biology Behind History, The Biohistory Foundation
- J. Penman & A. Pearson (2026) Birth-Rate Crisis: Reclaiming Family and Purpose in a Dopamine-Driven World ISBN 9781923870017

=== Audiobooks ===
- J. Penman (2022) Every Customer a Fan: The Story of Jim’s Group (read by Les Horovitz) ISBN 9781669645573
