= Rodney Clapp =

Rodney R. Clapp is a Christian author and editor. Clapp was formerly a longtime associate editor for Christianity Today and until 1999 was the senior editor for academic and general books at InterVarsity Press. He also used to be an editor with Brazos Press. Currently, he is an editor with Wipf and Stock Publishers.

Clapp is a member of the Episcopal Church.

== Bibliography ==
- Families at the Crossroads (1993) ISBN 0-8308-1655-0
- A Peculiar People (1996) ISBN 0-8308-1990-8
- The Consuming Passion (1998) ISBN 0-8308-1897-9
- Border Crossings (2000) ISBN 1-58743-003-7
- The People of the Truth with Robert E. Webber (2001) ISBN 1-57910-560-2
- Tortured Wonders (2006) ISBN 1-58743-184-X
- Johnny Cash and the Great American Contradiction (2008) ISBN 0-664-23088-1
- Naming Neoliberalism: Exposing the Spirit of Our Age (2021) ISBN 1-50647-265-6
