= Irving Innerfield =

American medical researcher

- Died: December 4, 1976
- Known for: Discovering that the enzyme trypsin can be used to dissolve blood clots
- Scientific career
- Fields: Medical research, inflammation

Irving Innerfield (died 4 December 1976) was a medical researcher in the United States of America. A specialist in inflammation, he discovered that the enzyme trypsin could be used to dissolve blood clots.

In November 1952, on hearing that Elizabeth Kenny (the Australian who developed physical therapy as a treatment for polio and established many clinics for polio victims in the USA using her methods) was dying in Toowoomba, Queensland, Australia from a cerebral thrombosis, Innerfield dispatched his experimental drug based on trypsin by air to Brisbane to treat her thrombosis. Unfortunately Kenny was close to death when the drug arrived and was administered, dying the following day.
