= William Godfrey Thomas =

Australian rower (1915–1982)

Bill Thomas
Personal information
- Full name: William Godfrey Thomas
- Nationality: Australian
- Born: 3 July 1915 Nathalia, Victoria, Australia
- Died: 25 August 1982 (aged 67) Sydney, Australia
- Education: Shore School

Sport
- Sport: Rowing
- Club: Mosman Rowing Club, Sydney Rowing Club

Achievements and titles
- National finals: King's Cup 1936
Medal record
Representing Australia
British Empire Games
Silver medal – second place	1938 Sydney	Men's Eight

William Godfrey Thomas (3 July 1915 – 25 August 1982) was a New South Wales and Australian representative rower and "eminent rowing coach".

Thomas’ first national championship win was in Perth rowing bow with the 1936 NSW Men's Interstate Eight crew winning the Australian Championship and Kings Cup. Again as bow, with the Australian Men's Eight crew, he won silver at the 1938 British Empire Games.

Thomas’ most notable coaching achievement was the Australian Eight’s Gold medal win at the 1950 British Empire Games in New Zealand.

== Rowing career ==
W.G. "Bill" Thomas attended Shore School, 1927-1934, where he took up rowing. He rowed No. 7 in the Shore 1st VIII that placed 2nd to Sydney Grammar School at the 1934 AAGPS "Head of the River". The technical disadvantages revealed during the difficult conditions of this race saw Shore's rowing teams change from "poppets" to "swivel row-locks".

On leaving school, Thomas joined the Mosman Rowing Club. Here Thomas built on his school successes. Firstly "in the Maiden and Junior divisions through to senior events and Championship Eights and Championship Fours of New South Wales" including the 1935 Stewards' Challenge Cup on the Yarra.

In 1936, Thomas was selected as bow for the NSW King's Cup crew who won the Australian Championship and Kings Cup. Again as bow, with the Australian Men's Eight crew, Thomas won silver at the 1938 British Empire Games Games.

== War service ==
In WWII Thomas served in the Australian Army and had the rank of Captain with the 2nd Field Regiment. Thomas was discharged at the war's end in 1945.

== Coaching ==
After the war, Thomas coached at Sydney Rowing Club. His first major coaching success came with the NSW Interstate crew winning the 1949 King’s Cup. Thomas’ coaching then saw the same crew win Gold at the 1950 Empire Games in New Zealand.

Thomas’ sporting and coaching interests extended to his participation in the "development of the first calibrated rowing ergometer at Sydney University".

Later, in 1951, Thomas coached the Shore G.P.S. VIII Crew to victory in that year's AAGPS "Head of the River" Regatta. Thomas was a popular coach with one crew member stating "Everything is due to Bill Thomas’s Brilliant coaching" after the win. Thomas would go on to coach 3 further successful Shore G.P.S Crews over the following four years.

Thomas died after a long illness on 25 August 1982, at the age of 67 years.

== Bibliography ==
- May, A. L (1970), Sydney rows; A Centennial History of the Sydney Rowing Club, Sydney Rowing Club, ISBN 0959939806
- Poke, Robin (2019), A history of Australian rowing. Volume 1: early settlement to pre-war success 1770-1939 / Robin Poke, Walla Walla Press, ISBN 9781876718312
- Poke, R. with Guerin, A. and Coe, C. (2021), Looking Back, Rating Hight: A History of Australian Rowing Vol.2 An Eara of International Prominence 1940-2020, Walla Walla Press, ISBN 978-1-876718-35-0
