= Elizabeth Kenny =

Australian nurse (1880–1952)

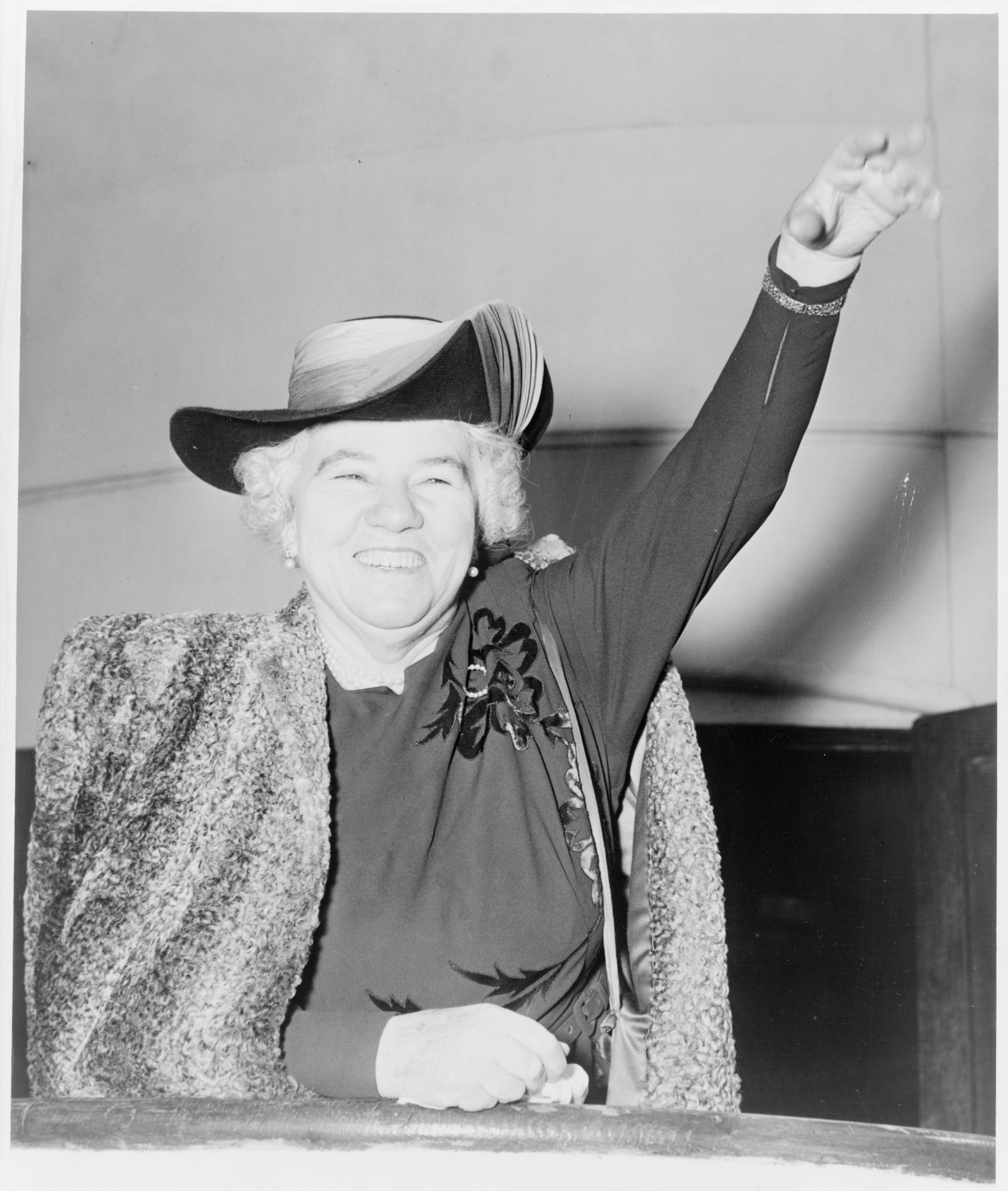
- Elizabeth Kenny in 1950
- Born: 20 September 1880; Warialda, Colony of New South Wales
- Died: 30 November 1952 (aged 72); Toowoomba, Queensland, Australia
- Other name: Lisa
- Citizenship: Australian
- Occupation: Nurse

Sister Elizabeth Kenny (20 September 1880 – 30 November 1952) was a self-trained Australian bush nurse who developed an novel approach to treating polio. Though controversial at the time, as it went against immobilisation recommendations, her principles of muscle rehabilitation became the foundation of physical therapy or physiotherapy in such cases. Her method, promoted internationally while working in Australia, Europe and the United States, differed from the conventional one of placing affected limbs in plaster casts. Instead, she applied hot compresses, followed by passive movement of the areas to reduce what she called "spasm". Even an initially hostile medical community "had to acknowledge" that Sister Elizabeth Kenny's polio treatment helped thousands of children all over the world.

Her life story was told in a 1946 film, Sister Kenny, where she was portrayed by Rosalind Russell, who was nominated for the Academy Award for Best Actress for her performance.

== Early life ==
Elizabeth Kenny was born in Warialda, New South Wales, on 20 September 1880, to the Australian-born Mary Kenny, née Moore, and Michael Kenny, a farmer from Ireland.

Called "Lisa" by her family, Kenny was home schooled by her mother, and only received a few years of formal education when living at Headington Hill, near Nobby. She said in Who's Who in Australia she had attended St Ursulas College near Guyra, but this has never been verified. At the age of 17, she broke her wrist in a fall from a horse. Her father took her to Aeneas McDonnell, a medical doctor in Toowoomba, where she remained during her convalescence. While there, Kenny studied McDonnell's anatomy books and model skeleton. This began a lifelong association with McDonnell, who became her mentor and advisor. Kenny later confirmed that she became interested in how muscles worked while convalescing from her accident. Instead of using a model skeleton, available for medical students only, she made her own. After her time with McDonnell, Kenny was certified by the Secretary of Public Instruction as a teacher of religious instruction and taught Sunday School in Rockfield. Having become a self-taught pianist, she listed herself as a "teacher of music" and did so a few hours a week.

In 1907, at the age of 27, Kenny returned to Guyra, New South Wales, first living with her grandmother and then with her cousin Minnie Bell. Whilst living with her cousin she had success as a broker of agricultural sales between Guyra farmers and northern markets in Brisbane. After that she worked in the kitchen in Scotia, a local midwife's cottage hospital and the local Dr. Harris gave her a letter of recommendation. With some savings from her brokerage work she paid a local tailor to make her a nurse's uniform. With that and the observations she had made at Scotia and under Dr Harris, she returned to Nobby to offer her services as a Medical and Surgical Nurse.

During this period of her life she used the title "nurse" - common for both formally and informally trained nurses at the time - based on her experience and a letter of recommendation from Dr Harris, which served as a relevant credential before registration was required. Kenny earned the title Sister while nursing on transport ships that carried soldiers to and from Australia and England during the First World War. In Britain and Commonwealth countries, Sister applies to senior more qualified nurse, one grade below "Matron".

== Work ==
Kenny returned to Nobby during 1911 after spending time in Walcha assisting her cousin after the birth of her son. Upon her return to Nobby, Kenny advertised her services as a Medical and Surgical Nurse, reaching her patients on foot or by horseback or buggy. Many authors describe Kenny as working as a Bush Nurse, but this is not a term she applied to herself. In July 1912 she opened a cottage hospital at Clifton which she named St. Canice's, where she provided convalescent and midwifery services, describing herself as Nurse Kenny, Certificated Medical, Surgical, and Midwifery. Such cottage hospitals were typically modest - often a few rooms in a converted house - and were a common way for nurses to providing nursing care in rural areas where main hospitals were scarce; for Clifton, the nearest main hospitals were Toowoomba and Warwick. In the Clifton district, nurses such as Nurse Dawes and Nurse Pengelly operated private hospitals in the same period.

At the time Kenny established St Canice's, Queensland was introducing new regulations governing nursing and private hospitals. Under the Queensland Health Act Amendment Act (1911), only a medical practitioner or registered nurse could register a private hospital, and a nurses' registration board was established with power to register qualified nurses. However, the Act contained a grandfather clause protecting nurses who held certificates of three years' training on 1 January 1912, and gave the Minister discretion to register nurses who had been employed in nursing during the three years preceding that date. Kenny had returned to Nobby during 1911 and advertised her services as a nurse, placing her within this protection. In addition, contemporary nursing journals noted that an amendment to the Act was before parliament to provide exemptions in remote districts where nurses might be unavailable. Historian Alexander Francis, writing in 1935, described the healthcare desert of rural Queensland: "In many places there was no doctor, no hospital, no chemist, no nurse, but a large cemetery".

In her 1943 autobiography she describes her first encounter with a patient who she treated for the disease that Dr McDonnell thought was infantile paralysis. The story was romanticized in the 1946 film Sister Kenny, featuring Rosalind Russell. In her autobiography Kenny wrote that she sought McDonnell's opinion. He wired back saying "treat them according to the symptoms as they present themselves." Sensing that their muscles were tight, she did what mothers around the world did: applied hot compresses made from woollen blankets to their legs. Kenny wrote that a little girl woke up much relieved and said, "Please, I want them rags that well my legs." Several children recovered with no serious after-effects. Recent scholarship has placed doubts on the veracity of Kenny's reporting of her first encounter with polio whilst working as a Nurse in Nobby or Clifton. Press reports from Australia in the 1930s quote Kenny as saying she developed her method while caring for meningitis patients on troopships during the First World War. Victor Cohn and Wade Alexander observed in their biographies of Kenny that she published several versions of the story during the early 1940s. Alexander claims the most dependable corroboration of Kenny's story is likely to be in a letter written in 1956 to Victor Cohn from the Toowoomba journalist T. Thompson, but Cohn did not give the letter sufficient credence to cite it in his biography. Recent research concludes that Kenny most likely developed her therapeutic techniques while treating paralysis patients during the 1920s.

=== World War I ===
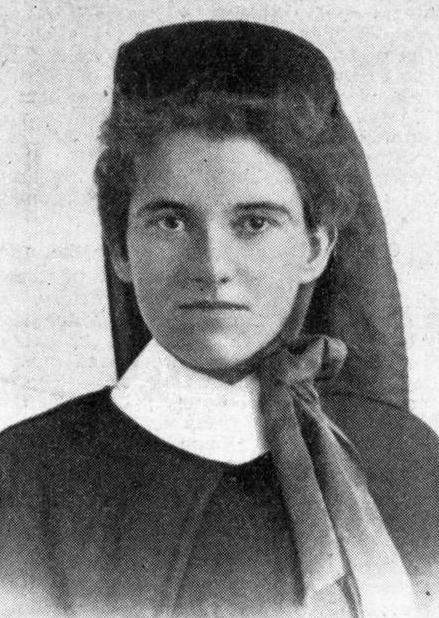
Nurse Elizabeth Kenny in August 1915

In May 1915 Kenny announced she was closing St Canice to join the War effort in Europe. She travelled at her own expense to London, where she hoped to serve as a nurse in the First World War. She was not eligible to serve with the Australian Army Nursing Service (AANS) as she was not a qualified nurse. She carried a letter of recommendation from Dr McDonnell, which Victor Cohn believed assisted her in being assigned as a Nurse on the crew of the HMAT Suevic. The Suevic was a "dark ship", so named because unlike hospital ships they were not painted white as protection under the Hague Convention. These transport ships were used to carry war goods and soldiers to the front; returning with wounded soldiers. Kenny's war service records state her date of appointment to the No. 1 Section, Special Transport Service, as the 28 July 1916. Kenny served on these missions throughout the war, making 8 round trips (plus one round the world via the Panama Canal). In 1917 she earned the title "Sister", which in the AANS is the equivalent of a First Lieutenant. Kenny used that title for the rest of her life and was criticised by some for doing so, but she was officially promoted to the rank during her wartime service. She claimed in her autobiography to have served for a few weeks as matron to a military hospital at Enoggera, near Brisbane, but an investigation in 1955 into Kenny's war service by the Officer in Charge, AIF Base Records, concluded there was no evidence of Kenny being attached to any military hospitals in Queensland during the war. Kenny's service records confirm that she was assigned temporarily on two occasions to the Australian Auxiliary Hospitals at Harefield Park and Southall while awaiting reassignment to her next voyage. It is likely that she observed advanced rehabilitation techniques whilst working in these hospitals. In 1919 Kenny was honourably discharged and awarded a pension

=== Return to Queensland ===
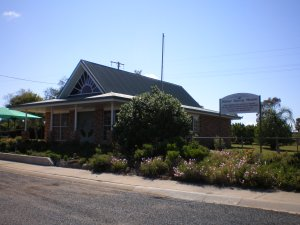
Sister Kenny Memorial/Museum, Nobby, Queensland

Following her discharge from the AANS, Kenny returned to Nobby to live with her mother. In June 1919, she volunteered to assist for two months at a temporary isolation hospital in Clifton, set up to care for victims of the 1918 flu pandemic. When the epidemic subsided, Kenny travelled to Guyra to recuperate. In October 1920, believing she was dying, she travelled to Europe to seek medical attention and visit Lourdes. Her ailments were probably psychosomatic as she remained fit and healthy until she developed Parkinson's Disease in her late 60s.

In May 1921, Kenny returned to Nobby. She was unable to work as a nurse because of her lack of qualifications but was active in the local Red Cross. In 1922, she was summoned to Guyra to care for Daphne Cregan, the daughter of Amelia and William Cregan, who was severely disabled with what was known then as cerebral diplegia. Daphne described her treatment as consisting of daily salt baths, sulphur baths, exercise performed in the bath, passive exercises on a table, massage, and the use of bark splints on her arms and legs. After 3 years of therapy, Daphne was able to walk with the aid of crutches and lead a productive life. Kenny's treatment of Daphne, plus her wartime nursing of the sick and wounded, was the foundation for her later work of rehabilitating polio victims.

In April 1925, Kenny was elected as the first president of the Nobby branch of the Queensland Country Women's Association. She also remained an active member of the local first aid service. In May 1926, she was called to provide first aid to Sylvia Kuhn, a young girl who had been injured in a farming accident. The child's injuries were sufficiently serious to warrant her transportation from Nobby to a hospital in Toowoomba. Witnesses confirm that Kenny improvised a rigid stretcher from a cupboard door. The improvised device protected the child's injured limbs and improved her comfort, thereby reducing the risk of shock during the journey. Kenny later improved and patented the stretcher for use by local ambulance services, and for the next four years marketed it as the Sylvia Stretcher, in Australia, Europe and the United States. She earned a substantial royalty from the sale of the stretcher, and is believed to have turned some of the profits over to the Country Women's Association. At that time Kenny, while travelling to sell the Stretcher, adopted eight-year-old Mary Stewart to be a companion for her elderly mother. Mary later became one of Sister Kenny's best "technicians".

=== Polio treatment ===
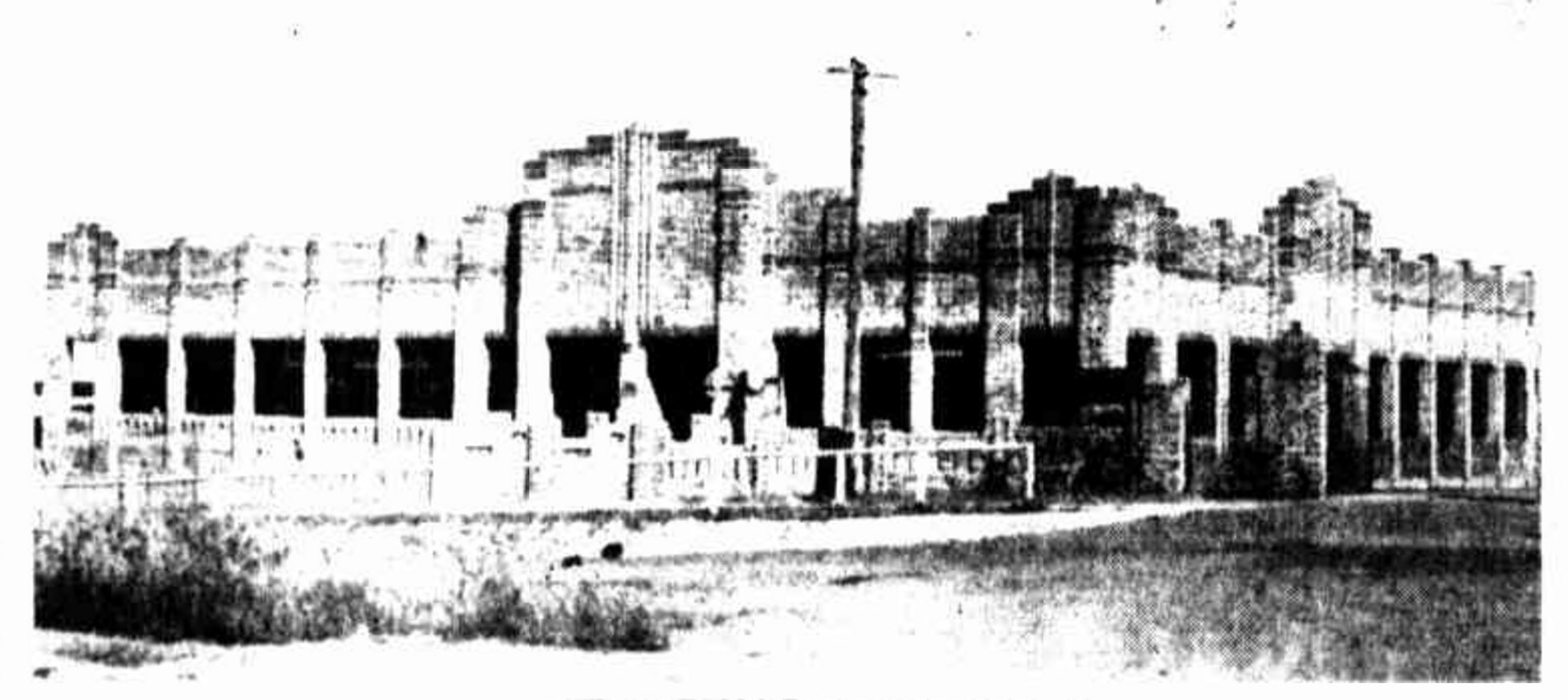
Sister Kenny Clinic, Rockhampton Hospital, 1939

As sales of the Sylvia Stretcher declined in the early 1930s, Kenny resumed her involvement with the CWA and campaigning for improved rural first-aid services. In May 1931, Kenny visited the Rollinson family who owned a station, Allandale, west of Townsville. Kenny had befriended the Rollinsons in London in 1929 while promoting her ambulance stretcher. The family asked Kenny to care for their niece Maude, who was disabled by polio. After 18 months of care under Kenny's direction, Maude recovered sufficiently to walk, marry and conceive a child. Kenny's use of hydrotherapy with Maude caught the attention of Ivy Brookes, a well-connected charitable worker.

In 1932, Queensland suffered its highest number of polio cases in 30 years. This outbreak focused public attention on the inadequacy of treatment for victims of paralysis. The following year, local people helped Kenny set up a rudimentary paralysis-treatment facility under canopies behind the Queens Hotel in Townsville. The makeshift clinic expanded as more parents brought their children to be treated by Kenny. In 1934, she enjoyed the support of Eleanor MacKinnon, a key figure in the local Red Cross, for a new clinic. In March 1934, the Queensland Government provided funds for a trial of Kenny's methods at the Townsville Clinic. An initial favourable evaluation of the clinic by Dr Rae Dungan was followed by a more critical report by Dr Raphael Cilento. Her success led to Kenny clinics being established in several Australian cities. Nothing remains of the Townsville Clinic or the George Street Clinic in Brisbane, but the Sister Kenny Clinic in the Outpatients Building of the Rockhampton Base Hospital is now listed on the Queensland Heritage Register.

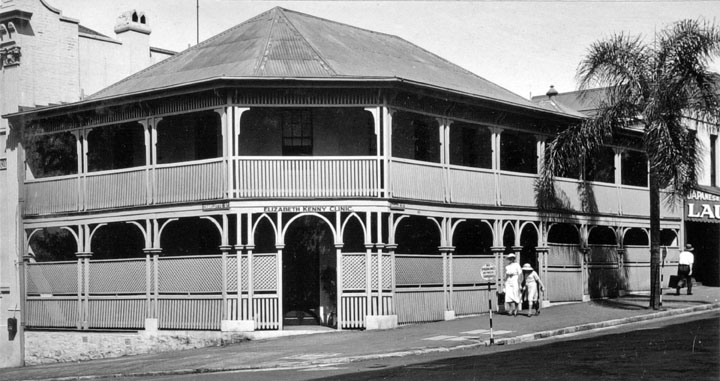
Elizabeth Kenny Clinic, corner of George and Charlotte Streets, Brisbane, 1938

Over the years, Kenny developed her clinical method and gained recognition in Australia. She was strongly opposed to immobilising children's bodies with plaster casts or braces. Kenny requested permission to treat children in the acute stage of the disease with hot compresses, but doctors would not allow that until after the acute stage of the disease, or until "tightness" (Kenny used the word "spasm" much later) subsided. She instituted a careful regimen of passive "exercises" designed to recall function in unaffected neural pathways, much as she had done with Maude Rollinson. In 1937, she published her first description of her therapeutic techniques. The book and her methods were dismissed as unoriginal by the Australian and British medical establishment. In 1941, she produced The Treatment of Infantile Paralysis in The Acute Stage, known as The Green Book. The broadest appraisal of her methods, The Kenny Concept of Infantile Paralysis And Its Treatment, appeared in collaboration with Dr John Pohl in 1943 and was known as The Red Book.

Between 1935 and 1940, Kenny travelled widely in Australia, helping to establish clinics, and made two trips to England, where she set up a treatment clinic in St Mary's Hospital near Carshalton. Kenny's success was controversial; many Australian doctors and the British Medical Association questioned her results and methodology. In 1934, Kenny made public claims about the success of her therapy that angered Raphael Cilento, who by now was the Director-General of Health in Queensland. Cilento's report in 1934 was cautiously supportive of Kenny's treatment of paralysis cases, but he felt Kenny was exaggerating the degree of rehabilitation produced by her methods. Kenny replied publicly, fiercely taking Cilento to task for his criticisms. This response caused contentious relations between Kenny, Cilento, the BMA and the Australian Massage Association (AMA). Between 1936 and 1938, a Queensland Government Royal Commission evaluated Kenny's work and published its Report of The Queensland Royal Commission on Modern Methods for the Treatment of Infantile Paralysis in 1938. Its most critical comment, on Kenny opposing the use of splints and plaster casts was: "The abandonment of immobilization is a grievous error and fraught with grave danger, especially in very young patients who cannot co-operate in re-education." However, it stated that her clinic, then in Brisbane, was "admirable". The Commissioners' strongest words were against the Queensland government, then funding Kenny's work, as her clinics were unsupervised by medical practitioners. The Queensland Government rejected the report and continued to support Kenny.

In 2009, during the Q150 celebrations of the institution of Queensland, the Kenny regimen for polio treatment was announced as an outstanding "innovation and invention".

=== In the United States ===
In 1940, the New South Wales government sent Kenny and her adopted daughter Mary, who had become an expert in Kenny's method, to America to present her clinical method for treating polio victims to doctors. After a sea journey from Sydney to Los Angeles and by rail to San Francisco, Chicago, New York City, back to Chicago and to the Mayo Clinic in Rochester, Minnesota, she was given a chance to show her work in Minneapolis, Minnesota. Doctors Miland Knapp and John Pohl, who headed polio treatment centres there, were impressed and told her she should stay. They found an apartment for Kenny and Mary; several years later, the city of Minneapolis gave them a house. The city was Kenny's base in America for 11 years. In a 1943 letter to the British Medical Journal, Kenny noted, "There have been upwards of 300 doctors attending the classes at the University of Minnesota."

During this time, several Kenny treatment centres were opened throughout the United States, the best-known being the Sister Kenny Institute in Minneapolis (opened 17 December 1942; now the Courage Kenny Rehabilitation Institute). Dr Knapp served as director of training at the Minneapolis Sister Kenny Institute after it opened in 1942, and was director of physical medicine and rehabilitation from 1948 to 1964 as well. There were also facilities at the New Jersey Medical Center and the Ruth Home in El Monte, California. She received honorary degrees from Rutgers University and the University of Rochester. She joined for lunch US President Roosevelt, whose paralytic illness was believed to be polio, discussing his treatment at Warm Springs. In 1951, Kenny topped Gallup's most admired man and woman poll as the only woman in the first ten years of the annual list to displace Eleanor Roosevelt from the top. The Sister Kenny Foundation was established in Minneapolis to support her and her work throughout the United States.

Some doctors changed their initial professional scepticism when they saw the effects Kenny's method had on her patients, both children and adults. Many magazines covered her work. In 1975 Victor Cohn wrote the first detailed biography of her life and work. During her first year in Minneapolis, the National Foundation for Infantile Paralysis (NFIP) paid her personal expenses and financed trials of her work. That support ceased, however, after a series of disagreements with the NFIP Director. Kenny was a determined and outspoken woman, which harmed her relations with the medical profession, but her method continued to be used and helped hundreds of people suffering from polio. After doctors on the east and west coasts dismissed her ideas, Sister Kenny came to Minnesota in 1940. She worked with doctors at the Mayo Clinic and in Minneapolis and opened the Sister Kenny Institute in 1942.

In recognition of her work, in February 1950 President Harry Truman signed a Congressional bill giving Kenny the right to enter and leave the US as she wished without a visa. This honour had only been granted once before, to the French Gilbert du Motier, Marquis de Lafayette, a leader in the American War of Independence.

== Final years and death ==
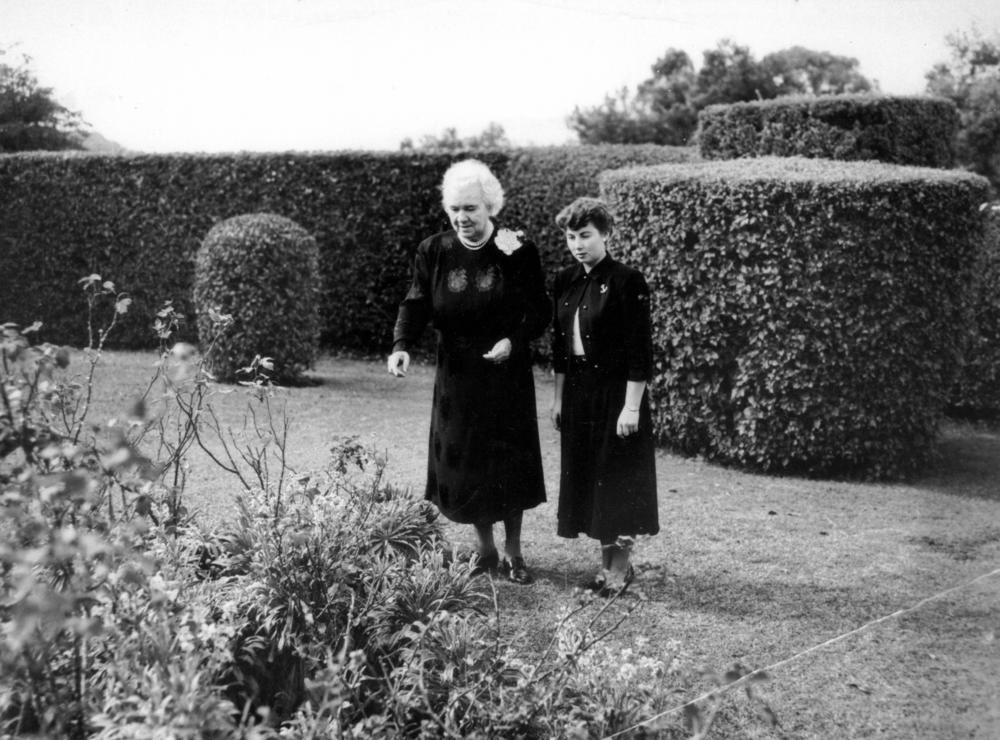
Sister Kenny (left) with her secretary in Kenny's garden in Toowoomba, 1952

Kenny filled her final years with extensive journeys in America, Europe and Australia in an effort to increase acceptance of her method. She tried, unsuccessfully, to have medical researchers agree with her that polio was a systemic disease. She attended the second International Congress about polio in Copenhagen. There, she was shunned and unable to participate. Suffering from Parkinson's disease, she stopped on her way home in Melbourne to meet privately with internationally respected virologist Sir Macfarlane Burnet. He wrote of the visit in his autobiography:

She had treated more cases than anyone else in the world – she gave the precise number, 7,828 – and no one else was in the position to speak with her authority. She is now almost forgotten by the world. But there was an air of greatness about her and I shall never forget that meeting.

In an attempt to save her life from cerebral thrombosis, Irving Innerfield of New York sent his experimental drug based on the enzyme trypsin by air mail to Brisbane. It was rushed by car to Toowoomba and administered on 29 November 1952, but her doctor found Kenny too close to death to benefit and she died the following day.

Kenny's funeral on 1 December 1952 at Neil Street Methodist Church in Toowoomba was recorded for transmission in other parts of Australia and in the United States. The cortège to Nobby Cemetery was one of the largest seen in Toowoomba. Kenny was buried there beside her mother.

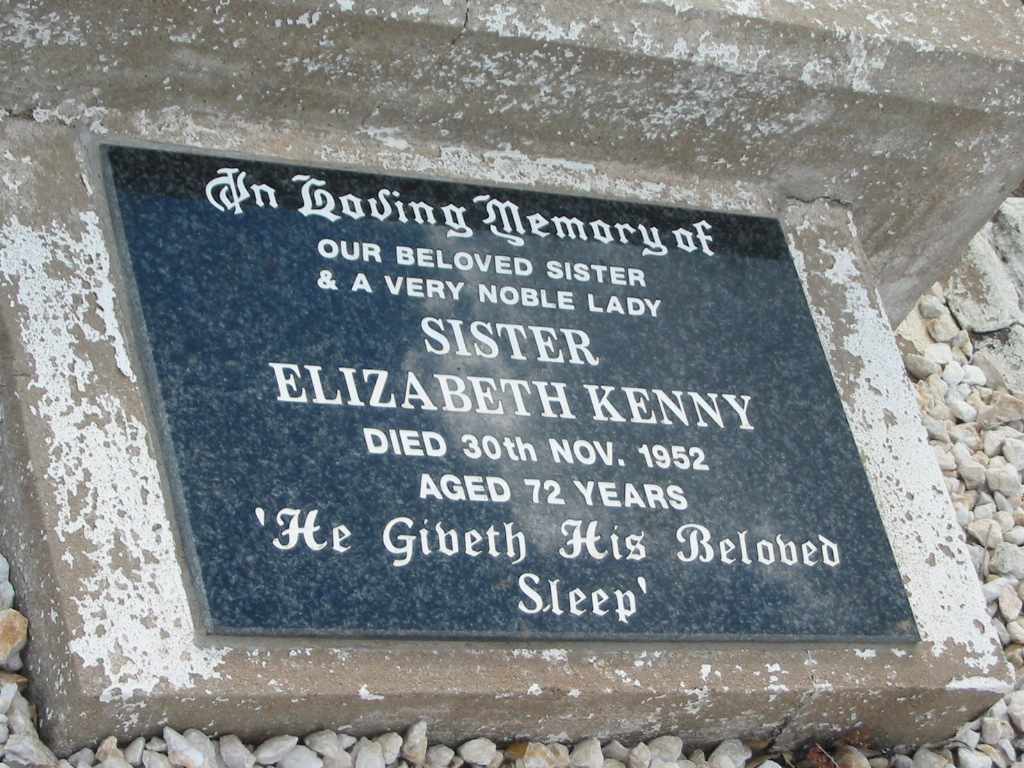
Headstone in Nobby cemetery

== Legacy ==
Between 1934 and her death in 1952, Kenny and her associates cared for thousands of patients, including polio victims throughout the world. Their testimony to Sister Kenny's help is part of her legacy, as is The Kenny Concept of Infantile Paralysis, and Its Treatment, known as the "Red Book".

A Sister Kenny Memorial House was opened in Nobby on 5 October 1997 by Prof John Pearn. This contains many artifacts from Kenny's life and a collection of documents from her private correspondence, papers and newspaper clippings. In Toowoomba, the Sister Elizabeth Kenny Memorial Fund provides scholarships to students attending the University of Southern Queensland who dedicate themselves to work in rural and remote areas of Australia. In Townsville, her life was marked in 1949 by the unveiling of a Sister Kenny Memorial and Children's Playground.

Kenny was posthumously inducted onto the Victorian Honour Roll of Women in 2001.

== Bibliography ==
- Elizabeth Kenny, Infantile Paralysis and Cerebral Diplegia: Method of Restoration of Function (Sydney: Angus and Robertson, 1937)
- Elizabeth Kenny, The Treatment of Infantile Paralysis in the Acute Stage (Minneapolis–St. Paul, Bruce Publishing Co. 1941)
- Elizabeth Kenny, My Battle and Victory: History of The Discovery of Poliomyelitis as a Systemic Disease (London: Robert Hale, 1955)
- Martha Ostenso and Elizabeth Kenny, And They Shall Walk (Bruce Publishing Co, Minneapolis-St Paul 1943)
- John Pohl, MD, and Elizabeth Kenny, The Kenny Concept of Infantile Paralysis and Its Treatment (St. Paul: Bruce Pub. Co. 1943)
- Naomi Rogers, Polio Wars: Sister Kenny and The Golden Age of American Medicine (Oxford University Press, N.Y. 2014)
- Wade Alexander, Sister Elizabeth Kenny: Maverick Heroine of The Polio Treatment Controversy, (Greystone Press, San Luis Obispo CA 2012). Note: This is an unredacted edition which includes content not in the Outback Press/CQU 2003 Edition which is out of print. The book is now published by the Sister Kenny Memorial House in Nobby QLD, AU. The Greystone 2012 Edition is available in an electronic version from the author.
