= Eleanor MacKinnon =

Red Cross leader (1871–1936) in Australia

Eleanor MacKinnon OBE
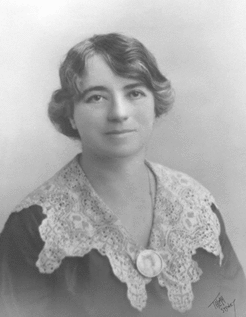
- Born: Eleanor Vokes Irby Addison; February 8, 1871; Tenterfield
- Died: January 31, 1936 (aged 64); Royal North Shore Hospital
- Education: Sydney Girls High School
- Known for: leading figure in the Red Cross and founder of the Junior Red Cross

Eleanor MacKinnon born Eleanor Vokes Addison aka Mrs. R. R. S. Mackinnon OBE (February 8, 1871 – January 31, 1936) was an Australian Red Cross leader credited with founding the Junior Red Cross.

== Life ==
MacKinnon was born in Tenterfield in 1871. She attended Sydney Girls High School. Notable fellow students at the school were Louise Mack and Ethel Turner.

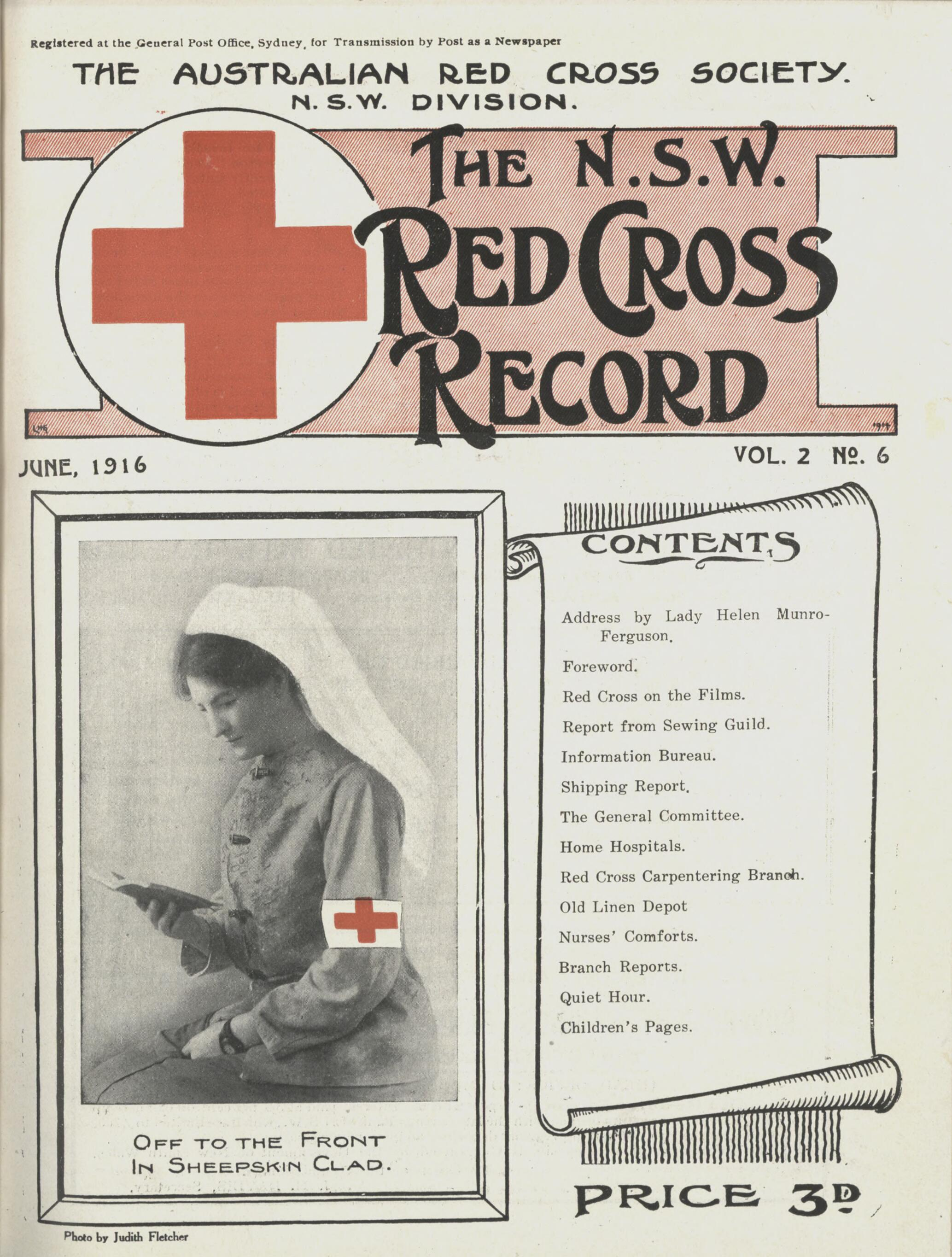
NSW Red Cross Record June 1916

She studied under the Australian landscape artist Lister Lister but she became known by her association with charitable groups where she was frequently on the committee. She was opposed to cruelty to animals and when the King Edward's Dogs' Home started she was its president. In 1909 she became the President of the Women's Liberal (Reform) League of New South Wales and she also served on the board of the Royal Alexandra Hospital for Children.

MacKinnon became the honorary secretary of the State' branch of the British Red Cross Society in 1914. She founded a magazine titled the "NSW Red Cross Record" in 1915 which she edited. The magazine gathered advertising and in 1916 it was selling for thruppence a copy.

In April 1915, Australian troops first saw action when they landed at Gallipoli. Thomas Allwright Dibbs was the manager of the Commercial Banking Company of Sydney who owned a number of properties. Dibbs donated his home, Graythwaite, to the state as a convalescent home for soldiers returning from the front. Dibbs presented the deeds of Graythwaite to the Premier of New South Wales who handed the property on to the NSW branch of the Red Cross. MacKinnon became a committee member of the convalescent home.

In October 1918 MacKinnon was awarded the Order of the British Empire for her work with the Red Cross Society.

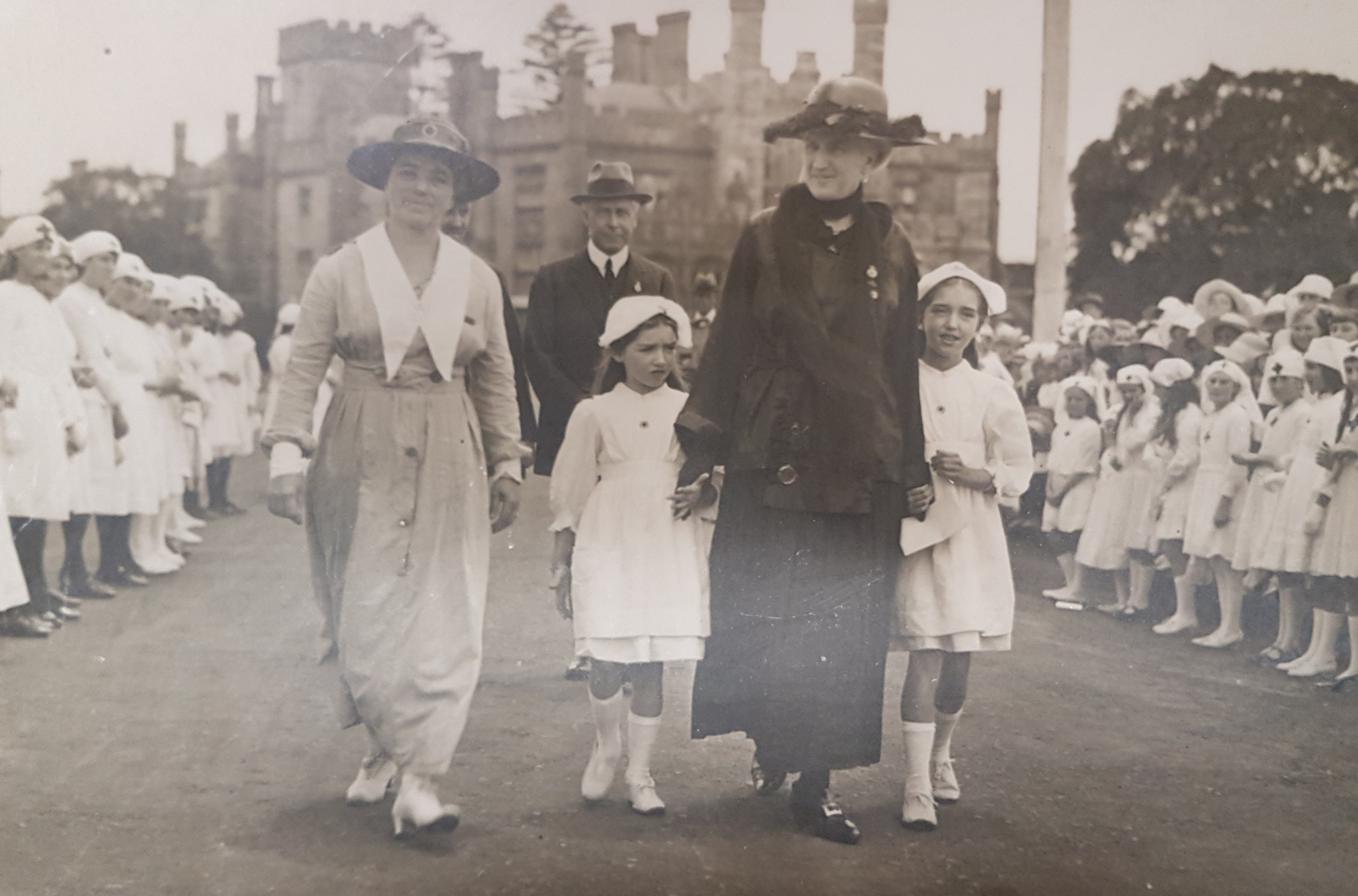
MacKinnon and Lady Edeline Strickland and the Junior Red Cross at Government House in Sydney in about 1918

In 1925, MacKinnon was the substiute delegate for the sixth general assembly of the League of Nations.

She gave her support to self trained nurse Elizabeth Kenny who was caring for polio patients in Queensland using physiotherapy. In March 1934 the Queensland Government provided funds for a trial of Kenny's controversial methods at her Townsville Clinic.

== Death and legacy ==
MacKinnon died in Royal North Shore Hospital in 1936. She was survived by her two sons.

The Eleanor MacKinnon Memorial Home in Cronulla, New South Wales was established in 1951 and named in her honour. It closed in 1997.

== Private life ==
She married on 16 September 1896 a physician named Dr Roger Robert Steel MacKinnon. She would sometimes use the name "Mrs R R S MacKinnon". They had two children who were born at their home called Warialda.
