= A Peculiar People =

- Author: Rodney Clapp
- Subject: Ecclesiology; culture
- Publisher: InterVarsity Press
- Publication date: November 1996
- Pages: 251
- ISBN: 978-0-8308-1990-4
- Dewey Decimal: 262 20
- LC Class: BV600.2 .C554 1996

A Peculiar People: The Church as Culture in a Post-Christian Society is a book by Rodney Clapp discussing the Christian church's witness in contemporary culture. It was published in 1996 by InterVarsity Press.

In the book Clapp explores the changing role of the Christian church in light of a changing North American culture. Clapp argues against a church that has been co-opted by the larger culture. As such he argues that the church should stand as a unique or peculiar culture that can then critique the larger culture.

A contingent aspect of this that Clapp argues for is the notion that the church needs to shift its understand of itself from a collection of individuals each with their own understanding, ideas, and values. For the church to be culture it must be understood as community.

Clapp argues that the church should be transformative in the world via living as an alternative culture rather than through political means. In essence his position is that by living a unique form of life in the world the church can bear witness to another way, and in bearing witness it can bring positive change to the larger culture.
