= Espnstar.com =

Sports news website

espnstar.com
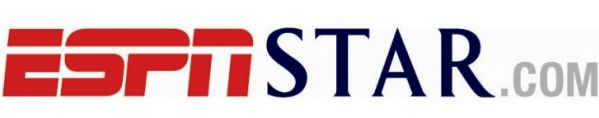

- The home page for espnstar.com from July 13, 2011
- Website type: News website
- Available in: English
- Owner: ESPN Star Sports
- Creator: ESPN Star Sports
- Website: www.espnstar.com
- Commercial: Yes
- Registration: None

espnstar.com was a sports news website operated by ESPN Star Sports, a joint venture between ESPN International and STAR TV/Fox International Channels that broadcasts to audiences in China, Hong Kong, Taiwan, India and Southeast Asia. In addition to news, it contained columns and blogs by the network's leading personalities. In 2013, approximately 59 percent of visitors to espnstar.com come from India.

As of 2020, the site was no longer linked to ESPN Star Sports, and instead redirected to an Indonesian, sports blog.
