= William Owen (judge, born 1899) =

Australian judge (1899–1972)

The Right Honourable Sir William Owen KBE QC

Justice of the High Court of Australia
- In office 22 September 1961 – 31 March 1972
- Nominated by: Robert Menzies
- Preceded by: Sir Wilfred Fullagar
- Succeeded by: Sir Anthony Mason

Personal details
- Born: 21 November 1899 Sydney, New South Wales, Australia
- Died: 31 March 1972 (aged 72) St Luke's Hospital, Darlinghurst, Sydney, NSW, Australia

Sir William Francis Langer Owen (21 November 1899 – 31 March 1972) was an Australian judge who served as a Justice of the High Court of Australia from 1961 until his death in 1972.

== Early life ==
Owen was born in 1899 in Sydney, New South Wales, the son of Sir Langer Owen (1862–1935). He was educated at Sydney Church of England Grammar School, where he was in the school's cadet unit.

== Military service ==
During World War I, from 1915 to 1919, Owen served in the First Australian Imperial Force. Owen enlisted on 31 December 1915, and was assigned as a sapper in the 9th Field Company Engineers, part of the Australian 3rd Division. Owen was wounded in action on 20 September 1917, during the Battle of Menin Road, part of the Battle of Passchendaele . Owen returned to service on 7 October 1917. He was wounded a second time at the Battle of the Somme on 23 May 1918, and was evacuated to a military hospital in Orpington, United Kingdom. On 29 August he was reassigned to the Training Depot of the Australian Flying Corps. By the end of the war, Owen had been promoted to the rank of Lieutenant.

== Legal and judicial career ==
After returning to Australia, Owen completed the bar examinations and was admitted to the New South Wales Bar in 1923. In 1935, Owen was made a King's Counsel.

=== New South Wales Supreme Court ===
In 1936, Owen served as an Acting Judge of the Supreme Court of New South Wales, and in 1937 was made a full judge. In the late 1940s, Owen's associate was Laurence Street, a future Chief Justice of New South Wales. In 1942, he succeeded Owen Dixon as chair of the Central Wool Committee, and in 1945 was the Australian delegate to the Imperial Wool Conference.

From 1954 to 1955, Owen chaired the Royal Commission on Espionage, the Royal Commission which resulted from the infamous Petrov Affair.

One of Owen's best known judgments was in the case of Associated Dominions Assurance Society Pty Ltd v John Fairfax & Sons Pty Ltd (1955) 72 WN (NSW), where he held what constitutes a "fishing expedition" in the law.

=== High Court of Australia ===
In 1957 Owen was made a Knight Commander of the Order of the British Empire, and on 22 September 1961 he was appointed to the bench of the High Court, at the age of 61 and ten months. He remained the oldest person ever appointed to the High Court until the 2015 appointment of Justice Geoffrey Nettle. Owen was elevated to the Judicial Committee of the Privy Council in 1963.

He died on 31 March 1972 (aged 72) at St Luke's Hospital, Darlinghurst, Sydney, and was cremated. His wife and daughter survived him.
