= Leslie Melville =

Australian economist, academic and public servant

Sir Leslie Melville KBE
- Born: Leslie Galfreid Melville; 26 March 1902; Sydney, New South Wales
- Died: 30 April 2002 (aged 100); Canberra, Australian Capital Territory
- Education: Sydney Church of England Grammar School
- Alma mater: University of Sydney
- Known for: Helped to form Australia's central banking system
- Spouse: Mary Scales
- Children: Galfrid Leslie ("Tig") Melville; Anthony Melville
- Scientific career
- Fields: Economics
- Workplaces: University of Adelaide; Commonwealth Bank; Australian National University

Sir Leslie Galfreid Melville KBE (26 March 1902 – 30 April 2002) was an Australian economist, academic and public servant. He helped form Australia's central banking system and gave his voice in international economic forums in the years following World War II. He also played an important role in the early years of the Australian National University, serving as its Vice-Chancellor between 1953 and 1960.

== Early years and background ==
Leslie Melville was born in Sydney in 1902. His father Richard Ernest Melville was of Irish stock, and his mother Lillian Evelyn née Thatcher had English forebears. During World War I, his father lost his job as a bank manager and then invested in a project that failed, bringing the family into severe financial difficulty. This experience helped formulate Leslie's outlook and attitudes to economic matters generally. He won a scholarship to Sydney Church of England Grammar School (Shore), where he topped the state in mathematics, and was known as the "Isaac Newton of Shore".

While studying engineering at the University of Sydney, he diverged into actuarial studies and then joined the NSW Superannuation Fund. Working full-time meant he could study only subjects he could take at evenings, so he chose economics.

== Career in economics ==
In 1924, aged only 22, he was appointed Public Actuary for South Australia. In this role he was often called upon to advise the government on economic issues generally.

In 1928 he gave evidence on Commonwealth-State economic and financial matters before the Royal Commission on the Australian Constitution, and again in 1929 before the Royal Commission on the Finances of South Australia. In 1929, aged only 27, Melville became the Foundation Professor of Economics at the University of Adelaide. In 1930 he became Chief Economic Adviser to the Commonwealth Bank, a role he held for 23 years. In this role he was at the forefront of the formulation of Australia's policies to combat the Great Depression.

Melville represented Australia at the 1932 Ottawa Imperial Trade Conference, after the Prime Minister Joseph Lyons had revoked Sir Robert Gibson's directive for him not to attend. Melville also attended the World Economic Conference in London in 1933.

He became a prolific writer on economic matters, contributing greatly to economic debate both at home and internationally. His economic thinking was often out of kilter with his colleagues: he advocated exchange rate fluidity when most were arguing for the status quo. He presented his ideas forcefully at the 1936-37 Royal Commission on Banking and Monetary Systems. During World War II, he helped design Australia's war economy.

In 1944 Melville led the Australian delegation to the Bretton Woods Conference, which laid the foundations for the World Bank and the International Monetary Fund (IMF). John Maynard Keynes was very impressed with Melville; and he said that Melville:

... upheld the dignity and integrity of Australia with the most marked success ... He handled himself most impressively, was clear, cogent and never unreasonable, put his point forcibly yet moderately, yet achieved ... as much as was humanly possible to move matters in the direction he desired. He had quite a difficult task and accomplished it supremely well.

In 1950 Melville became Australia's Executive Director of both the World Bank and the IMF.

== Academic career ==
From 1953 to 1960 he was Vice-Chancellor of the Australian National University (ANU). After his retirement, he remained an honorary fellow of the ANU in the Department of Economics at the Research School of Pacific and Asian Studies (RSPAS).

== Government appointments ==
When H. C. Coombs was appointed Governor of the Reserve Bank of Australia, he paid tribute to Melville by advising the government and others that the best man for the job had been overlooked. Melville nevertheless served three terms as a Board Member of the Reserve Bank. When Melville retired, Coombs wrote to him: In the years you were with the Bank, you made a contribution to the theory and practice of central banking which is without equal in the world.

In 1960 he became Chairman of the Tariff Board, but clashed repeatedly with the Trade Minister, John McEwen, and he resigned in 1962. In 1966 Melville was appointed Chairman of the Commonwealth Grants Commission, remaining in this post until 1974.

== Personal life ==
In 1925 Melville married Mary Scales in Adelaide. They had two sons, Galfrid (Tig) and Anthony. Sir Leslie Melville celebrated his 100th birthday on 26 March 2002 at Canberra's Commonwealth Club, which he had helped found. He died a month later, on 30 April 2002. At the time of his death, he was survived by his son Anthony, three grandchildren (Jennifer, Elizabeth and Alice) and five great-grandchildren (Michael Kalaf, Henry Kalaf, William Kalaf, Patrick O'Connell and Sophie O'Connell).

His close friend Professor Heinz Arndt was to deliver Melville's eulogy, but he died in a car accident while on the way to the funeral.

== Honours ==
In the 1953 New Year's Honours, Melville was appointed a Commander of the Order of the British Empire (CBE) for his services to the Commonwealth Bank. In the 1957 New Year's Honours, he was appointed a Knight Commander of the Order (KBE).

The ANU celebrated his centenary by dedicating an annual lecture series in his name, the Sir Leslie Melville Lecture. The inaugural address, given on 22 March 2002, a few days before his 100th birthday, was delivered by Ian Macfarlane, then Governor of the Reserve Bank.

Melville Hall and Melville Place at the ANU are named in honour of Sir Leslie.

Academic offices
Preceded by Sir Douglas Copland	2nd Vice-Chancellor of the Australian National University; 1953–1960	Succeeded by Sir Leonard Huxley
Government offices
Preceded by	Chairman of the Commonwealth Grants Commission; 1966–1974	Succeeded by
