= Thomas Allwright Dibbs =

Australian banker

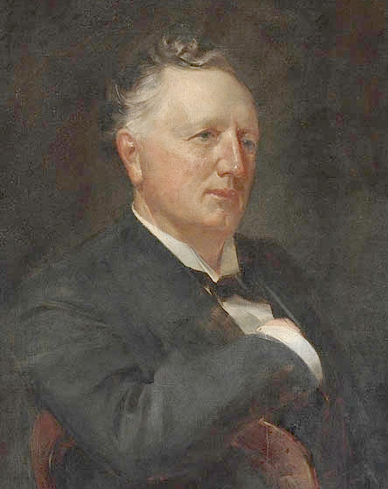
Sir Thomas Allwright Dibbs, about 1897.

Thomas Allwright Dibbs (1 November 1833 – 18 March 1923) was an Australian banker.
