= Jim's Mowing =

Lawn care service franchise

Jim's Group
- Founder: Jim Penman
- Headquarters: Australia
- Areas served: Australia, New Zealand, United Kingdom & Canada
- Key people: Jim Penman (CEO)
- Owner: Jim's Group

Jim's Mowing is an Australian lawn care service franchise which was founded in 1982 by Jim Penman, who initially launched it as a part-time gardening business while he was completing his PhD in history. He remains CEO of the group and actively involved in day-to-day operations. The business was run independently until 1989, when it became a franchise, which can now be found in four countries, with 5,000 total franchisees.

After launching the Jim's Mowing franchise in 1989, further divisions followed. The second division was Jim's Cleaning, and since then the franchise model has been adapted to almost 50 different service industries (including plumbing, fencing, roofing, and Jim's Mobile Tyres) and multiple countries (including the United Kingdom, New Zealand, and Canada).

In 2019, Jim's Group is the largest home-service franchise in Australia. It has an annual turnover of over $500 million, approximately 4,000 franchises and about 35,000 customers.

== History ==
In 1982, Jim Penman started the company with $24 of capital in order to fund his research into biohistory after his PhD thesis was initially rejected.

In 1989, Jim's Group switched to a franchise model.

In 2009, there was a major disruption from the franchisees when fees were raised and Jim Penman was almost voted out.

In 2010, master franchisors held a "referendum" asking for Penman to stand down because of concerns with his leadership style, breaches of contract, and steep fee hikes. Although the referendum followed the procedures in the operation manual, Jim advised he could not be stood down and that only he could run the company; eventually, negotiations occurred which reached agreement on the fee and master franchise issues. A number of concerns about Penman were also raised by disgruntled franchisees including that "he runs the whole business as though he owns every part of it", changes had reduced the value of their investment, and litigation.

In 2012, there was an unsuccessful bid for $10 million in funding to expedite expansion including a float on the ASX, which has not since been realised.

In 2018, the Jim's Group launched the Jim's Plus initiative, now known as Bizza. Every year, Jim’s turns away around 250,000 customers because they don’t have enough franchisees to service the demand. Bizza offers these leads on a success fee basis to non-Jim's franchisees.

In 2022, Jim's Group received more than 300,000 leads that were unable to be serviced.

In 2024, Jim’s Mowing entered a partnership with a local indoor cricket team known as Jim’s Indoor Cricket.

== Foothills Conference Centre and Headquarters ==
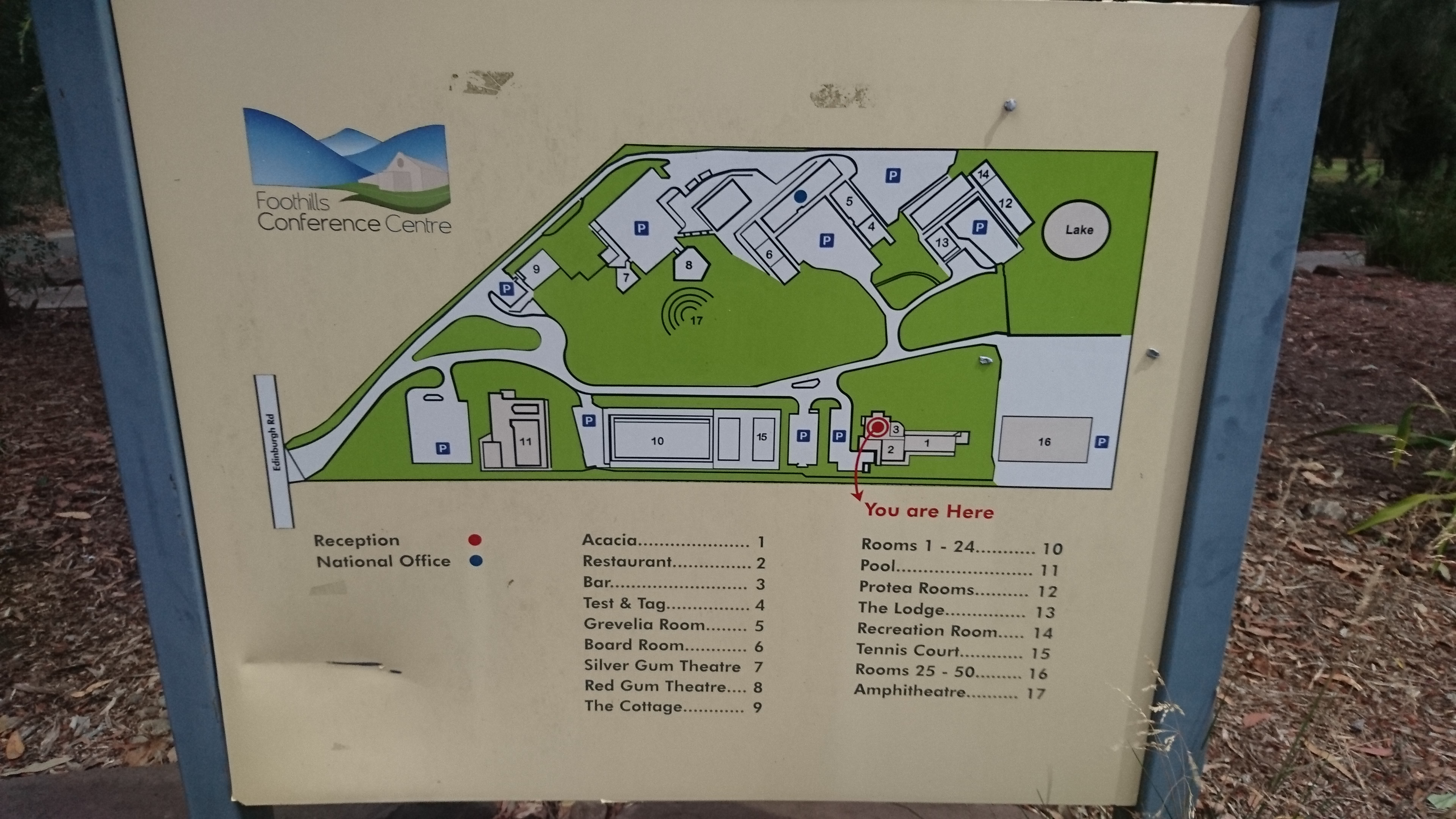
Jim's Mowing (Group) - headquarters and Foothills Conference Centre

Jim's established a conference centre for training franchisees at Mooroolbark, Victoria. This also serves as the group headquarters, and includes a call centre. Several lodges of various sizes have generously appointed ensuite bedrooms equivalent to hotel rooms, surrounding a multi room conference venue with restaurant and bar. The hotel rooms are also available to the public on a space available basis.
