= Sydney Church of England Grammar School =

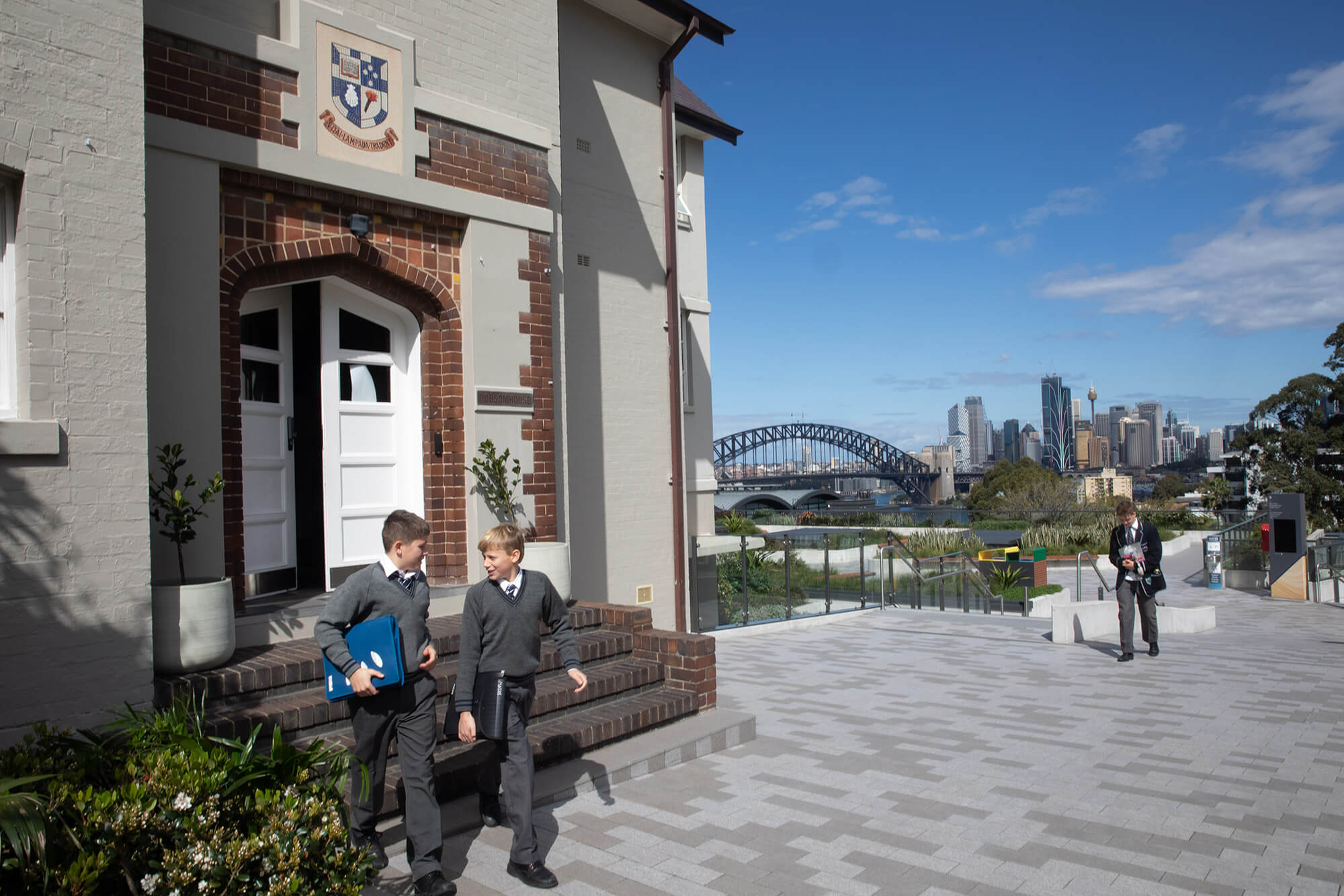

Location
- North Sydney and Northbridge, Lower North Shore, Sydney, New South Wales; Australia; 33°50′22″S 151°12′19″E

Information
- Other names: SHORE; Shore School
- Type: Independent single-sex and co-educational early learning, primary and secondary day and boarding school
- Motto: Latin: Vitai Lampada Tradunt (Lucretius, De Rerum Natura) (They hand on the torch of life)
- Religious affiliation: Anglican Diocese of Sydney
- Denomination: Anglicanism
- Established: 1889; 137 years ago
- Founder: The Rev. Alfred Barry
- Sister school: SCEGGS Darlinghurst
- Educational authority: New South Wales Education Standards Authority
- Chair: Mr Rob Clarke
- Headmaster: Dr Peter Miller
- Chaplain: Rev Anthony Benn
- Years: Early Learning Centre (ELC) and K–12
- Gender: Co-educational (Girls and boys) ELC to Year Year 2; Single-sex education (Boys) (Year 3 to Year 12)
- Enrolment: ~1,700 (K–12)
- Education system: HSC and NAPLAN
- Campuses: Northbridge: Early learning to Year 2; North Sydney: Year 3 to Year 12
- Campus type: Urban: North Sydney; Suburban: Northbridge
- Colours: Navy blue and white
- Athletics: Athletic Association of the Great Public Schools of New South Wales
- Affiliations: Association of Heads of Independent Schools of Australia; Junior School Heads Association of Australia; Australian Boarding Schools' Association; Headmasters' and Headmistresses' Conference
- Alumni: Shore Old Boys
- Website: shore.nsw.edu.au

The Sydney Church of England Grammar School (commonly known as Shore or Shore School) is an independent Anglican school for boys located on Sydney's Lower North Shore, New South Wales, Australia. The school operates across two campuses, offering an early learning centre (ELC), primary and secondary education. The North Sydney campus has four boarding houses for Year 7-12 students, offering weekday and full-time boarding.

Established in 1889 by the Church of England, Shore has a non-selective enrolment policy and serves approximately 1,700 students from ELC to Year 12, including 200 boarders from Year 7 onwards. A separate campus in Northbridge provides co-educational classes from ELC to Year 2.

Shore is a member of the Association of Heads of Independent Schools of Australia (AHISA), the Junior School Heads Association of Australia (JSHAA), the Australian Boarding Schools' Association (ABSA), the Headmasters' and Headmistresses' Conference (HMC), and is a founding member of the Athletic Association of the Great Public Schools of New South Wales (AAGPS).

== History ==
The Sydney Church of England Grammar School was founded on 4 May 1889, and was the initiative of Bishop Alfred Barry of the Sydney Diocese of the Church of England, after the closing of the St James School in 1886. The site of the school was chosen by the first headmaster to be the Victorian mansion of the famed gold prospector Bernhardt Holtermann, a German immigrant who is associated with the discovery of the Holtermann Nugget in the Australian gold fields. He used his newfound wealth to build a magnificent home in North Sydney, which is now a boarding house of Shore. His sons were among the first students enrolled at Shore.

The St. James' School Compensation Trust Act (1886) provided for the foundation of:

A school of the highest type, including departments of education for all classes of the community, in which the teaching shall be throughout in accordance with the principles of the Church of England, and which shall be placed under the direction of a governing body of clergy and laity to be elected by the Synod, the Bishop of the Diocese being the ex-officio president.

The school’s colours and diagonal stripes are drawn from Christ's College, Cambridge, where the founding headmaster studied. The school crest features symbols representing its values and affiliations: the Bible and the Southern Cross appear on the top row, alongside a shell, symbolising a connection to St. James' School, and a torch. The school motto is displayed beneath these elements. Moreover, the boater, a piece of uniform which has become closely associated with the school, was first encouraged to be worn in 1912, before becoming compulsory in 1924.

The school has two official names: the Sydney Church of England Grammar School and the Shore School, although it is more commonly known as the latter. The name 'Shore' was formally adopted in the early 1990s to distinguish it from other institutions. This change was partially driven by the difficulty of chanting 'Grammar' at sports events, as Sydney Grammar School students were already using the term, and to avoid confusion with SCEGGS (Sydney Church of England Girls' Grammar School), Shore's sister school. The name 'Shore' also reflects the school’s location in Sydney’s North Shore region.

== Campuses ==
The Sydney Church of England Grammar School is situated on two campuses:

- North Sydney (including land formerly belonging to Graythwaite) (8 ha)
- Northbridge (9 ha) – ELC to Year 2 and sports grounds

=== North Sydney ===
In the senior school, in addition to the administrative centres and classroom blocks there are:

- War Memorial Chapel (1915)
- The War Memorial Hall (1953)
- Ken and Joan Smith Auditorium (1994)
- BH Travers Centre, including the Boer War Memorial Library and Basketball Courts (2000)
- The Benefactors Building, including the Bob Gowing Museum incorporating the school archives, mainly of the accomplishments of previous headmasters to school academic and extra-curricular achievement.
- The Centenary Building, including the art department
- Sporting facilities, including one oval, cricket nets and tennis courts. In 2016, the school announced plans for an updated gym, squash courts, basketball court, an indoor/outdoor 50 metre pool and new classrooms as a part of the Shore Physical Education Centre. Construction began early 2018 and has been completed.

The Preparatory School, originally constructed in 1926, was completely renovated in March 2006.

=== Northbridge ===
An Early Learning Centre (ELC) for boys and girls in the two years prior to starting Kindergarten, as well as a Kindergarten to Year 2 learning facility for boys and girls, was opened at the Northbridge campus in 2003. With Long Day Care facilities, the ELC is open 48 weeks per year.

The school's main sports facility is also at Northbridge, on land bought in 1916. The school was given a choice of either buying the neighbouring Graythwaite property (the former home of Thomas Allwright Dibbs), or the land at Northbridge. The school chose the land at Northbridge as playing fields, of which the school was in desperate need. This campus now features six full-sized ovals, tennis courts, pavilions and dressing rooms. The grounds were opened in 1919 as a memorial to the 880 old boys who served, and the 122 who died in the Great War.

The grandstand and associated facilities were redeveloped in 2008 (officially opened on 11 November 2008) at a cost of $9 million .

== Curriculum ==
=== Subjects ===
Shore offers a wide variety of subjects. Traditionally the school is most successful in Business studies and Economics, producing 6 state rankings in the past 4 years including first in Business Studies in 2020. Shore has also produced strong performances in Mathematics - producing eighth in 2021, fifth in 2018 and third in 2017 in the Extension 1 course, and second and sixth in 2022 and first in 2017 in the Extension 2 course, in addition to Latin, where the school has produced 6 state rankings since 2016.

=== Rankings ===
Year	Rank	Proportion of Band 6 results	Highest ATAR	Proportion of ATARs above 90
2011	35	30%	99.95	42%
2012	19	37.4%	99.95	59%
2013	26	33.3%	99.95 (2)	53%
2014	27	34.5%	99.85	48%
2015	34	30.6%	99.85 (2)	45%
2016	26	35.3%	99.95	51%
2017	34	31.5%	99.95 (2)	49%
2018	22	35.9%	99.90	55%
2019	37	30.5%	99.95	90.10 median (exact % not given)
2020	40	28.8%	99.95	89.05 median (exact % not given)
2021	54	25.4%	99.90	88.05 median (exact % not given)
2022	37	29.0%	99.95	53% (90.35 median)
2023	24	37.4%	99.90 (3)	56% (91.90 median)
2024	26	39.3%	99.95 (2)	50% (91.80 median)
2025	27	37.6%	99.90	52% (91.13 median)

== Co-Curricular ==
=== Sport ===
Shore students may participate in a variety of sports, mainly within the GPS competition. Sports include rugby union, football, Australian Rules, rowing, cricket, tennis, golf, taekwondo, basketball, cross country running, athletics, shooting, surf lifesaving, and snowsports.

Until the arrival of Headmaster R.A.I. Grant (1984–2002), the choice of sports available to students was very limited. For example, during the winter months, there was only rugby union unless a medical exemption was available. That changed after 1984, with sports such as tennis and soccer being made available to all students.

The school's boatshed and pontoon for its rowing club is at Gladesville on the north shore of Sydney's Parramatta River. Shore was the third Sydney school to take to the water (after Sydney Grammar and Riverview) and has been rowing in the GPS competition since the late 1890s, to great result.

=== Performing arts ===
Shore has a performing arts program, including music Ensembles and drama productions. Music ensembles include two concert bands, two stage bands, an orchestra, three string groups and the Shore Chapel Choir, as well as a number of other smaller ensembles. The Shore Performing Arts Centre has a proscenium arch theatre with 500 seats as well as a hydraulic orchestra pit, counterweight fly system and a lighting and audio control booth, and a multi-configurable black box theatre with seating arrangements ranging from 25 to 150 seats.

==== Musicals performed ====
Musical	Year
Charlie and the Chocolate Factory	2026
Newsies	2025
Chitty Chitty Bang Bang	2024
Singin' in the Rain	2023
The Music Man	2022
Chitty Chitty Bang Bang	2020
Dirty Rotten Scoundrels	2019
Oliver!	2018
West Side Story	2017
Anything Goes	2016
A Peculiar People (world premiere)	2015
Les Misérables	2014

=== Publications ===
The school has a weekly publication, The Shore Weekly Record, which, along with informing boys and parents of upcoming happenings and sporting fixtures and results, gives boys the opportunity to express their writing and artistic talents in their own section, usually the inner part of the publication.

Other publications are the Shore Reports (quarterly) and the Torch Bearer (yearly).

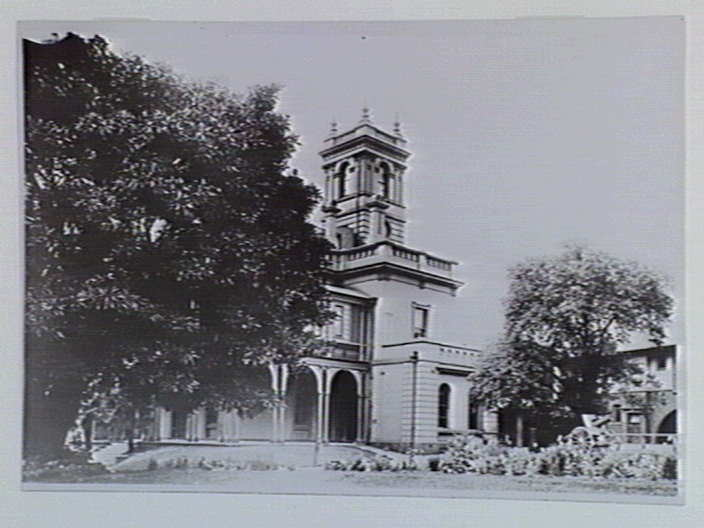
Shore building in 1930, built by Bernhardt Holtermann in

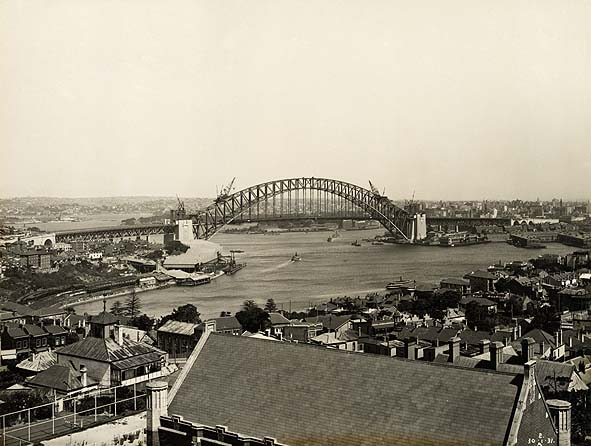
View from the North Sydney campus, 1931

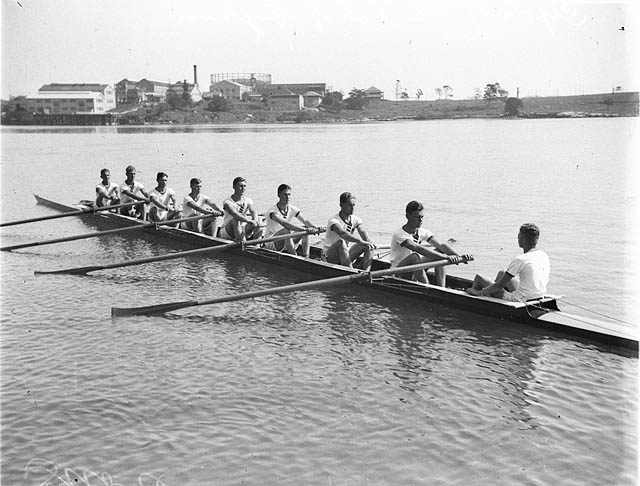
Shore eight-oar crew, 1932

== Headmasters ==
Ordinal	Officeholder			Term start	Term end	Time in office	Notes
Ordinal	Headmaster	Qualifications	Previous positions held	Term start	Term end	Time in office	Notes
1	E. I. Robson	BA (Cantab.), MA (Melb.)	Classics tutor at Ormond College, University of Melbourne	1889	1900	10–11 years	
2	C. H. Hodges	MA (Oxon)	Headmaster, Townsville Grammar	1900	1910	9–10 years	
3	W. A. Purves	MA (Oxon)	Headmaster, Toowoomba Grammar	1910	1922	11–12 years	
4	L. C. Robson CBE, MC	MA (Oxon), BSc (Sydney)	Senior mathematics master, Geelong Grammar	1923	1958	34–35 years	
5	B. H. Travers AM, OBE	MA BLitt (Oxon), BA (Sydney) FACE	Headmaster, Launceston Church Grammar	1959	1984	24–25 years	
6	R. A. I. Grant AM	BEc (Sydney), DipEd (UNE), BEd (Melb.), MACE	Deputy headmaster, Canberra Grammar	1984	2002	17–18 years	
7	T. A. Wright	PhD, DipEd, BSc (Hons), FACE, MRACI, CChem	Headmaster, All Saints, Bathurst; Second Master, Trinity Grammar, Sydney	2003	2019	15–16 years	
8	T. A. Petterson	PhD, MBA, BSc (Hons), GradDipEd, DipBS	Principal, St Philip's Christian College, Port Stephens; Boarding Housemaster, The King's School	2020	2022	1–2 years	
9	Dr. J Collier	BA, DipEd, DipBiblSt, EdD, FACE, FACEL	Principal, Saint Andrews Cathedral School	2022	2025	2–3 years	
10	Dr. P Miller	BEd (Hons), MEd, EdD	Head, All Saints, Bathurst, Principal, Geelong College	2026-			

== Notable alumni ==
Shore alumni are commonly referred to as 'Old Boys', and may elect to join the school's alumni association, the Shore Old Boys Union (OBU). Shore is notable for its strong connections in banking and finance, having produced the current CEO of Challenger Ltd and Chairman of Magellan Financial Group, in addition to CEOs and Chairmen of the Bank of New South Wales (now Westpac), the Commercial Banking Company of Sydney (now NAB), IAG, MLC, Perpetual Limited, and Rothschild Australia. However, some of Shore's most notable old boys have come from other walks of life, including:

- 16 Rhodes Scholars.
- Errol Flynn, actor
- Kenneth Slessor, actor. and Russell Braddon.
- Chancellors and Vice Chancellors of the Australian National University (Melville), the University of London (Windeyer), and the University of New England (Wright).
- Sir Frank Packer, media mogul.
- The founders of Jim's Mowing, Mirvac, Nine News, and Woolworths.
- Former Wimbledon winner and tennis world number one John Newcombe.
- CEO of Rugby Australia and former Wallabies captain Phil Waugh.
- Former Wallabies representative David Codey.
- Former High Court Justices Sir William Owen, Sir Dudley Williams, and Dyson Heydon.
- Former Governor and Chief Justice of Queensland Sir Alan Mansfield.
- Former Reserve Bank of Australia Governors Sir John Grant Phillips, Sir Leslie Melville.
- Former Minister for Foreign Affairs Sir Gordon Freeth.
- Former Prime Minister Sir John Gorton.
- Michael 'Tarzan' Fomenko (c.1930–2018), ocean rower and hermetic bushman, whose father Daniel Fomenko also taught in the school in the 1940s

In 2001, the school was ranked seventh in the Who's Who of boys' school rankings in Australia, and second in New South Wales based on the number of alumni mentioned in Who's Who in Australia.

== Controversies ==
=== Fights ===
Two students at Shore were suspended in May 2023, after a video surfaced displaying a student throwing a table to physically attack a classmate. In a letter sent to parents, the headmaster John Collier stated that the school had taken "decisive action" after the incident took place, and that the police would work with the school to "educate students" about the inappropriateness of violent behaviour. It also stated that it was "utterly unacceptable and goes against the core values" instilled in students. The fight wasn't a spontaneous act of aggression, but rather a "carefully orchestrated event" staged for voyeuristic purposes.

=== Scavenger Hunt ===
A "Year 12" challenge run by a student labelled the "Triwizard Shorenament" (referencing the Triwizard Tournament from Harry Potter) emerged in September 2020, which included a range of inappropriate sexual challenges, racist, harmful and illegal activities (such as spitting on a homeless man). The headmaster at the time, Dr Timothy Petterson, stated that it was "extremely disappointing to all of us that their thoughtless actions have cast a shadow, not only over the considerable achievements of their classmates, but the reputation of our school generally which strives to be a respectful, inclusive and caring environment for all.”

=== TikTok Videos ===
In September 2020, students filmed a TikTok video showing off the campus’ luxury facilities, including a “recovery pool”, a “harbour view library” and a “$50 mill gym". After going viral, the school demanded that it was deleted.

The same month, a TikToker who goes by the name of "Fonzie Gomez" interviewed students from Shore. The boys were asked to name the worst suburbs in Sydney, which arose controversy over the mocking of some of the poorest suburbs in Sydney. One responded "Blacktown", and another student added "Yeah, druggos". One claimed there were "Too many eshays" in the suburb. Another student stated that the worst suburb was "Mosman" because of the "Rich Kids" living there. The school didn't respond for comment, and the video was deleted.

=== Antisemitism ===
In 2017, an "end of year" photo was taken of a group of year 12 students in the school, with the past Deputy Headmaster Rod Morrison, holding a Nazi flag and holding up the Nazi salute. Morrison, after realising what had happened, confiscated the flag off those responsible and called for the photo to be deleted, however it still circulated. The former headmaster Timothy Wright dismissed it as an "“ill-conceived prank and a display of very poor judgment by those caught up in the euphoria of the end of school”.

== See also ==
- List of Anglican schools in New South Wales
- Anglican education in Australia
- Graythwaite
- List of boarding schools in Australia
- Lawrence Campbell Oratory Competition
