= List of alumni of Barker College =

This is a list of notable alumni of Barker College, they being notable former students or alumni of the Anglican Church school, Barker College in Hornsby, New South Wales, Australia. The alumni may elect to join the school's alumni association, the Old Barker Association (OBA), which was formed in 1908 and originally known as the 'Barker College Old Boys Union'. The OBA provides a link between Barker College and its past students, with over 16,500 members.

== Media, entertainment and the arts ==
- David Astle – cryptic crossword compiler for Sydney Morning Herald and The Age newspapers: "DA"
- Anna Bamford – actor, Wonderland
- Andrew Bevis – London West End actor
- John Blackwood, 11th Baron Dufferin and Claneboye – Australian architect
- Mike Carlton – media commentator, radio host, television journalist, author and newspaper columnist
- Simon Fieldhouse – artist
- Jarod Green – founder, The Handsomity Institute and director/creator of the TV series Beached Az
- Takaya Honda – actor, Neighbours and The Family Law
- Hugo Johnstone-Burt – actor, San Andreas
- Chris Lilley – comedian and actor, Summer Heights High
- Nick Littlemore – producer and musician, as a member of Pnau and Empire of the Sun
- Sam Littlemore – producer and musician, as a member of Pnau; also known as Sam La More and Tonite Only
- Simon Marnie – ABC radio presenter
- Peter Mayes – producer and musician, as a member of Pnau and main producer of Empire of the Sun
- Penny McNamee – actor, Home and Away
- Phillip Noyce – film director
- Rosie Waterland – bestselling author and television writer, The Anti Cool Girl, Every Lie I've Ever Told
- James West – journalist, executive producer of Hack on Triple J
- Brian Wilshire (1957–1961) – retired radio presenter
- Sven Holston – New South Wales Indoor Cricket Captain

== Politics, public service, business and the law ==
- John Blaxland – historian and academic at The Australian National University
- Mitch Fifield – senator for Victoria (2004–2019), representing the Liberals
- Peter Garrett AM – Midnight Oil lead singer; environmentalist; former member for Kingsford-Smith, representing Labor, former federal Minister for School Education, Early Childhood and Youth
- Donald Mackay – anti-drugs campaigner
- Rob Oakeshott – former independent member for Lyne and Clarence, formerly representing the Nationals
- Philip Ruddock AO – former Member for Parramatta (1973–1977), former member for Dundas (1977–1993), former member for Berowra (1993–2016), former Minister for Immigration, Multicultural and Indigenous Affairs (1996–2003) and former attorney-general (2003–2007), and mayor of Hornsby Shire Council (2017–2024) representing the Liberals
- Bo Seo – author, journalist and world champion debater
- Robert Solomon – former member for Denison, representing the Liberals, and 1955 NSW Rhodes Scholar
- Jordan van den Lamb – social media activist, and socialist political candidate

== Science, medicine and technology ==
- James Angus – biomedical researcher
- Douglas Armati – writer, researcher and consultant with management expertise in the protection of digital intellectual property
- Craig Barratt – technology executive
- A. David Buckingham – chemist and chemical physicist
- Chris Heyde – statistician, fellow of the Australian Academy of Science
- Andrew Tridgell – creator of and contributor to the Samba software file server for linking Windows clients and Unix file server systems, and co-inventor of the rsync algorithm
- Jeff Waugh – software developer

== Sport ==
- Aden Ekanayake – Australian rugby union player
- Alex Blackwell – Australian and NSW women's cricketer
- Kate Blackwell – Australian and NSW women's cricketer
- Jamie Brazier – Papua New Guinean cricketer
- Brendon Cook – first Indigenous International race car driver
- Ben Darwin – former Wallaby
- Sue Fear OAM – mountaineer, first Australian woman to climb Mount Everest, died in 2006 while climbing
- Sam Figg – former professional rugby player for the Australian 7s team and the Glendale Raptors
- Rachael Gunn – Olympian and academic
- Richard Harry – former Wallaby
- Alyssa Healy – Australian and NSW woman's cricketer
- Isaiya Katoa – NRL Rugby League player
- Nigel Nutt – Australian Commonwealth fencer
- Nicholas Skraem Australian Professional All round sportsman
- Mitchell Pearce – former NRL and NSW State of Origin halfback
- Billy Pollard – professional rugby union player for the ACT Brumbies
- Hamish Carley – Professional pickleball player for the United Pickleball Association
- Hugh Pyle – Melbourne Rebels lock
- Jeff Reid — former Canada Rugby International
- Luke Reimer – professional rugby union player for the ACT Brumbies
- Amy Sayer — football player and member of the Matildas
- Cameron Shepherd — former NSW Waratahs, Western Force and Wallaby fullback
- Lisa Sthalekar — Australian and NSW women's cricketer
- Peter Taylor — former Australian Test and limited-overs cricketer
- Jarrad Weeks — NBL basketball player and assistant coach
- Ben Whittaker — footballer and coach
- Drew Williamson – basketball player
- Jarrod Witts — Australian rules footballer

== See also ==
- Combined Associated Schools
