= List of Old Boys of Waverley College =

This is a list of notable Old Boys of Waverley College Sydney, they being notable former students – known as "Waverlians" – of the Waverley College, an independent, non-selective Roman Catholic day school located in Waverley, New South Wales, Australia.

== Business ==
- Ezra Norton, newspaper proprietor (also attended Scots College)
- Peter Switzer, business journalist

== Clergy ==
- Patrick Dougherty (1931–2010), bishop emeritus and bishop of the Diocese of Bathurst, from 1983 until his death in 2010

== Law ==
- Barry O'Keefe AM QC, judge in the Supreme Court of New South Wales and former commissioner of the NSW Independent Commission Against Corruption
- Charles Waterstreet, Sydney barrister and author

== Media, entertainment, and the arts ==
- Scott Cam, TV personality with the Nine Network
- Sam de Brito, journalist and blogger for the Sydney Morning Herald
- Bruce Dellit, architect, pioneer of the Art Deco style
- Costa Georgiadis, television host for ABC TV's Gardening Australia
- Robert Grasso, head of sport, SBS World News
- Kevin Kearney, film producer, sound designer, location sound recordist, 1960–2015
- Damien Lovelock, singer and sports commentator
- John McKellar, playwright and social satirist
- Justin Melvey, television actor (Home & Away, Days of Our Lives)
- Johnny O'Keefe, rock singer of the 1950s, 1960s and 1970s
- Otis Pavlovic, singer and songwriter
- Alan Reid, political journalist
- David Twohill - Musician with Mental As Anything

== Military ==
- Peter Cosgrove AK MC, 26th governor-general of Australia (2014–2019); chief of the Defence Force (2002–2004); chancellor of Australian Catholic University (2005–2014)
- Bede Kenny VC (1896–1953), recipient of the Victoria Cross

== Other ==
- Victims of the 1979 Sydney Ghost Train fire:
  - Jonathan Billings (1965–1979)
  - Richard Carroll (1966–1979)
  - Michael Johnson (1965–1979)
  - Seamus Rahilly (1965–1979)

== Politics ==
- Peter Collins QC, former leader of the New South Wales Liberal Party, deputy premier and treasurer
- Ludwig Keke (Class of 1954), Nauruan politician, Member of Parliament (1968–1972, 1989–1995, 1997–2000), Speaker of Parliament (1998–2000), and Ambassador to Taiwan (2007–2016)
- John Murphy, Labor politician who served as a member of the Australian House of Representatives from 1998 until 2013, representing Lowe and then Reid
- Bill Tilley, Victorian politician and member for Benambra (also attended St Gregory's College, Campbelltown & Redden College)

== Public and community service ==
- John McCarthy AO, diplomat, ambassador, high commissioner
- Patrick McClure AO, civil society leader, CEO Mission Australia (1997–2006) (also attended St Peter's College, Auckland)

== Sports ==
- Miles Amatosero, rugby union player
- Nick Blakey, AFL footballer, Sydney Swans
- Michael Cleary AO, former rugby union, and rugby league and footballer of the 1950s, 1960s, and 1970s, Commonwealth Games sprint competitor and politician as Minister for Sport in the Wran Government (1981–1988)
- Clay Cross, shot putter and competitor in the 1998, 2002 and 2006 Commonwealth Games
- Ryan Cross, rugby union and rugby league footballer of the 1990s, 2000s, and 2010
- Morris Curotta, sprint competitor, Olympic Games 1948 (London) and 1952 (Helsinki)
- Ben Donaldson, rugby union player
- Tom English, rugby union professional player for the Melbourne Rebels
- Gordon Benjamin Favelle (1912–1987), professional rugby league footballer of the 1930s
- Owen Finegan, rugby union player, part of the wallabies 1999 world cup winning team
- Jack Fingleton OBE, former Australian cricketer, journalist and political commentator
- Adam Freier, broadcaster and former rugby union professional player
- Isaac Heeney, Australian Rules football player at the Sydney Swans
- Stephen Hoiles, rugby union coach and former player, Wallaby and Fox Sports commentator
- Jed Holloway, rugby union player
- Kenneth Kennedy, speed skater and ice hockey player, Australia's first Winter Olympian
- Anatoly Kolesnikov, basketball player
- Massimo Luongo, footballer, Australian Socceroo representative, Queens Park Rangers and formerly of Swindon Town F.C.
- Shawn Mackay, Super Rugby and Commonwealth Games rugby 7s player
- Tony Madigan, Olympic Games boxing bronze medallist
- Davvy Moale, rugby league player
- Luca Moretti, rugby league player
- Ben O'Donnell, rugby union player
- Henry Paterson, rugby union player
- Patrick Phibbs, rugby union player
- Jason Sangha, cricketer
- Chris Talakai, rugby union player
- Sam Talakai, rugby union player
- Klayton Thorn, rugby union player
- Morgan Turinui, rugby union player
- Ronald Volkman, rugby league player
- Asipeli Fine, rugby league player
