= Lawrence Campbell Oratory Competition =

Annual impromptu speaking competition

The Lawrence Campbell Oratory Competition is an annual competition in impromptu public speaking between representatives of each of the Great Public Schools (GPS) and Combined Associated Schools (CAS) in New South Wales, Australia. It was established in 1935, in honour of Lawrence Campbell, a famous teacher of elocution in various schools in Sydney, in the early twentieth century. Between 2006 and 2013, in all but one year (2009), the competition was won by a student in year 11. At the 2015 World University Debating Championships in Malaysia, three of the eight speakers in the Grand Final (representing Sydney, Oxford, and Harvard) were former Lawrence Campbell winners – a testament to the quality of the Lawrence Campbell competition.

Lawrence Campbell (c. 1867 – 22 August 1941) was born Lawrence Marsh in Dover, Kent, and studied at the Polytechnic School of Elocution, London. He had a substantial career on the British stage as a recitalist from 1888, but emigrated to Australia in 1893 for health reasons, settling first in Launceston, Tasmania, then moved to Sydney in 1894. He was noted for readings from Dickens and Shakespeare, taught elocution at the Lawrence Campbell School of Elocution and Physical Culture, and at various schools. He was a popular judge at eisteddfods and was president of the Speech Association of NSW. He married Ida May Wedderburn in 1897 and had a home "Merridale" in up-market Cremorne. The wedding of their daughter Rita to Charles, third son of Major R. H. E. (Roger Hope Edward) Upton, was the social event of 1925. He was awarded an MBE in 1935. He died at his home in Lindfield, New South Wales.

== Format ==
The Lawrence Campbell Oratory is widely regarded as the most prestigious, and difficult of the New South Wales public speaking competitions. Each school is represented by one speaker, who is required to give a speech of eight minutes length on one of three topics given to him 15 minutes beforehand. In this competition, the emphasis is on oratory, the art of speech, and so the manner of delivery counts at least equally with the subject matter. The emphasis is on giving a speech that combines humour with pathos, dramatic elements with more conversational moments, serious commentary with light-hearted asides, quotations drawn from a variety of sources, but all around a common thread based on the chosen topic, and showing the style of the candidate. Accordingly, the style of speech is very different from many other public speaking competitions in which candidates research and prepare speeches of their own in advance, often on questions of current affairs or public policy. With only fifteen minutes to prepare and without the aid of books or references, the content of the speech will test the candidates' general knowledge and ingenuity.

== Participating schools ==
Crest	School	Location	Enrollment	Founded	Denomination	Day/Boarding	School Colors	Number of wins
	Barker College	Hornsby	2700	1890	Anglican	Day & Boarding	Red & Blue	3
	Cranbrook School	Bellevue Hill	1600	1918	Anglican	Day & Boarding	Red, White & Blue	2
	Knox Grammar School	Wahroonga	3200	1924	Uniting Church	Day & Boarding	Black & Blue	3
	Newington College	Stanmore	2000	1863	Uniting Church	Day & Boarding	Black & White	5
	St Aloysius' College	Milsons Point	1300	1879	Catholic (Jesuit)	Day	Blue & Gold	6
	St Ignatius' College	Riverview	1500	1880	Catholic (Jesuit)	Day & Boarding	Blue & White	23
	St Joseph's College	Hunters Hill	1000	1881	Catholic (Marist Brothers)	Day & Boarding	Cerise & Blue	7
	Sydney Boys High School	Moore Park	1200	1883	N/A	Day	Chocolate Brown & Sky Blue	8
	Sydney Church of England Grammar School	North Sydney	1600	1889	Anglican	Day & Boarding	Navy Blue & White	7
	Sydney Grammar School	Darlinghurst	1900	1854	Non-denominational	Day	Black & Gold	16
	The Armidale School	Armidale	600	1894	Anglican	Day & Boarding	Navy Blue & Straw	0
	The King's School	Parramatta	2140	1831	Anglican	Day & Boarding	White & Sky Blue	2
	The Scots College	Bellevue Hill	2100	1893	Presbyterian	Day & Boarding	Gold & Blue	4
	Trinity Grammar School	Summer Hill	2200	1913	Anglican	Day & Boarding	Green, White & Grey	4
	Waverley College	Waverley	1500	1903	Catholic	Day	Royal Blue & Gold	0

Each school is represented by one speaker. Saint Ignatius’ College has the most distinguished history, with twenty-two winning candidates in the competition's history. Waverley College and The Armidale School have never fielded a winning candidate.

== Topics ==
Because of the emphasis on oratory, the topics usually admit of wide latitude for the candidates to be creative. Often, quotations from literature, public figures, and popular culture are chosen as topics, along with proverbs or even single words. Past topics include:

- Assume a virtue if you have it not
- One crowded hour of glorious life is worth an age without a name
- I must follow them, for I am their leader
- He thinks too much – such men are dangerous
- Because it was there
- The devil can recite scripture for his purpose
- The fault, dear Brutus, lies not in the stars
- I am Fate's lieutenant; I act under orders
- Couch Jumping
- Right as the world goes is only in issue between equals in power while the strong do as they will and the weak suffer as they must
- Chaos Often Breeds Life When Order Breeds Habit
- Look at my works, you mighty, and despair
- Two cheers for Democracy
- Blood will have Blood

== Notable past winners ==
The Lawrence Campbell oratory competition has many distinguished previous winners, particularly in the areas of law, politics, and the arts. Famous past winners include:

- Nick Enright (Riverview, playwright)
- Charles Firth (Sydney Grammar, comedian and television personality from The Chaser team)
- Murray Gleeson (St Joseph's, Chief Justice of Australia)
- Nick Greiner (Riverview, Premier of NSW)
- John Hamilton (Judge of the Supreme Court of NSW)
- Clifton Hoeben (Riverview, judge of the Supreme Court of NSW)
- Wayne Hudson (Newington, professor and visiting fellow at ANU)
- Mungo MacCallum (Cranbrook, journalist and member of the Wentworth squatocracy)
- Andrew O'Keefe (Riverview, comedian and television presenter)
- Adam Spencer (St Aloysius', ABC Television and radio presenter)
- Malcolm Turnbull (Sydney Grammar, Prime Minister of Australia)
- Lloyd Waddy (monarchist, Judge of the Family Court)
- Anthony Whealy (Judge of the Supreme Court of NSW)
- Patrick Bateman (Sydney Grammar, Rhodes Scholar and Hakluyt partner)
- Bo Seo (Korean-Australian journalist)

The only people to have won the competition on two occasions are:

- R. W. Bowie (Sydney Grammar – 1939, 1940)
- Murray Gleeson (St Joseph's – 1953, 1955)
- Anthony Jones (Scots – 1999, 2000)
- Jeremy Raper (Sydney Grammar – 2001, 2002)
- Joseph Ware (Barker College – 2008, 2009)

== Controversies ==
There have been many controversies in the history of the competition. These usually arise out of allegations of plagiarism and the use of prepared material in the speech.

Often, the candidate is given the benefit of any doubt, if only because candidates train intensively for the competition and must necessarily think of themes, quotations, and one-liners that may emerge in the speech the candidate later gives at the competition. However, the wholesale repetition of prepared material is strongly discouraged, and with enough proof, a winner may be stripped of the title if wholesale preparation is shown.

There has been criticism that the competition is exclusive to high school boys and that girls cannot enter. Some girls have competed after Barker College and The Armidale School turned co-ed. A comparable contest for schoolgirls, the Dame Enid Lyons Oratory Competition, was inaugurated in 1925.

== Previous winners and runners-up ==
Year	Winner	School	Runner-up	School	Third place	School
1935	R. F. Hughes	St Ignatius' College				
1936	D. F. Cummings	St Ignatius' College				
1937	J. D. E. Bedford	Shore				
1938	W. B. Pritchard	Shore				
1939	R. W. Bowie	Sydney Grammar				
1940	R. W. Bowie	Sydney Grammar				
1941	F. A. Jensen	Sydney Grammar				
1942	Not held	(Death of Lawrence Campbell)				
1943	A. C. Gould	St Ignatius' College				
1944	P. Clyne	Sydney Boys High				
1945	A. E. Melville	Shore				
1946	H. H. Jamieson	Shore				
1947	A. M. Gallagher; W. Glen-Doepel	St Joseph's; Sydney Boys High aeq				
1948	B. Beveridge	Sydney Boys High				
1949	A. D. Robb; A. D. Dingle	Sydney Boys High; Knox aeq				
1950	G. J. Woodburne	Sydney Boys High				
1951	D. H. Lance	Sydney Grammar				
1952	J. M. Bennett	Shore				
1953	A. Murray Gleeson	St Joseph's				
1954	M. Halstead	St Aloysius'				
1955	A. Murray Gleeson	St Joseph's				
1956	J. P. Hamilton	Sydney Boys High				
1957	L. D. Waddy	King's				
1958	Mungo MacCallum	Cranbrook				
1959	A. G. Whealy	St Ignatius' College				
1960	B. P. Jones	St Ignatius' College				
1961	C. Wayne Hudson	Newington				
1962	Gerard C. Windsor	St Ignatius' College				
1963	Nick F. Greiner	St Ignatius' College				
1964	Clifton R. Hoeben	St Ignatius' College				
1965	C. G. McDonald	St Ignatius' College				
1966	Nick P. Enright	St Ignatius' College				
1967	J. S. Eyers	St Ignatius' College				
1968	P. A. Boyle	St Ignatius' College				
1969	W. J. Kavanagh	St Ignatius' College				
1970	L. Olson	Sydney Grammar				
1971	J. D. Scahill	St Ignatius' College				
1972	Malcolm B Turnbull	Sydney Grammar				
1973	P. Green	Newington				
1974	A. C. Byrnes	St Ignatius' College				
1975	J. J. McInerny	St Ignatius' College				
1976	R. R. Harper	Sydney Grammar				
1977	S. Marks	St Joseph's				
1978	D. I. McMahon	Shore				
1979	Max Bonnell	Trinity				
1980	C. G. Mangan	St Joseph's				
1981	C. M. Kelly	Sydney Grammar				
1982	Bruce Meagher	St Ignatius' College				
1983	Mark Swivel	Sydney Boys High				
1984	J. Rice	St Aloysius'				
1985	S. Nixon	Sydney Grammar				
1986	Adam Spencer	St Aloysius'				
1987	A. McKenna	St Aloysius'				
1988	Andrew O'Keefe	St Ignatius' College				
1989	B Franklin	Cranbrook				
1990	J. N. Greiner	St Ignatius' College				
1991	Max Wood	Trinity				
1992	Angus Fitzsimons	Knox				
1993	Charles Firth	Sydney Grammar				
1994	Mark Walsh	St Ignatius' College				
1995	David Yeo	Sydney Grammar				
1996	Peter Phillips	Newington				
1997	Gareth Tilley	Sydney Boys High				
1998	Jeremy Bell	Trinity	James Brown	Knox		
1999	Anthony Jones	Scots				
2000	Anthony Jones	Scots				
2001	Jeremy Raper	Sydney Grammar				
2002	Jeremy Raper	Sydney Grammar				
2003	Not awarded	Winner voluntarily agreed to give up award after a similar speech had been given at a previous competition	2nd and 3rd place also queried and so not awarded			
2004	Mark Longhurst	Newington	Kip Williams	Cranbrook		
2005	Patrick Bateman	Sydney Grammar	Hayden Guthrie	Barker College		
2006	Vikram Joshi	Sydney Grammar	Nathaniel Ware	Barker College		
2007	Edward Miller	Newington	Vikram Joshi	Sydney Grammar		
2008	Joseph Ware	Barker College	William Harris	Scots	Sam Molloy	Sydney Grammar
2009	Joseph Ware	Barker College	Conor Bateman	King's	Daniel Farinha	St Aloysius'
2010	James Monaghan	Sydney Grammar	Daniel Farinha	St Aloysius'	Jack Price	Barker College
2011	Bo Seo	Barker College	Michael Rees	Newington	James Monaghan	Sydney Grammar
2012	Ed Minack	Shore	Bo Seo	Barker College	Harry Maher	St Joseph's College
2013	Robbie Ferguson	Knox	Ed Minack	Shore	Manish Poologasundram	Trinity
2014	Tushaar Garg	Sydney Boys High	Robbie Ferguson	Knox	Joshua Wooller	Scots
2015	Alex Connolly	Trinity	Jake Jerogin	Knox	Sam Wolfe	Sydney Grammar
2016	James Elhindi	St Aloysius'	William Solomon	Barker College	Zachary August	Scots
2017	Joe Bonic	Scots	Daniel Yim	Sydney Grammar	Charlie Hoffman	St Ignatius' College
2018	Jack Issa	St Joseph's College	Sebastian Braham	St Ignatius' College	Justin Lai	Sydney Boys High
2019	Sebastian Braham	St Ignatius' College	Aman Mohamed	Sydney Boys High	Jinyoung Kim	King's
2020	Finn McCredie	Shore	Jivan Naganathan	Sydney Boys High	Jack Davies Jude Egerton-Warburton	St Aloysius' St Ignatius' College
2021	Bernard Lund	St Joseph's College	Aidan Woo	Sydney Grammar	Jivan Naganathan	Sydney Boys High
2022	Marcus Nguyen	Scots	Matthew Davies	St Aloysius'	William Ryan	St Joseph's College
2023	Ethan Zhu	King's	Eric Scholten	Sydney Boys High	Daniel Carter	Newington
2024	Isaac Ford	St Ignatius' College	Hugo Sharkey	Sydney Grammar	Murphy Xi	King's
2025	Callum O’Loughlin	St Aloysius'	James Peate	Waverley	Murphy Xi	King's
2026	Thanh Tran	Sydney Grammar	Ryan Allen	Sydney Boys High	Harry Tong	Knox
