= List of Old Trinitarians =

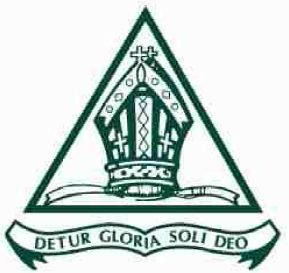

This is a list of Old Trinitarians, they being notable alumni – known as "Old Trinitarians" of the Anglican Church school, Trinity Grammar School, Sydney in Summer Hill, New South Wales, Australia.

== Business ==
- Andrew Bruce Gordon – executive chairman of the WIN Corporation Pty Ltd; ranked 891 on The World's Billionaires 2007 (also attended Saltus Grammar School)
- David Warren AO – inventor of the flight data recorder (also attended Launceston Church Grammar School)

== Entertainment, media and the arts ==
- Nick Adams – attended school as Nick Adamopoulos, US based author and commentator
- John Antill OBE – composer (also attended St Andrew's Cathedral School)
- Gary Catalano – poet
- Tristan Jepson – late actor and comedian, Big Bite on Seven Network
- Akmal Saleh – comedian and actor
- Angus Sampson – actor (also attended The Armidale School)
- Peter Wherrett – motoring journalist
- Richard Wherrett AM – late theatre director

== Religion ==
- Ernest Eric Hawkey – bishop of Carpentaria, 1968–1974
- Richard Hurford – Anglican bishop of Bathurst
- Kenneth Herbert Short AO – Anglican suffragan bishop in the Sydney Diocese
- William Wynn Jones – Anglican bishop of Central Tanganyika

== Sport ==
- Luke Adams – race walker, Commonwealth Games 2002 and 2006 silver medalist
- Nathan Antunes – former Australian A1 Grand Prix rookie driver; international race car driver
- Fotunuupule Auelua – former ACT Brumbies Super Rugby player; played for French Clubs US Dax and RC Toulonnais in the European Top 14 Competition, and the NTT Communications Shining Arcs in Japan's Top League competition
- Steven Barnett – diver, Athens Olympics 2004 bronze medalist
- Ryan Briscoe – Indycar
- Rohan Browning – sprinter, 2018 Commonwealth Games, 2020 Summer Olympics, 2024 Summer Olympics and 2026 Commonwealth Games athlete
- Caiden Cleary – Sydney Swans footballer
- Adam D'Apuzzo – former midfielder for Newcastle Jets, A-League
- David D'Apuzzo – former midfielder for Central Coast Mariners, A-League
- Jack Debreczeni – current assistant coach for New South Wales Waratahs and former fly-half for New South Wales Waratahs, ACT Brumbies, Melbourne Rebels & Chiefs (rugby union) Super Rugby Teams
- Tane Edmed – current Wallabies and ACT Brumbies fly half, former NSW Waratahs player
- Sam Fricker – diver, competed in Olympic Games 2020 and Commonwealth Games 2022 bronze medalist
- William Hickey – basketball player
- Olli Hoare – middle distance athlete, Commonwealth Games 2022 gold medalist in 1500m, Olympic Games 2020, Olympic Games 2024 and 2026 Commonwealth Games athlete
- Lachlan Ilias – current Gold Coast Titans halfback, former St George Illawarra Dragons NRL and South Sydney Rabbitohs player
- Lars Kleppich – 2000 Summer Olympics sailor
- Tom Lambert – current NSW Waratahs prop and former Glasgow Warriors player
- James Leckie – Commonwealth Games and Super Rugby rugby union referee; international rugby union touch judge
- Joel Milburn – 400m sprinter, competed in the 2012 Olympics; 5th fastest Australian all time
- Cameron Orr – former Seattle Seawolves prop in Major League Rugby and former Super Rugby Melbourne Rebels,Western Force and Gloucester Rugby player in the Aviva Premiership
- Prashanth Sellathurai – gymnast, national pommel horse champion since 2006; former world No.3 for pommel horse; commonly referred to as "Prince of the Pommel"; dual gold medalist and bronze medalist at the 2010 Commonwealth Games, silver medalist at the 2006 Commonwealth Games
- Rory Sidey – former Melbourne Rebels, NSW Waratahs and Western Force Super Rugby union player
- Glenn Singleman – base jumper; world record holder of the highest base jump in history
- Scott Sio – former Wallabies, ACT Brumbies and former NSW Waratahs Super Rugby Union Prop;
- Kenneth To – swimmer, Commonwealth Games 2008 bronze medalist and Youth Olympics 2009 gold medalist, 2010 Singapore Youth Olympics medalist, 2010 Dubai FINA World Championships (25m) finalist and 2012 FINA Swimming World Cup Champion

== See also ==
- List of non-government schools in New South Wales
- List of boarding schools
- Combined Associated Schools
