= Shawn Mackay =

Australian rugby union footballer

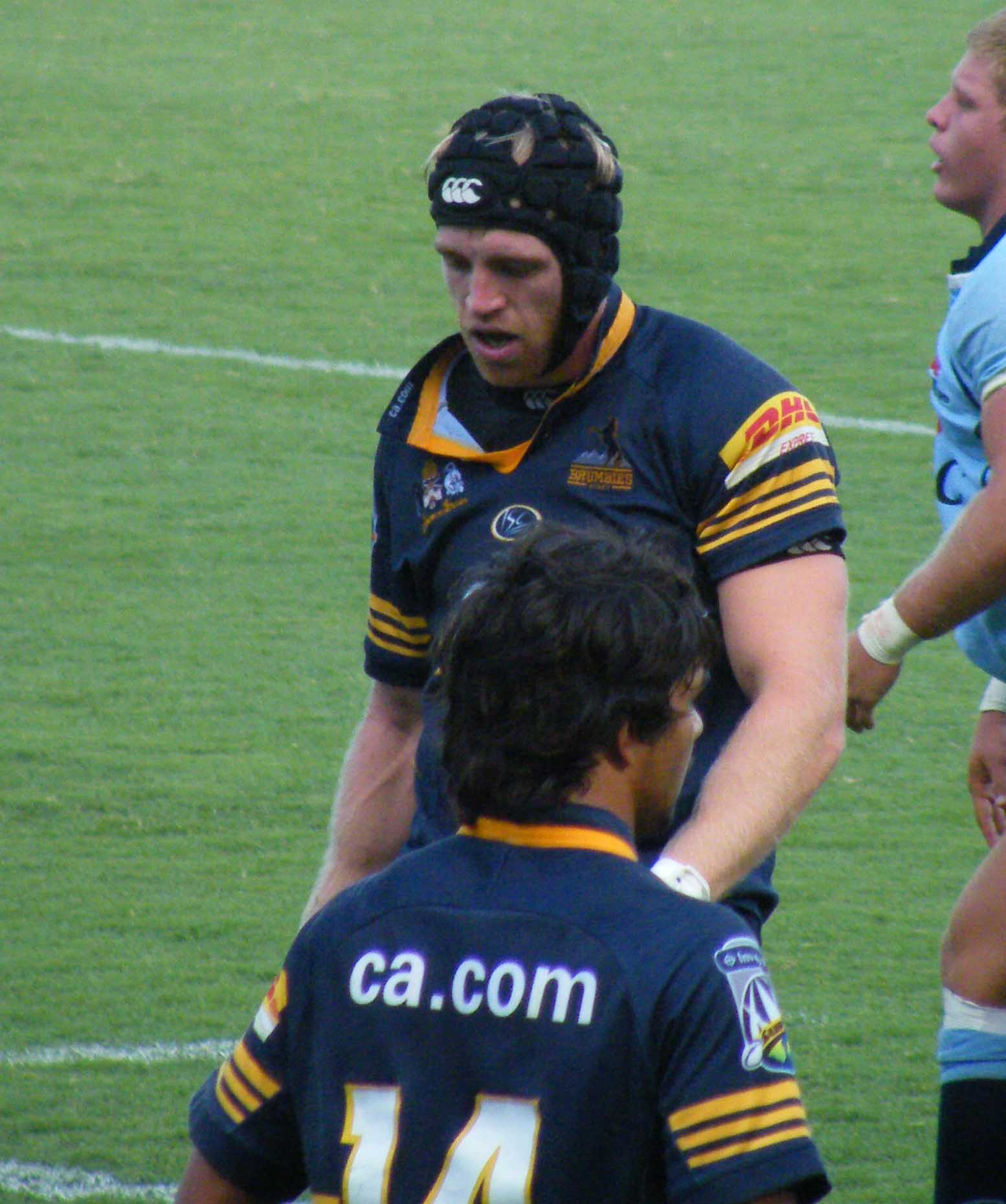
- Mackay in February 2009
- Born: Shawn Mackay; 31 May 1982 Sydney, Australia
- Died: 6 April 2009 (aged 26) Durban, South Africa
- School: Waverley College
- Notable relative: John Mackay (father)

Rugby union career
- Position: Lock/Back Row
Youth career
- -: Clovelly Sea Eagles
Amateur team(s)
Years	Team	Apps	(Points)
–	Waverley College		
Senior career
Years	Team	Apps	(Points)
2006	Waratahs		
2007-08	Melbourne Rebels		
2009	Brumbies		
2010-2014	Randwick		
2008-2009	Red Heavies		
National sevens team
Years	Team		Comps
2004-2008	Australia 7s		
Coaching career
- Years: Team
- 2008-09: Australia 7s 7s

Shawn Mackay (31 May 1982 – 6 April 2009) was an Australian rugby union player with the Canberra based Brumbies in the Super 14 competition. He was the son of former Eastern Suburbs rugby league player John Mackay.

== Career ==
Mackay began playing rugby as a 6-year-old for the Clovelly Sea Eagles, alongside great friend and former Wallabies vice Captain Morgan Turinui. Mackay and Turinui attended St Anthony's in Clovelly and Waverley College together. He was the best man at Turinui's wedding and godfather to his son Felix. These two great mates played together in the Waverley College First XV, along with Mackay's fellow Brumbies teammates Stephen Hoiles and Patrick Phibbs.

Mackay signed with the Sydney Roosters in the NRL in 2000, and won a Premiership with their Jersey Flegg side in 2002. He returned to rugby union in 2004 with the Australian Sevens, and became the Captain of the team in 2005 through until 2008. He was the team captain at the 2006 Commonwealth Games. Mackay signed with the Waratahs in 2006 and won 6 state caps for the NSW side. In 2007 he played with the Melbourne Rebels in the Australian Rugby Championship. Mackay signed with the Brumbies for the 2009 Super 14 season and won 2 caps for the Canberra club. He played with Randwick for 4 seasons, and joined the University of Queensland at the completion of the 2008 Sevens calendar.

Mackay coached the Australian women's Sevens team to the Oceania title in 2008. The team was undefeated and they qualified for the inaugural women's IRB World Cup 7s tournament. The team would go on to win the inaugural event in March 2009. Cheryl Soon, the team's captain, affectionately called Mackay "one of the girls". Mackay had said to the side that if Sevens became an Olympic Sport then he would have returned to coach the side.

== Death ==
Mackay played for the Brumbies in their 35–14 loss to the Sharks in Durban on 28 March 2009. At 4:15 am, 29 March 2009, Mackay and 15 Brumbies teammates left a Durban nightclub. While crossing the road to board the team bus, Shawn was hit by the driver of an armed response vehicle. He suffered a badly broken leg, along with head and spinal injuries. One of the first people to attend to Mackay was Sharks prop Jannie du Plessis, a practising doctor, who was with the Brumbies group at the time. Du Plessis contacted emergency services and helped Mackay breathe while awaiting their arrival. Mackay was stabilised and taken to St Augustine's hospital in Durban and placed into a medically induced coma. Mackay died from a cardiac arrest caused by a blood infection following surgery on 6 April 2009.

A Minutes Applause was held in Mackay's honour for the Brumbies emotional homecoming against the Stormers on 11 April 2009. The Brumbies won the game 17–10. Shawn's longtime friend Patrick Phibbs scored the match winning try in the 60th minute. "That one was for Macca," said Phibbs.

Mackay's funeral was held on 15 April 2009 at Mary Immaculate Church in Waverley. Seven jerseys were placed on his coffin to recognize his rugby career - the Clovelly Sea Eagles, Waverley College, the Roosters, Randwick, the Melbourne Rebels, the Australian Sevens and the Brumbies. Celebrant Father Lucas profoundly said: "He might not have had a full life, but it sounds to me he was full of life."

The Brumbies dedicated the 2009 Super 14 to Shawn. The number 18 jersey, that he wore in the match against the Sharks, was retired for the remainder of the season.
