= Nigel Nutt =

Australian Fencer

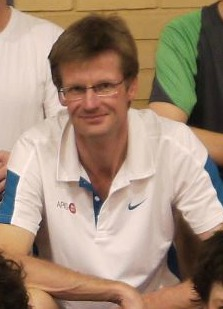
- Nutt in 2012.

Personal information
- Full name: Nigel Robert Forbes Nutt
- Born: 26 March 1966 (age 60) Sydney, Australia

Fencing career
- Sport: Fencing
- Country: Australia
- Club: Swordplay fencing Club, Canberra
- Domestic ranking: Australian Fencing

Nigel Robert Forbes Nutt (born 26 March 1966) is an Australian fencer.

== Fencing career ==
Nutt is regarded as one of Australia's best fencers, having achieved the rank of Gold (top 8) in the Australian Commonwealth Fencing Championships, and competed at the Commonwealth Veteran Fencing Championships, the Australian Open, and numerous other fencing Opens such as the Scottish Open, Bristol Open and the New Zealand Open.

In 1990, Nutt fenced in the Commonwealth Fencing Championships held in Manchester, England, and finished in the top 30. Later the same year, Nutt fenced in the World Cup - Challenge Brut held in Paris, France and finished in the top 60 of the world.

In 1995, Nutt was appointed President of the West Australia Fencing Association.

In 2000, he became the Director for the Australian Fencing Federation.

In 2001, he was appointed the President of the ACT Fencing Association.

Nutt has served as the Australian under-17 cadet coach.

Nutt has been awarded the Robyn Chaplin OAM Award for services to fencing, an Australian Sports Medal and has won Gold in National Veterans - Men's Épée five times throughout the years of 1994–2013.

== Early life ==
Originally from Sydney, Nutt attended Barker College and later succeeded in a degree for engineering at Oxford University, where he received a scholarship for fencing.

In 1980, Nutt started fencing at the age of 14, whilst attending Barker College and when asked, Nutt responded by saying; 'I loved it ever since I picked up a foil as it was something that I have always wanted to do'. His younger sister, Abigail, was also a fencer.
