= Sam de Brito =

Australian journalist

Sam de Brito (30 January 1969 – 12 October 2015) was a Sydney-born author and writer for The Sydney Morning Herald and The Age who wrote the blog All Men Are Liars.

== Family and early life ==
De Brito was a member of an accomplished Australian media family. His grandfather William Blake was a reporter for The Truth in Melbourne and Adelaide, and his mother Julie co-founded what became the company Media Monitors in the late 1970s with broadcaster Ian Parry-Okeden. His maternal uncles Peter Blake, Terry Blake and Patrick Blake are, or were, journalists, as are his cousins Sarah Blake (daughter of Terry) and Emma Blake (daughter of Patrick).

De Brito's father was the South African-born journalist Gus de Brito, who emigrated to Australia in the early 1960s. In South Africa, the elder de Brito had written about the emerging black civil rights movement; and in 1972, as a reporter for Sydney tabloid The Daily Mirror, he wrote a major feature article about Aboriginal rights activist Gary Foley. Later, Foley recalled the article "overnight had created instant notoriety ... for me", but that he had developed "an unlikely friendship" with the journalist who wrote it.

His sister is journalist Kate de Brito, who in October 2015 left News Corp, where she had been online news editor, Head of Digital and author of the long-running agony aunt column "Ask Bossy", to become editor-in-chief of Mia Freedman's women's interest website, Mamamia; She returned to News Corp as editor-in-chief in January 2017.

In 1975, having divorced de Brito's father, his mother married broadcaster Sean Flannery, to whom she remained married until Flannery's death from cancer in 2011. Gus de Brito died in 1999.

De Brito attended Waverley College where he was bullied, and later became a bully himself. "When I was in Years 5 and 6, I copped it savagely for reasons I still don't entirely understand but suspect were linked to me being somewhat bookish, articulate and effeminate..." de Brito wrote. "The pattern continued in Years 7 and 8 at my new high school but seemed to settle on my ethnicity – being a wog, 'f***ing off back to my own country' etc."

== Film and TV ==
In 1998 de Brito wrote, directed and starred in the comedy film Revenge, Inc with Daniel Einfeld, a writer on the Australian television game show Who Dares Wins. He went on to be a scriptwriter until 2004, penning episodes of Australian TV dramas including Water Rats, White Collar Blue and Stingers.

He made a cameo appearance in 2013 as a "Shopkeeper" on the TV comedy series Housos.

== Writing ==
=== Journalism ===
Prior to his work at Fairfax, De Brito was a journalist for the Daily Telegraph, the US tabloid Star magazine while he was living in New York City and later the Nine Network/Microsoft joint venture ninemsn in the News Department.

=== All Men Are Liars ===
De Brito's blog dealt with men's issues and gained a large following for its heavily confessional, autobiographical content. He also had a weekly column in the Sunday Age and Sun-Herald, also named "All Men Are Liars".

The blog was live from August 2006, allegedly registering more than 130,000 reader comments and more than 20 million page impressions. In December 2006 it was voted best Australian and New Zealand blog in The Weblog Awards. In December 2007, the blog was runner up in the same competition.

"I have a pretty healthy following but I doubt they'd read me if I was at The Oz. Too many big words," de Brito told journalist Caroline Overington in a 2011 interview. "I would be nowhere without the vehicle of Fairfax behind me."

=== Author ===
De Brito was the author of five books. No Tattoos Before You're Thirty is an advice guide to the author's yet-to-be-born children, published through Penguin; Building a Better Bloke is a humorous self-improvement guide drawing from his experiences and feedback from his blog, published in August 2008 also through Penguin. No Sex With Your Ex followed in 2009 – an advice guide for young people concerning drugs and alcohol, socialising, body image, sex, relationships & dating, and violence.

Picador published his novels The Lost Boys (2008) and Hello Darkness (2011). Both follow the laddish adventures of Ned Jelli, a thinly veiled version of the author.

Reviewer Nigel Krauth, writing in The Australian, said reading The Lost Boys "as a male reader, is like taking the heartfelt kiss of the world's most gorgeous girl right after she has spewed through her nose in a Bondi hotel toilet. It's ugly, but the underlying truth is what counts. On the other hand, if you are a female reader, it equates to the exhilaration of hearing your guy tell you the truth at last."

However, playwright Louis Nowra wrote in The Australian of Hello Darkness: "there seems little difference between the younger Ned and the older Ned, who remains obsessed by rooting, porn, wanking, surfing, eating junk food and smoking dope. ... the novel resembles a blog with its monotonous riffs on women, drugs and alcohol. And like most blogs, the vocabulary is limited, the paragraphs lack rhythm and the chapters have little internal coherence." Nowra concluded, "There are popular genres such as chick lit and lad lit, but de Brito has established a category all his own: dickhead lit."

=== Views ===
De Brito wrote columns in a provocative style. His views, notably those on women and feminism, were frequently criticised by bloggers and columnists.

De Brito criticised Australian feminists, arguing that they fail to engage ordinary people. In 2013 he argued that "having a laugh and taking the piss is a mighty effective way of shrugging off life's many worries", chiding women for failing to respond favourably to men's jokes. "The most powerful, effective feminists I know don't live on Twitter railing against stupid beer ads and rape scenes in Game of Thrones – they compete against and beat men. They don't demand equality – they assume it," he wrote in 2014.

De Brito publicly supported the pick-up artist movement, and in 2014 argued that mass murderer Elliot Rodger was motivated by mental illness, not a hatred of women.

On 20 May 2014, he wrote a Sydney Morning Herald article entitled "What we can learn from Tara Moss's rapist". In the article, De Brito identified and published a photograph of the man who had raped author and feminist Tara Moss, although Moss had never named her assailant in her memoir The Fictional Woman. After complaints from readers, the article was removed from the Sydney Morning Herald website.

In a 2011 interview with Caroline Overington, de Brito stated "I think a lot of people confuse sexism with misogyny. I'm definitely sexist, but most people are. I've written more positive columns about feminism than any other mainstream male journo in the country in the last five years. A lot of feminists don't seem to like that – a yobbo in their playground."

== Personal life ==
De Brito wrote extensively about his daughter, who was born around 2010, and the collapse of his relationship with her mother.

"My daughter is the most important thing in my life now," he said in 2011. "Everything runs second to her, which is quite a change of pace for a pathological narcissist." In 2014, he wrote, "I had spent my life waiting for someone I could love unconditionally, who I would always be there for. I'd thought it would be a partner or a lover, but in fact it was my child."

On 12 October 2015, Sam de Brito was discovered dead in his Eastern Suburbs home.
