= George Weeks (priest) =

George Edward Weeks (26 December 1868 – 25 August 1941) was an English Anglican clergyman who was the Dean of Nelson from 1916 to 1923.

Weeks was born in Portsmouth, the son of George Horatio Weeks. He was educated at Queens' College, Cambridge (B.A. 1890; M.A. 1896), Durban University (B.D. 1901) and Trinity College Dublin (LL.B. 1910; LL.D. 1911). He was ordained in 1893. His first post was a curacy at St George in the East, Stepney After this he was at St James, Hatcham then a naval chaplain. He held incumbencies in Durban, South Kensington and Lowestoft before his time as Dean. Afterwards he was Headmaster of Trinity Grammar School, Sydney.

He married Marian Frances Sophia Simmonds in 1894. He died in 1941.
