= Waverley College =

Location
- 131 Birrell Street; Waverley, Sydney; Australia
- Coordinates: 33°53′50″S 151°15′21″E

Information
- Type: Independent early learning, primary and secondary school
- Motto: Latin: Virtus Sola Nobilitat (Virtue alone ennobles)
- Religious affiliation: Catholicism
- Denomination: Congregation of Christian Brothers
- Established: 27 January 1903; 123 years ago
- Trust: Edmund Rice Education Australia
- Chairman: Mark Davies
- Head of College: Graham Leddie
- Chaplain: Bernie Thomas ofm
- Years offered: Early learning and Year 5–Year 12
- Gender: Boys
- Enrollment: c. 1,400 (2016)
- Houses: Aungier; Brennan; Conlon; Green; Lacey; O'Connor; Quinn; Tevlin
- Colours: Royal blue and gold
- Affiliation: Combined Associated Schools
- Alumni: Waverlians

Waverley College is a dual-campus independent Catholic early learning, primary and secondary day school for boys, located on Birrell and Henrietta Street in Waverley, in the eastern suburbs of Sydney, Australia. The school was founded by the Congregation of Christian Brothers in 1903 and is operated in the tradition of Blessed Edmund Rice through its membership of Edmund Rice Education Australia.

The non-selective College caters for approximately 1,400 students from early learning; and Year 5 to Year 12 across two campuses.

In 2023, the school celebrated 120 years of Catholic education.

== History ==
The school was founded in 1903; opening with 20 students, operating from a house in Salisbury Street, ‘Airmount’, until proper facilities could be constructed. A purpose-built school house was finished in 1903 and expanded with an additional two floors by 1919.

In 1938, the school started accepting boarders. The school's boarders came from rural New South Wales, Victoria, Queensland, Papua New Guinea, Hong Kong, Malaysia, Norfolk Island, Nauru, New Caledonia, Saigon and Singapore. The school stopped taking boarders in 1979.

== Affiliations ==
Waverley College is a member of the Combined Associated Schools (CAS) in NSW. Other members include Barker College, Cranbrook School, Knox Grammar School, St. Aloysius’ College and Trinity Grammar School. This membership provides students with access to academic and sporting competition.

Waverley College is also affiliated with the Association of Heads of Independent Schools of Australia (AHISA), the Junior School Heads Association of Australia (JSHAA), and the Catholic Secondary Schools Association NSW/ACT (CSSA).

== Sport ==
Waverley College is a member of the Combined Associated Schools (CAS).

=== CAS premierships ===
Waverley College has won the following CAS premierships.

- Athletics (26) – 1944, 1945, 1947, 1949, 1950, 1953, 1954, 1956, 1958, 1960, 1963, 1964, 1965, 1974, 1975, 1976, 1977, 1978, 1979, 1980, 1981, 1982, 1993, 1994, 1995, 2025
- Australian Football (2) – 2019, 2020
- Basketball (6) – 1992, 1994, 1995, 1998, 2006, 2026
- Cricket (4) – 1997, 2003, 2015, 2025
- Rugby (37) – 1944, 1946, 1947, 1948, 1950, 1951, 1952, 1953, 1955, 1957, 1958, 1959, 1961, 1962, 1963, 1965, 1966, 1968, 1971, 1974, 1979, 1980, 1981, 1983, 1987, 1992, 1996, 1997, 2000, 2002, 2004, 2007, 2009, 2016, 2017, 2020, 2023
- Soccer (7) – 1996, 1998, 2003, 2008, 2009, 2017, 2023
- Swimming (21) – 1951, 1952, 1958, 1960, 1961, 1962, 1973, 1988, 1989, 1990, 1991, 1993, 1994, 1995, 1996, 1997, 1998, 1999, 2000, 2001, 2002
- Tennis Summer (2) – 1992, 2003
- Water Polo (4) – 1989, 1990, 1993, 1999

== Notable alumni ==
Alumni of Waverley College are known as Old Boys or Waverlians, and may elect to join the school's alumni association, the Waverley College Old Boys' Union that was established in December 1908.

== Cadets ==
The Waverley College Cadet Unit (WCCU) also known as WCACU was originally founded in 1911. The unit currently has over 340 members and offers a wide variety of leadership positions. Students in Year 8 & 9 are required to participate in the cadet program and are given the option to continue into Year 10 and thereafter. Attendance at Annual Promotion Courses are voluntary and result in the gaining of rank and responsibility within the unit structure.

== See also ==
- List of Catholic schools in New South Wales
- Catholic education in Australia
