= John Mackay (rugby league) =

Australian rugby league footballer

Personal information
- Born: 2 March 1956 (age 70) Macksville, New South Wales, Australia

Playing information
- Position: Second-row, Prop
Club
Years	Team	Pld	T	G	FG	P
1976–79	Eastern Suburbs	32	4	0	0	12
1980–82	Newtown	23	0	0	0	0
1983–88	Eastern Suburbs	63	3	0	0	12
	Total	118	7	0	0	24
- Relatives: Shawn Mackay (son)

John Mackay is an Australian former professional rugby league footballer in the New South Wales Rugby League premiership. He played with Sydney club Eastern Suburbs in the years 1976, 1978–1979 and 1983–1988. He also played for the Newtown Jets from 1980 to 1982.

A Backrower, Mackay played in 94 first grade matches for Eastern Suburbs, and 21 for the Newtown Jets club.

His son Shawn was a member of Easts Jersey Flegg (U21) winning side in the 2002 season. His son died 6 April 2009 from an infection following a motor vehicle accident.
