= Trinity Grammar School (New South Wales) =

- Trinity Grammar School, pictured in 2007

Location
- Inner West Sydney, New South Wales; Australia: 33°53′58″S 151°7′50″E (Summer Hill); 33°52′55″S 151°05′30″E (Strathfield)

Information
- Type: Independent single-sex early learning, primary. and secondary day and former boarding schoolmr
- Motto: Latin: Detur Gloria Soli Deo (Let Glory Be Given To God Alone)
- Religious affiliation: Diocese of Sydney
- Denomination: Anglican Church
- Established: 1913; 113 years ago
- Founder: George Chambers
- Educational authority: New South Wales Education Standards Authority
- Chairman: Richard Pegg
- Headmaster: Timothy Bowden
- Employees: ~200
- Years: Early learning and K–12
- Gender: Boys
- Enrolment: c. 2,000 (2007)
- Campuses: Summer Hill (Kindergarten to Year 12); Strathfield (Early learning to Year 6); Woollamia (Outdoor education)
- Area: 8 hectares (20 acres) (Summer Hill)
- Colours: Green and white
- Slogan: Detur Gloria Soli Deo (Glory Give to God Alone)
- Affiliations: International Boys' Schools Coalition; Association of Heads of Independent Schools of Australia; The Independent Primary School Heads of Australia; Junior School Heads Association of Australia; Australian Boarding Schools' Association; Combined Associated Schools; Independent Primary School Heads of Australia; Kwansei Gakuin Senior High School
- Alumni: Old Trinitarians
- Website: www.trinity.nsw.edu.au

Trinity Grammar School is a multi-campus independent Anglican single-sex early learning, primary and secondary day school for boys, in Inner West Sydney, New South Wales, Australia. The main campus in Summer Hill provides a comprehensive education to students from Year 7 to Year 12; the campus in Strathfield provides a comprehensive education to early learning and primary school students, from Kindergarten to Year 6; and outdoor education facilities are located at Woollamia on the NSW South Coast. The school previously enrolled boarders until the end of 2019.

Founded in 1913 by George Chambers at Dulwich Hill, the school has a non-selective enrolment policy and currently caters for approximately 2,000 (during 2007)students. The Headmaster of Trinity Grammar School is Timothy Bowden.

Trinity is affiliated with the International Boys' Schools Coalition (IBSC), the Association of Heads of Independent Schools of Australia (AHISA), The Independent Primary School Heads of Australia (IPSHA), which was formerly known as the Junior School Heads Association of Australia (JSHAA), the Independent Primary School Heads of Australia, the Australian Boarding Schools' Association (ABSA), and is a founding member of the Combined Associated Schools (CAS).

== Governance ==
The School is governed by a Council (appointed by ordinance of the Diocese of Sydney), with the Archbishop of Sydney, Kanishka Raffel as the President. The council currently has seventeen members, with six lay members being elected by the Synod of the Diocese of Sydney, six clergy being elected by the Synod, and three being nominated by the Old Trinitarians Union (OTU). The final two positions are voted on by the sitting members of the council. James Mills was Chairman of the School Council for thirty-three years. Richard Pegg is the current chairman.

Trinity Grammar's "sister school" is Meriden School at Strathfield, an independent, Anglican, day school for girls. In 2018, Trinity Grammar School began integrating Meriden's cadet unit into Trinity's cadet unit.

== History ==
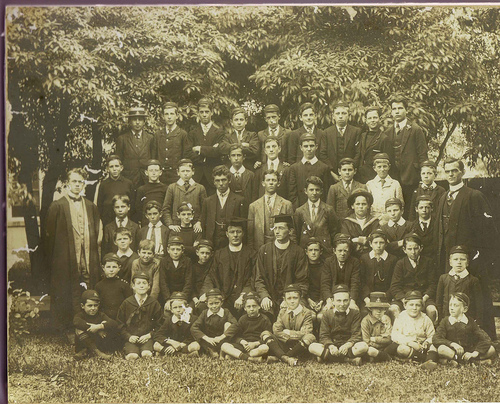
The first school photograph, 1913

George Chambers OBE , DD, subsequently Bishop of Central Tanganyika, founded the School in 1913 at Dulwich Hill, of which parish - the Parish of Holy Trinity - he was then Rector. At its foundation, Trinity was a small parochial school with 29 boys enrolled. This number had reached 57 at the end of that year.

Having been appointed Warden of the School, Chambers' immediate task was to find a Headmaster. Thus, K.T. Henderson was appointed as the first Headmaster of Trinity Grammar in February 1913. In November 1915, the School formulated its motto, Detur Gloria Soli Deo, which may be translated from Latin to "Let Glory be Given to God Alone". The School colours were chosen to reflect the liturgical season of Trinity, namely green.

A property known as "The Towers" was purchased by the parish and used both as a School and Rectory. Later a larger property, "Hazeldene", was to be bought, also acting as both school and Rectory. The present site at Summer Hill, set in 8 hectares (20 acres) of land, was first occupied by the School in 1926, during the Head Mastership of G. E. Weeks.

By 1942 the prospects for Trinity were grim and it was decided that it should be closed. As a last attempt to save the School, the Council appointed James Wilson Hogg as Headmaster in 1944. By the time Wilson Hogg retired in 1974, Trinity was flourishing and had become one of the leading independent schools in NSW.

=== Milestones ===
- 1988 – 75th anniversary of the whole school.
- 2013 – Centenary of whole school and also 75th anniversary of the Preparatory school.

=== Trinity Grammar School Preparatory School ===
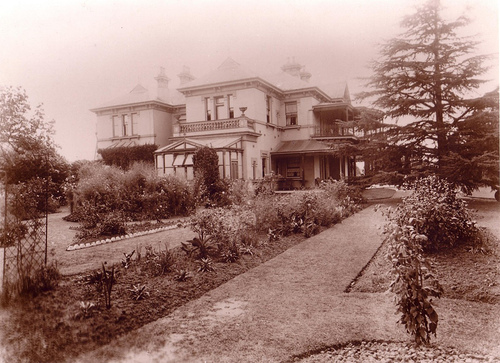
Trinity Preparatory School, 1930s

Sir Philip Sydney Jones was the original owner of the site on which the Preparatory School is now located. Upon his death, the area surrounding the house (including the house itself) was split into several areas which were then put up for auction. A small group of Strathfield residents first had the idea of using a portion of the grounds as a school, which became Strathfield Grammar School.

In 1926 it was offered to Trinity Grammar School and bought by them, but Strathfield Grammar School and Trinity Grammar School continued to function as separate establishments until 1932, when the two became Trinity Grammar School. From 1932 until 1937, most, if not all, of the teaching was done in Strathfield, although the school still used the Summer Hill Campus for sport. However, in 1938 the Senior School returned to Summer Hill and the Strathfield Campus for the first time became the Preparatory School.

The Preparatory School grounds are actually three separate properties - "Milverton", "Llandilo" and "Somerset." Milverton House was purchased by the school in 1966 and was used for educating "Sub Primary" or infants students. The most recent extension on "Milverton" was completed in 1991 and the building is now large enough to house the entire Infants department. Somerset was designed by Bertrand James Waterhouse and built in 1923 for James and Dorothy Larcombe (1900–1990). James Larcombe died in 1943 and his widow married Sir Percy Joske in 1969. Somerset was purchased by Trinity after the death of Lady Joske in 1990 and the Joske room, located on the edge of Somerset takes her name. "Llandilo" house is the largest of all the properties of the Preparatory School. Since its initial purchase in 1932 it has been the main building of Strathfield campus, providing education for the furthest advanced boys in the Primary curriculum. In 2005, a new sports and music centre was opened opposite "Llandilo." This contains over 10 music studios, as well as several larger music rooms and an underground gym. This allowed all of the Primary School to finally be moved back into "Llandilo," which had ceased to function properly with the sharp rise in student numbers before that date. In 2010, a new library was completed underneath the staff room, which has a connection to the "Llandilo" building.

Trinity Grammar School Preparatory School has grown extensively over the years, but the overall size of the property is much less than the original holdings of Sir Philip Sydney Jones.

=== Junior school ===
In 1946 the then Headmaster, Mr James Wilson Hogg, introduced a Junior School to the Summer Hill Campus and commenced with 36 boys in four classrooms. The Junior School, in various arrangements of classes and with up to 78 boys continued at Summer Hill until 1956, when all of the primary school boys were relocated to the Preparatory School at Strathfield.

In 2000 the Junior School was re-established by the Headmaster, Mr G. Milton Cujes, on the Summer Hill campus as a gesture of good faith to the families who had committed to the Southern Campus, a venture that until this date has not been realised. The Junior School recommenced with 72 boys in four classes from Year 3 to 6. The classes were located in temporary accommodation between No.1 Oval and No.3 Oval.

In 2002, the School Council determined that the Junior School would become a permanent part of the educational profile at the Summer Hill Campus for the foreseeable future.

In 2003 the Junior School moved to permanent accommodation in the old Boarding House, and was formally recommissioned in a ceremony whose guests included Messrs Neil Buckland and Neil Demeril, both of whom had been students at the Summer Hill Junior School in the 1940s.

In 2006, the Junior School expanded to include an Infants Campus, based in Lewisham, specifically for children from pre-school to Year 2 age. The site for this development was the land on which the St Thomas Beckett Primary School had been previously located. This portion of the school began with 12 students, and now has over 50 students.

Having received planning permission from Ashfield council, the School has proceeded to demolish several houses on Seaview Street, creating a space in which the new Junior School was to be built. Construction on the site concluded in later end of 2012 and the new Junior School was officially opened on 3 October 2012 by Robert Forsyth. In 2013, Trinity started a preschool.

== Headmasters ==
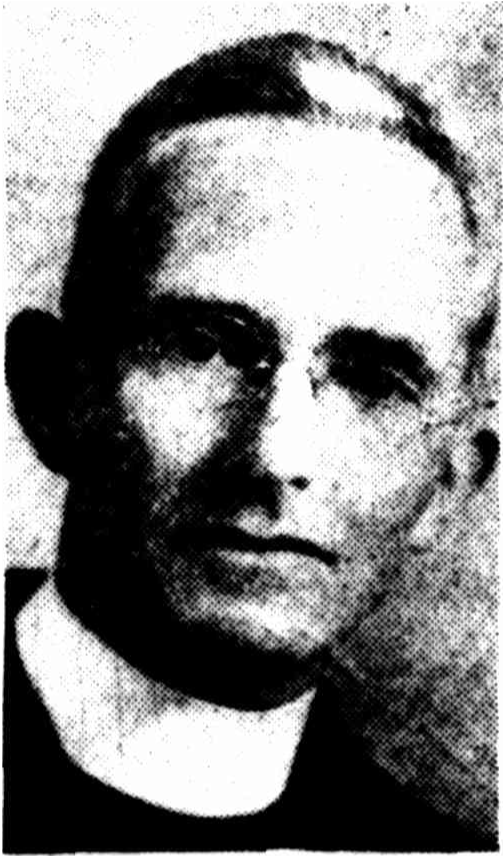
William Hilliard

The following individuals have served as Headmaster of the Trinity Grammar School:

Ordinal	Officeholder	Term start	Term end	Time in office	Notes
1	Kenneth Thorn Henderson	1913	1913	0 years	
2	William George Hilliard	1913	1916	2–3 years	
3	Arthur Alston	1916	1916	0 years	
4	Frank Archer	1917	1922	4–5 years	
5	George Edward Weeks	1923	1928	4–5 years	
6	William George Hilliard	1929	1934	4–5 years	
7	Percival William Stephenson	1935	1937	1–2 years	
8	Vernon S. Murphy	1938	1942	3–4 years	
9	James Wilson Hogg	1944	1974	29–30 years	Longest serving
10	Roderick Ian West	1975	1996	20–21 years	
11	Milton George Cujes	1996	2017	20–21 years	1968 School captain
12	Timothy Bowden	2018	incumbent	7–8 years	

== School Captains ==
Year	School Captain
1913	Mccausland, J B
1914	Anderson, R
1915	Kerrigan, A B
1916	Kerrigan, A B
1917	Kerrigan, A B
1918	Hoskins, A E R
1919	Hoskins, A E R
1920	Smith, J M
1921	Osborn, H F
1922	Burtinshaw, G B
1923	Mcclelland, H W H
1924	Laing-Peach, Jas
1925	Glover, J A
1926	Burns, N R
1927	Makram, M T
1928	Grant, L I H
1929	Wherrett, S W
1930	Gilchrist, J
1931	Pilcher, K
1932	Greer, B J K
1933	Greer, B J K
1934	Dutton, A L
1935	Marks, H N
1936	Stroud, R H
1937	Hutchinson, B W
1938	Ledgerwood, J A
1939	Ledgerwood, J
1940	Edgley, I L
1941	Edwards, M S
1942	Young, P G
1943	Angel, H R
1944	Allison, G
1945	Sandars, K L
1946	Collins, B F A
1947	Haines, W
1948	Martyn, K I
1949	Jolliffe, P S
1950	Rogerson E C
1951	Reed, G
1952	Madgwick, W W
1953	Harris, J G
1954	Gilroy, D J
1955	Cramb, A D
1956	Cramb, A D
1957	Andersen, P T
1958	Allen, M R
1959	Loy, G I
1960	Palethorpe, T H
1961	Wild, R S
1962	Back, J D
1963	Edmonds, R F
1964	Leembruggen, R T
1965	Gibson, A R
1966	Fisher, R E
1967	Christie, P J
1968	Cujes, G M
1969	Davison, I M
1970	Edwards, T
1971	Allen, R J
1972	Hibbert, S A
1973	Moffitt, R C
1974	Moore, C A
1975	Collins, P J
1976	Glover, L E
1977	Bulbrook, T R
1978	Connolly, A L
1979	Norton, R H
1980	Loxton, D H
1981	Quinn, D I
1982	Norman, RJ De B
1983	Argall, T W
1984	Shillington, W A
1985	Gregory, J M
1986	Lukabyo, A J
1987	Moffatt, N J
1988	Jenen, M P
1989	Eastway, P D A
1990	Higgins, S J
1991	Barrington-Higgs, B T
1992	Kell, J B
1993	Gibson, P G
1994	Martin, M A
1995	Gibson, J M
1996	Showyin, C R
1997	Wong, K K
1998	Higginbotham, A G
1999	Theobald, A F
2000	Schafer, L J
2001	Head, R J
2002	Moore, N E
2003	Tatam, S J M
2004	Ikeuchi, K
2005	Duchini, A M
2006	Jones, B W
2007	Constantin, H I
2008	Higginbotham, L C K
2009	O'Bree, T P B
2010	Dimarchos, N
2011	Drivas, D A
2012	Sidiropoulos, D
2013	Poologasundram, M
2014	Leva, A M
2015	Dickinson, T Y
2016	Bechara, J J
2017	Payne, K B
2018	Simpson, S
2019	Bouletos, N J
2020	Christopoulos, S
2021	Christopoulos, J
2022	Yarad, S
2023	Kong, C J
2024	Gillard, L
2025	Vo, L H K
2026	Yee, A A
2027	Nurcombe, M T

== Campuses ==
The School consists of three separate but closely linked establishments:

- A Senior (Years 10 to 12) and Middle (Years 7 to 9) School for day students, as well as a Junior School (Kindergarten to Year 6), located at Summer Hill.
- Preparatory and pre kindergarten sections (Preschool to Year 6) at Strathfield.

Attempts were made in the early 2000s towards establishing a campus in Sydney's southern suburbs. Such plans have been postponed indefinitely by the School. In 2014 the school decided to close the Outdoor Education Centre at the Pine Bluff Campus, located near Bigga, New South Wales due to the cost associated with maintaining the Outdoor Education Center in a remote location. The land that was used for the Outdoor Education Center was donated previously to the school by an old boy. In 2016 Trinity Grammar School opened a new Field Studies Centre in Woollamia, New South Wales.

In 2022, the school announced the commencement of the Renewal Project at Summer Hill. The multi-phase development began with initial construction work focused on infrastructure improvements, including a redesigned front entrance. Subsequent phases now in progress include a new four-storey building intended to provide additional general-purpose teaching spaces. This building will sit in the centre of the school campus, between Number 2 Oval and the quadrangle, and between the Sports Centre and the James Wilson Hogg Assembly Hall. It is anticipated that the project will be completed for the start of the school year in 2027.

== Facilities ==
The Trinity Grammar School senior campus is located in Summer Hill, and features a mix of old and new buildings and facilities.

Some current facilities of the school include:

- A quadrangle forms the centrepiece of the grounds, with a chapel;
- The Founders Building, containing a drama theatre, film and sound editing studios, interview rooms, staff common room, English department and the Arthur Holt Library;
- A gymnasium consisting of a fitness and weights room, three basketball courts and squash court, 2 25-metre swimming pool and a brand new 50-metre swimming pool.;
- The School of Science, housing laboratories and classrooms, also has a greenhouse on the roof;
- The Design Centre, adjacent to the School of Science, housing art classrooms, design and technology rooms and computer labs;
- The Delmar Gallery, the School's official gallery, suitably situated next to the Design Centre;
- The Roderick West School of Music Building, containing a choir room, orchestra room, band room, music-composing computer labs, a recording studio and 30 music studios;
- The New School, housing the Mathematics department, Languages Department, Geography department and Economics department;
- The James Wilson Hogg Assembly Hall, capable of seating the entire Senior School and used for formal ceremonies and assemblies;
- Three sporting ovals (one containing a 300m track and 2 outdoor basketball courts, FIFA soccer field ) and an off-campus tennis centre;
- Two underground carparks
- Junior School
- Centenary Centre consisting of an Aquatic Centre (50m Swimming Pool and Official Water Polo configured pool), Basketball Courts, and room used for examinations and meetings.
- Field Studies Centre, off campus facility for outdoor education located on the NSW South Coast.
- The Renewal Project (The upgrade of existing facilities including the New Building, Assembly Hall, accessibility upgrades to carpark, landscaping, Founders Building, School of Music and a new multipurpose pavilion)

== School song and prayer ==
Collectable Cigarette card featuring the Trinity colours and crest, c. 1920s

The school song is Detur Gloria Soli Deo, and is sung to the tune "Stuttgart" No. 200 in the Australian Hymn Book

Detur Gloria Soli deo,
Let the prayer triumphant ring;
Father, Son and Holy Spirit,
Trinity of thee we sing.

Trinitarians give the glory,
In a song of praise and joy;
For our School and her great story,
Glory give to God alone.

Students past and those now present,
Those the future years shall bring,
Detur Gloria Soli Deo,
This our own great anthem sing.

School Prayer

Heavenly Father, we ask your blessing
Upon all those who work in and for this School.
Grant us faith to grow spiritually, strength
To grow bodily and wisdom to grow intellectually,
Through Jesus Christ our Lord.
Amen.

== House system ==
Students at the Summer Hill campus are divided into sixteen houses, named after significant facets of the school's history, the four original houses were Archer, Henderson, Hilliard and School. The 16 houses in Trinity Grammar School are Archer, Dulwich, Founders, Henderson, Hilliard, Holwood, Kerrigan, Latham, Murphy, School, Stephenson, Taubman, Weeks, Wilson Hogg, Wynn Jones and Young house. School House was reserved for boarders, although leading up to the closure of the boarding program in 2019 non-boarders were placed into this house to supplement the numbers. Boys are usually put into their family house, the same house as their father or grandfather or brother. Each house has a house captain and a maximum of three house vice-captains, with the majority of houses also having an unlimited number of prefects (students cannot be both a prefect and house captain).

Each year the different houses compete for the House Cup in a variety of activities such as swimming, track and field, touch football, indoor soccer, chess, debating, music, academic, cricket, fitness challenge, dodgeball, tug of war, drama performances and quad challenge. Through these activities houses are awarded points, and at the completion of the calendar year the house with the most points wins the cup, presented at the final assembly. In the case of significant victories, such as winning the swimming carnival or track and field, each house gives three cheers (in quick succession, clockwise around the quadrangle) for the victorious house, with the victorious house giving three final cheers for the school. These cheers are led by the house officers (often aided by prefects), who typically deliver the three cheers with as much volume as can be mustered.

Wilson Hogg House is the current house championship holder (2025), the current swimming champions are Wilson Hogg House (2025,2026) and the current track and field champion is Wilson Hogg (2025).

=== Senior school ===
The senior school is divided into sixteen houses, as follows:

- Archer (Red)
- Dulwich (Sky Blue)
- Founders (Orange)
- Henderson (Gold)
- Hilliard (Purple)
- Holwood (Tan)
- Kerrigan (Lime Green)
- Latham (Black)
- Murphy (Dark green)
- School (Dark Blue)
- Stephenson (Turquoise)
- Taubman (White)
- Weeks (Mid Blue)
- Wilson Hogg (Grey)
- Wynn Jones (Bishop Pink)
- Young (Dark Pink)

=== Junior school ===
The Junior School is divided into four houses, as follows:

- Taubman (White)
- Latham (Black)
- Founders (Orange)
- Young (Maroon)

=== Preparatory school ===
The preparatory school is divided into four houses. These houses earn points towards the house cup, which is awarded at the prize giving each year. Competitions for houses include track and field, swimming, cricket, debating, rugby and academic. Each house is assigned a housemaster, who has responsibility for the direct organization of the pupils in their house. Most teachers are assigned a house, and although they have no day-to-day tasks relating to the house, they are used to provide additional control at house events. Unlike the house system at the senior school, the preparatory school houses do not have any direct impact on the academic or co-curricular aspects of the school. The houses are:

- Archer (Red)
- Henderson (Gold)
- Hilliard (Purple)
- School (Dark Blue)

=== Former houses ===
Old Junior School houses were:

- Dulwich (Sky Blue)
- Chambers [other name for Founders] (White)
- School (Dark Blue)

== Curriculum ==
=== Preparatory School ===
In 2007, the Preparatory School adopted the Primary Years Program (PYP), which was developed by the International Baccalaureate Organisation (IBO) to provide Primary school students with a platform from which they can develop their education in preparation for the International Baccalaureate. This provides a separate program for learning, but this is the framework for the teaching of Maths, English, Computer Studies, Physical Education, Visual Arts and Music. Students learn Mandarin Chinese from Year 3, at the beginning of Primary School, and continue this up until the time they leave Preparatory School. The School is currently in the second phase of accreditation as a PYP school.

=== Middle and Senior Schools ===
Trinity offers both the NSW Higher School Certificate (HSC) and International Baccalaureate Diploma Program (IB) for Year 11 and 12 students. Boys in the HSC and the IB, while being able to interact with each other through the House/Pastoral and Sport/Curriculum systems, are taught separately, due to the differing nature of the two curricula.

Despite its relative success, however, the IB Middle Years Program (MYP) has not been introduced into the Middle School. Both the PYP and the MYP are specifically designed for an introduction into the IB, and, due to the popularity of the IB among students, there is a chance that the MYP will be brought into the Middle School in years to come, although the School has neither confirmed nor denied this.

==== Sport ====
Trinity Grammar School is a member of the Combined Associated Schools (CAS), and through this association competes with other members of the CAS as well as Independent Schools Association and GPS member schools. Sporting activities offered include Australian rules football, basketball, chess, cricket, cross country, diving, fencing, football (soccer), golf, lawn bowls, rugby, snow sports, squash, swimming, table tennis, tennis, touch football, track and field (athletics), volleyball, and water polo.

== Controversies ==
In 1971 a Trinity student sued the school and one of its masters, claiming that he had been caned excessively. Colin Morris, 15, said that his buttocks were sore for three days, and bruised for three weeks, after receiving six strokes of the cane. The judge threw the case out, saying that the punishment had been reasonable, and added, "The salutary effect of the infliction of pain on a schoolboy, experience might show, justifies the reasonable use of this form of chastisement on healthy teenage boys."

Between 1984 and 1988, a senior school Mathematics teacher, Mr R. Doyle, was accused of sexually abusing two students who had been undertaking private tutoring with him on school grounds. Mr Doyle eventually pleaded guilty and was sentenced in 1997, long after his dismissal from the school.

In 2000, a group of Year 10 boarding students were charged with sexually assaulting two students more than 75 times, including with a collection of wooden dildos made in a woodwork class, one of which was called the "Anaconda". Witnesses testified that the assaults often took place during lunch hour, and they "often heard screaming from the dormitory". Three students were expelled by the school and convicted of various offences as minors. Compensation payments to two victims of bullying at the school are likely to have been approximately $1 million. It was alleged that the school had a culture of bullying A film loosely based on the incident, Boys Grammar, was produced in 2005. Academics now quote this case, and the school's attempts to minimise public awareness and perceived damage to it, in studies in this area.

Trinity's plan to bulldoze twelve of the seventeen houses it owns bordering the school grounds, in order to build a swimming pool, multi-purpose hall, classroom block and underground carpark, was approved by the NSW Land and Environment Court in November 2007. The single Ashfield Councillor who supported the application was an alumnus of the school, and described his fellow Councillors as "envious" and "a pathetic bunch of people".

In January 2016, the school was brought to prominence as a result of allegations of "sexualised behaviour" that occurred at the conclusion of 2015, between Year 1 students of the school. The allegations involved sexual acts being performed by students, whilst unsupervised during school hours, in the school toilets and playground. The Department of Family and Community Services was brought in to investigate the matter after the school was contacted by a concerned parent of one of the alleged victims.

In January 2017, former teacher Neil Futcher was sentenced to 18 years and 4 months' jail, with a non-parole period of 11 years, for 22 child sex offences committed against six students between 1974 and 1981.

In August 2020, police arrested English teacher Alexander Simpson in front of students and charged him with sending indecent material to a person under 16 and soliciting child abuse material. Detectives from the NSW Police child abuse unit had posed as a 13-year-old girl online, and alleged that he sent explicit images and messages to the undercover police whilst at work. He was later sentenced to 24 months in prison, but released under a recognisance order as he was the sole carer for his wife, who lived with a disability.

== Alumni ==
Old Trinitarians' Union Logo

Alumni of Trinity Grammar School are known as Old Trinitarians and automatically gain membership members of the school's Alumni Association, the Old Trinitarians Union. Through the Old Trinitarians Union, Old Boys regularly compete against current students in various sports such as cricket, volleyball and basketball, with the winner of the overall competition given the Jubilee Cup on Speech Day, with the President of the OTU collecting it on behalf of the old boys and the School Captain collecting it on behalf of the School.

== See also ==
- List of Anglican schools in New South Wales
- Anglican education in Australia
- Lawrence Campbell Oratory Competition
