= Kevin Kearney =

Australian producer

Kevin Kearney (born 22 August 1936 in Campsie, New South Wales) is an Australian analogue location sound recordist, film producer, director, actor and digital producer, director and editor.

== Early life ==
Kearney was born 22 August 1936 at Canterbury Hospital in Campsie.

Kearney was the third child of Kathleen and Jack Kearney. Kearney's paternal and maternal families arrived in Australia from Ireland in the mid-1800s. His mother and father were born in March and January, 1898 respectively. Kearney's maternal grandfather, Bernard Reilly was elected as an alderman to the first Crookwell Shire Council in 1905 Kearney's parents married in May 1924 at St Mary's Cathedral, Sydney.

Kearney grew up in Bondi. In February 1942, Kearney became a student at Waverley College in Waverley, where he remained for the next fifteen years.

In December 1957 Kearney travelled to the Australian Outback and worked on the Alice Springs to Darwin road. During this time, he was invited to corroborees by the Mutitjulu elders of the Anangu people of the regions.

== Television career ==
In 1962, Kearney began working at the Australian Broadcasting Corporation in Gore Hill. His first job at ABC-TV was as a propsman on Mr Squiggle and Miss Gina (Gina Curtis). Concurrent with Mr Squiggle, he worked on The Bryan Davies Show.

In 1964, Kearney became assistant floor manager on My Brother Jack (1965), based on George Johnston's novel. In 1966, Kearney was floor manager and assistant floor manager on the children's program Play School. That same year, he worked as assistant floor manager and studio hand on Australian Playhouse and as studio hand on Duke Ellington at ABC-TV (1966). In 1967, Kearney worked in staging on Contrabandits (1967) and was floor manager and assistant floor manager on Four Corners (1967).

Kearney resigned from ABC-TV in October 1967 and on 11 November 1967 joined the production of the TV series Riptide. He began this series as a boom operator and later became a sound recordist. In 1969, Kearney left Riptide to become perhaps Australia's first freelancer in its analogue film industry with Graham Jennings as his first agent.

=== Television ===
- Mr Squiggle (1959–1989) – propsman
- The Bryan Davies Show (1981–1982) propsman
- My Brother Jack (1965) – floor manager
- Cinderella – The Opera (1965) – studio hand
- Play School – floor manager / assistant floor manager
- Australian Playhouse (1966) – assistant floor manager / studio hand
- Duke Ellington @ ABC-TV (1966) – studio hand
- Contrabandits (1967) – staging
- Four Corners – assistant floor / assistant floor manager / studio hand
- Riptide (1967–1969) – sound recordist / boom operator
- Skippy the Bush Kangaroo (1967–1969) – second sound recordist
- Woobinda, Animal Doctor (1968–1969) – second sound recordist

== Theatre ==
Concurrent with his TV work, Kearney also worked at John Clugson's Staging Factory, Paddington. While working at Clugson's, Kearney was asked to join the Executive of Doris Fitton's Independent Theatre in North Sydney as stage manager. He worked there for four years with senior producer Peter Summerton, producer Michael Lake, publicist Jone Winchester and stage director John Whitham. Kearney also provided playback sound for "Action Poetry on Stage" a poetry reading at the Pact Theatre, Pyrmont.

In 1969, Kearney formed Zoom Productions and then Lighthouse Productions with Val Hodgson and Gordon Mutch, staging light shows at The Roundhouse at the University of New South Wales. The same group then worked on Sights and Sounds of '69 at the Sydney Town Hall, which Kearney produced and directed. The show featured music by Tully, John Sangster Jazz Group, Susan Prendergast, Alan Moarywaala Barker, Lindsay Bourke and Dave MacRae.

=== The Independent Theatre ===
- Aladdin (1963) – Stage Manager
- Dylan (1963) – Stage Manager
- The Aspern Papers – Stage Manager
- The Marriage of Mr Mississippi (1965) – Stage Manager* "An Evening with Moel Coward"(1965) – Stage Manager
- After the Fall

=== The Q Theatre ===
- Sunday at the Q (1964) – Stage Manager

=== The Lane Cove Musical Society ===
- The White Horse Inn (1964) – Staging
- HMAS Pinafore (1964) – Staging
- The Mikado (1964) – Staging

=== Pact Theatre ===
- Action Poetry on Stage (1969) – Playback Recordist

=== Sydney Town Hall ===
- Sights & Sounds of '69 (1969) – Producer / Director

== Films ==
Kearney's first film was producer Graham Jennings 1970 film Silo 15 . He was then booked as the second boom operator for second sound recordist Hans Wetzel on producers Lee Robinson and Dennis Hill's 1969 film The Intruders.

Kearney then produced and directed Headland '69 with director / cinematographer Stanley Dalby. The film featured Andrew Fleming and Gillian Anderson]. The film was featured in a work print format at "Sights & Sounds of '69" at the Sydney Town Hall. The film included the music of the band Tully from the concert.

For the 1971 film Walkabout, Kearney worked as boom operator for sound recordist Barry Brown and also worked as second sound recordist when required.

=== Films ===
- Silo 15 (1969) – feature – boom operator
- The Intruders (1969) – feature – second sound recordist
- Headlands '69 (1970) – feature – producer / director/ sound design
- Walkabout (1970) – feature – boom operator – second sound recordist

Films on which Kevin Kearney was Producer / Director / Camera

- Stoned View of Asia (1970) Director / Camera / Sound Design
- International Women's Day 1975 (1975) Producer / Sound Design
- Makeup (1977) Sound Design
- Nyoman Gunarsa (1978) Producer / Sound Design
- Big Time in Nelson (1983) Producer / Sound Design
- Waiting for Djuarn (1999) Director / Camera / Sound Design
- JTs Birthday (2000) Director / Camera / Sound Design
- Take Your Time (2002) Director / Camera / Sound Design
- Lietelinna (2002) Producer / Camera / Sound Design
- Secrets of the Kitchen (2003) Director / Camera / Sound Design
- Watch Out There's a Dugong About (2004) Director / Camera / Sound Design
- When I'm 64 with Preston Warne (2004) Director / Camera / Sound Design
- Quandamooka (2005) Producer / Director / Camera / Sound Design
- Time with Barry Brown (2006) Producer / Co-camera / Sound Design
- I Hate Doors (2005) Director / Camera / Sound Design
- Honeymoon Sweet (2006) Director / Camera / Sound Design
- The Faces of Ms Zsa Zsa (2010) Director / Camera / Sound Design

See IMDb for further list of features, documentaries, telemovies, series, shorts and music videos that Kevin Kearney has worked on.

== Commercials ==
During the above period Kevin Kearney completed 3,000 commercials as sound recordist / boom operator

== Writing ==
=== Stage plays ===
- Ceres of Events (1966)

=== Television ===
- The High Life (1968) Riptide Episode – uncredited
- An Island Unto Himsel (1968) Riptide Episode – uncredited

=== Screenplays ===
- White Angel (1965) an adaptation from an original short story "White Angel" by Ned McCann
- Republic (1992) – feature film

== Acting ==
- Nightwait (1966) – Milkbar Customer – Director Stanley Dalby
- 4 Eyes Fastest Gun (1966) – Deputy Sheriff – Director Gary Shead
