= Douglas Armati =

Australian writer, researcher, consultant, business executive and technical diplomat

- Born: 1950 (age 74–75)

Douglas Armati (born 1950) is an Australian writer, researcher, consultant, business development executive and technical diplomat.

Doug Armati undertook research work on digital copyright issues at Murdoch University in Western Australia in 1990–91 before taking a role in international efforts to standardize the identification of digital objects.

After a speech on the importance and potential economic benefits of uniform approach to identification of digitized copyright content to the International Association of Scientific, Technical, and Medical Publishers at the Frankfurt Book Fair in October 1994 he wrote two pivotal reports in 1995 – the first for the STM group on Information Identification and the second for the Association of American Publishers on Uniform File Identifiers. Armati's work for these global publishing bodies was an important catalyst for the birth of the Digital Object Identifier Foundation.

His 1996 speech at the joint ICSU/UNESCO Electronic Publishing in Science conference in Paris on "Tools and standards for protection, control and archiving" and his book later that year on "Intellectual Property in Electronic Environments" both helped frame the legal, scientific and technical debate in the emerging field of digital rights management. Armati was also part of the digital copyright experts group that worked closely with the World Intellectual Property Organization in the period leading up to the ratification of the WIPO Copyright Treaty in December 1996.

In 1996 Armati joined InterTrust Technologies, the leading company in the then nascent field of digital rights management, where he was a member of the leadership group through the company's 1999 IPO until its sale to Sony and Philips in early 2003.

During his time with InterTrust, Armati was also active in international standards groups, having been a vice-chairman of the Recording Industry Association of America's international Secure Digital Music Initiative, a board member of the Open eBook Forum (now the International Digital Publishing Forum) and a significant contributor to the Moving Picture Experts Group (MPEG), particularly in the development of a standard for the management and protection of intellectual property in MPEG-4, MPEG-7 and MPEG-21.
