= St Aloysius' College (Sydney) =

Location
- Kirribilli Sydney, New South Wales (Years 3–8, 10–12); Rozelle, Sydney, New South Wales (Year 9); Australia; 33°50′55″S 151°12′52″E

Information
- Other name: Aloys
- Type: Independent academically selective primary and secondary day school
- Motto: Latin: Ad Majora Natus (Born for Greater Things)
- Religious affiliation: Roman Catholic
- Denomination: Jesuits
- Established: 1879; 147 years ago
- Founder: Joseph Dalton SJ
- Sister school: Loreto Kirribilli
- Chairman: Mark Lennon
- Rector: Ross Jones SJ
- Principal: John Browne
- Staff: 210
- Teaching staff: 116.7 FTE (2025)
- Years: 3–12
- Gender: Boys
- Enrolment: 1,347 (2025)
- Colors: Blue and Gold
- Affiliations: Association of Heads of Independent Schools of Australia; Junior School Heads Association of Australia; Combined Associated Schools
- Website: www.staloysius.nsw.edu.au www.strategy.staloysius.college

St Aloysius' College is an independent Catholic primary and secondary day school for boys, located in Kirribilli, on the Lower North Shore of Sydney, New South Wales, Australia.

Founded in 1879 by Joseph Dalton SJ at St Kilda House, Woolloomooloo, St Aloysius' is the oldest independent Catholic boys day school in New South Wales. The College is conducted in the Jesuit tradition by the Society of Jesus as part of a worldwide network of schools and universities, which Ignatius of Loyola, the founder of the Order, began in Messina, Sicily, in 1548. The College has an academically selective enrolment policy and as of 2019 catered to approximately 1,251 students from Year 3 to Year 12 (7 to 18 years).

St Aloysius' is affiliated with the Association of Heads of Independent Schools of Australia (AHISA), the Junior School Heads Association of Australia (JSHAA), and is the oldest of the six schools which make up the Combined Associated Schools (CAS).

== History ==
=== Foundation ===
Following the 1877 closure of Lyndhurst school, a Roman Catholic school for boys in Glebe, there was no Catholic college for boys in the area. Roger Bede Vaughan, the second Catholic Archbishop of Sydney, was petitioned by the community to set up a school; Joseph Dalton was sent to Sydney by the Superior, Cahill, in answer to a request from Vaughan.

Towards the end of 1878, Dr Dalton returned to Sydney with Kennedy to seek a site, first for a city day school and later, if possible, a site for a boarding school. After much discussion and searching, a property known as "St Kilda House" on the corner of Cathedral Street and Palmer Street in Woolloomooloo was rented at £260 per annum. The property had been built in 1844 by Charles Scott on part of a grant made to John Palmer, purser on the First Fleet ship HMS Sirius, it was a Georgian style mansion with fifteen rooms. The building has since been demolished.

St Kilda House was blessed by the Archbishop and its first 45 pupils admitted on 3 February 1879. By the end of 1879, enrolments had increased to 115.

=== Darlinghurst ===
It soon became clear that the school site and its surroundings were not ideal for a college. The students had been experiencing transport difficulties and the children of the local area resented the intrusion of "college boys", expressing themselves accordingly. Subsequently, in September 1883, the College moved to a property known as "Auburn Villa" in Bourke Street, Darlinghurst, with classes resuming on 17 September. This property had been purchased from the Iredale family for £6,975, and though the house had just eleven rooms, the area offered considerable advantages. The name "Auburn Villa" was changed on purchase to St Aloysius, the patron of youth, and a new wing was built shortly after at a cost of £5,000. The building was later demolished to make way for St Margaret's Maternity Hospital.

Student numbers grew considerably towards the end of the century. In letters to the Jesuit Superior, Rectors constantly pleaded for more staff, telling of their constant financial struggle to exist.

=== Milsons Point ===
Across Sydney Harbour, the Society of Jesus had taken control of the parish of St Mary's, North Sydney. A small, stone church in Jeffrey Street, Kirribilli, built in 1863 by Congregationalists, Wesleyans and Anglicans had fallen into disuse due to lack of a congregation. This church was purchased by the Jesuits in 1880 to serve the district of Kirribilli and Milsons Point, but the priests at North Sydney were finding it difficult to attend to their large parish. Cardinal Moran, Archbishop of Sydney, urged the Jesuits to move the College from Bourke Street to a site near the church in order to give regular service to the Catholics of the area.

In 1902, a property adjoining the church was rented for £225 and a few years later purchased for £4,500. The area was small – about three-quarters of an acre, however, the building with a crenellated tower and lace iron balconies was set in picturesque surroundings and featured an uninterrupted view of the harbour. St Aloysius' College officially commenced classes here on 2 February 1903, with fewer than 50 students.

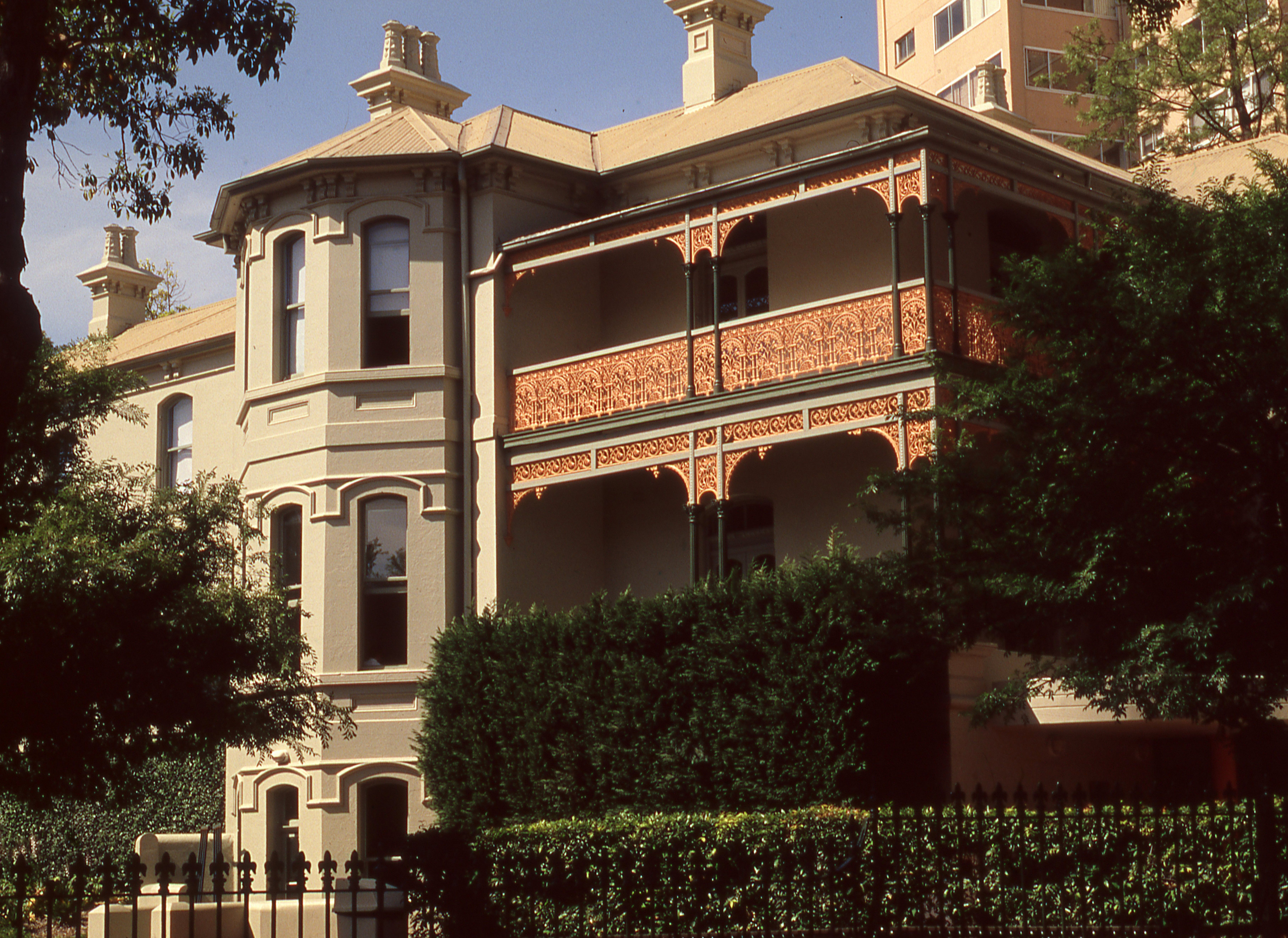
Wyalla, St Aloysius' College

Before long enrolments again increased and additional accommodation became an urgent need. A wooden building was hastily erected, housing classrooms and study hall until it was replaced in 1907/1908 by a three-storeyed brick building later known as the "Junior School". As student numbers increased, additional rooms again became necessary and in 1913/1914 a new wing was constructed on the eastern side of the original residence. In 1916, a property opposite the College, known as "Wyalla", came on the market. Money was eventually borrowed and Wyalla became the "Senior School". As with most schools, war casualties among old boys were heavy.

In the early 1920s, a property off Sailors Bay Road, Northbridge, was purchased as a site for much-needed playing fields. This property remained undeveloped due to the lack of excavating and levelling techniques and machinery at the time. Had this plan materialised, it would today be a very valuable asset, however, it was sold in 1939 and provided finance for the purchase of some market gardens in Tyneside Avenue, Willoughby East, which forms the current College Sports Ground.

The war years brought a significant drop in numbers at St. Aloysius, and the College was forced to pile sandbags to prevent blasts from anticipated Japanese bombs, and strong, wooden fortifications were constructed to prevent roofs collapsing. Following the war, the number of pupils increased more rapidly than the development of accommodation, and by the late fifties, it was clear that a major decision on the College's future was no longer avoidable. There appeared to be only three available options: one was to close down the College gradually, a rather unpopular choice, however, had it proved to be the only possible one, the machinery was ready to implement it; The second was to find another suitable site in the vicinity and to make a fresh start. No site comparable with the present one was available, and subsequently part of the Jesuit owned property in Pymble was suggested as a possible location. The financial commitment involved in such a move was more than the College could carry. An invitation came from Archbishop Eris O'Brien to move the College to Canberra where 20 acres (81,000 m^{2}) and financial assistance were available, however, after much debate this offer was turned down; The third possible option was to stay at Milsons Point and to re-develop the site. The representative of the Jesuit General, John McMahon, who was then visiting Australia, and the Provincial Superior, Jeremiah Hogan, favoured this option as being in the best interests of the Catholic community and of the College.

In 1961, with the help of Mr G J Dusseldorp, the co-operation of the Commonwealth Bank and the support of Hogan, the College began the task of rebuilding. The limitations of the site and the fact that existing buildings could not be demolished beforehand, restricted the Rector, John Casey, in his plan and the architect, Mr Robert Metcalfe, in his design. In approximately ten years, with the support of the College community, four stages of construction were completed. A notable change in design was the alteration of the Campus' main hall, named "the Great Hall". The initial intent for this space was to be a theatre or concert hall. This was forgone and instead made to be a basketball court, much to the dismay of the music society of the school. Had the original design gone through it would have been a noticeably large recital space. In spite of this plan not having come to fruition, the evidence of it is visible in the architecture of the inside of the Hall.

To celebrate its centenary in 1979, the College began the fifth and final building stage. It involved demolishing the freestanding former church built in 1863 and used by various denominations until the Jesuits obtained the building in 1903 to be used as a parish church and named it Star of the Sea. Its use as the school chapel was discontinued in 1965 when the current chapel, named the College Chapel, was constructed as the second stage of the rebuilding. It was built as a modern chapel and completely designed in the spirit of the Vatican II reforms. The original chapel had acted as an art room until 1981 when it was demolished. The stone of it was reused to form the eastern wall of the playground and the evidence of the original church can be seen by the statue of Mary that is seen among the vegetation.

The new buildings evident from this final stage include the new housing administration, entrance gates, canteen, library, study room, community rooms, and classrooms, was opened in 1981. Despite the completion of this stage, there was still insufficient room to house the College. For some years, assisted by the proposal of building the Harbour Tunnel, investigations were undertaken to see if it was possible to again move. In 1991, a decision was reached to purchase the Milsons Point Primary School and to develop a Junior School Campus. Construction of the Junior School Campus commenced in 1992, and in 1993 it was blessed and opened.

In order to provide more space for the College, the Jesuit community left the main building for a community house in Jeffrey Street in 1995. The top two floors were renovated to accommodate Year 12, while renovations for a new Senior School on the Wyalla site took place. At the commencement of the school year in 1997, the Senior School, accommodating Years 11 and 12 was opened and blessed by the Governor-General of Australia, Sir William Deane, the provincial of the Society of Jesus, Daven Day SJ and the Auxiliary Bishop of Sydney, David Cremin DD.

In 2002, the St Aloysius College Foundation successfully purchased the choir organ in St Joseph's Basilica in Edmonton, Alberta, Canada after good fortune brought the news of its sale to the College. This was fortunate because by the late 1990s the previous organ, constructed in 1969 by James P. Eagles, had become unreliable and found to be inadequate for the demands placed upon it. The reason for this was undetermined however the likely theory is that it was old and, being of electronic action, likely obsolete. In the same year of its purchase, the new organ was successfully dismantled, moved and reassembled in Australia by Pitchford and Garside. Unfortunately, this was the last project undertaken by the late Stuart Garside due to his saddening untimely pass on site, just as the installation reached its completion. The Eagles organ was sold privately and removed shortly afterwards. Credit for the successful installation of the organ goes to many including the College Foundation for financing the project, Mr Peter Kneeshaw the Organ Consultant for the project and Mr Michael Hissey the Director of Music at the time. Upon completion of the project, it was easily found that the organ had found a good home, with the extreme height of the case fitting neatly under the ceiling with a few centimetres to spare, a live acoustic and, most importantly, a number of talented people who use it daily. Such uses include accompaniment of whole school masses, which at some times numbers to over 1000 people. It is also used for private lessons for keen individuals and as a practice instrument for said individuals to continually improve. It is also occasionally used for external organ examinations and competitions.

=== Rozelle Campus (SACR) ===
In 2020, the past principal, Mark Tannock, who is now the head principal of St. Ignatius Riverview, proposed to move all Year 9 students to a campus in Rozelle, as a part of Plan Magis. In 2023, the proposition was planned to go ahead but the move was later delayed by 1 Term, as construction moved slower than anticipated. The Year 9 students are now staying at Rozelle, becoming a permanent campus of St Aloysius College. It became known generally as SACR (St Aloysius College Rozelle). This establishment has become a permanent part of the Aloysius experience, providing different teaching styles to the main campus. This aims to make sure students in Year 9 stay dedicated to their learning. Part of the Rozelle experience is a camp, a retreat, dance with Loreto and other activities with schools such as St. Scholastica's. The Rozelle experience also includes alternative subjects including Human Stories (English, Religion and History), The World Around Us (Science and Geography), and Contemplatives in Action (CIA - an additional elective path).

=== Head of school ===
In the early days, Jesuit colleges were headed by a Rector, who was also a Superior of the Jesuit community. The Rector was assisted by a Prefect of Studies, who attended to the day-to-day running of the school, especially concerning the curriculum and discipline. In the Australian Province, the 1970s saw the role of Headmaster become separated from that of Superior. Rectors and Superiors normally have a fixed term in canon law of six years; Headmasters' terms are indefinite. In 2003, the structure returned to the older dispensation, with the title of Prefect of Studies replaced with Principal. 2014 saw the appointment of the College's first-ever lay principal with Mark Tannock being appointed to the role following the end of Chris Middleton's tenure. This break in tradition was due to the increased strain on Jesuit responsibilities due to the ongoing decrease in. On 7 March 2024, Mr Mark Tannock announced that he will transition into the principal role at Saint Ignatius' College, Riverview at the end of the 2024 calendar year.

Ordinal	Officeholder	Term start	Term end	Time in office	Notes
Rector
2	Daniel Clancy SJ	1880	1889	8–9 years	
3	Charles Morrough SJ	1890	1893	2–3 years	
4	Christopher Nulty SJ	1893	1903	9–10 years	
5	Thomas Fay SJ	1903	1910	6–7 years	
6	Patrick McCurtin SJ	1910	1916	5–6 years	
7	John Forster SJ	1916	1921	4–5 years	
8	Francis Xavier O'Brien SJ	1921	1930	8–9 years	
9	Austin Kelly SJ	1930	1937	6–7 years	
10	Noel Hehir SJ	1937	1939	1–2 years	
11	Thomas Hehir SJ	1939	1944	4–5 years	
(8)	Francis Xavier O'Brien SJ	1944	1948	3–4 years	
12	John Casey SJ	1948	1949	0–1 years	
13	Donald Roset SJ	1949	1954	4–5 years	
(12)	John Casey SJ	1954	1961	6–7 years	
14	Vincent Conway SJ	1961	1968	6–7 years	
15	Thomas O'Donovan SJ	1968	1973	4–5 years	
Headmaster
16	Gregory Jordan SJ	1974	1977	2–3 years	
17	Robert Bruce SJ	1978	1985	6–7 years	
18	Anthony Smith SJ	1986	2002	15–16 years	
19	Ross Jones SJ	2003	2010	6–7 years	^{[note a]}
20	Peter Hosking SJ	2011	2017	5–6 years	^{[note a]}
(19)	Ross Jones SJ	2018	incumbent	5–6 years	^{[note a]}
Principal
21	Chris Middleton SJ	2003	2014	10–11 years	^{[note a]}
22	Mark Tannock	2014	2024	9–10 years	^{[note a]}
23	Kate Quinane	2025	2025	0–1 year	^{[note a]}
24	John Browne	2026	incumbent		^{[note a]}

^[note a]: From 2003 until 2018, the roles of Headmaster and Principal were appointed concurrently.

== Jesuit education ==
St Aloysius' College is conducted by the Jesuit Order and is part of a worldwide network of approximately 1000 Jesuit primary and secondary schools and universities. The first school was commenced by St. Ignatius Loyola, the founder of the Order, in 1548.

A Jesuit education stresses the acquisition of skills and techniques in a purposeful and balanced perspective. While emphasis is placed on the development of intellectual and mental skills, attention is also given to other aspects of personal formation, such as character, attitudes, values and social interaction.

The aim of a Jesuit education is as follows: "Our ideal is the well-rounded person who is intellectually competent, open to growth, religious, loving and committed to doing justice in generosity to the people of God."

Its brother schools include Saint Ignatius' College, Riverview and Loyola College, Mount Druitt in Sydney, Saint Ignatius' College, Adelaide in Athelstone and Xavier College in Melbourne.

== Sport ==
St Aloysius' College is a member of the Combined Associated Schools (CAS).

=== CAS premierships ===
St Aloysius' College has won the following CAS premierships.

- Basketball (2) – 1999, 2022
- Cricket – 1990
- Cross Country – 2007
- Rugby (3) – 1933, 1972, 1978
- Soccer – 2017
- Swimming (2) – 1932, 1935
- Tennis Summer (5) – 2008, 2009, 2010, 2011, 2022
- Tennis Winter (4) – 2009, 2010, 2011, 2019
- Volleyball Summer (3) – 2004, 2010, 2011
- Water Polo (4) – 2009, 2010, 2016, 2019

== Notable alumni ==
Alumni of St Aloysius' are known as Old Boys and may elect to join the school's alumni association, the St. Aloysius' College Old Boys' Union (SACOBU). These Old Boys have access to many services and opportunities at St Aloysius College, forever part of the community.

== See also ==
- List of Catholic schools in New South Wales
- Catholic education in Australia
- List of Jesuit schools
