= Bo Seo =

Korean-Australian debater and journalist

- Born: Bo H. Seo
- Education: Harvard University; Tsinghua University
- Occupations: Journalist; author

Bo H. Seo is a South Korean-Australian journalist, author, and two time world debating champion, having won both the World Universities Debating Championship in 2016 and the World Schools Debating Championships in 2013 where Seo captained the Australian debate team to a first place finish for the first time in 7 years and placed as the highest speaker in the tournament. Seo is the author of Good Arguments, a book about how skills transferred from debating can be applied to public discourse and personal relationships.

== Early life ==
Seo moved with his family from South Korea to Australia when he was 8 years old. At the time, he spoke very little English. He graduated from Barker College in Sydney in 2012.

== Career ==
Before studying at Harvard, he won the World Schools Debating Championships (WSDC) in 2013 while competing for Australia. While studying for his undergraduate degree at Harvard University, he won the 2016 Thessaloniki World Universities Debating Championship (WUDC) with his partner Fanele Mashwama, and he would go on to serve as coach for both the Harvard College Debating Union and Australian debate team. He subsequently earned a masters in public policy from Tsinghua University as a Schwarzman scholar. In 2018, he became a trainee journalist at Australian Financial Review. In 2022, he published his first book, Good Arguments: What the art of debating can teach us about listening better and disagreeing well.
