= Combined Associated Schools =

Group of six independent schools in Sydney

The Associated Schools of NSW Inc.
- Formation: 1929
- Headquarters: Sydney, Australia
- Members: St. Aloysius College; Barker College; Cranbrook School; Knox Grammar; Trinity Grammar; Waverley College
- Official language: English
- Website: www.cas.nsw.edu.au

The Associated Schools of NSW Inc, most commonly referred to as the Committee of Associated Schools (CAS), is a group of six independent schools located in Sydney, which share common interests, ethics, educational philosophy and contest sporting events between themselves. In addition, CAS members often compete with members of the Athletic Association of the Great Public Schools of New South Wales (GPS) and members of the Independent Sporting Association (ISA).

== History ==
The CAS was initiated in 1928 by Knox Grammar School's first headmaster, Neil MacNeil, when he proposed an association with Barker College, Cranbrook School, Trinity Grammar School, All Saints' College and St Aloysius' College.

The association was formed in 1929 to provide sporting and co-curricular competition with the foundation members being the above schools with the exception of All Saints', who were not mentioned again. Waverley College had its application of June 1929 deferred until it finally joined in the 1940s. This was because the headmaster of Trinity Grammar School throughout the 1930s came to an impasse with Waverley headmaster at the time, Br Edward Nelson, over school fee issues. This issue questioned the integrity of the school and the application was held up until 1941. At this point in time Waverley had a new headmaster, Br Andrew Denman.

The CAS primarily provides sporting competitions between the various schools, including swimming and athletics, the summer sports cricket and basketball, and the winter sports rugby union, football (soccer), and cross country. CAS also offers a wide range of cultural activities such as cadet competitions, chess, debating and public speaking. Since 1935, a representative from each CAS and GPS school has competed in the Lawrence Campbell Oratory Competition.

Representatives from all six schools meet regularly to determine sporting schedules, school terms, competitions and address any issues arising from the CAS competition.

Sydney Grammar School often participates in debating competitions and some sport (mainly volleyball) hosted by the CAS board.

Tony Higgins, dean of careers at Knox Grammar School, manages the employment relations aspect of the association. John Day and Roger Seaborn, members of the Trinity Grammar School Council, also form part of this committee and are responsible for the day-to-day operation of the CAS. August Courtis is in charge of the Public Relations Department.

The meeting of the representatives of the CAS in April 2006 saw the introduction of a cadet drill competition, suggested by Helen Clarke of Knox Grammar School and Gordon Barkl of the Barker College School Council. This was intended to further enhance the links between the six CAS schools. In June 2006, the CAS committee initiated the first joint-scholarship programme for academic performance. Awarded annually, the student attaining the scholarship is granted six years of secondary education at any of the six CAS schools.

The annual meeting of the CAS committee in April 2007 saw the introduction of lawn bowls as an official CAS sport through the initiative of Pete Mullers and Chantal Hunter of the Waverley College sport department. The event also saw the proposal of the introduction of a common teaching/learning program in the academic side of each of the six participating schools. The program has been drafted by Shane Sedgman and Jenny Emery of Knox Grammar School. The head of the CAS committee, Dougal Parr, also announced his decision to step down from his position and was replaced by his deputy, Edward Bradshaw.

On 4 May 2007, English faculty executives from the six CAS schools attended a conference held at Knox Grammar School to commence the drafting of a common learning program. Headed by the dean of English of Knox Grammar School and Barker College, Steve Parsons and Ann Lawless Bean, assessment tasks, examinations and teaching schedules were devised for the academic year commencing 2008. The mathematics department attended a similar seminar on 7 May 2007 and was headed by Michael Harnwell and Ian Schultz.

== Schools ==
=== Member schools ===
Crest	School	Location	Enrolment	Founded	Denomination	Co-Ed	Day/Boarding	Year Entered Competition	School Colors
	St Aloysius' College	Milsons Point	1,200	1879	Catholic	No	Day	1929	Gold and blue
	Barker College	Hornsby	2,700	1890	Anglican	Yes	Day & boarding	1929	Navy and red
	Cranbrook School	Bellevue Hill	1,600	1918	Anglican	Yes	Day & boarding	1929	Red, white and navy
	Knox Grammar School	Wahroonga	3,200	1924	Uniting Church	No	Day & boarding	1929	Black and royal blue
	Trinity Grammar School	Summer Hill	2,200	1913	Anglican	No	Day	1929	Dark green and white
	Waverley College	Waverley	1,500	1903	Catholic	No	Day	1944	Royal blue and gold

== Competitive events ==
- Athletics
- Basketball
- Chess
- Cadets
- Cricket
- Cross country
- Fishing
- Rifle shooting
- Rugby union
- Football (Soccer)
- Swimming
- Volleyball
- Water polo
- Squash
- Tennis
- Debating
- Lawn bowls
- Diving

CAS full code

== Champions ==
Year	Athletics	Cricket	Swimming	Rugby	Basketball	Football	Debating	Cross country	Cadet Drill	Military skills	Chess	Volleyball
1929	Knox											
1930	Cranbrook	Barker		Cranbrook								
1931	Knox	Trinity		Cranbrook								
1932	Trinity	Barker	St Aloysius'	Knox								
1933	Knox	Trinity	Knox	Cranbrook; St Aloysius'								
1934	Cranbrook	Barker	Knox	Knox								
1935	Knox	Cranbrook St Aloysius'	Trinity									
1936	Cranbrook	Knox	Trinity	Knox								
1937	Knox	Barker	Trinity	Trinity								
1938	Knox	Trinity	Trinity	Trinity								
1939	Knox	Barker; Trinity	Knox	Knox								
1940	Trinity	Knox	Barker	Knox								
1941	Trinity	Knox	Knox	Knox								
1942			Cranbrook	Knox								
1943	Cranbrook	Cranbrook		Cranbrook								
1944	Waverley		Cranbrook	Waverley								
1945	Waverley		Cranbrook	Knox								
1946	Barker		Barker	Waverley								
1947	Waverley		Knox	Waverley								
1948	Barker		Knox	Waverley								
1949	Waverley		Cranbrook	Barker								
1950	Waverley		Cranbrook	Waverley								
1951	Cranbrook		Waverley	Waverley								
1952	Cranbrook		Waverley	Waverley								
1953	Waverley		Trinity	Trinity; Waverley								
1954	Waverley		Trinity	Knox								
1955	Trinity		Cranbrook	Waverley								
1956	Waverley		Trinity	Trinity								
1957	Knox		Trinity	Knox; Waverley								
1958	Waverley		Waverley	Waverley								
1959	Knox		Knox	Waverley								
1960	Waverley		Waverley	Cranbrook								
1961	Knox		Waverley	Waverley								
1962	Knox		Waverley	Trinity								
1963	Waverley		Knox	Waverley								
1964	Waverley		Trinity	Knox; Trinity								
1965	Waverley		Trinity	Waverley								
1966	Knox		Trinity	Waverley								
1967	Knox		Knox	Knox								
1968	Knox		Knox	Waverley								
1969	Knox		Knox	Cranbrook								
1970	Knox		Knox	Barker; Trinity								
1971	Knox		Knox	Waverley								
1972	Knox		Knox	Barker; Cranbrook; Knox; St Aloysius'								
1973	Knox		Waverley	Cranbrook								
1974	Waverley		Cranbrook	Waverley								
1975	Waverley		Knox	Trinity								
1976	Waverley		Knox; Cranbrook	Knox								
1977	Waverley		Knox	Barker								
1978	Waverley		Knox	St Aloysius'	Knox							
1979	Waverley		Knox	Waverley	Knox							
1980	Waverley		Knox	Barker; Trinity; Waverley	Knox Barker							
1981	Waverley		Knox	Waverley	Barker							
1982	Waverley		Knox	Cranbrook	Barker							
1983	Knox		Knox	Waverley	Barker							
1984	Knox		Knox	Cranbrook	Barker							
1985	Knox		Knox	Cranbrook	Barker							
1986	Barker		Knox	Trinity	Barker							
1987	Barker		Knox	Waverley	Barker							
1988	Barker	Trinity	Waverley	Barker	Trinity							
1989	Barker	Cranbrook	Waverley	Barker	Barker							
1990	Barker	St Aloysius'	Waverley	Trinity	Trinity	Barker						
1991	Barker	Knox	Waverley	Barker; Knox	Trinity	Trinity	St Aloysius'					
1992	Knox	Barker	Knox	Barker; Waverley	Waverley	Barker	St Aloysius'					
1993	Waverley	Knox	Waverley	Barker	Barker	Barker; Knox	St Aloysius'	Knox				
1994	Waverley	Barker	Waverley	Cranbrook	Waverley	Barker	St Aloysius'	Knox				
1995	Waverley	Trinity	Waverley	Knox	Waverley	Barker	Cranbrook	Trinity				
1996	Barker	Knox	Waverley	Waverley	Barker	Barker; Waverley	St Aloysius'	Trinity				
1997	Barker	Waverley	Waverley	Waverley	Barker; Knox	Barker	St Aloysius'	Trinity				
1998	Barker	Cranbrook	Waverley	Barker	Waverley	Barker; Waverley	Knox	Knox				
1999	Barker	Trinity	Waverley	Knox	St Aloysius'; Barker	Knox; Trinity	Cranbrook; St Aloysius'; Trinity	Barker				
2000	Barker	Barker	Waverley	Knox; Trinity; Waverley	Barker	Barker; Knox	Knox	Barker				
2001	Knox	Barker	Waverley	Knox	Barker	Trinity	Cranbrook; St Aloysius'; Trinity	Barker			Cranbrook	Trinity
2002	Barker	Barker	Waverley	Waverley	Trinity	Trinity	Barker	Barker	Knox		Trinity	Trinity Knox
2003	Knox	Waverley	Knox	Knox	Trinity	Waverley	Barker	Barker	Barker		Trinity	Trinity
2004	Knox	Knox	Trinity	Barker	Trinity	Barker	Trinity	Barker	Barker		Trinity	Trinity St Aloysius'
2005	Barker	Knox	Trinity	Barker	Barker	Knox	Barker	Barker	Barker		Knox	Trinity
2006	Knox	Trinity	Trinity	Barker	Waverley	Knox	St Aloysius'	Knox	Knox		Knox	Trinity
2007	Knox	Barker	Trinity	Waverley	Barker; Cranbrook	Trinity	Knox	St Aloysius'	Knox		Trinity	Trinity
2008	Knox	Knox	Trinity	Knox	Barker	Waverley	St Aloysius'	Barker	Barker		Knox	Trinity Barker
2009	Trinity	Knox	Trinity	Knox; Waverley	Knox; Trinity	Waverley	St Aloysius'	Cranbrook		Waverley	Knox	Trinity Knox
2010	Trinity	Knox	Trinity	Barker	Trinity	Trinity	St Aloysius'	Cranbrook	Waverley	Knox; St Aloysius'	Knox	Trinity St Aloysius'
2011	Trinity	Knox	Trinity	Trinity	Trinity	Barker	Barker; St Aloysius'	Cranbrook	Knox	Barker	Trinity	Trinity St Aloysius'
2012	Barker	Barker	Trinity	Barker	Trinity	St Aloysius'	Knox	Cranbrook	Knox	Trinity	Trinity	Trinity
2013	Barker	Barker	Trinity	Barker	Trinity	St Aloysius'	Barker	Cranbrook; Barker	Barker	Cranbrook	Trinity	Trinity
2014	Barker	Trinity	Trinity	Cranbrook	Knox	Knox	Barker	Trinity	Trinity	Knox	Trinity	Trinity Barker
2015	Barker	Waverley	Trinity	Knox	Barker	Trinity	Barker	Barker		Waverley	Trinity	Trinity
2016	Trinity	Knox	Trinity	Knox; Waverley	Trinity	Knox	St Aloysius'; Barker	Cranbrook			Trinity	Trinity
2017	Trinity	Trinity	Knox	Waverley	Trinity	St Aloysius'; Waverley	Barker	Cranbrook	Trinity	Trinity	Trinity	Trinity
2018	Trinity	Trinity	Knox	Barker	Barker	Barker	Barker; Cranbrook	Trinity	Knox	Waverley	Trinity	Trinity
2019	Trinity	Barker	Knox	Barker	Knox	Barker	Barker	Trinity	Knox	Trinity	Knox	Trinity
2020	Cancelled due to Covid	Cranbrook	Knox	Waverley	Knox	Knox	Barker Knox	Trinity	Cancelled due to Covid	Cancelled due to Covid	Knox	Trinity
2021	Cancelled due to Covid	Cranbrook	Knox	Cancelled due to Covid	Trinity Knox	Cancelled due to Covid	Knox	Cancelled due to Covid	Barker	Cancelled due to Covid	Knox	
2022		Cranbrook Barker	Knox	Barker	Knox St Aloysius'	Knox		Cranbrook	St Aloysius'	Waverley	Knox	Trinity
2023				Waverley		Waverley						
2024				Barker		Knox						
2025				Barker		Trinity						
2026				Barker								

== Trophies awarded ==
=== Rugby ===
The Henry Plume Shield, named after the founder of Barker, is awarded to the winners of the 1st XV competition.

=== Cricket ===
The Archer Shield, named after one of Knox's founders and benefactors, Andrew Reid.

=== Swimming ===
The Thyne Challenge Shield is awarded to the winner of the CAS Swimming Championships. "Thyne" was the maiden name of the wife of Andrew Reid, after whom the athletics trophy is named.

=== Basketball ===
The Associated Schools of NSW Basketball Shield is awarded to the winner of the 1st V basketball competition.

=== Football (soccer) ===
The Thomas Grimson OAM Cup is awarded to the winner of the 1st XI soccer competition. It is named after Thomas Grismon, a life member of the Australian and NSW Soccer Federation.

=== Tennis ===
The CAS Tennis Trophy is awarded to the winner of the 1st IV summer tennis competition. The CAS Winter Trophy is awarded to the winner of the 1st IV winter tennis competition.

=== Drill ===
The CAS Drill Trophy is awarded to the winner of the CAS Cadet Drill Competition. The competition was started in 2002 and includes the Cadet Units from all the schools except Cranbrook. St Aloysius competed for the first time in 2018.

=== Debating ===
The CAS Debating Cup was first awarded in 1991.

=== Cross country ===
The winner of the Opens team event at the CAS Cross Country Championships is awarded The Neil Logan CAS Cross Country Shield. It was first awarded in 1993.

== See also ==
- List of schools in New South Wales
