= Barker College =

Location
- Hornsby, Sydney; Australia; 33°42′40″S 151°6′1″E

Information
- Type: Independent co-educational early learning, primary and secondary day and boarding school
- Motto: Latin: Honor Non Honores (Seek Honour above Rewards)
- Denomination: Anglican
- Established: 1890; 136 years ago
- Founder: Henry Plume
- Educational authority: New South Wales Education Standards Authority
- Headmaster: Phillip Heath
- Chaplain: Pete Tong
- Employees: 537
- Years: Early learning and Kindergarten to Year 12
- Gender: Co-Ed
- Enrolment: 2,800 (2025-2026)
- Area: 16.9 hectares (42 acres)
- Campus type: Suburban
- Colours: Red, navy and gold
- Slogan: Inspiring Tomorrow
- Rival: Knox Grammar School
- Affiliations: Combined Associated Schools; Headmasters' and Headmistresses' Conference; Association of Heads of Independent Schools of Australia; Junior School Heads Association of Australia; Australian Boarding Schools' Association; Independent Schools Association; Round Square Conference
- Alumni: Old Barkers
- Website: www.barker.college

Barker College is an independent Anglican co-educational early learning, primary and secondary day and boarding school, located in Hornsby, a North Shore suburb of Sydney, New South Wales, Australia. Barker was founded in 1890 by Rev. Henry Plume at Kurrajong Heights. In 2016 Barker announced a transition to a fully co-educational school, commencing in 2018 with girls in early learning and Kindergarten, in 2019 with girls in Year 3; in 2020 with girls in Year 7. It includes boarding facilities (Co-ed) for students from Years 9 to 12.

The school also incorporates three campuses for Aboriginal children: two in NSW and the third, Dhupuma Barker, in North East Arnhem Land in 2021.

The Council of Barker College was originally constituted by the Barker College Ordinance of 1919. In 1939, Barker College was incorporated pursuant to the provisions of the Anglican Church of Australia (Bodies Corporate) Act 1938. Therefore, though Barker College is an Anglican school, it is separately incorporated and has its own governing body.

Barker is affiliated with the Headmasters' and Headmistresses' Conference, the Association of Heads of Independent Schools of Australia, the Junior School Heads Association of Australia, the Australian Boarding Schools' Association, the Independent Schools Association, and is a founding member of the Combined Associated Schools.

== History ==
In 1890, Henry Plume took up the position of Rector at St Stephen's Church, Kurrajong. It was at the church that he tutored five local pupils for the Junior, Senior and Matriculation Examinations. Their academic success encouraged Plume to establish his own school. In 1891, Plume selected Stokesleigh, a guest house in Kurrajong Heights, as the site for this school. The name Barker College was chosen in memory of Frederic Barker, the second Bishop of Sydney whom Plume had met soon after his arrival in Australia. An outbreak of scarlet fever in 1894 convinced Plume that the School was too isolated and would be better located nearer to Sydney. Thus the School moved to its present site in Hornsby in 1896, and in 1919 its ownership transferred to the Church of England. In 1971, the first Student Council commenced.

=== Co-education ===
1975 saw the introduction of the co-educational collegiate senior school for students in Years 11 and 12, with the enrolment of 59 female students. In 2000, with Year 10 becoming became part of the senior school, girls started at Year 10 level.

== Headmasters ==
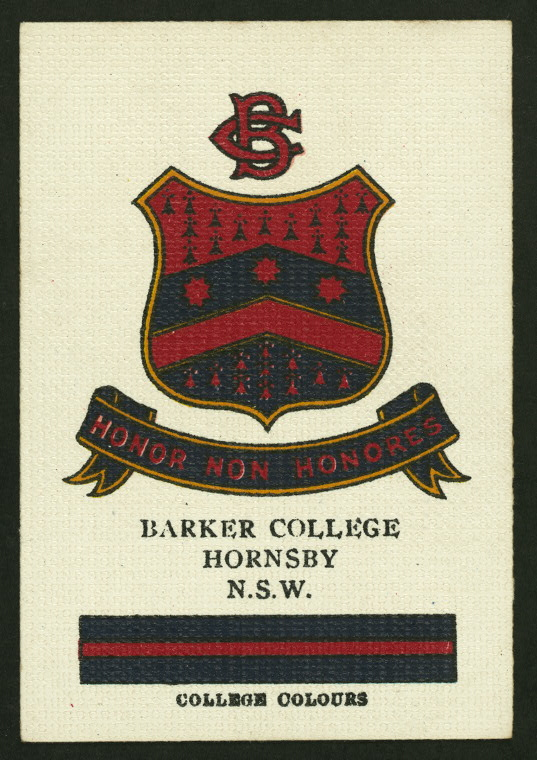
Cigarette card featuring the Barker colours and crest, c. 1910s

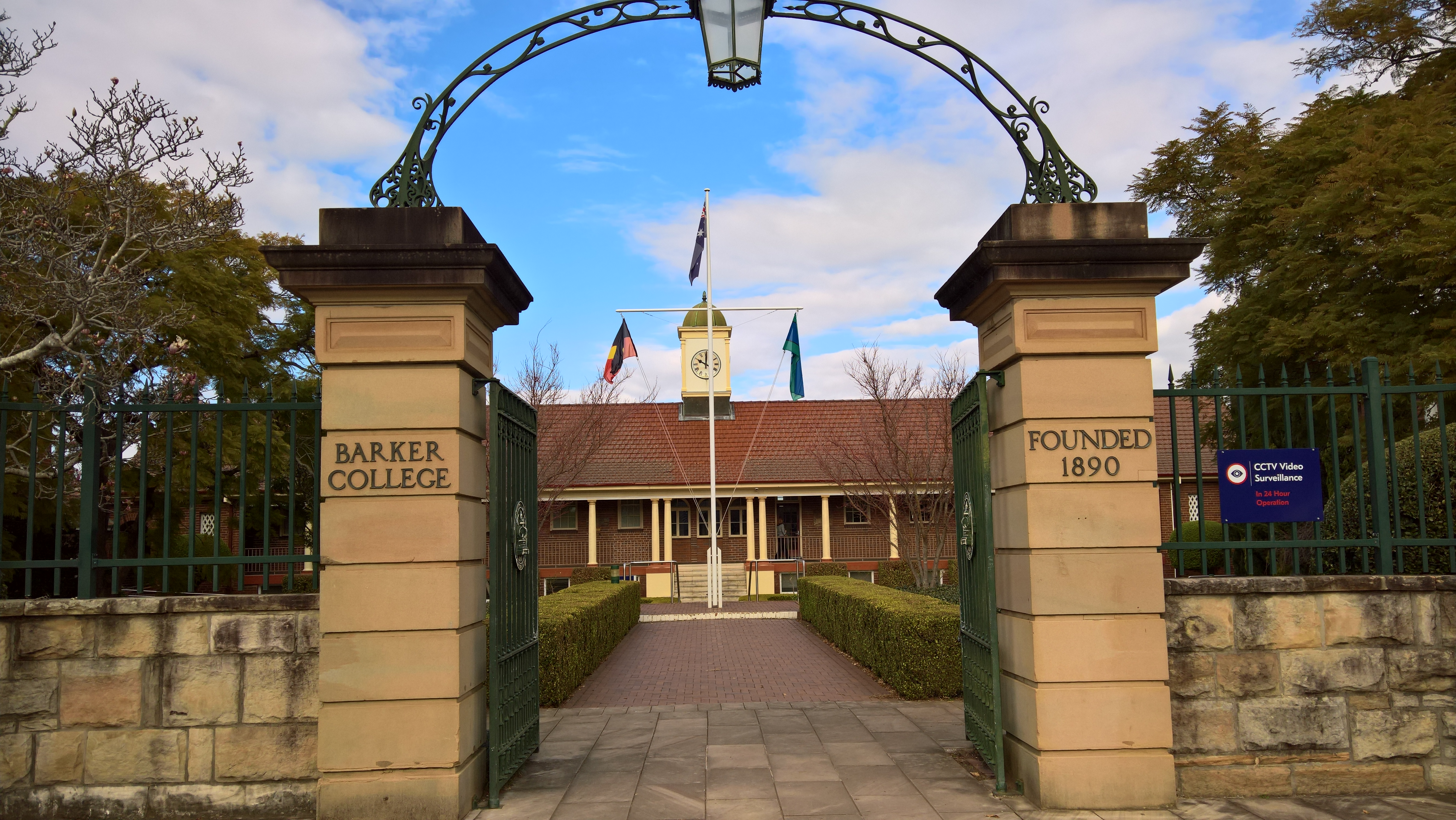
Barker College "Mint" entrance gates, Pacific Highway, Hornsby, New South Wales

The following men have served as Headmasters of Barker College:

Ordinal	Officeholder	Term start	Term end	Time in office	Refs.
1	Henry Plume	1890	1905	14–15 years	
2	William Charles Carter	1905	1929	23–24 years	
3	Arthur Charles Campbell Thorold	1929	1932	2–3 years	
4	William Stanley Leslie	1933	1957	23–24 years	
5	John Gordon Dewes	1958	1963	4–5 years	
6	Trevor John McCaskill	1963	1986	22–23 years	
7	Neil William Tucker	1986	1995	8–9 years	
8	Dr. Roderick Edward Kefford	1996	2013	16–17 years	
9	Phillip James Heath, AM	2014	present		

== Motto ==
The school motto, Honor non Honores, is derived from the Latin meaning "Honour not Rewards". The earliest record of the motto is on an illuminated address presented to Rev and Mrs Plume on their departure from the School in 1905.

== Campus ==
Barker College is situated on a 44-hectare (110-acre) campus in suburban Hornsby, 25 kilometres (16 mi) to the north of Sydney, with additional facilities located in the Blue Mountains, and The Grange, located at Mount Victoria. The Junior School, shares the Hornsby campus with the Middle and Senior schools.

In 2016 the school opened an Indigenous campus, Darkinjung Barker, at Yarramalong on the NSW Central Coast, for students in Kindergarten to Year 6. In 2020 the school opened a second K–6 Indigenous campus, in the old Wollombi Public School building, called Ngarralingayil Barker; Ngarralingayil means "a place where learning happens" in the Wonnarua language. Fifteen students were enrolled in 2020, and 22 are expected in 2021.

The current facilities of the school include:

- A library; an information technology centre; the McCaskill Music Centre;
- Three drama performance spaces: two theatres with raked seating – The Rhodes Theatre and The BCMA Theatre – and the Leslie Hall;
- The Centenary Design Centre with provision for individual studios and whole-class teaching in design and technology and visual arts;
- The Barker Foundation Science Centre;
- Boarding houses;
- Six sporting fields, together with 11 tennis courts, indoor courts for netball, basketball and volleyball, an artificial surface for hockey, football, softball and other games;
- The R. E. Kefford Building, equipped with classrooms, smaller group learning spaces, and two theatres which seat 302 and 215 respectively.
- The Junior School is an International Baccalaureate Candidate School and aims to become a registered IB school.
- The purpose-built Kurrajong Building for Pre-K – Year 2 students opened in 2018 within the Junior School campus.
- The Rosewood Centre for indoor sports, containing a number of classrooms
- Alyssa Healy Fields for outdoor sports split into 1 & 2 outside of Rosewood Center
- The Senior Study Hub (The Maths Hub), equipped with classrooms and facilities for senior students

== Barker College House System ==
As with most Australian schools, Barker College utilises a house system for students in years K-12. Each house has a teacher in charge, called a Head of House. The Junior School has 6 six Houses that were named after explorers of Australia and Antarctica: Byrd, Flinders, Hillary, Mawson, Scott & Tasman. The Middle and Senior School has 16 sixteen houses, named after influential people in the School's history, such as alumni or School Council members.

=== Middle and Senior School Houses ===
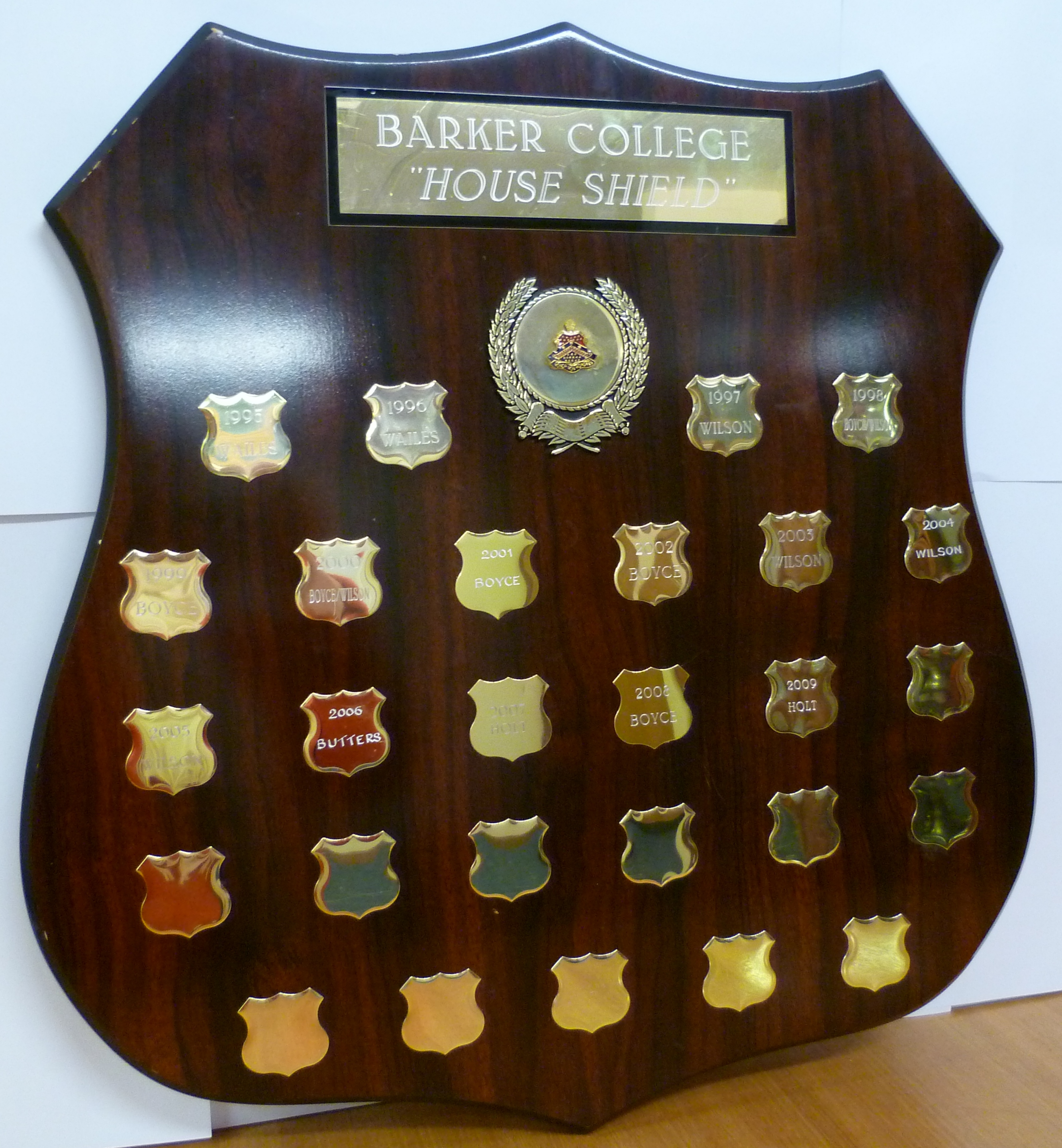
House Shield No. 2 Barker College Middle School

The Middle and Senior School Houses are named after influential figures in the School's history, with eight male and eight female namesakes. In July 2018 the College announced they would be changing the pastoral care system for the middle and senior school following the introduction of coeducation. The existing Houses are all named after influential men from the school's history, and after the introduction of coeducation, another eight new Houses were announced, after important women in the School's past. These new houses are Bowman, Fear (1980), Hill, Mackenzie, May, Stevens, Sthalekar and Stone, adding to the list of existing houses; Andrew, Boyce, Butters, Holt, Pain, Wade, Wailes and Wilson. Both male and female students will be allocated to one of the 16 houses, regardless of gender.

== Robotics ==
Notable achievements include:

FIRST Robotics Competition: Inducted into the Hall of Fame (2021), Winner of World Championship division "Daly" (2025)

VEX Robotics: VEX IQ Middle School National Champions (2025). VEX V5 Middle School National Champions (2025)

== Sport ==
Barker College is a member of the Combined Associated Schools (CAS).

=== CAS premierships ===
Barker College has won the following CAS premierships.

- Athletics (19) – 1946, 1948, 1986, 1987, 1988, 1989, 1990, 1991, 1996, 1997, 1998, 1999, 2000, 2002, 2005, 2012, 2013, 2014, 2015
- Basketball (21) – 1980, 1981, 1982, 1983, 1984, 1985, 1986, 1987, 1989, 1993, 1996, 1997, 1999, 2000, 2001, 2005, 2007, 2008, 2015, 2018, 2026
- Cricket (13) – 1930, 1932, 1934, 1939, 1992, 1994, 2000, 2001, 2002, 2007, 2013, 2019, 2022
- Cross Country (10) – 1999, 2000, 2001, 2002, 2003, 2004, 2005, 2008, 2013, 2015
- Diving (2) – 2019, 2021
- Rugby (21) – 1949, 1970, 1972, 1977, 1980, 1988, 1989, 1991, 1992, 1993, 1998, 2004, 2005, 2006, 2010, 2012, 2013, 2018, 2019, 2022, 2024
- Soccer (14) – 1990, 1992, 1993, 1994, 1995, 1996, 1997, 1998, 2000, 2004, 2011, 2013, 2018, 2019
- Swimming (2) – 1940, 1946
- Tennis Summer (3) – 2002, 2004, 2021
- Volleyball Summer (2) – 2008, 2014

=== Basketball Team Achievements ===
==== Championship Women (Open) ====
- Australian Schools Championships

(bronze) Third Place: 2024
(silver) Second Place: 2025

== See also ==
- List of non-government schools in New South Wales
- List of boarding schools in Australia
- List of Anglican schools in New South Wales
- Lawrence Campbell Oratory Competition
