= Independent Primary School Heads of Australia =

Incorporated body of primary schools in Australia

The Independent Primary School Heads of Australia
- Formation: September 1952
- Members: 380 member schools
- Executive Officer: Paul Clegg
- National President: Martin Lubrano
- National Secretary: Rebecca Lennon
- Website: www.ipsha.org.au

The Independent Primary School Heads of Australia (IPSHA) formerly Junior School Heads Association of Australia (JSHAA), is an incorporated body representing the heads of independent primary schools in Australia. Officially established in September 1952, the Association is broken into state branches, with six offices across Australia. The organisation currently has a membership of nearly 380 Full Members, 60 Associate and Life Members and 23 Overseas Members. Combined, the member schools employ around 6,000 people, and are responsible for educating about 100,000 primary aged children.

== History ==
The IPSHA evolved largely from informal gatherings of New South Wales headmasters, which called itself the Junior Schools' Conference. The Organisation was established in 1952, when a conference was held at Cranbrook School, Sydney, where a constitution was agreed upon for the establishment of the Junior Schools' Conference of Australia.

The organisation holds biennial conferences, which alternate between states. At the biennial Conference in Perth in 1984, the Constitution was amended and the Heads of Independent Girls' Schools became eligible for membership of the IPSHA. Along with this change, came eligibility for heads of co-educational junior schools to join, which provided a significant boost in membership.

== Key relationships ==
=== National ===
- Australian Primary Principals Association (APPA). IPSHA has state and federal representatives on both the APPA Secretariat and National Executive Council. The IPSHA Federal President is a member of both these bodies.
- Principals Australia Institute (PAI). The IPSHA President-Elect is a member.
- Association of Heads of Independent Schools of Australia (AHISA). Strong communication and liaison exists when addressing matters of mutual concern and benefit to our schools.
- Independent Schools Council of Australia (ISCA)
- Associations of Independent Schools (AIS) in each state

=== International ===
- International Confederation of Principals (ICP) – a global voice for school leaders. IPSHA is a member.
- The Association of Heads of the Independent Schools of New Zealand (AHISNZ)
- The Independent Association of Preparatory Schools (IAPS) in the United Kingdom
- The Elementary School Heads Association (ESHA) in the United States of America

== National Board & State Branches ==
The IPSHA Board has regular termly meetings that looks at the strategic, decision making, reporting and operational matters. The Board consists of an Executive Officer, National Board Members and State Directors. is made up of has branches in each of Australia's six states, New South Wales, Queensland, South Australia, Tasmania, Victoria and Western Australia. Each state has an elected representative.

=== IPSHA National Board Members ===
- Paul Clegg (EO)
- National President – Martin Lubrano (Barker College - NSW)
- National Secretary – Rebecca Lennon (Moreton Bay College - QLD)
- National Treasurer – Chris Wyatt (Trinity Grammar School - Strathfield - NSW)
- Immediate Past-President – Wayne Revitt (Penrhos College - WA)

The State Directors listed below also are members of the IPSHA Board of Directors:

=== State Directors ===
- New South Wales – Sue Floro (Knox Grammar School)
- Queensland – Carolyn Thistlewaite (Coomera Anglican College)
- South Australia – Simon McKenzie (Westminster School)
- Tasmania – Mark Febey (The Frends School)
- Victoria – Rowan van-Ray (St. Pauls Anglican Grammar)
- Western Australia – Anthony Moses (South Coast Baptist College)

== New South Wales ==
With over 120 members from city, suburban and regional primary and middle schools, the New South Wales Branch of IPSHA has a wide diversity of schools represented. Member schools range from stand alone primary schools to K–12 campuses in both single sex and coeducational settings. All are independent and many reflect a variety of faith based and philosophical missions.

Its term meetings are held at a variety of schools and include relevant professional development through keynote speakers, discussion groups and workshops.

Students in member schools have access to a range of events. Performing Arts Festivals, Debating, Social Issues Expos, Travelling Art Exhibitions, and a wide range of Saturday Sport activities.

== Queensland ==
The Queensland branch of the IPSHA now has 80 members from independent schools across the state including single-sex, coeducational, denominational, nondenominational, metropolitan and regional schools.

Members meet once per term at one of the member schools, for the purpose of Professional Development, a Branch Meeting and opportunities for networking. Over the last few years, annual State Branch Refresher weekends have been held, with the majority of them in North Queensland.

== South Australia ==
The South Australian Branch comprises a range of schools in diverse settings in both metropolitan and rural areas. The SA Branch Executive is charged with ensuring the operations of the Branch are maintained throughout each year. One Branch meeting a term is scheduled, and these are usually held at a school.

== Tasmania ==
Twelve members representing schools from both the north and south of the State make up the current membership. This includes both Primary and Middle School Heads and all are part of K-12 schools. Both coeducational and single sex schools are represented.

The Tasmanian Branch of IPSHA meets each term, alternating between Hobart and Launceston. Meetings include a professional learning topic or issue, together with an opportunity for sharing learning and leadership practices and for general collegiality

== Victoria ==
The Victorian Branch of IPSHA consists of over one hundred members from Independent schools across Victoria, including single sex, co-educational, denominational, non-denominational, metropolitan and rural schools. Many of its members' Schools are part of a K-12 structure, while some are stand alone Primary Schools.

The main goal of the branch is to maintain the Independent Primary School Heads of Australia as a significant influence in primary education, by fostering the cause of primary education and maintaining links with other associations and official bodies involved in primary education. Providing collegial support for its colleagues and the staff at its schools, is also a priority. By coming to its four Branch meetings annually and attending IPSHA events, members can take advantage of opportunities to network, develop leadership and recognise members' contributions to the wider educational community. The culture of the Victorian Branch of IPSHA is one of professionalism, learning, sharing, mutual support and friendship.

== Western Australia ==
The Western Australian Branch of the IPSHA was formed in 1954 (as the WA Branch of the JSHAA), by Jeffrey G Hart, of Guildford Grammar School. The first formal gathering of Junior School Heads for the purpose of forming an Association was at Guildford Grammar School in 1954. The first formal meeting of the West Australian Branch was held at Christ Church Grammar School in May 1968, at the meeting a sub-committee was appointed for the purpose of drawing up a proposed constitution. The founding members of the organisation were:

- Aquinas College
- Christ Church Grammar
- Guildford Grammar
- Hale School
- Scotch College
- Trinity College
- Wesley College

The Constitution was adopted on 5 July 1968, at the second meeting at Hale School in Perth. Currently, the WA branch features 54 member schools, most of which are located in the Perth Metropolitan area.

=== Western Australia activities ===
Ecumenical service

Students gather in a rotated school hall annually (usually in May), where schools may send a set number of students from middle to upper primary. It was previously held in St. Georges Cathedral, Perth.

Festival of performing arts

Every second year school groups are invited to perform in front of the IPSHA in the Perth Concert Hall. The concert runs for three evenings and one day (the day being especially for children).

Art and craft festival

One member school hosts an Art and Craft Festival on alternate years to the Performing Arts concert. Art may come from a range of year levels.

Chess day

Every year a chess day is held at a member school. IPSHA schools are invited to send a team of four to compete. This event alternates between two set member schools.

== See also ==
- Lists of schools in Australia
