= St Gregory's College, Campbelltown =

St Gregory's College

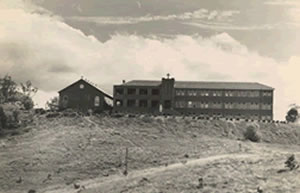
- Main building and original chapel, c. 1942

Location
- 100 Badgally Road, Gregory Hills, New South Wales; Australia; 34°2′23″S 150°47′20″E

Information
- Former name: St Gregory's Agricultural College
- Type: Independent comprehensive and specialist primary and secondary day and boarding school
- Motto: Latin: Quae Seminaveris Metes (What you sow, so shall you reap)
- Religious affiliations: Marist Brothers; Association of Marist Schools of Australia
- Denomination: Roman Catholicism
- Established: 1926; 100 years ago
- Founders: Marist Brothers; Thomas Donovan
- Educational authority: New South Wales Education Standards Authority
- Oversight: Diocese of Wollongong
- Specialist: Agricultural school
- Headmaster: Matthew Brennan
- Chaplain: John Roberts, OFM
- Staff: 157 (FTE)
- Years: K–12
- Gender: Boys only: 7–12; Co-educational: K–6
- Enrolment: 1,100 (2007)
- Campus: 3 hectares (7.4 acres)
- Colours: Maroon and sky blue
- Nickname: Greg's, St. Greg's, SGC
- Affiliations: Australian Boarding Schools' Association; Independent Schools Association; Association of Heads of Independent Schools of Australia
- Website: www.stgregs.nsw.edu.au

St Gregory's College Campbelltown (abbreviated as SGC or Greg's or St Greg's) is an independent Catholic single-sex and co-educational comprehensive and specialist primary and secondary day and boarding school, located in Gregory Hills, near Campbelltown, a south-western suburb of Sydney, New South Wales, Australia. With specialist expertise as an agricultural school, St Gregory's College provides a co-educational environment for students in the Kindergarten to Year 6 primary school; and a boys-only environment for students in the Year 7 to Year 12 secondary schools.

Founded on 3 February 1926 and conducted by the Marist Brothers since 1929, St Gregory's has a non-selective enrolment policy and currently caters for approximately 1,100 students, including 180 boarders.

The college is located within the Diocese of Wollongong, and is a member of the Association of Heads of Independent Schools of Australia (AHISA), the Australian Boarding Schools' Association, the Association of Marist Schools of Australia, and is an associate member of the Independent Schools Association (ISA). It is conducted by the Marist Brothers.

== History ==
=== Early days ===
St Gregory's College commenced operations in 1926. The property on which the college is located was owned by Thomas Donovan. In the early 1920s he contacted the Marist Brothers about starting a school for boys to help them learn the skills to have careers.

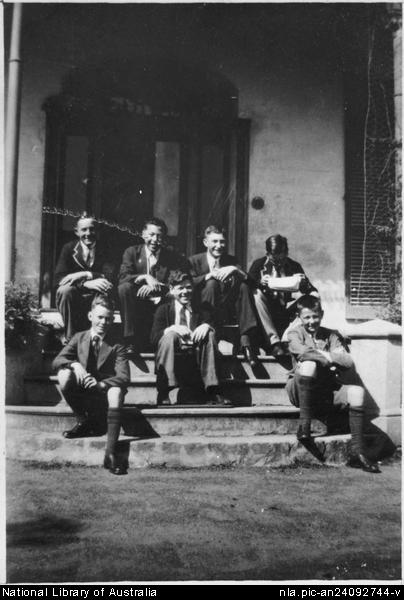
St Greg's Intermediate class, circa 1932

St Gregory's commenced operations as a boarding school on 3 February 1926 with five Marist Brothers as staff, and two students (The Cuskelly Brothers). By the end of the year the student numbers had risen to ten.

In 1929 the estate was handed over to the Marist Brothers by Thomas Donovan. Donovan intended that St Gregory's College should exist for country boys whom he would endow with bursaries. Much of the early infrastructure was also donated by Mr Donovan, for example the Chapel, classrooms and the first dormitory.

The foundation principal in 1926 was Br Felix. However, before the end of the first year he was recalled to his position at St. Joseph's College, Hunters Hill. Br Laurentius who was on the staff took over the position. Br Laurentius was only 27 years old but suffered from ill health. Enrolments climbed to around 50 students despite the college not having main electricity or a reliable supply of water.

The Great Depression saw enrolments drop to ten students and the college was threatened with closure. Principal Br Laurentius died in 1933 after a long illness. Br Antoninus was appointed the new principal and led the college during the Depression years.

=== Recent history ===
The college has hosted the Marist cricket and basketball Carnival's, Won the Arrive Alive and Nutri-Grain Cup. In 2008 St Gregory's had a mass in celebration of the "Journey of the World Youth Day Cross and Icon" just months before World Youth Day in which the college was very involved.

In 2018, the College became a K–12 school, with the opening of the Junior School on the College grounds. The Junior and Senior schools are administered separately, under the direction of the Headmaster and the Trustees. The Junior School is co-educational, and the Senior School is a single-sex school for boys only. Girls must seek an alternate secondary school at which to complete their senior education.

=== Sexual abuse allegations ===
In June, July and August 2014 the Royal Commission into Institutional Responses to Child Sexual Abuse initiated in 2013 by the Australian Government and supported by all of its state governments, began an investigation into the response of Marist Brothers to allegations of child sexual abuse in schools in the ACT, NSW and Queensland. Five former students, one former teacher, a former assistant principal and two former principals, former and current Marist officials and clergy, and one of the clergy at the centre of the allegations gave evidence or made statements before the Royal Commission that the alleged cases of abuse happened during the 1970s, and 1980s at Daramalan College, Canberra, at Lismore, Campbelltown and in Far North Queensland.

In March 2015 a former Marist brother was arrested over a number of sex offences allegedly committed at St Joseph's College and St Gregory's College in the 1980s.

== Campus ==
The college is situated on a single three-hectare (seven-acre) campus. Previously, the land owned by the College once exceeded 405 hectares (1,000 acres) before most of it was sold to create the Gregory Hills housing sub-division, located in the suburb of Gregory Hills (a suburb located within Camden Council) and approximately 43 kilometres (27 mi) from the Sydney central business district. St Gregory's is located on Badgally Hill, the second highest peak between Sydney and the Great Dividing Range.

=== Boarding ===
Boarders of St Gregory's College live in houses named after a significant Brother in the college's history.

== List of Headmasters ==
The following individuals have served as Headmaster of St Gregory's College, Campbelltown:

Ordinal	Officeholder	Term start	Term end	Time in office	Notes
1	Br. Felix	1926	1926	0 years	
2	Br. Laurentius	1926	1933	6–7 years	
3	Br. Antoninus	1933	1937	3–4 years	
4	Br. William Molloy	1937			
5	Br. Ambrose Brady				
6	Br. Valens Boyle				
7	Br. Angelus McKinnley				
8	Br. Coman Sykes	1957			
9	Br. Anslem Saundersx	c. 1960			
10	Br. Charles Howard (formerly Brother Elias)				
11	Br. Frederick McMahon				
12	Br. Clarence Cunningham				
13	Br. Ernest Houston				
14	Br. Geoffrey Schwager				
15	Br. William Connell				
16	Br. Paul Hough	c. 1990	2000	9–10 years	
17	Marshall McMahon	2001	2007	6–7 years	
18	Br. Peter Pemble	2008	2008	0 years	
19	Damian Millar	2009	2018	10 years	
20	Lee MacMaster	2019	2021	3 years	
21	Paul Brooks	2021	2022	1 year	
22	Matthew Brennan	2022	incumbent		

== Co-curriculum ==
=== Sport ===
St Gregory's College has a strong reputation in sport. St Gregory's is known for its success in Water Polo, cricket and in the last millennium, soccer.

In 2008 the First XI winning the MCS competition, 2007 Australasian Marist Carnival and joint premiers in the Combined Catholic College's Downey Trophy, with 22 wins and 0 losses all season. The college has been dubbed "A Nursery for Mens Water Polo Players" and with this Water Polo is very strong culture at the college as St Gregory's compete in the MCS competition and the Arrive Alive Cup and have been champions on a record 9 occasions and Runners Up twice. Strong support from the college community is present at semi-finals and finals in the MCS competition and all Arrive Alive Cup matches. St Gregory's won the 2010 MCS Water Polo Grand Final defeating Patrician Brother's Blacktown in the final 24–10 coached by Lee Addison. They also retained their title in 2011, thus becoming the first team from the college since 1994 to achieve back to back titles. Rugby Union is also becoming part of the sporting culture at the college with the boarding community representing the college against teams in the GPS and ISA sporting competitions. In 2008, only the second year of "serious" competitive Rugby Union fixtures, St Gregory's made the semifinals of the Waratah Shield, losing to fellow ISA school St Augustine's College held at St Joseph's College. The college has reached the final of the MCS Soccer competition 4 out of the last 5 years. The college provides facilities for the students with 8 rugby league/union fields, 3 cricket fields, 3 football (Soccer) fields, swimming pool, tennis courts, cricket nets, outdoor and indoor basketball courts and a College gymnasium.

Sports played at the college include: Rugby League, Cricket, Football (Soccer), Basketball, Rugby Union, Australian Rules Football, Touch Football, Golf, Tennis, Athletics, Cross Country, Swimming, and Softball.

St Gregory's College is known as a nursery to the National Rugby League (NRL) with some notable players representing several NRL teams along with State and National honours. On Grand Final day 2007 saw each 3 grandfinals Jersey Flegg, Premier League and the NRL Telstra Premiership had a representative from St Gregory's College. Rugby League is the dominant sport in St Gregory's College.

=== Debating and public speaking ===
Debating and public speaking has had a long history at St Gregory's College. The college represents itself in the Competition for Public Speaking and Debating. The college also participates in the regular seasons of the named curricula. The CSDA is the debating competition in which St. Gregory's College. Public Speaking is also widely encouraged at St. Gregory's with multiple competitions throughout the school year. The CSDA competition is an outside run competition in which the school selects students to attend, the Gordon Fetterplace Public Speaking Competition which is a school run competition. Finally the Marist Oratary is entered for the best public speakers of the college.

Until 2008 the Year 12 debating trophy was named for Douglas Berneville-Claye a former teacher who was a convicted criminal and British traitor.

=== Agriculture ===
Once based on 526 hectares (1,300 acres) and, until 1990, called "St Gregory's Agricultural College" it was home to a commercial dairy, cattle, poultry, piggery and popular rodeo timed to coincide with the Fisher's Ghost Festival. The school began a land cost analysis in the late 1980s, assigning senior Agricultural students the task of identifying value as their major project for the HSC. The school appears to have stepped back from this history and little publicly available evidence remains outside of hardcopy yearbooks.

The college still competes in various aspects of agriculture. As well as running agriculture classes and its reduced College farm, the college participates in show cattle and show sheep competitions and programs. Most recently the college participated at the annual Sydney Royal Easter Show, Camden Show and Dubbo Show.

== Notable alumni ==
Alumni of St Gregory's College are commonly referred to as 'Old Boys' and may choose to join the schools alumni association, the St Gregory's College Old Boys Association.

=== Entertainment, media and the arts ===
- Kerry Casey – actor
- Nathan Cavaleri – musician
- Geoff Jansz – Sri Lankan-Australian chef and television presenter
- Peter Lloyd – Australian Broadcasting Corporation journalist
- Harvey Shore – TV producer and author

=== Politics, public service and the law ===
- Peter Breen – former independent Member of the NSW Legislative Council
- General Angus Campbell, AO DSC – Chief of the Australian Defence Force, previously Chief of the Australian Army and Commander of Operation Sovereign Borders
- Steven Chaytor – former Australian Labor Party member of the New South Wales Legislative Assembly, representing Macquarie Fields
- Benedict Paul Hardman – Member of the Victorian Legislative Assembly, representing Seymour
- Adrian Piccoli – current Director of the Gonski Institute for Education at the University of New South Wales, former National Party member of the New South Wales Legislative Assembly for Murrumbidgee; and former NSW Minister for Education; also attended Catholic High School Griffith
- Thomas Gregory Stephens OAM – Labor member of the Western Australian Legislative Assembly, representing Central Kimberley-Pilbara
- Dr Vergil Narokobi – Justice of the Supreme Court of Papua New Guinea
- William John Tilley – Liberal member of the Victorian Legislative Assembly, representing Benambra; also attended Waverley College & Redden College)
- Sir Paul Tovua KCMG – Solomon Islander politician, former Speaker of the National Parliament of the Solomon Islands and co-chair of the peace talks which ended the Solomon Islands Civil War
- Graham West – former Australian Labor Party member of the New South Wales Legislative Assembly, representing Campbelltown and former cabinet minister
- Andrew Wilkie MP – current independent member of the Australian House of Representatives for the Tasmanian Division of Clark (formerly Denison)
- Jelta Wong MP – current United Resources Party member of the National Parliament of Papua New Guinea representing the Gazelle District and current cabinet Minister for Health & HIV/AIDS

=== Sport ===
- Dylan Addison – AFL player for the Western Bulldogs
- Russell Wyer - uugby league player for Western Suburbs Magpies, Parramatta Eels, Newcastle Knights.
- Trent Barrett – rugby league coach. Former player for Cronulla Sharks, Illawarra Steelers, St George Illawarra Dragons, Wigan, New South Wales and Australia
- Daniel Christian – cricketer for South Australian Redbacks, Deccan Chargers, Hampshire, Australia in T20 and formerly NSW Blues
- Peter Cusak – rugby league player for South Sydney
- Sandor Earl – rugby league player for Penrith Panthers and a model
- Adam Elliott – rugby league player for the Canterbury-Bankstown Bulldogs
- Jack Gibson – rugby league coach
- Matt Groat – rugby league player for Wests Tigers
- Eric Grothe Jr – rugby league player for Parramatta Eels
- Daniel Heckenberg – rugby league player for Harlequins RL
- Ivan Henjak – former head coach of the Brisbane Broncos and rugby league player for the Country New South Wales rugby league team, St George Illawarra Dragons, Canberra Raiders and Western Suburbs Magpies.
- Ryan Hoffman – rugby league player for the Melbourne Storm, New Zealand Warriors, NSW and Australia
- David Howell – rugby league footballer for the Canberra Raiders and Harlequins RL
- Luke Kelly – rugby league player for the Melbourne Storm
- Chris Lawrence – rugby league player for the Wests Tigers
- Alex McKinnon – rugby league player for the Newcastle Knights
- Jake Mullaney – rugby league player for formerly for the Parramatta Eels; currently playing for the Super League club the Bradford Bulls
- Robbie Mears – rugby league player
- Brendan Oake – former rugby league player for the Parramatta Eels
- Michael Potter – former rugby league coach and rugby league player for the Canterbury-Bankstown Bulldogs, St George Illawarra Dragons and New South Wales.
- Luke Quigley – rugby league player formerly for the Newcastle Knights; currently playing for the French Super League club Catalans Dragons
- Paul Quinn – rugby league player who represented Australia on the Kangaroo tour of 1963-4
- Russell Richardson – former rugby league player who represented Australia in the Super League Test series against Great Britain and in the 1999 Tri-Nations series against New Zealand.
- Trent Robinson – current head coach of the Sydney Roosters and former professional player
- Beau Scott – former rugby league player who represented Australia in the 2011 ANZAC Test, the 2011 and 2014 Four Nations tournaments and New South Wales in the 2010, 2011 and 2012 State of Origin series.
- Matt Seers – former rugby league footballer for the North Sydney Bears, Wests Tigers and Wakefield Trinity Wildcats
- Tim Sheens – former NRL coach for the Wests Tigers and Australia (also attended St Dominic's College, Kingswood)
- Jimmy Smith – Fox Sports rugby league commentator and former rugby league player for the Sydney Roosters, Western Suburbs Magpies and South Sydney Rabbitohs.
- Jason Taylor – rugby league player for Wests, Norths, the Northern Eagles, and Parramatta; a former coach of South Sydney Rabbitohs
- Taulima Tautai – rugby league player for the Cronulla Sharks
- James Tedesco – rugby league player for the Wests Tigers and the Sydney Roosters
- Nic White – rugby union player for the ACT Brumbies and the Australia national rugby union team

== See also ==
- List of non-government schools in New South Wales
- Catholic education in Australia
