= Independent Schools Association =

Independent Schools Association may refer to:

- Independent Schools Association (Australia), a grouping of schools primarily based in Sydney, Australia, for the purposes of sporting competitions
- Independent Schools Association (UK), one of the oldest of the independent schools’ organisations in the UK. The association is a constituent association of the Independent Schools Council
- Independent Schools Association of Southern Africa, the largest and oldest association of independent schools in Southern Africa
