= Chevalier College =

Location
- Burradoo, Southern Highlands, New South Wales; Australia
- Coordinates: 34°30.5′S 150°24.5′E

Information
- Type: Independent co-educational secondary day school
- Motto: Latin: Fortes in Fide (Strong in Faith)
- Religious affiliation: Missionaries of the Sacred Heart
- Denomination: Roman Catholic
- Established: 1946; 79 years ago
- Educational authority: New South Wales Department of Education
- Headmaster: Greg Miller
- Chaplain: Terry Herbert
- Grades: 7–12
- Enrolment: 1,200
- Campus: 42 hectares (104 acres)
- Houses: Giles, Osborne, Riversdale, Reid, Burford (2010)
- Colours: Blue and maroon
- Affiliations: Independent Schools Association
- Website: www.chevalier.nsw.edu.au

Chevalier College is an independent Roman Catholic co-educational secondary day school, located in Burradoo, in the Southern Highlands region of New South Wales, Australia. The College is administered by the priests and brothers of the international religious institute, the Missionaries of the Sacred Heart (MSC); and is a member of the Independent Schools Association (ISA).

== Houses ==
Chevalier College traditionally had four houses, with their respective colours: Osbourne (yellow); Riversdale (red); Giles (blue); and Reid (green). In 2010, the house Burford (purple), was added. Father Burford, after whom the house was named, was the rector of the school from 1952 until 1956. He died on 16 February 1983. In 2011, the house Clancy (orange), was added. This house is named after Ken Clancy msc.

== Sporting records ==
- 1986, Senior HICES 4 × 100 m 44.86 sec by Phillip Hall, Anthony Cipolla, Chris Scott and Ashley Goodwin. Longest standing record at the college.

== Notable alumni ==
- John Fahey AC – former Premier of New South Wales, former federal Finance Minister, President of the World Anti-Doping Agency
- Peter Haertsch AM – plastic surgeon
- Peter Hartcher – political journalist
- Ian Irvine – novelist and marine scientist
- Michael MacConnell – novelist
- Allan McMahon – Australian former rugby league representative, Newcastle Knights coach
- Professor Geordie Williamson FRS, FAA – mathematician and the youngest living Fellow of the Royal Society

== Sexual abuse ==
In 2021, Father Caruana was convicted of 26 offences against 12 students at the school between 1982 and 1989. Father Caruana was a teacher, dormitory master, rugby coach and bandmaster at the school during that time. He was sentenced to 15 years in prison.

== See also ==
- List of Catholic schools in New South Wales
- Catholic education in Australia
