= Jone Tawake =

Fijian rugby union player

- Born: 17 April 1982 (age 44)
- Height: 1.87 m (6 ft 1 1/2 in)
- Weight: 118 kg (260 lb; 18.6 st)

Rugby union career
- Position: Loose forward
Senior career
Years	Team	Apps	(Points)
2011–	Toulon		
2009–11	Narbonne	20	(30)
Provincial / State sides
Years	Team	Apps	(Points)
2007–08	Canberra Vikings		
Super Rugby
Years	Team	Apps	(Points)
2004–07	Brumbies		
2002–03	Waratahs	2748	
International career
Years	Team	Apps	(Points)
- Australia U-21
–	Australia U-19		

Jone Tawake (born 17 April 1982), is a Fijian born rugby union player. He currently competes in the Top 14 for Toulon. He previously played in the Super 14 competition for the ACT Brumbies and the New South Wales Waratahs. His position of choice is flanker or number 8. He is also noted for having had a finger amputated to aid his game.

== Career ==
Tawake originally attended the Kinross Wolaroi School in Orange before joining Super 14 team, the New South Wales Waratahs. He made his debut for the Waratahs in 2002 against the Chiefs and even managed to score a try. At the conclusion of the 2003 Super 12 season, Tawake left the Waratahs after playing in ten matches over two seasons. He joined the ACT Brumbies in 2004 but was hampered by injury.

== Personal life ==
Jone Tawake immigrated to Australia at a young age from Suva, Fiji. Tawake was a volleyball schoolboy star during his earlier days before switching to Rugby Union. He goes by the nickname of 'Wacky'. He's a big fan of American-Canadian actor/comedian Jim Carrey. Tawake married Nadene Wells on 9 December 2006. During some time spent in Wangaratta (the home town of his wife) in early 2009, Jone was instrumental in getting local Volleyball team "Just Do It" from 9th (of 10 teams) to 4th, and competing with them in the Quarter Finals of the local Volleyball season.

== Finger amputation ==
In October 2006, Tawake made the tough call to have his right ring finger amputated after breaking it badly during the course of the 2006 Super 14 season. He originally had surgery to hold the finger in place after dislocating it, but the finger developed an infection and the only alternative was amputation. He made a full recovery, and had hoped to gain a place on Australia or Fiji's list for the 2007 Rugby World Cup, however this was not the case.
