= Peter Lloyd (journalist) =

Australian journalist (born 1966)

- Born: 1966
- Education: St Gregory's College, Campbelltown Charles Sturt University (BS)
- Occupations: Journalist, News producer
- Criminal information
- Status: Released
- Criminal charges: Possession of methamphetamine; Consumption of methamphetamine; Possession of drug paraphernalia stained with methamphetamine and ketamine (2 counts); Drug trafficking (dropped)
- Penalty: 10 months prison (6 months served)

Peter Lloyd (born 1966) is a journalist and was senior producer for the Australian Broadcasting Corporation's news and current affairs program Lateline. He was previously the ABC's South Asia correspondent based in New Delhi, from where he reported across all ABC national and international radio and television news and current affairs programs.

Lloyd was due to return to Australia to co-host ABC News Breakfast with Virginia Trioli on ABC2 from October 2008, but he was arrested in Singapore on drugs charges. He served six months of a ten-month jail sentence. In April 2010, Lloyd was re-hired by the ABC for his current Lateline role.

== Education ==
Educated at St Gregory's College in Campbelltown, he graduated as dux, before going on to earn a bachelor's degree in journalism at Charles Sturt University in Bathurst.

== Career ==
Lloyd worked for the BBC, Sky News and two Australian commercial television networks in varying roles from presenter to program producer before working for the Australian Broadcasting Corporation.

Twice nominated for national awards, Lloyd covered news and events from India, Pakistan, Afghanistan, Nepal, Sri Lanka, Maldives, Bhutan and Bangladesh. Between 2002 and mid-2006, he was based in Bangkok, Thailand, covering the South East Asia region for the ABC. Reporting across the ten ASEAN states, Lloyd earned praise for distinguished reporting of the 2002 and 2005 Bali bombings and 2004 Indian Ocean tsunami disaster.

== Drug arrest ==
On 18 July 2008, Singaporean police arrested Lloyd and charged him with possession of 0.8 grams of methamphetamine (the drug 'ice'), one smoking pipe and six syringes. The Singaporean police said that his urine tested positive for amphetamines and he was being investigated for trafficking a controlled drug. Lloyd was released on bail of S$60,000, posted by his partner Mohamed Mazlee bin Abdul Malik.

In November 2008, Singapore's Attorney-General dropped the harsher trafficking charge against Lloyd, leaving him to face four lesser charges.

On 2 December 2008, Lloyd was sentenced to 10 months in jail after pleading guilty to three of the charges and on 23 June 2009 was released early for good conduct.

Lloyd returned to work for the ABC as a senior journalist on Lateline in April 2010.

He has recounted his experiences with the Singaporean justice system in a book, Inside Story, published in October 2010.
