= Kinross Wolaroi School =

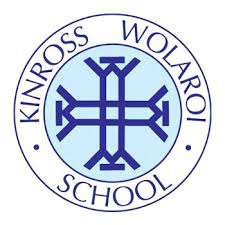

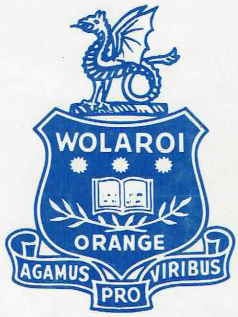
- Central West; Orange, New South Wales

Information
- Former name: Wolaroi Methodist Boys' College
- Type: Independent co-educational early learning, primary, and secondary day and boarding school
- Motto: Latin: Scientia, Amicitias, Integritas (Knowledge, Friendship, Integrity)
- Denomination: Uniting Church
- Established: 1886; 140 years ago (as Wolaroi College); 1928; 98 years ago (as Presbyterian Ladies' College, Orange); 1975; 51 years ago (as Kinross Wolaroi School)
- Founder: Thomas Henry Richards
- Chairman: Rev. A. Cunningham
- Headmaster: Mr Timothy Kelly
- Chaplain: Rev. S. Yabsley-Bell
- Employees: 320
- Years: Early learning and K–12
- Gender: Co-Educational
- Enrolment: c. 1,100 (2020)
- Campus type: Regional
- Colour: Two Blues
- Rival: St Stanislaus' College
- Yearbook: The Tower
- Affiliations: Independent Schools Association; Association of Heads of Independent Schools of Australia; Junior School Heads Association of Australia; Australian Boarding Schools' Association; Association of Independent Co-Educational Schools; Western Associated Schools; NSW Combined Independent Schools; Round Square
- Alumni name: Wolarovians
- Website: kws.nsw.edu.au

Kinross Wolaroi School is an independent Uniting Church co-educational early learning, primary, and secondary day and boarding school, located in Orange, New South Wales, 260 kilometres (160 mi) west of Sydney, New South Wales, Australia. Established in 1886 it is the oldest school in Orange and operates across two campuses and serves students from early learning to Year 12. The modern school was formed in 1975 through the amalgamation of Wolaroi Methodist Boys' College and The Kinross School (formerly Presbyterian Ladies' College, Orange).

Kinross Wolaroi is a non-selective school and educates approximately 1,100 students, including around 350 boarders, across three sections: Pre-Preparatory, Preparatory, and Senior School.

The school's affiliations include the Association of Heads of Independent Schools of Australia, Junior School Heads Association of Australia, Australian Boarding Schools' Association, Association of Independent Co-Educational Schools, the Independent Schools Association, and Round Square.

== History ==
The school traces its origins to 1886 with the foundation of Weymouth House. In 1975, Weymouth House's successor, Wolaroi College, amalgamated with The Kinross School to form Kinross Wolaroi School, which subsequently enteried the Uniting Church in Australia in 1977.

=== Wolaroi Methodist Boys' College ===
==== 1886-1925 ====
Weymouth House, was opened in 1886, in the Union Bank building in Orange. The School was founded by Thomas Henry Richards, who served as its sole owner and teacher after relocating to Orange from All Saints College in Bathurst. In 1893 Richards purchased the Wolaroi mansion, built by John Charles McLachlan, allowing the School to relocate to a larger campus. The move coincided with a change of name to Wolaroi Grammar School.

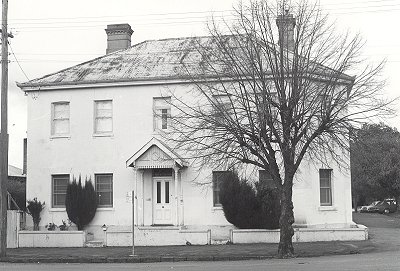
The Union Bank Building in Orange, where Weymouth House was established in 1886.

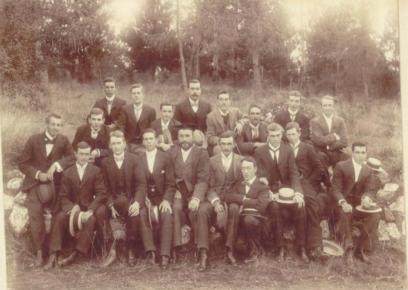
Very early Weymouth House photo with T. H. Richards seen in the centre

In 1913, Charles Campbell secured Wolaroi and became the third headmaster. In 1925, his successor, Mr. Connell, left Orange to join the staff of The Kings School in Parramatta. He therefore sought someone to purchase the School. This provided an opportunity for the Methodist Church to secure the continuation of the College.

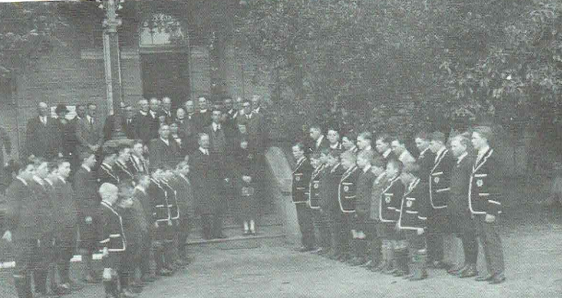
Visit by the Governor-General, Lord Stonehaven, in 1926

==== 1926-1945 ====
In 1925, the Methodist Church assumed control of the school, renaming it Wolaroi Methodist Boys' College. The college reopened in 1926 under the direction of Stanley Brown who oversaw a broadening of the curriculum and programs offered. Brown is credited with stabilising the College finances during his tenure as Headmaster. The College Council later honoured him by naming the entrance gates "The Stanley Brown Memorial Gates".

==== 1945-1975 ====
The period following the Second World War and in particular the period from 1950 to 1962 was the greatest period of expansion for Wolaroi. Under Headmaster D.A. Trathen enrollments more than doubled, and new facilities were constructed. This period of expansion also included a tightening of both academic and sporting standards.

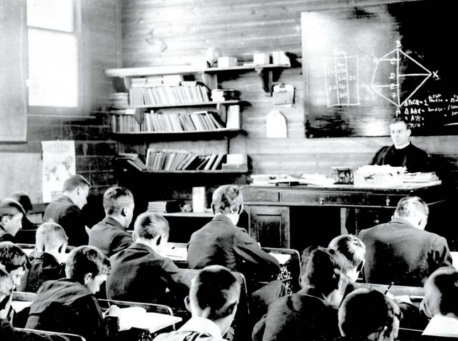
A Wolaroi Grammar Classroom, c.1905

In 1971 Wolaroi College was visited by the Sultan and Sultana of Selangor, whose son, Tengku Abdul Samad Shah, was a student of the college at the time.

By the early 1970s, following a drought in Western NSW, the college faced financial difficulties and declining enrollments. In 1973, amid a societal attitudes regarding single-sex education the College Council began investigating the feasibility of becoming a co-educational school. This culminated, when in 1975 the Wolaroi College Council resolved to amalgamate with The Kinross School.

=== Presbyterian Ladies' College (The Kinross School) ===
There had been substantial Scottish immigration to Orange since its foundation in the 19th century which had led to a sizeable Presbyterian community. Throughout the 1920s the Presbyterian community realized that there was a need for the establishment of a girls' school that could provide a well-rounded education based upon the ideals found within reformed Christianity. In response to this The Presbyterian Ladies' College (PLC) opened in Orange in 1928 on a 43-acre site, named "Campdale". With Miss Eleanor Linck as its first Headmistress. Dorothy Knox took over in 1932 and she led the school until 1936. After which point Ina Miller became headmistress for 33 years.

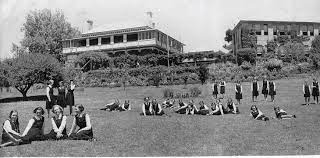
PLC Orange c.1950

In 1973, PLC became co-educational, and changed its name to The Kinross School. During this time Wolaroi was suffering from financial difficulties and the Methodist Church approached the Presbyterian Church to take over management of Wolaroi. In 1975 both The Kinross School Council and Wolaroi College Council agreed to amalgamate.

=== Kinross Wolaroi School ===
==== 1975-2015 ====
In 1975 Wolaroi College amalgamated with The Kinross School to form Kinross Wolaroi School. Following the formation of the Uniting Church in Australia in 1977, the School came under that denomination.

Alan Anderson was appointed headmaster in 1978 and served until 2001. In his first year he declined to announce a Dux, citing low academic standards. During his tenure he introduced stricter discipline, tighter uniform regulations, restrictions on student leave, and compulsory cadets for boys from 1979, then extended to girls in 1983. In July 1979, around thirty boarders staged a protest on the main Wolaroi oval seeking relaxation of the new rules; they returned to their boarding houses after being warned they faced expulsion.

By 1988, enrollments had grown to 728 students, including 384 boarders, making it the largest co-educational boarding school in New South Wales and the fourth largest in Australia at that time. In 1989 continued expansion in boarding numbers led the school to lease of the Victorian-era Croagh Patrick House.

In 1998, the former preparatory principal at Kinross Wolaroi, John Thomas Kennett, was convicted of sex offences against twelve boys.

Rev. David Williams was appointed as Headmaster in 2002 and was succeeded by Brian Kennelly in 2007. Under Kennelly's leadership a building program was undertaken to upgrade infrastructure such as the Derek Pigot Auditorium.

==== 2016-2025 ====
In 2016, the school celebrated its 130-year anniversary and Dr Andrew Parry took over as the Headmaster of Kinross Wolaroi School.

In August 2016, SBS News reported that several Kinross Wolaroi School students were assaulted by adult spectators following a school rugby match between Kinross Wolaroi and St Stanislaus’ College in Bathurst. According to the report, a group of intoxicated spectators confronted players after the game, leading to a physical altercation in which a number of students were injured. The incident prompted discussion regarding spectator behaviour and supervision at inter-school sporting events, particularly between rugby rival schools Kinross Wolaroi and St Stanislaus'.

In July 2020 several former students alleged they had been instructed to remove or alter naturally textured afro hair and protective braided hairstyles in order to comply with school grooming policy. The school responded that its current grooming policy does not prohibit any specific hairstyles, but requires boys’ hair to be “near and off the collar without any "unorthodox" cuts or colours.” The headmaster said that "existing school grooming standards which do not accommodate the natural hair texture and growth of African and Indigenous students have been identified as one issue faced by these students".

== Campus and heritage ==
The School occupies 100 acres across two campuses in Orange.

=== The Wolaroi Mansion Building ===
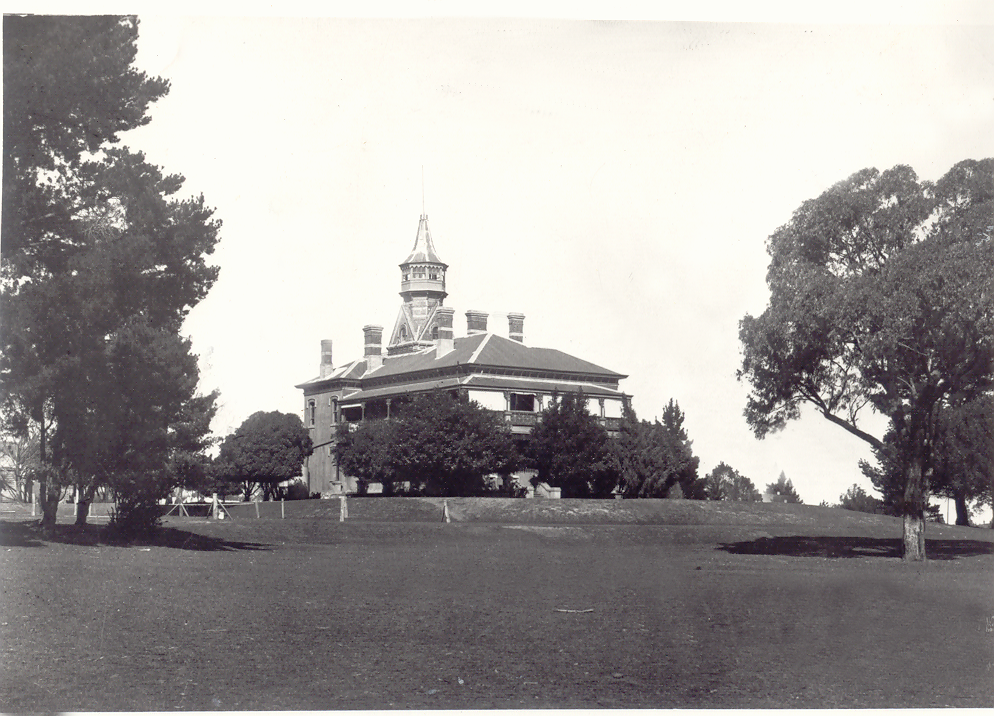
Wolaroi Mansion Building

The heritage listed Wolaroi Mansion was built by the architect John Hale for John C. McLachlan in 1884. The School, after having outgrown the original buildings, moved to Wolaroi Mansion and grounds in 1893. The building has housed the school dining hall, offices, classrooms, and functions as a boys boarding up until the present day.

The original building consisted of a drawing room, sitting room, dining room, breakfast room, seven bedrooms, four servants bedrooms, a study, servants hall, pantry, kitchen, scullery, laundry, dairy, cellar, children's playhouse, and a lumber room. The existing mansion was expanded following the taking over of the college by the Methodist Church in 1925.

=== The War Memorial Building ===
The War Memorial Building was constructed during the 1950s and were built with funds donated from the Old Boys' Association and the Methodist Church. The new building was opened on 8 December 1952 by the Rev. Professor G. Calvert Barber, President-General of the Methodist Church of Australasia and Professor of Theology, Queen's College, Melbourne.

=== The Stanley G. Brown Memorial Gates ===
The Stanley G. Brown Memorial Gates serve as the main entrance to the school's principal site on Bathurst Road. The gates were named in 1956, three years after Stanley Brown's death in 1953.

=== The Music / Performing Arts Centre ===
In 1991 The Music and Performing Arts Centre, designed by Roy Michael, was opened by Alan Jones and was celebrated by a gala concert compered by Rolf Harris actively involved 600 students.

Reporting on the event for radio station 2UE in November 1991, Jones described witnessing a Beating of the Retreat performance by the school's cadet corps on the main oval, noting with some surprise that girls took part alongside boys, and that he found the standard of discipline and precision remarkable. He went on to praise the gala open-air concert that followed as a showcase of the school's musical talent.

=== Sporting and Academic Facilities ===
Sporting facilities include eight playing fields, an indoor heated swimming pool, an outdoor pool, a gymnasium, a weights room, a boatshed, and courts for tennis, badminton, basketball and squash.

Academic facilities include a science centre, library, an Amphitheatre, and an auditorium.

== House System and Boarding ==
Houses form the basis for many school activities, including assemblies, competitions, and tutor group structures.

=== History of the house system ===
The houses were established in 1936 "to encourage greater keenness in all contests within the College". The boys were divided into three Houses - the Sir Neville House, the McLachlan House, and the Campbell House. In 1941 it was decided to reform the House system due to unhappiness surrounding the fairness of the current system, and so in 1941 the existing houses were abolished and replaced by two new houses, Brown and Wesley.

=== Day/Tutor Houses ===
House name	House Colours	Gender	Years active	Named in honour of	Link with the School	Notes
Sir Neville House	Unknown	Boys	1936-1941	Sir Neville Howse	Sir Neville was the MP for Calare and reopened Wolaroi in 1926.	
Campbell House	Unknown	Boys	1936-1941	Mr C. R. Campbell	The third Headmaster of Wolaroi from 1913 to 1925.	
Wesley House	Unknown	Boys	1941-1975	John Wesley	The founder of the Methodist Church.	
Brown House		Formerly Boys. Now Mixed	1941–Present	Stanley G. Brown	The fifth Headmaster of the College.	
Weymouth House	Unknown	Boys	1886–1890; 1955–1975	Weymouth House	The School attended by T. H. Richards, Weymouth College, a public school in England.	
McLachlan House		Formerly Boys. Now Mixed	1936–1941; 1969–Present	John Charles McLachlan	The original owner and builder of Wolaroi.	
Douglas House		Formerly Girls. Now Mixed	1950–Present	James Stuart Douglas	One of the founders of P.L.C. and Chairman of the College Council from 1932 to 1933.	
Gordon House		Formerly Girls. Now Mixed	1950–Present	Mr D.W.T. Gordon	One of the founding members of P.L.C.	
Dean House		Mixed	1986–Present	William Douglas Johnston Dean	Chairman of the School Council from 1975 to 1976.	
Richards House		Mixed	1986–Present	Thomas Henry Richards	The founder of the School.	
Williams House		Mixed	2016–Present	Rev. David Williams	Thirteenth Headmaster of the School from 2002 to 2006	
Blackman House		Mixed	2016–Present	Rev. Everard Harley Blackman OAM	The school chaplain from 1979 to 1989.	

=== Boarding Houses ===
Boarding is conducted across the school's two campuses, with boys’ boarding located on the Wolaroi site and girls’ boarding located on the PLC site. Both sites offer recreation centers, swimming pools, chapel facilities, dining halls and gym facilities.

House name	Years active	Gender & Campus	Named in Honour of	Notes
Wolaroi House	2015 –Present	Boys – Wolaroi	The Mansion designed by John Hale and built by J. C. McLachlan.	
Trathan House	1958 –Present	Boys – Wolaroi	Rev. D. A. Trathan, seventh Headmaster of Wolaroi College.	
Weymouth House	1982 –Present	Boys – Wolaroi	The original school founded by T. H. Richards in 1886.	
Tower House	1890 –Present	Boys – Wolaroi	The central tower of Wolaroi Mansion.	
Croagh Patrick House	1989 –1995	Boys – Wolaroi	The Mansion designed by John Hale and built by Edwin Lane	
Wyvern House	2026 – Present	Boys – Wolaroi	The Wyvern that surmounted the Wolaroi College crest	
New House	1950 –Present	Girls – PLC		
Stuart-Douglas House	– Present	Girls – PLC	Mr James Stuart-Douglas, one of the founders of P.L.C. and Chairman of the College Council from 1932 to 1933.	
Miller House	2003 –Present	Girls – PLC	Miss Ina Miller, Headmistress of P.L.C.	
Loader House	1985 –Present	Girls – PLC	Mr David Loader, the eleventh Headmaster of the amalgamated school.	

== List of Headmasters ==
Ordinal	Headmaster	Years	Periods	Citation
1	Mr T. H. Richards	1886 – 1904	Wolaroi College (1886–1975)	
2	Rev A. J. Rolfe	1904 – 1912	Wolaroi College (1886–1975)	
3	Mr C. R. Campbell	1913 – 1925	Wolaroi College (1886–1975)	
4	Mr N. Connell	1924 – 1925	Wolaroi College (1886–1975)	
5	Mr S. G. Brown	1926 – 1940	Wolaroi College (1886–1975)	
6	Rev E. A. Bennett	1941 – 1949	Wolaroi College (1886–1975)	
7	Rev D. A. Trathen	1950 – 1962	Wolaroi College (1886–1975)	
8	Mr D. H. Prest	1963 – 1968	Wolaroi College (1886–1975)	
9	Mr P. Brownie	1969 – 1972	Wolaroi College (1886–1975)	
10	Mr R. W. Buntine	1973 – 1974	Wolaroi College (1886–1975)	
11	Mr D. Loader	1975 – 1978	Kinross Wolaroi School (1975–Present)	
12	Mr A. Anderson	1978 – 2001	Kinross Wolaroi School (1975–Present)	
13	Rev D. Williams	2002 – 2006	Kinross Wolaroi School (1975–Present)	
14	Mr B. Kennelly	2007 – 2016	Kinross Wolaroi School (1975–Present)	
15	Dr A. Parry	2016 – 2025	Kinross Wolaroi School (1975–Present)	
16	Mr T. Kelly	2026 – Present	Kinross Wolaroi School (1975–Present)	

== Co-curricular activities ==
Co-curricular activities at the School began when a football team was formed in 1886. With other activities soon also being offered at the school including athletics, cricket, football, swimming, tennis, drama and debating. Other clubs included camera club, garden club, musical club, radio club, a scout troop (The Wyvern Patrol) and a junior farmers' club.

=== Sport ===
Sport is compulsory from Year 3 onwards. With students competing through the Western Associated Schools, the Independent Schools Association (ISA), the Association of Independent Co-Educational Schools (AICES), Orange Town Competitions and NSW Combined Independent Schools (CIS). Sports available to students include rugby, soccer/football, cricket, hockey, netball, basketball, water polo, swimming, rowing, tennis, squash, softball, diving, cross country running and aerobics.

==== Rowing ====
Rowing is conducted on Spring Creek Dam and is a prominent School program. The School compete in both domestic and international regattas including the NSW Head of The River, the Australian Rowing Championships and the Henley Royal Regatta.

Rowing begins in junior years, where students are introduced to the sport through their Physical Education classes. Since 2021, Kinross Wolaroi has held the title of top performing school at the NSW State Championships.

=== Cadet Unit (KWSCU) ===
The Kinross Wolaroi School Cadet Unit (KWSCU) was established over 60 years ago, and has a unit strength of 300 cadets. KWSCU is a member of the Australia Services' Cadet Scheme. Unless a student is selected in the band or orchestra, membership of the Cadet Unit is compulsory for all students in semester two of Year 7, Year 8 and the first semester of Year 9. A camp, bivouacs and leadership courses are held annually. The unit parades through Orange on Anzac Day, and also conducts a farewell parade to Senior Cadets (Year 12) and band members, and in recent years a Ceremonial Parade on Open Day. A formal mess night is held annually for the Senior Cadets and Band members, their parents, and officers.

Each platoon is commanded by a Cadet Under Officer (CUO), with the assistance of a Platoon Sergeant (SGT), and is divided into three sections, with each led by a Corporal (CPL). Rank is attained after a cadet with suitable experience attends and passes the relevant promotion course.

=== Music and performing arts ===
Ensembles include orchestra, concert and marching band, chamber ensembles, chamber strings and choral groups. Each ensemble performs at school events and ceremonies including the Kinross Wolaroi Performing Arts Festival. The school offers private tuition in woodwind, brass, strings, percussion, piano, voice and guitar. The School also stages an annual musical at the Orange Civic Theatre.

=== Other Activities ===
In 2017, Kinross Wolaroi School launched The Regional Engagement Enterprise (TREE) initiative, which provides community-based learning experiences, especially opportunities in local agribusinesses, for all students from Kindergarten to Year 12.

The School participates in the Duke of Edinburgh Award Scheme, stud cattle, cattle paraders, ski tour, public speaking, debating, art club, archives, computer club, photography club, crusaders, community service, peer support, young achievers and a student representative council.

== School affiliations ==
Kinross Wolaroi School is affiliated with the Association of Heads of Independent Schools of Australia (AHISA), the Junior School Heads Association of Australia (JSHAA), the Australian Boarding Schools' Association (ABSA), Association of Independent Co-Educational Schools (AICES) and is an associate member of the Independent Schools Association (ISA). In 2021 Kinross also joined the Round Square international schools program

== Notable alumni ==
Alumni of Kinross Wolaroi School, Kinross School, the Presbyterian Ladies' College, Orange, or Wolaroi Methodist Boys' College may elect to join the Kinross Wolaroi Ex-Students' Association. Alumni of Kinross Wolaroi are represented across politics, media and culture, business and science, and sport.

=== Government, Law and Public Service ===
- Susan Cullen-Ward (1958) – Susan of Albania. Australian born wife of Leka, Crown Prince of Albania (DEC)
- Belinda Neal (1980) – Former Labor Senator for NSW (1994–1998) and former Member for Robertson (2007–2010)
- Lord Vaea – Tongan politician who has served as Master of the Royal Household and currently serves as Speaker of the Tongan Legislative Assembly.

=== Arts, Media and Culture ===
- Sir Richard J F Boyer (c1895 - c.1900) - Chairman of the Australian Broadcasting Commission (ABC) from 1945 to 1961.
- Ken Hannam (1944) - Australian film and television director
- Ian Stapleton (1969) – Australian heritage architect

=== Business, Science and Academia ===
- Prof. Janet Carr (1949) – Physiotherapist and Academic, world authority on rehabilitation after stroke (DEC)
- George Finch, MBE FRS – Chemist, Fellow of the Royal Society and pioneering high-altitude mountaineer who participated in early expeditions to Mount Everest, setting an altitude record in 1922.

=== Sport ===
- Jason Belmonte (2000) – Professional tenpin bowler
- Edwina Bone (2005) – Australian International and Olympian Hockey player
- Nedd Brockmann (2016) - Ultramarathon athlete and motivational speaker
- Ashleigh Gardner – Cricketer
- Jo Garey (1991) - Australian national women's cricket team, 1995/96
- Grace Hamilton (2009) - Australian rugby union footballer who captained Australia internationally
- Phoebe Litchfield (2021) – Australian Cricketer
- Ben McCalman (2006) – Wallabies and Western Force Rugby Union player
- Jemima McCalman (2017) – Australian Rugby Union player, playing internationally for Australia and the Brumbies
- Kate Smyth (1990) - Commonwealth Games and Olympic (Beijing 2022) Marathon Runner
- John Sumegi (1974) – Olympic Silver Medalist in Canoeing 1980
- Jone Tawake (2000) – Brumbies rugby union player
- Chris Tremain (2009) – Big Bash League, Sheffield Shield and One Day International Cricket player
- Cody Walker (2015) – Australian Professional Rugby League Player, currently playing for South Sydney Rabbitohs
- Jono West – former NSW rugby union player
- Anna Windsor (1993) – Swimmer who competed at the Atlanta and Sydney Olympic Games

== Crest, Motto and Symbolism ==
With the merger of the schools the previous Latin mottos were abandoned and in 2008, the school adopted the new Latin motto of Scientia, Amicitia, Integritas (Knowledge, Friendship, Integrity). The school's five core values are Courage, Respect, Inclusiveness, Resilience and Commitment.

School Crest	Meaning	Reference
	Symbolism: The Wyvern surmounting the shield was part of the Coat of Arms of the family of John Wesley.; The Stars are symbolic of Ambition.; The open volume of Knowledge.; The laurel branch of Victory; Motto: 'Agamus Pro Viribus' - 'Strive With All Our Might'	
	Symbolism: A circular badge demonstrates the ideal of true community.; Eight stylised people form a stylised Latin Cross demonstrating the centrality of Christianity at the School.; The School's initials, 'KW', can be seen where the two figures meet in pairs.; Motto: 'Scientia Amicitia Integritas' - 'Knowledge, Friendship, Integrity'	

== See also ==
- List of non-government schools in New South Wales
- List of boarding schools in Australia
- Independent Schools Association
