= Oakhill College =

Australia Catholic educational institution

Location
- Castle Hill, Sydney, New South Wales; Australia; 33°43′25″S 151°1′12″E

Information
- Type: Independent comprehensive co-educational secondary day school Boys only Years 7–10 Co-educational Years 11–12
- Motto: Latin: Deo Duce (With God as our leader)
- Religious affiliation: De La Salle Brothers
- Denomination: Roman Catholic
- Established: 1936; 90 years ago
- Founder: De La Salle Brothers
- Educational authority: New South Wales Department of Education
- Chairman: John Puleo
- Principal: Br Steve Hogan fsc
- Employees: 207
- Years: 7–12
- Enrolment: c. 2,068 (2023)
- Colours: Maroon and gold
- Affiliation: Independent Schools Association
- Website: oakhill.nsw.edu.au

Oakhill College is an independent Roman Catholic comprehensive co-educational secondary day school, located in Castle Hill, a suburb in the Greater Western region of Sydney, New South Wales, Australia.

Founded in 1936, the College is run by the De La Salle Brothers in the tradition of Saint Jean-Baptiste de La Salle, and currently caters for 2,068 students from Years 7 to 12 in 2023.

Oakhill College is a member of the Independent Schools Association.

== History ==
The De La Salle Brothers purchased the Oakhill property in 1932. The College commenced in August 1936 with four male students, increasing to 30 in 1937 when there were 10 day and 20 boarding students. The College served the then rural area of "The Hills", and grew slowly until in 1953, its enrolment reached 100.

In 1974, the decision was taken to phase out the boarding school and, in 1976, Oakhill College became a co-educational senior school. In the year 2006, the 100th year of the Brothers in Australia was celebrated with a mass at St Mary's Cathedral.

The property was initially used as a training college for brothers; the school came later. The training college for brothers evolved into a training college for Catholic lay teachers, which was then merged into the Australian Catholic University in the 1980s, which then became the Castle Hill campus of the ACU. Finally, in the 1990s, the ACU decided to consolidate their campuses in Sydney, and abandoned their Castle Hill facility, which then reverted to the De La Salle brothers. Since then, the original training college has been extensively renovated, named the De La Salle Building and forms part of the College. The College was owned and administered from 1936 until 2008 by the Trustees of the De La Salle Brother's Australia. Oakhill College is governed by a Board of Directors. In 2024 Oakhill college purchased the whole college property from the De La Salle Brothers.

== Facilities ==
The Innovation Hub is the newest addition to the College campus, with a new addition of the Learning Commons to open in 2024. The Centenary Sports Centre was built during the course of 2006, and was opened in late November 2006. It has a 25-metre pool, classrooms, cemetery, Chapel, tennis courts, Drama Theatre, green room, agriculture centre, farm, hall, kitchen, canteen, Library, Uniform Shop and a gym. The main part of the centre is a double basketball court, which is also used for College assemblies and connects to the Benildus Hall.

== Global Experiences ==
Oakhill College offers students across various faculties the chance to explore different countries globally, immersing themselves in real-world applications of their curriculum and service. Oakhill College has a tradition of conducting immersion trips in the school holidays to support the work of the Lasallian Foundation, named The Lasallians Without Boarders Trip (LWOB). These opportunities offer Oakhillians the chance to practice ‘Faith, Service and Community’ in the Lasallian tradition. The list of offered trips are:

- LWOB India (Year 11)
- LWOB Fiji (Year 11)
- Cambodia/Vietnam Tour (Year 9/10)
- Ruby Tours - Fiji/New Zealand (Years 9-11)
- Girls Sport Tour - New Zealand (Years 11-12)
- Performing Arts Tour - New York City USA (Year 12)
- Science Tour - New Zealand (Years 11-12)
- Basketball Tour - USA

== Co-curricular ==
The College offers a large range of co-curricular activities, such as: Theatresports, Show Team, Debating, Public Speaking, Coding Club, Chess Club, Basketball, Rugby, Rugby 7s, Football, Tennis, Touch Football, Cricket, Hockey, Athletics, Netball, Swimming, Drama Club, Cheerleading, Choirs, Music Ensembles, Duke of Edinburgh, Art Club, Youth Group, Science Club and Mathematics Enrichment. Oakhill College conducts a major musical every two years, and a junior musical every alternate year, open to any student within the required year groups. However since 2023, years 7-12 participated in the college musical, Footloose 2023 being the inaugural junior and senior whole school musical, directed by Warren Flanangan. Additionally, Year 10 and 12 respectively stage plays in the later part of the school year, with the cast and crew composed entirely of drama students, whose performance is graded and forms part of their assessment mark.

== Notable alumni ==
=== Academia, business, public service and politics ===
- Dominic Perrottet, 46th Premier of New South Wales (Finished studies at Redfield College Dural)
- Greg Whitby, Executive Director of Schools, Catholic Education Office

=== Media, entertainment and the arts ===
- Brian Castro, novelist and essayist (also attended St. Joseph's College, Hunters Hill)
- Dan Ilic, Comedian, broadcaster, filmmaker, host of Hungry Beast
- Steve Le Marquand, actor
- Tim Rogers, vocalist/guitarist and primary songwriter of Australian alternative rock band You Am I
- Ben Quilty, Australian painter
- Tara Rushton, Fox Sports Football TV Host, model and actress (KateModern)
- Doris Younane, actress (McLeod's Daughters)

=== Sport ===
- Lachlan Anderson, rugby player and Rugby 7s Olympian
- Jason Baitieri, rugby league footballer
- Katherine Bates, an Australian Olympic cyclist
- Kieren Briggs, AFL player with the GWS Giants
- Grant Brits, an Olympic swimmer, bronze medallist in the 4 × 200 m freestyle relay at 2008 Beijing Olympics
- Bart Bunting, a dual Gold Medallist at 2002 Winter Paralympic Games, Salt Lake City, USA
- Catherine Cox, netball player and commentator
- Nerida Stewart, coach of Giants Netball team
- Nicholas Fitzgerald, a football player with the Melbourne City F.C.
- Harrison Goddard, U20 Melbourne Rebels, U20 Wallabies
- John Iredale, soccer player
- Kieren Jack, AFL player with the Sydney Swans
- Brandon Jack, AFL player with the Sydney Swans
- Luke Keary, rugby league footballer
- Julian Khazzouh, NBL basketball player
- Andrew Ogilvy, basketball player
- Ryan Papenhuyzen, rugby league footballer
- Jordan Thompson, tennis player
- Steven Ugarkovic, football player with the Newcastle Jets
- Julia Wilson, Olympic rower

== See also ==
- List of Catholic schools in New South Wales
- Catholic education in Australia
- La Sallian educational institutions
