= St Pius X College, Sydney =

St Pius X College

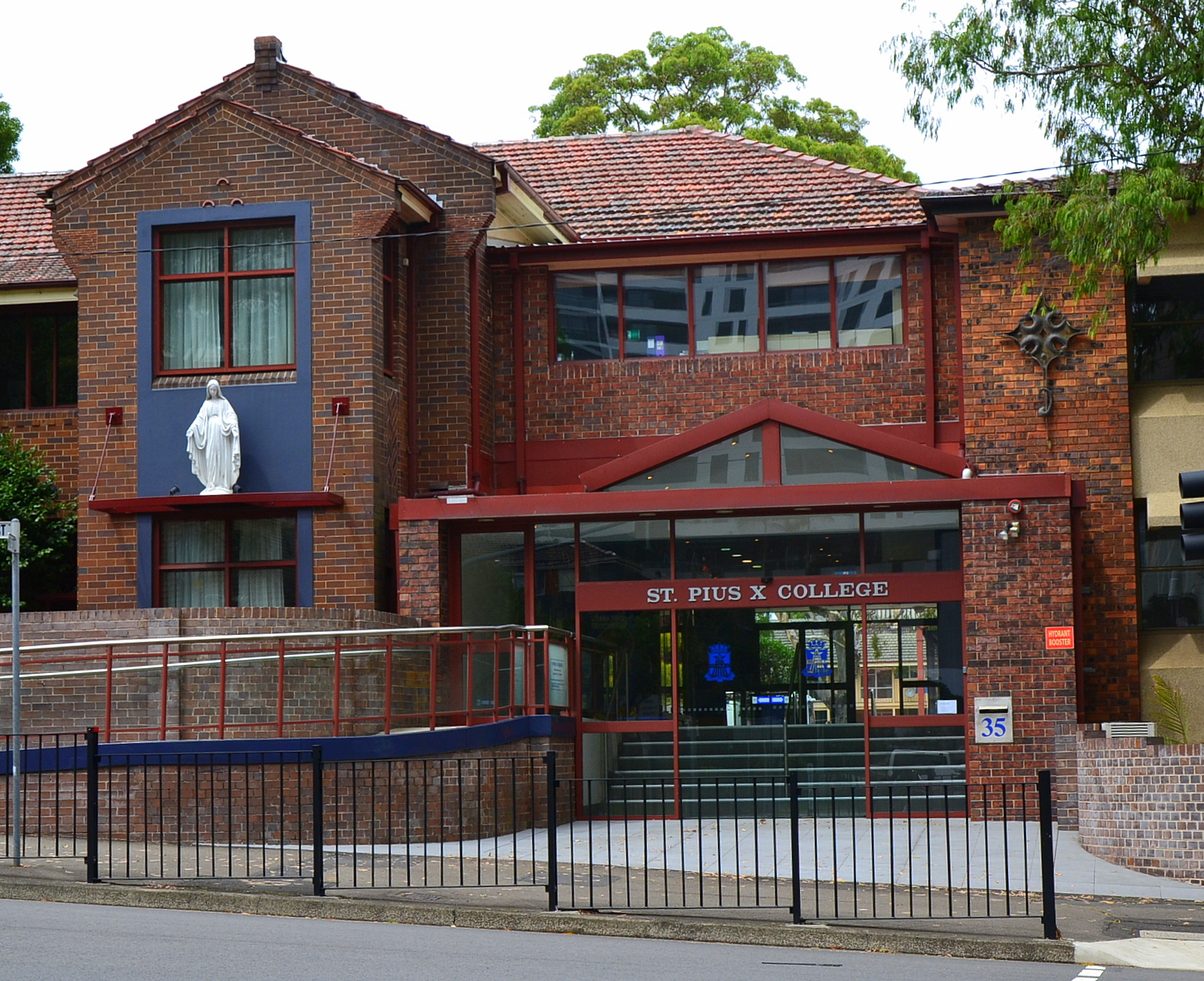
- Entrance to the College, pictured in 2014

Location
- Chatswood, Lower North Shore, Sydney, New South Wales; Australia; 33°47′41″S 151°11′0″E

Information
- Former name: Christian Brothers Chatswood
- Type: Independent primary and secondary day school
- Motto: Latin: Fide et Labore (Through Faith and Hard Work)
- Religious affiliation: Catholicism
- Denomination: Congregation of Christian Brothers
- Patron saint: Saint Pius X
- Established: 1937; 89 years ago
- Educational authority: New South Wales Department of Education
- Oversight: Diocese of Broken Bay
- Trust: Edmund Rice Education Australia
- Principal: Michael Ronchetti
- Staff: ~84
- Years offered: 5–12
- Gender: Boys
- Enrolment: c. 1,100 (2007)
- Colours: Blue and gold
- Nickname: Pius
- Affiliations: Independent Schools Association; Junior School Heads Association of Australia
- Website: www.spx.nsw.edu.au

St Pius X College (abbreviated as Pius or SPX) is an independent Catholic primary and secondary day school for boys, located in Chatswood, a lower North Shore suburb of Sydney, New South Wales, Australia. The school was established by the Congregation of Christian Brothers in 1937 and is operated under the auspices of Edmund Rice Education Australia. Oversight of the school is provided by the Catholic Education Office of the Diocese of Broken Bay. Located in the heart of the Chatswood central business district, the school is close to Westfield Shopping Centre and Chatswood railway station.

In 2005, the College was ranked 101st in New South Wales for the Higher School Certificate marks, up from 108th the previous year. More recently, in 2013, the school again improved its rank to 73. However, as of 2023 this rank has since fallen to 185th place. It is a member of the Independent Schools Association (ISA) and the Junior School Heads Association of Australia.

The college operates as two separate schools: the "Junior School" catering for boys in Years 5 and 6, and the "Senior School" catering for boys in Years 7 to 12.

== History ==
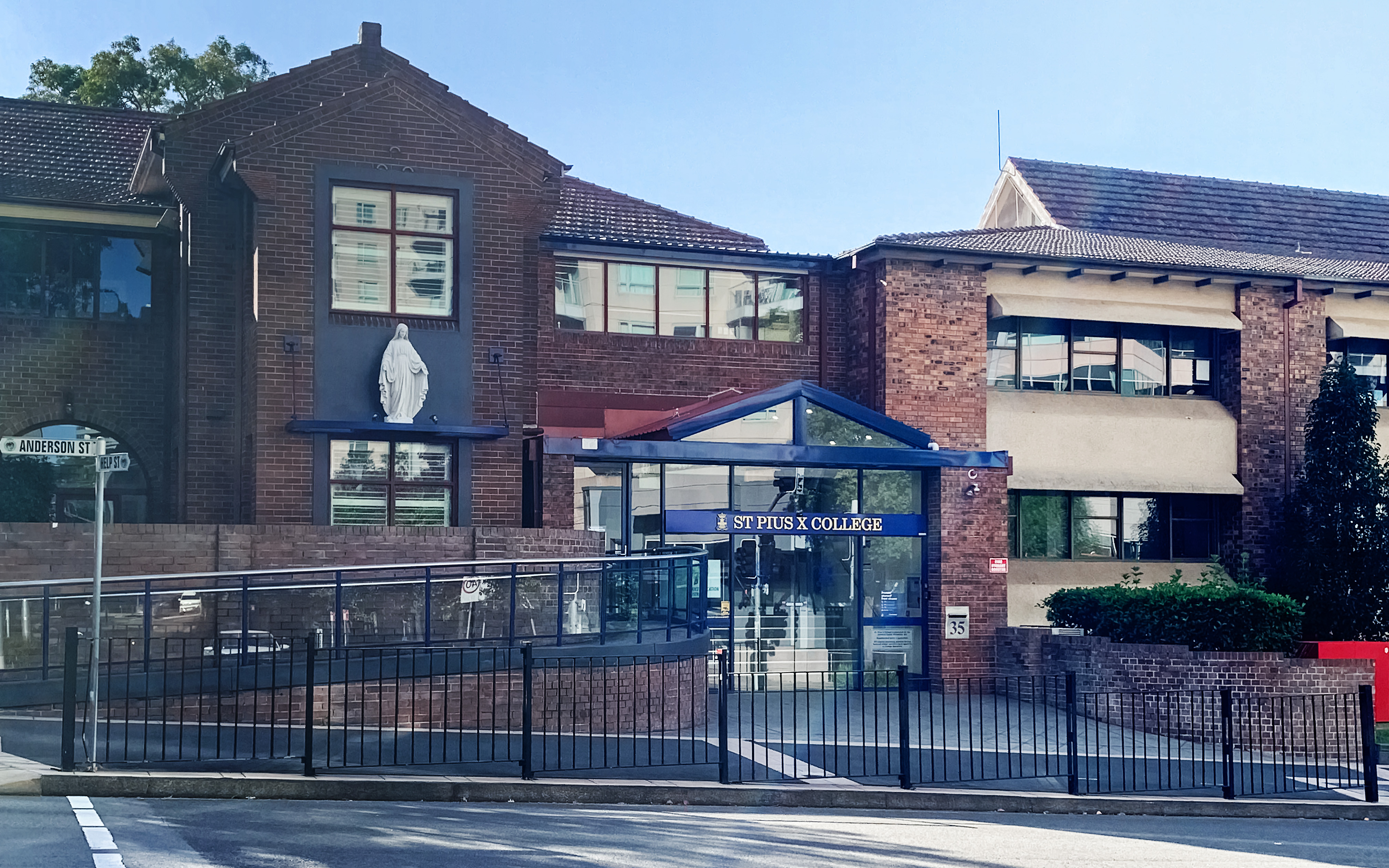
Street View of Front Entrance to college, in 2020

St Pius X College started in 1937 as Christian Brothers Chatswood.

St Pius X College used to be a coeducational school, partnered with Mercy College; however, during the 20th century the partnership ended and each school became single sex.

In 2013, the school implemented an E-Learning program, which provides students with personal learning devices across the school.

Commencing construction in November 2021, the Waterford Learning Centre, adjacent to the Chatswood Campus, is a major expansion to the College acting as a new learning centre for staff and students. Containing two levels, it will provide eight new classrooms that can be used as flexible indoor and outdoor learning spaces. It is estimated to cost approximately $8 million.

== Extra-curricular activities ==
=== Sport ===
The school participates in rugby, cricket, football, basketball, tennis, softball, swimming, squash, chess and athletics.

A house system has existed at St Pius X from before 1952, involving four basic colours of red, green, blue, and gold. However, in 1952 the houses were named after four Christian Brothers and house war cries were introduced. In 2010, the school instituted new mottos and crests for the houses, creating the 'House Cup' as the annual internal trophy.

House	Colour	Christian Brother	House Cup wins	Year of wins
Barron		Patrick Barron	4	2013, 2016, 2017, 2019
Purton		David Purton	4	2010, 2015, 2020, 2023
Rice		Edmund Rice	3	2011, 2018, 2026
Treacy		Patrick Treacy	6	2012, 2014, 2021, 2022, 2024, 2025

=== Debating and public speaking ===
The college also participates in debating and public speaking. It is a member of the Catholic Schools Debating Association, the largest debating competition for schools in New South Wales and has since 2015 participated in the Sydney Debating Network. It enters students into the Legacy Youth Public Speaking and Plain English Speaking Competitions annually. In 2015 the 11A debating team were runners up in the CSDA debating competition and were awarded the prestigious Aggregate Senior shield for winning the most debates out of any school in the competition. Following this in 2016 the 12A team were Grand Final winners of the CSDA Senior Opens debating competition winning the Michael Robson Shield as champions of the Senior Competition.

== Notable alumni ==
- Jackson Bird — Australian cricket player for the Tasmanian Tigers and the Hobart Hurricanes
- Josh Duinker — professional basketball player, Former player for the Kumamoto Volters
- Robert Fitzgerald AM — commissioner of Community Services Commission, New South Wales
- Ben Fordham — journalist and broadcaster, Nine Network and 2GB
- Peter Fricker OAM — former CEO Australian Institute of Sport
- Des Hasler — former rugby league footballer and coach of the Canterbury-Bankstown Bulldogs and Manly Warringah Sea Eagles
- Michael Hooper — Former rugby union footballer for the Wallabies and Waratahs
- Peter Ingham — auxiliary bishop of Sydney 1993–2001; bishop of Wollongong 2001–present
- Luke Jones — Former rugby union footballer for the Melbourne Rebels
- David Kilcullen — strategist and counter-insurgency expert
- Michael Malone — bishop of the Roman Catholic Diocese of Maitland-Newcastle; chair of the Australian Catholic Bishops' Conference Commission
- Martin Plaza — founding member, vocalist and guitarist of Mental As Anything.
- Pat Reilly — mayor of the City of Willoughby from 1997 to 2014
- Paul Scully-Power (Astronaut) - first Australian-born person to journey into space
- Greg Sheridan AO — foreign affairs editor, The Australian newspaper
- Peter Thompson — Former ABC TV presenter
- James Tucker — rugby union footballer for the Waikato
- Timm van der Gugten — cricket player for Netherlands, the Tasmanian Tigers and the Hobart Hurricanes
- John Watkins AM — former Deputy Premier of New South Wales, Minister for Transport, and Minister for Finance
- Francis Webb — poet

== See also ==
- List of non-government schools in New South Wales
- List of Christian Brothers schools
- Catholic education in Australia
