= Gertrude Amy Roseby =

(1872–1971) Australian Congregationalist lay leader and headmistress

- Born: 20 April 1872; Dunedin, New Zealand
- Died: 27 December 1971 (aged 99); Willoughby, New South Wales
- Occupations: Headmistress, peace activist

Gertrude Amy Roseby OBE (20 April 1872 – 27 December 1971) was an Australian Congregationalist lay leader as well as school teacher, principal and co-owner of a school with her sister (Sarah) Mabel Roseby.

== Early life ==
Born in Dunedin, New Zealand on 20 April 1872, Roseby was the eldest of ten children born to Rev Thomas Roseby and his wife Sarah (nee Hooworth). Roseby's father was a Congregationalist minister. Her younger sister was Sarah Mabel Roseby and she would in time work for her as a maths teacher.

Roseby was privately tutored before entering the University of Sydney. She graduated with a Bachelor of Arts in 1895 with second class honours in logic and mental philosophy.

== Teaching career ==
Roseby taught at Rockhampton Girls' Grammar School, Queensland for eight years before travelling to Britain for further study. She completed a Diploma of Pedagogy at the University of London (1905). In the following two years, Roseby taught at the Wyggeston School for Girls in Leicester before returning to Australia.

In 1908, she became headmistress of Ascham, Darling Point. Roseby lived on site and served under principal HJ Carter. In April 1911, she bought Redlands School, Neutral Bay with her sister Mabel. Redlands was a school with 35 day girls and 8 boarders when she acquired it, and grew to 400 students under Roseby's direction. She also extended the grounds and buildings to accommodate the extra students. Roseby encouraged capable students to pursue university studies. The school was sold to the Church of England in 1945.

She was founder of Wybalena Hostel for Girls, Burwood and served as treasurer 1951–63. Roseby was also a member of the NSW Women's Inter-Church Council and the National Council of Women of New South Wales.

== Activism ==
Roseby was a member of the Women's International League for Peace and Freedom and the Rotary Peace Fellowship. She was a life member of the Congregational Women's Association and served as president in 1942 to 1946.

== Awards ==
Roseby was appointed an OBE in June 1958.
