= Independent Sporting Association (New South Wales) =

- Abbreviation: ISA
- Formation: 1990; 36 years ago
- Headquarters: Sydney, Australia
- Members: 19 Member Schools
- Official language: English
- Website: www.isa.nsw.edu.au

The Independent Sporting Association (ISA) is a grouping of independent schools in New South Wales, Australia, generally within 250 kilometres (160 mi) of the Sydney central business district, that are associated for the purposes of sporting competitions.

Members of the ISA often compete with members of the Great Public Schools (GPS) and Combined Associated Schools (CAS) in trial and representative fixtures.

Of New South Wales' 130 Rhodes Scholars from 1904 to 2006, two have attended a school that is a member of the ISA.

== History ==
The Independent Sporting Association (ISA) was established to provide a distinguished and well-organized Saturday sporting competition for independent schools that stood outside the traditional frameworks of the GPS and CAS, yet shared the same belief in the formative value of school sport.

The origins of the ISA are traced to 1990, when a preliminary meeting convened at Pittwater House under the chairmanship of Martin Orrock. At this gathering John Giacon of St Patrick's College emerged as a driving force for the establishment of a structured inter-school sporting body.

These early discussions drew together a distinctive mix of schools. These included long-standing boys' schools such as St Andrews Cathedral School and St Patrick's College alongside co-educational colleges including Redlands, Oxley College, Chevalier College, and Central Coast Grammar School.

== Schools ==
=== Member Schools ===
Crest	School	Location	Enrolment	Founded	Denomination	Boys/Girls	Day or Boarding	School Colours	Also Known As
	Barker College	Hornsby	2,200	1890	Anglican	Boys & Girls	Day & Boarding	Navy and red	Barker
	Blue Mountains Grammar School	Wentworth Falls	600	1918	Anglican	Boys & Girls	Day	Gold and navy	BMGS
	Central Coast Grammar School	Erina	1,200	1985	Non-denominational	Boys & Girls	Day	Green, gold and navy	CCGS
	Chevalier College	Bowral	1,200	1946	Roman Catholic	Boys & Girls	Day	Maroon and light blue	Chevalier & Chev
	Cranbrook School	Bellevue Hill	1,680	1918	Anglican	Boys & Girls	Day and Boarding	Red, white and navy	
	Kinross Wolaroi School	Orange	980	1886	Uniting Church	Boys & Girls	Day & Boarding	Navy and sky blue	Kinross, KWS
	Oakhill College	Castle Hill	2,300	1936	Roman Catholic	Boys & Girls	Day	Maroon and gold	
	Oxley College	Bowral	500	1983	Non-denominational	Boys & Girls	Day	Navy and gold	
	SCECGS Redlands	Cremorne	1,600	1884	Anglican	Boys & Girls	Day	Navy, gold and white	Redlands
	Scots All Saints' College	Bathurst	~500	2019	Presbyterian	Boys & Girls	Day & Boarding	Navy, blue and red	Scots, SASC
	Snowy Mountains Grammar School	Jindabyne	400	1996	Anglican	Boys & Girls	Day & Boarding	Navy and gold	SMGS
	St Andrew's Cathedral School	Sydney	1,100	1885	Anglican	Boys & Girls	Day	Navy, light blue and white	Drews, SACS
	St Augustine's College	Brookvale	1,200	1956	Roman Catholic	Boys	Day	Green, gold and red	Augies
	St Gregory's College	Gregory Hills	1,100	1926	Roman Catholic	Boys	Day & Boarding	Maroon and sky blue	Greg's
	St Patrick's College	Strathfield	1,430	1928	Roman Catholic	Boys	Day	Blue, black and gold	Pat's
	St Paul's Grammar School	Cranebrook	1,350	1983	Non-denominational Christian	Boys & Girls	Day	Navy, green and white	Paul's, SPGS
	St Pius X College	Chatswood	1,300	1937	Roman Catholic	Boys	Day	Blue and gold	Pius
	St Spyridon College	Maroubra	700	1983	Greek Orthodox	Boys & Girls	Day	Navy and white	Spyridon
	St Stanislaus' College	Bathurst	790	1867	Roman Catholic	Boys	Day & Boarding	Navy and white	Stannies, SSC

== Sports ==
- Rugby union
- Soccer
- Cricket
- Tennis
- Basketball
- Hockey
- Netball
- Swimming
- Athletics
- Softball
- Touch football

The Competition in some sports is split into a 1st Division and a 2nd Division with the stronger schools competing in the 1st Division. Rugby is one of these sports with Augies, Greg's, Kinross, Oakhill, Pat's, Pius and Stannies competing in the 1st Division competition.

== Results ==
=== Winter Sport Results ===
Winter Sport Winners
Year	Rugby	Football		Hockey	Netball	Tennis
Year	Rugby	Boys	Girls	Hockey	Netball	Tennis
2020	CANCELLED DUE TO COVID 19					
2021	CANCELLED DUE TO COVID 19					
2025	Augies	Pat's	Barker	Chevalier	Barker	Oakhill
2026						Oakhill

==== Rugby - Division One Results ====
Rugby Division One Full Results
Year	1st	2nd	3rd	4th	5th	6th	7th
2020	CANCELLED DUE TO COVID 19						
2021	CANCELLED DUE TO COVID 19						
2025	Auggies	Oakhill	Pius	Pat's	Stannies	Greg's	Kinross
2026	Auggies	Oakhill	Pat's	Stannies	Pius	Greg's	Kinross
2027							

=== Summer Sport Results ===
Summer Sport Winners
Year	Cricket	Athletics		Swimming		Cross Country		Tennis	Basketball	Softball	Golf
Year	Cricket	Boys	Girls	Boys	Girls	Boys	Girls	Tennis	Basketball	Softball	Golf
1991		SPC	CHEV								
1992		CHEV	RED								
1993		SPX	RED								
1994		SPX	CCGS								
1995		SPX	CCGS								
1996		SPX	RED								
1997		SPX	RED								
1998		SPC	OXL								
1999		SPC	OXL								
2000		SPC	OXL								
2001		Div 1-SPC Div 2-CCGS	Div 1-OXL Div 2-CCGS								
2002		Div 1-SPC Div 2-SACS	Div 1-OXL Div 2-SPGS								
2003		Div 1-SPC Div 2-SACS	Div 1-KWS Div 2-ASC								
2004		Div 1-SPC Div 2-SPGS	Div 1-KWS Div 2-CCGS								
2005		Div 1-SPX Div 2-RED	Div 1-KWS Div 2-BMGS								
2006		Div 1-SPC Div 2-CCGS	Div 1-KWS Div 2-OXL								
2007		Div 1-SPC Div 2-OXL	Div 1-KWS Div 2-BMGS								
2008		Div 1-OAK Div 2-SSC	Div 1-KWS Div 2-RED								
2009		Div 1-OAK Div 2-CCGS	Div 1-KWS Div 2-SACS								
2010		Div 1-SPC Div 2-AUG	Div 1-KWS Div 2-SACS								
2011		Div 1-SPC Div 2-AUG	Div 1-KWS Div 2-BMGS								
2012		Div 1-SPX Div 2-CCGS	Div 1-KWS Div 2-BMGS								
2013		Div 1-AUG Div 2-SSC	Div 1-KWS Div 2-ASC								
2014		Div 1-AUG Div 2-RFC	Div 1-KWS Div 2-OXL								
2015		Div 1-SPC Div 2-CCGS	Div 1-KWS Div 2-OXL								
2016		Div 1-SPC Div 2-SSC	Div 1-KWS Div 2-BMGS								
2017		Div 1-SPC Div 2-SSC	Div 1-KWS Div 2-BMGS								
2018		Div 1-SPC Div 2-OXL	Div 1-KWS Div 2-CHEV								
2019		Div 1-SPC Div 2-SPY	Div 1-RED Div 2-SPGS								
2020	CANCELLED DUE TO COVID 19										
2021	CANCELLED DUE TO COVID 19										
2022		Div 1-SPX Div 2-OXL	Div 1-BAR Div 2-SPGS								
2023		Div 1-OAK Div 2-BMGS	Div 1-BAR Div 2-BMGS								
2024		Div 1-OAK Div 2-SACS	Div 1-BAR Div 2-SACS	Div 1-OAK Div 2-RED	Div 1-BAR Div 2-SPGS						
2025		Div 1- Div 2-	Div 1- Div 2-	Div 1-OAK Div 2-SSC	Div 1-BAR Div 2-RED						
2026		Div 1- Div 2-	Div 1- Div 2-	Div 1- OAK Div 2- RED	Div 1- BAR Div 2- PAUL'S						

== See also ==
- List of non-government schools in New South Wales
- Athletic Association of The Great Public Schools of New South Wales
- Combined Associated Schools of New South Wales
