= Luke Jones (rugby union) =

Australian rugby union player (born 1991)

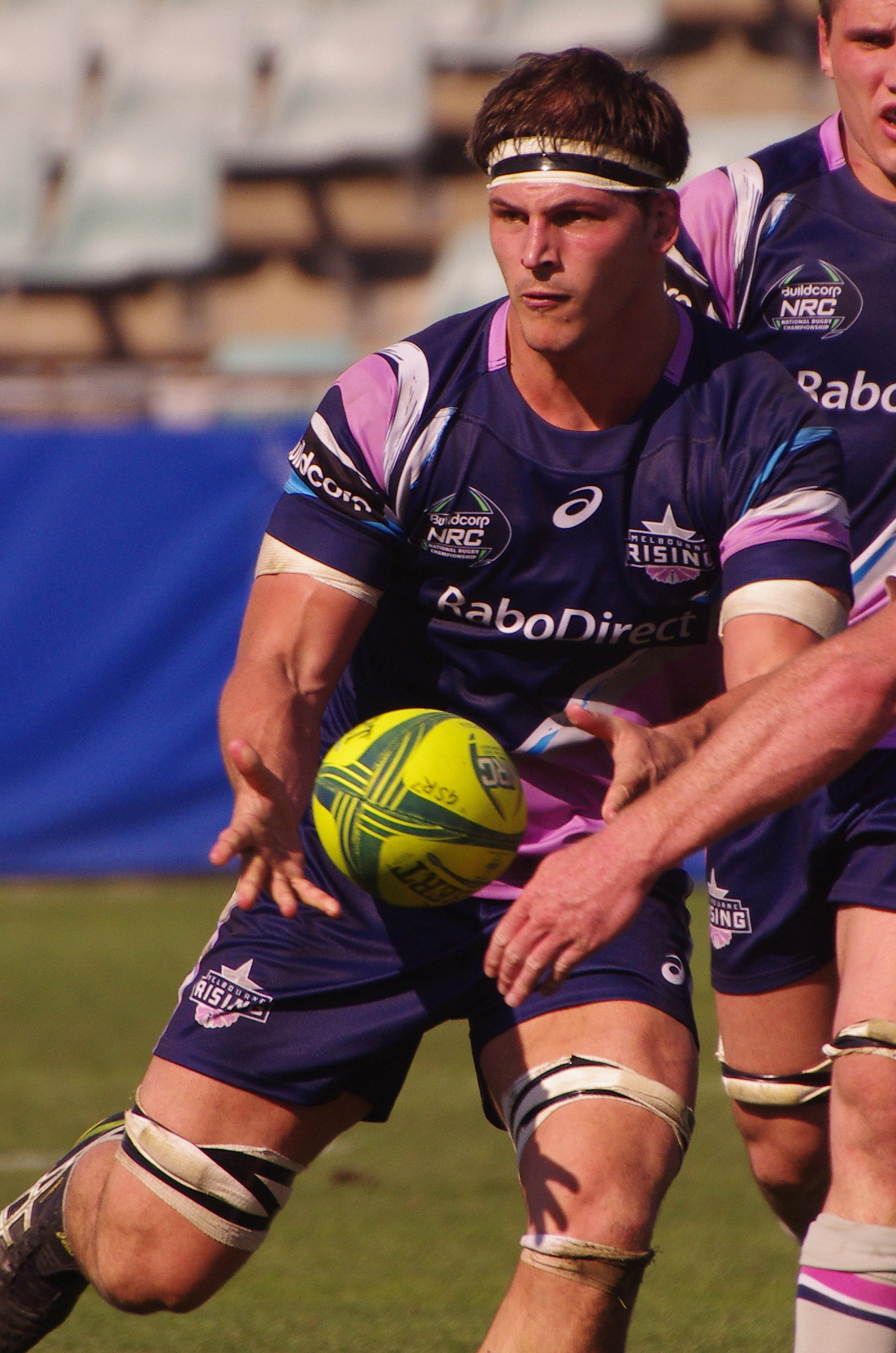
- Jones in 2014
- Born: Luke Maxwell Jones; 2 April 1991 (age 35) Sydney, New South Wales, Australia
- Height: 1.96 m (6 ft 5 in)
- Weight: 111 kg (17 st 7 lb)
- School: St Pius X College

Rugby union career
- Position(s): Lock, Flanker
- Current team: Sydney University
Senior career
Years	Team	Apps	(Points)
2014–2015	Melbourne Rising	14	(5)
2016–2019	Bordeaux	48	(10)
2019	Melbourne Rising	4	(0)
2020–2022	Racing 92		
- Correct as of 27 May 2020
Provincial / State sides
Years	Team	Apps	(Points)
2012	Manly	5	(5)
- Correct as of 21 July 2014
Super Rugby
Years	Team	Apps	(Points)
2010	Western Force	2	(0)
2011–2016	Melbourne Rebels	72	(5)
2019–2020	Melbourne Rebels	15	(0)
2023	Queensland Reds	0	(0)
- Correct as of 14 July 2023
International career
Years	Team	Apps	(Points)
2010	Australia U20	9	(5)
2014–	Australia	6	(0)
- Correct as of 30 November 2014

Luke Jones (born 2 April 1991) is a former Australian rugby union footballer. His regular playing position is either lock or flanker. He represents Racing 92 in the French Top 14 competition, having previously played for the Melbourne Rebels and the Western Force in Super Rugby.

== Playing history ==
Jones represented the Australian Schoolboys in both 2008 and 2009. He was a Schoolboys' captain in 2009, and named to play in a test against New Zealand in Brisbane. He also captained NSW Schools in 2009 at the Australian National Championships. He was selected to tour the UK with the Australian Schoolboys in late 2009, and selected again to play Ireland. Jones then returned to Australia to train with the Western Force in Perth. He had signed with the Force while at St Pius X College in Sydney, to become the first forward in Australian rugby to sign a full-time professional contract while still at school.

Jones had a busy 2010. He made his Super Rugby debut in Wellington against the Hurricanes; he hadn't yet turned 19 when he came off the bench to help Force captain Nathan Sharpe lock the scrum in the competition's second round. At the 2010 JWC in Argentina he scored one of Australia's nine tries to help the Australia wallop Scotland 58–13 in a pool match. And he helped Sydney Uni win its club competition.

In March 2010, it was announced Jones would leave the Force to transfer to the Melbourne Rebels ready for the 2011 Super Rugby season. In May 2011 he made his Rebels debut against the Cheetahs in South Africa. In June he received the 'Rebel Rising Player of the Year' award, and competed for Australia in the JWC in Italy. His JWC teammates included SPX alumni and flanker Michael Hooper (Brumbies from 2010), and prop Paul Alo-Emile (Rebels from 2012).

Jones began his 2012 Super Rugby season at number 6 (blindside flanker) in the Rebels season opener against the Waratahs. He continued with the Rebels in 2013 and 2014.

In 2013, Jones re-signed with the Rebels until the end of the 2016 Super Rugby season.

On 12 May 2020, Jones return to France to join Top 14 rivals Racing 92 ahead of the 2020–21 season.

On 18 July 2022, Jones returned home to Australia, signing with the Queensland Reds.

== Personal life ==
Jones currently studies a Bachelor of Commerce at Deakin University.

== Super Rugby statistics ==
As of 27 May 2020

Season	Team	Games	Starts	Sub	Mins	Tries	Cons	Pens	Drops	Points	Yel	Red
2010	Force	2	0	2	8	0	0	0	0	0	0	0
2011	Rebels	1	1	0	0	0	0	0	0	0	0	0
2012	Rebels	12	12	0	948	0	0	0	0	0	1	0
2013	Rebels	16	11	5	967	0	0	0	0	0	1	0
2014	Rebels	16	15	1	1177	0	0	0	0	0	0	0
2015	Rebels	15	15	0	1196	1	0	0	0	5	0	0
2016	Rebels	13	13	0	977	0	0	0	0	0	0	0
2019	Rebels	14	12	2	933	0	0	0	0	0	0	0
2020	Rebels	1	0	1	21	0	0	0	0	0	0	0
Total		89	78	11	6231	1	0	0	0	5	2	0
