= St Patrick's College, Strathfield =

St Patrick's College

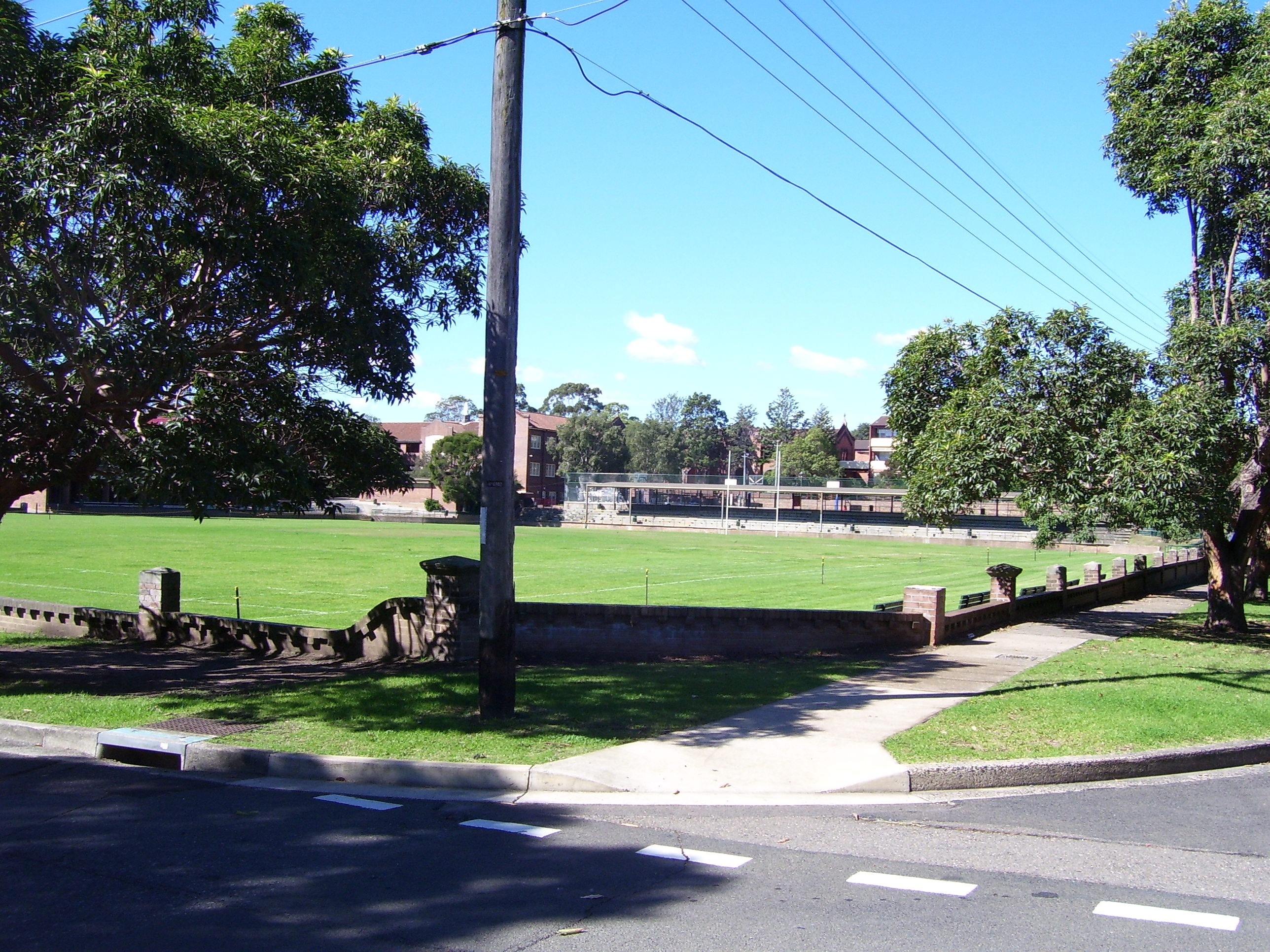
- A view of St Patrick's College from Kessel Square, in 2007

Location
- Strathfield Sydney; New South Wales; Australia
- Coordinates: 33°52′25″S 151°04′32″E

Information
- Other name: SPC; St Pats; Pats
- Type: Independent primary and secondary day school
- Motto: Latin: Luceat Lux Vestra (Matthew 5:16: Let Your Light Shine)
- Religious affiliation: Catholicism
- Denomination: Congregation of Christian Brothers
- Patron saint: Edmund Ignatius Rice
- Established: 1928; 98 years ago
- Founder: Patrick Ignatius Hickey
- Sister school: Santa Sabina College
- Educational authority: New South Wales Department of Education
- Trust: Edmund Rice Education Australia
- Chairperson: Caroline Butler-Bowdon
- Principal: Dr Vittoria Lavorato
- Chaplain: Fr Jack Evans
- Staff: ~140
- Years offered: 5–12
- Gender: Boys
- Enrolment: c. 1,450 (2020)
- Houses: Berg (white); Coghlan (gold); Crichton (black); Hanrahan (red); Hickey (green); Rice (blue)
- Colours: Blue, black and gold
- Affiliations: Independent Schools Association; Association of Heads of Independent Schools of Australia; Junior School Heads Association of Australia; Independent Sporting Association
- Website: www.spc.nsw.edu.au

St Patrick's College (known colloquially as SPC or St Pats) is an independent Catholic primary and secondary day school for boys located in Strathfield, an Inner West suburb of Sydney, New South Wales, Australia. Founded in 1928 by the Congregation of Christian Brothers, the school operates in the tradition of Edmund Rice, and is administered by Edmund Rice Education Australia. As of 2007, the College enrolled approximately 1,430 students from Year 5 to Year 12.

St Patrick's College is a member of the Independent Sporting Association, the Association of Heads of Independent Schools of Australia, and the Junior School Heads Association of Australia. In 2015, Business Insider Australia listed the College as one of the most exclusive schools for boys in Sydney.

== History ==
St Patrick's College was founded on 20 January 1928 as the St Patrick's Practice School. It functioned as a practice school for student teachers at the Australian Catholic University next to the south. The school was officially opened by Dr. M. Kelly, Archbishop of Sydney. Thirty-nine students were enrolled and split into three grades to be taught by Brothers L. S. Carroll, P. K. Kent and J. R. Crichton. The acting principal in the first year was Provincial Consulter and Master of Method M. B. Hanrahan. The school itself consisted of six large classrooms, and four other rooms designed for physics, chemistry, art, and technical training such as woodwork. At the end of the first year, over 100 students were enrolled at St Patrick's College.

At the end of the 1980s, there was a steady decline in the number of Christian Brothers teaching within Edmund Rice Schools such as St Patrick's. After the departure of J. Giacon as principal in 1992, the first lay principal in Christian Brothers’ school in New South Wales was appointed: Grahame Smollett, who became the longest-serving principal in the college's history.

== Principals ==
The following individuals have served as principal of St Patrick's College, Strathfield:

Ordinal	Officeholder	Term start	Term end	Time in office	Notes
1	Br M. B. Hanrahan	1928	1928	1 year	
2	Br E. S. Crowle	1929	1932	3 years	
3	Br M. R. Breen	1933	1935	2 years	
4	Br J. V. Coghlan	1936	1941	5 years	
5	Br B. Quirke	1942	1943	2 years	
6	Mr J. Samaan	1944	1944	1 year	
(4)	Br J. V. Coghlan	1945	1950	5 years	
7	Mr J. Benedict	1951	1952	2 years	
8	Br J. A. McGlade	1953	1955	2 years	
9	Br J. G. Hodda	1956	1961	5 years	
10	Br J. P. Hannigan	1962	1963	2 years	
11	Br H. C. Gygar	1964	1966	3 years	
12	Br T. I. Casey	1967	1974	7 years	
13	Br W. R. Greening	1975	1980	5 years	
14	Br J. P. O'Shea	1981	1987	6 years	
15	Br J. Giacon	1988	1992	4 years	
16	G. K. Smollett	1993	2007	14 years	
17	B. T. Roberts	2008	2015	7 years	
18	J. Murphy	2016	2016	1 year	
19	Dr Craig Wattam	2017	2020 (Term 3^{[note 1]})	2–3 years	
20	Dr Vittoria Lavorato	2021	2026	4–5 years	

^note 1: Dr. Craig Wattam finished at the conclusion of Term 3, 2020. He was replaced by Damian Chase for the final term.

== College houses ==
The house system dates back to the 1930s when boys were placed into four coloured houses for the annual swimming and athletic carnivals: Red, Gold, Green and Blue. During the 1970s the College expanded the four houses to six and named each after a significant person whose presence at the college had been pivotal to its development. In 1996 on the beatification of Edmund Rice, the 'Power' House was changed to 'Rice' House.

In 2012 the College Cup was launched and redefined the way in which the house system is used at St Patrick's College. In order to "foster healthy competition" amongst students, House points are awarded throughout the school year based on an individual's efforts in areas of academic achievement, co-curricular involvement and school spirit. These are then tallied with the results from the swimming and athletic carnivals, and a house is declared the overall winner.

Berg House pays tribute to the values and contribution made to the college by Brian Berg, the first Old Boy Brother to teach at St Patrick's. Brian Berg completed his Leaving Certificate at SPC in 1948 and entered into the Christian Brothers in 1950. Coghlan House honors the memory of J. V. Coghlan, Principal of St Patrick's College for two terms, 1936–1941 and 1945–1950.

Crichton House is named after John Rewi Crichton, who, for many years, was a teacher at St Patrick's College. Hanrahan House recognises the efforts of educationist Michael Benignus Hanrahan, the first Principal of St Patrick's College.

Hickey House honours a man who holds a significant place in the college's history, Patrick Ignatius Hickey. Rice house pays tribute to founder, Edmund Rice.

== Co-curriculum ==
The college performs an annual musical and drama production featuring its students and others from Santa Sabina College.

== College anthem ==
The College anthem was composed in 1958, with words by Br Robert Charles Hill and music by Br Colin Declan Smith – both members of the SPC community. A choir of over 600 voices first performed it at Speech Night in the Sydney Town Hall in 1958.

== College crest ==
The college's crest was designed in 1938 and is made up of three components:

- Shield: Combined with its chevrons and bars, it symbolizes strength and fortitude.
- Motto: Those who wear the crest pledge fidelity to the college motto Luceat Lux Vestra, Latin for "Let Your Light Shine".
- Star: Seen mounting the crest, it signifies that the college lights the way to knowledge and to God.

== Sexual abuse cases ==
In 2014, Brother Desmond Eric Richards pleaded guilty to assaulting four boys in New South Wales in the 1970s and 1980s, including one student at St Patrick's College while he worked there.

== Alumni ==
St Patrick's alumni are traditionally known as "Old Boys".

The reinvigoration of the St Patrick's College Old Boys’ Association (SPOB) in 2016 provides a contact point for several different Old Boy sporting clubs like Cricket, Rugby and Football and other special interest groups such as returned servicemen, careers and the Vestra Bursary Fund.

=== St Patrick's Rugby Club ===
St Patrick's Rugby Club was established in 1964 as a rugby league club as that was the code of football played at the college at the time. In 1965 the college changed to rugby union, and the club followed suit the following year and entered the Western Suburbs Under 20 competition. The club originally played in a white jersey with a black collar and now plays in a black jumper with a gold collar, as does the college First XV. The club plays in the New South Wales Suburban Rugby Union and has won four club championships and two first-grade premierships. Since its promotion to Kentwell Cup First Division in 1974, St Patrick's Rugby Club is one of only two clubs to never have been relegated. The club plays its home games at Hudson Park, Strathfield.

== See also ==
- List of Catholic schools in New South Wales
- Catholic education in Australia
