= Jono West =

Australian rugby union player (born 1979)

- Full name: Jonathan West
- Born: 23 October 1979 (age 47)
- Height: 6 ft 5 in (196 cm)
- Weight: 252 lb (114 kg)
- School: Kinross Wolaroi School

Rugby union career
- Position: Lock
Super Rugby
Years	Team	Apps	(Points)
2001–03	Waratahs	31	(10)

Jonathan West (born 23 October 1979) is an Australian former professional rugby union player.

West learned his rugby as a pupil at Kinross Wolaroi School in Orange.

A lock, West was an Australian under-19 and under-21 representative player. He played three Super 12 seasons with the New South Wales Waratahs and in 2003 toured Japan with Australia "A".

West had to retire prematurely aged 24 in 2004, due to a degenerative left knee injury.
