= Lachie Anderson =

Australian rugby union player

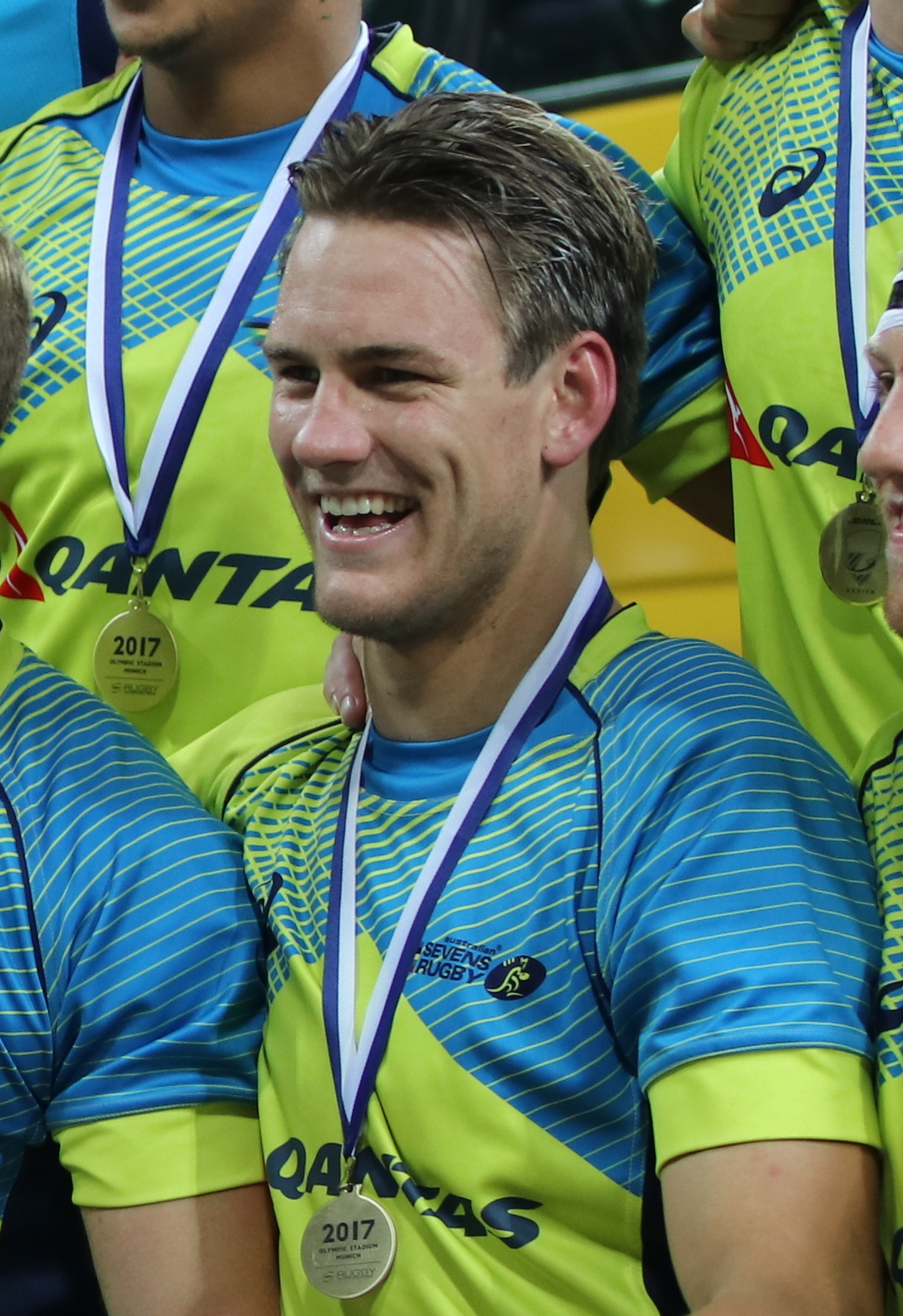
- Anderson with Australia Sevens in 2017
- Born: 27 August 1997 (age 29) Baulkham Hills, New South Wales, Australia
- Height: 188 cm (6 ft 2 in)
- Weight: 98 kg (216 lb; 15 st 6 lb)
- School: Oakhill College

Rugby union career
- Position: Wing
- Current team: Reds
Senior career
Years	Team	Apps	(Points)
2020	Eastwood	6	(5)
2020–2024	Rebels	36	(70)
2025–	Reds	23	(50)
- Correct as of 6 June 2026
International career
Years	Team	Apps	(Points)
2017	Australia U20	1	(0)
2023–	Australia A	3	(15)
- Correct as of 23 July 2021
National sevens team
Years	Team		Comps
2017–2021	Australia		27
- Correct as of 23 July 2021
Medal record
Boy's rugby sevens
Representing Australia
Commonwealth Youth Games
Silver medal – second place	2015 Apia	Team competition

Lachlan Anderson (born 27 August 1997), nicknamed "Lando", is an Australian professional rugby union footballer who plays wing for Super Rugby franchise the Queensland Reds, having formerly played for the Rebels, and the Australia national rugby sevens team. In his early career, he was selected to play in the 2017 World Rugby Under 20 Championships for Australia and plays for Shute Shield club Eastwood.

== Career ==
Anderson grew up in Baulkham Hills and played rugby for Dural rugby club. He was educated at Oakhill College where he played rugby and captained the first XV, the top representative team in secondary school with rugby league player Ryan Papenhuyzen. In rugby sevens he made his World Rugby Sevens Series debut in Sydney in 2017. Anderson has also represented his country at the 2018 Commonwealth Games.

Anderson was a member of the Australian men's rugby seven's squad at the Tokyo 2020 Olympics. The team came third in their pool round and then lost to Fiji 19-nil in the quarterfinal.

On 31 May 2025, Anderson scored a record-breaking four tries in the first half against the Fijian Drua. He became the first Reds player to score four tries in a game since the beginning of the professional era and joined Joe Roff (1996) and Drew Mitchell (2010) as the only Australian players to achieve this feat in Super Rugby.

In May 2026, Anderson re-signed with the Queensland Reds on a one-year deal.

== Super Rugby statistics ==
As of 3 June 2023

Season	Team	Games	Starts	Sub	Mins	Tries	Cons	Pens	Drops	Points	Yel	Red
2020 AU	Rebels	1	0	1	13	0	0	0	0	0	0	0
2021 AU	Rebels	4	4	0	279	2	0	0	0	10	0	0
2021 TT	Rebels	3	2	1	136	0	0	0	0	0	0	0
2022	Rebels	2	2	0	160	0	0	0	0	0	0	0
2023	Rebels	14	14	0	1,100	6	0	0	0	30	1	0
Total		24	22	2	1,688	8	0	0	0	40	1	0
