= Redlands, Cremorne =

Redlands
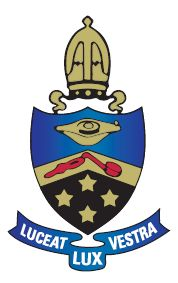

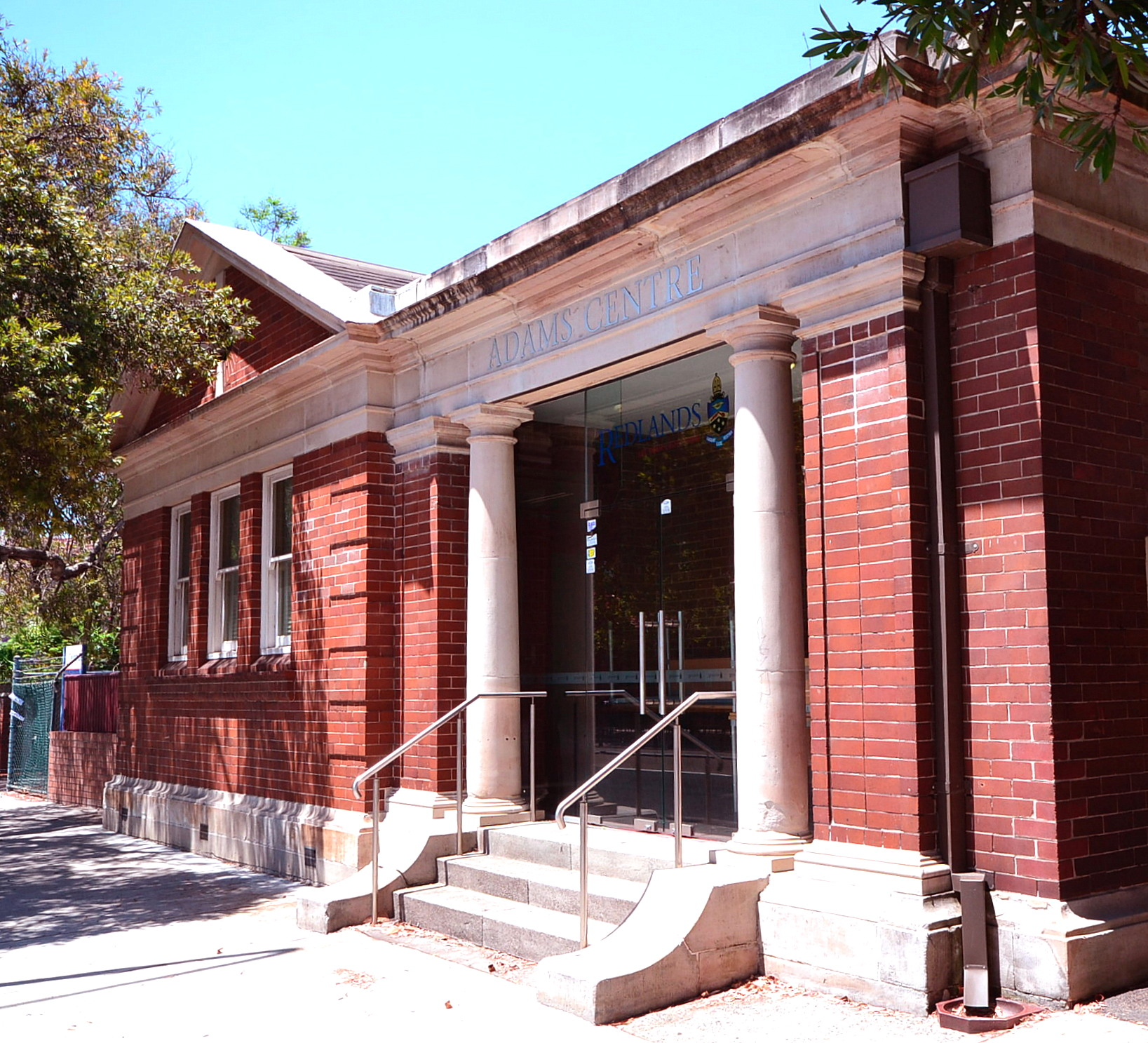
- Redlands, Adams Centre, pictured in 2012

Location
- Cremorne, New South Wales; Australia; 33°49′48″S 151°13′29″E

Information
- Former names: College for Girls (1884–1911); Redlands (1911–1945); Sydney Church of England Girls Grammar School, Redlands / SCEGGS Redlands (1945–1977); Sydney Church of England Co-educational Grammar School, Redlands / SCECGS Redlands (1978–2006); Redlands (2006–present)
- Type: Independent
- Motto: Latin: Luceat Lux Vestra (Let Your Light Shine)
- Denomination: Anglican
- Established: July 14, 1884; 142 years ago
- Educational authority: New South Wales Department of Education
- Chairperson: Glenn Wightwick
- Principal: Sean Corcoran
- Teaching staff: 184 (2022)
- Years: Early learning and K–12
- Enrolment: 1,765 (2023)
- Campus: Military Road (Secondary school); Murdoch Street (Early learning and primary school); Jindabyne (Outdoor education)
- Campus type: Suburban
- Colours: Blue and gold
- Affiliations: Independent Schools Association; Junior School Heads Association of Australia; Association of Independent Schools NSW; Council of International Schools
- Alumni: The Redlanders
- Website: www.redlands.nsw.edu.au

Redlands, Sydney Church of England Co-educational Grammar School, is a multi-campus independent co-educational early learning, primary, and secondary day Anglican school located in Cremorne on the Lower North Shore of Sydney, New South Wales, Australia. Established in 1884, the non-selective school caters to approximately 1,700 students, from early learning and on to kindergarten to Year 12.

Redlands is a member of the Association of Independent Schools NSW, the Independent Schools Association, the Junior School Heads Association of Australia, and the Council of International Schools.

== History ==
Redlands House c. 1916

Established in 1884 as the College for Girls in Milsons Point with five students, the school was originally run by Elizabeth Liggins and Clara Arnold as a single-sex boarding school. In 1899 the school moved to Cremorne under the name College for Girls, Redlands.

The school was then purchased by Gertrude Amy Roseby and her sister Mabel in 1911 who ran the school until 1945. In 1942, the school discontinued boarding.

Redlands later established an association with the Anglican Diocese of Sydney and became the Sydney Church of England Girls Grammar School, Redlands, in 1945, abbreviated as SCEGGS. The school severed legal ties with the Anglican Diocese in 1976, the same year in which it incorporated as SCEGGS (later SCECGS) Redlands. Whilst being reconstituted as an independent school, it retained the Church of England title in its name, which was also true for SCEGGS' other branch schools: SCEGGS Darlinghurst, SCEGGS Wollongong, SCEGGS Loquat Valley and SCEGGS Moss Vale.

In 1978, Redlands became coeducational, changing its title to Sydney Church of England Co-educational Grammar School, Redlands, or abbreviated as SCECGS Redlands.

Since the collapse of the Sydney Anglican SCEGGS schools, Redlands has been independently owned and operated by SCECGS Redlands Limited, a public company limited by guarantee. The school's board, whose current chairperson is Glenn Wightwick, appoints the school principal, monitors performance, manages the school's strategic vision and its resources.

Planned for a 20-year time span beginning in 2029, Redlands is planning a significant redevelopment of its current facilities called the Master Plan.

=== Principals ===
Ordinal	Officeholder	Term start	Term end	Time in office	Notes
1	Elizabeth Liggins & Clara Arnold	1884	1911	26–27 years	
2	Gertrude Amy Roseby	1911	1945	33–34 years	
3	Isobel Humphery	1946	1973	26–27 years	
4	Helen Foote	1974	1978	3–4 years	
5	Rod Wells	1979	1980	1 year	
6	Enid Lakeman (Acting)	1980	1980	1 year	
7	Peter Cornish	1981	2002	20–21 years	
8	Christopher Daunt Watney	2002	2006	3–4 years	
9	Neil Tucker (Interim)	2007	2007	0–1 years	
10	Peter Lennox	2008	2019	10–11 years	
11	Stephen Webber	2020	2022	1–2 years	
12	Sean Corcoran	2023	Incumbent		

== Motto ==
The Latin school motto of Redlands, Luceat lux vestra, is taken from Matthew 5, and translates to "Let your light shine". It appears in the school song which was shared with the other SCEGGS schools:

Students of Redlands School, those old and new
Gathered or parted, all the world through
Still to the motto that binds us keep true:
Luceat Lux Vestra.

== Academics ==
Redlands offers the International Baccalaureate as well as the New South Wales Higher School Certificate. Redlands has offered the International Baccalaureate since 1988, longer than any other school in NSW.

A large number of students choose the International Baccalaureate each year, with 92 out of 168 students choosing the curriculum in 2024. In 2024 seven students received an ATAR of over 99.

Six languages are taught at Redlands: French, Spanish, Latin, Mandarin and Japanese.

== Campus facilities ==
Redlands occupies two campuses in Sydney: the Senior School campus, which houses students from Years 7 to 12 and the Junior School campus, which houses students from preschool to Year 6. In addition the school operates the High Country Campus in Jindabyne.

=== Senior School ===
The Senior School is located on Military Road, Cremorne.

Peter J. Cornish, school principal from 1981 to 2002, created an association with the immediately adjacent Anglican parish of St Peter's, Cremorne. The school continues use of the parish church as the Secondary School chapel where school church services are regularly held.

The Roseby Building serves as the science block, originally named the Wyndham building, and was refurbished in 2007.

In 2010, the school completed the Redlands Fitness Centre. In 2010–11, a major development was undertaken on the Murdoch Street Campus as part of the Federal government BER program.

In 2016, the school commenced a 20-year, $114 million redevelopment of the Senior Campus, with the central building being a four-story tall Learning Hub.

=== Junior School ===
The Junior School campus includes the former Cremorne Girls High School site on Murdoch Street, which it purchased from the Government of New South Wales in 1989. This site houses the Preschool, Preparatory and Junior School students. Preparatory students have their classrooms in the Margaret Roberts Building, while Junior Students have classes in the Parks and Peter Cornish Buildings.Along with this, Redlands House Preschool has its own area in the southern area of the school, connected to the Robert Dunnet Hall, the sports and assembly hall. Transition Gold or Pre-Kindi is a program for kids enrolled in preschool a year young and it’s located in the Peter Cornish Building.

The 1960s three-storey building was demolished to make way for the new home for the Margaret Roberts Preparatory School (K–2) and an all purpose sports and assembly hall. A playground, oval and courts were built.

In 2024, Redlands announced a new System where the Junior School was from preschool-year 6. In 2025 when this started, Mr Micheal Quatch replaced the then head of prep school Ainslie Breckanridge and acting Junior School head, Ian Holden as their roles merged.

=== High Country Campus ===
Redlands also owns a separate campus in Jindabyne.

== Extracurricular activities ==
=== Sport ===
Redlands is a member of the Independent Schools Association (ISA), also competing against the Athletic Association of the Great Public Schools of New South Wales (AAGPS) in some sports.

The school offers both representative and non-representative sports, with students being required to compete in one representative sport a year. Summer sports include basketball, swimming, tennis, touch football, indoor hockey, rowing, and sailing. Winter sports include AFL, athletics, cross country, soccer, hockey, netball, rugby, snowsports, tennis, and water polo.

The school's rowing program is situated at Mosman Rowing Club, Pearl Bay for on water training, after an arson attack destroyed the shed at Tambourine Bay in 2007.

Each year at its High Country Campus in Jindabyne, Redlands hosts Winter School, a nine-week long residential program where students combine skiing and snowboarding with schoolwork.

== Redlands Art Prize ==
The school has hosted the Redlands Art Prize since 1996. Since 2013 (as of 2021) it has been named the Redlands Konica Minolta Art Prize and sponsored by Konica Minolta. It was formerly called the Redlands Westpac Art Prize, named after its then sponsor, Westpac.

From 2012 it has been presented at the National Art School in Darlinghurst, after 15 years of being presented by the school, and then by Mosman Gallery. The prize was worth A$25,000 in 2017. As an acquisitive prize, the substantial collection is displayed at the school. Past winners have included Imants Tillers, Pat Brassington, Callum Morton, Julie Gough, Vernon Ah Kee, Ben Quilty, Lindy Lee, Fiona Foley and Tom Polo (2014).

== Notable alumni ==
- Elizabeth Allen – poet
- Rachael Beck – musical theatre (Singin' in the Rain, The Sound of Music) and television star (Hey Dad..!, It Takes Two)
- Gergaynia Beckett – Olympic swimmer
- Charlotte Best – actress and model
- Eleanor Dark – author, Australian Literature Society Gold Medal for literature
- Amy Dickson – Grammy nominated classical saxophonist
- Sophie Falkiner – television presenter
- Nick Fisher – Olympic freestyle skier
- Karyn Gojnich – Olympic sailor
- Thistle Yolette Harris – botanist, educator, author and conservationist
- Janusz Hooker – businessman and Olympic bronze medalist
- Diana Horvath AO – doctor and medical administrator
- Anna Lunoe – DJ, vocalist, songwriter and producer
- Lachlan Mackay – rugby union player
- Helen Murrell SC – Chief Justice of the ACT Supreme Court
- Ellice Nosworthy – architect
- David Porecki – rugby union player
- Alison Rehfisch – painter
- Victoria Roberts – Olympic rower, three-time world champion
- Kathryn Robinson – journalist, television and radio presenter
- Catriona Rowntree – television presenter on Channel Nine's Getaway program
- Ruel – singer
- James Talbot – Paralympic rower
- Christian Wilkins – model and actor

== See also ==
- List of International Baccalaureate schools in Australia
- List of non-government schools in New South Wales
- 50th Redlands International Cadet Australian Championship
