= Brendan Oake =

Australian rugby league footballer

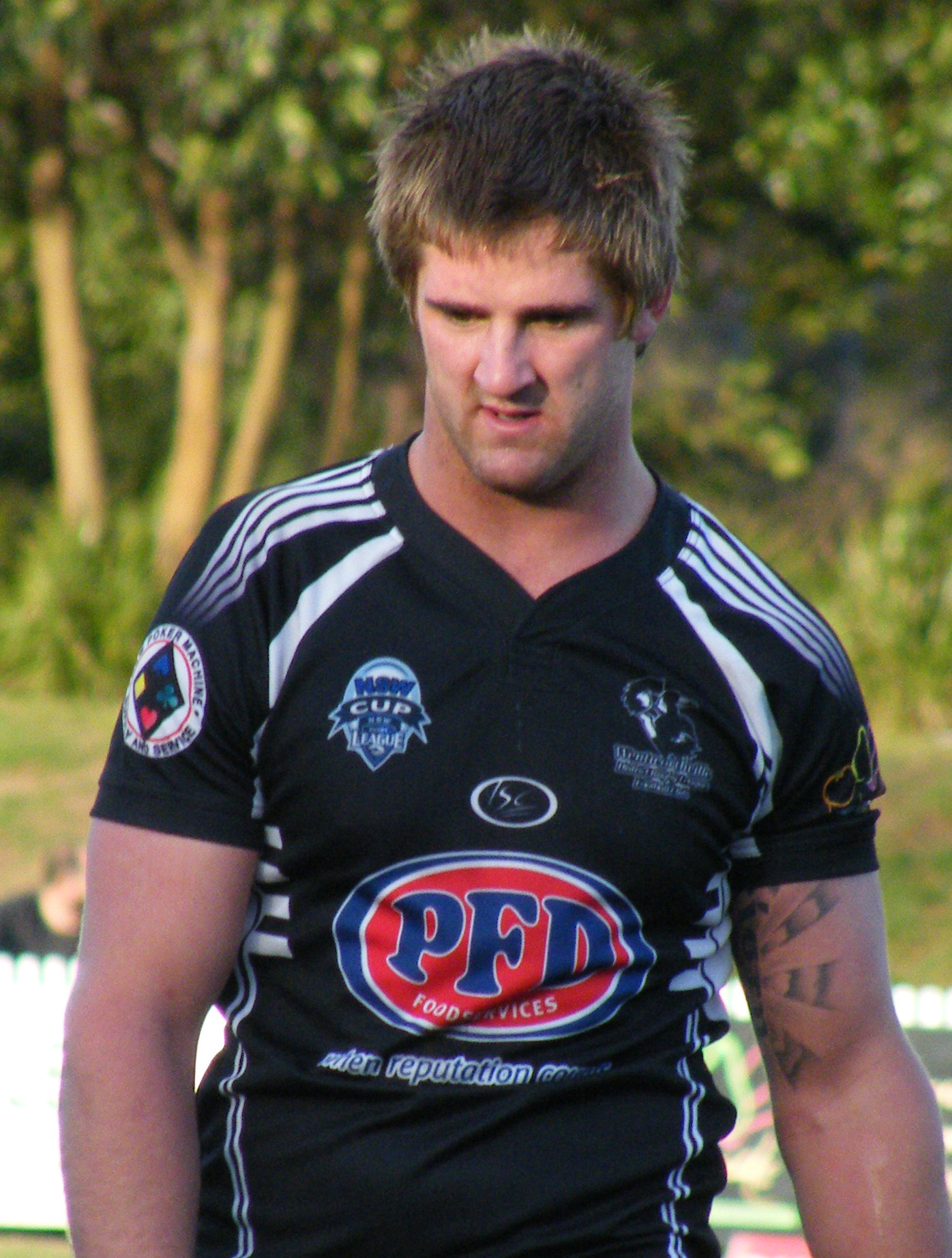

Personal information
- Full name: Brendan Oake
- Born: 17 September 1985 (age 41) Sydney, New South Wales, Australia

Playing information
- Height: 185 cm (6 ft 1 in)
- Weight: 98 kg (15 st 6 lb)
- Position: Second-row
Club
Years	Team	Pld	T	G	FG	P
2008–10	Parramatta Eels	22	0	0	0	0

Brendan Oake (born 17 September 1985) is an Australian former professional rugby league footballer played for the Parramatta Eels in the National Rugby League. He played as a second-row, prop or lock.

== Background ==
Oake was born in Sydney, New South Wales, Australia.

Brendan attended Sackville Street Primary School in Ingleburn NSW and St Gregory's College, Campbelltown.

== Playing career ==
Oake made his first grade debut for Parramatta against arch rivals Canterbury-Bankstown in round 1 of the 2008 NRL season, which ended in a 28–20 victory at Telstra Stadium. Oake made a total of 12 appearances in his debut season as the club finished a disappointing 11th on the table.

In June 2008, he resigned with the club until 2010. In 2009, Oake was limited to only four appearances and did not feature in the club's finals campaign or the 2009 NRL Grand Final. In the 2010 NRL season, Oake only made six appearances for Parramatta and was released at the end of the season after the club failed to qualify for the finals despite being selected as premiership favorites before the year began. On 8 May 2011, Oake was banned from playing for the entire 2011 NRL season after testing positive to a prohibited stimulant along with fellow Parramatta player Tom Humble. It was reported that Oake and Humble were drug-tested after playing for Wentworthville in the final round of the NSW Cup in 2010. It is alleged the players were given the substance by Wentworthville staff in the form of a supplement commercially known as Jack3d. Oake and Humble later had their bans overturned on appeal as the NSWRL found there was "no substantial fault or negligence" on the part of either player.
