= Michael MacConnell =

Australian author

Michael MacConnell is an Australian author, whose first novel, Maelstrom, was released in October 2007 by Hachette Livre. The sequel Splinter followed in July 2008. Both have been published in the United Kingdom, France, Spain, Germany, Australia and New Zealand. He is a member of the International Thriller Writers Organization. Maelstrom made the Ned Kelly Award long list in the Best Debut Novel category.

== Novels ==
- Maelstrom (2007)
- Splinter (2008)
