= Gregory Hills =

- Suburb
- Interactive map of Gregory Hills
- Country: Australia
- State: New South Wales
- City: Sydney
- LGAs: Camden Council; City of Campbelltown
- Location: 62 km (39 mi) SW of Sydney CBD

Government
  - State electorate: Camden
  - Federal division: Macarthur

Population
  - Total: 9,142 (2021 census)
- Postcode: 2557
Suburbs around Gregory Hills
Oran Park	Gledswood Hills	Eschol Park
Harrington Park	Gregory Hills	Eagle Vale
Smeaton Grange	Currans Hill	Blairmount

Gregory Hills is a suburb of Sydney in the state of New South Wales, Australia. It is located 62 kilometres south-west of the Sydney CBD, under the local government areas of mostly Camden Council and a minor easterly section in the City of Campbelltown. The suburb was assigned on 1 August 2008. The suburb was named from the topography of the local area and from the original St Gregory's Chapel on the Marist Brothers land.

== Commercial areas ==
Gregory Hills Town Centre located on 33 Village Circuit, features a Woolworths and Aldi supermarkets and over 30 specialty stores with services, groceries and restaurants. The centre is built and managed by Home Co.

Other shopping needs are met by the various shops located on the commercial strip in an area known as 'Home Centre' on Gregory Hills Drive, Gregory Hills.

The newly opened Central Hills Business Park is a 45 hectare master planned business park located in the heart of in Gregory Hills. The multi-storey business park has now evolved into a thriving commercial hub and a key source of locally based employment for the rapidly developing surrounding residential catchment.

When completed, the precinct will be the largest private employer in the Camden Local Government Area.

== Hospitals ==
The suburb has got one of the finest and modern health care facilities and is still keep growing. A few of them are:

- SOMA wellness precinct, Gregory Hills offers the full range of medical centre services
- Gregory Hills is served by another state of the art private hospital 'The George Centre' located on Gregory Hills Drive. This hospital is a private day and short stay surgical and maternity hospital providing services for adults and children.
- Our Medical Gregory Hills, located on 33 Village Cct, Gregory Hills offers healthcare services to the local community.
- Gregory Hills Private Hospital is set to be the state's largest private hospital located in Gregory Hills. The 473 bed, six storey $330 million development has officially been given planning approval from the NSW State Government and is currently undergoing.

== Education ==
Primary & secondary schools:

- Gregory Hills Public School - Public Primary School located at Long Reef Cct, Gregory Hills NSW
- St Gregory's College Campbelltown Junior School
- St Gregory's College Campbelltown
- Great Beginnings is an early childhood learning centre located on 72 Village Circuit, Gregory Hills
- Exceed Early Education and Care

== Population ==
According to the 2021 census of Population, there were 9,142 people in Gregory Hills.

- Aboriginal and Torres Strait Islander people made up 2.0% of the population.
- 65.1% of people were born in Australia. The next most common countries of birth were India 3.9% and the Philippines 2.6%.
- 59.3% of people only spoke English at home. Other languages spoken at home included Arabic 4.3%, Hindi 3.0% and Spanish 2.3%.
- The most common responses for religion were Catholic 30.7%, No Religion 21.2% and Islam 8.2%.
