= AAGPS (NSW) Athletics =

Athletics sports events in Australia

The NSW AAGPS (Athletic Association of the Great Public Schools) Athletics is one of the premier Athletics events in Australia. It is an annual event competed in between 9 member teams that include Saint Ignatius Riverview, St Joseph's Hunters Hill, Sydney Grammar, Sydney Boys High, Newington College, Scots College, The King's School, Sydney Church Of England (Shore), and The Armidale School.

The Event takes place at Sydney Olympic Park Athletic Centre and attracts crowds up to 15,000 people. It is regarded as one of the largest Athletics meets in the Southern Hemisphere

== History ==
The official athletics competition commenced in 1892. In 1912 the competition was divided into two levels – Senior and Junior. In 2012 a third level, intermediate, was added.

- Senior Championship Shield for Athletics first awarded in 1895. In 1908 a new Senior Shield replaced a previous trophy which was full having been first presented in 1873 when a race for All Schools was first held at each School carnival. The new Shield was back dated to 1895. The current holders of the AAGPS Athletics Senior Shield as of 2025 are The King's School.
- The Intermediate Championship for Athletics first awarded in 2012 to The King's School. The current holders of the Intermediate Age Group Shield as of 2025 are The King's School and St. Joseph's College.
- Junior Athletic Championship AAAGPS first awarded in 1912 and presented to Athletic Association of the Great Public Schools of NSW 11 May 1895. Engraved on the back is The Ladies Challenge Plate. The current of the Junior Age Group Shield as of 2025 are The King's School.

== Results ==
Senior Championship Shield for Athletics (1995–present)

Year	Champion
1995	SJC
1996	SJC
1997	SJC
1998	SJC/SIC
1999	SJC
2000	TKS
2001	TKS
2002	SIC
2003	SIC
2004	SIC
2005	TKS
2006	SIC
2007	SIC
2008	TKS
2009	TKS
2010	TKS
2011	TKS
2012	NC
2013	TKS
2014	SIC
2015	TKS
2016	TKS
2017	TKS
2018	TSC
2019	NC
2020	TKS
2021	n/a (covid)
2022	TKS
2023	TSC
2024	TSC
2025	TKS

== Records ==
Open Records

Open 100m: Toluta'u Koula (rugby league), Newington College 10.58 2019

Open 110m Hurdles: Nick Andrews, The King's School 14.06 2015

Open 200m: John Gikas, The King's School 21.40 2016

Open 400m: Louis Stenmark, Saint Ignatius' College 47.58 2014

Open 800m: Harry Halleen, Newington College 1:50.59 2025

Open 1500m: Jack Stapleton, The King's School 3:52.98 2013

Open 3000m: Bailey Habler, Newington College 8:29.37 2022

Open Long Jump: J.M. McCann, St Joseph's College 7.42m 1957

Open High Jump: J. Maloney/Harrison Day, St. Joseph's College 2.11m 1995/2014

Open Shot Put: Tepai Moeroa, Newington College 18.22m 2013

Senior 4x400 Relay: Sydney Grammar School 3:21.40 2004

Open 4x100 Relay: The Scots College 41.71 2024

Under-17 Records

U17 100m: Henry Hutchison, Saint Ignatius College 10.79 2014

U17 110m Hurdles: Nick Andrews, The King's School 13.45 2014

U17 200m: Nick Andrews, The King's School 21.87 2014

U17 400m: Louis Stenmark, Saint Ignatius' College 46.80 2015

U17 800m: Matthew Scott, The Scots College 1:53.26 2014

U17 1500m: Elliot Metcalf, Sydney Grammar School 3:54.03 2017

U17 Long Jump: Lachlan Westhoff, Shore 7.10m 2006

U17 High Jump: Christopher Dwyer, Saint Ignatius College 2.09m 2014

U17 Shot Put: Tepai Moeroa, Newington College 19.12m 2012

U17 4x100 Relay: Saint Joseph's College 42.53 2023

Under-16 Records

U16 100m: Louis Stenmark, Saint Ignatius' College 10.87 2014

U16 110m Hurdles: R. Hemsworth, The King's School 14.40 2019

U16 200m: Alexander Fitzpatrick, Saint Ignatius College 22.33 2014

U16 400m: M. Holmes, Saint Ignatius College 49.48 2019

U16 800m: O. Neate, Saint Joseph's College 1:55.71 2022

U16 1500m: Bailey Habler, Newington College 4:04.47 2020

U16 Long Jump: M. Hulme, St Joseph's College 6.81m 2009

U16 High Jump: J. M. Lodge, Sydney Boys High 2.00m 1997

U16 Shot Put: Tepai Moeroa, Newington College 17.61m 2011

Intermediate 4x400 Relay : Newington College 3:30.32 2011

U16 4x100 Relay: The King's School 43.49 2016

== See also ==
- Athletic Association of the Great Public Schools of New South Wales
- AAGPS (NSW) Basketball
- AAGPS (NSW) Soccer
- Head of the River (New South Wales)
