= List of Old Boys of Sydney Boys High School =

This is a List Old Boys of Sydney Boys High School, them being notable alumni – known as "Old Boys" of the academically selective Sydney Boys High School, which is located in Moore Park, New South Wales, Australia.

In 2001, The Sun-Herald ranked Sydney Boys High School fifth in Australia's top ten schools for boys, based on the number of its alumni mentioned in the Who's Who in Australia (a listing of notable Australians).

== Architecture ==
- Neville Gruzman – architect and mayor of Woollahra Council
- Andrew Andersons AO – former assistant government architect NSW, former director of PTW
- Alexander Tzannes – architect and founding director of TZANNES

== Business ==
- Tristan Antico – founder of Pioneer International
- Matt Comyn – CEO of Commonwealth Bank (2018–present)
- Henry Halloran – major property owner and developer in New South Wales in the first half of the 20th century
- René Rivkin – entrepreneur, investor, investment adviser, and stockbroker
- Nicholas Whitlam – son of Prime Minister Gough Whitlam; former chief executive of the State Bank of New South Wales

== Entertainment, media and the arts ==
- Bruce Beaver – poet
- Richard Bonynge AC CBE – conductor of the Vancouver Opera, married Dame Joan Sutherland (opera singer)
- Alex Broun – actor, director, playwright and screenwriter
- Simon Burke AO – actor
- Russell Crowe – Oscar-winning actor (2000)
- Glenn Fraser – filmmaker
- James Brunton Gibb – performer and teacher of elocution
- Rick Grossman – bass guitarist (Matt Finish, Divinyls, Hoodoo Gurus and Ghostwriters)
- Kelver Hartley – foundation professor of French at the University of Newcastle
- Ian Heads – Australian historian, commentator and author, principally of rugby league and other sports
- Richard Jasek – television director and producer (Neighbours, The Secret Life of Us, Home and Away)
- Ilan Kidron – singer, songwriter, The Potbelleez
- John Kingsmill – author and actor
- George Levendis – television and record executive; current head of international for Syco TV, a joint venture between Simon Cowell and Sony Music
- Eric McCusker – guitarist and songwriter
- Daniel MacPherson – actor (Neighbours, The Bill, City Homicide and Wild Boys) and television presenter (Dancing with the Stars and The X Factor)
- Padraic McGuinness – journalist, editor of Quadrant
- Bill Miller – film producer (Happy Feet, Mad Max trilogy, Babe)
- Dr George Miller – film director (Happy Feet, Mad Max trilogy, Babe)
- Sen Mitsuji – actor (Origin, The Man in the High Castle, Altered Carbon, Brave New World)
- John Pilger – journalist and documentary film-maker
- Plini – guitarist and songwriter
- John Prior – composer, producer, drummer (Matt Finish)
- John Stanley – radio presenter of 2UE
- Nic Testoni – actor, Home and Away
- Jack Thompson AM – actor (Wake in Fright, Sunday Too Far Away, The Man from Snowy River and Breaker Morant)
- Danny Weidler – sports journalist for the Nine Network and The Sun-Herald

== Medicine and science ==
- Prof. John Robert Anderson – chemist whose research specialised in materials science
- Dr Nikos Athanasou – professor of Musculoskeletal Pathology at Oxford University and Greek-Australian novelist
- Emeritus Professor Henry H. Bauer – professor of chemistry and science studies at Virginia Polytechnic Institute and State University ("Virginia Tech")
- Dr Ronald N. Bracewell AO – Lewis M. Terman Professor of Electrical Engineering, Emeritus of the Space, Telecommunications and Radioscience Laboratory at Stanford University
- Dr Graeme Milbourne Clark AC AO – pioneer of the multiple-channel cochlear implant; founder of the Bionic Ear Institute; Fellow of the Royal Society, Australian Father of the Year award (2004), recipient of the Centenary Medal 2003
- Dr Frank Cotton – lecturer in physiology, specialising in the study of the effects of physical strain on the human body, widely considered to be the 'father of sport science' in Australia
- Sir John Cornforth AC CBE FRS – Nobel Laureate for Chemistry (1975)
- Dr Kenneth Dawson FRSN – maxillofacial surgeon and surgical educator, the University of Washington
- Dr Hans Freeman AM FAA – bioinorganic chemist, protein crystallographer, and professor of Inorganic Chemistry
- Prof. Andrew Goodwin – gold medal, 1996 International Chemistry Olympiad, professor at Oxford University
- Sir Henry Harris – professor of medicine at the University of Oxford, pioneering work on cancer and human genetics in the 1960s
- Prof. Herbert Huppert FRS – widely published geophysicist; Professor of Theoretical Geophysics and Foundation Director, Institute of Theoretical Geophysics, Cambridge University, since 1989; fellow of King's College, Cambridge, since 1970
- Dr Kelvin Lancaster – mathematical economist and John Bates Clark professor of economics at Columbia University; developed the Theory of the Second Best with Richard Lipsey
- Sir Michael Marmot – professor of epidemiology and public health at University College London
- Lord Robert May, Baron May of Oxford OM, AC, FRS – former president of the Royal Society, Chief Scientific Adviser to the UK Government (1995–2000)
- Prof. Kenneth Minogue – political theorist and emeritus professor of Political Science and honorary fellow at the London School of Economics
- John Passmore AC – philosopher
- Dr John D. Pollard FRACP FRCP (Lund) AO – professor of Neurology at the University of Sydney, former chair of executive and head, Department of Medicine, University of Sydney
- Theodore Roughley – zoologist, author, and public servant
- Edwin Ernest Salpeter FRS – astrophysicist, Karl Schwarzschild Medalist, Bruce Medalist and Hans Bethe Prize Winner
- Sir Grafton Elliot Smith FRS FRCP – anatomist, proponent of the hyperdiffusionist view of prehistory.
- Dr Bruce William Stillman AO, FAA, FRS – biochemist and cancer researcher
- Dr Alfred van der Poorten – number theorist and former president of the Australian Mathematical Society
- Prof. Walter Lawry Waterhouse – agricultural scientist, a fellow of the Australian Academy of Science and Clark Medallist
- Prof. Walter George Woolnough – geologist and Clark Medallist
- Dr Sydney Edward Wright – academic pharmacist

== Politics, public service and the law ==
=== Politicians ===
- Peter Anderson – NSW State member for Nepean (1978–81), Penrith (1981–88), Liverpool (1989–95); New South Wales Minister for Health (1986–88)
- Sir Howard Beale KBE – federal member for Parramatta (1946–1958), Ambassador to the United States (1958–1964)
- Eric Bowden – federal member for Parramatta (1922–29)
- Fred Caterson – NSW State member for The Hills (1976–90); chief industrial officer of Qantas (1943–59)
- Morton Cohen – NSW State member for Bligh (1965–68)
- Thomas Simpson Crawford QC – NSW State member for Marrickville (1910–17); senior crown prosecutor (1940–47)
- Griffiths Evans – NSW State member for Lachlan (1938–43)
- Max Falstein – federal member for Watson (1940–49)
- Derek Freeman – member of the New South Wales Legislative Council (1973–84)
- Vernon Goodin – NSW State member for Murray (1925–27)
- Ian Glachan – NSW State member for Albury (1988–2003), served as Justice of the Peace
- Roland Green – federal member for Richmond (1922–37)
- Jon Isaacs – Northern Territory member for Millner (1977–81); 1st Opposition Leader of Northern Territory (1977–81)
- John Jobling AM – member of the New South Wales Legislative Council (1984–2003)
- Paul Landa – member of the New South Wales Legislative Council (1973–84); state member for Peats (1984); NSW Government minister (1976–83); 42nd attorney general of New South Wales (1983–84)
- John Lawson – federal member for Macquarie (1931–40)
- Ted Mack – mayor of North Sydney (1980–1988), state member for North Shore (1981–1988), federal member for North Sydney (1990–1996)
- John Mason – NSW State member for Dubbo (1965–81); 31st Leader of the Opposition in NSW (1978–81)
- John McCallum – Federal Senator for New South Wales (1950–62)
- Scott Morrison – 30th prime minister of Australia (2018–2022)
- Gary Nairn – federal member for Eden-Monaro (1996–2007)
- Garry Nehl AM – federal member for Cowper (1984–2001)
- Frank O'Neill – NSW State member for Georges River (1953–56)
- Sir Earle Page GCMG CH – 11th prime minister of Australia (1939)
- Dr Leslie Parr – NSW State member for Burwood (1951–56)
- Paul Pearce – former NSW State member for Coogee, former mayor of Waverley
- Ronald Raines – member of the New South Wales Legislative Council (1977–78)
- Luke Simpkins – Liberal federal member for Cowan (2007–2016)
- John Tingle – member of the New South Wales Legislative Council (1995–2006)
- Dr James Webb – NSW State member for Hurstville (1932–39)
- Tony Whitlam – son of Prime Minister Gough Whitlam; Federal (ALP) member for Grayndler (1975–77); justice of Federal Court of Australia (1993–2005)
- Bruce Wight – federal member for Lilley (1949–61)
- John Willcock – 15th premier of Western Australia (1936–45); WA State member for Geraldton (1917–47)

=== Public service ===
- Walter Abraham – architect and town planner, noted for designing the layout of the campus of Macquarie University as well as overseeing the first 20 years of its development
- Sir Leighton Bracegirdle KCVO CMG DSO – Australian military commander and an Official Secretary to Australian governors-general
- Sir Henry Armand Bland – Secretary of the Department of Labour and National Service (1952–1968)
- Sir John Crawford AC CBE – adviser to the World Bank, Chancellor of the Australian National University (1974–1984), Australian of the Year (1981)
- Sir Roden Cutler VC AK KCMG KCVO CBE – Australian diplomat, the longest serving and 32nd Governor of New South Wales and a recipient of the Victoria Cross
- Prof. David Flint AM – head of the Australian Broadcasting Authority (1997–2004), and legal academic
- Brian King – suffragan bishop in the Anglican Diocese of Sydney
- Sir Richard Kingsland Kt. AO CBE DFC – decorated World War II Air Force pilot
- Sir John McLaren CMG – secretary of the Prime Minister's Department (1928–1932); official secretary, High Commissioner's Office, London (1933–1936)
- Neil McInnes – Inspector General for Intelligence and Security (1986–1989)
- Sir James Plimsoll AC CBE KStJ – diplomat, Governor of Tasmania (1982–1987), Ambassador to United States (1970–1973), Union of Soviet Socialist Republics (1974–1976), Belgium, Luxembourg and the European Economic Community (1977–1979); Australian high commissioner to the United Kingdom (1980–1981)
- Leo Port MBE – 76th Lord Mayor of Sydney (1975–1978)
- Alan Renouf OBE – diplomat, high commissioner to Nigeria (1960–1963), Ambassador to Yugoslavia (1966–1969), Ambassador to France and Portugal (1969–1973), Secretary of the Department of Foreign Affairs (1974–1977), Ambassador to the United States (1978–1979).
- Sir Alan Watt – commissioner to Singapore (1954), ambassador to Japan (1956–1959) and Germany (1960–1962); Rhodes Scholar
- Peter Wilenski AC – awarded Order of Australia in 1994 for service to international relations and to public sector reform, particularly through fostering the implementation of social justice and equity principles
- Sir James Wolfensohn KBE AO – ninth president of the World Bank (1995–2005)

=== The law ===
- Hon. Bryan Beaumont AO – justice of the Federal Court of Australia (1983–2005)
- Hon. Richard Cooper – justice of the Federal Court of Australia (1992–2005)
- Hon. Marcus Einfeld – justice of the Federal Court of Australia (1986–2001) and former president of the Human Rights and Equal Opportunities Commission
- Hon. Harold Glass AO RFD – justice of Supreme Court of New South Wales (1974–77), justice of the New South Wales Court of Appeal (1977–87) and Judge Advocate General for the Royal Australian Navy (1978–83)
- Sir Frederick Richard Jordan KCMG – 9th chief justice of the Supreme Court of New South Wales (1934–1949)
- Hon. Peter Hely – justice of the Federal Court of Australia (1998–2005)
- Hon. Peter Jacobson – current justice of the Federal Court of Australia (2002–present)
- Hon. Rodney Madgwick – justice of the Federal Court of Australia (1995–2008)
- Hon. Lionel Murphy – justice of the High Court of Australia (1975–86), 22nd attorney-general of Australia (1972–75), federal senator (1961–72)
- Hon. Nye Perram – current justice of the Federal Court of Australia (2008–present)
- Hon. Philip Powell AM QC (judge) – New South Wales Court of Appeal judge (1993–2002)
- Hon. John Sackar QC (judge) – Supreme Court of New South Wales judge (2011–present)
- Hon. Jim Spigelman AC QC – 16th chief justice of the Supreme Court of New South Wales (1998–2011)
- Hon. Paul Stein AM QC (judge) – New South Wales Court of Appeal judge (1997–2003)
- Hon. Donald Stewart – Supreme Court of New South Wales judge (1981–84), Royal Commissioner on Inquiry into Drug Trafficking
- Sir Bernard Sugerman – President of New South Wales Court of Appeal (1970–1972), Acting Chief justice of New South Wales (1971–1972)
- Sir Gordon Wallace – Supreme Court of New South Wales judge (1960–1970), president of New South Wales Court of Appeal (1966–1970), acting chief justice of New South Wales (1968–1969)
- Hon. John Halden "Hal" Wootten AC – justice of Supreme Court of New South Wales (1973–83), awarded Order of Australia in 1990 for service to human rights, to conservation, to legal education and to the law

== Rhodes Scholars ==
- 1913 – Ethelbert Ambrook Southee
- 1918 – Raymond Newton Kershaw
- 1919 – Arthur Wesley Wheen – BA University of Sydney (completed University of Oxford)
- 1921 – Alan Watt – BA University of Sydney
- 1929 – Ian Matheson Edwards
- 1955 – Alan David Ker Stout
- 1957 – John Maxwell Bailey
- 1966 – Ian William Dawes
- 1968 – David Atherton Griffiths
- 1998 – Anthony David Ross Abrahams

== Sport ==
=== Rugby union ===
- Frank Row – rugby union player (first test captain, 3 tests, 1899)
- Stan Wickham – rugby union player (5 tests for the Wallabies, 1903–1905)
- Tom Pauling – rugby union player (2 tests for the Wallabies, 1936–1937)
- Gordon Stone – rugby union player (1 test for the Wallabies, 1938)
- Mick Cremin – rugby union player (19 tests for the Wallabies, 1946–1948)
- John Thornett – rugby union player (37 tests for the Wallabies, 1955–1967, 49th captain)
- John Bosler – rugby union player (1 tests for the Wallabies, 1956)
- Saxon White – rugby union player (7 tests for the Wallabies, 1956–1958)
- John Brass – dual rugby-code international (12 tests for the Wallabies (1966–1968), 6 tests for the Kangaroos (1970–1975) & Kangaroo captain (1975))
- Alan Skinner – rugby union player (3 tests for the Wallabies, 1969–1970)
- Chris Whitaker – rugby union player (Waratahs, Wallabies (31 tests, 1998–2005) & Wallabies captain (2003))
- Jason Jones-Hughes – rugby union player (Randwick, Waratahs, Newport, 3 tests for Wales)
- Marc Stcherbina – rugby union player (Waratahs, Australian Rugby Sevens, Northampton, Cardiff)
- Duncan McRae – rugby union player – Waratahs (1999–2000 & 2001–2003), and rugby league player (South Sydney (1993–95), Canterbury (1997–1998))
- Bob Dwyer – 1991 World Cup-winning Australia rugby union coach, coach of Wallabies (1982–83 and 1988–91), coach of Waratahs (2001–03)
- Alan Gaffney – former assistant and backs coach (Wallabies)

=== Rugby league ===
- Viv Thicknesse – rugby league player (Eastern Suburbs, New South Wales and 7 tests for Australia (1933–36))
- Ross McKinnon – rugby league player (Eastern Suburbs, New South Wales and 8 tests for Australia (1935–38)) and rugby league coach (North Sydney and Canterbury-Bankstown). Great-grandfather of Wade McKinnon
- Bruce Hopkins – rugby league player (Canterbury-Bankstown, Balmain, St. George Dragons, New South Wales and Australia (1948 Kangaroo Tour))
- George Evans – rugby league player (St. George Dragons (1962–1968)), Premiership-winning halfback (1962, 1963, 1964, 1965) and rugby union player (New South Wales (1960), Wallabies (1960))
- George Taylforth – rugby league player (Canterbury Bulldogs (1965–1969), Cronulla Sharks (1970–1972), New South Wales (1967))
  - Craig Wing – rugby league player (South Sydney Rabbitohs (1998–1999 and 2008–2009), Sydney Roosters (2000–2007), City Origin (2001–09), NSW Blues (2003–2009), Australia (16 tests, 2002–2005)) and rugby union player (NTT Communications Shining Arcs (2010–present))
- Colin Love AM – current chairman of the New South Wales Rugby League and Australian Rugby League (1999–present); former chairman of Rugby League International Federation

=== Cricket ===
- Sam Robson – current England test cricketer and player for Middlesex County Cricket Club, Australian Under-19 representative (7 tests for England, 2014–present)
- Sammy Carter – cricket player (28 tests for Australia, 1907–21)
- Syd Gregory – cricket player (58 tests for Australia, 1890–1912)
- Dick French – Australian Test cricket umpire (19 tests, 1977–87)

=== Track and field ===
- Stan Rowley – athlete, Olympic gold medalist at 1900 Summer Olympics 5000 metres team race
- Jack Metcalfe – athlete, Olympic medalist at 1936 Summer Olympics and twice Commonwealth Games champion in Triple Jump
- Basil Dickinson – athlete, twice medalist at 1938 Empire Games in Triple Jump and Long Jump, Olympian (1936 Summer Olympics)
- Peter Denton – athlete, Olympic pole vaulter at 1956 Summer Olympics

=== Aquatic ===
- Ernest Henry – swimmer, Olympic medalist at 1924 Summer Olympics in 4 × 200 m relay
- Graeme Brewer – swimmer, Olympic medalist at 1980 Summer Olympics in 200m freestyle

=== Tennis ===
- Vivian McGrath – tennis player, Australian Open Singles Champion (1937) and Doubles Champion (1935)
- Jamie Morgan – tennis player (Davis Cup)

=== Football ===
- Daniel Arzani – football player, Australia (5 caps / 1 goal, 2018–present) and Melbourne City FC

=== Rowing ===
- Mervyn Wood MBE, LVO, QPM – rower, Olympic gold medalist at 1948 Summer Olympics in single sculls, silver and bronze medalist at 1952 Summer Olympics in single sculls and 1956 Summer Olympics in double sculls; NSW Commissioner of Police (1977–79)
- Edward Pain – rower, Olympic medalist at 1952 Summer Olympics in the eights
- Nimrod Greenwood – rower, Olympic medalist at 1952 Summer Olympics in the eights
- David Anderson – rower, Olympic medalist at 1952 Summer Olympics in the eights gold medalist at 1954 Commonwealth Games in coxed fours, bronze medalist in uncoxed pairs
- Alan Grover – rower, medalist at 1968 Summer Olympics in the eights
- Dominic Grimm – rower, World Champion in coxed pair in 2010

=== Other ===
- Sir Tristan Antico AC – founder of Pioneer Concrete; champion horse breeder
- Sir Arthur George AO – president of the Australian Soccer Federation (1969–1988); FIFA Executive Committee (1980)
- Archbishop Justin Daniel Simonds – Catholic archbishop of Melbourne

== See also ==
- List of government schools in New South Wales
- List of selective high schools in New South Wales
- Athletic Association of the Great Public Schools of New South Wales
