= AAGPS (NSW) Rugby =

Annual rugby union competition in Australia

This is an annual rugby union competition played by teams from Sydney, Australia based boys high schools who are members of the AAGPS.

== History ==
The official GPS rugby union competition commenced in 1892. St Joseph's College joined the competition in 1895 and Saint Ignatius' College in 1907.The competition's annual match between Newington College and The King's School is the oldest rivalry game in rugby union in Australia, dating back to at least 1870. In 1874 both Newington College and The King's School were founding members of the Southern Rugby Football Union (now the NSWRU).

In 2009, after 103 years playing in the 1st XV competition, Sydney Boys High School withdrew itself from AAGPS Rugby. After a two-year absence they returned in 2011, with their 1st XV competing in the 2nd XV competition. In 2012 the Armidale School's 1st XV was admitted into the 2nd XV competition while High were placed in the inaugural 3rd XV competition. Sydney Grammar School decided not to participate in the 2013 1st XV competition reducing the number of schools competing in the 1st XV to six.

The current format across the 1st XV and 2nd XV competitions include Newington College, Shore School, St Ignatius' College, St Joseph's College, The King's School and The Scots College. The 3rd XVs of all these schools joined the 1st XVs of Armidale, Grammar and High in a nine-team 3rd XV competition. With the 1st XV and 2nd XV only having six teams, the current competition format follows a double round-robin format with 10 rounds.

- 1st Grade School Challenge Trophy Presented by the President and Vice Presidents of The New South Wales Rugby Football Union first award in 1986 replacing an earlier shield.
- 2nd Grade W.S.Corr Shield. The Shield also has AAGPS 2nd Grade Football engraved on it. It was first presented in 1913.

== Results ==
=== 1892 to 1999 ===
Results
Year	1st XV	2nd XV
1892	King's	-
1893	King's	-
1894	King's	-
1895	King's	-
1896	Newington	-
1897	Grammar	-
1898	Grammar	-
1899	Grammar	-
1900	Newington	-
1901	King's	-
1902	King's	-
1903	King's	-
1904	St Joseph's	Scots
1905	St Joseph's	St Joseph's
1906	St Joseph's	-
1907	St Joseph's	-
1908	Shore	-
1909	Shore	-
1910	King's	-
1911	Newington	Scots
1912	Newington	King's
1913	King's	Shore
1914	King's	King's
1915	Grammar	St Joseph's
1916	Grammar	St Joseph's
1917	King's	King's
1918	St Joseph's	St Joseph's
1919	Grammar	Grammar
1920	Grammar	Grammar
1921	Grammar	Shore, St Joseph's
1922	Grammar	Grammar
1923	St Joseph's	Shore
1924	Grammar, St Joseph's, King's	King's
1925	St Joseph's	King's
1926	King's	St Joseph's
1927	St Joseph's, King's	King's
1928	King's	Shore
1929	Grammar	Shore
1930	St Joseph's	Shore
1931	St Joseph's	St Joseph's
1932	St Joseph's	St Joseph's
1933	Shore, St Joseph's	Shore, Grammar, St Joseph's
1934	King's	St Joseph's
1935	St Joseph's	St Joseph's
1936	St Joseph's	St Joseph's
1937	St Joseph's	St Joseph's
1938	St Joseph's	Grammar, St Joseph's
1939	St Joseph's	St Joseph's
1940-5	No Competitions	
1946	High, St Joseph's	St Joseph's
1947	St Joseph's	Shore, High
1948	St Joseph's, Scots	Shore
1949	Grammar, Scots	Shore
1950	St Joseph's	Shore
1951	King's	Shore, St Joseph's
1952	St Joseph's	St Joseph's
1953	Newington	King's, St Joseph's
1954	King's	Shore
1955	St Joseph's	St Joseph's
1956	St Joseph's	St Joseph's
1957	St Joseph's	St Joseph's
1958	St Joseph's	Scots
1959	Scots	Grammar, St Joseph's
1960	St Joseph's	St Joseph's
1961	Newington, King's	St Ignatius'
1962	St Joseph's	Grammar
1963	High	Newington
1964	St Ignatius'	Newington
1965	St Joseph's	Shore, High
1966	Grammar	Newington
1967	Grammar	St Joseph's
1968	St Joseph's	Shore
1969	Shore	St Joseph's
1970	Shore, St Joseph's	Grammar
1971	High	Shore
1972	High, St Ignatius'	St Joseph's
1973	High	King's
1974	King's	St Joseph's
1975	St Ignatius'	St Joseph's
1976	St Joseph's	Scots
1977	Shore, St Joseph's	St Joseph's
1978	Scots, St Joseph's, King's	Shore
1979	Newington	Scots
1980	St Ignatius'	St Ignatius', St Joseph's
1981	St Joseph's	St Joseph's
1982	St Joseph's	St Joseph's, Shore
1983	St Joseph's	Shore
1984	St Joseph's	St Ignatius', Shore
1985	St Joseph's, Shore	St Joseph's
1986	St Joseph's	St Joseph's
1987	Scots	Newington, St Joseph's
1988	St Joseph's	Shore
1989	St Joseph's	Shore
1990	St Joseph's	St Joseph's
1991	St Joseph's	St Ignatius'
1992	St Joseph's	Newington, St Joseph's
1993	Scots	Newington, St Joseph's
1994	St Joseph's	St Joseph's
1995	St Joseph's	St Joseph's
1996	Saint Ignatius' College	St Joseph's
1997	St Joseph's	King's, Shore, St Joseph's
1998	St Joseph's, Shore, St Joseph's	St Joseph's
1999	St Joseph's	St Joseph's

=== Year 2000 onwards ===
Results
Year	1st XV	2nd XV	3rd XV
2000	King's	King's	
2001	St Joseph's	King's	
2002	King's	St Ignatius'	
2003	St Ignatius'	St Joseph's	
2004	St Joseph's	St Joseph's	
2005	St Joseph's	St Joseph's	
2006	St Joseph's, St Ignatius', Shore	St Ignatius', Shore	
2007	St Joseph's	St Joseph's	
2008	St Ignatius', King's	St Ignatius'	
2009	St Ignatius', King's	King's	
2010	Newington	St Joseph's	
2011	St Ignatius'	St Ignatius'	
2012	Newington	St Joseph's	St Joseph's
2013	Newington, Scots	St Joseph's	Armidale
2014	Scots	King's	Scots, Grammar, Armidale
2015	Newington, Scots	St Joseph's	St Joseph's
2016	Scots	Scots	Armidale
2017	Scots	Scots	St Joseph's
2018	King's, St Joseph's	St Joseph's	St Ignatius'
2019	St Joseph's	St Joseph's	St Joseph's
2020	King's	St Joseph's	Grammar
2021	Not completed		
2022	St Joseph's	Scots	King's, St Ignatius'
2023	King's	St Joseph's	The Scots College
2024	Shore	The Scots College	Shore
2025	St Ignatius'	St Joseph's	St Joseph's
2026	Newington, St Ignatius'	St Ignatius', St Joseph's	Armidale

== See also ==
- Athletic Association of the Great Public Schools of New South Wales
- AAGPS (NSW) Basketball
- AAGPS (NSW) Soccer
- Head of the River (New South Wales)
- AAGPS (NSW) Athletics
