= AAGPS (NSW) Basketball =

School basketball competition in Australia

AAGPS Basketball
- Athletic Association of the Great Public Schools of New South Wales Basketball
- Formation: 1975
- Headquarters: Sydney, NSW, Australia
- Members: The King's School; Sydney Grammar School; Newington College; Saint Ignatius' College; St Joseph's College; Sydney Boys High School; Sydney Church of England Grammar School; The Scots College
- Website: http://aagps.nsw.edu.au/summer-sports/basketball

The NSW AAGPS (Athletic Association of the Great Public Schools of New South Wales) is a school basketball competition played in Australia. It is an annual, 14 round competition played between 8 Sydney member teams that include Saint Ignatius Riverview, St Joseph's Hunters Hill, Sydney Grammar, Sydney Boys High, Newington College, Scots College, The Kings school and Sydney Church Of England Grammar School (Shore). Preseason games are played in Term 3-4 school holidays in the Knox Invitational tournament and Raschke Cup as well as the Trinity Challenge in Summer, with the official GPS games played in Term 4 and 1 on Saturday. 1st grade games commence at 11:45 and often attract large crowds, whilst second grade games commence at 10:00. The 1st grade premiership is currently held by Newington College while the Rashcke cup is held by Newington College. In 2nd grade the premiership is held by St Ignatius College, Riverview and The Scots College while the PJ Yeend Trophy is currently held by Saint Ignatius’ College, Riverview.

Every season the AAGPS/RASCHKE Cup (all AAGPS schools compete) is played (formerly in a one-week before Round 1, in a 2-day round robin formatted competition) over the trial rounds, with the schools being separated into two pools, with the winner of each group playing each other in the final. This cup is the 2nd most prestigious accolade from a season. In near consecutive seasons of 2013, 2014, 2015, 2017, 2018 Saint Ignatius College Riverview have made the final, in which they have been victorious 4 times (13, 15, 17, 18). In the 2024 AAGPS basketball season, The Scots College 1sts team won the Raschke Cup, defeating The King's School with a final score of 89-55 in October 2024.

== Commencement ==
The competition commenced in 1975.

- First Teams compete for the Denys Hake Shield which was first awarded in 1975, and was presented by The King's School Council in honour of the wife of a former Headmaster of King's, Herbert Denys Hake OBE.
- Second Teams compete for The TE Bawden Shield which was first awarded in 1975. It was also presented by The King's School and named after the first GPS Convenor of Basketball, and later GPS Treasurer, Tom Bawden.
- The AAGPS and CAS First Teams compete annually for the PJ Yeend Cup, presented by Basketball NSW.
- The AAGPS and ISA First Teams compete annually for the McKay Cup.

== Competition format ==
Seasons are a 14-round competition where each team plays each other twice, in 2013 the competition games were halved to 7 rounds with each team playing each other once, though the competition has since reverted a 14-round season. The season begins in Term 4, where teams will play trial matches against a mix of AAGPS, ISA, and CAS teams, including 3 rounds of Raschke Cup/Yeend Shield, where a pre-season winner will be crowned.

Term 1 begins the competition games where schools play each other every Saturday, 10am for 2nd V and 11:45am for 1st V. If a team is able to win 7 games they will be crowned Undefeated Champions and earn the outright AAGPS title.

== Results ==
=== 1975 to 1999 ===
Results
Year	1st Grade	2nd Grade
1975	King's	King's
1976	King's	King's,St Joseph's
1977	Shore	King's
1978	St Ignatius',Shore	King's
1979	Shore	St Joseph's
1980	King's	King's
1981	King's,St Joseph's	King's
1982	King's	King's
1983	King's	King's,High
1984	St Joseph's	St Joseph's
1985	Scots	Newington,King's
1986	Scots	St Joseph's
1987	Shore	St Joseph's
1988	Grammar	St Joseph's
1989	St Joseph's	Newington, St Joseph's
1990	Newington	St Joseph's
1991	St Joseph's	Newington, St Joseph's
1992	Newington	Newington
1993	St Joseph's	St Joseph's,Grammar
1994	High	St Ignatius'
1995	Newington	St Joseph's
1996	Newington	St Ignatius',Grammar,St Joseph's
1997	Newington	St Joseph's
1998	Newington	St Joseph's
1999	Scots	Scots

=== 2000 onwards ===
Results
Year	1st Grade	2nd Grade
2000	Scots*	Scots
2001	Scots*	Shore
2002	Shore*	Shore*
2003	Shore*	Shore
2004	Scots*	Grammar/St. Ignatius'
2005	Newington*	Newington
2006	Kings	Shore
2007	Shore	St. Ignatius'
2008	Newington	St. Ignatius'
2009	Newington*	St. Ignatius'
2010	Newington	Newington*
2011	Newington, High, Scots	Newington*
2012	High, Scots	Scots*
2013	Scots*	High*
2014	High*	St Josephs, St Ignatius' *
2015	Newington/High	Scots/High
2016	Newington College	Newington College/Scots
2017	Newington College	Saint Ignatius College, Riverview (Undefeated)
2018	Newington College*	Saint Ignatius College, Riverview*
2019	Saint Ignatius College, Riverview* (AAGPS and NSWCIS CHAMPIONS)	Saint Ignatius College, Riverview*
2020	Scots	Shore/Newington College
2021	Shore* (undefeated AAGPS AND NSWCIS CHAMPIONS)	St Ignatius College, Riverview
2022	Newington	Newington
2023	Newington	Newington
2024	Newington	St Ignatius College, Riverview/ Scots
2025	Kings	Newington

* Champions (undefeated)

== Notable players ==
- Isaac Humphries (Scots) – University of Kentucky/Orlando Magic
- Nick Kay (Newington) – Metro State College/Perth Wildcats
- Craig Moller - (High) - South East Melbourne Phoenix
- Jordan Hunter (Riverview) – St Mary's College/Sydney Kings
- Jackson Aldridge (Riverview) – Butler University
- Makuach Maluach (Newington) – University of New Mexico/Sydney Kings
- Josh Green (Kings) – University of Arizona/ Dallas Mavericks
- Grant Anticevich (Newington) – University of California
- Hunter Madden (Shore) – Albeine Christian University/Sydney Kings
- James O’Donnell (Shore) – University of San Francisco/NBA Global Academy
- Henry Lau (High) – University of Pittsburgh/Sydney Kings

== See also ==
- Athletic Association of the Great Public Schools of New South Wales
- AAGPS (NSW) Rugby
- AAGPS (NSW) Soccer
- Head of the River (New South Wales)
