= Bob Outterside =

- Born: Robert Outterside; 6 March 1932 Sydney, Australia
- Died: 8 August 2022 (aged 90)

Rugby union career
- Position: Number 8
International career
Years	Team	Apps	(Points)
1959	Wallabies	2	(0)

Robert Outterside AO (6 March 1932 – 8 August 2022) was an Australian rugby union player.

Outterside, a number 8, was born in Sydney and played two international rugby matches for Australia.

Away from football, Outterside was also a successful teacher and school administrator, rising to become Headmaster of Sydney Boys High School. In 1990, he was appointed an Officer of the Order of Australia (AO) for service to education.

Outterside died on 8 August 2022, at the age of 90.
