= Tristan Antico =

Australian industrialist (1923 – 2004)

Sir Tristan Antico AC
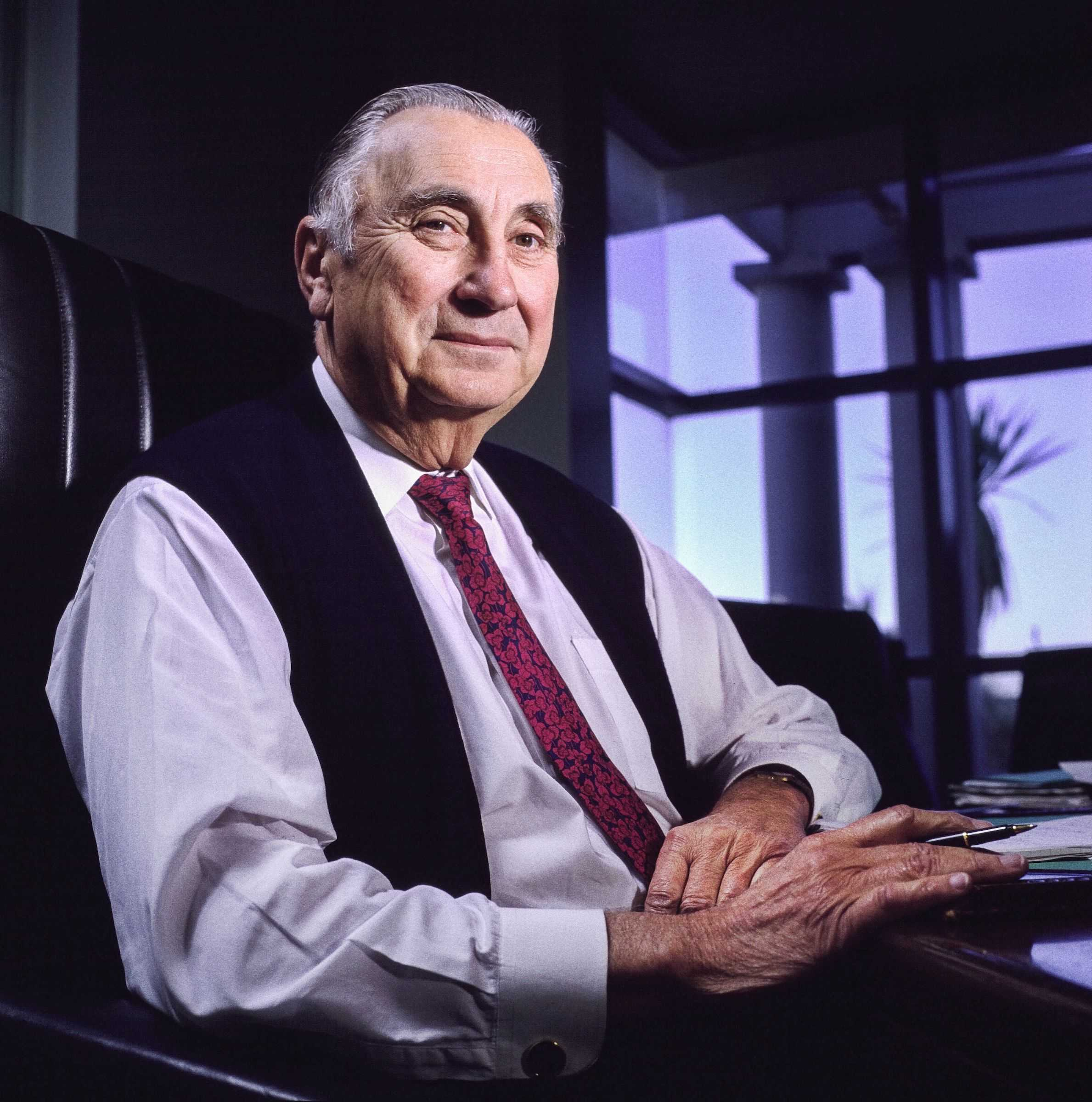
- Tristan Antico
- Born: Tristan Venus Antico; 25 March 1923; Piovene, Italy
- Died: 26 December 2004 (aged 81)
- Education: Sydney Boys High School
- Occupations: Industrialist, horse breeder, philanthropist
- Known for: Founder of Pioneer Concrete (Pioneer International)

Sir Tristan Venus Antico, AC (25 March 1923 – 26 December 2004), was a prominent Australian industrialist, horse breeder, and patron of the arts.

Antico was born in Piovene, Italy, immigrating with his family to Australia aged seven. He attended Sydney Boys High School.

In 1954 Antico bought Pioneer Readymix. In 1959 it was listed on the Sydney Stock Market. In 1967 Italy made Antico a Commander of the Order of the Star of Italian Solidarity. He was knighted in 1973 and was appointed a Companion of the Order of Australia in 1983.

He was chairman of St Vincent's Hospital.
