= St Joseph's College, Hunters Hill =

St Joseph's College
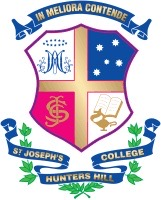

Location
- Mark Street; Hunters Hill; Hunters Hill, Lower North Shore, Sydney, New South Wales, 2110; Australia; 33°49′54″S 151°8′20″E

Information
- Other name: Joeys
- School type: Independent secondary day and boarding school Boarding and Day Private school
- Motto: Latin: In Meliora Contende (Strive for Better Things)
- Religious affiliations: Marist Brothers; Association of Marist Schools of Australia
- Denomination: Roman Catholicism
- Patron saint: St Joseph of Nazareth
- Established: 1881; 145 years ago
- Founder: Br Emilian Pontet
- Status: Open
- Sister school: Marist Sisters' College, Woolwich
- Educational authority: New South Wales Education Standards Authority
- Headmaster: Michael Blake
- Chaplain: Fr Gavin Foster SM
- Staff: ≈200
- Gender: Boys
- Age range: 12–18
- Enrolment: c. 1,100 (2024)
- Average class size: 25
- Education system: Private Independent
- Language: English
- Hours in school day: 9 (Day students arrive at 8, able to leave at 5)
- Campuses: 2 (Main Hunters Hill campus and Colo Outdoor Education Centre)
- Campus size: 4.45 hectares (11.0 acres)
- Campus type: Suburban
- Houses: Colour Houses
- Colours: Cerise and blue
- Song: Sub Tuum
- Nickname: Joeys; SJC
- Rival: St Ignatius, SHORE
- Newspaper: Cerise and Blue (Old Boys Publication), Joeys Magazine (School Magazine)
- Affiliations: Association of Heads of Independent Schools of Australia; Australian Boarding Schools' Association; Athletic Association of the Great Public Schools of New South Wales
- Alumni: St. Joseph's Old Boys
- Alumni name: Old Boys
- Website: www.joeys.org

St Joseph's College (abbreviated as SJC and commonly called Joeys) is an independent Catholic secondary day and boarding school for boys, conducted in the Marist Brothers tradition, in Hunters Hill, a suburb on the Lower North Shore of Sydney, New South Wales, Australia.

Founded by the Marist Brothers in 1881, Joeys has approximately 1,100 students from Year 7 to Year 12, including over 550 boarders, making it the largest all boys' boarding school in Australia, and one of the largest in the Southern Hemisphere.

The College is affiliated with the Association of Heads of Independent Schools of Australia (AHISA), the Australian Boarding Schools' Association (ABSA), the Association of Marist Schools of Australia (AMSA), and is a founding member of the Athletic Association of the Great Public Schools of New South Wales (AAGPS).

== History ==
=== Foundation ===
St Joseph's College (SJC) can trace its origins back to the Marist Brothers' school founded in Harrington Street, Church Hill, which was attached to St Patrick's Catholic Church. The headmaster Emilian Pontet then sought out land to found a new school elsewhere. The aim was to create a school with a French Catholic ethos. After inspecting several locations, Hunters Hill was chosen due to its proximity to the Marist Fathers' Monastery and Parish of Villa Maria.

On 29 July 1881, the headmaster, Emilian Pontet, moved the schools location from Harrington Street to Hunters Hill, founding St Joseph's College in a temporary wooden building with a student population of 55. In 1887, James Francis Hogan wrote in The Irish in Australia that:

St John's College, affiliated to the University of Sydney; Saint Ignatius' College, Riverview, conducted by the Jesuit Fathers; and St. Joseph's College, Hunter Hill [sic], under the management of , are three educational institutions that reflect the highest credit on the Catholic population of the parent colony.

Brother Emilian Pontet was the founding headmaster (1881–1890); he was succeeded by Brother Stanislaus (1890–1894) who continued the building program at the main campus and oversaw the acquisition of 16 acres of playing fields close by.

=== Headmasters ===
Ordinal	Officeholder	Term start	Term end	Time in office	Notes
1	Brother Emilian Pontet	1881	1890	8–9 years	
2	Br Stanislaus Healy	1890	1894	3–4 years	
3	Br Basil (Kelly)	1895	1897	1–2 years	
4	Br Denis (Reilly)	1897	1902	4–5 years	
5	Br Clement (Murray)	1902	1909	6–7 years	
6	Br Victor (Ludeke)	1909	1912	2–3 years	
7	Br Borgia (Coughlan)	1913	1917	3–4 years	
8	Br Osmund (Rice)	1918	1920	1–2 years	
9	Br George (O'Meara)	1921	1923	1–2 years	
10	Br Brendan (Hill)	1924	1925	0–1 years	
11	Br Gerard (O'Donoghue)	1925	1927	1–2 years	
12	Br Clement (Murray)	1928	1928	0 years	
13	Br Denis	1928	1932	3–4 years	
14	Br Placid (Gilchrist)	1932	1934	1–2 years	
15	Br Louis (Hughes)	1935	1940	4–5 years	
16	Br Gerard (O'Donoghue)	1941	1941	0 years	
17	Br Angelus (McKinley)	1942	1947	4–5 years	
18	Br Louis (Hughes)	1948	1950	1–2 years	
19	Br Quentin (Duffy)	1951	1954	2–3 years	
20	Br Othmar Weldon	1955	1961	5–6 years	
21	Br Elias	1962	1967	4–5 years	
22	Br Gildas (born Robert Goodwin)	1968	1970	1–2 years	
23	Br Alman Dwyer	1971	1976	4–5 years	
24	Br Geoffrey Joy	1977	1982	4–5 years	
25	Br Joseph McMahon	1983	1991	7–8 years	
26	Br Ernest Houston	1992	2000	7–8 years	
27	Br Paul Hough	2001	2006	4–5 years	
28	Ross Tarlinton	2006	2017	10–11 years	
29	Christopher Hayes	2018	2020	1–2 years	
30	Michael Blake	2021			

=== Campus ===
The College opened in 1881 in a temporary wooden building, however, it has continued to expand its grounds and buildings since then. Some examples are the construction of the main building's southern wing in 1882–1884; the building of the central and northern wing in 1889–1894 and the building of the Chapel in 1938–1940. The south-eastern corner of the College campus is a property which was acquired in 1882 with the assistance of a benefactor named O'Shaugnessy. The property was then known as Joubert's Reserve and the original small stone cottage that stood on the land when it was acquired still remains on the site today. The College's main playing fields ("the Park") are located 300m away from the main campus and were bought in 1893 from Charles Gilbert Heydon a distinguished lawyer and devout Catholic who offered the Brothers for sale at a discount 16 acres he had acquired nine years earlier. Heydon agreed to a generous instalment plan to assist the Brothers to make the purchase and the interest bill was met by the same benefactor O'Shaugnessy who had assisted with the acquisition of Joubert's Reserve eleven years earlier. Charles Gilbert Heydon was the brother of Louis Francis Heydon MLC, for a time the Australasian President of the St Vincent de Paul Society. Louis died on 17 May 1918 at his residence "Kentigern" at Mary Street Hunters Hill with a requiem mass at Villa Maria followed by a burial at the Field of Mars Cemetery. The Society report for the completed 1907 year refers to 10 new conferences in NSW, one being at St Joseph's College Hunters Hill – being the "first collegiate conference in the circumscription".

Today the College is situated on a 16-hectare (40-acre) campus overlooking the Lane Cove and Parramatta Rivers, in suburban Hunter's Hill, 6 kilometres (3.7 mi) from the Sydney central business district. The current facilities of the school include:

=== Sporting facilities ===
Similar to other GPS schools, St Joseph's has significant sporting facilities for use in both training and competition. The College owns and maintains approximately 10 playing fields for cricket, rugby and football. The main playing fields are housed in a 10-hectare (25-acre) facility known as "the Park" and located two blocks from the school campus and is often used by higher level teams for training purposes. The Park complex also contains 8 tennis courts. It is considered the best school in the GPS currently as it has the most wins.

On the main school campus there are five basketball courts, three playing fields (referred to as the 'back ovals'), a number of cricket nets, a swimming pool, two gymnasiums (for basketball and weightlifting respectively) and a cardio room. The boatshed and pontoons for the school's rowing club are situated some 300 metres (980 ft) from the main campus on nearby Tarban Creek, a northern tributary of Sydney's Parramatta River.

=== Outdoor education facilities ===
In 1986, St Joseph's opened "Colo", an outdoor education centre for students. It provides education in various outdoor activities, culminating in extended expeditions in Year 9.

Collectable School Cigarette card featuring the Joeys colours & crest, c. 1910s

== Organisation ==
=== Marist Brothers ===
An ageing population of Marist brothers have their own accommodation on the school grounds (some in the retired brothers quarters) and work to maintain its status, holding a number of executive positions at the College. In 2006, Ross Tarlinton became the first lay headmaster of the College, followed by Dr Chris Hayes in 2017.

In 2019, the College farewelled the last teaching Marist Brother, Br Anthony Boyd (1969), who after 40 years of service at the College (23 as deputy headmaster), retired from his duties at the College.

=== Sexual abuse allegations ===
In June, July and August 2014 the Royal Commission into Institutional Responses to Child Sexual Abuse, a royal commission of inquiry initiated in 2013 by the Australian Government and supported by all of its state governments, began an investigation into the response of Marist Brothers to allegations of child sexual abuse in schools in the ACT, NSW and Queensland. Five former students, one former teacher, a former assistant principal and two former principals, former and current Marist officials and clergy, and one of the clergy at the centre of the allegations gave evidence or made statements before the Royal Commission that the alleged cases of abuse happened during the 1970s and 1980s at Daramalan College, Canberra, at Lismore, Campbelltown and in Far North Queensland.

In March 2015 a former Marist brother, Francis William Cable, known as Brother Romuald was arrested over a number of sex offences allegedly committed at St Joseph's College and St Gregory's College in Campbelltown in the 1980s.

In 2021, a Marist Brother who worked at the school in the 1970's was convicted of a number of child sexual abuses which occurred at the school. On 5 November 2021, O’Brien was given a head sentence of 7 years 9 months, 5 years non parole and is available for parole on 14 April 2026.

=== Boarding ===
With a boarding population of approximately 900, SJC is the largest boarding school for boys in Australia. Joeys offers full boarding as well as weekly boarding options (where students go home on weekends). In recent times, the College has also offered day-schooling, and students who do not board are known as 'day-boys'. Day students and Boarders are not segregated and have smaller cabinets ('presses') and are usually in the same area as boarders.

A number of dormitories ('dorms') and refectories ('refs') are located on the College grounds for boarders and day-boys alike. Dorms and refs are segregated by year, and students tend to receive larger, more private and more privileged accommodation as they advance through the years(i.e. students move from large dormitories to single rooms, and from the College's original accommodation facilities to newly built accommodation). Year 7, 8 and 9 dormitories are situated on the 4th and 3rd floors in the main building, with year 7 and 8 having one half of the top floor each, and due to the large influx of boarders in year 9, they take up the entirety of the third floor.

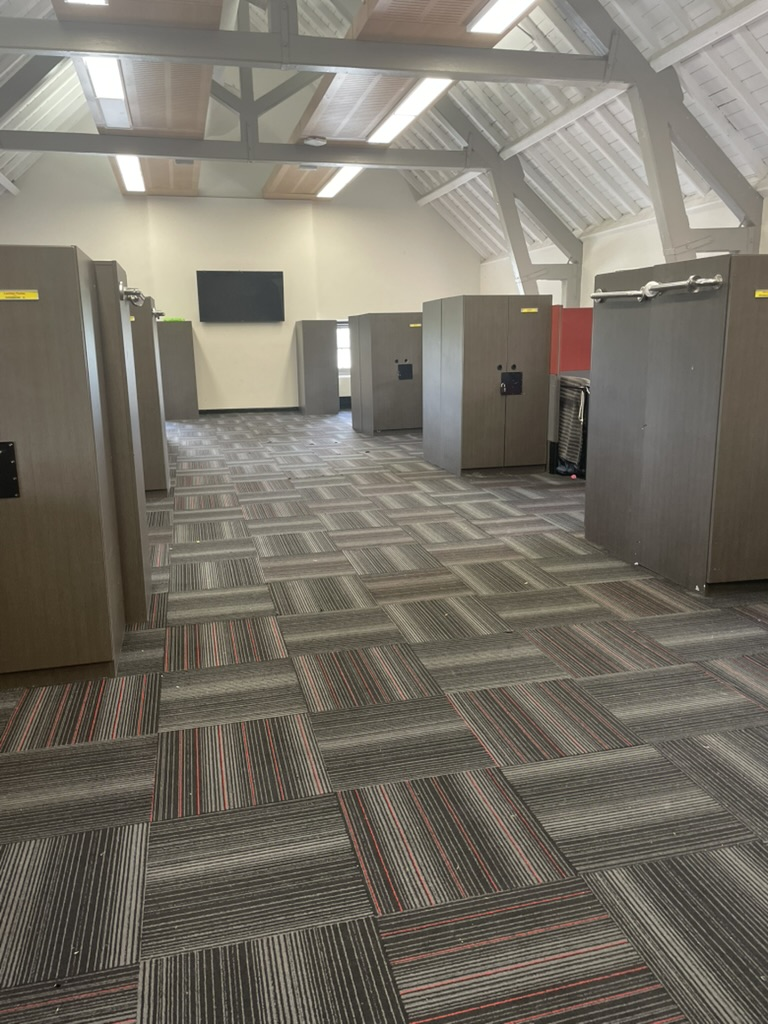
An example of a Year 8 Dormitory.

== Co-curriculum ==
St Joseph's College offers a variety of co-curricular activities, including Senior Orchestra, Chess and Debating.

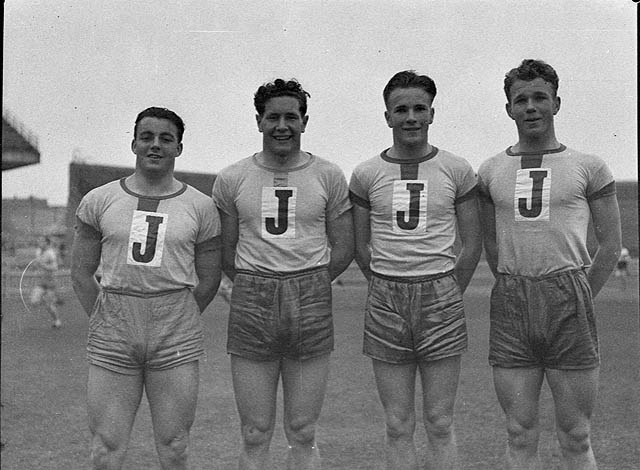
Joeys boys at GPS athletics, 1939

=== Sport ===
St Joseph's official sporting calendar revolves around competition with the eight other GPS Schools. However, it regularly competes against The Associated Schools (CAS) during the lead-up to each season, and as a member of the GPS (in GPS v CAS matches) at the end of each season.

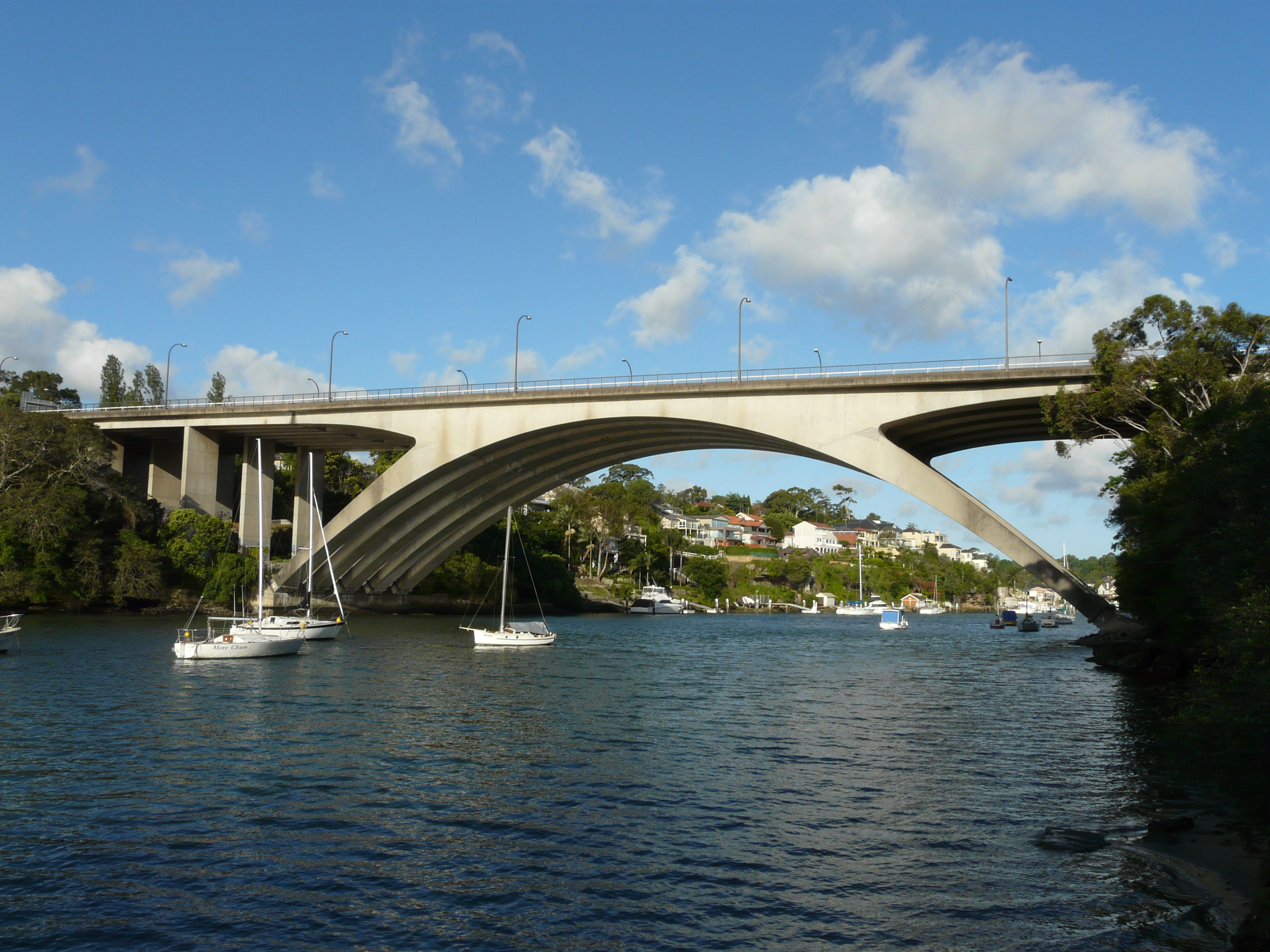
The Joeys boatshed is in Tarban Creek, a short walk from the College

GPS sports include athletics, Australian rules football, basketball, cricket, cross country, football (soccer), tennis, rowing, rugby union, swimming, and water polo.

==== Rugby union ====
St. Joseph's has a strong tradition in rugby union, being widely renowned as one of Australia's rugby nurseries. St. Joseph's joined the AAGPS (NSW) Rugby in 1895. Over the years, the college has produced many well known players who have represented at grade, state and national levels, including three Wallaby Captains. St. Joseph's history is displayed through their many 1st and 2nd XV premierships in the AAGPS competitions. Their most recent 1st XV success was in 2019, where the college won their 56th 1st XV premiership while the 2nd XV and 3rd XV were also undefeated to win their premierships.

==== Football ====
St Joseph's has a storied history in AAGPS Football, winning premierships in both the 1st & 2nd XI in the inaugural competition in 1988. The College has won five 1st XI premierships (1988, 1997, 2012, 2022, 2023) and three 2nd XI premierships (1988, 1998, 2012). The 'Lower Park' complex was refurbished in 2019 with a new grandstand and dugouts, and hosts one of the premier natural turf Football pitches in Sydney.

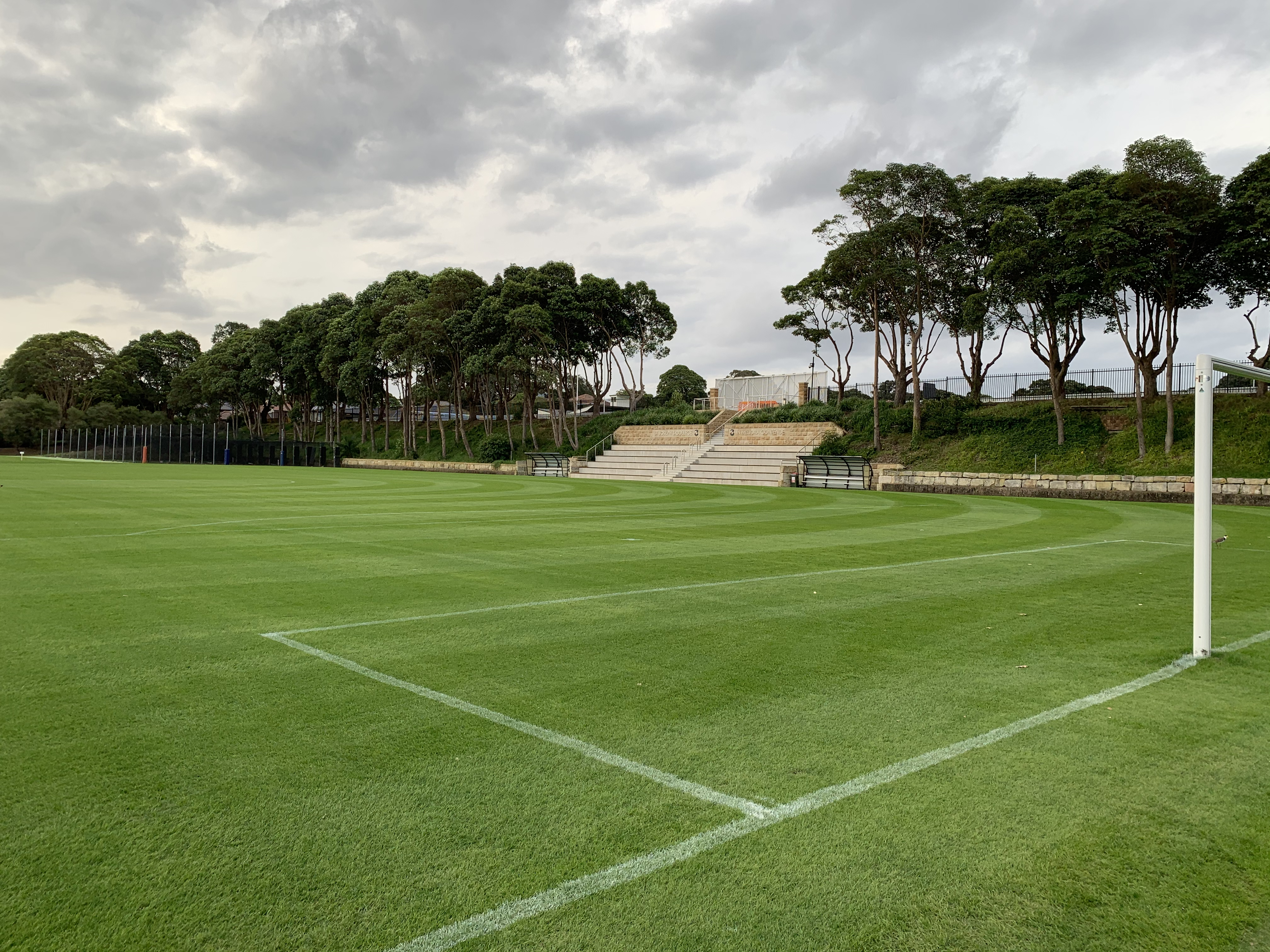
'Lower Park' at the Park complex.

==== Cricket ====
The college has always been strong in cricket, dating back to the inaugural AAGPS season, in which St. Joseph's shared the premiership along with Sydney Grammar School and Newington College. Stan McCabe remains the college's most well-known cricketer.

==== Rowing ====
St. Joseph's was the fourth Sydney school to take to the water (after Grammar, Riverview and Shore) and has been rowing in the GPS competition since 1907. Joeys had their inaugural GPS victory in 1911, then again in 1916. The College's 1st VIII victory in the 2015 race ended a drought dating back to 1973 at the AAGPS Head of the River. Joeys again won in 2024 with a great victory in the AAGPS Head of the river.

==== Basketball ====
St Joseph's has won the 1st GPS Basketball Competition 5 Times since it began in 1976 including the 1981, 1984, 1989, 1991 & 1993 seasons. St Joseph's has won the 2nd GPS Basketball Competition 15 Times including the 1976, 1979, 1984, 1986, 1987, 1988, 1989, 1990, 1991, 1993, 1995, 1996, 1997, 1998, 2014 seasons.

== Notable alumni: 'Old Boys' ==
Alumni of St Joseph's College, Hunter's Hill are commonly referred to as Old Boys, and may elect to join the schools alumni association, the St Joseph's College Old Boys' Union (SJCOBU).

== See also ==
- List of Catholic schools in New South Wales
- Catholic education in Australia
- List of boarding schools in Australia
- Lawrence Campbell Oratory Competition

== Bibliography ==
- Naughtin, M. 1981. A Century of Striving: St Joseph's College, Hunter's Hill, 1881-1981. Macarthur Press, Sydney. ISBN 0-9595559-6-X.
- Meliora Life, edition II May 2011 (a publication of the St Joseph's College Foundation Ltd).
