= Heidelberg Materials Australia =

Australian concrete company

- Formerly: Hanson; Pioneer International; Pioneer Concrete
- Type: Subsidiary
- Industry: Construction
- Founded: 1949
- Headquarters: Parramatta, Sydney, Australia
- Key people: Phil Schacht (CEO)
- Products: Building Materials
- Services: Ready-mix concrete
- Parent: Heidelberg Materials
- Subsidiaries: Alex Fraser Group (AUS); Cement Australia (AUS); Economix (VIC); Hanson Australia Cement (AUS); Hanson Precast (AUS); High Quality Concrete (NSW); Hymix Concrete (NSW); Midway Concrete (VIC); Pioneer Concrete (AUS); Pioneer North Queensland (QLD); XL Concrete (VIC)
- Website: www.heidelbergmaterials.com.au

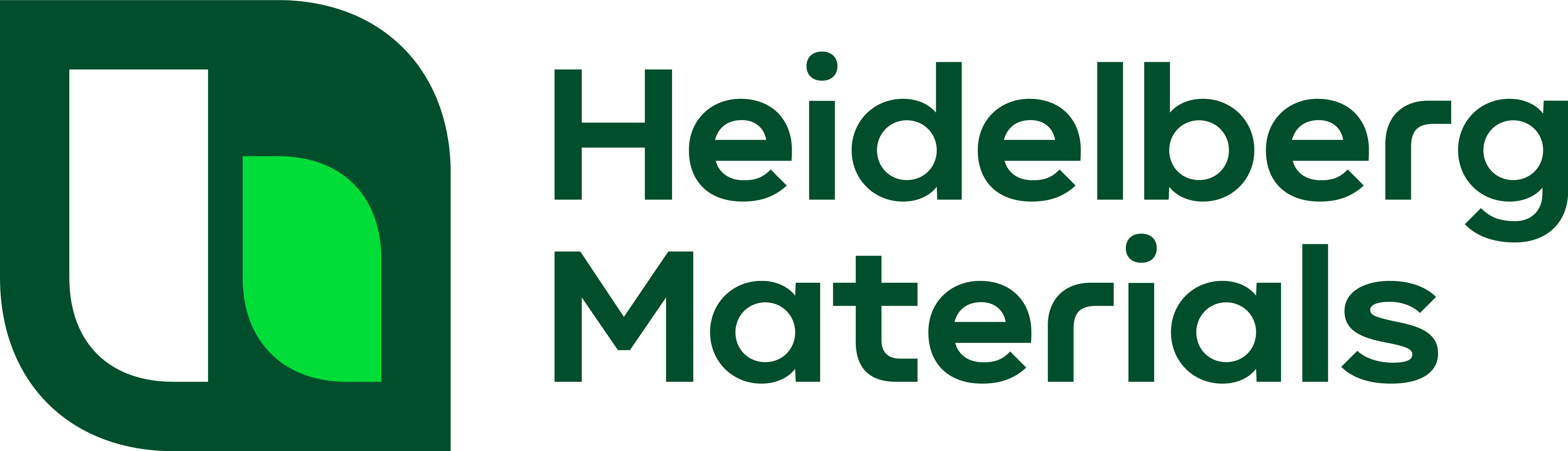
Heidelberg Materials Logo

Heidelberg Materials Australia is a premixed concrete, aggregates & precast company. Founded in 1949 as Pioneer Concrete & later re-branded to Pioneer International, its operations were taken over by Hanson in 1999 & re-branded as Hanson Australia. In Late 2024, Hanson was re-branded as Heidelberg Materials.

== History ==
Hanson Logo (HeidelbergCementGroup)

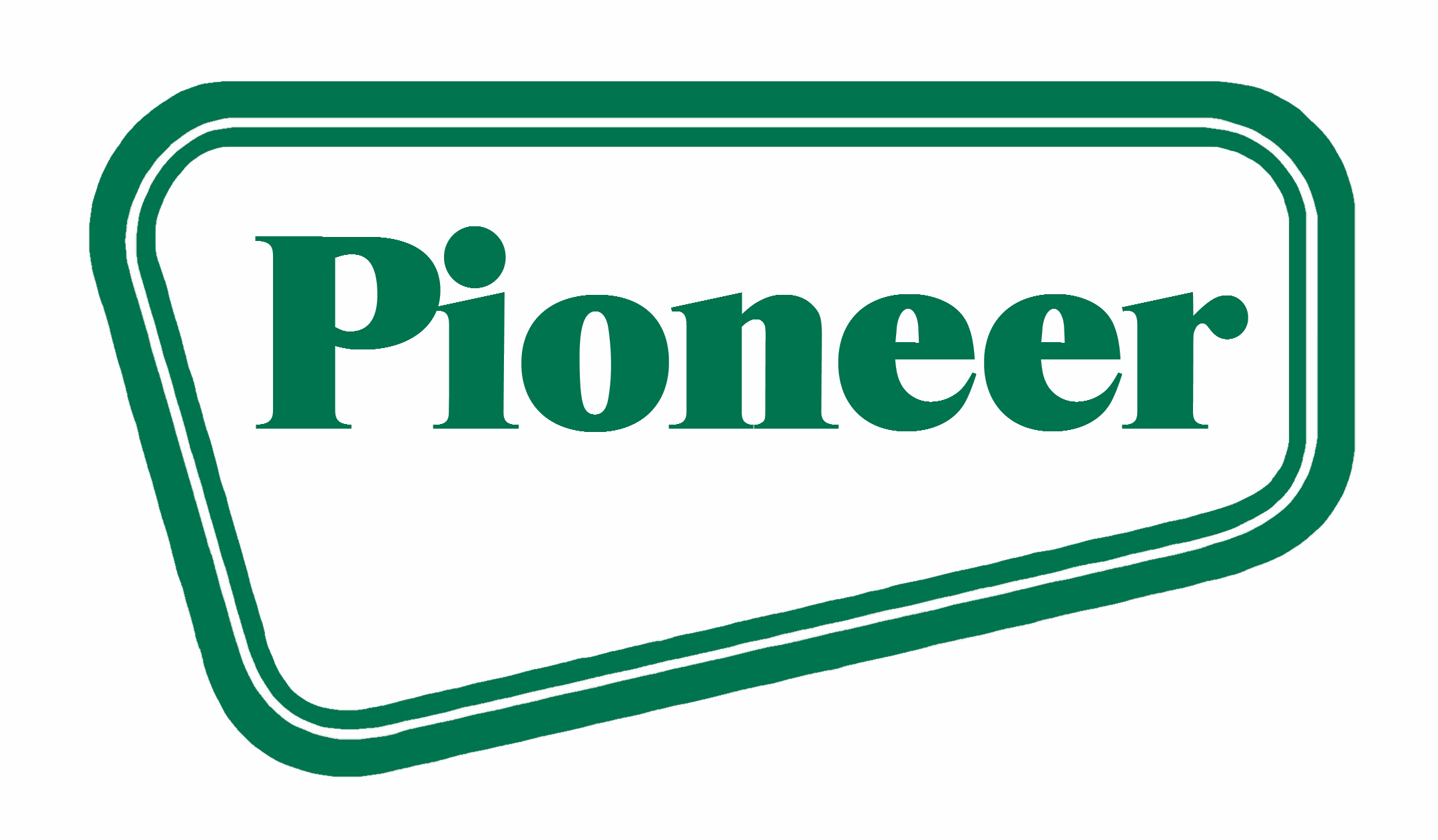
Pioneer Concrete Logo

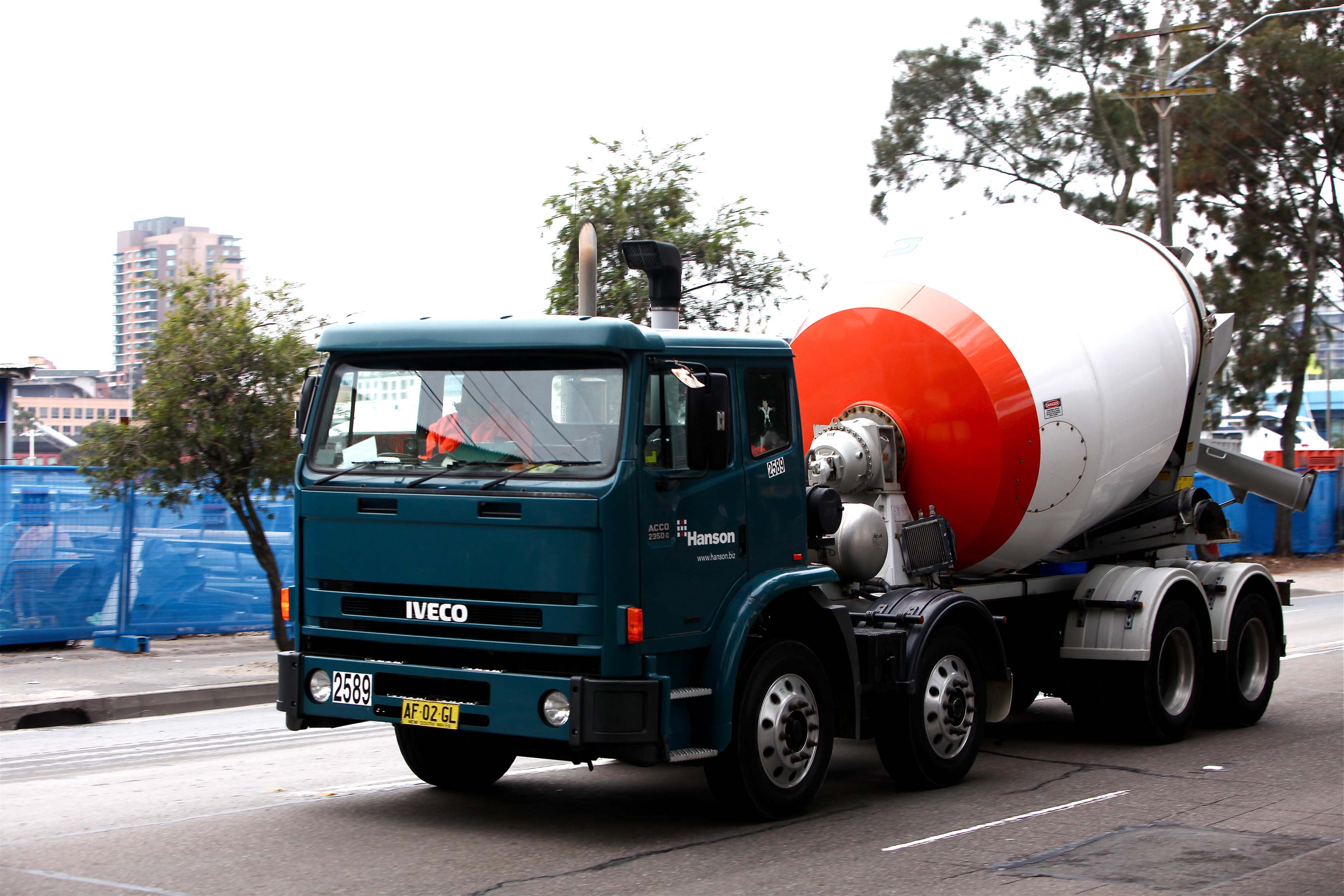
Hanson Concrete Truck (NSW) AU

In 1949, Pioneer Readymix was founded in St Peters, Sydney. In 1954, it was purchased by Tristan Antico & Kelvin Conley. In 1954, a concrete plant was acquired in Canberra. In 1959 it was listed on the Sydney Stock Market as a public company. As well as acquiring further concreting businesses, it diversified into building materials products.

In 1961, Pioneer purchased a pre-mix concrete plant in Hong Kong. In 1962, it commenced operations in the United Kingdom, later opening in Israel (1963) & Italy (1964). In 1965, it formed a joint venture with Shell Australia to enter the asphalt manufacture & supply industry. In the same year, the company diversified into aggregate quarrying in Hong Kong. In 1967, Pioneer acquired FW Williams Holdings that had plastic manufacturing operations & tea & coffee plantations in Papua New Guinea.

In 1970, Pioneer acquired pre-mix & quarrying companies in Spain. By the middle of the decade, the company's interests had spread to Asia, Africa & most of Europe. In 1973, in partnership with CSR, Pioneer acquired Australian & Kandos Cement Holdings.

In 1975, Pioneer diversified to heavily invest in a joint project with Pennzoil. In 1978, Pioneer became involved in a major coal coking & steaming development in the Hunter Valley area of New South Wales in a joint venture with the Electricity Commission of New South Wales & Ampol. In 1979, Pioneer acquired a 20% stake in Ampol, which was increased to 65% in 1980. Ampol & Pioneer made further mineral acquisitions with uranium producers Nabarlek Uranium Mine & Queensland Mines.

In 1983, Pioneer purchased British building materials producer Mixconcrete followed by Lone Star Industries' sand, gravel & quarrying operations in the United States in 1985. Pioneer was the subject of a hostile but ultimately unsuccessful takeover bid from FAI Insurance in 1986. In 1986, the building materials divisions in Italy, Portugal & South Africa were sold. In 1987, mineral & gold producer Giant Resources was acquired. In 1988, the company changed its name to Pioneer International & gained full control of Ampol.

In 1995, Ampol merged with Caltex Australia to form Ampol, with Pioneer holding a 50% shareholding. In 1997, Pioneer planned to exit the petroleum industry via a "two-step" process. First, Pioneer sold its shareholding to Caltex Australia in October 1997 in exchange for a 33% stake in Caltex Australia. Pioneer would then attempt to sell these Caltex Australia shares at a good price, which it eventually did through public offering in April 1998, allowing Pioneer to exit from the petroleum industry completely.

In 1998, Hymix Concrete was purchased. In 1999, Pioneer International was taken over by Heidelberg Materials UK. It was rebranded as Hanson Australia in 2004. In November 2024, Hanson Australia was rebranded to Heidelberg Materials.

As of 2026, Heidelberg Materials operates 210 ready-mix concrete plants & 71 aggregate operations.

== The History of Pioneer International's Operational Presence ==
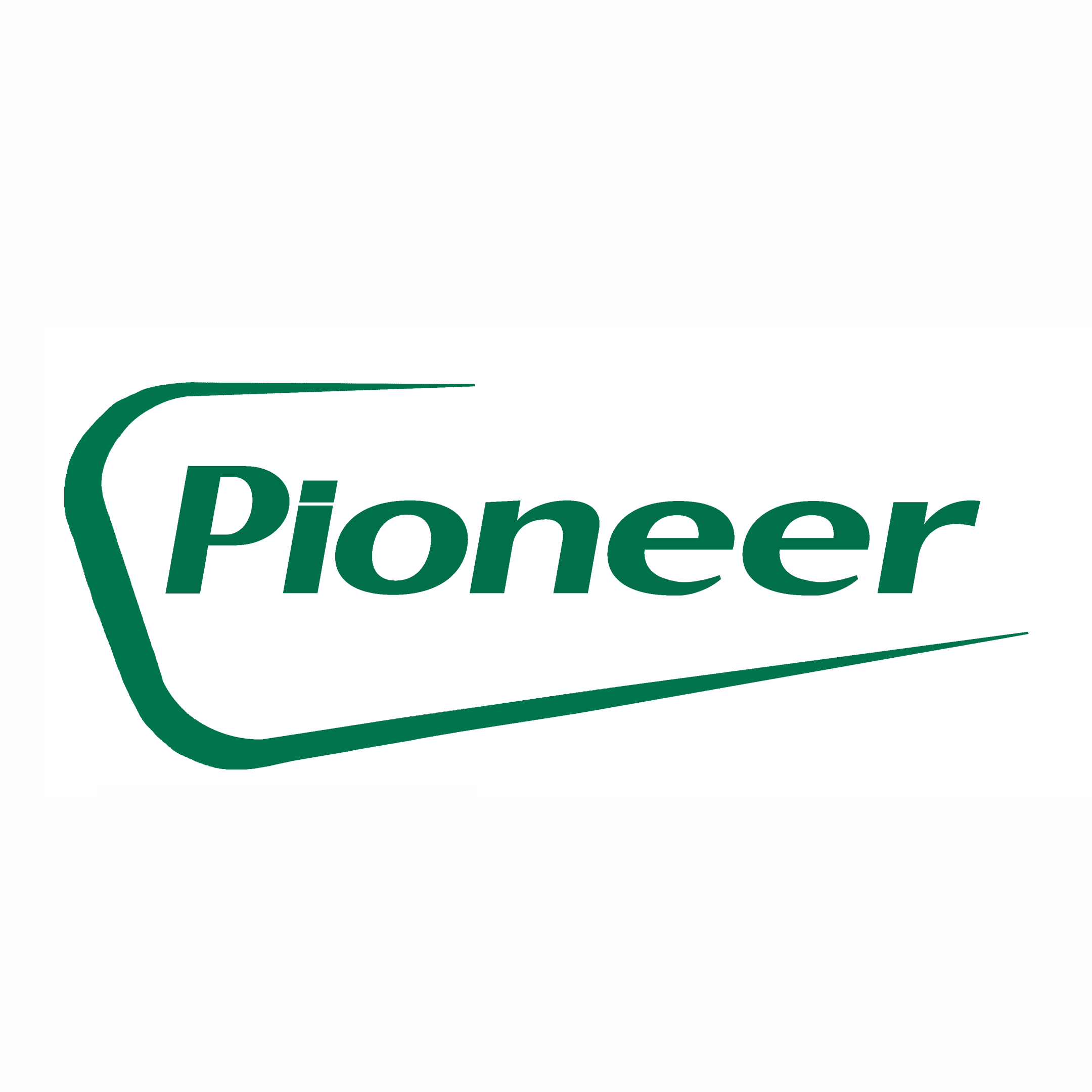
Pioneer Concrete Logo Final Rendition

During the height of their operations, Pioneer International products were marketed or distributed in the following countries & regions:

Australia, China, Czech Republic, Germany, Hong Kong, Indonesia, Israel, Italy, Malaysia, Netherlands, Norway, Papua New Guinea, Philippines, Portugal, Singapore, Spain, Thailand, United Kingdom, United States, Vietnam

By the late 1990s, Pioneer International had developed a significant international presence, selling its products to a wide range of markets across Europe, Asia, America & Oceania. Pioneer established an extensive network of distributors & representatives to support the sale of its construction materials outside of Australia. Pioneer's broad international footprint was considered unusual for an Australian corporation of the period, with particularly strong representation throughout Southeast Asia & Europe, where Pioneer's materials & equipment became associated with major construction & infrastructure projects.
