= Sydney Boys High School =

- Sydney Boys High School, as seen from Moore Park West

Location
- Cleveland Street, Moore Park, Sydney; Australia; 33°53′32″S 151°13′10″E

Information
- Type: Government-funded single-sex academically selective secondary day school
- Motto: Latin: Veritate et Virtute (With Truth and Courage)
- Established: 1 October 1883; 143 years ago
- School district: Port Jackson education area of the Sydney Region
- Educational authority: New South Wales Department of Education
- Principal: Kim Jaggar
- Years: 7–12
- Gender: Boys
- Enrolment: 1,215 (2022)
- Area: 34,400 square metres (370,000 sq ft)
- Campus type: Suburban
- Colours: Chocolate brown and sky blue
- Athletics: Athletic Association of the Great Public Schools of New South Wales
- Alumni: SBHS Old Boys
- Website: sydneyboys-h.schools.nsw.gov.au

Sydney Boys High School (SBHS), otherwise known as Sydney High School (SHS) or simply High, is an Australian government-funded single-sex academically selective secondary day school for boys, located at Moore Park, New South Wales, a suburb within the City of Sydney council.

Sydney Boys High was established in 1883 and is operated by the New South Wales Department of Education as a school within the Port Jackson Education Area of the Sydney Region. The school hosts approximately 1,200 students from Year 7 to Year 12 – a number greater than most other selective state schools – and is situated adjacent to its sister school, Sydney Girls' High School. The school is a member of the Athletic Association of the Great Public Schools of New South Wales (AAGPS).

The school was moved to its current site at Moore Park in 1928. The school is bounded by Moore Park (West), Anzac Parade, Sydney Girls High School and Cleveland Street.

The school regularly ranks within the top ten in New South Wales in terms of academic achievement, notably ranking 4th in the state in 2011 and 5th in the state in the 2017 Higher School Certificate (HSC), and has produced numerous notable alumni. In 2025, High was ranked 6th in the state.

== History ==
Sydney Boys High School was the first state high school in New South Wales and Australia. It was created under Premier Henry Parkes' public education system in the early 1880s following the Public Instruction Act 1880 (NSW).

Sydney Boys High School nor Sydney Girls High School has ever had a primary education division and are thus the first NSW state high schools founded for the express purpose of secondary education.

Sydney Boys High School was originally one collective unit merged with Sydney Girls; it was originally a mixed-sex school. Sydney High School was established as two single-sex schools sharing a single building, with boys and girls on separate floors. The first day of instruction – for 46 boys – was on 1 October 1883 and was located in a building on Castlereagh Street, designed by Francis Greenway and constructed by convicts. From 1883 to 1892, Sydney Boys occupied the lower floor and entered from the Castlereagh Street side of the building, whereas Sydney Girls occupied the upper floor and entered from the Elizabeth Street side. In 1924, this building would be demolished and both schools would, in 1921, have relocated to Moore Park. Presently, this site is home to the Elizabeth Street store of David Jones.

Second campus of Sydney Boys High School, at Mary Ann Street in Ultimo, in 1927.

In 1892, the boys' school was relocated to Mary Ann Street in Ultimo.

In 1906, Sydney Boys High School became a member of the Athletic Association of the Great Public Schools of New South Wales (AAGPS or GPS). (The term "public school" here has the meaning as used in the United Kingdom; that is, a private school). Despite this, it is the sporting association's only government (public) school member.

In 1928, the school moved to its current location at Moore Park, on the fringe of inner-city Sydney. This site was designed by George McRae, designer of the Queen Victoria Building. This site was previously the Moore Park Zoo, which was relocated to Mosman as Taronga Zoo.

== List of officers ==
Headmaster		President, SHSOBU	
Year	Name	Year	Name
1883	John Waterhouse		
1884–1895	Joseph Coates	1892–1894	J. Coates
1896–1915	J. Waterhouse	1902	A. M. Eedy
1896–1915	J. Waterhouse	1903	P. J. Pratt
1896–1915	J. Waterhouse	1904	C. H. Cooke
1896–1915	J. Waterhouse	1905	O. U Vonwiller
1896–1915	J. Waterhouse	1906	R. C. Frosyth
1896–1915	J. Waterhouse	1907	C. M. Drew
1896–1915	J. Waterhouse	1908	G. C. Saxby
1896–1915	J. Waterhouse	1909	C. A. Fairland
1896–1915	J. Waterhouse	1910	F. A. Todd
1896–1915	J. Waterhouse	1911	P. S. Hunt
1896–1915	J. Waterhouse	1912	G. C. Saxby
1896–1915	J. Waterhouse	1913	A. Bohrsman
1896–1915	J. Waterhouse	1914–1915	A. G. Henderson
1916–1918	R. J. Hinder	1916	W. G. Lewes
1916–1918	R. J. Hinder	1917–1918	E. J. Hooke
1919–1924	C. R. Smith	1919–1920	H. K. Prior
1919–1924	C. R. Smith	1921–1922	L. F. Watt
1919–1924	C. R. Smith	1923	W. W. Vick
1919–1924	C. R. Smith	1924	A. M. Eedy
1925–1933	G. C. Saxby	1925–1927	R. T. McKay
1925–1933	G. C. Saxby	1928	A. M. Eedy
1925–1933	G. C. Saxby	1929	W. J. Cleary
1925–1933	G. C. Saxby	1930–1931	O. A. A. Diethelm
1925–1933	G. C. Saxby	1932	H. F. Halloran
1925–1933	G. C. Saxby	1933–1934	S. A. Smith
1934–1935	F. McMullen	1933–1934	S. A. Smith
1934–1935	F. McMullen	1935–1936	C. G. McDonald
1936–1951	J. H. Killip	1935–1936	C. G. McDonald
1936–1951	J. H. Killip	1937	G. F. Diamond
1936–1951	J. H. Killip	1938–1939	J. R. Nield
1936–1951	J. H. Killip	1940	G. Hardwicke
1936–1951	J. H. Killip	1941–1942	C. N. Hirst
1936–1951	J. H. Killip	1943	E. Pye
1936–1951	J. H. Killip	1944–1946	G. Hardwicke
1936–1951	J. H. Killip	1947–1948	D. J. Duffy
1936–1951	J. H. Killip	1949–1950	A. R. Beveridge
1936–1951	J. H. Killip	1951–1952	K. C. Cameron
1952–1954	G. Barr	1951–1952	K. C. Cameron
1952–1954	G. Barr	1953	P. G. Saywell
1952–1954	G. Barr	1954–1956	A. R. Callaway
1955–1963	K. J. Andrews	1954–1956	A. R. Callaway
1955–1963	K. J. Andrews	1957–1959	D. J. Duffy
1955–1963	K. J. Andrews	1960–1962	A. Ferguson
1955–1963	K. J. Andrews	1963–1964	W. McMurray
1964–1973	M. R. Callaghan	1963–1964	W. McMurray
1964–1973	M. R. Callaghan	1965–1966	C. E. H. Rubie
1964–1973	M. R. Callaghan	1967–1968	A. F. Deer
1964–1973	M. R. Callaghan	1969–1970	Sir G. Wallace
1964–1973	M. R. Callaghan	1971–1972	K. Torrington
1964–1973	M. R. Callaghan	1973–1974	Sir B. Sugerman
1974–1976	G. J. Bradford	1973–1974	Sir B. Sugerman
1974–1976	G. J. Bradford	1975–1977	S. Livingston
1977–1991	Bob Outterside	1975–1977	S. Livingston
1977–1991	Bob Outterside	1978–1979	E. S. Swinbourne
1977–1991	Bob Outterside	1980–1981	P. A. Musgrove
1977–1991	Bob Outterside	1982–1985	B. H. Pyke
1977–1991	Bob Outterside	1986–1987	J. M. Challen
1977–1991	Bob Outterside	1988	B. H. Pyke
1977–1991	Bob Outterside	1989–1990	M. Aikin
1977–1991	Bob Outterside	1991–1992	R. Mitchell
1992–1999	R. J. Stratford	1991–1992	R. Mitchell
1992–1999	R. J. Stratford	1993–1998	J. Norrie
1992–1999	R. J. Stratford	1999–2000	N. Scudder
2000–present	K. A. Jaggar	1999–2000	N. Scudder
2000–present	K. A. Jaggar	2001–2004	J. Goddard
2000–present	K. A. Jaggar	2005–2006	M. Livingston
2000–present	K. A. Jaggar	2007–2012	J. Waugh
2000–present	K. A. Jaggar	2013–2014	R. Bowey
2000–present	K. A. Jaggar	2015–2018	P. Almond
2000–present	K. A. Jaggar	2019–2024	P. Harapin
2000–present	K. A. Jaggar	2024–present	J. Ezrakhovich

Headmaster was renamed to principal in 1992.

The Sydney High School Old Boys' Union lapsed from 1895 to 1901 due to lack of enrolments.

== Academic ==
=== Enrolments ===
Year 7 – the first year – intakes 180 students, but students from higher grades may be granted admittance provided vacancies exist. Offers of admission into the school in Year 7 are based on achievement in the Selective High School Placement Test.

In Years 7 to 8, the cohorts each consist of 180 students; in Years 9 to 12, however, cohorts consist of 210 students each per the 2001 SBHS Enrolment Policy., where students who may not have gotten in through the Selective High School Placement test may try again.

Once admitted and matriculated, students are further grouped according to their abilities, as estimated by their scores in relevant fields in the Selective High School Placement Test. Proven proficiencies in music, as demonstrated by a proper formal qualification (e.g., Australian Music Examinations Board grades) also serve assessment.

=== Academic results ===
Sydney Boys High School has been historically known and is known for its academic achievement in the Higher School Certificate.

The following table shows the school's rankings relative to other schools in the state. The rankings are based on the percentage of exams sat that resulted in a placing on the Distinguished Achievers List (highest band result) as shown by the New South Wales Education Standards Authority.

Year	Ranking
2007	10
2008	7
2009	7
2010	6
2011	4
2012	8
2013	7
2014	6
2015	5
2016	7
2017	5
2018	7
2019	10
2020	10
2021	13
2022	11
2023	13
2024	9
2025	6

=== Departments ===
The curriculum, endorsed by the New South Wales Education Standards Authority, is taught by the following 12 departments:

- English
  - English (Year 7–10)
  - English Advanced (Year 11–12)
  - English Extension 1 (Year 11–12)
  - English Extension 2 (Year 12)
- Mathematics
  - Mathematics (Year 7–10)
  - Mathematics Advanced (Year 11–12)
  - Mathematics Extension 1 (Year 11–12)
  - Mathematics Extension 2 (Year 12)
- Science
  - Science (Year 7–10)
  - Biology (Year 11–12)
  - Chemistry (Year 11–12)
  - Physics (Year 11–12)
- Computing studies
  - Information Processes and Technology
- Industrial arts
  - Engineering Studies
- Music
  - Music 1
  - Music 2
  - Music Extension
- Visual arts
  - Visual Arts
- History
  - History (Year 7–9)
  - History Elective (Year 10)
  - Ancient History (Year 11–12)
  - Modern History (Year 11–12)
  - History Extension (Year 12)
- Social Science
  - Geography (Year 7–9)
  - Geography Elective (Year 10)
  - Geography (Year 11–12)
  - Business Studies (Year 11–12)
  - Economics (Year 11–12)
  - Legal Studies (Year 11–12)
- Languages Other than English (LOTE)

Classical languages
- Latin
- Ancient Greek

Modern Languages
- French
- Chinese
- German
- Japanese

== Grounds, buildings, and facilities ==
The current Moore Park site hosts the Great Hall, other school buildings, tennis courts, a gymnasium, the Junior Quadrangle, and the Flat, a common low-lying area of land between Sydney Boys and Sydney Girls' High Schools. The school buildings include approximately 60 classrooms, two change rooms, the Junior Library (for Years 7–9), and the Senior Library (for Years 10–12). Nearby to the school are a number of sports facilities, such as the tennis courts opposite to the Sydney Boys and Girls High Schools, located on Cleveland Street, and the facilities at Centennial Park.

Sydney Boys High School is affiliated with other facilities such as the Outterside Centre (the school boatshed located in Abbotsford) and the ANZAC Rifle Range. In addition to this, the school owns a number of vehicles, which it utilises to travel to sporting events, such as the annual The Armidale School versus the High School sporting exchange Armidale and the Head of the River at the Sydney International Regatta Centre.

In addition, SBHS has its own cadet unit, which won the 23 Battalion AFX Trophy in 2012 and 2013.

During major sporting events, Sydney Boys High School may also rent out its parking space for $10 along with any available spaces in the school.

== Co- and extracurricular activities ==
=== Debating and public speaking ===
Sydney Boys has achieved notability in debating, having won the Hume Barbour trophy and Karl Cramp trophy 26 times and 14 times respectively, more than any other school.

The school also competes in the Lawrence Campbell Oratory Competition and the GPS debating competition. The SBHS First Grade debating team have won the GPS Debating premiership 20 times, most recently in 2024.

The school is also very prolific in Chess, having won the Terrey Shaw Shield and the NSWJCL Interschool State Chess Championship 17 and 22 times respectively.

=== Sport ===
Sydney Boys High School has a long tradition of sports, in addition to academic scholarship and, stipulating that students must participate in sports until Year 12, offers students a wide range of sports, including:

- Athletics
- Association football (soccer), AAGPS (NSW) Soccer
- Basketball, AAGPS (NSW) Basketball
- Cricket
- Cross country running
- Fencing
- Rifle shooting
- Rowing
- Rugby union, AAGPS (NSW) Rugby
- Sailing
- Swimming
- Table tennis
- Tennis
- Volleyball
- Water Polo (in the combined GPS/CAS competition)

Sydney Boys High School is the sole state-operated member school of the Athletic Association of the Great Public Schools of New South Wales since 1906. It therefore competes against other GPS schools in many of the aforementioned sports, including the traditional English public school sports of cricket, rowing, and rugby union. Accordingly, and unusually for a state school, the school possess rowing facilities at the Outterside Centre at Abbotsford, which includes a dormitory, boat sheds, and three pontoons; playing fields at Centennial Park, with the Fairland Pavilion and the McKay Oval, a fenced cricket ground; and, facilities at the ANZAC Rifle Range, which are managed by the Sydney High School Rifle Club.

==== Basketball Team Achievements ====
===== Championship Men (Open) =====
- Australian Schools Championships

(gold) Champions: (2) 2010, 2011
(bronze) Third Place: 2013, 2014

== School traditions ==
=== House system ===
Each student at Sydney Boys High School is placed into one of six houses, and each year is evenly divided into these houses. These houses, named after early Old Boys who have significantly contributed to and served the school, are:

House name	Colour	Namesake
Eedy (E)	Sky blue	Arthur Malcolm Eedy, a student in the first intake (1883–1886)
Fairland (F)	Red	Charles Adam Fairland
McKay (M)	Yellow	Robert Thomas McKay
Rubie (R)	White	Cecil Edward Henning "Cec" Rubie, a student (1925–1928) and President of the Old Boys Union (1965–1966)
Saxby (S)	Green	George Campbell Saxby, a student in the second intake (1884–1887) and the fifth headmaster of the school
Torrington (T)	Navy blue	

As of late, these houses, as at the Year 7 intake, have been grouped according to the strengths and weaknesses of the students, with an outrider class, English skills enhancement class, music proficiency class, sports proficiency class, and language preference class. In addition to these, an English enrichment group and a general abilities group may also be formed.

== Notable actions ==
Sydney Boys High School has caught the attention of the media and/or the general public during certain times. It has seen several previous minorities matriculate to and graduate from it. Such minorities include non-British, non-Irish European minorities, such as Italian Australians, Maltese Australians, and Greek Australians. In 2002, the school had the attention of the media over comments made by Old Boys in regard to its ethnic composition – mostly East Asian and South Asian.

In 2002, "Sydney Boys High School wanted a more sophisticated admissions process, and more freedom to choose its own students." In 2002, it was proposed that, of the 180 Year 7 places, 30 places would be allocated each year on the basis of the Selective Schools Entrance Test (with no extended writing requirement), a detailed curriculum vitae, two school reports, and their achievements in civic, sporting, community, and leadership involvement. This is similar to the manner by which students are admitted to some private schools.

In 2013, the school was again featured in the media for its proposal to modify its selection criteria. This proposal involved reserving 30 places of the annual Year 7 intake of 180 places for local boys who live within 5 kilometres (3.1 mi) of the school. Connolly stated that "any racial undertones to earlier campaigns were a thing of the past" and that "the benefit for the school this time is about tying it to its local community". The proposal would, in theory, reduce the load on overcrowded local high schools. However, this proposal was rejected, as stated in a Sydney Morning Herald article, and would be a short-term resolution to the problem.

As of the 2012 edition of the New South Wales Department of Education and Communities statistics, more than 80% of the students enrolled at Sydney Boys High School have a language background other than English; however, this is not to suggest that these students and their parents or guardians are all recent immigrants or not proficient in English or, broadly, that the school is not necessarily lacking in diversity.

In recent years, an increasing number of "sport[s] imports" have been admitted in later years, to bolster the school's ability to more competitively participate in sports against other members of the AAGPS. This drew allegations of Sydney Boys High School of being unmeritocratic in its selection process. Furthermore, in part due to the English public school nature of the school and the AAGPS, of which the school is a member, claims of nepotism and other favouritism have been levelled against the school. Brothers, sons, and grandsons of students or Old Boys have been allowed to enrol, though they may not have met the rigorous selection criteria. Some old boys, however, argue that where former graduates living in the community have sons and guardians at the school there is greater parental involvement at the school.

One eminent alumnus of the school, James Spigelman, former Chief Justice of New South Wales, said in an address at the school dated 16 February 1999, that:

... Our careers are particular manifestations of the ability of this school, by reason of its tradition of selection on the grounds of academic excellence, to make available opportunities to persons from backgrounds which may otherwise restrict such opportunities. The ability to obtain an education which is pitched at a level appropriate to the capacities of particular students, is the basis for the equality of opportunity, to which I have referred. ...

== Notable alumni ==
Sydney Boys High School has produced numerous prominent alumni, referred to as "Old Boys". Many graduates are active in alumni organisations, such as the Sydney High School Old Boys Union (OBU), the High Club, and High Rugby Friends.

Scott Morrison, a Prime Minister of Australia (2018–2022), is an alumnus of Sydney Boys High School.

== See also ==
- List of government schools in New South Wales
- List of selective high schools in New South Wales
