= AAGPS (NSW) Soccer =

Australian soccer event

This is an annual football competition played by teams from Sydney, Australia based boys high schools who are members of the AAGPS

== History ==
The official football competition commenced in 1988

- 1st Grade The Wanderers' Cup for AAGPS Soccer presented in 1988 by The King's School to mark the first school-based game of Soccer in Australia between The King's School and The Gentlemen Wanderers played in Parramatta on 14 August 1880.
- 2nd Grade GPS 2nd Soccer XI Premiership first awarded in 1988.
- From 2015 onwards, a GPS Plate competition was established and is played in Term 2 prior to the Premiership.

== Results ==
=== 1988 to 1999 ===
Results
| Year | 1st Grade | 2nd Grade |
|---|---|---|
| 1988 | St Joseph's | St Joseph's |
| 1989 | Newington | Shore |
| 1990 | Grammar | High,Newington |
| 1991 | High, Newington | Newington |
| 1992 | Newington | High |
| 1993 | High | Grammar |
| 1994 | St Joseph's | High |
| 1995 | High | Newington |
| 1996 | Newington | Newington |
| 1997 | St Joseph's | Newington |
| 1998 | Newington,Grammar | St Joseph's |
| 1999 | St Ignatius' | St Ignatius' |

=== Year 2000 onwards ===
Results
| Year | 1st Grade | 2nd Grade |
|---|---|---|
| 2000 | Riverview | Riverview |
| 2001 | Riverview | High |
| 2002 | Riverview | Riverview |
| 2003 | Riverview | Newington |
| 2004 | Grammar | Grammar |
| 2005 | Shore | Shore |
| 2006 | Newington | Kings, Newington, Riverview |
| 2007 | Riverview | Riverview |
| 2008 | Riverview | Riverview |
| 2009 | Riverview | Newington |
| 2010 | Riverview | Riverview |
| 2011 | Scots | Newington |
| 2012 | St Joseph's | St Joseph's |
| 2013 | Riverview | Newington |
| 2014 | Newington | Riverview |
| 2015 | Shore | Newington |
| 2016 | Shore | Riverview |
| 2017 | Riverview, Newington | Riverview |
| 2018 | Riverview | Newington |
| 2019 | Riverview | Scots |
| 2020 | Riverview | Grammar |
| 2021 | *Cancelled due to Covid-19 | *Cancelled due to Covid-19 |
| 2022 | St Joseph's | Riverview |
| 2023 | St Joseph's | Newington |
| 2024 | High | Grammar |
| 2025 | Newington(Undefeated) | Newington |

- 2012 marked the 25th anniversary of AAGPS Football with St Joseph's College repeating the same feat that they achieved in the very first season of AAGPS in 1988, that is, taking out both the First and Seconds Competitions.

GPS Plate Competition

Competition commenced in 2015 with all metropolitan schools competing for the 1st XI and 2nd XI GPS ‘Plate’ trophy. The competition is played in Term 2 prior to the Premiership Rounds.

* Schools are divided into two Pools comprising four teams.

* Each school plays in the Preliminary Rounds.

* Schools are ranked after the preliminary Rounds to determine the finals by playing the correspondingly ranked team in the other pool

| | 1st Grade | 2nd Grade |
|---|---|---|
| 2015 | St Joseph's | Riverview, Newington |
| 2016 | Newington | Newington |
| 2017 | Newington | Newington |
| 2018 | Riverview | Newington |
| 2019 | Grammar | Newington |
| 2020 | *Cancelled due to Covid-19 | * Cancelled due to Covid-19 |
| 2021 | Grammar | Grammar |
| 2022 | Riverview | Scots |
| 2023 | Newington | Grammar |
| 2024 | Newington | Kings |
| 2025 | Scots | |

== See also ==
- Athletic Association of the Great Public Schools of New South Wales
- AAGPS (NSW) Rugby
- AAGPS (NSW) Basketball
- Head of the River (New South Wales)
