= Athletic Association of the Great Public Schools of New South Wales =

School association in Australia

- Formation: 1892
- Headquarters: Sydney, New South Wales, Australia
- Members: The King's School; Sydney Grammar School; Newington College; Saint Ignatius' College; St Joseph's College; Sydney Boys High School; Shore School; The Scots College; The Armidale School
- Official language: English
- General Secretary: President: Robert Grant AO; Chairman: Michael Curran (Sydney Grammar); Hon Secretary: Mark Gainford (Sydney Boys High School); Hon Treasurer: Peter Phipps The King's School
- Website: aagps.nsw.edu.au

The Athletic Association of the Great Public Schools of New South Wales (AAGPS) is a sporting association of boys' schools in New South Wales, Australia that contest sporting events among themselves. The AAGPS was formed on 30 March 1892, and today has nine members – eight Sydney schools and one northern NSW country school. The descriptor 'Public School' references the historical usage of the term and the model of the British public school; all except Sydney Boys High School are in modern parlance private schools.

AAGPS representative sports sides are selected typically for matches against representative sides from Combined Associated Schools (CAS), Independent Sporting Association (ISA) and Combined High Schools (CHS).

Of the 130 Rhodes Scholars from 1904 to 2006 and from New South Wales, 85 attended a GPS School and of the 12 Australian prime ministers that attended school in Sydney from 1902 to 2023, 6 attended a GPS school specifically Sydney Grammar School, Sydney Boys High, Shore School or St Ignatius College, Riverview.

== History ==
The Athletic Association of the Great Public Schools of New South Wales (AAGPS) was formed at a meeting held at Gunsler's Café, near Circular Quay, on 30 March 1892. The schools represented at this first meeting were The King's School, Saint Ignatius' College, St Joseph's College, All Saints' College, Bathurst and Shore School. On 12 April, representatives from Sydney Grammar School, Newington College and Cooerwull Academy joined those who had attended the first meeting.

A third meeting was held on 28 April 1892, where membership of the AAGPS was clarified, and St Patrick's College, Goulburn, St Stanislaus College, Bathurst, and The Scots College joined those Schools who attended the first two meetings.

Sydney Boys High School applied for membership in March 1894, but were not accepted for admission until 14 February 1906. The final entrant was The Armidale School, who was admitted to the Association on 7 May 1897.

== Schools ==
=== Current member schools ===
School	Location	Enrolment	Founded	Denomination	Day/boarding	Year entered competition	School Colours	Also known as
The King's School	North Parramatta	2100	1831	Anglican	Day and boarding	1892	Sky blue and white	King's, TKS
Sydney Grammar School	Darlinghurst	1109	1854	Non-denominational	Day	1892	Black and gold	Grammar, SGS
Newington College	Stanmore	1600	1863	Uniting Church	Day and boarding	1892	Black and white	Newington, Newo, New, NC, Newingtonia
Saint Ignatius' College	Riverview	1569	1880	Roman Catholic	Day and boarding	1892	Royal blue and white	Iggies, View, Riverview, SIC
St Joseph's College	Hunters Hill	1100	1881	Roman Catholic	Day and boarding	1892	Cerise and royal blue	Joeys, SJC, Joeboys
Sydney Boys High School	Moore Park	1210	1883	Secular	Day	1906	Chocolate and sky blue	High, Sydney High, Sydney Boys, SBHS
Shore School	North Sydney	1207	1889	Anglican	Day and boarding	1892	Navy and white	Shore, Sydney Church of England Grammar School, SCEGS, E
The Scots College	Bellevue Hill	1800	1892	Presbyterian	Day and boarding	1893	Navy and gold	Scots, TSC
The Armidale School	Armidale	800	1894	Anglican	Day and boarding	1897	Navy and straw	Armidale, TAS

=== Former member schools ===
School	Location	Founded	Denomination	Day/boarding	Year entered competition	Current status
St Stanislaus' College	Bathurst	1867	Roman Catholic	Boys; Day and boarding	1892	now a member of the Independent Sporting Association
All Saints' College	Bathurst	1873	Anglican	Co-educational; Day and boarding	1892	now an associate member of the Independent Sporting Association
Cooerwull Academy	Lithgow	1851	Presbyterian	Day and boarding	1892	closed during World War I
St Patrick's College	Goulburn	1873	Roman Catholic	Day and boarding	1892	now Trinity Catholic College

== Sports and trophies ==
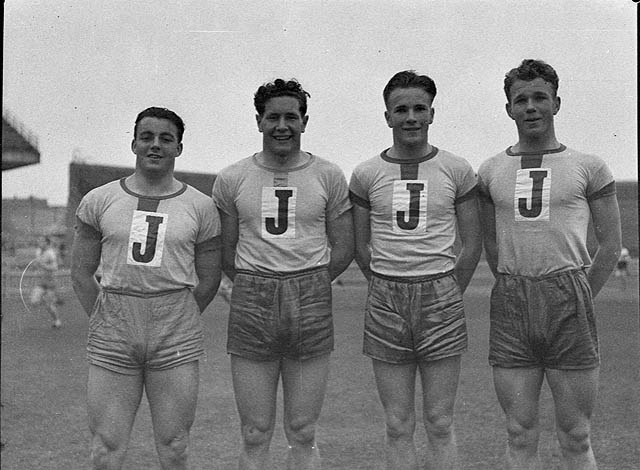
St Joseph's students at AAGPS athletics, 1939

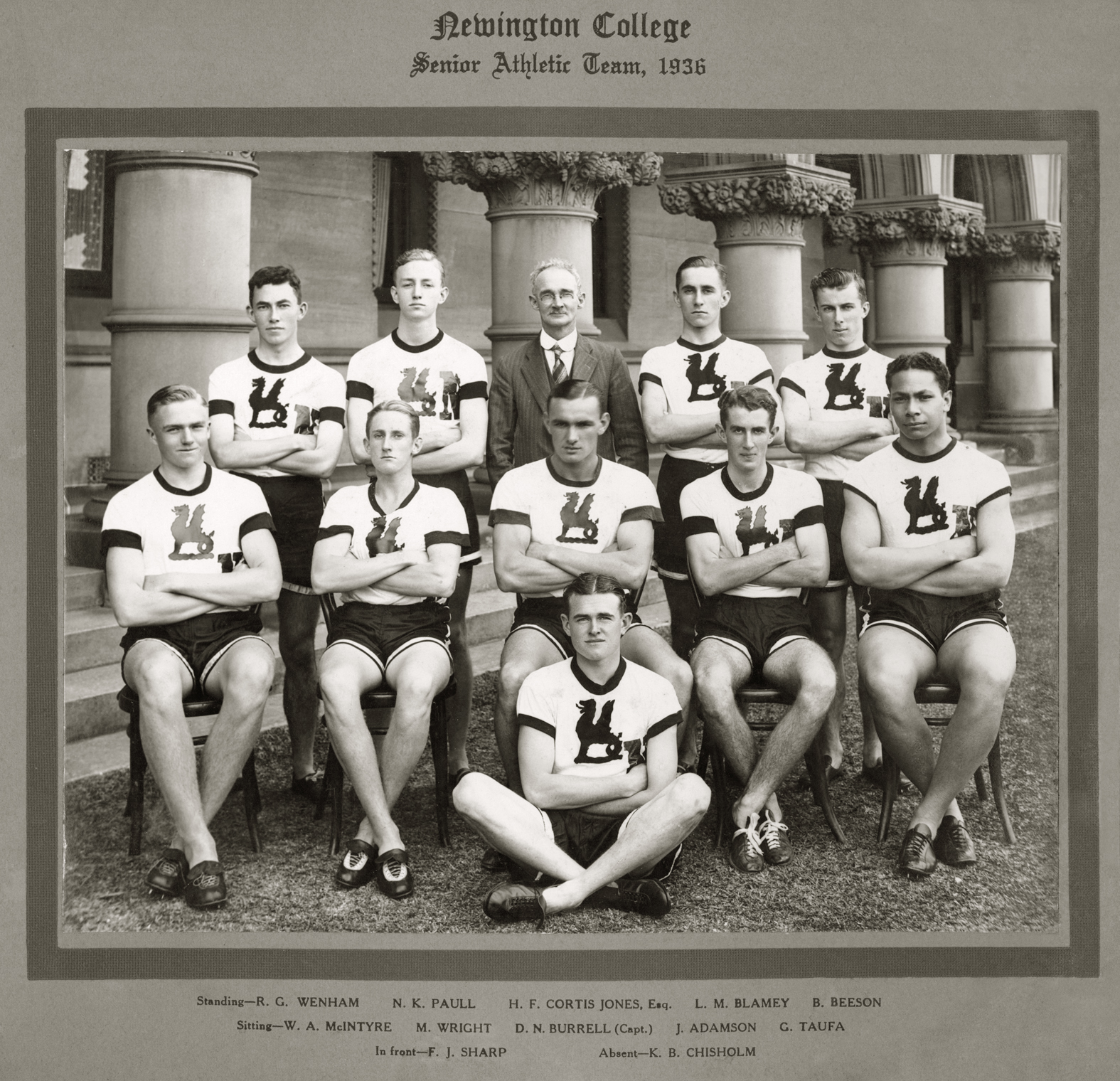
Newington's senior athletics team, 1936

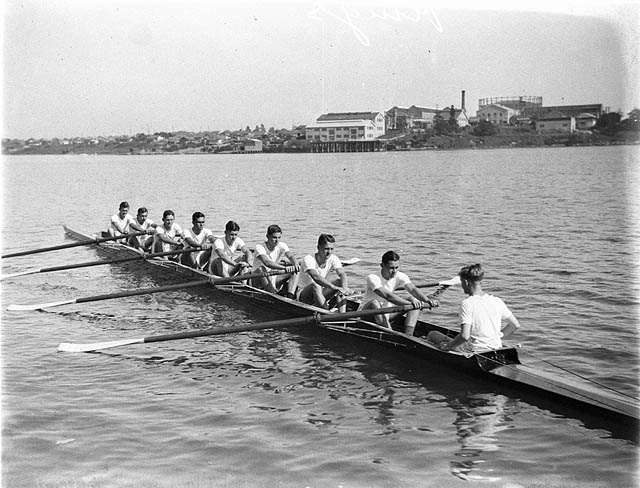
The King's School eight-oar crew, 1932

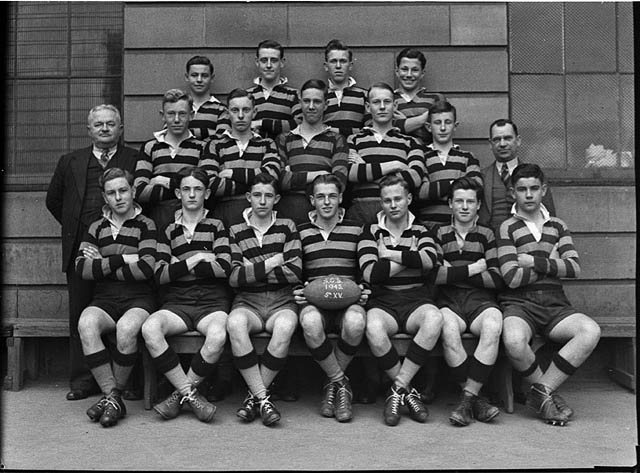
Sydney Grammar School 5th XV, 1945

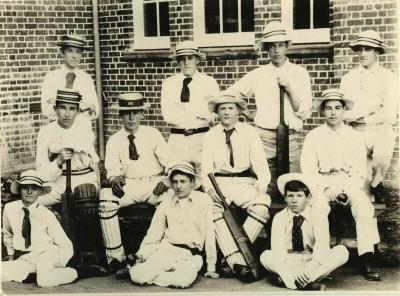
The Armidale School 1st XI cricket team, 1895

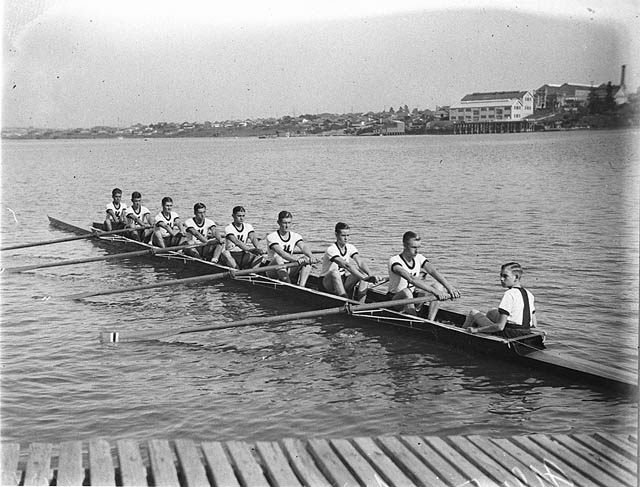
Newington's eight-oar crew, 1932

The sports contested are:

=== Rugby union ===
The official rugby union competition commenced in 1892.

- 1st Grade School Challenge Trophy Presented by the President and Vice Presidents of The New South Wales Rugby Football Union was first awarded in 1986 replacing an earlier shield. The current holders of the School Challenge Trophy as of 2025 are Saint Ignatius' College, Riverview.
- 2nd Grade W.S.Corr Shield. The shield has "AAGPS 2nd Grade Football" engraved on it. It was first presented in 1913. The current holders of the W.S.Corr Shield as of 2025 are St Joseph's College.

=== Athletics ===
The official athletics competition commenced in 1892. In 1912 the competition was divided into two levels – senior and junior. In 2012 a third level, intermediate, was added.

- Senior Championship Shield for Athletics was first awarded in 1895. In 1908 a new Senior Shield replaced a previous trophy which was full having been first presented in 1873 when a race for All Schools was first held at each school carnival. The new shield was back dated to 1895. The current holders from 2024 are The Scots College.
- The Intermediate Championship for Athletics was first awarded in 2012 to The King's School. The holders of 2024 are The King's School.
- Junior Athletic Championship AAAGPS was first awarded in 1912 and presented to Athletic Association of the Great Public Schools of NSW 11 May 1895. Engraved on the back is "The Ladies Challenge Plate". The holders as of 2024 are The King's School.

=== Cricket ===
The official cricket competition commenced in 1893. As early as 1897 the competition was in First and Second Grade.

- 1st XI A.A.G.P.S. Challenge Shield for Cricket first awarded in 1893 and currently held by The Scots College as of 2024.
- 2nd XI A.A.G.P.S Cricket Second Grade first awarded in 1915 and currently held by Newington College as of 2024.

=== Rowing ===
The official rowing competition commenced in 1893. Some schools had competed at club competition before then. The Head of the River is the main event of the rowing season. It takes place annually in the first term at the Sydney International Regatta Centre.

- 1st VIII 1910 onwards Major Rennie Trophy presented by Z.C. Rennie in 1894. Prior to 1910 the Major Rennie Trophy was awarded for the First Four race, there being no First Eight race until that year. The current holders from 2026 are Shore School.
- 2nd VIII 1968 onwards LC Robson Trophy. Robson was Shore's Headmaster (1923–1958). The current holders from 2026 are Shore School.
- 1st IV 1893 onwards Yaralla Cup presented by Miss (later Dame) Eadith Walker in 1906. From 1906 to 1911, inclusive, the Yaralla Cup was awarded for the Second Four race. In 1912 the Yaralla Cup became the First Four trophy. The current holders from 2026 are Saint Ignatius' College, Riverview.
- 2nd IV 1918 onwards Alan Callaway Trophy first awarded 1979. Callaway was a Sydney Boys High School Rowing coach. The current holders from 2026 are Shore School.
- 3rd IV 1920 onwards Father Gartlan Trophy first awarded 1983. Father Gartlan was the founder of the SIC Rowing Club in 1882. The current holders from 2026 are Saint Ignatius' College, Riverview.
- 4th IV 1927 onwards Penrith City Council Trophy first awarded 1986. Awarded by Penrith City Council to mark 50 years of AAGPS rowing on the Nepean River. The current holders from 2026 are Saint Ignatius' College, Riverview.

=== Rifle shooting ===
The official rifle shooting competition commenced in 1905 but results of the National Rifle Association competition date back to 1893. The AAGPS formally admitted shooting as one of its sports in 1903.

- The National Rifle Association Shield purchased by the AAGPS in 1905. The NRA competition had been held annually for many years prior to 1905. The current holder from 2025 is Sydney Grammar School
- The Rawson Cup presented in 1905 by Sir Harry Rawson Governor of New South Wales and Patron of the AAGPS. In 1910 it became a perpetual trophy. The current holder from 2025 is Sydney Grammar School
- The Buchanan Shield from 1905 to 1912 was known as the GPS Challenge Shield but in 1913 was renamed to honour CA Buchanan, a long serving Newington master. The current holder from 2025 is The King's School
- GPSAAA Rifle Shooting Second Grade Premiership Shield - 2nd team first awarded in 1917.

=== Tennis ===
The official tennis competition commenced in 1972.

- 1st team NSW LTA Shield First Grade AAGPS which was first awarded in 1972 and is currently held by The Scots College as of 2025.
- 2nd team NSW LTA Shield Second Grade AAGPS which was first awarded in 1972 and is currently held by The Scots College as of 2025.
- The AAGPS and CAS First Teams compete annually for the John Brown Trophy

=== Basketball ===
The official basketball competition commenced in 1975.

- 1st Team HD Hake Shield first awarded 1975 was presented by The King's School in memory of Herbert Denys Hake OBE Headmaster of Kings (1939–1964).
- 2nd Team TE Bawden Shield first awarded 1975 was presented by The King's School Council.
- The AAGPS and CAS First Teams complete annually for the PJ Yeend Cup presented by Basketball NSW.

The 1sts and 2nds premierships are currently held by Shore School and Saint Ignatius' College, Riverview.

=== Swimming ===
The official swimming competition commenced in 2000. Unofficial competition commenced in 1987 among all nine schools but competitions between the schools via a GPS Relay at each School's Swimming Carnival started in 1922. Between 1903 and 1921, All Schools races were held over various distances at each school's Swimming Carnival.

=== Cross country ===
The official cross country competition commenced in 1988.

- Senior Cross Country NA Emery Shield was first awarded in 1988.

=== Football ===
The official association football competition commenced in 1988

- 1st Grade The Wanderers' Cup for AAGPS Soccer presented in 1988 by The King's School to mark the first school-based game of soccer in Australia between The King's School and The Gentlemen Wanderers played in Parramatta on 14 August 1880.
- 2nd Grade GPS 2nd Soccer XI Premiership first awarded in 1988.

The official "plate" competition commenced in 2015 with all metropolitan schools competing for the 1st XI and 2nd XI GPS ‘Plate’ trophy. The competition is played in Term 2 prior to the Premiership Rounds.

The current holders of the 1st and 2nd XI premierships are Sydney Boys' High and Sydney Grammar.

=== Volleyball ===
- 1st Grade ‘’’Michael Kay Shield’’’ first awarded in 2003 named after Sydney Boy High's Volleyball Coordinator
- 2nd Grade ‘’’Trinh Loi Shield’’’ first awarded in 2006, named after Sydney Grammar School's Volleyball Coordinator/AAGPS Volleyball Coordinator
